= Anti-BDS laws =

Measures opposing boycotts of Israel

Anti-BDS laws are legislation that retaliate against those that engage in the Boycott, Divestment and Sanctions, a movement aiming to pressure Israel to end its systemic segregation and discrimination against Palestinians. With regard to the Arab–Israeli conflict, many supporters of the State of Israel have often advocated or implemented anti-BDS laws, which effectively seek to retaliate against people and organizations engaged in boycotts of Israel-affiliated entities. Most organized boycotts of Israel have been led by Palestinians and other Arabs with support from much of the Muslim world. Since the Second Intifada in particular, these efforts have primarily been coordinated at an international level by the Palestinian-led BDS movement, which seeks to mount as much economic pressure on Israel as possible until the Israeli government allows an independent Palestinian state to be established. Anti-BDS laws are designed to make it difficult for anti-Israel people and organizations to participate in boycotts; anti-BDS legal resolutions are symbolic and non-binding parliamentary condemnations, either of boycotts of Israel or of the BDS movement itself. Generally, such condemnations accuse BDS of closeted antisemitism, charging it with pushing a double standard and lobbying for the de-legitimization of Israeli sovereignty, and are often followed by laws targeting boycotts of Israel.

Proponents of anti-BDS laws claim that BDS is a form of antisemitism, and so such laws legislate against hate speech. Opponents claim that Israel's supporters are engaging in lawfare by lobbying for anti-BDS laws that infringe upon the right to free speech, and conflating anti-Zionism and criticism of Israel with antisemitism.

The specific provisions of anti-BDS laws vary widely. Legislation, to any degree, against boycotts of Israel is prevalent in much of the Western world, and especially in the United States, which has been Israel's closest ally on the international stage since the 1960s. Conversely, legislation promoting or enforcing boycotts of Israel is prevalent in much of the Muslim world, with the most prominent example being that of the Arab League boycott of Israel, which was first imposed in 1945 as part of an effort to weaken the Yishuv by targeting the Jewish economy in the British Mandate for Palestine.

== Background ==
Israel's government has faced longstanding criticism of its conduct in the Palestinian territories it has occupied since 1967. In July 2024, the International Court of Justice declared in an advisory opinion that Israel's occupation was illegal and should be brought to an end as quickly as possible. Existing settlements should be evacuated and reparations paid to Palestinians who had lost land and property. The court also found that Israel was in violation of Article 3 of the International Convention on the Prevention of Racial Discrimination, which imposes a duty on states to "condemn racial segregation and apartheid" and to "prevent, prohibit and eradicate all practices of this nature in territories under their jurisdiction".

The court further said member states should not recognize Israel's occupation as legal, nor should they render aid or assistance in maintaining it – a ruling that could "force companies and member states to differentiate between Israel and occupied territory when it comes to trade", according to a senior legal adviser of the European Center for Constitutional and Human Rights quoted by the Washington Post.

== BDS formation ==
After the Oslo Accords had failed to bring peace between Israel and Palestine, believing Western leaders were no longer committed in holding Israel accountable for the allegations against human rights, Palestinian human right activists conceived a new peaceful movement to boycott Israel, for example, through refusal to buy any goods from Israel, in particular those made in the Israeli-occupied territories, or divesting funds from Israeli corporations. The Boycott, Divestment and Sanctions movement, "BDS" for short, was formally announced in 2005, with the primary goal of pressuring Israel to withdraw from the occupied territories.

The Israeli government and its supporters believe that the BDS movement conforms to the definitions of antisemitism, most notably in applying to Israel a double standard and delegitimizing the state of Israel.

== Anti-BDS laws in the United States ==
According to Israeli scholar Neve Gordon, the American Legislative Exchange Council (ALEC) "has taken upon itself to introduce a slew of laws in the United States that shield Israel from Palestinian-led efforts to mobilize against the crime of apartheid." Gordon writes that ALEC's initiation of legal action to shield Israel from activism against Israeli apartheid appears to be "due to its right-wing evangelical commitments" and to have begun in 2014 with a partnership with the Jewish United Fund after 170 Palestinian civil society organizations called for Boycott, Divestment and Sanctions to pressure Israel to end its systemic segregation and discrimination against Palestinians.

As of 2024, 38 states have passed bills and executive orders designed to discourage boycotts of Israel. Many of them have been passed with broad bipartisan support. Most anti-BDS laws have taken one of two forms: contract-focused laws requiring government contractors to promise that they are not boycotting Israel; and investment-focused laws, mandating public investment funds to avoid entities boycotting Israel. Separately, the U.S. Congress has considered anti-boycott legislation in reaction to the BDS movement. The U.S. Senate passed S.1, which contained anti-boycott provisions, on 28 January 2019, by a vote of 74–19. The U.S. House passed a resolution condemning the boycott of Israel on 24 July 2019, by a vote of 398–17. Senators Marco Rubio (R-FL), Bill Cassidy (R-LA), Mike Braun (R-IN), Rick Scott (R-FL), Bill Hagerty (R-TN), and Steve Daines (R-MT) reintroduced the Combating BDS Act of 2023. So far, no federal law has been adopted. There has been debate over whether such laws violate the First Amendment rights to freedom of speech and freedom of assembly, or the 14th Amendment's Equal Protection Clause, and organizations such as the American Civil Liberties Union (ACLU) and the Council on American–Islamic Relations (CAIR) have challenged many of these laws in court.

=== Public opinions on the BDS movement and anti-BDS laws ===
According to University of Maryland's Critical Issues Poll from October 2019, a majority of Americans oppose anti-BDS laws; 72% opposed laws penalizing people who boycott Israel and 22% supported such laws. The poll also found a strong partisan divide on BDS; among those who had heard of BDS, 76% of Republicans opposed the movement, compared to 52% of Democrats. In a 2019 poll from Data for Progress 35% to 27% opposed anti-BDS laws. Split by party affiliation, 48% of Democrats opposed anti-BDS laws and 15% supported them; 27% of Republicans opposed anti-BDS laws and 44% supported them. 70%-80% believed boycotts were a legitimate protest tactic. According to a 2022 survey by the Pew Research Center, 5% of Americans support BDS and 84% do not know much about it. 17% of Republicans have some familiarity with BDS compared to 15% of Democrats, while 7% of the latter and 2% of Republicans support the movement.

=== Groups that promote anti-BDS laws ===
- Agudath Israel of America
- American Israel Public Affairs Committee
- American Jewish Committee
- American Legislative Exchange Council
- Christians United for Israel
- Israel Action Network
- Israel Allies Foundation
- Israel Project
- Israeli-American Coalition for Action
- Jewish Federations of North America
- Proclaiming Justice to the Nations
- StandWithUs
- Union of Orthodox Jewish Congregations of America
- Zionist Organization of America

=== Groups that oppose anti-BDS laws ===
- American Civil Liberties Union
- American Society of News Editors
- Asian American Advocacy Fund
- Association of Alternative Newsmedia
- Center for Constitutional Rights
- Code Pink
- Council on American–Islamic Relations
- IfNotNow
- Institute for Free Speech
- Foundation for Individual Rights in Education
- Jewish Voice for Peace
- J Street
- National Coalition Against Censorship
- National Newspaper Association
- National Press Club
- National Press Photographers Association
- Partnership for Civil Justice Fund
- Radio Television Digital News Association
- Reporters Committee for Freedom of the Press
- Reporters Without Borders
- Sabeel Ecumenical Liberation Theology Center
- Society of Professional Journalists
- T'ruah

=== Lobbying ===
The spread of anti-BDS laws in U.S. states is largely due to the lobbying of the Israel Allies Foundation (IAF), an Israeli group that encourages formation of pro-Israel caucuses in foreign parliaments. In 2015, in response to South Carolina's anti-BDS law, IAF announced that it had drafted a model act, combining the anti-BDS bills in South Carolina and Illinois. A model act is a "template bill" that can be enacted in many legislatures with little or no modification. IAF also announced that 18 more states were "committed to introducing" similar legislation in their states.

The Copy, Paste, Legislate investigation into the proliferation of model acts in U.S. state politics revealed that, in addition to IAF, AIPAC, the Israel Action Network, and local Jewish Federations were directly involved in lobbying for anti-BDS laws. In three states, Arizona, California, and Nevada, the lobbying efforts were spearheaded by Dillon Hosier, a lobbyist working for Adam Milstein's Israeli-American Council (IAC).

Israeli officials congratulated some states after enacting anti-BDS bills. Gilad Erdan of Israel'sMinistry of Strategic Affairs, wrote an email to Ohio Governor John Kasich after he had signed his state's anti-BDS bill into law: "I sincerely appreciate your contribution." In 2016 Danny Danon, Israel's ambassador to the UN, claimed that his government was "advancing legislation in many countries ... so that it will simply be illegal to boycott Israel." In February 2020, Israel's Prime Minister Benjamin Netanyahu tweeted about his government's lobbying successes:

Whoever boycotts us will be boycotted... In recent years, we have promoted laws in most US states, which determine that strong action is to be taken against whoever tries to boycott Israel.

=== Legal analysis ===
As of 2020, the question of whether American anti-BDS laws are constitutional has not yet been settled in courts. Many analysts believe that sooner or later there will be a legal showdown due to the controversial nature of the laws. The debate about the laws' constitutionality focuses on two central issues:

- Whether boycotts of Israel, and boycotts in general, can be considered a form of discrimination on the same level as discrimination based on gender, race, or similar attributes.
- Whether political boycotts are protected speech. If so, laws designed to stop them could violate the First Amendment-protected rights to freedom of speech and freedom of assembly

The answer to the first question has implications for the answer to the latter; if the boycotts of Israel are discriminatory, the government could be free to enact laws against them.

In the following sections, those who claim that anti-BDS laws are constitutional are referred to as "proponents" and those that claim that they are not are referred to as "critics".

==== Discrimination argument ====
Proponents argue that boycotts of Israel are a form of discrimination because they target a particular group (Israelis) with the intent of inflicting economic harm on them. Since there is no legal test for deciding whether a consumer boycott is discriminatory, the discrimination argument is based on laws regulating discrimination in other areas, such as employment, disability and housing. In particular, two doctrines in labor law have been referred to: disparate treatment or "discriminatory intent" and disparate impact. These laws were not drafted to regulate political boycotts, which limits their applicability, but they have nevertheless been used to analyze whether boycotts of Israel are discriminatory.

===== Disparate treatment =====
Disparate treatment refers to decision-making based on a person's membership in a protected class. Proponents argue that BDS leaders' calls for Israel to cease to exist as a "Jewish state" are antisemitic. Critics contend that the allegation is conflating anti-Zionism with antisemitism; opposing Israel as a "Jewish state" is anti-Zionist but not antisemitic, they argue. Critics also point out that the organization that coordinates BDS, the Palestinian BDS National Committee (BNC), officially opposes antisemitism and encourages supporters to select boycott targets based on their complicity in Israel's human rights violations and likelihood of success, rather than on their national origin or religious identity.

Proponents note that BDS singles out Israel for boycott while ignoring human rights abuses in other parts of the world. They argue that this focus is driven by animosity towards Jews or Israelis and that this is circumstantial evidence of discriminatory intent. They refer to the Working Definition of Antisemitism which gives "Applying double standards by requiring of it [Israel] a behavior not expected or demanded of any other democratic nation" as an example of antisemitism. The claim, which relies on the but-for test, a legal doctrine for establishing causality in discrimination cases, is that BDS would not have boycotted Israel if not for its Jewish or Israeli identity. Critics counter that the but-for claim is not supported by evidence. They argue that because the majority of companies targeted for boycotts by the BNC are not Israeli companies, but foreign companies targeted for their complicity in the Israeli human rights violations, anti-Jewish or anti-Israeli animosity could not therefore be BDS' motivation.

Critics reason that if political boycotts of countries or the singling out an entity for boycott amounted to illegal discrimination, many current and historical boycotts would also be illegal discrimination. The US sanctions against Iran would be anti-Iranian discrimination. The Anti-Apartheid Movement would have had to address the suffering of people in other African countries too, to escape the charge of singling out South Africa. Critics claim that is unreasonable. Following the Russian invasion of Ukraine in 2022, critics of the Israeli government pointed out that several American politicians who supported sanctions against Russia and the boycott of Russia and Belarus had previously campaigned for and passed anti-BDS laws punishing boycotts of Israel.

===== Disparate impact =====
The disparate impact argument complements the disparate treatment argument by stating that the boycott harms Jewish or Israeli entities, even if that is not its intent. That is, the boycott is "fair in form, but discriminatory in operation". Critics argue that the disparate impact doctrine was developed with employment discrimination in mind and is not applicable to BDS — and even if it was, the argument would fail. The plaintiff would have to show that the behavior has an adverse impact on Israeli or Jewish businesses. But the majority of companies targeted by BDS are not Israeli, making it difficult to argue that the boycott harms such entities.

Even if Jewish or Israeli business were disproportionately impacted by BDS' boycott, critics argue that BDS could defend its boycott as a "business necessity" because its goal, ending Israel's human rights violations, is legitimate. An objection could be that BDS should use other methods that does not affect third parties. But given the failure of the many political initiatives in ending Israel's human rights violations, BDS could argue that a boycott of Israel is one of their few remaining options.

==== First Amendment argument ====
Critics claim that anti-BDS laws are unconstitutional because participation in political boycotts is protected speech and the government cannot require citizens to relinquish First Amendment rights in exchange for government contracts. To show this, critics refer to NAACP v. Claiborne Hardware Co., a 1982 United States Supreme Court decision involving an NAACP-initiated a boycott against white merchants in Claiborne. The goal of the boycott was to pressure city officials to meet demands about racial integration. The Supreme Court found that boycotts to bring about political change occupy "the highest rung of the hierarchy of First Amendment values".

Proponents contend that boycotting is not per se expressive conduct equivalent to speech and therefore not protected speech. They view calling for a boycott as distinct from participating in one. The former would be protected speech, while the latter, which anti-BDS laws address, would not. Someone calling for a boycott of Israel would not be affected by anti-BDS laws as long as they themselves did not boycott Israel. To them, Claiborne Hardware is irrelevant because it affirmed the right to call for a boycott but not to participate in one. This view was taken by the Arkansas district court that ruled on Arkansas Times LP v. Mark Waldrip in 2019. It argued that Rumsfeld v. Forum for Academic & Institutional Rights, Inc. (FAIR) (2006) was the controlling case, in which the Supreme Court ruled that the federal government could withhold funds from universities for refusing to give military recruiters access to school resources. Universities denying access to military recruiters is analogous to boycotting Israel, proponents argue. Since the Supreme Court ruled that denying access to military recruiters was not expressive conduct neither could boycotts of Israel be expressive conduct. Critics argue that the analogy does not hold because FAIR was not about boycotting and participation in a political boycott is obvious expressive conduct.

Discarding Claiborne Hardware, proponents also draw analogies between anti-BDS laws and anti-discrimination laws which forbid government contractors from discriminating based on gender and similar attributes. Critics argue that the analogy is inappropriate because, for example, an employer refusing to hire gay people is neither a political act nor expressive conduct. Even if a boycott has a discriminatory component, which the boycott ruled on in Claiborne Hardware had, it is still protected speech, critics assert.

Another objection by propents to Claiborne Hardware is that the case was about the lawfulness of boycotts, but anti-BDS laws merely withdraw a privilege from boycotters: that of being eligible for government contracts. This argument runs afoul of the "unconstitutional conditions" doctrine, critics argue. The doctrine holds that the government "may not deny a benefit to a person on a basis that infringes his constitutionally protected interests—especially, his interest in freedom of speech". This doctrine was promulgated in two seminal Supreme Court cases; Pickering v. Board of Education (1968) and Elrod v. Burns (1976). However, these cases involved existing business relations between private entities and the government. Whether the doctrine of "unconstitutional conditions" applies to situations where no existing business relationship exists has not been addressed by the Supreme Court.

Critics also cite USAID v. Alliance for Open Society (2013) where the Supreme Court ruled that the government cannot require organizations to profess a specific viewpoint as a condition for government funding. But anti-BDS laws coerce contractors bidding to profess to a specific viewpoint, namely of not boycotting or criticizing Israel, which would be an unlawful "constitutional condition".

==== Lack of clarity ====
Critics also state that many anti-BDS laws are not specific enough in what activities they target. Timothy Cuffman cites the Arizona anti-BDS statute which defines a "boycott" as "engaging in a refusal to deal, terminating business activities or performing other actions that are intended to limit commercial relations". In his view, this definition is overly broad and extends far beyond the dictionary definition of the word "boycott". He further argues that many of the laws do not clarify whether divestment is to be considered a form of prohibited boycott or not, nor how a company could be penalized for partaking in "sanctions" as they are imposed by governments or intergovernmental entities.

==== Other arguments ====
Proponents argue that the Tax Reform Act of 1976 and the Export Administration Act of 1979 which penalizes individuals and companies participating in "international boycotts" establishes a precedent. Critics offer two responses: first, Claiborne Hardware was not settled in 1979 so it was not yet clear that political boycotts were protected speech; second, these acts referred to boycotts organized by foreign nations, but BDS is a grassroots initiative organized by civil society groups.

Another argument from proponents is based on Longshoremen v. Allied International, Inc. (1982), where the Supreme Court held that a trade union that refused to unload cargo from the Soviet Union in protest against the country's invasion of Afghanistan had engaged in an illegal secondary boycott. Proponents claim that this case sets a precedent since it singled out a specific country and affected parties not directly involved in the dispute, just like boycotts of Israel do. Critics view Longshoremen as irrelevant because the case was about labor law and such boycotts have consistently been analyzed differently from boycotts by civil rights groups.

=== Federal anti-BDS bills and laws ===
The Protect Academic Freedom Act (H.R. 1409) was introduced to the 113th session of Congress by Republican Representative Peter Roskam on 6 February 2014. The bill would amend the Higher Education Act of 1965 making institutions of higher education ineligible from federal funding if they participated in a boycott of Israeli academic institutions or scholars. The bill died after being deferred to the United States House Committee on Education and Labor.

Roskam and co-sponsor Juan Vargas introduced another anti-BDS bill, United States-Israel Trade and Commercial Enhancement Act (H.R. 825), in February 2015. According to them, the bill would "leverage ongoing trade negotiations to discourage prospective U.S. trade partners from engaging in economic discrimination against Israel" through the monitoring of pro-BDS activities of foreign companies that trade on American stock exchanges and by prohibiting American courts from "enforcing rulings made by foreign courts against American companies solely for conducting business in Israel". However, the bill did not impose penalties for supporting BDS. Roskam justified the bill, which could affect negotiations for the Transatlantic Free Trade Area, by claiming that there were a large number of countries that have embraced BDS.

In March 2015, the Boycott Our Enemies, not Israel Act (H.R. 1572) was introduced to the 114th session of Congress by Republican Representative Doug Lamborn to the House with 13 cosponsors. The bill required current and prospective government contractors to certify that they did not participate in a boycott of Israel. If they did, they would face penalties. The bill died in the Foreign Affairs Committee.

The Israel Anti-Boycott Act (H.R. 1697; S. 720) was introduced to the House and Senate by two identical bills on in March 2017 by Roskam and Democratic Senator Ben Cardin respectively. After causing a great deal of debate over its implications on free speech, the act eventually died in Congress.

The Anti-Boycott Act of 2018, passed as part of the John S. McCain National Defense Authorization Act for Fiscal Year 2019, does not target boycotts against Israel specifically, but makes it illegal to "comply with, further, or support any boycott fostered or imposed by any foreign country, against a country which is friendly to the United States" 50 U.S.C. § 4842 and as the Office of Antiboycott Compliance notes "The Arab League boycott of Israel is the principal unsanctioned foreign boycott that U.S. persons must be concerned with today."

In 2019, one of the co-sponsors to the Israel Anti-Boycott Act, Marco Rubio, introduced the Combating BDS Act (S. 1) to the 116th session of Congress in a package of three other bills related to the Middle East where it passed the Senate without much debate. The act has so far not been taken up in the House.

The House of Representatives passed a bill in July 2019 condemning the BDS movement, with a bipartisan vote of 398–17, with five abstentions.

In May 2023, Josh Gottheimer (D-NJ) and Mike Lawler (R-NY) introduced legislation, the IGO Anti-Boycott Act, expanding anti-boycott laws to include blocking boycotts organized by international governmental organizations, with the intended effect of stopping the Boycott, Divestment, and Sanctions movement in the United States. It would prohibit American citizens and companies from supporting boycotts imposed by global entities (IGOs) against U.S. allies including Israel. The bill faced heavy criticism from House Republicans and conservatives who said it would violate Americans' First Amendment rights. House Republican leadership scrapped a vote on the bill in May 2025.

=== Constitutional challenges ===
As of 2020, a handful of plaintiffs have sued states with anti-BDS laws charging that they violate their First Amendment rights, with decisions being split.

==== Mikkel Jordahl v. Mark Brnovich ====
In 2017, Mikkel Jordahl, who ran his own law firm and contracted with the State of Arizona, refused to certify that he was not participating in boycotts of Israel. Consequently, the state refused to pay him. Jordahl sued the state claiming that his First Amendment rights had been violated.

On 27 September 2018, the Arizona district court ruled in his favor, granting him a preliminary injunction, preventing the state from enforcing the bill's certification requirement. The court ruled that Arizona's anti-BDS laws were applied to politically motivated actions and therefore did not regulate only commercial speech.

The state appealed. While the decision was pending, the certification requirement was amended by bill SB 1167 so that Jordahl and his law firm would be exempted. The appeals court therefore found that the claim was now moot.

==== Koontz v. Watson ====
In May 2017, public school educator Esther Koontz began a personal boycott against Israeli businesses. On 10 July 2017, Koontz was to begin to serve as a teacher trainer implemented by the Kansas State Department of Education (KSDE). The program director asked Koontz to sign a certificate that she was not involved in a boycott of Israel, which she refused to do. KSDE therefore declined to pay or contract with Koontz. Koontz brought a lawsuit against the state, represented by Kansas Commissioner of Education, Randall Watson and requested a preliminary injunction.

The court granted Koontz request for a preliminary injunction, arguing that the law the state relied on was likely unconstitutional and that Kansas therefore must not enforce the law. The court declared that Koontz' conduct was "inherently expressive" because it was easily associated "with the message that the boycotters believe Israel should improve its treatment of Palestinians". The court further concluded that forcing Koontz "to disown her boycott is akin to forcing plaintiff to accommodate Kansas's message of support for Israel".

In 2018 the Kansas state legislature amended the law so that it would not affect Koontz and ACLU that had represented Koontz dropped the case.

==== Arkansas Times LP v. Waldrip ====
The weekly newspaper Arkansas Times had for two years published over 83 paid advertisements on a contractual basis for University of Arkansas – Pulaski Technical College. In October 2018, before renewing the advertising contract, the university asked the paper to certify that it was not, and would not, engage in boycotts against Israel. The paper had supplied such certifications before, but this time the paper's publisher and chief executive officer Alan Leveritt, refused. The paper brought the matter to trial and challenged the constitutionality of Act 710, claiming that it violated the paper's First and Fourteenth Amendment rights and requested a preliminary injunction.

The District Court for the Eastern District of Arkansas dismissed the motion for a preliminary injunction on 23 January 2019. It argued that Act 710 only "concerns a contractor's purchasing activities with respect to Israel" and that it does not prevent criticism of Israel or even calls to boycott Israel. It further asserted that purchasing activities are "neither speech nor inherently expressive conduct". The Court therefore concluded that the First Amendment did not protect the paper's refusal to promise to not boycott Israel.

In February 2019, the paper represented by ACLU appealed the decision to United States Court of Appeals for the Eighth Circuit. In April 2019, the Institute for Free Speech and the Foundation for Individual Rights in Education filed an amicus brief arguing that Act 710 is unconstitutional. Reporters Committee for Freedom of the Press and 15 news media organizations filed another one in support of the paper, while StandWithUs, Agudath Israel of America, and the Union of Orthodox Jewish Congregations of America filed one in support of the State.

In February 2021, the United States Court of Appeals for the Eighth Circuit reversed the decision of the lower court and determined that the Arkansas law violated the First Amendment.

On 22 June 2022, the United States Court of Appeals for the Eighth Circuit issued its decision holding that the law was constitutional and did not violate the First Amendment as it was intended to serve "purely commercial purposes".

==== Abby Martin v. the State of Georgia ====
Documentary filmmaker Abby Martin was invited to speak at an event at Georgia Southern University on 28 February 2020. She was supposed to be paid $1,000 for her speech. She was asked to sign a pledge to agree not to boycott Israel which she refused to do and her speaking arrangement was subsequently cancelled. She therefore announced on 10 January 2020, that she had filed a free speech lawsuit against the State of Georgia and Georgia Southern University over its anti-BDS law. She was represented by CAIR Legal Defense Fund and the Partnership for Civil Justice Fund. On 24 May 2021, the United States District Court for the Northern District of Georgia ruled in Martin's favor, holding that Georgia Southern violated her First Amendment rights.

==== Amawi v. Pflugerville Independent School District ====
Amawi v. Pflugerville Independent School District was a case in Texas where the plaintiffs had all faced potential or real loss of employment with the State of Texas for being unwilling to sign contracts promising not to participate in boycott activities against Israel. The plaintiffs were:

- Bahia Amawi, an American speech pathologist of Palestinian origin. She had contracted with the Pflugerville Independent School District (PISD) for nine years but refused to sign an addendum to her contract requiring her to refrain from boycotting Israel for the duration of her employment. She subsequently lost her contract. PISD initially told Amawi that she could strike out the "No Boycott of Israel" paragraph but later said that agreeing to it was mandatory.
- John Pluecker, a freelance writer, artist, interpreter, and translator, active in the BDS movement. He had contracted with the University of Houston for several years. He also lost his contract after refusing to agree to the "No Boycott of Israel" clause of his contract.
- Zachary Abdelhadi, a Palestinian-American student at Texas State University in San Marcos. He was offered the opportunity to judge debate tournaments for Lewisville Independent School District but refused to sign the District's contract which included the same anti-boycott Israel clause.
- Obinna Dennar, another Texan student. He similarly was required to agree not to boycott Israel to judge a debate tournament in Klein High School, which he refused.
- George Hale, a radio reporter. He claimed that the radio station he worked for KETR coerced him into agreeing to the "No Boycott of Israel" clause of his employment contract.

The Texan District Court had to consider whether Texas may prohibit boycotting the State of Israel as a condition for employment. The Court in its decision on 25 April 2019, dismissed three cases often cited by proponents of anti-BDS laws: Rumsfeld v. FAIR, International Longshoremen's Association v. Allied International, Inc., and Briggs & Stratton Corp. v. Baldridge, and instead it relied on the case NAACP v. Claiborne Hardware Co. The Court held that "content based laws ... are presumptively unconstitutional" and that "[v]iewpoint-based regulations impermissibly 'license one side of a debate' and 'create the possibility that the [government] is seeking to handicap the expression of particular ideas'". It further asserted that the law the State had relied on, HB 89, was unconstitutional under the First Amendment. Robert L. Pitman wrote in his opinion that the law was a restriction on free speech:

It is a content- and viewpoint-based restriction on speech. It is a content-based restriction because it singles out speech about Israel, not any other country. And it is a viewpoint-based restriction because it targets only speech "intended to penalize, inflict harm on, or limit commercial relations specifically with Israel, or with a person or entity doing business in Israel or in an Israeli-controlled territory." Tex. Gov. Case 1:18-cv-01091- ... [T]he Court finds that H.B. 89's plain text, the statements surrounding its passage, and Texas's briefing in this case reveal the statute to be a viewpoint-based restriction intended not to combat discrimination on the basis of national origin, but to silence speech with which Texas disagrees. First, the plain text: H.B. 89 singles out content and viewpoint for restriction. With respect to content, the statute targets only boycotts of Israel; Texas contractors remain free to boycott Palestine or any other country.

Terri Burke, executive director of the ACLU of Texas, said in response to the ruling: "By any name, that's free speech and free speech is the north star of our democracy. It's foundational, and this decision underlines that no issue of importance can be addressed if the speech about it is stymied, or worse, silenced."

==== Ali v. Hogan ====
In January 2019, CAIR, on behalf of former Maryland state legislator and software engineer Saqib Ali, sued Governor Hogan and Attorney General Brian Frosh over the former's executive order banning state contracts with anyone who participates in boycotts against Israel. The lawsuit stated that the order prevented Ali from bidding on government software programming contracts because he supports boycotts of businesses and organisations that "contribute to the oppression of Palestinians". In October 2020, U.S. District Judge Catherine Blake refused to block the executive order, arguing that the plaintiff had not "shown he has suffered any 'direct injury' giving him the legal standing to challenge the order and has not shown his free speech has been 'chilled' or that he engaged in any self-censorship".

=== Related cases ===
These cases are not about anti-BDS laws per se, but about various boycotts targeting Israel.

==== Olympia Food Co-op lawsuit ====
In July 2010, the board of directors of the Olympia Food Co-op (OFC) decided to institute a boycott of Israeli goods. On 11 March 2011, StandWithUs and Akiva Tor, the Israeli Consul General to the Pacific Northwest, met with five members of the co-op and their attorney. Around the same time, four of those five co-op members appeared in a video produced by StandWithUs, describing the negative impact they felt the boycott had had on the co-op. Six months later the five members sued the co-op in a case known as Davis, et al., v. Cox, et al. arguing that the board had acted beyond their scope of their authority and breached their fiduciary duties. The defendants were aided by the Center for Constitutional Rights and the plaintiffs by StandWithUs.

The Court ruled in 2012 that the lawsuit was an illegal Strategic Lawsuit Against Public Participation (SLAPP) and ordered the five co-op members to pay the 16 defendants $10,000 each under Washington's anti-SLAPP statute as well as other legal fees. The five plaintiffs appealed the decision to the Washington State Court of Appeals which on 7 April 2014, upheld the ruling of the lower court. It also upheld the constitutionality of Washington's anti-SLAPP law, which the plaintiffs had challenged.

In 2015, Washington Supreme Court struck down the anti-SLAPP law which meant that the case could be reopened. But at that point, the plaintiffs had abandoned the case and the litigation was ended on 9 March 2018.

==== American Studies Association boycott lawsuit ====
The American Studies Association (ASA) joined the academic boycott of Israel in 2013 and in 2016 it was sued by four ASA members represented by Kenneth L. Marcus of the Brandeis Center and Jerome Marcus of the Israeli think tank Kohelet Policy Forum. The lawsuit alleged that the boycott fell outside the scope of the ASA's corporate charter and stated mission, a type of legal argument known as ultra vires.

The lawsuit was dismissed in 2019 when the judge ruled that plaintiffs lacked standing. A second, related case filed in the state of New York was previously dismissed for "[demonstrating] neither injury nor standing to sue".

=== Anti-BDS laws by state ===
==== Alaska ====
On 19 February 2024, Alaska Governor Mike Dunleavy issued an administrative order stating that all state contracts must include a clause that "the support or participation of a boycott of Israel shall be grounds for termination of the contract".

==== Alabama ====
In 2016, SB 81 was signed into law, prohibiting public entities from contracting with business or non-profit organizations that participate in "discriminatory" boycotts or boycotts with Alabama enjoys open trade. The bill was sponsored by Republican Senator Arthur Orr.

==== Arizona ====
On 17 March 2016, Arizona governor Doug Ducey signed bill HB 2617 into law. The law creates a blacklist of companies which boycott Israel and forbids the State from investing in them. It also requires entities contracting with Arizona to certify that they are not engaged in boycotts of Israel.

In 2019, in response to a court that had blocked the enforcement of HB 2617, the law was amended by SB 1167. The amendment restricted the law so that it would only apply to state contractors with ten or more employees and contracts worth more than $100,000.

IAC for Action lobbied Ducey to sign the bill, according to The Intercept.

==== Arkansas ====
In March 2017, the governor of Arkansas, Asa Hutchinson, signed Act 710 into law which prohibits Arkansas agencies from investing in or contracting with companies unless they sign a pledge not to boycott Israel or offer a 20% cut in compensation in lieu of signing such a pledge. The bill underlying the law, SB 513, was introduced to the state Senate by Bart Hester where it passed with the vote 29–0. It was subsequently sent to the House where it passed 69–3.

==== California ====
California governor Jerry Brown signed bill AB 2844 into law on 24 September 2016, after it passed the Senate 34–1, with Bill Monning as the only dissenter.

The main promoter of the bill, Democratic Assemblyman Richard Bloom, claimed that he worked closely with lobbyist Dillon Hosier to get the bill passed: "Dillon and the IAC worked very closely with me and my legislative team to assure passage and the governor's signature on AB2844 ... [rallying] IAC members to email, call and provide other advocacy on behalf of the Israeli-American community". According to The Intercept, Bloom has received $7,000 in campaign contributions from IAC Chairman Adam Milstein since 2016.

The law requires state contracts to certify that they are complying with California's anti-discrimination laws and that none of their policies against a nation or people is used for discrimination. The bill was rewritten several times after thousands of people protested and after legal experts asserted that the bill was unconstitutional. Therefore, while the intent of the bill was to combat BDS, in actuality it does not, according to Palestine Legal and Center for Constitutional Rights. They argue that BDS campaigns are not discriminatory under the law.

The operative part of the bill states that for any contract worth $100,000 or more, the bidder must be

in compliance with the Unruh Civil Rights Act and the California Fair Employment and Housing Act, and that any policy that they have adopted against any sovereign nation or peoples recognized by the government of the United States, including, but not limited to, the nation and people of Israel, is not used to discriminate in violation of the Unruh Civil Rights Act or the California Fair Employment and Housing Act.

==== Colorado ====
On 19 February 2016, a bipartisan coalition of Coloradoan legislators introduced the bill HB 16–1284. The bill required the state to set up a blacklist of for-profit entities boycotting Israel, so that the Colorado Public Employees Retirement Association (PERA), the fund for the state's public employee pension plan, could divest from them. The fund would also be prohibited from making future investments in blacklisted entities. Governor John Hickenlooper signed bill HB 16-1284 into law 18 March 2016 after it had passed the House and Senate with the votes 54–10 and 25–9 respectively.

The bill was opposed by the ACLU, Friends of Sabeel Colorado, a local chapter of Sabeel Ecumenical Liberation Theology Center, Jewish Voice for Peace, and Coloradoans for Justice in Palestine and by PERA officials who said the bill would create extra administrative work.

==== Florida ====
Florida's state legislature passed the anti-BDS bill SB 86 on 24 February 2016, and it was signed into law on 10 March 2016. The law had the following effects:

- requires Florida to create an online blacklist of companies and for-profit organizations that boycott Israel,
- prohibits public entities in Florida from entering into contracts worth $1 million or more with blacklisted entities or others who boycott Israel, and
- prevents state pension funds from investing in companies engaging in politically motivated boycotts of Israel.

The bill was criticized by the American Civil Liberties Union (ACLU) of Florida who wrote an open letter to Governor Rick Scott, urging him to use his veto. It alleged that the bill was a form of "retribution for the content of speech" and warned that approval of the bill would "undoubtedly lead to litigation challenging its constitutionality that will be both needless and needlessly costly".

In 2018, the State legislature passed the bill HB 545, introduced by Republican Representative Randy Fine and Democrat Representative Jared Moskowitz, to do away with the $1 million threshold in the 2016 law.

In 2019, Republican Representative Randy Fine introduced the bill HB 741, amending the state's anti-discrimination law to adopt a contested redefinition of antsemitism including the so-called "3D test" of antisemitism. The bill passed the legislature unanimously and was signed into law by the governor in May. A group of 30 Jewish Floridans wrote to the governor, urging him to veto the bill because they thought it conflated criticism of Israel with antisemitism. Fine dismissed their concerns as being unrepresentative of Florida's Jewish community.

The village of Bal Harbour in Florida has passed two anti-BDS ordinances; one in 2015 titled "Non-discrimination" which prevents the village from entering into a contract with a business engaging in boycotts, and one in 2017, adopting a definition of antisemitism which labels most criticism of Israel as antisemitic according to Palestine Legal.

==== Georgia ====
The bill SB 327 passed the House and Senate with the votes 95–71 and 41–8 and was signed into law in April 2016. The law requires companies and individuals to certify that they are not boycotting Israel or Israeli settlements to be eligible for contract work with the state. The law waives the certification requirement for contracts worth less than $1,000. The law was supported by the Israeli Consulate, the Israel Project, the Israel Allies Foundation, and American Jewish Committee among others and opposed by the Center for Constitutional Rights.

Deborah Silcox and Michael Wilensky introduced an amendment to the law, HB 1058, in February 2020 to raise the certification exemption from $1,000 to $100,000 in response to documentary filmmaker Abby Martin suing the University of Georgia for cancelling her speaking arrangement after she refused to pledge not to boycott Israel. According to Silcox, the Israeli consulate in Atlanta had requested an amendment to that effect. In May 2021, Martin announced she was successful in getting the above law struck down in Georgia as unconstitutional.

==== Illinois ====
On 23 July 2015, Illinois became the first state in the US to explicitly punish boycotts of Israel as the bill SB 1761 was signed into law by Governor Bruce Rauner. The law sets up a blacklist of non-American companies that boycott Israel and requires the state's pension funds to divest from them. Chicago's Jewish federation the Jewish United Fund, the New York-based American Jewish Committee and other organizations had lobbied for the bill.

In January 2020, House Representative Jonathan Carroll introduced the bill HB 4049 which adopts a contested definition of antisemitism equating criticism of Israel with anti-Jewish discrimination. The language of the bill draws heavily on the International Holocaust Remembrance Alliance's Working Definition of Antisemitism in which "Delegitimizing the State of Israel by denying the Jewish people their right to self-determination and denying the State of Israel the right to exist" is labelled a form of antisemitism. The bill would make public schools and universities culpable for failing to treat discrimination as defined by the bill in the same manner that they treat discrimination motivated by race.

==== Indiana ====
In January 2016, the Indiana General Assembly passed the bill HB 1378 authored by Republican Representative Brian Bosma and co-authored by Republican Representatives Bill Fine, Martin Carbaugh, Mike Speedy, Timothy Wesco, Woody Burton, Christopher Judy, Edward Clere, Jerry Torr, and Democrat representative Ed DeLaney. It passed unanimously in the Indiana House of Representatives and with the vote 47–3 in the Indiana State Senate. The bill mandated the setup of a blacklist of commercial enterprises and non-profit organizations boycotting Israel. The blacklist would be used by funds managed by the State, such as the teachers' retirement fund and the public employees retirement fund, to divest from such entities.

Elliot Bartky, of the Jewish Affairs Committee of Indiana, welcomed the bill. Erin Polley of the American Friends Service Committee's Indiana Peacebuilding Program criticized the bill and said that it "punishes the businesses that refuse to do business in land that has been illegally occupied".

==== Iowa ====
In April 2016, the Iowa General Assembly passed a law that prohibits state investment and procurement with companies that boycott Israel. In the state senate the bill HF 2331 passed with the vote 38–9 and in the Iowa House of Representatives with 70–24. The bill was subsequently signed into law by governor Terry Branstad. The bill mandated the setup of a list of "scrutinized companies" from which state managed public funds must divest from.

ACLU of Iowa criticized the bill.

In February 2020, the bill HF 2504 was introduced, requiring government entities to use the Working Definition of antisemitism in determining whether alleged discrimination was motivated by "discriminatory antisemitic intent". The bill passed the House in March. Lara Friedman called the bill a weapon "in the battle to quash activism and criticism targeting Israel".

==== Kansas ====
On 16 June 2017, HB 2409 was signed into laws by Kansas governor Sam Brownback. The law requires individuals and companies to certify that they are not boycotting Israel to be eligible for contracts with or procurement from the State. In 2018, the law was amended by HB 2482 to preclude the outcome of an ongoing lawsuit (Koontz v. Watson) brought against the State by the ACLU. The new law would only apply to companies with contracts worth more than $100,000 and would not affect sole proprietors.

In 2019, Democrat House representative John Carmichael introduced HB 2015 that would repeal the anti-BDS law, but it died in committee.

==== Kentucky ====
In November 2018, Kentucky's governor Matt Bevin signed an executive order 2018-905 requiring contractors to certify that they did not boycott Israel. Bevin stated that Netanyahu had lobbied for such a policy during the summer.

The executive order was followed the next year by the bill SB 143, signed into law on 25 March 2019, limiting the law to contractors with five or more employees and contracts valued $100,000 or more.

==== Louisiana ====
On 22 May 2018, governor John Bel Edwards signed an executive order requiring state vendors to certify that they are not boycotting Israel and will not for the duration of the contract boycott Israel. In 2019, the bill HB 245 was enacted, codifying the executive order. The bill limited the certification requirement to vendors with more than five employees and contracts worth more than $100,000.

The Copy, Paste, Legislate investigation found that Edwards did not write the executive order nor the press release accompanying it. Instead, they were sent to him by Mithun Kamath of the Jewish Federation of Greater New Orleans. Kamath claimed the executive order was reviewed by AIPAC and the Israel Action Network, a group founded to "counter delegitimization" of Israel.

==== Maryland ====
Governor Larry Hogan signed executive order 1 January 2017.25 into law on 23 October 2017. The order prohibited execute agencies from entering into procurement contracts with companies that boycotted Israel. The order came after activists for several years had successfully defeated similar legislative initiatives.

==== Michigan ====
The anti-BDS law in Michigan is from January 2017 when governor Rick Snyder signed the bills HB 5821 and HB 5822 into law. They prohibit the state from entering into construction and repair contracts and from procurement of supplies, services, or information technology with entities boycotting Israel.

==== Minnesota ====
Governor Mark Dayton signed the bill HF 400/SF 247 into law on 3 May 2017. The bill prohibits state agencies from contracting with vendors unless they certify that they are not "discriminating" against Israel. Discriminating is defined as "refusals to deal, terminating business activities, or other actions that are intended to limit commercial relations with Israel, or persons doing business with Israel, when such actions are taken in a manner that in any way discriminates on the basis of nationality or national origin and is not based on a valid business reason".

==== Mississippi ====
HB 761, Israel Support Act of 2019 was introduced in February 2019 into the State legislature and signed into law in March the same year. The law creates a blacklist of companies that boycott Israel and Israeli settlements and prevents state funds from being invested in company on the list. Republican Representative Donnie Bell were the primary author of the bill.

==== Missouri ====
In 2018, two bills, HB 2179 and SB 849, were introduced in Missouri's legislature. If passed they would have required companies and non-profit organizations bidding for contracts worth $10,000 or more to sign in writing they are not, and will not, boycott Israel. The bills came under fire from civil rights activists and failed to pass. Republican state Senator Rob Schaaf filibustered the bill by introducing amendments that would add every country in the world to it. He meticulously went through every country in alphabetical order. Senator Mike Kehoe withdrew the bill when Schaaf reached Bahamas. HB 2179 passed the house but nearly 80% of the Democrats voted against it.

However, a similar bill, SB 739, requiring contractors with ten or more employees and contractors bidding for contracts worth $100,000 to sign the anti-boycott pledge, passed Missouri's legislature in 2020. It was signed into law by governor Mike Parson on 13 July 2020.

==== Nevada ====
Republican Lieutenant Governor Mark Hutchison introduced SB 26 in 2017. It passed the Assembly 39–0 with three abstentions; Skip Daly, John Ellison, and Edgar Flores, and the Senate 19–2, the nay voters being Yvanna Cancela and Tick Segerblom. Governor Brian Sandoval signed the bill into law on 2 June. The law requires the state to create a blacklist of for-profit entities boycotting Israel that the state is forbidden from contracting with or investing in.

The Copy, Paste, Legislate investigation revealed that Hutchinson worked together with Hosier to draft the bill, modeled on Arizona's law. Hutchinson had in 2013 been on an all-expenses-paid trip to Israel paid for by the American Israel Education Foundation, the educational arm of the pro-Israel lobby the American Israel Public Affairs Committee.

==== New Hampshire ====
In 2023, Governor of New Hampshire Chris Sununu issued an executive order forbidding the state from working with entities involved in anti-Israel boycotts.

==== New Jersey ====
In 2016, the bill A 925/S 1923 was passed by the state legislature and signed into law by governor Chris Christie on 16 August 2016. The bill orders the state's pension funds to divest from companies that boycott Israel or Israeli businesses. A related bill, A 2940, which would have prohibited funding for colleges and universities to be used directly or indirectly to support BDS, failed to pass.

The bill was criticized by ACLU of New Jersey and of the editorial board of Star Ledger who in an editorial titled "N.J. pro-Israel bills take Big Brother to the extreme" wrote: "If it sounds more like the McCarthy hearings of the 1950s than a message against 'veiled discrimination', that's because it is."

==== New York ====
Since 2013 there have been multiple bills discussed or proposed in the New York State Senate and New York State Assembly to sanction individuals, businesses or organizations that support BDS. None have been passed. In 2016 Andrew Cuomo created a blacklist by executive order.

In December 2013, the American Studies Association (ASA) decided to join the academic boycott of Israel, which caused an outcry in the American political establishment. Jeffrey Klein, a New York State Senate Co-leader, and Assemblyman Dov Hikind announced plans to introduce a law that would withdraw state funding from colleges maintaining memberships in groups boycotting Israel. In a joint statement, the lawmakers described the ASA boycott as "targeted discrimination against Israel that betrays the values of academic freedom that we hold dear".

On 27 January 2014, the New York State Senate, by a vote of 56–4, approved the bill S 6438 that would ban universities and colleges from funding organizations that "have undertaken an official action boycotting certain countries or their higher education institutions". Klein stated that "we should never ask taxpayers to support religious, ethnic or racial discrimination" and further vowed to "not allow the enemies of Israel or the Jewish people to gain an inch in New York". ASA's president-elect, Lisa Duggan, countered by describing the bill as a thinly veiled attempt to hide Israel's "violations of international law and human rights" and asserted that the bill "let[s] Israel off the hook for restricting the academic and other freedoms of Palestinians, while punishing those who protest those injustices". The New York Times described it as "a chill on free speech" and Michelle Goldberg as "New York's Outrageous Attempt to Ban Academic BDS". In the end, the bill failed to pass as the New York Assembly never voted on it.

During the 2015–2016 legislative season, the New York legislature considered but ultimately rejected several anti-BDS bills. Among them was A8220A, a bill sponsored by member of New York State Assembly and Democrat representative Charles D. Lavine. According to Benjamin Weinthal, fellow at the think tank Foundation for Defense of Democracies and Asaf Romirowsky, director of the pro-Israeli Scholars for Peace in the Middle East, the threat of such bills was enough to prompt Erste Group to shut down an Austrian BDS group's bank account.

In May 2016, governor Andrew Cuomo signed executive order 157 into law. The order mandated the creation of a blacklist of institutions and companies by the Commissioner of the Offices of General Services "that the Commissioner determines, using credible information available to the public, participate[s] in boycott, divestment, or sanctions activity targeting Israel, either directly or through a parent or subsidiary". The blacklist would be published on a government website and public entities would be required to divest from blacklisted institutions. To be taken off the blacklist, institutions would have to provide written evidence to the Commissioner that they are no longer boycotting Israel. In an op-ed in The Washington Post defending the executive order, Cuomo compared BDS with terrorism and murder:

During a visit with a bipartisan delegation that August, I was shown a miles-long Hamas tunnel built to infiltrate Israel's southern communities and murder their residents. The tunnel was frightening because it was the manifestation of the single-minded obsession by Israel's enemies to destroy the Jewish state. And yet, in many ways it was not nearly as frightening as continued efforts to boycott, divest from and sanction Israel.

Ben Norton, writing for Salon, decried the executive order as pro-Israel McCarthyism.

In 2017, Republican Senator Elaine Phillips sponsored two anti-BDS bills: SB 2492 and SB 2493. SB 2492 would prevent the state from contracting with or investing in entities that "engage in activities to boycott American allied nations", a category that includes Israel, while SB 2493 would prevent student organizations that engage in "hate speech", including advocating for BDS, from receiving public funding. Both bills died in committee. Senator Klein introduced the third anti-BDS bill for the legislative season, SB 4837, to prohibit colleges from using state aid to fund an "academic entity" if that entity has undertaken to boycott "certain countries or their higher education institutions". Those countries would include Israel. Klein's bill also died in committee.

===== Bills in counties and towns =====
In May 2016, Nassau County passed a bill denying public work to companies that boycott or divest from Israel. The County caused some controversy in 2017 when it tried to get the Nassau Events Center to cancel a concert with well-known BDS activist Roger Waters by threatening legal action. County legislator Howard Kopel called Waters a "notorious front-man for the BDS" and a "virulent antisemite". The New York Civil Liberties Union urged the county to withdraw its threat and let the concert go forward and to repeal the law. The County yielded and the concert took place as planned.

The Town of Hempstead passed a similar bill in June 2016, prohibiting business that contracts with the Town from participating in boycott activity. The bill was praised by Zionist Organization of America, specifically for including "territories controlled by Israel" – a euphemism for the West Bank – because boycotts of Israeli settlements could lead to full boycotts of Israel. Rockland County followed suit in April 2017, by requiring companies and individuals doing business with the county to promise that they do not boycott Israel.

==== North Carolina ====
North Carolina got its anti-BDS law on 31 July 2017, as governor Roy Cooper signed bill HB 161 into law after it had passed the state House and state Senate with the votes 96–19 and 45–3. The law mandates the setup of a blacklist of companies that boycott Israel with which the state would be forbidden to invest in or contract with.

==== Ohio ====
In December 2016, the Ohio General Assembly passed bill HB 476 with the vote 81–13 and five abstentions in the House and 26–5 in the Senate and was subsequently signed into law by governor John Kasich. The bill prohibits the state from contracting with for-profit entities unless the entity declares that it does not boycott Israel.

==== Oklahoma ====
The anti-BDS bill HB 3967 was enacted in the Oklahoma Legislature in 2020. It passed the state House and Senate with the votes 75–20 and 36–7. The bill requires state contractors to certify that they are not boycotting Israel. Contracts worth less than $100,000 and individuals are exempted from the law.

The primary sponsors of the bill were Republican Representative Mark McBride and Republican Senator Darrell Weaver. McBride referred to the Bible to motivate the bill: "The Bible is clear that those who bless Israel will be blessed and those who curse Israel will be cursed."

==== Pennsylvania ====
On 4 November 2016, governor Tom Wolf signed the bill HR 2107 into law. It prohibits the state from contracting with entities unless they certify that they are not engaged in boycotts based on race, religion, gender, national affiliation or national origin. The penalty for a false certification is $250,000 or twice the value of the contract, whichever is greater. The bill was criticized as a threat to freedom of speech by Palestine Legal, the Center for Constitutional Rights and the National Lawyers Guild.

According to Palestine Legal, while the intent of the law is to target boycotts of Israel, the law does not because BDS-inspired boycotts are not discriminatory.

==== Rhode Island ====
In February 2016, governor Gina Raimondo signed bill H 7736 into law. The bill had previously passed the House with the vote 63–4 and the Senate unanimously. According to the bill's sponsor, Democrat Senator Mia Ackerman, students at Brown University opposed the bill and told her it was a violation of their First Amendment rights but Ackerman thought the bill was about "regulating commercial activity".

The bill prohibits state entities from entering into contracts with companies that engages in boycotts "based on race, color, religion, gender, or nationality of the targeted person, firm, entity or public entity of a foreign state". According to Palestine Legal, the bill does probably not affect BDS-inspired boycotts of Israel because they are protesting Israeli government policies.

==== South Carolina ====
South Carolina's State legislature passed bill H 3583 which was signed into law by governor Nikki Haley on 4 June 2015. It prohibits public entities from doing business with companies engaged in "discriminatory" boycotts:

A public entity may not enter into a contract with a business to acquire or dispose of supplies, services, information technology, or construction unless the contract includes a representation that the business is not currently engaged in, and an agreement that the business will not engage in, the boycott of a person or an entity based in or doing business with a jurisdiction with whom South Carolina can enjoy open trade ...

While the law does not explicitly mention Israel, Palestine or the BDS movement, state legislators stated that they were targeting BDS.

The primary sponsor of the bill Alan Clemmons hailed the bill as "the country's first legislation confronting BDS". In an interview with The Jerusalem Post, Clemmons claimed that he got the idea while on a trip to Israel with other legislators in 2015, paid for by election campaign funds. There he met legal scholar Eugene Kontorovich during a dinner at a winery who he credited with helping him develop the bill and ensuring its constitutionality. The key to avoiding constitutional challenges was according to Kontorvich that "these laws do not ban any kind of BDS activity, but rather restrict public money from supporting boycotting companies".

===== Antisemitism redefinition =====
In 2017, Clemmons introduced another bill into the State legislature, H 3643. The bill overwhelmingly passed in the House with the vote 103–3, but was defeated in the Senate. H 3643 was controversial because it would have required colleges to use the 2010 US State Department's definition of antisemitism when investigating alleged civil rights violations. The definition has been criticized for conflating criticism of Israel with antisemitism and critics have alleged that it was designed to suppress political speech by smearing it as antisemitism. But supporters of the bill, such as Kenneth L. Marcus of the Brandeis Center, claimed that it did not regulate or restrict free speech.

In 2018, text mirroring the bill was inserted as a rider to the 2018–2019 State budget bill by senator Larry Grooms which passed and was signed into law by governor Henry McMaster. Because the legislation was attached to a budgetary bill it would expire in one year unless reauthorized by legislators.

==== South Dakota ====
In January 2020, governor Kristi Noem signed an executive order requiring contractors to the state to sign in writing that they are not boycotting, and will not boycott, Israel. The order applies to contractors with more than five employees and contracts worth over $100,000.

==== Tennessee ====
In 2019, Tennessee lawmakers Dolores Gresham and Mark White introduced the bills HB 600 and SB 1250. The purpose of the bills is to require state education institutions to adopt the State Department's controversial definition of antisemitism which includes the Three Ds of antisemitism.

==== Texas ====
On 2 May 2017, Texas Governor Greg Abbott signed HB 89 into law which came into effect on 1 September 2017. The law prohibits the state from contracting with businesses unwilling to pledge that they will not boycott Israel. It also requires Texas to develop a blacklist of for-profit entities that boycott Israel so that it can divest its pension funds from those entities. The United States District Court for the Western District of Texas, Austin division, in the case Amawi v. Pflugerville Independent School District ruled that the law was unconstitutional.

The law came under fire in October 2017 from both Democrats and Republicans as Dickinson, Texas required Hurricane Harvey victims who applied for disaster relief funds to promise not to boycott Israel. Dickinson's mayor, Julie Masters, said that the requirement was a consequence of the law but Phil King who had authored the law said the city had misunderstood it. The Dickinson City Council eventually removed the anti-Israel boycott clause from the disaster relief application.

==== Wisconsin ====
In 2017, two bills were introduced into Wisconsin's legislature: SB 450 and AB 553. They require entities contracting with the state to certify that they are not boycotting Israel. On 27 October 2017, governor Scott Walker also signed an executive order asserting that state agencies have the right to terminate existing contracts with entities that boycott Israel.

==== Virginia ====
On 9 March 2016, the Virginia House of Delegates passed a resolution condemning the BDS movement, the day after the Virginia Senate passed the same resolution. The resolution calls for a two-state solution and opposes "all attempts to economically and politically isolate Israel within the international arena, including promotion of economic, cultural, and academic boycotts, and all efforts to assault the legitimacy of the State of Israel as the sovereign homeland of the Jewish people".

=== Summary of US legal situation ===
The following table summarizes the legal situation in states with anti-BDS laws. The columns denote the following: the Certification column denotes whether the state requires some or all of its contractors to certify that they are not boycotting Israel, the Blacklist column whether the state maintains a blacklist of entities that boycott Israel that state funds must divest from, and the IHRA column denotes whether the state has adopted IHRA's Working Definition of Antisemitism. The definition could imply that boycotting Israel is a form of antisemitism.

State	Certification	Blacklist	IHRA	Passed bills
Alabama	Yes (Note: The law does not apply to contracts worth less than $15,000 or if the "business entity" offers a 20% discount.)	No	No	SB 81 (2016)
Arizona	Yes (Note: Only for contractors with 10 or more employees and contracts worth more than $100,000.)	Yes	Yes	HB 2617 (2016), SB 1167, (2019), HB 2684, SB 1143 (2020)
Arkansas	Yes	Yes	No	Act 710 (SB 513) (2017)
California	Yes (Note: Only applicable to contracts worth over $100,000 and does not affect BDS-inspired boycotts according to Palestine Legal.)	No	No	AB 2844
Colorado	No	Yes (Note: Blacklisting only applies to investments by Colorado's public employees' retirement association.)	No	HB 16-1284 (2016)
Florida	No	Yes	Yes	SB 86 (2016), HB 545 (2018), HB 371, HB 741 (2019)
Georgia	Yes (Note: Certification is not required for contracts valued less than $1,000.)	No	No	SB 327 (2016)
Illinois	Yes	Yes	No	SB 3017 (2014), SB 1761 (2015)
Indiana	No	Yes	No	HB 1378 (2016)
Iowa	No	Yes	No	HF 2331 (2016)
Kansas	Yes (Note: Only applicable to contracts worth more than $100,000 and excludes sole proprietorships.)	No	No	HB 2409 (2017), HB 2482 (2018)
Kentucky	Yes (Note: Only applies to contracts worth more than $100,000 and contractors with more five or more employees.)	No	No	SB 143 (2019)
Louisiana	Yes (Note: Only applies to contracts worth more than $100,000 and contractors with more than five employees.)	No	No	HB 245 (2019)
Maryland	Yes	No	No	EO 01.01.2017.25 (2017)
Michigan	Yes	No	No	HB 5821 (2016), HB 5822 (2016)
Minnesota	Yes	No	No	HF 400 (2017), SF 247 (2017)
Mississippi	No	Yes	No	HB 761 (2019)
Missouri	Yes (Note: Only applies to companies, including non-profits, with ten or more employees and contracts worth more than $100,000.)	No	No	SB 739, HB 2179 (2020)
Nevada	No	Yes	No	SB 26
New Jersey	No	Yes	No	A 925 (2016)
New York	No	Yes	No	EO 157 (2016)
North Carolina	No	Yes	No	HB 161 (2017)
Ohio	Yes	No	Yes	HB 476 (2017), EO 2022-06D (2022)
Oklahoma	Yes (Note: Does not apply to agreements with individuals and contracts worth less than $100,000.)	No	No	HB 3967 (2020)
Pennsylvania	Yes (Note: Does not apply to BDS-inspired, political boycotts according to Palestine Legal.)	No	No	HB 2107 (2016)
Rhode Island	Yes (Note: Does not apply to BDS-inspired, political boycotts according to Palestine Legal.)	No	No	H 7736 (2016)
South Carolina	Yes	No	No	H 3583 (2015)
South Dakota	Yes (Note: Only applies to contracts worth more than $100,000 and contractors with more than five employees.)	No	No	EO 2020-01 (2020)
Tennessee	Yes	No	Yes	SB 1993 (2022), HB 2673 (2022)
Texas	Yes	Yes	No	HB 89 (2017)
Wisconsin	Yes	No	No	SB 450 (2018), AB 553 (2018)

Local laws and ordinances:

- Sec. 2-402 (2015), Sec. 2-112 (2017), Bal Harbour Village, Florida
- R2015-569 (2015), City of Chicago, Illinois
- 15-4701 (2015), Cook County, Illinois
- Resolution No. 195 (2017), Rockland County, New York

Bills under consideration:

- HB 4049 (2020), Illinois
- HB 1058 (2020), Georgia
- HB 600, SB 1250 (2019), Tennessee

Rejected bills:

- HB 2015 (2019), Kansas
- SB 849 (2018), Missouri
- S 6438 (2014), SB 8017, A8220 (2016), New York
- HB 1512 (2017), Oklahoma
- HB 1968, HB 1969 (2017), Pennsylvania
- H 3643, (2017), South Carolina

== Anti-BDS laws in other countries ==
=== Israel ===
In 2011, the Israeli parliament, the Knesset, passed an anti-BDS law that makes calls for boycotts of Israel or its settlements a civil wrong. The law allows targets of boycotts to claim damages from people and organizations who promote them without having to prove that they have suffered economic harm. It also allows the government to deny contracts and withdraw financial support to boycott promoters. The law does not create any criminal offences or criminal sanctions.

The law was heavily criticized in Israel by both left-wing and Arab political parties. Israeli leftist and human rights organizations also criticized the law, and launched a public campaign against it. Prior to the law's approval, four Israeli human rights groups sent letters to Knesset Speaker Reuven Rivlin, Justice Minister Yaakov Neeman, and Finance Minister Yuval Steinitz, demanding a halt in the approval process of the law. After the law was passed, the far-left Gush Shalom movement petitioned the Supreme Court, claiming that the law violated basic democratic principles. The Supreme Court has given the Israeli government 60 days to respond. Thirty-four law professors signed a petition against the law to be forwarded to Attorney-General Yehuda Weinstein.

During an address to the Knesset, Israeli Prime Minister Benjamin Netanyahu rejected criticism over his failure to attend the boycott law vote, and stressed that he had in fact approved the bill. He also criticized Kadima party members who initially supported the bill and later opposed its final version, accusing them of folding to pressure.

In 2017, Israel enacted Amendment No. 28 to the Entry Into Israel Law, a law that prohibits foreigners who support a boycott of Israel from entering the country or its settlements. In 2018, the Strategic Affairs Ministry published a list of 20 BDS-friendly organizations whose officials would be denied entry. In 2019, Israel caused some controversy by denying entry to two US congresspersons, Rashida Tlaib and Ilhan Omar, known for their support of BDS. As of 2020, Israel has denied entry to 16 people based on the law, including seven French politicians and EU parliamentarians.

=== Canada ===
A proposed anti-BDS law called Standing Up Against Anti-Semitism in Ontario Act (Bill 202), sponsored by Progressive Conservative Tim Hudak, was defeated with the vote 39–18 in the Legislative Assembly of Ontario in 2016. The law would have prevented anyone who supports or participates in the BDS movement from contracting with any public body in Ontario.

In June 2019, Vancouver City Councillor Sarah Kirby-Young introduced a motion to get the city to adopt the IHRA's Working Definition of Antisemitism, including its "illustrative examples" of antisemitism. Following campaigning by free speech activists, the motion was struck down with the vote 6–5 on 23 July 2019. The five dissenting votes came from the local conservative Non-Partisan Association party.

=== France ===
France criminalizes calls to boycott other nations since 1977, on the basis of the Press Law of 1881, which criminalizes public incitement to discrimination, and of a 1977 addition to the penal code, which states that "hindering the normal exercise of any economic activity" constitutes discrimination. The 1977 addition was a response to the Arab League boycott of Israel. This was strengthened in 2003 with the Lellouche law, named after Pierre Lellouche, which strengthened criminal penalties and designated national origin as a protected class. The law was described by left-wing Israeli newspaper Haaretz as "among the world's most potent tools to fight the growing Boycott, Divestment, and Sanctions movement" and as having "catapulted France to the forefront of efforts to counter the movement through legal means". According to Pascal Markowicz, head of the BDS legal task force of France's CRIF Jewish umbrella organization, the law has resulted in France divesting less from Israel than other European countries.

==== Baldassi & Others v. France ====
On 26 September 2009, and 22 May 2010, eleven activists of the Palestine 68 Collective, a group supportive of BDS, participated in demonstrations outside the same supermarket urging customers not to purchase goods imported from Israel. They wore shirts emblazoned with the words "Long live Palestine, boycott Israel" and handed out flyers saying that "buying Israeli products means legitimizing crimes in Gaza".

In 2011 following a memo issued by French Minister of Justice Michèle Alliot-Marie instructing prosecutors to prosecute citizens calling for boycotts of Israeli products, the activists were charged with inciting discrimination under article 24 (8) of the Press Law of 1881. The trial court, the Tribunal correctionel de Mulhouse, acquitted the defendants. But the ruling was appealed by four groups, France-Israel Chamber of Commerce, Avocats sans Frontières, Association France-Israel and the Simon Wiesenthal Center's French associate the Bureau National de Vigilance Contre l'Antisemitisme, to the appeals court, Cour d'appel de Colmar, which convicted the defendants in November 2013 and fined them €1,000 per participant. They were also ordered to pay court expenses of €28,000. The supreme civil court, the Cour de cassation, upheld the conviction in October 2015, citing a law that prescribes imprisonment or a fine for parties that "provoke discrimination, hatred or violence toward a person or group of people on grounds of their origin, their belonging or their not belonging to an ethnic group, a nation, a race or a certain religion".

The decision was appealed to the European Court of Human Rights (ECHR) which had to decide whether it was justified to restrict the defendants right to freedom of expression as defined by article 10(1) of the European Convention on Human Rights. Article 10(2) of the convention allows for such restrictions if they are "in accordance with law" and "necessary in a democratic society". The Court noted that, as interpreted in this case, the French law would appear to prohibit any call for boycotts based on geographic origin, regardless of other circumstances. It further contended that the defendants' actions were a form of political expression and that article 10(2) leaves little room for restricting such political expression. The Court firmly rejected the idea that BDS would be discriminatory or antisemitic in itself.

On 11 June 2020, the Court delivered its unanimous ruling, finding the conviction breached the defendants' rights under Article 10, and ordering the French Government to pay each applicant €7,380.

==== SodaStream ====
In 2010, BDS activists of the France Palestine Solidarity Association (FPSA) targeted the Israeli manufacturer of a home carbonation product SodaStream for having a factory in the West Bank while its products are labelled "Made in Israel". SodaStream's French distributor sued the FPSA for "falsely claiming that the products are 'illegally sold' as a result of being manufactured in 'occupied territories' while bearing the 'Made in Israel' label" and for advising French store managers that "selling SodaStream products constitutes fraud" and that they could be prosecuted for doing so.

In January 2014, a French court ruled that FPSA could not use the words "illegal" or "fraudulent" to describe SodaStream products and ordered the group to pay SodaStream's distributor €4,000 in compensatory damages and €2,500 to cover its legal fees. In the meantime, SodaStream announced that it would move its factory from the Israeli settlement to Lehavim, a city in southern Israel.

=== Germany ===
In August 2017, the Frankfurt City Council approved a bill introduced by Frankfurt's mayor Uwe Becker to deny BDS the use of city funds and venues. Any organization that was found to support BDS would risk losing city funding.

On 17 May 2019, right-wing populist party Alternative for Germany sponsored a bill "Condemn the BDS movement – protect the existence of the State of Israel" (19/9757) to ban the BDS movement nationally. It was defeated 62–431–2 by the Bundestag as the bill lacked support from all other parties. The Bundestag instead passed a non-binding resolution which condemned the BDS movement the same day.

==== Glanz v. Oldenburg ====
On 18 May 2016, BDS Initiative Oldenburg, a local chapter of the BDS movement in Oldenburg, planned to hold a BDS-related event featuring Israeli human rights activist Ronnie Barkan. On 15 April 2016, Christoph Glanz, one of the group's members, applied to rent a room in the City of Oldenburg's cultural center, PFL. He was informed that his request had been granted and he sent out invitations for the event. After the city received numerous emails expressing doubts about the BDS event, the city informed Glanz that his permission to rent the room had been withdrawn. The city believed that the event would cause a confrontation between BDS supporters and opponents so that public safety could not be guaranteed. Glanz contended that his booking had been withdrawn for political reasons and approached the City in the Administrative Court in Oldenburg.

The Court argued that since the city's withdrawal of Glanz' booking occurred after it had already been confirmed, it violated article 5(1), the right to freedom of expression, and article 8(1), the right to freedom of assembly, of the German Basic Law and was unlawful.

==== Ried v. Munich ====
On 13 December 2017, Munich passed a resolution titled Against every form of antisemitism – No cooperation with the antisemitic BDS (boycott, divestment, sanctions) movement becoming the first German city to deny space and public funds for BDS. Charlotte Knobloch, a Holocaust survivor and chairwoman of the Munich Jewish community who campaigned for the legislation, said, "Munich sent a signal against antisemitism".

On 19 April 2018, Klaus Ried applied to the Munich City Museum asking for a venue to hold a debate titled "How far does Munich restrict the right to freedom of expression? – City Council's resolution from December 13, 2017 and its consequences". The target audience for the debate was politically interested people. On 25 April 2018, the museum rejected Ried's application on grounds that it would violate the resolution from December 2017 – the very same resolution the event was supposed to debate. The museum in its decision noted that the debate could not take place without talking about BDS and that it was bound by the resolution.

On 30 May 2018, Ried filed a suit in the Administrative Court Munich, arguing that the refusal to grant him a venue violated his right to freedom of expression and freedom of assembly. The court, however, ruled in favor of the city. It argued that the resolution only prevents the expression of opinions either in favor or against BDS and that it therefore did not violate Ried's right to express a particular opinion about BDS.

On 17 October 2020, the Bavarian Administrative Court ruled in Ried's favor, citing that unless there is an immediate threat towards public peace, the city council cannot use racial discrimination as an excuse to obstruct political expression. Mayor Dieter Reiter expressed the ruling as regrettable. The city council appealed the decision to the Federal Administrative Court. On 20 January 2022, the Court dismissed the city's appeal, ruling that Munich's resolution restricting public facility access for BDS-related events was unconstitutional and unlawful.

==== Ruhrtriennale festival ====
In September 2018, the parliament of North Rhine-Westphalia, Germany's most populous state, adopted a resolution barring public institutions from hosting and supporting BDS groups and condemning "the antisemitic and anti-Israel BDS campaign". The anti-BDS resolution was sparked by the Ruhrtriennale's director Stefanie Carp's decision to invite the pro-BDS band Young Fathers to perform at the festival. In April 2020, Carp came under fire again for having invited Cameroonian philosopher Achille Mbembe to the festival because he wrote a foreword in 2015 to the book Apartheid Israel: The Politics of an Analogy.

==== German-Palestinian Women's Association v. Bonn ====
Bonn holds an annual festival called the Diversity! Bonn Culture and Encounter Festival (German: Vielfalt! – Bonner Kultur– und Begegnungsfest). A group connected to the BDS movement, the German-Palestinian Women's Association, wanted to participate in the 2019 edition of the festival as it had done many years in the past. However, on 14 May 2019, the City Council of Bonn had adopted a motion titled No place for the antisemitic BDS movement in Bonn calling upon all municipal institutions to deny facilities to BDS groups and groups pursuing BDS goals. Based on that motion, the City of Bonn decided to exclude the women's group.

The women's association filed an interim measure against the city's ban on its participation. The Administrative Court of Cologne instructed the City of Bonn to admit the women's association to the festival. In its verdict it held that the city's ban violated article 3(1), "All persons shall be equal before the law" and article 5(1), "Every person shall have the right freely to express and disseminate his opinions in speech, writing and pictures and to inform himself without hindrance from generally accessible sources" of the German Basic Law.

The Court stated that:

The motions of the Bonn City Council, as well as the motions of the parliament of North Rhine-Westphalia (20 September 2018) and the German Bundestag (17 May 2019), do not constitute legislative acts, but are political resolutions or expressions of political will. These motions alone cannot justify, from any legal perspective, the restriction of an existing legal right.

It instructed the city to let the women's association participate.

=== Spain ===
In September 2022, the Spanish Supreme Court declared that certain actions taken by the Reinosa local council, including co-operation with the BDS movement, were "discriminatory" and "infringe on basic rights". The Spanish pro-Israel nonprofit Acción y Comunicación sobre el Oriente, said the ruling sets a legal precedent.

=== United Kingdom ===
==== Public procurement ====
In February 2016, the British government, in response to several city councils having passed motions to boycott goods from Israeli settlements, issued a procurement policy forbidding public authorities from boycotts on ethical grounds. The policy was passed without any parliamentary debate. The government argued that

Public procurement should never be used as a tool to boycott tenders from suppliers based in other countries, except where formal legal sanctions, embargoes and restrictions have been put in place by the UK Government

and that such boycotts could harm "community cohesion" and Britain's "economic and international security". It further warned public authorities that they could face stiff penalties for continuing boycotts on ethical grounds, as they were unlawful under existing rules.

In December 2019, the British Conservative government under Prime Minister Boris Johnson announced that it would attempt to pass a law banning local councils from supporting BDS. The subsequent Sunak government introduced the Economic Activity of Public Bodies (Overseas Matters) Bill in 2023, which did not complete passage before a general election took place the following year.

==== Public pension funds investment ====
Government guidance for public pension funds, published in September 2016, stated that administrators should not "pursue policies that are contrary to UK foreign policy of defence policy".

In 2017, the Palestine Solidarity Campaign, with the support of the Quakers, the Campaign Against Arms Trade, and War on Want, launched court action against the application of the rule to public pension fund administrators. After winning its case in the High Court, it then lost in the Court of Appeal, before finally winning in the Supreme Court in April 2020. The campaign's legal challenge was based on the principle that the government did not have the power to ban "ethical pensions divestment". The court agreed that the government did not have the power to restrict the investment decisions of public pension funds to the degree attempted, and noted that it was employees' pension money and not public funds that were in question.

The Supreme Court's decision allowed Local Government Pension Scheme funds to divest from or boycott companies involved in Israel's illegal settlement programmes and siege of the Gaza Strip.

== Parliamentary condemnations ==
A dozen local and national parliaments have passed symbolic resolutions condemning BDS. Most of these condemnations have alleged that BDS is antisemitic.

=== Austria ===
On 27 February 2020, the Austrian National Council, the lower house of the Austrian Parliament unanimously adopted a non-binding resolution condemning all forms of antisemitism including "Israel-related antisemitism". It strongly condemned the BDS movement and urged the government not to provide aid to groups that express antisemitic views or "question Israel's right of existence".

Israel's Foreign Minister Israel Katz welcomed the resolution and asked other countries to adopt similar resolutions, as did the Transatlantic Friends of Israel group, an off-shot of the Jewish advocacy group the American Jewish Committee.

BDS slammed the "anti-Palestinian" resolution in a statement, claiming that it "contains outright lies, contradicts Austrian and international law, and undermines the important fight against real anti-Jewish racism". It further called for the "people of conscience in Austria" to defend the freedom of expression, including the right to boycott. Weeks before the vote, over 200 Palestinian organizations signed an open letter to Austrian parliament members urging them to reject the resolution.

=== Canada ===
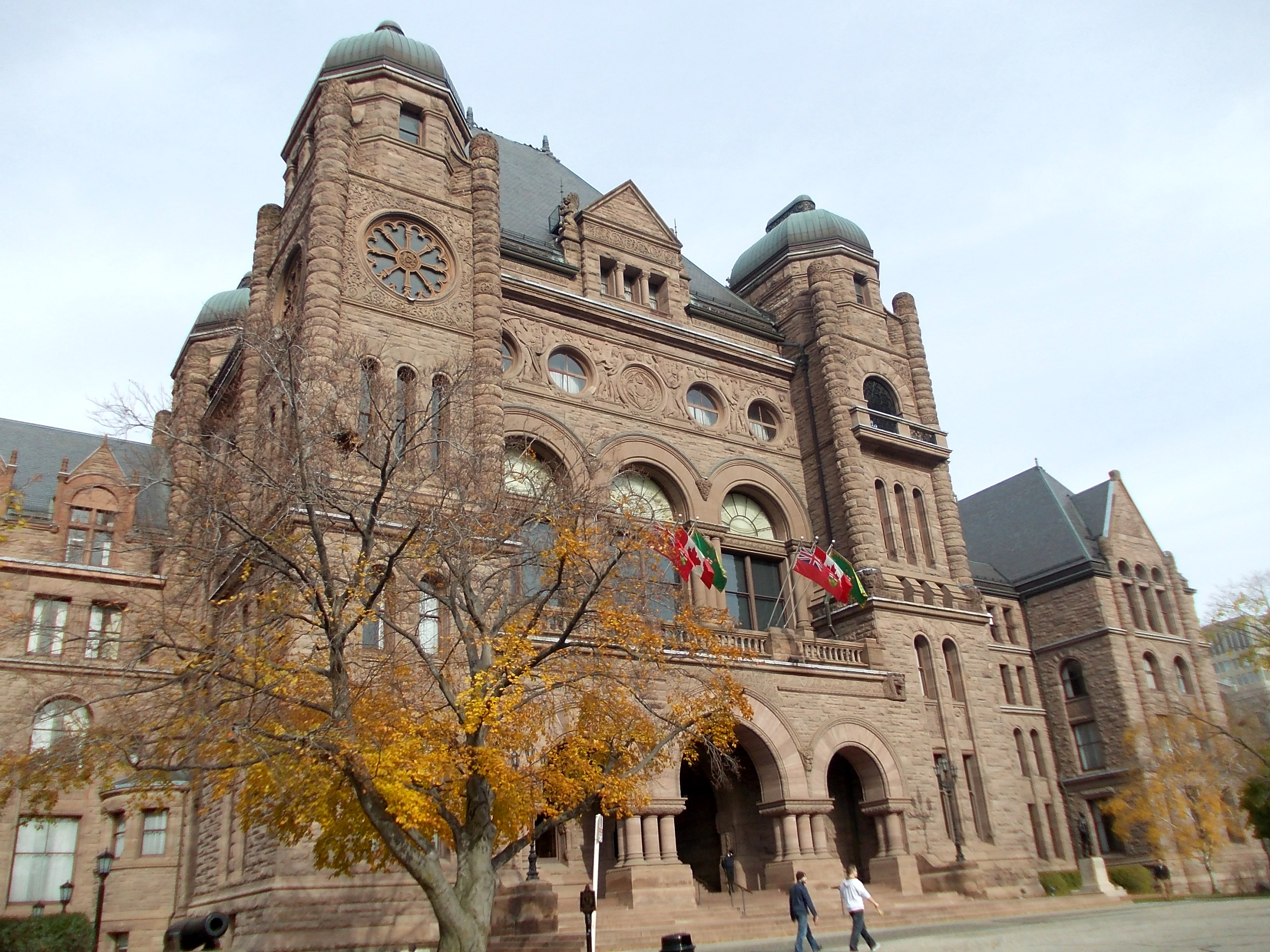
Legislative Assembly of Ontario

In February 2016, the Parliament of Canada passed a resolution in 229–51 vote condemning the BDS movement that read:

Given Canada and Israel share a long history of friendship as well as economic and diplomatic relations, the House rejected the Boycott, Divestment and Sanctions (BDS) movement, which promotes the demonization and delegitimization of the State of Israel, and called upon the government to condemn any and all attempts by Canadian organizations, groups or individuals to promote the BDS movement, both here at home and abroad.

The motion was supported by the Liberals and the Conservatives and opposed by the New Democratic Party and Bloc Québécois. It was welcomed by Jewish groups but decried by the National Council on Canada-Arab Relations which said that it went against the freedom of speech.

On 1 December 2016, a non-binding motion was passed in the Legislative Assembly of Ontario with 49 ayes and 5 nays that "calls on the legislature to stand against any movement that promotes hate, prejudice and racism" and "reject the 'differential treatment' of Israel by the BDS movement". The motion was supported by the two largest parties, the governing centrist Ontario Liberal Party and the opposition centre-right Progressive Conservative Party of Ontario, with only the social democratic Ontario New Democratic Party opposed. The motion was sponsored by Conservative legislator Gila Martow, who rhethorically asked "We would not be here supporting the Ku Klux Klan on our campuses so why are we allowing [the] BDS movement and other anti-Jewish and anti-Israel organizations to have demonstrations and use our campuses, which are taxpayer-funded?" The lawmakers that opposed the resolution argued that it silenced dissent.

The Centre for Israel and Jewish Affairs applauded the motion while Canadians for Justice and Peace in the Middle East denounced it, saying that it targets people for their political views.

=== Czech Republic ===
On 22 October 2019, the Chamber of Deputies passed a resolution "condemn[ing] all activities and statements by groups calling for a boycott of the State of Israel, its goods, services or citizens". The resolution also called for the government to not offer financial support to groups that promote a boycott of Israel. The resolution was introduced by Jan Bartošek, leader of the chamber's Christian Democrats caucus. Israel's ambassador to Prague expressed appreciation for the chamber's "unequivocal condemnation of antisemitism and steadfast support of Israel", while Israeli foreign minister Israel Katz tweeted his own thanks, calling "on more Parliaments to follow suit".

=== France ===
In March 2016, the Toulouse City Council passed a resolution condemning BDS.

=== Germany ===
In 2019, the German parliament passed a symbolic non-binding resolution named Resisting the BDS Movement with Determination – Combating Antisemitism declaring BDS antisemitic and stating that it was "reminiscent of the most terrible chapter in German history". The lower house voted down a competing motion from the far-right Alternative for Germany (AfD) party that called for BDS to be banned entirely. The Left Party refused to support the motion but said they also rejected BDS.

In response to the declaration, a group of 60 Israeli academics responded with a letter that criticized the motion and said it was part of a larger effort to delegitimize supporters of Palestine. Another similar letter was sent to the German government in June and signed by 240 Israeli and Jewish academics. The signatories stated that BDS is not an antisemitic movement and that boycotts are a legitimate and non-violent tool of resistance. Matan Peleg, CEO of the Zionist organization Im Tirtzu, slammed the letter, calling it "hypocrisy and ungratefulness, in which these professors earn their living at the expense of the Israeli taxpayer yet at the same time work to boycott and slander them."

In January 2020, five United Nations special rapporteurs published a letter they had sent to the German government expressing their opposition to the anti-BDS law. They argued that the law unduly interfered with the right of the German people to engage in political speech, namely to express support for BDS, and that criticising the Israeli government was not antisemitic. They published the letter because they did not receive any reply from the German authorities.

=== Spain ===
In June 2020, the parliament of the Balearic Islands passed a resolution condemning antisemitism as defined by the Working Definition of antisemitism. It condemned BDS and "calls to boycott Israeli products, scientists, artists and athletes from Israel" as antisemitism.

=== United States ===
On 23 July 2019, the U.S. House of Representatives passed resolution HR 246 with the vote 398–17 denouncing BDS. Sixteen Democrats, including Rashida Tlaib and Ilhan Omar, who both support BDS, and one Republican, Thomas Massie, voted against the resolution.

A separate resolution introduced by representative Omar, HR 496, which did not explicitly mention the BDS movement but was widely seen as a response to the House anti-BDS bill, affirmed the "right to participate in boycotts in pursuit of civil and human rights at home and abroad". The resolution was co-sponsored by representative John Lewis, despite his opposition to BDS, and supported by the ACLU and J Street. Commenting to The Jerusalem Post, Democrat Brad Sherman said that Omar's resolution should not be taken seriously: "I can't imagine that any committee is going to mark up or take seriously any pro-BDS resolution." He also said that he was not concerned about the movement's economic impact but opposed what he said was "an effort to delegitimize Israel".

Summary of resolutions relating to BDS in various US legislatures:

Assembly	Resolution	Year	Vote	Status	Purpose
Alabama Senate	SJR 6	2016		Passed	Denouncing BDS
Florida Senate	SR 894	2014	36-0	Passed	Denouncing academic boycotts of Israel
Indiana Senate	SR 74	2015			Expressing opposition to BDS
Pennsylvania House	HR 370	2015	193-0	Passed	Condemning BDS
Ohio House	HCR 10	2017	92-2	Passed	Condemning BDS
Pennsylvania State Senate	SR 136	2015	49-0	Passed	Condemning BDS
South Carolina House	HR 4635	2014		Passed	Denouncing academic boycotts of Israel
South Dakota House	HCR 1005	2019	25-10	Passed	Expressing support for Israel, condemning BDS
Tennessee Senate	SJR 170	2015	30-0	Passed	Condemning BDS and increasing antisemitism
Virginia House of Delegates	HJ 177	2016	86-5-9	Passed	Condemning the anti-Israel BDS movement
Philadelphia City Council	140029	2014		Passed	Condemning ASA's academic boycott of Israel
US House of Representatives	HR 246	2019	398-17	Passed	Denouncing BDS
US House of Representatives	HR 496	2019	n/a	Died	Affirming the right to political boycotting

==== Alabama ====
In 2016, the Alabama Senate passed SJR 6 condemning BDS.

==== Florida ====
On 11 April 2014, the upper house of the Florida Legislature, the Florida Senate, passed resolution SR 894 denouncing academic boycotts of Israel as "biased and hypocritical".

==== Illinois ====
Cook County passed a non-binding resolution on 29 July 2015, without debate calling on its pension fund to divest from foreign companies boycotting Israel. The chief sponsor of the resolution was Democrat Commissioner Bridget Gainer. Her colleague Commissioner Jesús "Chuy" García criticized the resolution for being one-sided. Co-sponsors of the resolution were Democrats Richard Boykin, John Fritchey, Larry Suffredin, Luis Arroyo Jr., Robert Steele, Deborah Sims, Stanley Moore and Joan Patricia Murphy and Republicans Timothy Schneider, Gregg Goslin and Sean M. Morrison. On 24 September 2015, the Chicago City Council passed a similar resolution urging the Municipal Employees' Annuity and Benefit Fund of Chicago to divest from companies boycotting Israel.

==== Ohio ====
The Ohio House of Representatives passed HCR 10 on 5 December 2017, with the vote 92–2, condemning BDS. The resolution was passed unanimously, 30–0, by the state Senate. The Christian Zionist group Proclaiming Justice to the Nations welcomed the resolution.

==== Indiana ====
In May 2015, the upper house of the Indiana Legislature, the Indiana Senate, passed resolution SR 74, "expressing opposition to the anti-Jewish and anti-Israel Boycott, Divestment and Sanctions campaign" which it claimed was "seeking to undermine the Jewish people's right to self-determination". It also claimed the Movement's agenda was "antithetical and deeply damaging to the cause of peace, justice, equality, democracy, and human rights" and "promoting a climate of hatred, intimidation, intolerance and violence against Jews". The resolution had previously unanimously passed the Indiana House of Representatives as House Resolution 59.

The National Lawyers Guild and a number of other American organizations involved in the Israeli–Palestinian conflict signed an open letter to Indiana Governor Mike Pence asking him to repudiate the resolution.

==== Pennsylvania ====
The Pennsylvania General Assembly on 24 June 2015, unanimously adopted HR 370, a resolution condemning BDS. The resolution denounced it as "one of the main vehicles for spreading antisemitism and advocating the elimination of the Jewish state".

==== South Dakota ====
On 13 February 2019, the South Dakota Senate passed HCR 1005, declaring its opposition to and condemning BDS. The resolution passed with 25 yeas and 10 nays.

==== Tennessee ====
On 9 April 2015, the Tennessee General Assembly passed a resolution formally condemning BDS. The resolution passed the upper house by a vote of 30–0 and the lower house by a vote of 93–1. The resolution, the first of its kind to be passed by a state government, declared that BDS is "one of the main vehicles for spreading antisemitism and advocating the elimination of the Jewish state" and "undermine[s] the Jewish people's right to self-determination, which they are fulfilling in the State of Israel". The bill was introduced by State Senator Dolores Gresham and co-sponsored with State Representative Sheila Butt. In an interview, Gresham stated that the resolution is proof that the state legislature "chooses to preserve its values by publicly condemning this blatantly antisemitic, anti-Israel bigotry, and send a clear message that Tennessee condemns such views".

==== Virginia ====
In March 2016, the Virginia General Assembly passed a resolution condemning BDS. In the House, the resolution passed with 86 ayes, five nays, and nine abstentions. In the Senate it passed by acclamation. The resolution was welcomed by the pro-Israeli groups Proclaiming Justice to the Nations and the Jewish Community Relations Council of Greater Washington.

== See also ==
- Reactions to Boycott, Divestment and Sanctions
- Strategic lawsuit against public participation
- Working Definition of Antisemitism

== Sources ==
=== Books ===
- Abunimah, Ali (3 March 2014). The Battle for Justice in Palestine. Haymarket Books. pp. 133–. ISBN 978-1-60846-347-3.
- Tripp, Charles (25 February 2013). The Power and the People: Paths of Resistance in the Middle East. Cambridge University Press. ISBN 978-0-521-80965-8.
- Kittrie, Orde F. (2016). Lawfare: Law as a Weapon of War. Oxford University Press. pp. 430–. ISBN 978-0-19-026357-7.

=== Legal opinion ===
- "Wielding Antidiscrimination Law to Suppress the Movement for Palestinian Rights". Harvard Law Review. 10 February 2020.
- "S.C. Code Ann. 11-35-5300 (2015)". Harvard Law Review. 10 May 2016.
- Mansur, Sarah (1 May 2019). "Free speech rights and the rise of anti-BDS legislation". Chicago Daily Law Bulletin.
- Sobel, Nathaniel (19 March 2019). "Breaking Down the Combating BDS Act of 2019 and First Amendment Challenges to State Anti-BDS Laws". Lawfare.
- Cuffman, Timothy (29 May 2018). "The State Power to Boycott a Boycott: The Thorny Constitutionality of State Anti-BDS Laws". Columbia Journal of Transnational Law. doi:10.2139/ssrn.3186369. SSRN 3186369.
- de Leo, Andreina (16 June 2020). "Baldassi and Others v. France: Criminal Convictions of BDS Activists Violate Freedom of Expression under the European Convention on Human Rights". Opinio Juris.
- Bot, Michiel (2019). "The right to boycott: BDS, law, and politics in a global context". Transnational Legal Theory. 10 (3–4): 421–445. doi:10.1080/20414005.2019.1672134. S2CID 203154725.
- "Boycotting a Boycott: A First Amendment Analysis of Nationwide Anti-Boycott Legislation" (PDF). Rutgers Law Review. 70 (5). Rutgers University: 1304. 15 May 2020.
- Zanotti, Jim; Weiss, Martin A.; Brannon, Valerie C.; Elsea, Jennifer K. (3 December 2019). "Israel and the Boycott, Divestment, and Sanctions (BDS) Movement" (PDF). Congressional Research Service.

=== Journal articles ===
- White, Ben (1 February 2020). "Delegitimizing Solidarity: Israel Smears Palestine Advocacy as Anti-Semitic". Journal of Palestine Studies. 49 (2): 65–79. doi:10.1525/jps.2020.49.2.65. ISSN 0377-919X.

=== Palestine Legal ===
- "Oklahoma". Palestine Legal. 1 June 2020.
- "Illinois". Palestine Legal. 1 April 2020.
- "North Carolina". Palestine Legal. 31 July 2017.
- "New York". Palestine Legal. 17 October 2019.
- "Florida". Palestine Legal. 17 December 2019.
- "Alabama". Palestine Legal.
- "Georgia". Palestine Legal. 18 May 2020.
- "Kentucky". Palestine Legal. 16 April 2019.
- "Maryland". Palestine Legal. 23 October 2017.
- "Michigan". Palestine Legal. 18 January 2017.
- "Arizona". Palestine Legal. 3 March 2019.
- "California". Palestine Legal. 25 February 2018.
- "Colorado". Palestine Legal.
- "Mississippi". Palestine Legal.
- "Kansas". Palestine Legal. 16 April 2019.
- "Missouri". Palestine Legal. 14 July 2020.
- "Iowa". Palestine Legal. 1 April 2020.

=== Global Freedom of Expression ===
- "Arkansas Times LP v. Mark Waldrip". Global Freedom of Expression. 14 March 2019.
- "Koontz v. Watson". Global Freedom of Expression. 3 August 2020.
- "Baldassi & Others v. France". Global Freedom of Expression. 11 August 2020.
- "Mikkel Jordahl v. Mark Brnovich". Global Freedom of Expression. 11 August 2020.

=== News ===
- Ajeen, Ayan (12 March 2020). "Civil Rights Groups Condemn Georgia Legislators' Effort to Protect Unconstitutional 'Israel Boycott' Law at the Behest of Israeli Consulate in Atlanta". Council on American-Islamic Relations.
- "South Carolina Governor Signs Anti-Boycott Bill". The Tower. 5 June 2015.
- "Lawsuit: Maryland's anti-BDS law 'chills' free speech - Middle East". Al Jazeera. 10 January 2019.
- Saltzberg, Emma (22 November 2019). "Poll: Democrats Are Divided on BDS". Jewish Currents.
- Redden, Elizabeth (21 April 2016). "Israel Boycott Battle Heads to Court". Inside Higher Ed.
- Redden, Elizabeth (6 February 2019). "Judge Dismisses Israel Boycott Case". Inside Higher Ed.
- Redden, Elizabeth (12 December 2017). "Suit Against American Studies Group Dismissed". Inside Higher Ed.
- Nguyen, Phan (22 February 2012). "Who's who behind the Olympia Food Co-op lawsuit". Mondoweiss.
- "Former Olympia Food Co-op Board Members Move to End Seven-Year Lawsuit Over Boycott of Israeli Goods". Center for Constitutional Rights. 16 November 2017.
- Nguyen, Phan (29 May 2015). "StandWithUs invests nearly half a million dollars in ongoing anti-BDS lawsuit against Olympia Food Co-Op". Mondoweiss.
- "5 Olympia Food Co-op members who sued to end Israeli boycott must pay $160K". BDS Movement. 12 July 2012.
- "Appeals Court Upholds Olympia Food Co-op's Boycott of Israeli Goods". Center for Constitutional Rights. 7 April 2014.
- "WA Court Dismisses Seven-Year Lawsuit Over Boycott of Israeli Goods". Center for Constitutional Rights. 9 March 2018.
- Dolsten, Josefin (23 October 2015). "French high court confirms BDS activists' discrimination convictions". Jewish Telegraphic Agency.
- Wright, Jared (18 March 2016). "Hickenlooper signs Nordberg-Moreno bill to fight anti-Israel boycott". Colorado Politics.
- Liphshiz, Cnaan (22 June 2020). "In first, Spanish state calls attempts to boycott Israel a form of anti-Semitism". Jewish Telegraphic Agency.
- Kane, Alex (25 March 2019). "Right-Wing Donor Adam Milstein Has Spent Millions of Dollars to Stifle the BDS Movement and Attack Critics of Israeli Policy". The Intercept.
- Stoil, Rebecca Shimoni (24 July 2015). "Illinois's newest law fights divestment with divestment". The Times of Israel.
- Barton, Ryland (18 November 2018). "Bevin To Require State Contractors Promise They Don't Boycott Israel". 89.3 WFPL News Louisville.
- Bob, Yonah Jeremy (16 October 2016). "How US states are countering the BDS movement against Israel". The Jerusalem Post.
- Chokshi, Niraj (15 August 2019). "The Anti-Boycott Law Israel Used to Bar Both Omar and Tlaib". The New York Times.
- Schmidt, Peter (2 January 2014). "Backlash Against Israel Boycott Puts American Studies Assn. on Defensive". Chronicle of Higher Education.
- Bakeman, Jessica (27 December 2013). "Klein and Hikind want penalties for colleges that boycott Israel". Politico PRO.
- Offenhartz, Jake (13 September 2017). "Roger Waters Shows Will Go On Despite Nassau County Anti-BDS Law". Gothamist.
- "NYCLU Warns Nassau County Against Pulling Roger Waters Performances over Political Views". New York Civil Liberties Union. 11 September 2017.
- Lewis, Renee (25 August 2015). "New York Senate passes bill penalizing academic group for Israel boycott". Al Jazeera America.
- Seiler, Casey (28 January 2014). "Senate passes Klein's don't-boycott-Israel bill". Capitol Confidential.
- "Opinion - A Chill on Speech". The New York Times. 4 February 2014.
- Goldberg, Michelle (29 January 2014). "New York's Outrageous Attempt to Ban Academic BDS". The Nation.
- Norton, Ben (6 June 2016). "The new McCarthyism is pro-Israel: Legal groups slam NY Gov. Andrew Cuomo for creating "unconstitutional" blacklist of BDS supporters". Salon. Archived from the original on 6 June 2016.
- "Nassau official calls on county to cancel Roger Waters concert". News 12 Long Island. 12 July 2017.
- "ZOA Praises Supervisor and Council of Town of Hempstead (Largest U.S. Town) for Passing Anti-Boycott Bill". Zionist Organization of America. 10 June 2016.
- Weinthal, Benjamin; Romirowsky, Asaf (11 May 2016). "How New York can help stop Europe's rampaging Israel boycotters". New York Post.
- Cuomo, Andrew (10 June 2016). "Gov. Andrew Cuomo: If you boycott Israel, New York state will boycott you". The Washington Post.
- Redden, Elizabeth (9 March 2017). "New York Senate Passes Anti-BDS Bills". Inside Higher Ed.
- "In Legislative Upset, Missouri Anti-BDS Bill Fails". US Campaign for Palestinian Rights. 22 May 2018.
- Bandler, Aaron (20 May 2020). "Oklahoma Legislature Passes Anti-BDS Law". Jewish Journal.
- Forman, Carmen (4 March 2020). "Oklahoma House passes pro-Israel bill". The Oklahoman.
- Briggs, James (3 March 2016). "Indiana lawmakers want to pull retirement money from companies that boycott Israel". Indianapolis Star.
- "Indiana House unanimously passes anti-BDS bill". The Times of Israel. 10 January 2016.
- "Iowa General Assembly passes anti-BDS legislation". The Times of Israel. 22 February 2016.
- "OPPOSE SF 2281 and HF 2331: Unconstitutional Prohibition on Contracts With Businesses That Boycott Israel" (PDF). ACLU of Iowa. 24 February 2016.
- Friedman, Lara (20 February 2020). "States Are Moving to Class Criticism of Israel as Antisemitism". Jewish Currents.
- Powers, Scott (1 May 2019). "Group of Jewish Floridians hammer anti-Semitism bill, call for veto". Florida Politics.
- Bennhold, Katrin (17 May 2019). "German Parliament Deems B.D.S. Movement Anti-Semitic". The New York Times.
- "UN experts publish letter criticising German anti-BDS law". Middle East Eye. 17 January 2020.
- Oltermann, Philip (17 May 2019). "German parliament declares Israel boycott campaign antisemitic". The Guardian.
- Joffre, Tzvi (12 June 2019). "240 Israeli, Jewish academics urge against calling BDS antisemitic". The Jerusalem Post.
- Jacobs, Michael; Schechter, Dave (21 November 2017). "Anti-BDS Vote Divides 2 Top Georgia Democrats". Atlanta Jewish Times.
- "Georgia: Legislative Advocacy Opposing Anti-BDS Bills". Center for Constitutional Rights. 18 April 2016.
- "Civil rights groups sue over US state's 'Israel boycott law'". Al Jazeera. 10 February 2020.
- "US legislator: Israel 'asked me' to introduce bill against groups boycotting it". Middle East Monitor. 18 November 2020.
- "Virginia General Assembly passes anti-BDS resolution". Jewish Telegraphic Agency. 10 March 2016.

=== Bills and resolutions ===
- Orr, Arthur (2016). "SB 81". LegiScan. Alabama Senate. "Public contracts, governmental entities precluded from entering into contracts with entities that boycott certain persons or entities with whom this state enjoys open trade"
- Fann, Karen (2020). "SB 1143". LegiScan. Arizona Senate. "Anti-semitism; crime reporting; aggravating factor."
- Klein, Jeffrey (2014). "S 6438". LegiScan. New York Senate. "Prohibits the use of state aid by colleges and universities to fund or provide membership in academic institutions that are boycotting a country or higher education institutions of a country."
- Phillips, Elaine (2017). "S 2492". LegiScan. New York Senate. "Relates to purchasing restrictions and persons boycotting American allies."
- Phillips, Elaine (2017). "S 2493". LegiScan. New York Senate. "Prohibits certain student organizations which participate in discrimination or intolerance from receiving funding from SUNY, CUNY or community colleges."
- Klein, Jeffrey (2017). "S 4837". LegiScan. New York Senate. "Prohibits the use of state aid by colleges and universities to fund or provide membership in academic institutions that are boycotting a country or higher education institutions of a country."
- Bloom, Richard (2016). "AB 2844". LegiScan. California Assembly. "An act to add Section 2010 to the Public Contract Code, relating to public contracts."
- McBride, Mark; Weaver, Darrell (2020). "HB 3967". LegiScan. Oklahoma House. "State contracts; declaring Israel a prominent trading partner; prohibiting state contracts without certain written certification; effective date."
- Bosma, Brian (2016). "HB 1378". LegiScan. Indiana House. "Divestment from boycott Israel businesses. Requires the public retirement system to divest from businesses that engage in action or inaction to boycott, divest from, or sanction Israel. Provides for notice to businesses, reinvestment, and civil immunity. Requires certain reports to the legislative council. Makes a conforming amendment."
- Fine, Randy; Moskowitz, Jared (2018). "HB 741". LegiScan. Florida House. "Prohibits company that is on Scrutinized Companies that Boycott Israel List or that is engaged in boycott of Israel from bidding on, submitting proposal for, or entering into or renewing contract with agency or local governmental entity for goods or services; provides exceptions; requires specified provision in such contracts; requires company to make specified certification in specified circumstances; provides for preemption."
- Carroll, Jonathan (2020). "HB 4049". LegiScan. Illinois House. "Amends the Elementary, Secondary, and Higher Education Article of the Illinois Human Rights Act. Defines "anti-Semitism". Provides that an institution of elementary, secondary, or higher education commits a civil rights violation if it fails to treat anti-Semitism in an identical manner to discrimination motivated by race. Describes anti-Semitism. Provides that nothing in the new provisions infringes on the constitutional protections for free speech or may be construed to conflict with federal or State discrimination laws."

=== Other ===
- "State Anti-BDS Legislation". Jewish Virtual Library.
- Telhami, Shibley (8 January 2020). "What do Americans think of the BDS movement, aimed at Israel?". Brookings.
- "Lawsuit: ASA's Boycott of Israel Violates Law Professors sue American Studies Association". Brandeis Center. 20 April 2016.
- "Wiesenthal Centre Shocked by Blood Libel Accusation of Deicide Against the Jews by French Extreme-Left Political Leader". Simon Wiesenthal Center. 16 July 2020.
- "Fact Sheet - HB 16-1284". Friends of Sabeel Colorado. 10 March 2014.
- Essley White, Liz (1 May 2019). "How a bill that seeks to shut down boycotts of Israel is spreading state-to-state". Center for Public Integrity.
- "One way to silence Israel boycotts? Get lawmakers to pass anti-BDS bills". USA Today. 1 May 2019.
- "Ten things to know about anti-boycott legislation". Palestine Legal. 17 January 2020.
