= Israel Anti-Boycott Act =

Proposed federal U.S. bill, designed to reduce boycotts against Israel

- Long title: To amend the Export Administration Act of 1979 to include in the prohibitions on boycotts against allies of the United States boycotts fostered by international governmental organizations against Israel and to direct the Export-Import Bank of the United States to oppose boycotts against Israel, and for other purposes.
- Announced in: the 115th United States Congress
- Sponsored by: Rep. Peter Roskam (R, IL-06)
- Number of co-sponsors: 292

Codification
- Acts affected: Export Administration Act of 1979; Export–Import Bank of the United States

Legislative history
- Introduced in the House as H.R. 1697 by Peter Roskam (R, IL-06) on March 23, 2017; Committee consideration by United States House Committee on Foreign Affairs; United States House Committee on Financial Services

The Israel Anti-Boycott Act (IABA) (H.R. 1697; S. 720) was a proposed anti-BDS law and amendment to the Export Administration Act of 1979 designed to allow U.S. states to enact laws requiring contractors to sign pledges promising not to boycott any goods from Israel, or their contracts would be terminated, and to make it a federal crime, punishable by a maximum sentence of 20 years imprisonment, for American citizens to encourage or participate in boycotts against Israel and Israeli settlements in the occupied Palestinian territories.

The proposed law was a response to the BDS movement's call for boycotts, divestment and sanctions against Israel. As of 2020, 32 state legislatures have already passed bills similar to IABA. If the law was passed in the federal legislature, it would be easier to enforce. Critics of the law and supporters of BDS claim that it is unconstitutional. They claim that participation in politically motivated boycotts is a form of free speech protected by the First Amendment and that anti-BDS laws are a form of lawfare.

IABA was drafted by Senators Ben Cardin (D-Maryland) and Rob Portman (R-Ohio) and introduced to the 115th session of Congress in 2018. It had 58 cosponsors in the Senate, and 292 cosponsors in the House (216 Republicans, 76 Democrats). The act consisted of House and Senate bills H.R. 1697 and S. 720 and died in Congress. In the 115th session of Congress it had 58 cosponsors in the Senate (42 Republicans, 15 Democrats, 1 Independent). Rep Lee Zeldin (R-N.Y.) introduced bills by the same name in the 116th Congress and the 117th Congress. Both of these bills were referred to the House Committee on Foreign Affairs, which did not pass them out of committee, and they died there.

== Legislative history ==
The bill was introduced by the identical House and Senate bills H.R. 1697 and S. 720 on March 23, 2017, by Republican Representative Peter Roskam and Democratic Senator Benjamin Cardin respectively.

The purpose of the bill was to amend the Export Administration Act of 1979 and the Export-Import Bank Act of 1945 to bar US citizens from supporting boycotts against Israel, including its settlements. Violations would be subject to minimum civil penalty of $250,000 and a maximum criminal penalty of $1 million and 20 years in prison.

The bill cited the United Nations Human Rights Council's (UNHRC) March 2016 resolution calling for the creation of a database of companies operating in the occupied Palestinian territories as an example of a boycott supposedly covered by the law. Anyone choosing to not buy from companies listed in the database could, according to the bill's critics, be in violation and risk facing penalties or even jail time.

The House Foreign Affairs Committee passed an amended version of the bill on June 28, 2018, and on March 3, 2018, Cardin released an amended version in the Senate. The amended bill removed the jail time provisions, but knowing violations of the bill could still lead to criminal financial penalties of up to $1 million. All three versions of the bill were unconstitutional, according to those critics who criticized it on First Amendment grounds. The amended versions of the bill were also criticized by proponents of anti-BDS laws. Republicans Alan Clemmons and Joseph Sabag of the Israeli American Council wrote in an op-ed in The Hill:

In essence, the amended Israel Anti-Boycott Act has not merely been amended. Rather, it eliminates the fundamental operating provisions of the original bill by only providing impermanent, easily revocable protections for the Israeli-controlled territories the UNHRC is specifically seeking to target. The blame for this unraveling belongs to AIPAC, the American Israel Public Affairs Committee, whose staff designed the bill and ultimately watered it down in response to hostile Democratic demands as it proceeded through the legislative process.... The Foreign Affairs Committee amendments are a clear capitulation to Democrats' embrace of at least some forms of BDS (so-called "settlements BDS"). For such a law to pass in a Republican Congress with a Republican president would set a dangerously low ceiling for pro-Israel legislation – a lower one than existed under Obama.

In late 2018, attempts were made from both sides of the aisle to include the bill in the appropriations bill. The attempts were criticized by Senator Bernie Sanders (I-Vermont) and Dianne Feinstein (D-California) who stated:

We believe including this bill would violate the spirit of cooperation and commitment that Senate appropriators have made to oppose controversial riders on appropriations bills, ... While we do not support the Boycott, Divestment and Sanctions (BDS) movement, we remain resolved to our constitutional oath to defend the right of every American to express their views peacefully without fear of or actual punishment by the government....

Senator Kirsten Gillibrand, who originally co-sponsored the bill, withdrew her support from it in 2017, citing concerns over free speech. She stated that she remained opposed to the BDS movement. The pro-Israeli lobby group AIPAC criticized her change of heart.

== Combating BDS Act ==
In 2019, Senator Marco Rubio, who cosponsored the Israel Anti-Boycott Act, introduced the Combating BDS Act, cosponsored by Senator Cory Gardner (R-Colorado), Senator Mitch McConnell (R-Kentucky), and Senator Roy Blunt (R-Missouri). The bill is meant to enable states to pass anti-boycott legislation with federal blessing. It has received reception similar to IABA. On February 5, 2019, the Senate passed the bill and other Middle East policy bills. As of May 2019 it seems as though the House will not be taking up the bill in the foreseeable future.

== Support and opposition ==
Supporters of the bill argue that it does not stymie free speech. The bills co-sponsor Senator Marco Rubio (R-Florida) tweeted: "Opposition to our bill isn’t about free speech. Companies are FREE to boycott Israel. But local and state governments should be free to end contracts with companies that do". Eugene Kontorovich who has helped states draft anti-BDS laws has argued that they aren't about free speech, but that those wishing to boycott Israel should not benefit from government contracts or taxpayer money.

AIPAC continued to support the IABA and similar legislation, saying "(the legislation) protects the First Amendment rights of those who choose to boycott Israel in their personal capacity." However, organizations like the ACLU disagree and have sought lawsuits on those grounds.

== See also ==
- Boycotts of Israel
- Law for Prevention of Damage to State of Israel through Boycott
