= Mark McBride =

American politician

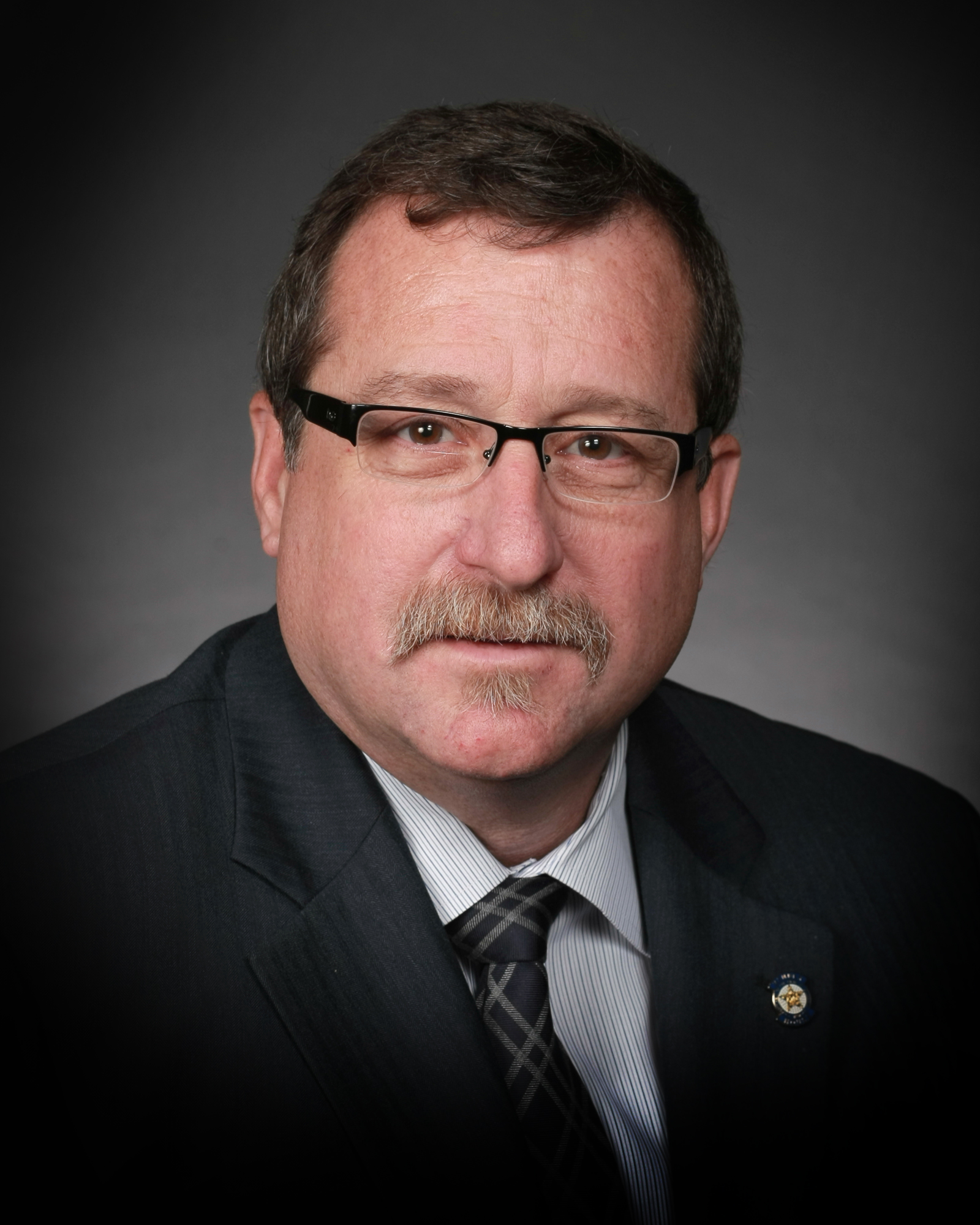
- Official portrait

Member of the Oklahoma House of Representatives from the 53rd district
- In office November 14, 2012 – November 20, 2024
- Preceded by: Randy Terrill
- Succeeded by: Jason Blair

Personal details
- Born: April 3, 1961 (age 65) Moore, Oklahoma, U.S.
- Party: Republican
- Education: Northwestern Oklahoma State University

Mark McBride (born April 3, 1961) is an American politician who served in the Oklahoma House of Representatives representing the 53rd district from 2012 to 2024.

== Early life ==
McBride's family has lived in Moore, Oklahoma since the 1940s. He graduated from Moore High School in 1979 and was an active participant in National FFA Organization. He briefly attended Northwestern Oklahoma State University before leaving to go into farming.

== Career ==
McBride has also been an outspoken defender of the oil and gas industry, defending tax breaks for the industry and authoring bills to limit opposition to proposed fossil fuel projects. In 2019, a leaked recording revealed that the oil and gas industry had been behind the language enacted in a large number of US states, including language authored by McBride which criminalized protests against fossil fuel projects.

In March 2020, McBride authored HB 3967, an anti-BDS bill which prohibits the State of Oklahoma from contracting with any individual or company that boycotts goods or services from Israel. McBride, who has no background in law or international affairs, explained his motivation as primarily religious, saying "The Bible is clear that those who bless Israel will be blessed and those who curse Israel will be cursed."

In 2020, he was re-elected by default. In 2024 he retired due to term limits.
