= Combating BDS Act =

Proposed federal US bill, designed to combat boycotts against Israel

- Announced in: the 116th United States Congress
- Sponsored by: Sen. Marco Rubio (R-Florida)

Legislative history
- Introduced in the Senate as S. 1 by Sen. Marco Rubio (R-Florida) on February 5, 2019

The Combating BDS Act (S. 1) is an anti-BDS bill passed by the Senate in the 116th United States Congress intended to counter the BDS movement's call for boycotts, divestment and sanctions against Israel.

The bill was introduced in January 2019 on the first day of the 116th session of Congress in a package of four bills related to the Middle East. Three of the other bills were uncontroversial. Marco Rubio (R-Florida) was the primary sponsor of the bill and the co-sponsors were James Risch (R-Idaho), Cory Gardner, (R-Colorado), and Mitch McConnell, (R-Kentucky).

A week after the package was introduced in the Senate, it was blocked by Democrats from moving forward. On February 5, 2020, it was passed in the Senate with the vote 77 to 23, with 22 Democrats and Rand Paul voting nay.

== Free speech issues ==
The bill was criticized by several parties on grounds that economic boycotts are protected by the First Amendment and some critics alleged that the bill was unconstitutional. Among its critics were, Rebecca Vilkomerson, executive director of Jewish Voice for Peace, presidential candidate Bernie Sanders, Rand Paul (R-Kentucky), Representative Rashida Tlaib, antiwar group Code Pink, J Street, and the American Civil Liberties Union.

Paul gave a speech in the Senate explaining his opposition to the bill:

[B]oycotting or protesting is something so fundamentally American, so fundamentally associated with the First Amendment that even if we don't like what you are boycotting, even if we don't like what you are saying, that in America we allow that to happen because that is what freedom of speech is about ...

Boycotting is speech. I went to a Baptist college. I remember when I was in college that the Baptist women of the Southwest Baptist Convention didn't like pornography being out in front at the store where kids could view it. Do you know what they did? They marched. They didn't hurt anybody. They didn't commit violence. They did nonviolent protests by marching in front of the utility stores until—guess what—because of the economic boycott and the bad press, the people put the pornographic magazines behind the counter, and only adults were allowed to buy them and look at them. That is from a boycott.

We boycotted English tea to found a country. ...

Are we here to say that we are going to forbid boycotting, that you can't do business with the government? Here is the problem. People say: Oh, it is a privilege to do business with the government. What if you are a physician and half of your business is with the government? What if you are a nurse? Half of the healthcare in our country is paid for by the government. What if you are a teacher and you work in the public schools? Are we going to ask all of these people to take a litmus test that they are not going to boycott or protest against their government's policy? What kind of country would we live in? Yet it is groupthink around here. Everybody is so paranoid and saying: Oh, we can't object to this lobby. Because this lobby is so powerful, we can't object to them. Look, it isn't about the ideas; it is about the freedom of speech.

== See also ==
- Anti-BDS laws
- Israel Anti-Boycott Act
