= Longshoremen v. Allied International, Inc. =

- Supreme Court of the United States

Argued January 18, 1982 Decided April 20, 1982
- Full case name: International Longshoremen's Association, AFL-CIO v. Allied International, Inc.
- Citations: 456 U.S. 212 (more) 102 S.Ct. 1656; 72 L. Ed. 2d 21
- Argument: Oral argument
- Opinion announcement: Opinion announcement

Case history
- Prior: Allied Int'l v. Int'l Longshoremen's Ass'n, 492 F. Supp. 334 (D. Mass. 1980); reversed, 640 F.2d 1368 (1st Cir. 1981); cert. granted, 454 U.S. 814 (1981).

Holding
- That the Longshoremen's Association by refusing to unload Soviet cargo in the United States had undertaken an unfair labor practice as defined by § 8(b) (4)(B) of the National Labor Relations Act.

Court membership
- Chief Justice Warren E. Burger Associate Justices William J. Brennan Jr. · Byron White; Thurgood Marshall · Harry Blackmun; Lewis F. Powell Jr. · William Rehnquist; John P. Stevens · Sandra Day O'Connor

Case opinion
- Majority: Powell, joined by unanimous

Laws applied
- National Labor Relations Act

International Longshoremen's Association, AFL-CIO v. Allied International, Inc., 456 U.S. 212 (1982), was a United States Supreme Court case which held that a trade union that refused to unload cargo from the Soviet Union in protest against the invasion of Afghanistan had engaged in a secondary boycott, an unfair labor practice under the National Labor Relations Act.

== Background ==
Allied International was an importer of wood products from the Soviet Union and had contracts with a shipping firm to bring the products to the United States. The shipping company in turn contracted a stevedoring company to unload the cargo, whose workers were members of the International Longshoremen's Association (ILA). In 1980, following the Soviet invasion of Afghanistan, the ILA had resolved not to load or unload Soviet cargo destined for US ports. As a result of this boycott, Allied's shipping was disrupted and the company had to renegotiate its contracts. Allied International sued the union.

== Opinion of the Court ==
Justice Powell rejected the ILA's defense, noting: "as understandable and even commendable as the ILA's ultimate objectives may be, the certain effect of its action is to impose a heavy burden on neutral employers. It is just such a burden, as well as widening of industrial strife, that the secondary boycott provisions were designed to prevent." The Court argued that while ILA claimed to be boycotting the Soviet Union, it was in effect boycotting a third party (the employer). The Court viewed the boycott as a political act, rather than economic. It dismissed claims that of First Amendment protection, as the petition clause relates to expression towards domestic government, not foreign ones.

== Subsequent developments ==
John Rubin, writing on the significance of the case, noted:

By abandoning the requirement of a primary labor dispute, the Court apparently extended the statutory ban to all politically motivated strikes and picketing. Every employer is arguably neutral in the political endeavors of its employees or the union and is, therefore, entitled to the statute's protection. The Allied decision also forebodes a complete ban on the use of collective bargaining in pursuit of political objectives since section 8(e) of the Act, in essence, prohibits a union and employer from implementing a secondary boycott through a voluntary agreement. This blunt-edged approach gives insufficient consideration to the important first amendment questions raised by political activities and to policy questions concerning the proper scope of union representation of members' interests.

Julius Getman, writing at the time as Professor of Law at Yale University, noted the incongruity in the Court's reasoning between this case and NAACP v. Claiborne Hardware Co., which upheld the right to engage in boycotts:

Both unions and employers have cause to be confused and offended. Why is their speech and speech-related conduct judged by such different standards? ... The majority opinion in Claibome Hardware offers an explanation. In labor cases, the regulation of speech is permissible because of the "strong governmental interest in certain forms of economic regulation, even though such regulation may have an incidental effect on the rights of speech and association." Thus, "secondary boycotts and picketing by labor unions may be prohibited." ... The distinction drawn between the economic activity involved in the labor cases and the political activity relating to public issues is analytically unsound, historically inaccurate, and culturally myopic....To suggest that one goal is of greater public concern than the other is to view labor through the Court's artificially created prism by which collective bargaining becomes dissociated from any broader, nobler, more enduring purpose.
