= Elaine Nekritz =

American politician (born 1957)

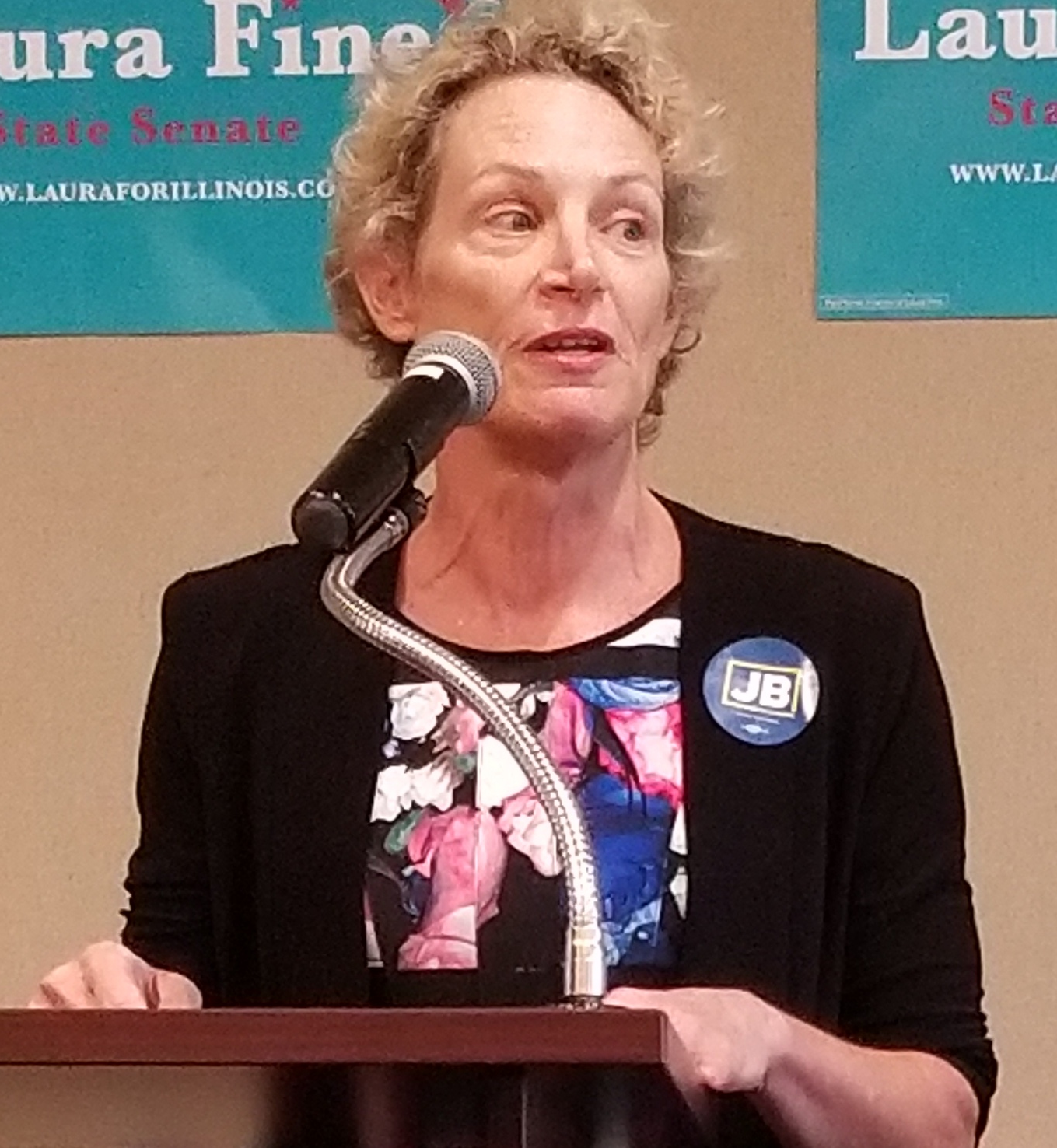
- Nekritz in 2018

Member of the Illinois House of Representatives from the 57th district
- In office January 2003 – October 2017
- Preceded by: Elizabeth Coulson
- Succeeded by: Jonathan Carroll

Personal details
- Born: December 11, 1957 (age 68) Wichita, Kansas, U.S.
- Party: Democratic
- Spouse: Barry Nekritz
- Education: University of Michigan
- Profession: Real estate attorney

Elaine Nekritz (born December 11, 1957) is an American attorney and politician. She served as a Democratic member of the Illinois House of Representatives, representing the 57th District from 2001 to 2017. She was formerly the Democratic Committeeman of Northfield Township, Illinois.

Prior to her election as representative of the 57th district, Nekritz was a member of the law firm of Altheimer and Gray, working as a real estate attorney and later becoming a partner with the firm. She also worked as legislative aide to Jeffrey Schoenberg, now the state senator for the 9th District, while he served as the state representative of the 58th District.

Nekritz was born and raised in Wichita, Kansas. She currently resides in Northbrook, Illinois, with her husband, Barry.

== Issues ==
Representative Nekritz co-sponsored SB-1; a plan that amended state employee pension plans by drastically reducing the constitutionally protected benefits of Illinois state employees in retirement. The Illinois Supreme Court ultimately found these legislative changes to be unconstitutional.

As the Illinois Supreme Court ruling stated: "These modifications to pension benefits unquestionably diminish the value of the retirement annuities the members…were promised when they joined the pension system. Accordingly, based on the plain language of the Act, these annuity-reducing provisions contravene the pension protection clause's absolute prohibition against diminishment of pension benefits and exceed the General Assembly's authority."

=== High-speed rail ===
Nekritz is the Chair of the Midwest Interstate Passenger Rail Commission and advocates building numerous high-speed rail lines in Illinois, including one from Chicago to Detroit. See written testimony before the Rail Subcommittee of the U.S. House Transportation & Infrastructure Committee April 20, 2010 (pdf).

=== Retirement Announced ===
On June 16, 2017, Nekritz announced that she will not be seeking re-election to her position. On October 3, 2017, Nekritz was replaced by Jonathan Carroll.
