= Jason Blair (politician) =

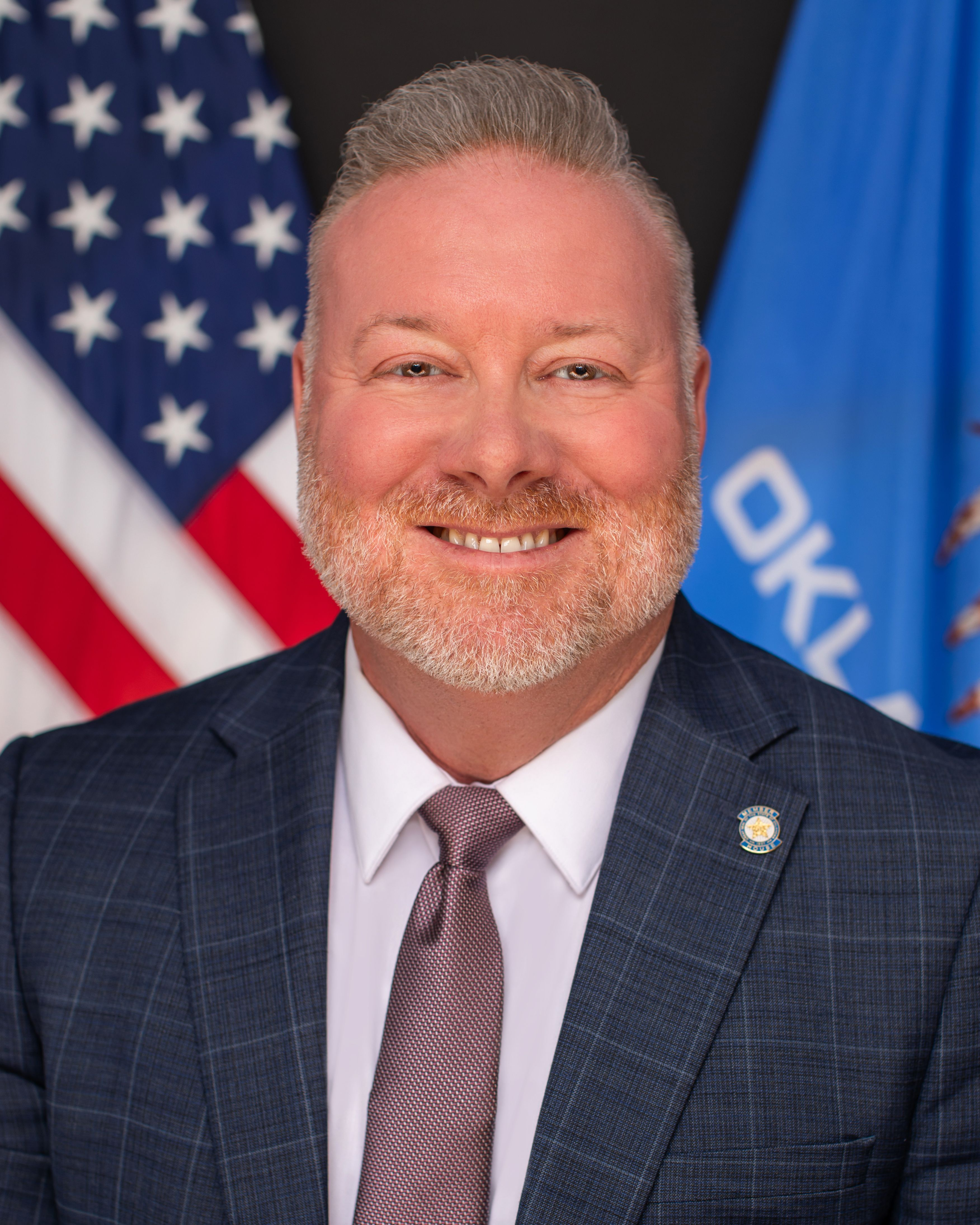
- Blair in 2024

Member of the Oklahoma House of Representatives from the 53rd district
- Incumbent
- Assumed office November 20, 2024
- Preceded by: Mark McBride

Moore City Councilor representing the 3rd ward
- In office 2014 – August 5, 2024

Personal details
- Party: Republican
- Education: University of Oklahoma

Jason Blair is an American politician who has served in the Oklahoma House of Representatives representing the 53rd district since 2024.

== Biography ==
Jason Blair is from Bridge Creek and lives in Moore. He graduated from the University of Oklahoma in 2003 and works in commercial insurance. He is active with the Moore chamber of commerce. In 2009 he was elected to the Moore City Council. He resigned on August 5, 2024.

In 2024, Blair ran to succeed Mark McBride in representing the 53rd district of the Oklahoma House of Representatives. He faced Heather Boss, Nick Pokorny, and Kathren Stehno in the Republican primary. He was endorsed by McBride and advanced to a runoff alongside Pokorny. He won the runoff with over 60% of the vote and was sworn in on November 20, 2024.
