= Tracy Katz Muhl =

Illinois legislator

Member of the Illinois House of Representatives from the 57th district
- Incumbent
- Assumed office January 11, 2024
- Preceded by: Jonathan Carroll

Personal details
- Party: Democratic
- Children: 2
- Education: Georgetown University (BS); University of Chicago (JD)
- Occupation: Illinois State Representative
- Profession: Attorney

Tracy Katz Muhl is a Democratic member of the Illinois House of Representatives for the 57th district. The 57th District includes parts of Arlington Heights, Buffalo Grove, Des Plaines, Glencoe, Glenview, Mount Prospect, Northbrook, Northfield, Riverwoods, Wheeling, Wilmette and Winnetka.

== Electoral history ==
In May 2023, Katz Muhl announced that she would be challenging State Representative Jonathan Carroll for the Democratic nomination for 57th District State Representative. Carroll later announced he would not run for reelection, resulting in Katz Muhl running unopposed in the Democratic primary election scheduled for March 19, 2024.

On January 5, 2024, Carroll submitted a resignation letter effective that evening at midnight. Pursuant to Illinois law, the Democratic Committeepersons within the 57th district held a public meeting on Thursday, January 11, 2024, and Katz Muhl utilized her 51% weighted vote to appoint herself to fill the vacancy for the remainder of the term.

Katz Muhl previously served as the Northbrook School District 28 School Board President and is currently the Democratic committeeperson of Northfield Township.

== Personal life ==
Katz Muhl lives in Northbrook with her husband and two children. She earned her undergraduate degree from Georgetown University and her J.D. from the University of Chicago Law School. She is Jewish.

Before becoming a state representative, Katz Muhl was a partner at Fox, Swibel, Levin & Carroll, LLP in Chicago.
