= Geri Palast =

American lawyer

Geri Palast is the managing director of the Israel Action Network (IAN). IAN is a joint initiative of the Jewish Federations of North America and the Jewish Council for Public Affairs to defend the legitimacy of the State of Israel, to change the conversation about Israel, and to work towards a two-state solution.

Palast is the sister of investigative journalist Greg Palast.

== Early life, education, and family ==
Palast is a graduate of Stanford University with honors, and graduated as a Root Tilden Public Service Law scholar from NYU Law School.

== Career ==
Palast has also served as the national Legislative and Political Director of Service Employees International Union (SEIU) and established and ran the Washington office of the National Employment Law Project (NELP). She has consulted with and served on numerous boards of NGOs, currently OpenSecrets and CFE. From 1993-2000, she served as the Assistant Secretary of Labor for Congressional and Intergovernmental Affairs under President Bill Clinton.

In 2000, she became the founder and executive director of two nonprofit organizations, Justice at Stake, a national judicial reform advocacy organization, and the Campaign for Fiscal Equity (CFE).

=== Israel Action Network ===
Geri Palast currently works as the Managing Director for the Israel Action Network. The IAN was created by the Jewish Federations of North America, an American Jewish umbrella organization, to "mobilize communities to counter the Assault on Israel’s Legitimacy". It is a strategic initiative that defends Israel's right to exist as a democratic Jewish state within the North American Jewish community. It advocates, "security for two states for two peoples."
