= NAACP v. Claiborne Hardware Co. =

- Supreme Court of the United States

Argued March 3, 1982 Decided July 2, 1982
- Full case name: National Association for the Advancement of Colored People v. Claiborne Hardware Co.
- Citations: 458 U.S. 886 (more) 102 S. Ct. 3409; 73 L. Ed. 2d 1215; 1982 U.S. LEXIS 49
- Argument: Oral argument

Case history
- Prior: Supreme Court of Mississippi ruled that entire boycott was unlawful, 393 So.2d 1290 (1980)

Holding
- The nonviolent elements of a boycott are entitled to the protection of the First Amendment.

Court membership
- Chief Justice Warren E. Burger Associate Justices William J. Brennan Jr. · Byron White; Thurgood Marshall · Harry Blackmun; Lewis F. Powell Jr. · William Rehnquist; John P. Stevens · Sandra Day O'Connor

Case opinions
- Majority: Stevens, joined by Burger, Brennan, White, Blackmun, Powell, O'Connor
- Concurrence: Rehnquist (in the judgment)
- Marshall took no part in the consideration or decision of the case.

Laws applied
- U.S. Const. amend. I

National Association for the Advancement of Colored People v. Claiborne Hardware Co., 458 U.S. 886 (1982), is a landmark decision of the United States Supreme Court ruling that the broad power of states to regulate economic activities does not include prohibiting peaceful advocacy of a politically motivated boycott.

== Facts ==
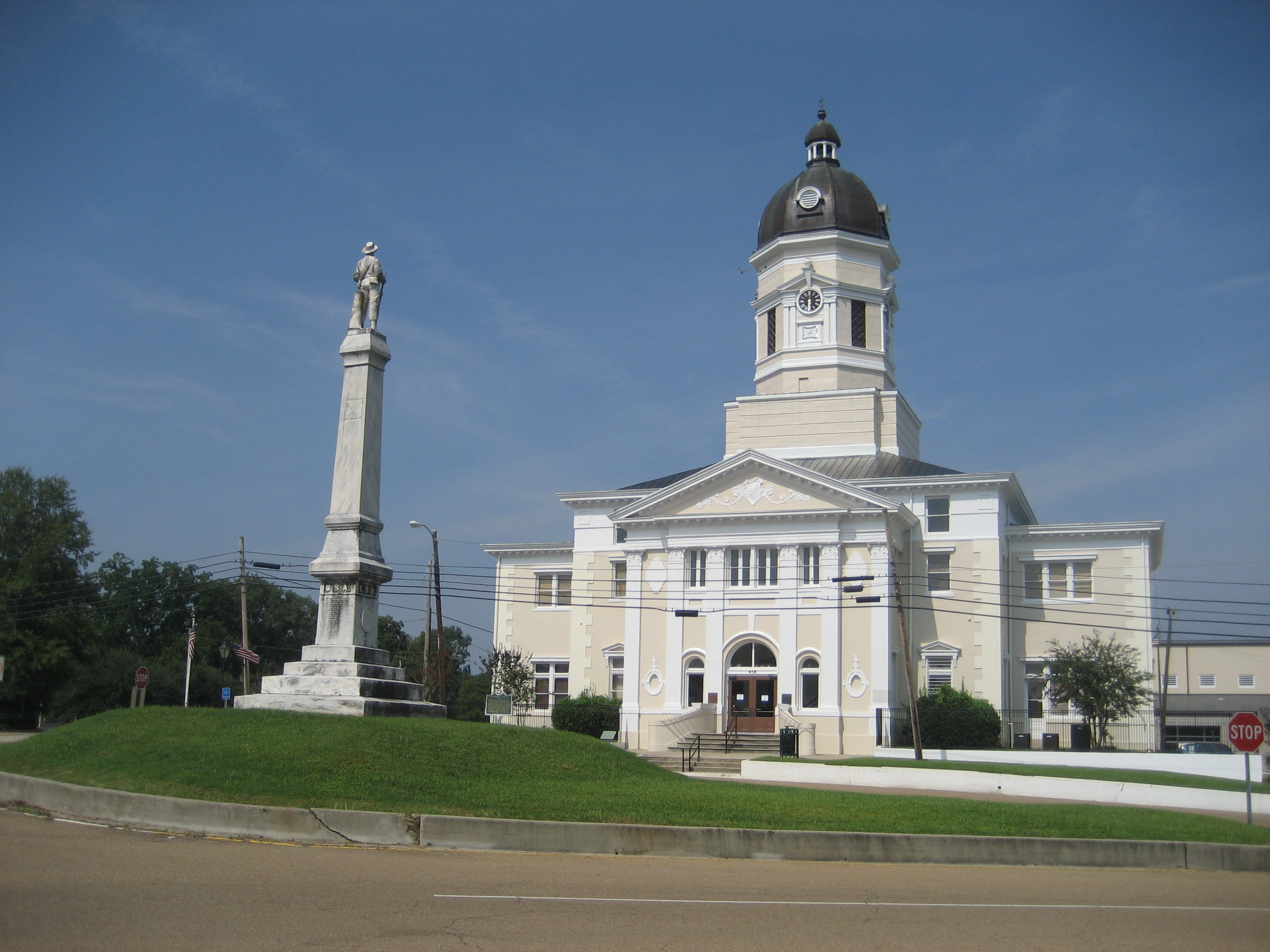
The Claiborne County courthouse at which the march took place.

In March 1966, black citizens of Port Gibson, Mississippi, and other areas of Claiborne County presented white elected officials with a list of particularized demands for racial equality and racial integration. After not receiving a satisfactory response, a local National Association for the Advancement of Colored People (NAACP) meeting at the First Baptist Church had several hundred black residents vote to place a boycott on white merchants in the area.

In February 1967, Port Gibson employed its first black police officer, and the boycott was lifted. In April 1968, during the unrest following the assassination of Martin Luther King Jr., two Port Gibson police officers shot and killed a young black man, Roosevelt Jackson. On April 19, 1968, the field secretary of the NAACP for Mississippi, Charles Evers, led a march to the Claiborne County courthouse and demanded for the entire Port Jefferson police force to be discharged. When the demand was not met, the boycott on the merchants was reimposed. On April 21, Evers made a speech in which he said, "If we catch any of you going into these racist stores, we're going to break your damn neck." During the boycott, individuals known as "Black Hats" or "Deacons" stood outside stores to identify black people who broke the boycott. The names of those who were identified were published in a black newspaper, and the names were read aloud at NAACP meetings. In at least 10 instances, individuals who violated the boycott experienced instances of violence, including shots fired into their homes, bricks thrown through their windshields, and tires on their cars slashed. Five of the incidents occurred in 1966 and were not correlated to Evers' speech, and the other five were undated and so were discarded from the court case. That resulted in the court finding no grounds for incitation of violence and noting, "For similar reasons, the judgment against Evers cannot be separately justified, nor can liability be imposed upon him on the basis of speeches that he made, because those speeches did not incite violence or specifically authorize the use of violence."

On October 31, 1969, seventeen of the merchants sued in the Chancery Court of Hinds County, 146 individuals, the NAACP, and Mississippi Action for Progress (MAP) in state court to recover losses caused by the boycott and to enjoin future boycott activity.

== Procedural history ==
A trial began in 1973 and the chancellor found in 1976 that the black defendants were jointly and severally liable to the plaintiffs based on three separate theories: for a tort of malicious interference with the plaintiff's business, for a violation of a Mississippi statute banning secondary boycotts on the theory that the defendants' primary dispute was with the governing authorities of Port Gibson and Claiborne County and not the white merchants at whom the boycott was directed, and for a violation of Mississippi's antitrust statute on the grounds that the boycott had diverted black patronage from the white merchants to black merchants and to other merchants outside Claiborne County and so had unreasonably limited competition between black and white merchants that had traditionally existed. The court rejected the defendants' defense that their actions were protected by the First Amendment.

The court held that 130 of the defendants were liable for damages to 12 merchants over an 11-year period (1966–1976) in an amount of $1,250,699 plus interest and put into place a permanent injunction enjoining the defendants from stationing "store watchers" at the merchants' business premises, from "persuading" any person to withhold his patronage from the merchants, from "using demeaning and obscene language to or about any person" because that person continued to patronize the merchants, from "picketing or patroling" the premises of any of the merchants, and from using violence against any person or inflicting damage to any real or personal property.

=== Mississippi Supreme Court ===
In December 1980, the Mississippi Supreme Court upheld the lower court's decision ruling that the boycott was unlawful. Although the court held that the secondary boycott statute was inapplicable because it had not been enacted until "the boycott had been in operation for upward of two years", and it declined to rely on the Mississippi antitrust statute by noting that the "United States Supreme Court has seen fit to hold boycotts to achieve political ends are not a violation of the Sherman Act, 15 U.S.C. § 1 (1970), after which our statute is patterned", the court upheld the imposition of liability on the basis of the chancellor's common law tort theory.

== Reversal by Supreme Court ==
On July 2, 1982, in a decision by Justice Stevens, the US Supreme Court reversed the Mississippi Supreme Court's decision and held that the nonviolent elements of the petitioners' activities were protected by the First Amendment and that the petitioners were not liable in damages for the consequences of their nonviolent protected activity. The decision means that "boycotts and related activities to bring about political, social and economic change are political speech, occupying the highest rung of the hierarchy of First Amendment values."

Justice Rehnquist concurred in the judgment only.

Justice Marshall did not take part in consideration or decision of the case.

The decision of the Supreme Court was announced the same day by Thomas I. Atkins to the 3,000 delegates who had gathered for the NAACP's 73rd national convention in Boston. A reporter for The New York Times described the outburst of emotion that the announcement created:

With that, members joyfully and tearfully transformed their meeting for a time into a cross between an emotional church service and a rowdy political convention. As delegates sang, "We shall not be moved," Mississippi members paraded through the aisles and then to the stage, holding high a signpost bearing the name of their state. Then, with a flourish, the organist played "Amazing Grace" and the auditorium grew silent.

"When you have done your best, there is a God who will do the rest," said Benjamin L. Hooks, the executive director of the association, the nation's oldest and largest civil rights organization.

== Subsequent history ==
The case was cited by the dissent in Holder v. Humanitarian Law Project (2010) in which Justice Stevens, the only remaining member of the Court from Claiborne Hardware, joined the majority. The case has also been cited as prima facie evidence of the unconstitutionality of anti-BDS laws by their opponents.
