= Alan D. Clemmons =

American politician

Member of the South Carolina House of Representatives from the 107th district
- In office 2002 – July 17, 2020
- Preceded by: Mark Kelley
- Succeeded by: Case Brittain

Personal details
- Born: December 6, 1958 (age 67) Myrtle Beach, South Carolina, U.S.
- Party: Republican
- Spouse: Laura Ann
- Children: 2
- Education: Coastal Carolina University; Hamline University (JD)
- Profession: Real Estate Attorney

Alan D. Clemmons (born December 6, 1958) is an American former member of the South Carolina House of Representatives, where he has served from 2002 until his resignation in 2020. He is a member of the Republican Party.

Clemmons was born in Myrtle Beach in 1958. From 1978 to 1980 Clemmons served as a missionary for the Church of Jesus Christ of Latter-day Saints in Southern Mexico. He is a member of The Church of Jesus Christ of Latter-day Saints. Clemmons holds a bachelor's degree from Coastal Carolina University and a JD from Hamline University. Clemmons currently practices real estate law in Myrtle Beach.

Clemmons and his wife Laura Ann are the parents of two daughters.

== Early political career ==
Clemmons was a member of the Horry County Planning Commission from 1996 to 1998. He was a delegate to the Republican National Convention in 2000 and 2008, and was an alternate in 2004. He served as vice-chairman of the Horry County Republican Party from 1995 to 1997 and served as chairman from 1997 until 2000.

== S.C. House of Representatives ==
Clemmons serves as Chairman of the House Judiciary Committee's Election Laws Subcommittee, putting him at the center on several items of note in the S.C. House of Representatives. His most significant accomplishments include writing South Carolina's Voter ID law. His work on the Voter ID law earned him the 2011 Terry Haskins Award from the South Carolina Republican Party.

In 2011 and 2012, Clemmons was also one of the chief architects of South Carolina's legislative and Congressional redistricting effort, securing the new Seventh Congressional District for the Pee Dee and Grand Strand area of South Carolina. Clemmons' position as a subcommittee chairman ensured he played a key role in working to secure federal approval for redistricting the South Carolina House and the Congressional plans.

Clemmons received the Terry Haskins Award again in 2012 for his work on issues important to the Republican Party Platform as well as for his work on the redistricting process.

Clemmons has also taken the lead in South Carolina on pro-Israel issues.

From 2004 until 2008, Clemmons served as Secretary-Treasurer of the S.C. House Republican Caucus. He was term-limited from seeking additional years in the position.

He has also been a staunch voice in the S.C. General Assembly in favor of extending Interstate 73 to Myrtle Beach. He served as Chairman for the South Carolina I-73 Association from 2003 to 2007 and currently serves as Board Chairman of the National I-73/I-74/I-75 Association.

Rep. Clemmons has served as Chairman for the House Rules Committee since 2011. He is also a member of the House Judiciary Committee, in which he served as 2nd Vice Chairman from 2004 to 2006.

Among other pieces of legislation, Clemmons was the sponsor of the Rider Safety Act which emphasizes the responsibility of individuals to act responsibly on amusement park rides.

In April 2014, Clemmons introduced a bill to the House of Representatives that could pave the way for a large brewing company to construct a new brewery location in Myrtle Beach. Current legislation limits the amount barrels a beer produced per year to 2,000 to brewpubs that wish to produce beer and sell it in the same location. The bill, if passed, would allow a brewpub in South Carolina to produce up to 500,000 barrels of beer a year and still sell the beer at the brewing site.

Clemmons received the following recognitions for his legislative and community service: South Carolina Hero, 2008, by the American Association of Retired Persons (AARP); Legislator of the Year, 2006, by the South Carolina Association of Realtors; Legislator of the Year, 2005, by the Association of Drug Stores; Special Legislative Commendation, 2004, by the South Carolina Silver Haired Legislature; and Distinguished Alumnus of the Year, 2004, by Coastal Carolina University.

Clemmons entered the national spotlight during a case challenging whether a South Carolina Voter ID law he worked on while in the House of Representatives violated the 1965 Voting Rights Act. During testimony in the proceeding, Clemmons stated that he responded to an e-mail from a man named Ed Koziol saying, "Amen, Ed, thank you for your support." A portion of the email from Kozoil stated that if the legislature offered a reward for identification cards, "it would be like a swarm of bees going after a watermelon."

=== Views on Israel and the BDS movement ===
Clemmons denies that Israel has a military occupation of the West Bank, and refers to such descriptions as "the lie of occupation," writing "To suggest that the Jews are occupiers in a region that has been known as Judea for over 3000-plus years is no less ridiculous than to suggest that Arabs are occupiers in Arabia."

In 2011, Clemmons wrote a pro-Israel resolution drawing inspiration from Bible verses:

Whereas, Israel has been granted her lands under and through the oldest recorded deed as reported in the Old Testament, a tome of scripture held sacred and reverenced by Jew and Christian, alike, as the acts and words of God; and

Whereas, as the Grantor of said lands, God stated to the Jewish people in the Old Testament; in Leviticus, Chapter 20, Verse 24: "Ye shall inherit their land, and I will give it unto you to possess it, a land that floweth with milk and honey"; and

Whereas, God has never rescinded his grant of said lands; and ...

Be it resolved by the House of Representatives:

That the members of the South Carolina House of Representatives, by this resolution, commend the nation of Israel for its relations with the United States of America and with the State of South Carolina.

The resolution received positive response from both Democratic and Republican legislature members in South Carolina. Israeli lawmakers, who had heard about the South Carolina resolution, invited Clemmons to speak at the Knesset’s inaugural meeting of the caucus against antisemitism. In 2014, Clemmons led a group of South Carolina legislators to Israel on an economic development visit for marrying venture capital with new technologies. In 2015, in response to the Boycott, Divestment, and Sanctions (BDS) movement, Clemmons sponsored an anti-BDS law which prohibited public entities from doing businesses with companies that boycotts Israel. The bill passed with strong bipartisan support.

More controversially, in March, 2017 while speaking at a United Nations gathering opposed to the BDS campaign, Clemmons accused J Street, a pro-Israel PAC, of being anti-Semitic due to their positions on the West Bank and Gaza Strip (collectively, the State of Palestine). This charge was rejected by Jewish groups spanning the political spectrum right to left.
