= Jonathan Carroll (politician) =

American politician

Member of the Illinois House of Representatives from the 57th district
- In office October 3, 2017 – January 5, 2024
- Preceded by: Elaine Nekritz
- Succeeded by: Tracy Katz Muhl

Personal details
- Party: Democratic
- Education: DePaul University (BA); Northeastern Illinois University (MA)
- Profession: Cognitive Disabilities Specialist; Special Education Teacher

Jonathan Carroll is a former Democratic member of the Illinois House of Representatives from the 57th district. The 57th district, located in the Chicago metropolitan area, includes all or parts of Arlington Heights, Buffalo Grove, Des Plaines, Glenview, Mount Prospect, Northbrook, Palatine, Prospect Heights and Wheeling.

== Early life and career ==
Prior to serving in the General Assembly, Carroll was a special education teacher and currently works in private practice helping individuals with cognitive challenges like ADHD. Carroll has a degree in communications from DePaul University, and an M.A. in special education from Northeastern Illinois University. He is a certified special education teacher and has managed the private Carroll Educational Group for several years, helping clients with special needs. He is a director of the Portes Foundation, which makes grants for medical and life sciences research.

== Illinois House of Representatives ==
On October 2, 2017, Democratic incumbent Elaine Nekritz resigned from the Illinois House of Representatives. The Democratic Representative Committee for the 57th Representative District selected Jonathan Carroll to fill the vacancy. Carroll was sworn into office on October 3, 2017. Upon being sworn in, he replaced Nekritz on the Committee on Government Consolidation & Modernization and the Committee on Cybersecurity, Data Analytics & Information Technology. He was also assigned to the Committee on Mass Transit; and the Committee on Elementary & Secondary Education Committee.

In 2019, Carroll authored a food-labeling law benefiting people with food allergies. In 2020, Carroll authored legislation outlawing schools' use of isolation rooms as a disciplinary tactic. In December 2021 during the COVID-19 pandemic, the representative introduced legislation mandating that individuals who remained willfully unvaccinated against COVID-19 (excluding those with medical reasons preventing vaccination) should pay out of pocket the entirety of any hospital expenses resulting from infection and subsequent treatment.

On January 5, 2024, Carroll announced his resignation at the conclusion of the day.

=== Committee assignments ===
As of July 3, 2022, Representative Carroll is a member of the following Illinois House Committees:

- (Chairman of) Consumer Protection Committee (HCON)
- Counties & Townships Committee (HCOT)
- Executive Committee (HEXC)
- Family Law & Probate Subcommittee (HJUA-FLAW)
- Financial Protection Subcommittee (HCON-FINA)
- Insurance Committee (HINS)
- International Trade & Commerce Committee (HITC)
- Judiciary - Civil Committee (HJUA)
- Product Safety Subcommittee (HCON-PROD)
- Public Utilities Committee (HPUB)

== Electoral history ==
=== 2018 ===
In 2018, Carroll won the Democratic nomination and Mary Battinus won the Republican nomination for the 57th district. Battinus dropped out of the election two months after the primary. The Republican Party did not nominate a replacement candidate and Carroll ran unopposed.

Illinois 57th Representative District General Election, 2018
Party	Candidate	Votes	%
Democratic	Jonathan Carroll (incumbent)	24,446	100.0
Total votes		24,446	100.0

=== 2020 ===
In the 2020 election, Carroll was the only candidate to file to run in the primary election or general election.

Illinois 57th Representative District General Election, 2020
Party	Candidate	Votes	%
Democratic	Jonathan Carroll (incumbent)	32,397	100.0
Total votes		32,397	100.0

=== 2022 ===
In 2022, Carroll won the Democratic nomination and Rory Welch won the Republican nomination for the 57th district. In the general election, Carroll defeated Welch with 22,553 votes (63.63%) to Welch's 12,889 votes (36.37%).

Illinois 57th State House District General Election, 2022
Party	Candidate	Votes	%
Democratic	Jonathan Carroll (incumbent)	22,553	63.63
Republican	Rory Welch	12,889	36.37
Total votes		35,442	100.00

=== 2024 ===
On July 3, 2023, facing a primary challenge from Tracy Katz Muhl, Carroll announced that he had decided not to run for reelection in 2024. Following Carroll's resignation, Katz Muhl was appointed to serve out the remainder of the term.
