= Academic boycott of Israel =

Boycott of Israeli universities and academics

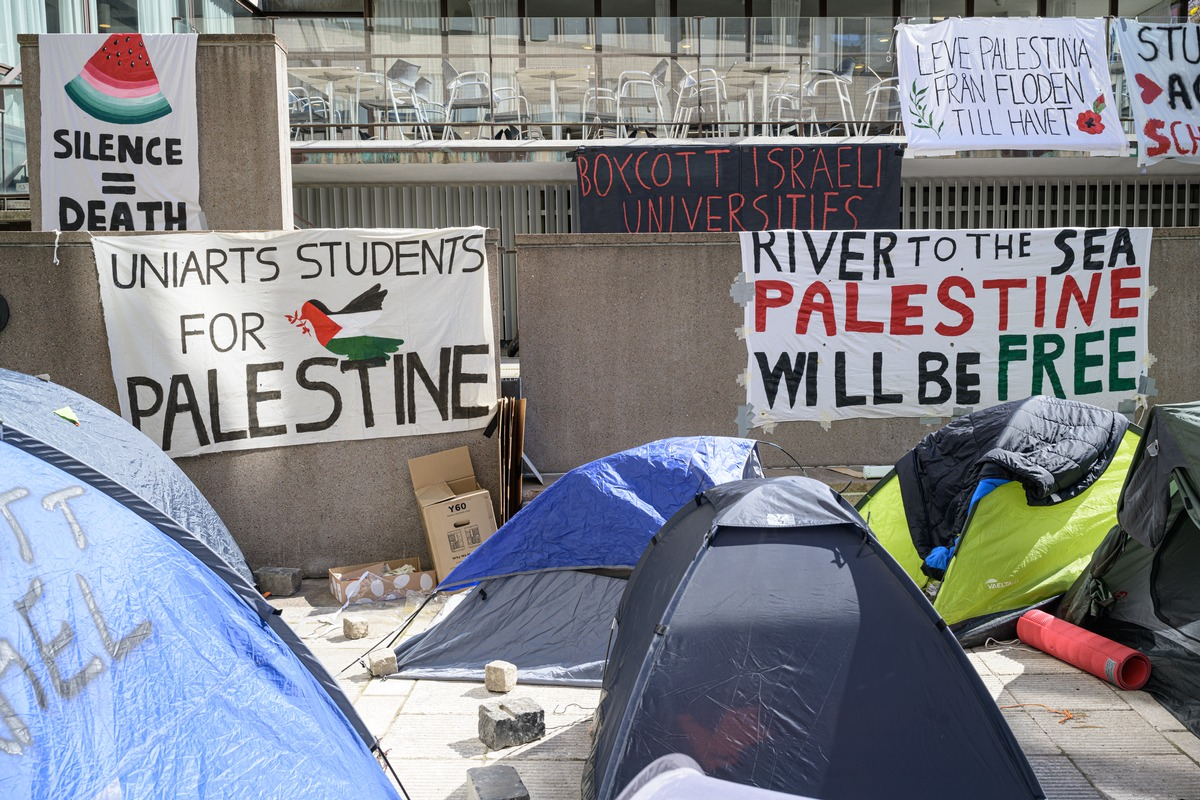
Demonstration at the University of Helsinki calling for a boycott of Israeli universities, May 11, 2024.

In April 2004, the Palestinian Campaign for the Academic and Cultural Boycott of Israel (PACBI) launched a campaign for an academic boycott of Israel as part of the Boycott, Divestment and Sanctions (BDS) campaign. PACBI argues that Israeli academic institutions are complicit in perpetuating the Israeli occupation and therefore should be subject to boycott in order to advance BDS goals. Since then, proposals for academic boycotts of particular Israeli universities and academics have been made by academics and organizations in Palestine, the United States, the United Kingdom, and other countries. Supporters say the boycotts is intended to pressure Israel to change policies they describe are discriminatory towards the Palestinians.

The campaigns for academic boycott of Israel have led to fierce debate. Opponents argue that boycott advocates apply different standards to Israel than other countries, that the boycott is counterproductive, a collective punishment of Israeli academia, a tactic to threaten the existence of the State of Israel, and also that the campaign is antisemitic. Support for academic boycotts of Israel has been more prevalent among faculty in the humanities and social sciences than in the sciences. Despite this debate, academic boycott measures have been undertaken around the world, with some support among academic associations and unions, but with little institutional success.

== Worldwide ==
In October 2014, 500 anthropologists endorsed an academic boycott of Israeli institutions seen as complicit in violations of Palestinians' rights. The signatories of the statement said, "as a community of scholars who study problems of power, oppression, and cultural hegemony, we have a moral responsibility to speak out and demand accountability from Israel and our own governments." Also in October 2014, 500 Middle East studies scholars and librarians issued a call for an academic boycott of Israel. According to the signatories, "world governments and mainstream media do not hold Israel accountable for its violations of international law. We, however, as a community of scholars engaged with the Middle East, have a moral responsibility to do so." In Germany, the Bundestag’s 2019 resolution labelling the BDS campaign as antisemitic, though not legally binding, has had political and financial effects, with some associations losing public funding.

Following the Gaza war a number of universities have canceled or suspended collaborations with Israeli institutions. In 2024, the Federal University of Ceará in Brazil canceled an innovation summit with an Israeli university. A number of universities in Norway, Belgium, and Spain have also severed ties with Israeli institutions in 2025. The European Association of Social Anthropologists has announced that it will not collaborate with Israeli academic institutions and has encouraged its members to follow suit. The student exchange program with the Hebrew University of Jerusalem has also been terminated by the University of Amsterdam.

Reports published after the 2025 Gaza ceasefire indicate that academic restrictions and institutional distancing from Israeli universities have continued in several countries, with some universities and scholarly associations maintaining or expanding earlier suspensions of cooperation despite the reduction in active hostilities. Recent reports from 2025 and 2026 indicate an increase in academic boycott initiatives and related institutional measures involving Israeli universities across Europe and other Western countries. In 2025, a statement by the International Center for Urbanism (ICfU) at KU Leuven called for a full academic boycott of Israeli institutions, urging the suspension of future institutional collaborations and increased academic cooperation with Palestinian universities.

A 2026 report by the Association of University Heads in Israel (VERA) stated that efforts to exclude Israeli universities from international research frameworks had increased, including a reported 150 percent rise in attempts to remove Israel from the European Union’s Horizon Europe research program, with several such initiatives concentrated in European countries such as Belgium and the Netherlands. Another 2026 report by the Samuel Neaman Institute noted continued growth in BDS-related academic boycott activity since October 2023, including protests, boycott initiatives, and discussions within academic institutions, as well as signs of gradual institutionalization of such initiatives in parts of Europe and other Western countries.

In April 2026, pro-Palestinian activists occupied a Ghent University campus in Belgium, calling for a full academic boycott and the termination of remaining institutional collaborations with Israeli universities.

== United Kingdom ==
In reaction to the National Executive Council of the National Union of Students' BDS resolution on 2 June 2015, Prof. Leslie Wagner argued, "In reality, co-operation between Israeli and British universities and their academics has grown in recent years under the energetic leadership of outgoing UK ambassador to Israel, Matthew Gould."

=== The Guardian open letter, 2002 ===
The idea of an academic boycott against Israel first emerged publicly in England on 6 April 2002 in an open letter to The Guardian initiated by Steven and Hilary Rose, professors in biology at the Open University and social policy at the University of Bradford respectively, who called for a moratorium on all cultural and research links with Israel. It read:

Despite widespread international condemnation for its policy of violent repression against the Palestinian people in the Occupied Territories, the Israeli government appears impervious to moral appeals from world leaders. ... Odd though it may appear, many national and European cultural and research institutions, including especially those funded from the EU and the European Science Foundation, regard Israel as a European state for the purposes of awarding grants and contracts. ... Would it not therefore be timely if at both national and European level a moratorium was called upon any further such support unless and until Israel abide by UN resolutions and open serious peace negotiations with the Palestinians, along the lines proposed in many peace plans including most recently that sponsored by the Saudis and the Arab League.

By July 2002, the open letter had gained over 700 signatories, including those of ten Israeli academics.

In response to the open letter, Leonid Ryzhik, a senior professor in mathematics at the University of Chicago, led a rival web-based petition that condemned the original's "unjustly righteous tone" and warned that the boycott has a "broader risk of very disruptive repercussions for a wide range of international scientific and cultural contacts." The counter petition had gathered almost 1,000 signatories.

=== Mona Baker, Miriam Shlesinger and Gideon Toury ===
In early June 2002, Mona Baker, a professor of translation studies at the University of Manchester in England and a signatory of the 2002 open letter, removed two Israeli academics – Dr. Miriam Shlesinger of Bar-Ilan University which at the time had a regional branch in the Ariel settlement, a former chair of Amnesty International, Israel; and Professor Gideon Toury of Tel Aviv University – from the editorial boards of the journals Translator and Translation Studies Abstracts. Subsequently, Baker said that Translator will no longer publish any research by Israeli scholars and will refuse to sell books and journals to Israeli libraries.

=== Association of University Teachers ===
On 22 April 2005, the Council of Association of University Teachers (AUT) voted to boycott two Israeli universities: University of Haifa and Bar-Ilan University. The motions to AUT Council were prompted by the call for a boycott from nearly 60 Palestinian academics and others. The AUT Council voted to boycott Bar-Ilan because it runs courses at colleges in the West Bank (referring to Ariel College) and "is thus directly involved with the occupation of Palestinian territories contrary to United Nations resolutions". It boycotted Haifa because it was alleged that the university had wrongly disciplined Ilan Pappé for supporting a student who wrote about attacks on Palestinians during the founding of the state of Israel. The University denied having disciplined the lecturer. Union members claimed that staff and students [of Israeli universities] who seek to research Israel's history in full are often "victimised".

The AUT's decision was immediately condemned by Jewish groups and many members of the AUT. Critics of the boycott within and outside the AUT noted that at the meeting at which the boycott motion was passed the leadership cut short the debate citing a lack of time. Specifically, the Board of Deputies of British Jews and the Union of Jewish Students accused the AUT of purposely holding the vote during Passover, when many Jewish members could not be present.

The presidents of Jerusalem-based al-Quds University and Hebrew University of Jerusalem issued a joint statement condemning the boycott effort as unproductive towards ending the "shared tragedy" but rather could prolong it:

Bridging political gulfs – rather than widening them further apart – between nations and individuals thus becomes an educational duty as well as a functional necessity, requiring exchange and dialogue rather than confrontation and antagonism. Our disaffection with, and condemnation of acts of academic boycotts and discrimination against scholars and institutions, is predicated on the principles of academic freedom, human rights, and equality between nations and among individuals.

One of the university presidents, Sari Nusseibeh of al-Quds University, continued: "If we are to look at Israeli society, it is within the academic community that we've had the most progressive pro-peace views and views that have come out in favor of seeing us as equals [...] If you want to punish any sector, this is the last one to approach." He acknowledges, however, that his view is a minority one among Palestinian academics.

Zvi Ravner, Israel's deputy ambassador in London, noted, "[t]he last time that Jews were boycotted in universities was in 1930s Germany."

The British National Postgraduate Committee also voted to oppose the boycott. Project officer Andre Oboler said that the boycott "runs contrary to our objective, which is to advance in the public interest the education of postgraduate students within the UK".

In May 2005, the AUT voted to rescind its boycott of two Israeli universities. The reversal followed internal and external criticism that the boycott undermined academic freedom and peace efforts.

=== National Association of Teachers in Further and Higher Education ===
In May 2006, National Association of Teachers in Further and Higher Education (NATFHE) passed a motion urging members to boycott Israeli academics who did not vocally speak out against their government. The resolution was dismissed by the AUT, with which NATFHE soon merged, and subsequent boycott proposals at later union conferences were opposed by university leadership and did not advance beyond statements.

==== Criticism of the NATFHE ====
A group of eight Nobel laureates denounced the policy before it was passed, suggesting that it would limit academic freedom.

Brian Klug made this criticism of the NATFHE motion:

[E]ven if the policy and rationale were clear and unambiguous, there is a deeper problem with motions of this sort that prevents them from attracting a broad base of support: they rely on the false (or limited) analogy implied by the word "apartheid". This is not to say that there are no points of comparison, for there are – just as there are in a host of other countries where minority ethnic and national groups are oppressed. Nor is it even to say that the suffering experienced by Palestinians is less than that endured by "non-whites" in South Africa: it may or may not be (although I am not sure how to do the sums). But as I have argued elsewhere: "The validity of the analogy does not depend on a catalogue of atrocities, however appalling."

The Association of Jewish Sixthformers (AJ6) issued a press release expressing dismay and concern "about the affects [sic] of any boycott on Jewish and Israeli Sixthformers". Specifically, AJ6 pointed to "partnerships and exchange visits with Israeli schools and colleges may be under threat", and "Jewish students who study in Israel during their Gap Years are worried that teachers may refuse to provide them with references for these programmes."

The Anti-Defamation League issued a statement which condemned the motion explaining:

It is profoundly unjust for academics in the only democratic country in the Middle East – the only country where scholarship and debate are permitted to freely flourish – to be held to an ideological test and the threat of being blacklisted because of their views. No one would expect a British or American professor to have to withstand such scrutiny of their political views. Yet, when it comes to Israel a different standard applies.

The British government, through Foreign and Commonwealth Office Minister Lord Triesman, issued a statement that the motion was "counterproductive and retrograde" although the British Government recognized "the independence of the NATFHE".

==== Response to criticism ====
Paul Mackney, the general secretary of NATFHE and who opposed the motion as passed, is quoted after the fact by The Guardian:

The ironic thing, is if we had put this to delegates a couple of weeks ago, before the international pro-Israeli lobby started this massive campaign emailing delegates and trying to deny us our democratic right to discuss whatever we like, it probably wouldn't have passed. People feel bullied, and what we have seen is a hardening of attitudes. All they achieved was making the delegates determined to debate and pass the motion.

Tamara Traubmann and Benjamin Joffe-Walt, reporting for The Guardian, conducted an analysis of "whether the campaigns against such boycotts are actually motivated by concerns for academic freedom, or whether they are using the universalist ideal to stifle critical discussion of Israel". They describe their findings this way:

Through discussions with anti-boycott campaigners and a trace of the most common emails (not necessarily abusive) sent to the union and handed over by Natfhe, we found the vast majority of the tens of thousands of emails originated not with groups fighting for academic freedom, but with lobby groups and thinktanks that regularly work to delegitimise criticisms of Israel.

=== University and College Union ===
Since 2007, the UCU has been controversially involved in the academic boycotts of Israel and for rejecting the previously accepted definition of antisemitism. Some members resigned following claims of an underlying institutional antisemitism. In 2010, the UCU passed a boycott motion that invoked a "call from the Palestinian Boycott National Committee" for "an isolation of Israel while it continues to act in breach of international law" and calls to "campaign actively" against Israel's trade agreement with the European Union. Dr John Chalcraft, of the London School of Economics, said: "A boycott will be effective because Israel considers itself part of the West: when Western civil society finally says 'enough is enough', Israelis, not to mention Western governments, will take notice. A non-violent international boycott, like that of South Africa, may well play a historic role in bringing down the Israeli system of apartheid."

Susan Fuhrman, President of Teachers College, Columbia University said:

"As the president of an academic institution dedicated in large part to the preparation of teachers, I believe that universities and all centers of learning must be allowed to function as safe havens for freedom of discussion, debate and intellectual inquiry, standing apart from national and international politics and partisan strife. Only thus can they continue to produce scholarship that informs the policies and laws of democratic societies and stand as islands of hope in a frequently polarized world. ... Teachers College welcomes dialogue with Israeli scholars and universities and stands with Columbia University President Lee Bollinger in expressing solidarity with them by inviting UCU to boycott us, as well."

In 2011, Jewish UCU member and chair of the Academic Friends of Israel, Ronnie Fraser, sued the union for breach of the Equality Act 2010 with the Employment Tribunal. In March 2013, the complaint was rejected in its entirety with the judgement describing it as "an impermissible attempt to achieve a political end by litigious means."

== France ==
=== During the Second Intifada ===
In April 2002, during the Al-Aqsa Intifada, around the time of the publication of the open letter in The Guardian, the Coordination des Scientifiques pour une Paix Juste au Proche-Orient, a group of French academics, published a call for a boycott of Israeli scientific institutions on the web. The statement was published in French and English and stressed that only "official Israeli institutions, including universities" were targeted, and that signatories "will continue to collaborate with, and host, Israeli scientific colleagues on an individual basis." The pledge was signed by several hundred academics from 30 countries. During the subsequent months it was the subject of discussion in the French press and in scientific journals.

In December of the same year, a motion put forward at the Administrative Council of the Université Paris 6 called for the suspension of the EU-Israel association agreement, referring to discrimination against Palestinian colleagues and to Article of this agreement, which states that "[r]elations between the Parties, as well as all the provisions of the Agreement itself, shall be based on respect for human rights and democratic principles, which guides their internal and international policy and constitutes an essential element of this Agreement." Far from calling for a boycott, the motion called on the President of the university to establish contact with Israeli and Palestinian university authorities in order to work for peace. The motion was adopted on 16 December 2002 by 22 in favor, 4 opposed, and 6 abstentions.

An opposing motion was proposed and adopted on 27 January 2003 by members of the Council. It stated that it "recognized the emotions stirred up by the motion adopted on December 16, 2002, and by the way it was interpreted" and affirmed "its opposition to any moratorium or boycott in the relations between universities and university faculty; asked that, in the context of the preparation of the EU's Sixth Framework Program, the association agreement between the EU and Israel be renegotiated to include the Palestinians … and called on the EU to ensure compliance by all parties with all clauses of the agreement (…)".

=== Following Operation Cast Lead ===
In March 2009, shortly after the Gaza War, a call for an academic boycott in France was published on the web with over 50 signatures, including Daniel Bensaïd, Gérard Toulouse of the Académie des sciences, coauthor in 2003 of Les scientifiques et les droits de l'homme with Lydie Koch-Miramond who had also signed and defended the boycott of Israel in 2002, Mireille Fanon-Mendès-France, and Roland Lombard, President of the Collectif Interuniversitaire pour la Coopération avec les Universités Palestiniennes. They called "in the first place to impose a program of boycott, divestment, and sanctions," following the creation of the French organization BDS France.

In the spring of 2009, the Association of Academics for the Respect of International Law in Palestine (AURDIP) was created by the group of academics who had initiated the 2002 call, in alliance with the Palestinian Campaign for the Academic and Cultural Boycott of Israel PACBI and with the British organization British Committee for the Universities of Palestine. AURDIP was created with two primary missions: (1) To promote the application of international law in Israel and Palestine; specifically to oppose Israeli occupation of the Palestinian territories and Israel’s settlement policy, which fly in the face of international conventions on human rights, United Nations resolutions, and decisions of the International Court of Justice; (2) To defend Palestinians’ right to education and to support students and staff of Palestinian universities in the defense of this right.

== United States ==
=== Boycott campaign ===
Haaretz reported in 2009 that a group of American professors had joined the boycott call in the wake of the 2008–2009 Israel–Gaza conflict:

While Israeli academics have grown used to such news from Great Britain, where anti-Israel groups several times attempted to establish academic boycotts, the formation of the United States movement marks the first time that a national academic boycott movement has come out of America.

The group's name is "U.S. Campaign for the Academic & Cultural Boycott of Israel". (USACBI)

=== Support and successes ===
==== Associations ====
In April 2013, the Association for Asian American Studies (AAAS) voted to boycott Israeli universities and academic institutions. It was joined in December by the American Studies Association (ASA). In a vote in which 1,252 of its 5,000 members participated, 66% voted in favour of a boycott. The reasons given were "Israel's violation of international law and UN resolutions; the documented impact of the Israeli occupation on Palestinian scholars and students; [and] the extent to which Israeli institutions of higher education are a party to state policies that violate human rights," and thus "negatively impact the working conditions of Palestinian scholars and students". Many proponents of the ASA's boycott, including Yale professor and past president of the ASA Matthew Frye Jacobson, argue that the action can be seen as "symbolic", as it is such defined by the ASA council statement. In response to the resolution, a number of organizations and politicians accused the ASA of applying a double standard towards Israel. Opponents of the boycott called the resolution antisemitic and anti-Israel.

Israel is the only nation ever boycotted by the ASA in the 52 years of the organization's existence. The New York Times reported that ASA's president Curtis Marez argued that America has "a particular responsibility to answer the call for boycott because it is the largest supplier of military aid to the state of Israel". Marez acknowledged that the United States has previously, and is currently, the largest supplier of military aid to many governments, including some with poor human rights records, but explained that Israel is the only country in which "civil society groups" had specifically asked the ASA to launch a boycott. Further responding to accusations that the ASA was singling out Israel while ignoring many other nations that have comparable or even worse human rights records that Israel (including many of Israel's neighbors), Marez replied: "One has to start somewhere."

Over 700 new members joined the organisation between the December vote to boycott Israeli academic institutions and April 2014. The ASA subsequently released a statement that said it had "collected more membership revenue in the past three months than in any other three-month period over the past quarter-century" and that their organization is "thriving".

In December 2013, the council of the Native American and Indigenous Studies Association voted unanimously in favor of the academic boycott of Israel, becoming the third American academic association to participate in PACBI's Call to action. NAISA made an official declaration of its support for the academic boycott of Israel, choosing to create an original document of declaration in order to protest, "the infringement of the academic freedom of Indigenous Palestinian academics and intellectuals in the Occupied Territories and Israel who are denied fundamental freedoms of movement, expression, and assembly, which [it] uphold[s]." The declaration "encourages NAISA members to boycott Israeli academic institutions because they are imbricated with the Israeli state".

In November 2015, the annual business meeting of the American Anthropological Association voted to join the academic boycott campaign, by a margin of 1,040 to 136. In 2016 the resolution was put up for vote by all the members of the Association and was rejected. In July 2023, the American Anthropological Association again voted on the resolution and it passed.

In March 2022, the Middle East Studies Association voted to endorse BDS, by a margin of 768 to 167. A full membership vote was taken from 31 January to 22 March, and 80 per cent of members voted in favor of a proposed resolution endorsing the Palestinian call for boycotts, divestment, and sanctions of Israel.

==== Academics ====
In a speech given at Brooklyn College in 2013 with BDS founding member Omar Barghouti, prominent American academic Judith Butler commented on the reasons behind her support of the academic boycott campaign of the BDS movement stating:

Others may interpret the boycott differently, but I have no problem collaborating with Israeli scholars and artists as long as we do not participate in any Israeli institution or have Israeli state monies support our collaborative work. The reason, of course, is that the academic and cultural boycott seeks to put pressure on all those cultural institutions that have failed to oppose the occupation and struggle for equal rights and the rights of the dispossessed, all those cultural institutions that think it is not their place to criticize their government for these practices, all of them that understand themselves to be above or beyond this intractable political condition.

Hamid Dabashi, a professor of Iranian studies at Columbia University, is on the advisory board of the U.S. Campaign for the Academic & Cultural Boycott of Israel. Dabashi supports boycott efforts targeting both Israeli individuals and institutions:

The divestment campaign that has been far more successful in Western Europe needs to be reinvigorated in North America – as must the boycotting of the Israeli cultural and academic institutions ... Naming names and denouncing individually every prominent Israeli intellectual who has publicly endorsed their elected officials' wide-eyed barbarism, and then categorically boycotting their universities and colleges, film festivals and cultural institutions, is the single most important act of solidarity that their counterparts can do around the world.

Other American academics that have advocated for boycotts against Israel include Andrew Ross and Simona Sawhney.

==== Other groups ====
The Columbia Palestine Forum (CPF), which was formed at Columbia University in March 2009, maintains that Israel is an apartheid state and advocates boycott and divestment efforts against Israel. The group has called for increased disclosure of university finances to establish that Columbia funds are not being used towards "maintenance of the Israeli occupation and human rights abuses in Gaza and the West Bank", and advocates divestment of university funds from any companies that profit from what it describes as the "continued occupation of Palestinian lands, the maintenance of illegal Israeli settlements and the walls being built around Gaza, the West Bank and Jerusalem".

CPF outlined its demands to a university representative during a demonstration on 5 March 2009. On the previous day, it held a panel discussion featuring multiple Columbia faculty members who have been supportive of the group. Gil Anidjar, a religion professor, advocated boycott as an appropriate "exercise of freedom", while anthropology professor Brinkley Messick indicated that Columbia President Lee Bollinger had agreed to meet with the faculty to discuss the demands for divestment. One CPF member described the group's goals in a 3 March article for Columbia's newspaper, stating, "by divesting from companies that do business with the occupation, we can put global pressure on the Israeli government to end it."

=== Opposition and criticism of academic boycotts within the U.S. ===
University of Pennsylvania President Amy Gutmann said in January 2012 that the university "has clearly stated on numerous occasions that it does not support sanctions or boycotts against Israel". She said that the school was not a sponsor of a BDS conference taking place on campus in February 2012.

In March 2009, the American Federation of Teachers (AFT) reiterated its opposition to any academic boycott of Israel (or any other country) but added that discussion of the Israel-Palestinian conflict should be encouraged. AFT President Randi Weingarten stated that:

We believe academic boycotts were a bad idea in 2002 and are a bad idea now. Academic boycotts are inconsistent with the democratic values of academic freedom and free expression... We want to make clear that this position does not in any way discourage an open discussion and debate of the Israeli-Palestinian conflict or of ways to resolve it. However, we expect that such a discussion would not be one-sided and would consider the behavior of all the relevant actors. An academic boycott of Israel, or of any country, for that matter, would effectively suppress free speech without helping to resolve the conflict.

The Forward published, in January 2012, an article about Jewish presidents of universities, saying, "many college presidents" see BDS as a "red line" and "presidents who were previously disinclined to speak out against anti-Israel activity on campus in the name of preserving open dialogue found themselves publicly opposing the movement."

After fierce debate, the American Anthropological Association (AAA) chose not to endorse any academic boycott of Israel in 2016. Anthropologist David M. Rosen studied the effects of the Boycott, Divestment, and Sanctions (BDS) movement on the association. Rosen's conclusion was:

"Had the association joined the BDS boycott, it would have established ... an ideological litmus test for participation in the academy. Endorsing a political test for speech is a step on a dangerous path for American anthropologists. As University of Chicago president Robert Zimmer put it, boycotts are an 'assault on the fundamental principles of open discourse ... and free argumentation, principles that lie at the very foundation of the academy and its missions of discovery ... and education.' ... [A]n academic boycott opens the door to the general political suppression of speech in the academy. ... [I]f academics no longer uphold the principle of free speech in the university, neither will anyone else."

==== Criticism of the ASA ====
Until April 2013, no American school had ever divested from or imposed an academic boycott on Israel despite strong boycott campaigns. Former President of Harvard University Larry Summers has called Israel-boycott efforts "anti-Semitic in their effect if not their intent". In 2007, nearly 300 university presidents across the United States signed a joint statement denouncing the boycott movement. In 2010, a group of 15 American university professors launched a campaign calling for an academic and cultural boycott of Israel.

Many universities and prominent scholars criticized the ASA's support of the boycott. Brandeis University, Pennsylvania State University, Indiana University and Kenyon College decided to withdraw from the ASA. The American Council on Education, an umbrella organisation of 1,800 institutions, the American Association of Universities which represents 62 schools across the US and Canada, and the American Association of University Professors all condemned the boycott.

Ninety-two university presidents including of Harvard, Brown, Yale, Princeton, Johns Hopkins, Cornell, Duke, Stanford, Boston, Columbia, Chicago, New York University, Dartmouth College, Wesleyan, Florida, University of Miami, Western Kentucky University, University of Connecticut and University of Washington, condemned the boycott and distanced themselves from the ASA.

Harvard president Drew Gilpin Faust said, "academic boycotts subvert the academic freedoms and values necessary to the free flow of ideas," and that a boycott was "a direct threat to these ideals". Former Harvard president Lawrence H. Summers stated that Israel was being unfairly singled out when other countries' human rights records were far worse. The president of Kenyon College dismissed it as a "geopolitical tool", endorsing the decision of its American Studies program to secede as an institutional member of the ASA. The president of Wesleyan University deplored this "politically retrograde resolution", describing it as an irresponsible attack under the guise of phony progressivism.

Ronald S. Lauder, president of the World Jewish Congress, argued that the boycott demonstrated "the Orwellian antisemitism and moral bankruptcy of the ASA" while the ADL described the boycott as "shameful, morally bankrupt and intellectually dishonest attack on academic freedom".

In January 2014, 134 members of Congress (69 Democrats, 65 Republicans) signed a letter to ASA president Curtis Marez and president-elect Lisa Duggan, which accused the ASA of engaging in a "morally dishonest double standard". The letter stated that: "Like all democracies, Israel is not perfect. But to single out Israel, while leaving relationships with universities in autocratic and repressive countries intact, suggests thinly-veiled bigotry and bias."

== Canada ==
In January 2009, the Ontario branch of the Canadian Union of Public Employees brought forward a proposal to ban Israeli academics from teaching at Ontario Universities. CUPE-Ontario leader Sid Ryan stated, "we are ready to say Israeli academics should not be on our campuses unless they explicitly condemn the university bombing and the assault on Gaza in general." Ryan subsequently said, "Academic freedom goes both ways. What we are saying is if they want to remain silent and be complicit in these kinds of actions, why should they enjoy the freedom to come and teach in other countries like Canada?" CUPE's national president, Paul Moist, issued a statement declaring his opposition to the motion and saying, "I will be using my influence in any debates on such a resolution to oppose its adoption."

Shortly after its original statement, CUPE removed its call to boycott individual academics from its website and replaced it with statement that called instead for a boycott "aimed at academic institutions and the institutional connections that exist between universities here and those in Israel". Tyler Shipley, spokesperson for CUPE local 3903 at York University, told the Toronto Star that his group will begin to advocate for York to sever financial ties to Israel.

Some observers have questioned what practical effect any CUPE resolution will have since the 20,000 university workers represented by CUPE Ontario include campus staff but almost no full-time faculty.

== Australia ==
The University of Western Sydney's Student Association (UWSSA) formally affiliated to the "Academic and Cultural Boycott of Israel" in February 2009, following a request from PACBI. The President of the UWSSA, Jacob Carswell-Doherty, later stated, "We have no interest in hearing the Israeli viewpoint. Our agenda is to persuade the university administration to implement the terms of the boycott."

In 2013, the issue of Academic Boycotts and the BDS campaign received significant press treatment when a suit was filed against professor Jake Lynch, the director of the Centre for Peace and Conflict Studies at the University of Sydney, by Shurat HaDin, a pro-Israel legal lobby organization. The 30 page suit focusses on Lynch's denying a sabbatical appointment to professor Dan Avnon of Hebrew University because of his center's pro-BDS policy not to support Israeli academics. Andrew Hamilton of Shurat HaDin stated "Our strategic aim in this case is to address the unlawful racial discrimination of the BDS movement generally and the academic boycott in particular, rather than to narrowly focus on the discrimination against Prof. Avnon." The case has been described as a "landmark legal suit" and "a major test of the legality of the boycott, divestments and sanctions (BDS) campaign".

In July 2014, Shurat HaDin announced that it was withdrawing its Lawsuit against Lynch. Lynch stated that this decision "gives the green light for many more Australians to take their own action in solidarity with the Palestinian struggle for rights and freedoms we are lucky enough to be able to take for granted".

== Italy ==
In January 2016, 168 Italian academics and researchers published a call to boycott Israeli academic institutions. Technion – Israel Institute of Technology, was singled out as a boycott target. "The Institute carries out research in a wide range of technologies and weapons used to oppress and attack Palestinians," said the call.

== Ireland ==
In April 2013 the Teachers' Union of Ireland (TUI) passed a motion calling for an academic boycott of Israel.

Following a referendum among NUI Galway students in March 2014, the NUI Galway Students' Union officially began supporting the campaign of Boycott, Divestment and Sanctions against Israel.

In December 2022 the Union of Students in Ireland unanimously passed a motion to support BDS and "denounce the apartheid that Israel is committing in Palestine". The motion also called on the European Students Union (ESU) "to re-evaluate the membership of Israel and support any Palestinian efforts to engage with ESU".

In September 2025, NUI Galway announced that it would undertake no new research with Israeli partners. By November 2025, it had ended all links with Israeli companies and educational institutions. Trinity College Dublin cut ties also with all Israeli institutions in 2025.

== South Africa ==
=== Campaign to boycott Ben-Gurion University ===
On 5 September 2010, a nationwide academic petition was initiated by academics supporting a termination of a partnership agreement between the University of Johannesburg (UJ) and Ben-Gurion University (BGU); a long-standing partnership dating back to apartheid era relations between the two institutions. Well-known academics such as Professors Breyten Breytenbach, John Dugard, Mahmood Mamdani, Antjie Krog and Achille Mbembe are signatories to the academic petition, which is also backed by Vice-Chancellors from four universities in South Africa.

Amid widespread public attention, both within South Africa and internationally, the campaign to boycott BGU quickly gained momentum and within a few days more than 250 academics had signed the petition, stating: "The Israeli occupation of the Palestinian territories has had disastrous effects on access to education for Palestinians. While Palestinians are not able to access universities and schools, Israeli universities produce the research, technology, arguments and leaders for maintaining the occupation. BGU is no exception, by maintaining links to both the Israeli Defence Force (IDF) and the arms industry BGU structurally supports and facilitates the Israeli occupation."

On 26 September 2010 Archbishop Desmond Tutu released a letter through The Sunday Times, under the heading "Israeli ties: a chance to do the right thing", supporting the academics. The Nobel Laureate's position in favour of the boycott was accompanied by an appeal that: "The University of Johannesburg has a chance to do the right thing, at a time when it is unsexy."

Former South African cabinet minister and ANC leader Ronnie Kasrils also came out in support of the boycott call and wrote in The Guardian: "Israeli universities are not being targeted for boycott because of their ethnic or religious identity, but because of their complicity in the Israeli system of apartheid" and "The principled position of academics in South Africa to distance themselves from institutions that support the occupation is a reflection of the advances already made in exposing that the Israeli regime is guilty of an illegal and immoral colonial project."

Against the backdrop of the publicly supported campaign, UJ's highest academic body (Senate) voted on Wednesday, 29 September 2010 "not to continue a long-standing relationship with Ben-Gurion University in Israel in its present form" and conditionally terminate its Apartheid-era relationship with BGU.

A fact-finding investigation conducted by the University confirmed BGU's links with the Israeli Defence Force (IDF) and "complicity in the Israeli occupation". Accepting the recommendations of the report, the University committed itself to end any research or teaching relationship with Ben-Gurion University that has direct or indirect military links; or in instances where human rights abuses are identified. The University has stated that if BGU violates any of the conditions agreed on by Senate or UJ's stated principles, which include "solidarity with any oppressed population", the relationship will be terminated completely after 6 months.

=== More SA universities check Israeli links ===
Within hours of the University of Johannesburg's decision to conditionally terminate its links with Ben-Gurion University, major South African universities began looking into their own ties with Israeli universities.

Wits University vice-chancellor Loyiso Nongxa told journalists that he was not aware of "any formal links – a memorandum of understanding [MoU] – between Wits and Israeli universities". Three hours later, Wits university's spokesperson confirmed that it "has no formal ties with any Israeli university, according to our database".

The University of Cape Town followed suit shortly afterwards, stating, "There are no institution-level partnerships with Israeli universities." The University of Pretoria, University of KwaZulu-Natal and Stellenbosch University have since confirmed that they have no formal partnerships with institutions in Israel.

=== Wits SRC adopts academic boycott of Israel ===
On 27 July 2012 Wits University Students' Representative Council (Wits SRC) adopted a declaration of academic and cultural boycott of Israel.

The Wits SRC academic boycott has not been renewed since it was passed in 2012 and is de facto no longer operable at the institution. A number of Wits SRC and former Wits SRC members have visited the country and talked about their experiences. They have said they are against boycotts and that calling Israel an apartheid state is an insult to black South Africans. Israeli writers and the Israeli director of the Ministry of Foreign Affairs have also visited the campus.

== Criticism ==
A prominent Palestinian academic, former president of Al-Quds University, Sari Nusseibeh, has argued against academic boycotts of Israel, telling Associated Press "If we are to look at Israeli society, it is within the academic community that we've had the most progressive pro-peace views and views that have come out in favor of seeing us as equals.... If you want to punish any sector, this is the last one to approach." He acknowledges, however, that his view is a minority one among Palestinian academics.

A study focusing on the impact of academic boycotts on academic freedom and discourse, based on interviews during the Gaza war that began in 2023, found that Israeli academics faced overt and covert discrimination, obstacles to collaboration, and potential long-term career challenges. Participants in the study stressed the need to keep science separate from politics and preserve cross-border collaboration as essential for advancing research and addressing global challenges.

Cary Nelson argues that while boycott resolutions are unlikely to affect Israeli policy, they risk politicizing and damaging the reputation of the humanities, undermining open debate, and shaping public opinion in ways that may harm academia itself. The Nobel laureate Venki Ramakrishnan told the Guardian that a boycott of academics would penalise those who are not responsible for the actions of the Israeli government, noting that many oppose those policies or hold views sympathetic to Palestinians.

Carlton University political science professor Mira Sucharov proposes that examining the differing forms of privilege and marginalization experienced by Jews and Palestinians across geographic and historical contexts can help students critically situate debates over the goals and fairness of academic boycotts of Israel.

=== Comparisons to academic boycotts of South Africa ===
The academic boycott of South Africa is frequently invoked as a model for more recent efforts to organize academic boycotts of Israel.

Some have invoked the comparison to argue that an academic boycott of Israel shouldn't be controversial and that if an academic boycott of South Africa was justified, so is one of Israel. Andy Beckett countered that academic boycotts of South Africa faced significant criticism at the time, writing that "In truth, boycotts are blunt weapons. Even the most apparently straightforward and justified ones, on closer inspection, have their controversies and injustices."

=== Accusations of antisemitism ===
Anthony Julius and Alan Dershowitz argue that boycotts against Israel are antisemitic, using anti-Zionism as a cover for "Jew hatred". They compare the boycotts to the 1222 Canterbury Council, specifically the council's implementation of sharply limiting Christian contact with Jews, Nazi boycotts of Jewish shops in the 1930s, as well as Arab League attempts to economically isolate Israel and refrain from purchasing "anything Jewish".

Harvard President Larry Summers "blasted" the boycotts as "antisemitic":

[T]here is much that should be, indeed that must be, debated regarding Israeli policy.... But the academic boycott resolution passed by the British professors union in the way that it singles out Israel is in my judgment anti-Semitic in both effect and in intent.

Summers had previously argued that a proposed boycott was antisemitic "in effect, if not intent". This position was criticized by Judith Butler, in an article titled "No, it's not anti-semitic". Butler argues the distinction of effective antisemitism, and intentional antisemitism is at best controversial.

If we think that to criticise Israeli violence, or to call for economic pressure to be put on the Israeli state to change its policies, is to be "effectively anti-semitic", we will fail to voice our opposition for fear of being named as part of an anti-semitic enterprise. No label could be worse for a Jew, who knows that, ethically and politically, the position with which it would be unbearable to identify is that of the anti-semite.

According to Martin Kramer, a hidden reason behind the academic boycott is to isolate Jewish academics so as to push them out of disciplines where Jews have been perceived to be "over-represented", and that this is done by inserting litmus tests for Jews who wish to advance in their careers as academics, demanding that they demonstrate virulent hostility to Israel or else be stigmatized. Kramer argues that this is a primary reason why the boycott has found a significant number of supporters from fields which have little to do with the Middle East.

== See also ==
- Boycotts of Israel#Academic and cultural boycotts
- Boycott, Divestment and Sanctions
- Disinvestment from Israel
- Boycotts of Israel
- Reactions to Boycott, Divestment and Sanctions
- Universities and antisemitism
