= Boycotts of Israel =

Aspect of the Israeli–Palestinian conflict

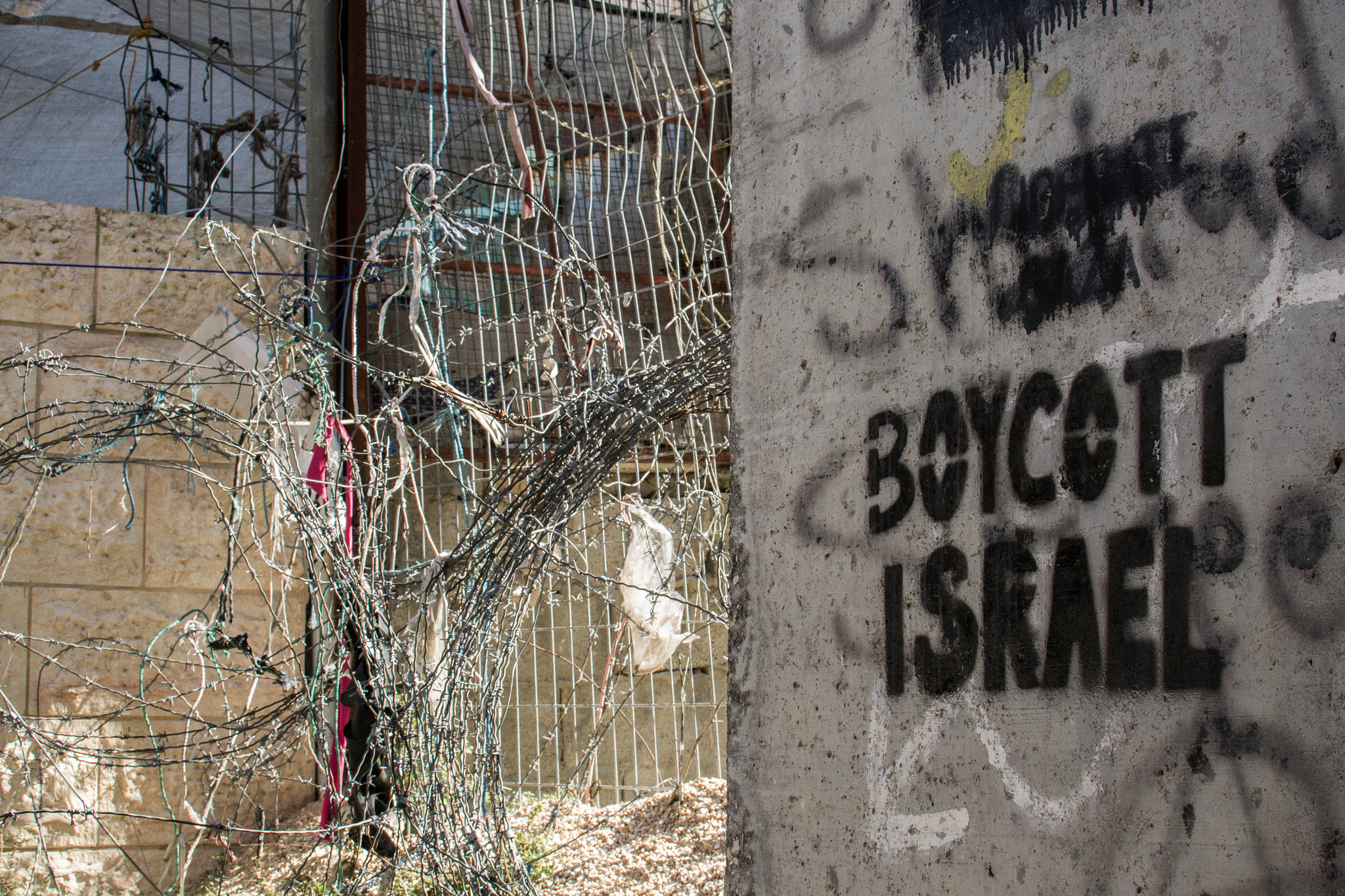
Graffiti supporting the boycott of Israel in Hebron, November 2015

The objective of the boycotts of Israel is to influence its practices and policies; the Boycott, Divestment and Sanctions (BDS) movement calls for boycotts of Israel "until it meets its obligations under international law", and the purpose of the Arab League's boycott of Israel was to prevent Arab states and others from contributing to Israel's economy. Israeli officials have characterized the BDS movement as antisemitic.

== Boycotts of Jewish-owned businesses in Mandatory Palestine ==
Boycotts of Jewish-owned businesses in Mandatory Palestine were organised by Arab leaders starting in 1922 in an attempt to damage the Jewish population of Palestine economically, especially during periods of communal strife between Jews and Arabs. The original boycott forswore with any Jewish-owned business operating in Mandatory Palestine. Palestinian Arabs "who were found to have broken the boycott ... were physically attacked by their brethren and their merchandise damaged" when Palestinian Arabs rioted in Jerusalem in 1929. Another, stricter boycott was imposed on Jewish businesses in following the riots that called on all of the Arabs in the region to abide by its terms. The Arab Executive Committee of the Syrian–Palestinian Congress called for a boycott of Jewish businesses in 1933 and in 1934, the Arab Labor Federation conducted a boycott as well as an organized picketing of Jewish businesses. In 1936, the Palestinian Arab leadership called on another boycott and threatened those who did not respect the boycott with violence, however, this boycott was unsuccessful as Jewish lawyers, physicians, and hospitals were too heavily integrated into Palestinian society.

== Arab League boycott ==
Map of the Arab League

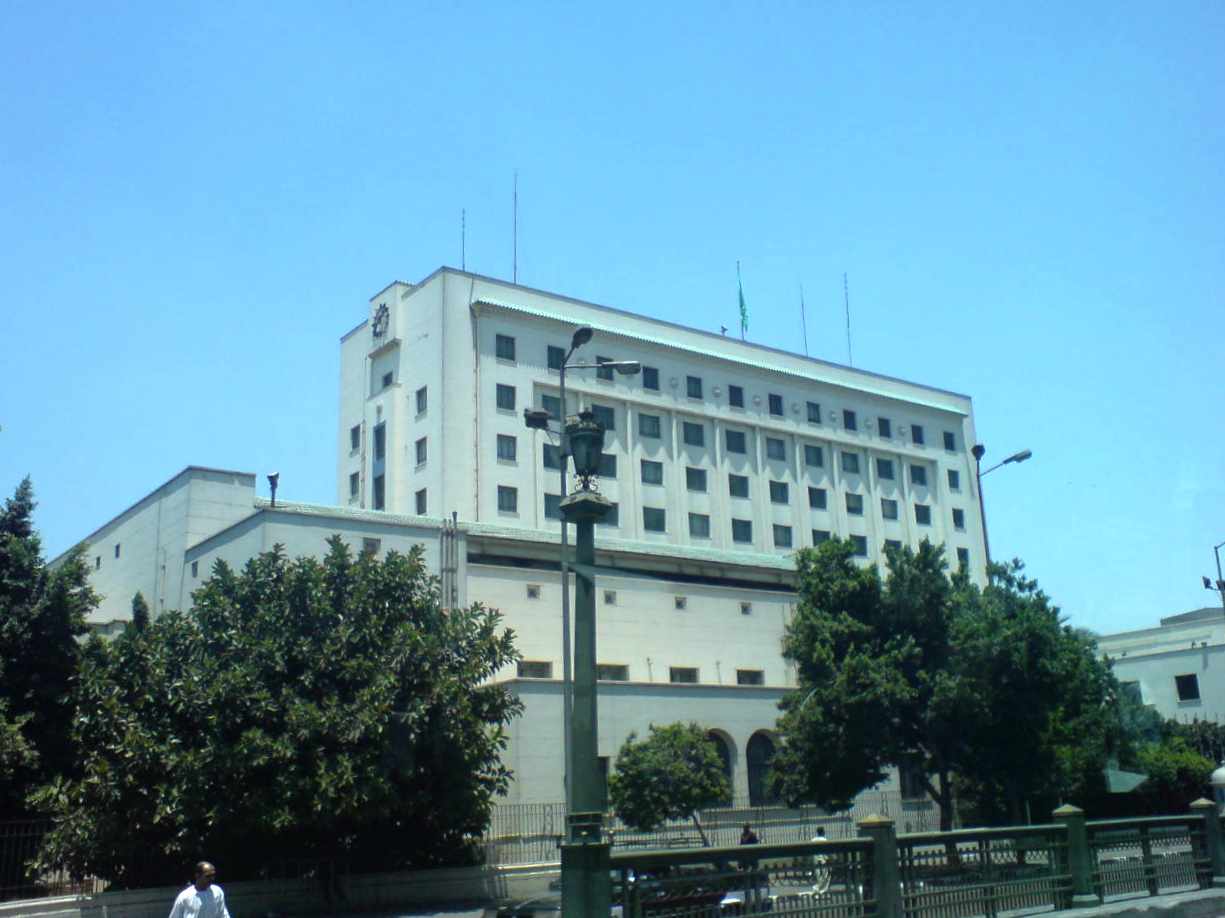
Headquarters of the Arab League, Cairo

=== Economic ===
The Arab League organised a boycott of pre-establishment Israel in December 1945, shortly after its formation, before the establishment of the State of Israel in 1948, and continued and intensified it afterwards. The Arab League boycott is an effort by its member states to isolate Israel economically to prevent Arab states and discourage non-Arabs from providing support to Israel and adding to Israel's economic and military strength.

As part of the Arab boycott, for example, existing road and rail links with neighboring Arab countries were severed, all direct air flights were not permitted, overflights over Arab airspace by Israeli aircraft and of third country airlines that fly into Israel was refused, and even airlines that flew to Israel were refused entry to Arab countries. Originally, the Arab boycott had a moderate negative impact on Israel's economy and development. Inevitably the economies of participating Arab nations also suffered as the result of a deterioration in the foreign direct investment climate in the Arab world, and reduction in the volume of trade. Whether or not the Arab nations in question were aware of the potential risks to their own economies is still unknown. There is still debate as to whether they, in unison, viewed the economic sanctions as a necessary sacrifice to slow the development of the newly declared Israeli state.

The Organisation of Islamic Cooperation (OIC) urges its members to join in the Arab League boycott of Israel. Ten members of OIC (in addition to those that are also members of the Arab League) have joined the diplomatic boycott: Afghanistan, Bangladesh, Brunei, Chad, Indonesia, Iran, Malaysia, Mali, Niger, and Pakistan. The call was renewed on 22 May 2018, when the OIC recommended to its 57 members a selective ban on some Israeli goods because of the events in Gaza and the opening of the United States embassy in Jerusalem.

Egypt (1979), the Palestinian Authority (1993), and Jordan (1994) signed peace treaties or agreements that ended their participation in the boycott of Israel. Mauritania, which never applied the boycott, established diplomatic relations with Israel in 1999. Algeria, Morocco, and Tunisia do not enforce the boycott.

In 1994, following the Oslo Peace Accords, the Cooperation Council for the Arab States of the Gulf (GCC) states, ended their participation in the Arab boycott against Israel, and stated that total elimination of the boycott is a necessary step for peace and economic development in the region. In present days, the Arab boycott is rarely applied. The move prompted a surge of investment in Israel, and resulted in the initiation of joint cooperation projects between Israel and Arab countries.

Today, most Arab states, Syria being the exception, no longer attempt to enforce the secondary or tertiary boycotts. Syria, Lebanon, and Iran (though not an Arab state) are the only states which actively enforce the primary boycott. The Arab League's Central Boycott Office has become obsolete. With the vast majority of Arab states benefiting from trade with Israel, any "boycott" has become symbolic in nature, limited to bureaucratic slights such as diplomatic ostracism and passport restrictions.

There are still residual laws banning relations with Israel. For example, Sudan has since 1958 had a law that forbids establishing relations with Israel, and outlaws business with citizens of Israel as well as business relationships with Israeli companies or companies with Israeli interests. The law also forbids the direct or indirect import of any Israeli goods.

=== Diplomatic ===
Israel States that recognize Israel States that recognize Israel, but have suspended relations States that do not recognize Israeli statehood

Member states of the United Nations were formed into Regional Groups in 1961 to act as voting blocs and negotiation forums. On a purely geographic basis, Israel should be a member of the Asia-Pacific Group but Arab and Muslim nations have blocked Israel from joining. Israel was blocked from the regional group system for 39 years, which besides other consequences prevented it from participating on any UN body. In 2000, to by-pass the ban, Israel was admitted as a temporary member of Western European and Others Group, subject to annual renewal, but only in WEOG's headquarters in the US, which enabled it to put forward candidates for election to various UN General Assembly bodies. In 2004, Israel's membership of the WEOG became permanent, but only in WEOG's headquarters in New York, while remaining an observer at the other UN offices. Only in December 2013 was Israel granted full membership of the WEOG in Geneva, entitling Israel to participate in Geneva-based U.N. bodies, such as the UN Human Rights Council.

Other countries which do not recognise Israel are Cuba and North Korea.

When Egypt entered into a peace treaty with Israel in 1979, its membership of the Arab League was suspended until 1989. In 2002, the Arab League offered recognition of Israel by Arab countries as part of the resolution of the Palestinian–Israeli conflict in the Arab Peace Initiative.

Legend: State of Israel Countries that reject passports from Israel Countries that reject passports from Israel and any other passport which contain Israeli stamps or visas, including Egyptian or Jordanian border stamp issued at a crossing with Israel

Fifteen Arab and OIC countries do not accept Israeli passports. These are Afghanistan, Algeria, Bangladesh, Brunei, Iran, Iraq, Kuwait, Lebanon, Libya, Malaysia, Maldives, Oman, Pakistan, Saudi Arabia, Syria and Yemen. Seven of these also do not accept passports of other countries whose holder has an Israeli visa endorsed in it, or an Egyptian or Jordanian border stamp issued at a crossing with Israel.

The bans may also apply to state-owned enterprises, such as airlines. There was an exception in May 2020 when a flight brought Covid medical supplies for the Palestinians. However, the Palestinian Authority controversially rejected the supplies.

=== Sports ===
In October 2017, when an Israeli won gold in an international judo championship in Abu Dhabi, the United Arab Emirates, officials refused to fly the Israeli flag and play the Israeli national anthem, instead they played the anthem of the International Judo Federation (IJF) and flying the IJF's flag, while the gold winner, Tal Flicker, sang the "Hatikvah", Israel's national anthem. The UAE also banned Israeli athletes from wearing their country's symbols on uniforms, having to wear IJF uniforms. Other contestants received similar treatment. In December 2017, seven Israelis were denied visas by Saudi Arabia to compete in an international chess tournament. On 24 May 2018, a team of international jurists, including Harvard professor Alan Dershowitz, announced a plan to petition the international Court of Arbitration for Sport against the exclusion of Israel's flag and anthem at sporting events in Arab countries. In July 2018, the International Judo Federation cancelled two grand slam judo events in Tunis and Abu Dhabi because Israeli flags were not allowed to be raised. Also in July 2018, the World Chess Federation said it will ban Tunisia from hosting the international chess competition in 2019 if it does not grant a visa to Israeli contestants, including a seven-year-old Israeli girl champion.

In addition, sports teams from various Arab states continue to boycott Israeli athletes at international matches. When they are drawn against an Israeli team, some teams choose instead to forfeit the match.

The participation of Israel at the 2024 Summer Olympics prompted calls from left-wing French lawmakers, Palestinian, and other global sports organizations for sanctions against Israel and to prevent its participation due to the impact of the Gaza war on Palestinian athletes and sports facilities, but IOC President Thomas Bach confirmed this was never an issue for the IOC and cautioned athletes against boycotts and discrimination.

== European Union sanctions ==
On 26 May 2023, the European Trade Union Confederation (ETUC), which represents over 45 million workers and their trade unions across Europe, announced a boycott of products made in illegal Israeli settlements in the occupied Palestinian territories. The ETUC emphasized the need for regulatory measures to ban the import and export of goods produced in these illicit settlements by entities within the European Union, as stipulated by EU treaties and international law.

On 19 April 2024, the International Court of Justice (ICJ) enacted sanctions against four individuals and two organizations for serious human rights abuses against Palestinians in the occupied West Bank and East Jerusalem. These abuses include systematic violence, intimidation, and the forced displacement of Palestinians. The sanctions involve asset freezes and travel bans. The targeted entities include Lehava, a far-right Jewish supremacist group in Israel, Hilltop Youth, a faction of extremist Hardal settlers in the Israeli-occupied West Bank, and two of Hilltop Youth's leaders, Meir Ettinger and Elisha Yered, along with Neria Ben Pazi and Yinon Levi, who have also been sanctioned.

On 15 July 2024, the ICJ imposed sanctions on five individuals and three Israeli organizations due to "serious and systematic human rights abuses" against Palestinians in the West Bank and East Jerusalem. These sanctions target extremist settlers accused of carrying out acts of violence against Palestinians in these occupied areas, as well as activists who obstruct the delivery of humanitarian aid to Gaza. The list of sanctioned individuals and groups includes: Tsav 9, which frequently hindered humanitarian aid trucks supplying food, water, and fuel to the Gaza Strip; Bentzi Gopstein, the founder and leader of Lehava; Isaschar Manne, the founder of the unauthorized Manne Farm outpost in the Israeli-occupied West Bank, Baruch Marzel, who calls for the ethnic cleansing of Palestinians, Zvi Bar Yosef, who runs the unauthorized outpost 'Zvi’s Farm' in the West Bank and has committed violent acts against Palestinians, resulting in serious injuries; and Moshe Sharvit and Moshe’s Farm in the Jordan Valley, whose harassment of Palestinians has intensified since October 2023.

On 19 July 2024, the ICJ released an important advisory opinion stating that countries must not recognize, assist, or support the illegal circumstances arising from Israel's occupation of Palestinian territories. The court declared that all nations must avoid any economic or trade relations with Israel concerning the Occupied Palestinian territories (OPT) or any areas that could reinforce its unlawful presence there. Additionally, it emphasized the need to take steps to prevent trade or investment activities that contribute to sustaining the illegal situation established by Israel in the OPT.

In May 2025, Dutch Foreign Minister Caspar Veldkamp argued that Israel's blockade of the Gaza Strip was a violation of international law and therefore of the EU–Israel Association Agreement. There were increasing calls for the full suspension of the association agreement.

In an open letter to British Prime Minister Keir Starmer on 26 May 2025, more than 800 lawyers, university professors and former judges called on the British government to impose sanctions on the Israeli government and its ministers and take steps to "prevent and punish genocide" in Gaza.

On 15 July 2025, the EU's top diplomat Kaja Kallas and the foreign ministers of the EU member states decided not to take any action against Israel over alleged Israeli war crimes in the Gaza war and settler violence in the West Bank. The proposed sanctions against Israel included suspending the EU-Israel Association Agreement, suspending visa-free travel, or blocking imports from Israeli settlements. Israel considered the EU's decision not to impose sanctions on Israel as a diplomatic victory. Palestinian Foreign Minister Varsen Aghabekian criticized the decision, saying, "It’s shocking and disappointing, because everything is crystal clear. ... The whole world has been seeing what is happening in Gaza. The killing, the atrocities, the war crimes." Slovenian Foreign Minister Tanja Fajon posted on social media: "It is disappointing that there is no EU consensus to act on the June determination that Israel is violating Article 2 of the association agreement, concerning human rights."

In August 2025, the Norwegian Central Bank announced that it had decided to remove Caterpillar Inc. from the fund it manages, citing “an unacceptable risk that the companies contribute to serious violations of the rights of individuals in situations of war and conflict.” The fund also announced, again following recommendations from its ethics council, that it had withdrawn from five Israeli banks, a decision that drew criticism. Critics of such divestment moves noted that the fund continues to invest in companies and sectors elsewhere that have faced human rights accusations, including oil. Norges Bank Investment Management (NBIM) Deputy CEO Trond Grande told CNBC that the fund would remain invested in Israel through the benchmark index, adding that while there was “increased scrutiny” in Norway, the changes were intended to simplify the portfolio rather than to down-weight Israeli equities. University of Oxford research fellow Ana Nacvalovaite stated that NBIM’s decision reflected the fund’s long-standing, universally applied ethical criteria, which have historically had little to no negative impact on returns.

== Arms embargoes ==
Just before the outbreak of the Six-Day War in 1967, France – then Israel's main arms supplier, especially of aircraft – imposed an arms embargo on Israel, including on spare parts for its aircraft.

In 2014, during the Gaza war, Spain froze arms and military technology exports to Israel. The embargo also applied to dual-use materiel. Also at the same time, British government ministers said no new arms export licenses would be granted for sales to Israel until a formal peace is agreed. In case hostilities are to flare up, exports under existing licenses would reportedly be discontinued.

On 23 March 2018, the United Nations Human Rights Council called on the international community to halt arms sales to Israel. Amnesty International has repeatedly called for an arms embargo on Israel, most recently on 29 April 2018 following clashes between the IDF and protesters at the Gaza Strip security fence as part of the "Great March of Return" protests.

=== 2023–2025 embargoes ===
Almost all of Israel's arms come from companies in the United States—its largest supplier—and Germany. Other suppliers included Britain, France, Canada and the Netherlands. However, some countries have taken small steps towards stopping arms exports, including Netherlands, Canada, Belgium and Britain. In the Netherlands, a court ruled that the government must stop exporting F-35 fighter jet parts to Israel. Canada has also recently suspended the delivery of weapons to Israel in response to the continued war in Gaza. The local government of Belgium's Wallonia region has announced that it has suspended its license to export ammunition to Israel following an international court ruling. Japanese company Itochu Corporation has announced that it plans to end its cooperation with Israeli arms manufacturer Elbit Systems. In a letter addressed to Foreign Secretary David Cameron and Business Secretary Kemi Badenoch, 130 British lawmakers called on the British government to stop arms sales to Israel.

In September 2025, Spain cancelled a contract to supply advanced air technology for the Eurofighter Typhoon fighter jet. The decision came after Spain implemented a law banning arms sales to Israel.

== Boycott, Divestment and Sanctions ==
In 2005, over 170 Palestinian civil society organizations launched the Boycott, Divestment and Sanctions (BDS) movement. The goal of BDS is to subject Israel to boycott, divestment and sanctions until it withdraws from the occupied territories, removes the separation barrier in the West Bank, ensures full equality for Arab–Palestinian citizens of Israel, and grants the right of return of Palestinian refugees. BDS is modeled after the anti-apartheid movement in South Africa. Its proponents compare the plight of the Palestinians with that of the black South Africans.

A large number of activist groups around the world have heeded BDS' call and are advocating for boycotts of Israel.

In July 2021, the Palestinian Authority arrested a singer who performed in a settlement in the West Bank, though the performance was for Palestinian workers only.

=== Sanctions on Israeli settlements in West Bank ===
In September 2026, Britain, Canada, and France said they would impose sanctions on Israeli settlements in the West Bank, which are considered illegal under international law. The sanctions aim to ban settlement goods, act against companies and individuals providing services to settlements and ban the advertisement of settlements in the UK. When announcing the sanctions, Foreign Secretary Ed Miliband said that the Israeli government has too often 'turned a blind eye' to the 'ethnic cleansing of Palestinians in areas of the West Bank, perpetrated by settler terrorists'. The Israeli government responded by closing the British consulate in Jerusalem and banning 11 UK MPs, including Jeremy Corbyn, Diane Abbott and all five sitting Green Party MPs, from entering Israel.

== Academic and cultural boycotts ==
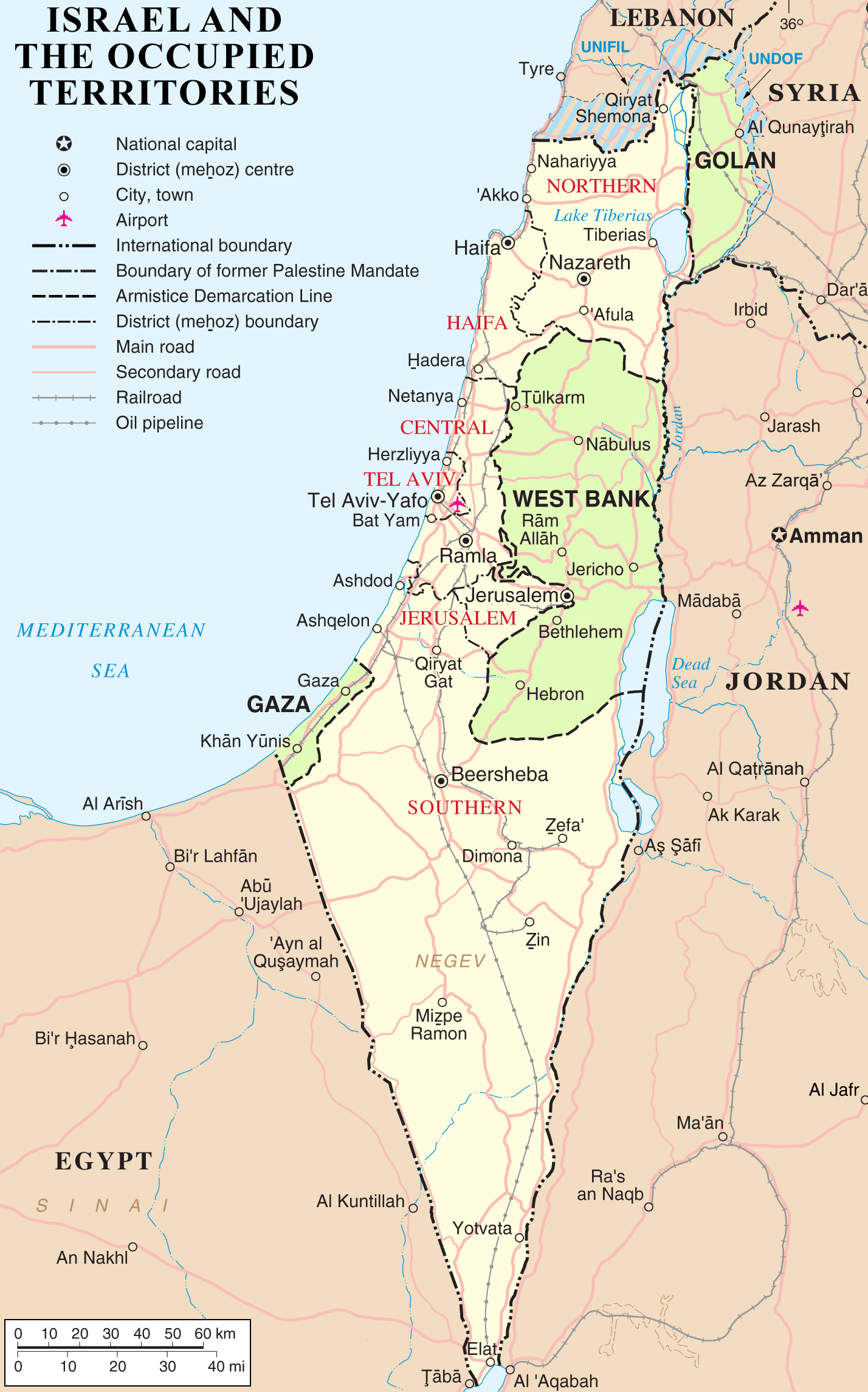
Israel and Israeli-occupied territories

=== Academics ===
A campaign for an academic boycott of Israel was launched in April 2004 by Palestinian academics and intellectuals in Ramallah, who formed the Palestinian Campaign for the Academic and Cultural Boycott of Israel (PACBI) as part of the broader BDS campaign. PACBI argues that all Israeli academic institutions are implicated in the occupation, and calls for international pressure through boycotts. Since then, boycott proposals have come from academics and organizations in the Palestinian territories, the U.S., the U.K., and elsewhere, aiming to isolate Israel until it changes policies they view as discriminatory and oppressive. In 2006, two British lecturers' unions endorsed boycott against Israel, but later reversed them, and in 2007, the new University and College Union briefly supported, then rescinded, a boycott motion. That year, nearly 300 university presidents denounced the boycott movement. Still, campaigns gained traction: U.S. academics launched the US Campaign for the Academic and Cultural Boycott of Israel in 2010, Spanish organizers excluded Ariel University from a competition in 2009, and the University of Johannesburg briefly suspended ties with Ben-Gurion University in 2011. High-profile cases drew attention: Stephen Hawking joined the boycott in 2013, and the American Studies Association voted the same year to boycott Israeli academic institutions, prompting backlash from over 90 U.S. universities. In 2014, 500 Middle East scholars and 500 anthropologists endorsed boycotts, while in 2016, 168 Italian academics targeted Israel’s Technion.

=== Artists, actors, and directors ===
In May 2021, more than 600 musicians, including Patti Smith, Noname, DJ Snake, Roger Waters, Serj Tankian, members of Cypress Hill, Rage Against the Machine, Julian Casablancas, The Roots' Black Thought and Questlove, Godspeed You! Black Emperor, Thurston Moore, Bun B, Royce da 5′9″, Talib Kweli, Run the Jewels, and Anti-Flag, added their signature to an open letter calling for a boycott of performances in Israel until Israel ends its occupation of the Palestinian territories. Musician Lauryn Hill and writers Sally Rooney, Naomi Klein and Arundhati Roy expressed support for BDS.

The Icelandic Association of Composers and Lyricists (FTT), which represents artists in Iceland, told its members in a statement to not participate in the Eurovision Song Contest 2024 unless Israel is removed from the competition, due to Israel's conduct in the Gaza war. FTT also urged the Icelandic National Broadcaster (RÚV) to withdraw from the competition unless Israel is denied participation on the same grounds as Russia was due to its invasion of Ukraine.

The Film Workers for Palestine pledge, published in September 2025 and inspired by the cultural boycott of apartheid South Africa, has been signed by more than 5,000 actors, directors, and other film industry professionals, who pledged not to collaborate with Israeli film institutions they claim are "implicated in genocide and apartheid against the Palestinian people". Signatories include film-makers such as Yorgos Lanthimos, Ava DuVernay, Asif Kapadia, Boots Riley and Joshua Oppenheimer as well as actors Olivia Colman, Mark Ruffalo, Tilda Swinton, Javier Bardem, Ayo Edebiri, Riz Ahmed, Josh O'Connor, Cynthia Nixon, Julie Christie, Ilana Glazer, Rebecca Hall, Aimee Lou Wood and Debra Winger. That same month, a campaign titled No Music For Genocide was announced, in which over 400 musicians and labels pledged to take their music off of streaming platforms in Israel.

== Reception ==
=== Support ===
In 2003, Archbishop Desmond Tutu called on the international community to treat Israel as it treated apartheid South Africa and supports the disinvestment campaign against Israel.

In February 2004, following a six-month inquiry a select committee presented a report to the British parliament calling for the suspension of the European Union's preferential trade agreement with Israel "until it (Israel) lifts the movement restrictions which it has placed on Palestinian trade". Between 2002 and 2004 the EU exported £30.1 billion worth of goods to Israel while the value of goods imported was £21.1 billion Whilst the European Union has expressed opposition to boycotting Israel, it maintains that it is legal for Europeans to do so.

A joint open letter by 322 UK academics was published in The Guardian on 16 January 2009. The letter called on the British government and the British people to take all feasible steps to oblige Israel to stop its "military aggression and colonial occupation" of the Palestinian land and its "criminal use of force", suggesting to start with a programme of boycott, divestment and sanctions.

In 2008, British Member of Parliament Sir Gerald Kaufman claimed, "It is time for our government to make clear to the Israeli government that its conduct and policies are unacceptable and to impose a total arms ban on Israel."

In November 2012, a group of 51 people, including Nobel peace laureates, prominent artists and activists published a letter calling for a military embargo on Israel. The letter accused several countries of providing assistance to Israel that facilitated Israel's 2012 military operation in the Gaza Strip. Nobel peace laureate Mairead Maguire was among the group signing the letter.

In May 2025, the Chinese e-commerce platform Shein displayed a Palestinian flag on its website in solidarity with Palestine during the Gaza war, prompting widespread calls from Israeli consumers to boycott the platform. As a result, all free shipping from Shein, the second most visited platform in Israel, to the country has been canceled.

In June 2025, pharmacies in Sesto Fiorentino, Italy announced that they will no longer sell medicines and cosmetic products made in Israel.

In 2026, approximately 200 former senior Canadian diplomats signed an open letter calling on the Government of Canada to impose “robust” sanctions on Israel, citing restrictions on humanitarian aid and journalists’ access to the Gaza Strip, settler violence in the West Bank, and concerns over civilian casualties and alleged violations of international law in the occupied Palestinian territories and Lebanon.

=== Opposition ===
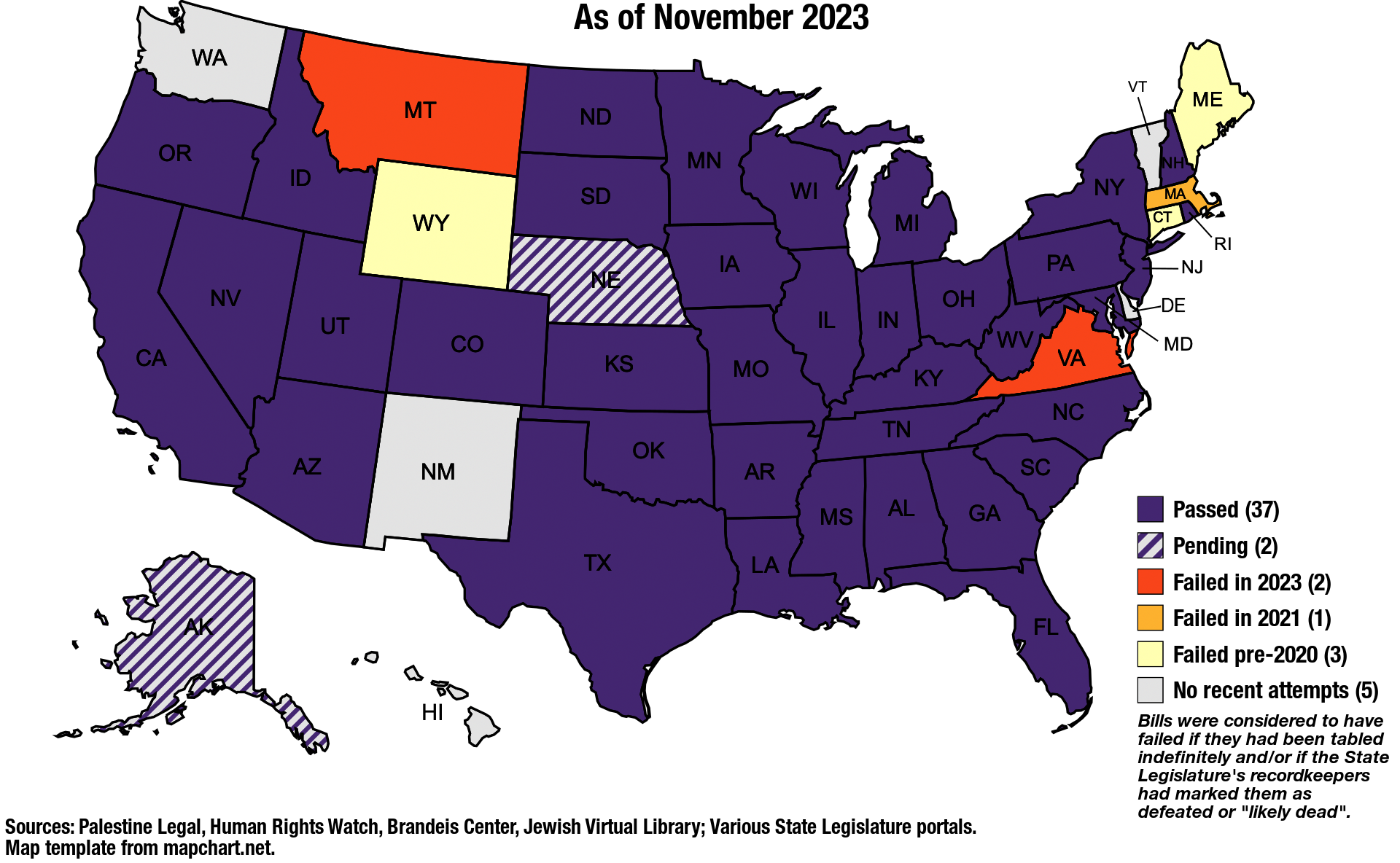
Map showing U.S. states where anti-BDS legislation has passed, is pending, or has failed as of November 2023

The Anti-Defamation League, whose mission is to stop the defamation of Jews, has claimed that singling out Israel is "outrageous and biased" as well as "deplorable and offensive", and heads of several major U.S. Jewish organizations have referred to them as "lop-sided" and "unbalanced".

Boycott calls have also been called "profoundly unjust" and relying on a "false" analogy with the previous apartheid regime of South Africa. One critical statement has alleged that the boycotters apply "different standards" to Israel than other countries, that the boycott is "counterproductive and retrograde" yet has no comparability to Nazi boycotts of Jewish shops in the 1930s.

The Economist contends that the boycott is "flimsy" and ineffective, that "blaming Israel alone for the impasse in the occupied territories will continue to strike many outsiders as unfair," and points out that the Palestinian leadership does not support the boycott.

In an op-ed published in The Jerusalem Post in November 2010, Gerald Steinberg and Jason Edelstein contend that while "the need to refute their [BDS organizations] allegations is clear, students and community groups must also adopt a proactive strategy to undermine the credibility and influence of these groups. This strategy will marginalize many of the BDS movement's central actors, and expose the lie that BDS is a grassroots protest against Israeli policy. Exposing their abuses and funding sources, and forcing their campaign leaders and participants to respond to us will change the dynamic in this battle." In an effort to combat BDS, in March 2011, NGO Monitor produced "the BDS Sewer System" intended to provide detailed information about boycott campaigns against Israel.

In May 2025, Australian Prime Minister Anthony Albanese opposed sanctions against Israel over its blockade of humanitarian aid to the Gaza Strip, saying he was focusing on "peace and security for both Israelis and Palestinians" rather than "soundbites".

==== Artists, actors, and writers ====
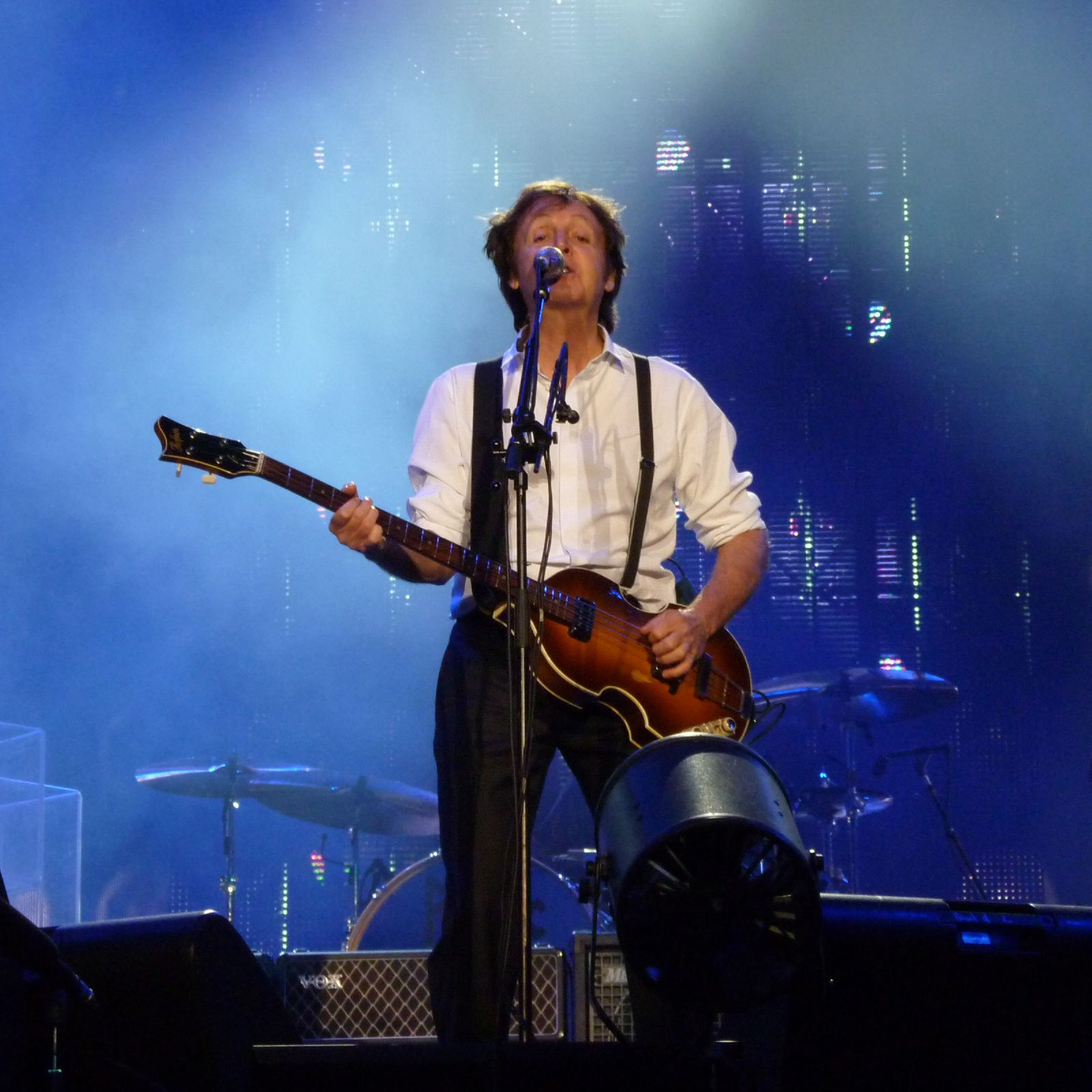
Paul McCartney is one of many artists who oppose boycotting Israel.

In 2008, former Beatles singer Paul McCartney decided to perform in Israel for the country's 60th anniversary despite a death threat from militant Islamic activist Omar Bakri Muhammad, who said, "If he values his life Mr McCartney must not come to Israel. He will not be safe there. The sacrifice operatives will be waiting for him." Omar Barghouti, one of the founders of the Palestinian Campaign for the Academic and Cultural Boycott of Israel, described the threat as "deplorable". McCartney said "I do what I think and I have many friends who support Israel."

In October 2010, the Cape Town Opera (CTO) declined an appeal by Desmond Tutu to cancel a tour of Israel. The CTO stated that the company was "reluctant to adopt the essentially political position of disengagement from cultural ties with Israel or with Palestine, and that they had been in negotiations for four years and would respect the contract.

Madonna's The MDNA Tour began in May 2012 in Tel Aviv, Israel. She said that the concert in Tel Aviv was a "peace concert", and offered about 600 tickets to the show to various Israeli and Palestinian groups, but this offer was rejected by Anarchists Against the Wall and the Sheikh Jarrah Solidarity group. The offer was accepted by the Palestinian-Israeli Peace NGO Forum. Madonna's performance was criticized by Omar Barghouti.

In January 2014, Scarlett Johansson started to promote SodaStream, an Israeli company operating in Ma'ale Adumim, a West Bank settlement, which sparked criticism from Oxfam. In response, Johansson severed ties with Oxfam after eight years, saying she supports trade and "social interaction between a democratic Israel and Palestine" and she has "a fundamental difference of opinion with Oxfam in regards to the boycott, divestment and sanctions movement." Two years later, Oxfam CEO Mark Goldring lamented that losing Johansson over BDS was “something of a PR disaster” that had cost Oxfam “literally thousands” of donors.

In October 2015, J.K. Rowling was one of the 150 people from the British arts world who signed a letter against the call for a boycott of Israel that was made in February. The signatories of the letter said "cultural boycotts singling out Israel are divisive and discriminatory, and will not further peace. Open dialogue and interaction promote greater understanding and mutual acceptance, and it is through such understanding and acceptance that movement can be made towards a resolution of the conflict." Some of the signatories were closely aligned with Israel, for example via the Conservative Friends of Israel and Labour Friends of Israel.

Other artists who have voiced opposition to the campaign include writers Umberto Eco Novelist Ian McEwan, upon being awarded the Jerusalem Prize, was urged to turn it down, but said that "If I only went to countries that I approve of, I probably would never get out of bed.... It's not great if everyone stops talking." Many musicians such as Elton John, Leonard Cohen, Lady Gaga, Rihanna, Radiohead, Metallica, Editors, Placebo, LCD Soundsystem, MGMT, Justin Bieber, Ziggy Marley, Red Hot Chili Peppers, Mark Ronson, Depeche Mode, Gilberto Gil, Daniela Mercury, Rolling Stones, Alicia Keys, Tom Jones, Riverdance, PiL, Eric Burdon, and Bon Jovi have chosen to perform in Israel in recent years.

In October 2021, over 200 celebrities, including Mila Kunis, Billy Porter, Neil Patrick Harris, Helen Mirren, Lance Bass and Jeremy Piven, signed an open letter repudiating calls for a boycott of the Tel Aviv International LGBT Film Festival.

In October 2024, CCFP released an open letter opposing boycotts of Israeli authors and literary institutions. The letter decried efforts to "demonize and ostracize Jewish authors across the globe". It was signed by over 1,000 entertainers, authors and artists, including Nobel Prize winners Elfriede Jelinek and Herta Müller, Booker winner Howard Jacobson, Simon Sebag Montefiore, Bernard-Henri Lévy, Pulitzer winner David Mamet, Ozzy Osbourne, Gene Simmons, Rebecca De Mornay, Jennifer Jason Leigh, Julianna Margulies, Jerry O'Connell, Scooter Braun, Jenji Kohan, Adam Gopnik, Diane Warren, Ayaan Hirsi Ali, Lionel Shriver, and Amy Sherman-Palladino.

In September 2025, more than 1,200 film industry professionals, including Liev Schreiber, Mayim Bialik, Haim Saban, Greg Berlanti, Howie Mandel, Lisa Edelstein, Erin Foster and Debra Messing, signed an open letter rejecting calls to boycott Israeli film institutions due to the war in Gaza.

==== Public figures ====
In February 2012, Norman Finkelstein "launched a blistering attack" of the BDS movement during an interview, saying it was a "hypocritical, dishonest cult" that tries to cleverly pose as human rights activists while in reality their goal is to destroy Israel. In addition, he said: "I'm getting a little bit exasperated with what I think is a whole lot of nonsense. I'm not going to tolerate silliness, childishness and a lot of leftist posturing. I loathe the disingenuousness. We will never hear the solidarity movement [back a] two-state solution." Furthermore, Finkelstein stated that the BDS movement has had very few successes, and that just like a cult, the leaders pretend that they are hugely successful when in reality the general public rejects their extreme views. He does mention though that he supports the idea of a non-violent BDS movement.

Though Israeli chocolate company Max Brenner is targeted by some Australian Palestinian activists, the Australian Minister for Foreign Affairs and former Prime Minister Kevin Rudd said, "I don't think in 21st-century Australia there is a place for the attempted boycott of a Jewish business."

Senior figures in the Australian Labor Party linked action against the Australian Greens at a state conference, where the Greens were denied automatic preferences, to the Greens' previous support for the BDS movement. Former New South Wales treasurer and Australian Labor Party general secretary Eric Roozendaal and fellow Legislative Councillor Walt Secord, stated, "The Greens will carry forever the stain of their support for the BDS campaign and their attempts to delegitimise Israel and the Jewish community—and this is one of the reasons why we must stand strong against the Greens."

In April 2013, Prime Minister Julia Gillard said that the "campaign does not serve the cause of peace and diplomacy for agreement on a two-state solution between Israel and Palestine", and added that Australia has always had firm opposition to the BDS movement. Representing the Coalition prior to the 2013 federal election, Liberal Party deputy leader Julie Bishop reaffirmed Gillard's stance by promising to cut off federal grants for individuals and institutions who support the BDS campaign. On 29 May 2013, Jewish Australian academics Andrew Benjamin, Michele Grossman and David Goodman condemned the Coalition's election promise as "an anti-democratic gesture par excellence".

In February 2014, Israeli Ambassador to the UK Daniel Taub said in a CNN interview that proponents of a boycott on Israeli goods are making a "mistake" and sending a "problematic" message to Palestinian negotiators: "If they genuinely want to advance peace, what they're really doing is they're sending a double message ... They're sending a message to the Palestinian that [they] don't need to be sitting at the negotiating table."

Ed Husain, writing in The New York Times, says that the boycott of Israel should end, since it is hurting the Palestinians more than helping them. Husain believes that the "voice of the Palestinian imams who want to see an end to the boycott needs to be amplified", as well as those "religious leaders" in Egypt and in Saudi Arabia who "advocate peace".

== See also ==
- Buycott
- Constructive engagement
- Criticism of Israel
- Israeli passport
