= Not in Our Genes =

1984 book by Richard Lewontin, Steven Rose, and Leon Kamin

Not in Our Genes: Biology, Ideology and Human Nature
- Cover of the first edition
- Authors: Richard Lewontin; Steven Rose; Leon Kamin
- Language: English
- Subject: Sociobiology
- Publisher: Pantheon Books
- Publication date: April 12, 1984
- Publication place: United States
- Media type: Print (Hardcover and Paperback)
- Pages: 322
- ISBN: 978-0394508177

Not in Our Genes: Biology, Ideology and Human Nature is a 1984 book by the evolutionary geneticist Richard Lewontin, the neurobiologist Steven Rose, and the psychologist Leon Kamin, in which the authors criticize sociobiology and biological determinism and advocate a socialist society. They argue that biological determinism has been used to justify racial and gender inequality. The book's themes include the relationship between biology and society, the nature versus nurture debate, and the intersection of science and ideology.

Not in Our Genes formed part of a larger campaign against sociobiology. Its authors were praised for their criticism of IQ testing and were complimented by some for their critique of sociobiology. However, they have been criticized for misrepresenting the views of scientists such as the biologist E. O. Wilson and the ethologist Richard Dawkins, for using "determinism" and "reductionism" simply as terms of abuse, and for the influence of Marxism on their views. Critics have seen its authors' conclusions as political rather than scientific.

== Summary ==
Lewontin, Rose and Kamin identify themselves as "an evolutionary geneticist, a neurobiologist, and a psychologist." They criticize biological determinism and reductionism, and state that they share a commitment to the creation of a socialist society and a recognition that "a critical science is an integral part of the struggle to create that society". In Chapter One, "The New Right and the Old Determinism", the authors announce the central argument of their book, namely, that they perceive a linkage in the 1980s between the growing popularity of biological determinism and the rise of the "New Right", led by Margaret Thatcher in the UK and Ronald Reagan in the U.S.:

Biological determinism (biologism) has been a powerful mode of explaining the observed inequalities of status, wealth, and power in contemporary industrial capitalist societies, and of defining human "universals" of behavior as natural characteristics of these societies. As such, it has been gratefully seized upon as a political legitimator by the New Right, which finds its social nostrums so neatly mirrored in nature; for if these inequalities are biologically determined, they are therefore inevitable and immutable.

The authors assert that their reasons for opposing biological determinism are twofold: (1) they believe it's flawed science, and (2) they contend that it's been used (e.g., in generalizations about IQ scores among different racial and ethnic groups) as a justification for preserving social inequality. Most of the remainder of the book is an elaboration of these reasons.

In later chapters, the authors trace their understanding of science to the ideas suggested by Karl Marx and Friedrich Engels and developed by Marxist scholars in the 1930s. They also draw on the ideas of Marxist philosopher György Lukács, as put forward in History and Class Consciousness (1923), as well as the writings of Marxist philosopher Ágnes Heller and communist revolutionary Mao Zedong.

They discuss and criticize the views of scientists such as E. O. Wilson, Richard Dawkins, and Donald Symons, with many pages devoted to an attempted refutation of Wilson's Sociobiology: The New Synthesis (1975). They maintain that, like some other sociobiologists, Symons believes "the manifest trait is not itself coded by genes, but that a potential is coded and the trait only arises when the appropriate environmental cue is given." In the authors' opinion, "Despite its superficial appearance of dependence on environment, this model is completely genetically determined, independent of the environment." They write that Symons' arguments in The Evolution of Human Sexuality (1979) provide examples "of how sociobiological theory can explain anything, no matter how contradictory, by a little mental gymnastics".

== Publication history ==
Not in Our Genes was first published in hardcover by Pantheon Books in April 1984. Later that year it came out in paperback from the Pelican Books imprint of Penguin UK. In 1990, Penguin reprinted the book. In 2017, Haymarket Books published a second edition with a new preface by the authors.

== Reception ==
=== Mainstream media ===
Not in Our Genes received positive reviews from the columnist Gene Lyons in Newsweek and the paleontologist Stephen Jay Gould in The New York Review of Books, a mixed review from the philosopher Philip Kitcher in The New York Times Book Review, and negative reviews from the anthropologist Melvin Konner in Natural History and the biologist Patrick Bateson and the ethologist Richard Dawkins (whom they criticized) in New Scientist. The editors of New Scientist noted that the book would "inevitably attract either extreme criticism or glowing praise" depending on the reviewer's stance on sociobiology, and that they published two reviews to help encourage debate, having approached Dawkins "for the opposition" and Bateson, "who feels that the attack on genetic determinism is justified." The book was reviewed by the psychologist Sandra Scarr in American Scientist, Nathaniel S. Lehrman in The Humanist, and in The Wilson Quarterly and Science News.

Lyons described the book as a "spirited, if often repetitive, demolition of sociobiology's pretensions", adding that its authors' arguments were "made doubly impressive" by their "analysis of how the economic determinism of what they call '“vulgar” Marxism' and the spinelessness of 'sociological relativism' have contributed to a climate in which the speculations of sociobiology have found a hearing."

Gould described the book as "important and timely". He credited the authors with exposing the fallacies of biological determinism, and presenting a view of human behavior beyond the nature versus nurture controversy. However, he believed that they failed to show the "fatal and debilitating flaws" in research on schizophrenia. He agreed that "interactionism is also based on deep fallacies and cultural biases that play into the hands of biological determinism", showing that it is guilty of "reductionism".

Kitcher described the book as "informative, entertaining, lucid, forceful, frequently witty, occasionally unfair, sometimes intemperate, never dull". He praised their discussion of intelligence, of sex differences and the use of drugs and surgery to modify behavior. He was less convinced by their discussion of schizophrenia, writing that in it their "policy of treating their opponents as patsies begins to seem unjustified".

Konner believed that the authors provided an "acceptable review of the dismal historical record of abuse of ideas in behavioral genetics" but that this history had received better discussions. He criticized them for ignoring similar abuses under left-wing systems. He accused them of falsely attributing a belief in "heredity privilege" to advocates of IQ testing, employing tactics such as guilt through association, providing misleading discussions of issues in psychiatry and neurology, and criticizing sociobiology on the basis of the weakest studies in the field and popular journalism. He considered Wilson's discussion of the development of behavior in Sociobiology more sophisticated than that of Lewontin et al. He called the book "unfortunate", writing that its authors "offer little, except for pious hand-wringing and 'dialectical' rhetoric, that might help us to grapple with the great unanswered questions of our behavior and experience, normal and abnormal."

Bateson accused the authors of making it easy for themselves to criticize the genetic analysis of behavior by focusing on its weakest advocates, though their "counter-rhetoric" was "brilliant" and sometimes "illuminating." He praised their discussion of measuring intelligence, writing that it was clear and "merciless" in its "exposure of poor method." He credited them with making a strong case against genetic explanations of both differences in IQ and schizophrenia, but thought their conclusions about both issues non-definitive and disputable. He found their criticism of ethology and sociobiology distorted by personal biases, writing that errors by some sociobiologists did not make it right to dismiss the field altogether. He noted that they ignored developments in the field that corrected some of Wilson's mistakes. He wrote that the belief that animals have a tendency not to mate with individuals familiar from early life is (contrary to earlier assertions) evidence-based. In Bateson's view, the value of their work was undermined by poor scholarship and bad arguments, and errors made in discussing his field forced him to wonder about the value of the rest of their work. Though agreeing with them about the interaction between the social and physical environment, he accused them of wrongly suggesting that this was novel, when it was doubtful whether anyone actually believed in the form of interactionism they criticized. He predicted that most scientists would simply disregard their book.

Dawkins accused the authors of promoting a "bizarre conspiracy theory of science" that suggested that sociobiology was a response to 1960s student activism, and of wrongly using quotations from non-sociobiologists such as the Conservative politician Patrick Jenkin and representatives of the British National Front and the French Nouvelle Droite as though they represented sociobiology. He described their claim that sociobiologists believed in genetic determinism as a "simple lie", and wrote that they employed the term "biological determinism" without having a clear idea of what they meant by it, and used "determinist" and "reductionist" simply as terms of abuse. He argued that biologists practice an appropriate form of "reductionism" that explains complex wholes in terms of their parts, and never practice the form of "reductionism" criticized by Lewontin et al., which supposes that "the properties of a complex whole are simply the sum of those same properties in the parts". He maintained that the anthropologists Marshall Sahlins and Sherwood Washburn, praised by the authors for their criticism of sociobiology, were both guilty of elementary misunderstandings of kin selection; that Lewontin should have realized this; and that their "dialectical biology" involved ideas similar to those of Bateson and Dawkins himself. He attributed the positive reviews of the book from liberals to its authors' opposition to racism. Though he believed that its chapters on "IQ testing and similar topics" had some value, he concluded that the book was poorly written and "silly, pretentious, obscurantist and mendacious". One of the authors threatened to sue Dawkins for insinuating in his review that they were comparable to the discredited psychologist Cyril Burt for their dedication to ideology over facts.

=== Academic journals ===
Not in Our Genes received positive reviews from the biologist Peter Medawar in Nature, the geneticist Alan Emery in Trends in Neurosciences, and T. Benton in The Sociological Review, the biologist Franz M. Wuketits in the Journal of Social and Biological Structures, and a mixed review from the anthropologist Vernon Reynolds in Ethnic and Racial Studies. The book was also reviewed by Howard L. Kaye in Society.

Medawar described the book as a well-written and "in the main convincing rebuttal of a variety of determinist ideologies that have come to acquire the status of a public nuisance in biology and sociology." He endorsed its authors' criticism of IQ testing and their argument that determinism is an expression of conservative ideology. However, he was less satisfied by their criticism of reductionism, writing that despite its shortcomings reductive analysis was "the most successful research stratagem ever devised in science." He argued that it was also the way of understanding the world that made it easiest to see how it could be changed, something left-wing writers such as the authors of Not in Our Genes should appreciate. Emery welcomed the book as a refreshing attempt to create a more balanced view of the relevance of genetics to human behavior.

Benton described the book as an "immense achievement", accessible to a large audience. He admired the historical survey of biological determinism and reductionism and the philosophical discussion of their dialectical alternative, and praised their discussions of IQ testing, biological determinist defences of patriarchy, psychiatry, schizophrenia, and sociobiology. He believed that they exposed the logical and conceptual problems of measuring intelligence and identifying schizophrenia as a unitary disorder, as well as problems in the methodologies of heritability studies, including the assumption that "the determinants of any characteristic can be analysed as of two, separable kinds, heredity and environment, and that it makes sense to ask what proportion of each went into the making of the particular characteristic." He wrote that they dealt "selectively (and probably appropriately) with the work of Wilson and Dawkins". However, he believed that they did not have a fully developed alternative to biological and cultural determinism, questioned whether they had a view different from cultural determinism, and noted that while they treated sociobiology as a form of genetic determinism, the main sociobiological writers had become "more sophisticated and qualified in their assumptions." He criticized them for using quotations selectively to argue that sociobiology is still an unqualified form of genetic determinism, and for equating "biological determinism and political reaction", noting that religious fundamentalists wanted to outlaw the teaching of evolutionary theory, and some progressive thinkers accepted that biological processes shape personality.

Wuketits described the book as "concise and well written", and "more provocative than anything else written in opposition to genetic determinism and its ideological interpretation" because of its identification of sociobiology with the New Right. He considered it mistaken to view sociobiology as only an "ideological program", writing that it was primarily a scientific discipline. He expressed regret that the book would give readers not familiar with the scientific background to sociobiology the impression that it is "nothing but a dangerous pseudoscientific ideology."

Reynolds argued that because the authors dismissed biological approaches to understanding human nature, they invalidated their own claims about human nature, reducing them from scientific to political statements. He maintained instead that a single "committed political position" cannot be used to criticize science, and that determining to what extent scientific claims are political requires consideration of all political positions. He wrote that the authors provided a dubious description of science, making it sound like a "right wing political movement", noting that their credentials as scientists suggested that their politicized view of science was incorrect. However, he considered them right to claim that the arguments of sociobiology were only "speculative suggestions" and that it was unfortunate if "the fascist right" adopted them as "scientific validation of its ideology", and that some scientific work, such as "IQ testing", is politicized science, and credited them with showing that "a good many branches of the science of human nature all revolve around the problem of inequality" and "mostly validate it."

== Criticism ==
The psychologist David P. Barash criticized Lewontin et al. for unfairly linking sociobiology with "racist eugenics and misguided Social Darwinism." Dawkins accused the authors of misquoting his comment on genes, "they created us, body and mind", by altering "created" to "control". He maintained that genes do not control people in the way that "genetic determinism" suggests and accused Lewontin et al. of failing to understand that genes can "exert a statistical influence on human behavior" but that "this influence can be modified, overridden or reversed by other influences."

The biologist Dean Hamer described Not in Our Genes as "a political rather than a scientific book". He expressed his disagreement with its politics. Nevertheless, Hamer commented that it taught him that the genetics of behavior is an emotionally and politically charged topic, especially where it concerns sexuality, and helped motivate him to change fields from metallothionein research to the genetics of homosexuality. The philosopher Daniel Dennett criticized Lewontin et al.′s account of reductionism, calling it "idiosyncratic". He also criticized their claim that memes involve a Cartesian view of the mind, arguing that memes are "a key (central but optional) ingredient in the best alternatives to Cartesian models", and accused them of being willing to use unscrupulous tactics to criticize people they considered determinists.

The author Richard Webster considered Not in Our Genes, "more subtle and valuable than the Marxism which frequently informs it". Rose commented that he and his co-authors in the book presented a critique of reductionism that was "systematic and based upon a coherent philosophical and political analysis which sees modern science as the inheritor of nineteenth-century mechanical materialism, itself tightly linked ideologically to a particular phase of the development of industrial capitalism." Writing with the sociologist Hilary Rose, he noted that Not in Our Genes was one of a number of books that criticized sociobiology. Hilary Rose suggested that Not in Our Genes had been misread by critics, and credited its authors with offering "an alternative theory to biological determinism more robust than the rather weak concept of interaction between nature and nurture".

The historian of science Roger Smith described Not in Our Genes as an accessible critique of sociobiology. The psychologist Steven Pinker criticized Lewontin et al. for engaging in "innuendos about Donald Symons's sex life" and misquoting Dawkins.

The sociologist Ullica Segerstråle suggested that Not in Our Genes, along with Gould's anti-sociobiological essays in Natural History, represented the height of the "critical attack" on sociobiology from its opponents. She noted that the book admitted that some critics of sociobiology wanted a socialist society. According to Segerstråle, Rose threatened to sue Dawkins for libel for his review; the evolutionary biologist W. D. Hamilton and other scientists made efforts to protect Dawkins, including seeking help from Segerstråle. She suggested that Rose's reaction to Dawkins's review may have been influenced by the fact that New Scientist had expected Dawkins to write a negative and Bateson a positive review for the magazine, while both reviews were negative.

The behavioral ecologist John Alcock argued that while Lewontin et al. were correct to maintain that no genes for social behavior had been identified as of 1984, it was nevertheless clear that thousands of genes are expressed in human brain cells and must be relevant to human behavior. Pinker accused Lewontin et al. of using words such as "determinism" and "reductionism" as "vague terms of abuse", and of misrepresenting scientists such as Wilson and Dawkins, falsely ascribing ridiculous beliefs to them. He saw them and other critics of "determinism" as misusing the term by using it to refer to the idea that people simply have a tendency to behave in a certain fashion. Pinker endorsed Dawkins's review. He noted that Lewontin and Rose were both "reductionist biologists", and attributed their rejection of the idea of human nature to their Marxism.

== See also ==
- Lysenkoism
- Marxist philosophy
- Socialism
