= British Society for Social Responsibility in Science =

The British Society for Social Responsibility in Science (BSSRS) was a science movement most active in the 1970s. The main aims of the BSSRS was to raise awareness of the social responsibilities of scientists, the political aspects of science and technology, and to create an informed public. The organisation was concerned with the misuse of science and technological innovation and the impact on the environment, both for the health of workers and wider society.

== Creation ==
BSSRS was formed in 1968 in opposition to university research on chemical and biological weapons, and supported by 83 distinguished scientists, including William Bragg, Francis Crick, Julian Huxley and Bertrand Russell.

The Society was inaugurated at a meeting, sponsored by 64 Fellows of the Royal Society, and held in the Society on 19 April 1969. It was attended by more than 300, mostly UK, scientists and engineers. Nobel Laureate Professor Maurice Wilkins was the founding President.

A provisional committee was elected at the April 1969 meeting, ahead of the first general meeting in November 1969. At the November meeting, the Society's Secretary Dr R L Smith, reported on the activities of the new Society, including the creation of a regular newsletter by the Society, the creation of a number of local societies and the organising of regular public meetings in London. By the time of that meeting, membership had "grown to nearly 1,000": in 1971, membership was around 2500 and 12 local societies had been created.

At the November 1969 meeting, Smith also reported on the establishment by BSSRS of an investigative team (of five medical and social scientists) who went to Northern Ireland to investigate the use in August of CS gas as a "riot control agent".

The November 1969 meeting also established BSSRS's constitution and its aims and activities.

== Organisation ==
BSSRS grew in the early 1970s: it received a grant from the Joseph Rowntree Foundation, opened an office in Poland Street and employed David Dickson as its General Secretary (the same building housed an early iteration of Friends of the Earth). Hugh Saddler took over this role in 1973. BSSRS also garnered attention through letters from its members to national newspapers and increasingly coverage in science publications such as New Scientist and Nature.

BSSRS published a newsletter between 1969 and 1972, when it grew into a bi-monthly magazine, Science for People. The second edition of the magazine was a special on women and later issues often included articles "surrounding the intersection between science and gender". Science for People also illustrated BSSRS's focus on pacifism and also on newer topics of debate such as environmentalism. In 1976, three BSSRS members and contributors to Science for People - Charlie Clutterbuck, Alan Dalton and Tony Fletcher - began Hazards, an occupational safety and health magazine, in response to the introduction of the Health and Safety at Work etc. Act 1974.

From 1969 onwards, local BSSRS societies organised study groups and events. For example, the branch in Edinburgh was part of a teach-in on pollution in March 1970 and the Cambridge branch organised discussions and activities around race and intelligence in the summer of 1970, refuting the recently published work of Arthur Jensen.

BSSRS had close connections to other organisations such as The Campaign for Nuclear Disarmament (CND), Scientists against the Bomb and Radical Statistics. Its members included staff from universities such as the Open University and the London School of Economics (LSE). Active members of BSSRS included Eric Burhop, Tom Kibble, Jerome Ravetz, Jill Purce, Jonathan Rosenhead, Steven Rose, Hilary Rose and Felix Pirani.

== Campaigns ==
At a meeting of the British Science Association (BSA) in Durham in 1970, a group of BSSRS activists - inspired by actions earlier in the year at the American Association for the Advancement of Science (AAAS) - raised political issues under a banner of "Science is not neutral". They disrupted the meeting, claiming the BSA served a "propagandist function", and staged a mid-conference teach-in. The group also organised for a radical street theatre group to act out the effects of biological and chemical warfare as attendees left the auditorium following the BSA Presidential Address. However, the actions in Durham were described by one prominent member of BSSRS as "perhaps not meeting the approval of all members".

From the investigation of the use of CS gas in 1969, BSSRS developed a strong interest in Northern Ireland and the other "methods used to contain separatist protests", such as rubber bullets and water cannon and "interrogation in depth"., This led to BSSRS publishing in 1974 the pamphlet The New Technology of Repression: Lessons from Ireland.

BSSRS also carried out investigations with grassroots communities: for example, working in 1972 with local residents in Battersea, London to uncover the origins of the "Battersea Smell" (which locals belied to be caused by one or two local factories). BSSRS worked with residents to carry out a survey into the smell, which in turn developed press coverage which led to Battersea council health committee investigating one of the local factories (Garton Sons and Co, a glucose manufacturer). After which, the smell improved.

== Decline ==
BSSRS came to an end in the early 1990s. Reasons given have included the fading of the radical movement in the UK during the 1980s and members leaving and not being replaced.

== Publications ==
As well as issues of Science for People BSSRS also published a range of pamphlets and books, including:

- Fuller, Watson, British Society for Social Responsibility in Science (ed.) (1971). The Social impact of modern biology: International Conference held in London on 26–28 November 1970. London,: Routledge and K. Paul. 1971. ISBN 0-7100-6676-7. OCLC 227435.
- British Society for Social Responsibility in Science (1972). The environment - a radical agenda. [London]: B.S.S.R.S. ISBN 0-9502541-0-X. OCLC 596458.
- Dalton, Alan J. P. (1975). Oil : a workers' guide to the health hazards and how to fight them. British Society for Social Responsibility in Science: London. ISBN 0-9502541-4-2. OCLC 16489307.
- Fletcher, Tony (1975). Noise : fighting the most widespread industrial disease. British Society for Social Responsibility in Science. London. ISBN 0-9502541-1-8. OCLC 16486197.
- British Society for Social Responsibility in Science (1977). Ecology : a critical reading guide. BSSRS/SCANUS. OCLC 499245068
- Dalton, Alan J. P. (1977) Vibration : a workers' guide to the health hazards of vibration and their prevention. British Society for Social Responsibility and Science. London. OCLC 81763804
- McMorrow, John, British Society for Social Responsibility in Science (1977). Killer dust on the tube [the health hazard of asbestos]. British Society for Social Responsibility and Science. London. OCLC 24709743.
- British Society for Social Responsibility and Science (1978) Our daily bread : who makes the dough. British Society for Social Responsibility and Science. London. OCLC 5407180.
- Dalton, Alan J. R. British Society for Social Responsibility and Science (1979) Asbestos killer dust : a worker/community guide; how to fight the hazards of asbestos and its substitute. British Society for Social Responsibility and Science. London. ISBN 978-0-9502541-3-5. OCLC 872738959
- British Society for Social Responsibility in Science (1979). Science under capitalism. British Society for Social Responsibility in Science, London. OCLC 220295101.
- British Society for Social Responsibility and Science (1980) Nuclear power : the rigged debate. British Society for Social Responsibility and Science. London. OCLC 621477636.
- British Society for Social Responsibility and Science (1982) Reading between the numbers : a critical guide to educational research. British Society for Social Responsibility in Science Radical Statistics Education Group, London. OCLC 500000286.
- British Society for Social Responsibility and Science (1982) Science on our side : a new socialist agenda for science, technology and medicine. British Society for Social Responsibility and Science. London. ISBN 978-0-946285-01-3 OCLC 220836640.
- British Society for Social Responsibility in Science, Research and Monitoring of Police Equipment and Training (1985) TechnoCop : new police technologies, Free Association Books, London. ISBN 978-0-946960-25-5. OCLC 12516932.
- Evans, Rob, British Society for Social Responsibility in Science, (c.1990) Universities and the bomb : the funding of research in universities during the 1980s by the Atomic Weapons Establishment at Aldermaston. British Society for Social Responsibility in Science, London. OCLC 85077881

== Archives ==
The BSSRS archive is held at Wellcome Collection (ref no: SA/BSR).

A BSSRS online archive has been created by former members.

== See also ==
- Politicization of science
- Sociobiology Study Group
- Science for the People
- New World Agriculture and Ecology Group
