= Palestinian Campaign for the Academic and Cultural Boycott of Israel =

Political campaign, established 2004

The Palestinian Campaign for the Academic and Cultural Boycott of Israel (PACBI) was launched in April 2004 by a group of Palestinian academics and intellectuals in Ramallah, in the West Bank. PACBI is part of the Boycott, Divestment and Sanctions (BDS) campaign. The campaign calls for BDS activities against Israel to put international pressure on Israel, in this case against Israeli academic or cultural institutions, all of which are said by PACBI to be implicated in the perpetuation of Israeli occupation, in order to achieve BDS goals. The goal of the proposed academic and cultural boycotts is to isolate Israel in order to force a change in Israel's policies towards the Palestinians, which proponents argue are discriminatory and oppressive, including oppressing the academic freedom of Palestinians.

One of its founders was Omar Barghouti, who is also a co-founder of the BDS campaign. PACBI is a member of the Palestinian BDS National Committee (BNC).

== History ==
PACBI was launched in Ramallah in April 2004 by a group of Palestinian academics and intellectuals, as part of the international BDS campaign. The Campaign built on a call for an economic, cultural and academic boycott of Israel issued in August 2002 and a statement made by Palestinian academics and intellectuals in the occupied territories and in the Diaspora calling for a boycott of Israeli academic institutions in October 2003. The Campaign was inspired by people who supported the struggle to abolish apartheid in South Africa through diverse forms of boycott.

In 2005, PACBI worked with the British Committee for the Universities of Palestine (BRICUP) which lobbied the Association of University Teachers (AUT) to adopt an academic boycott of Israeli universities.

== Views ==
PACBI argues that "Israel's colonial oppression of the Palestinian people comprises:"

- denial of its responsibility for the Nakba—in particular the waves of ethnic cleansing and dispossession that created the Palestinian refugee problem—and therefore refusal to accept the inalienable rights of the refugees and displaced stipulated in and protected by international law;
- military occupation and colonization of the West Bank (including East Jerusalem) and Gaza since 1967, in violation of international law and UN resolutions;
- the entrenched system of racial discrimination and segregation against the Palestinian citizens of Israel, which resembles the defunct apartheid system in South Africa to form an Israeli apartheid;

PACBI's supporters believe that a boycott of Israeli academic and cultural institutions will contribute towards the dismantling of "Israel's occupation, colonization and system of apartheid".

== Activities ==
In July 2009, PACBI called for the boycott of a proposed concert in Ramallah by Jewish Canadian singer-songwriter Leonard Cohen who had entertained Israeli troops for three months during the Yom Kippur War and expressed a desire to be drafted. PACBI opposed the concert because it would be held two days after Cohen performed in Israel. The organizer of the event cancelled the concert in Ramallah because it was becoming too politicized.

In February 2023, the PACBI Twitter account posted what it claimed was a photograph of the Tantura Massacre, accompanying a demand that the European Molecular Biology Organization relocate workshops from "apartheid Israel." It was subsequently discovered that the photo depicted corpses arranged for mass burial in the Nordhausen concentration camp.

In January 2024, PACBI criticized the Standing Together movement, saying it was a "normalization outfit that seeks to distract from and whitewash Israel's ongoing genocide in Gaza".

In March 2024, PACBI joined the calls to boycott the Israeli participation in the Eurovision Song Contest 2024 during the Gaza war, accusing the country of pinkwashing, whitewashing and artwashing its "ongoing genocide" against Palestinians.

PACBI called for a boycott of Disney's 2025 live action remake of Snow White due to its star Gal Gadot's support for Israel.

In March 2025, PACBI criticized the 2024 Palestinian documentary film, No Other Land, stating, "Palestinians do not need validation, legitimation or permission from Israelis to narrate our history, our present, our experiences, our dreams, and our resistance." The film's production was led by both Israelis and Palestinians.

On 12 May 2025, PACI called for the boycott of Superstruct Entertainment festivals over the role of its owner, KKR, in Israel.

== See also ==
- Boycott, Divestment and Sanctions
- Boycotts of Israel
- Academic boycott of Israel
- Reactions to Boycott, Divestment and Sanctions
