= Jonathan Rosenhead =

British mathematician, operational researcher and Labour Party activist

Jonathan Vivian Rosenhead (born 21 September 1938) is a British mathematician, operational researcher and Labour Party activist.

== Early life and career ==
Jonathan Rosenhead is the son of mathematician Louis Rosenhead. He studied at St John's College, Cambridge, where he received a B.A. degree in mathematics in 1959. He continued his studies at University College London where he received an M.Sc. degree in statistics in 1961, and an M.A. from Cambridge in 1963. He worked as an operational researcher at United Steel Companies in Sheffield in 1961-63 and at Science in General Management Ltd. (SIGMA) in Croydon in 1963–66 before returning to the academic world.

== Academic career ==
Rosenhead spent 1966–67 at the Wharton School of the University of Pennsylvania and its Management Science Centre, where Russell L. Ackoff was professor. In 1967, he joined the London School of Economics as a lecturer in operational research. He became a senior lecturer in 1981 and professor of operational research in 1987. He retired in 2003.

Within operational research (OR), Rosenhead is primarily associated with the development of "soft OR" from the late 1970s, which resulted in the development of a number of new OR methods. He was the editor of the first book to gather a number of problem structuring methods within one volume, Rational analysis for a problematic world, published in 1989.

He was president of the Operational Research Society in 1986–87.

== Political activism ==
Rosenhead was a Labour Party candidate for Kensington South at the 1966 general election. His candidacy was endorsed by notable local residents, including playwright Keith Waterhouse, designer Misha Black, writer Baroness Stocks, architect Sir Hugh Casson, writer Brigid Brophy and novelist Lord Snow. However, Rosenhead came a distant second to the Conservatives, who held the seat with a large majority.

He was active in the British Society for Social Responsibility in Science over a 20-year period, including a stint as chair of the society. His political activities has included being chairman of the British Committee for the Universities of Palestine (BRICUP) and being information officer for Jewish Voice for Labour.

Rosenhead was involved in the campaign against South African apartheid. He was arrested at a May 1972 demonstration against the English rugby team which was departing for a tour in South Africa. He was convicted of a public order offence and fined. In 2020, Rosenhead learned that a fellow protester, who was also arrested at the demonstration, was an undercover police officer working in the Special Demonstration Squad. The fact that the police had told neither the defence nor the court about the officer made the convictions a miscarriage of justice. Rosenhead and several others had their convictions quashed in 2023.

In May 2020, Rosenhead was one of ten Labour Party members identified in dossiers which the shadow Secretary of State for Communities and Local Government Steve Reed submitted to the party's Governance and Legal Unit, calling for them to be investigated for engaging in antisemitic conduct. The subsequent investigation found that he had no case to answer.
