= Steven Rose =

English neuroscientist (1938–2025)

- Born: Steven Peter Russell Rose; 4 July 1938; London, England
- Died: 9 July 2025 (aged 87)
- Education: King's College, Cambridge; Institute of Psychiatry, Psychology and Neuroscience
- Known for: Criticism of genetic determinism
- Spouse: Hilary Rose (m. 1961)
- Children: Simon and Ben
- Scientific career
- Fields: Neuroscience
- Institutions: The Open University; Gresham College, London
- Thesis: Biochemical consequence of L-DOPA administration to animals: implications for the treatment of Parkinson's disease (1961)

Steven Peter Russell Rose (4 July 1938 – 9 July 2025) was an English neuroscientist, author and social commentator. He was a professor of biology and neurobiology at the Open University and Gresham College, London.

== Early life ==
Born in London, England on 4 July 1938, he was brought up as an Orthodox Jew. Rose said that he decided to become an atheist when he was eight years old. He went to a direct grant school in northwest London which operated a numerus clausus restricting the numbers of Jewish students. He studied biochemistry at King's College, Cambridge, and neurochemistry at the Institute of Psychiatry, King's College London.

== Academic career ==
Following a Fellowship at New College, Oxford, and a Medical Research Council research post, he was appointed to the professorship of biology at the newly instituted Open University in 1969. At the time he was Britain's youngest full professor and chair of the department. At the Open University he established the Brain Research Group, within which he and his colleagues investigated the biological processes involved in memory formation and treatments for Alzheimer's disease on which he published some 300 research papers and reviews. He wrote several popular science books and regularly wrote for The Guardian newspaper and the London Review of Books. From 1999 to 2002, he gave public lectures as a professor of Physick (Genetics and Society) with his wife, the feminist sociologist Hilary Rose at Gresham College, London. His work won him numerous medals and prizes including the Biochemical Society medal for communication in science and the prestigious Edinburgh Medal in 2004. His book The Making of Memory won the Rhone-Poulenc Science Book Prize in 1993.

Together with Hilary Rose he was a founder member of the British Society for Social Responsibility in Science in the 1960s, and more recently they have been instrumental in calling for a boycott of Israeli academic institutions for as long as Israel continues its occupation of the Palestinian Territories, on the grounds of Israeli academics' close relationship with the IDF. An open letter initiated by Steven and Hilary Rose, and also signed by 123 other academics was published in The Guardian on 6 April 2002. In 2004 Hilary Rose and he were the founding members of the British Committee for the Universities of Palestine.

Rose was for several years a regular panellist on BBC Radio 4's ethics debating series The Moral Maze. He was a Distinguished Supporter of Humanists UK. He was part of the Royal Society's working group producing their Brain Waves modules on the state of neuroscience and its social framing, and was a member of the Nuffield Council on Bioethics Working Party on Novel Neurotechnologies. His recent books with Hilary Rose include Alas Poor Darwin: Arguments against Evolutionary Psychology, in 2012, Genes, Cells and Brains: the Promethean promises of the new biology (Verso), described by Guardian reviewer Steven Poole as "fascinating, lucid and angry" with a "lethally impressive hit ratio", and most recently Can Neuroscience Change Our Minds? (Polity, 2016). His audio-autobiography forms part of the British Library's National Life Stories Collection of distinguished scientists. The sociologist Nikolas Rose is his younger brother. Hilary and he had two sons. He remained an atheist.

Rose was a defender of the use of animals in medical research, accepting the description of himself as a "vivisector". The issue of animal rights was debated by him and Jolyon Jenkins in the pages of New Statesman and Society.

In 2012 the British Neuroscience Association gave him a lifetime award for "Outstanding contributions to neuroscience."

== Critique of genetic determinism ==
With Richard Lewontin and Leon Kamin, Rose championed the "radical science movement". The three criticized sociobiology, evolutionary psychology, and adaptationism, most prominently in the book Not in Our Genes (1984), laying out their opposition to Sociobiology (E. O. Wilson, 1975), The Selfish Gene (Richard Dawkins, 1976), and other works promoting an evolutionary explanation for human social behaviour. Not in Our Genes described Dawkins as "the most reductionist of sociobiologists". In retort, Dawkins wrote that the book practices a straw man fallacy by distorting arguments in terms of genetics to "an idiotic travesty (that the properties of a complex whole are simply the sum of those same properties in the parts)", and accused the authors of giving "ideology priority over truth". Rose replied in the second edition of his book Lifelines. Rose wrote further works in this area: in 2000 he jointly edited with the sociologist Hilary Rose, a critique of evolutionary psychology entitled Alas, Poor Darwin: Arguments Against Evolutionary Psychology. In 2006 he wrote a paper dismissing classical heritability estimates as useful scientific measures in respect of human populations especially in the context of IQ.

Rose wrote the introduction of The Richness of Life (2007) by the prominent American paleontologist, evolutionary biologist, and historian of science, Stephen Jay Gould.

J. Richard Udry dismissed Rose's Lifelines criticisms of genetic determinism, stating they were straw men. A. J. Wells asserted that Rose created a false dichotomy between homeodynamic and neo-Darwinian explanations for human behavioural patterns, and like Udry, said that Rose's portrayal of "ultra-Darwinism" was a caricature of the views of evolutionary behaviourists. Nicholas S. Thompson lampooned Rose for suggesting behavioural geneticists were trying to rehabilitate Nazism.

== Death ==
Rose died on 9 July 2025, at the age of 87.

== Bibliography ==
Books (for selected papers see website Stevenroseonline.net)

- Chemical and Biological Warfare, 1968, Chambers Harrap Publishers, ISBN 024559485X
- Science and Society, with Hilary Rose, Penguin, 1969
- The Conscious Brain, 1973, ISBN 0-394-46066-9
- Radicalisation of Science, with Hilary Rose, 1976, Macmillan, ISBN 0333211413
- Political Economy of Science: Ideology of/in the Natural Science, Editor with Hilary Rose, 1976, Macmillan, ISBN 0333211383
- Towards a Liberatory Biology (Editor) 1981, Allison & Busby, ISBN 0850314259
- Against Biological Determinism (Editor), 1982, Schocken, ISBN 0805281126
- Not in Our Genes (With Richard Lewontin & Leon Kamin) 1984, ISBN 0-394-72888-2
- No Fire, No Thunder: Threat of Chemical and Biological Weapons, with Sean Murphy and Alistair Hay, 1984, Pluto Press, ISBN 0861047389
- The Chemistry of Life, 1991 (first published in 1966), ISBN 0-14-027273-9
- The Making of Memory, 1992, ISBN 0-593-01990-3
- Alas, Poor Darwin: Arguments against Evolutionary Psychology, with Hilary Rose, 2000, ISBN 0-609-60513-5
- Lifelines, 2005, ISBN 0-09-946863-8
- The 21st Century Brain, 2005, ISBN 0-224-06254-9
- The Future of the Brain: The Promise and Perils of Tomorrow's Neuroscience, 2005, ISBN 0-19-515420-7
- Genes, Cells and Brains: Bioscience's Promethean Promises, with Hilary Rose, 2012, Verso, ISBN 1844678814
- Can Neuroscience Change Our Minds? , with Hilary Rose, 2016, Polity, ISBN 978-0-7456-8931-9

== See also ==
- Academic boycotts of Israel
- List of British Jewish scientists
- Stephen Jay Gould
- Richard Lewontin
- Richard Levins
