= British Committee for the Universities of Palestine =

Activist organization promoting academic boycott of Israel

British Committee for Universities of Palestine
- Founded: December 2004; 21 years ago
- Founder: Hilary Rose, Steven Rose, Martha Mundy,
- Type: Non-profit activist
- Headquarters: London, United Kingdom
- Services: Promoting academic boycott of Israel
- Fields: support Palestinian universities, staff and students and oppose the Israeli occupation of Palestinian lands
- Key people: Jonathan Rosenhead, Chairman
- Website: www.bricup.org.uk

The British Committee for Universities of Palestine (BRICUP) was organized in 2004 in response to a Palestinian call for academic and cultural boycott of Israel. The idea of an academic boycott against Israel first emerged publicly in England on 6 April 2002 in an open letter to The Guardian initiated by two of the founders of BRICUP, Steven and Hilary Rose, then professors in biology at the Open University and social policy at the University of Bradford respectively, who called for a moratorium on all cultural and research links with Israel. The organization's launch was announced at a conference hosted by London University School of Oriental and African Studies in December 2004.
