= Andy Beckett =

British journalist and historian

Andy Beckett (born 1969) is a British journalist and historian. He writes for The Guardian, the London Review of Books and The New York Times magazine.

He read Modern History at Balliol College, Oxford, and journalism at the University of California, Berkeley.

== Works ==
- Pinochet in Piccadilly: Britain and Chile's Hidden History (London: Faber & Faber, 2002).
- When the Lights Went Out: Britain in the Seventies (London: Faber & Faber, 2009).
- Promised You A Miracle: Why 1980–82 Made Modern Britain (London: Allen Lane, 2015).
- The Searchers: Five Rebels, Their Dream of a Different Britain, and Their Many Enemies (London: Allen Lane, 2024).
