= Matthew Frye Jacobson =

American historian

- Title: William Robertson Coe Professor of American Studies & History

Academic background
- Education: Evergreen State College; Boston College; Brown University

Academic work
- Institutions: Yale University
- Notable works: Roots Too

Matthew Frye Jacobson is an American historian whose research concerns politics and race in all eras of American history. He is the Sterling Professor of American Studies and History and Professor of African American Studies at Yale University. From 2012 to 2013 he was president of the American Studies Association.

== Education ==
Jacobson earned a BA from Evergreen State College and an MA from Boston College. He received his doctorate in American Civilization in 1992 from Brown University.

== Works ==
- Special Sorrows: The Diasporic Imagination of Irish, Polish, and Jewish Immigrants in the United States (1995)
- Whiteness of a Different Color: European Immigrants and the Alchemy of Race (1998)
- Barbarian Virtues: The United States Encounters Foreign Peoples at Home and Abroad, 1876-1917 (2000)
- Roots Too: White Ethnic Revival in Post-Civil Rights America (2005)
- What Have They Built You to Do?: The Manchurian Candidate and Cold War America (with Gaspar González, 2006)
- The Historian’s Eye: Photography, History, and the American Present (2018)
- Dancing Down the Barricades: Sammy Davis Jr. and the Long Civil Rights Era (2023)

== Film ==
Jacobson served as the creator, writing, and lead researcher on the documentary film, A Long Way from Home: The Untold Story of Baseball’s Desegregation (Hammer & Nail Productions, 2019). The film won a Golden Telly Award for General Television Documentary.
