= Omar Barghouti =

Qatari-Palestinian activist (born 1964)

- Barghouti in 2026
- Born: 1964 (age 61–62); Qatar
- Education: Columbia University; Tel Aviv University
- Known for: Co-founder of the BDS movement
- Awards: Gandhi Peace Award

Omar Barghouti (Arabic: عمر البرغوثي, born 1964) is a Qatari-Palestinian who is a founding committee member of the Palestinian Campaign for the Academic and Cultural Boycott of Israel (PACBI) and co-founder of the Boycott, Divestment and Sanctions (BDS) movement. He received the Gandhi Peace Award in 2017.

== Biography ==
Barghouti was born in Qatar to a Palestinian family from the Barghouti family, and at a young age moved to Egypt, where he grew up. In 1982, he moved to the United States, where he lived for 11 years and earned bachelor's and master's degrees in electrical engineering from Columbia University. At Columbia, he was president of the Columbia Arab Club. In 1993, he moved to Israel following his marriage to an Israeli-Arab woman. He holds Israeli permanent residency status and lives in Acre. He holds a master's degree in philosophy (ethics) from the Tel Aviv University (TAU), and is pursuing a PhD.

In March 2017 Barghouti was arrested in Israel on suspicion of tax evasion of about $700,000, but as of June 2021 has not been charged with any offence with regard to this arrest.

== Views ==
Barghouti's views align strongly with those of the BDS movement which he co-founded.

=== One-state solution ===
Barghouti opposes the two-state solution because he doesn't believe a Palestinian state is viable and would not resolve the "fundamental injustices" that has been brought upon the Palestinians. He instead supports a one-state solution encompassing all of what is now Israel and the Palestinian territories, in which these will be replaced by a "secular, democratic state... offering unequivocal equality in citizenship and individual and communal rights both to Palestinians (refugees included) and to Israeli Jews". Barghouti supports a state of affairs that would allow Palestinian refugees to return to this state, which would have a "transparent and nondiscriminatory immigration policy."

Barghouti rejects the idea of a binational state, stating that "the binational model assumes that there are two nations with equal and competing moral claims to the land, and therefore we have to accommodate both national rights." Instead, Barghouti argues that a single, secular state with equal rights for Jews and Palestinians is the only way to reconcile "the inalienable, UN-sanctioned rights of the indigenous people of Palestine to self-determination, repatriation, and equality" with the "acquired rights of Israeli Jews to coexist — as equals, not colonial masters — in the land of Palestine."

=== Palestinian Authority ===
Barghouti is a vocal critic of the Palestinian Authority, which he sees as a tool for Israeli oppression:

In the West Bank you have a largely obedient Palestinian Authority (PA) that acts mainly as a subcontractor for the Israeli occupation, serving its "security" needs and relieving it of its civic burdens of running education, health, sanitation, ...

He furthermore accuses Palestinian leaders for being self-serving and for effectively having surrendered the Palestinian right of return:

Palestinian officials, lacking a democratic mandate and running after the trappings of power, narrow economic interests, and privilege, have through years of a US-Israeli designed and managed “peace process” effectively surrendered the right of return as it is defined by the UN; accepted Israel’s occupation and colonization of key parts of the West Bank, including in East Jerusalem; expunged the 1948 Palestinians, who are Israeli citizens, from the very definition of the Palestinian people, indirectly legitimizing Israeli apartheid; forsaken the moral high ground by accepting a symmetry between the "claims of both sides;" and played along Israel’s public relations campaign of portraying its colonial conflict with the Palestinian people as merely one over some disputed land.

According to Barghouti, they are "unelected and unrepresentative" without any legitimacy from the Palestinian people.

=== Israel ===
Barghouti has consistently described Israel as an apartheid state, saying: "From now on, it will be acceptable to compare Israel's apartheid system to its South African predecessor. As a consequence, proposing practical measures to punish Israeli institutions for their role in the racist and colonial policies of their state will no longer be considered beyond the pale." Also: "Characterising Israel's legalised system of discrimination as apartheid – as was done by Tutu, Jimmy Carter and even a former Israeli attorney general – does not equate Israel with South Africa. No two oppressive regimes are identical. Rather, it asserts that Israel's bestowal of rights and privileges according to ethnic and religious criteria fits the UN-adopted definition of apartheid." He refers to Israeli practices using comparisons to Nazi Germany: "Many of the methods of collective and individual “punishment” meted out to Palestinian civilians at the hands of young, racist, often sadistic and ever impervious Israeli soldiers at the hundreds of checkpoints littering the occupied Palestinian territories are reminiscent of common Nazi practices against the Jews." He believes that "Israeli society is shifting very far to the right, with ethnic cleansing becoming a mainstream term that's used in academia, in the media, in parliament, in conferences."

=== Antisemitism ===
Barghouti has said he rejects all forms of racism, including antisemitism, and has rejected charges that BDS is racist, comparing it to the KKK accusing MLK or Rosa Parks of racism. He has said that Israel's allegation of antisemitism in the BDS movement is hypocritical.

Barghouti has also supported a statement that disavowed antisemitism in the Palestinian solidarity movement.

=== Dialogue and the "peace process" ===
Barghouti is skeptical to the "peace process" which he in writing often puts in quotes. He does not believe that dialogue with Israel or the Israelis will end the oppression of Palestinians:

The main reason is because it’s morally flawed and based on the false premise that this so-called conflict is mainly due to mutual hatred and, therefore, you need some kind of therapy or dialogue between those two equivalent, symmetric, warring parties. Put them in a room, force them to talk to one another, then they will fall in love, the hatred will go away and you will have your Romeo and Juliet story. Of course, this is deceitful and morally very corrupt because the conflict is a colonial conflict — it’s not a domestic dispute between a husband and wife — it’s a colonial conflict based on ethnic cleansing, racism, colonialism and apartheid. Without taking away the roots of the conflict you cannot have any coexistence, at least not ethical coexistence.

Barghouti believes that Palestinians who engage with Israelis in intellectual debates and artistic partnerships in the spirit of inter-cultural dialogue, decontextualized from the political economy of enforced population expulsion and territorial occupation, are "guilty of moral blindness and political shortsightedness." In response, Samir El-Youssef states that "Barghouti's 'true peace based on justice' is that Israel must be punished, brought down to its knees before a Palestinian is allowed to greet an Israeli in the street". He stated that ending the Israeli occupation in the West Bank will not end the BDS movement actions—since the majority of Palestinians are refugees who live in exile and have a right to return. Barghouti has stated that he "considers violence targeting noncombatants as illegal and immoral", but according to the New York Times he also believes Palestinian resistance to Israeli repression, including through armed struggle, is a legitimate right. He did not answer when asked if he condemned violence against Israeli soldiers.

== Israeli government intimidation ==
In March 2016, at an anti-BDS conference in Jerusalem, several Israeli ministers made threatening remarks directed against Barghouti and other BDS leaders. Israel Katz, Israeli Minister of Transport, Intelligence and Atomic Energy called on Israel to engage in "targeted civil eliminations" of BDS leaders. The expression puns on the Hebrew word for targeted assassinations. Gilad Erdan, Minister of Public Security, Strategic Affairs and Minister of Information called for BDS leaders to "pay the price" for their work, but clarified that he did not mean physical harm. Aryeh Deri, Minister of Interior, said that he is considering revoking Barghouti's permanent residency in Israel.

In response, Amnesty International in April issued a statement expressing its concern about "the safety and liberty of Palestinian human rights defender Omar Barghouti, and other Boycott, Divestment and Sanctions (BDS) activists, following calls alluding to threats, including of physical harm and deprivation of basic rights, made by Israeli ministers".

== Travel restrictions ==
In 2016, the Israeli Interior Ministry refused to renew his travel permit, limiting his ability to travel abroad, and informed him that due to evidence of his "center of life" being in the West Bank, his permanent residency rights were under review. In March 2016, Israeli Interior Minister Aryeh Deri was quoted as saying: "I received information that his life is in Ramallah and he is using his resident status to travel all over the world in order to operate against Israel in the most serious manner. He was given rights similar to those of a citizen and he took advantage of our enlightened state to portray us as the most horrible state in the world." In an email to Haaretz, Barghouti wrote: "Refusing to renew my travel document now is therefore clearly political...It does not just deny me my freedom of movement. It is seen by legal experts as a first step toward revoking my permanent residency, a clearly political and vindictive measure that has no legal basis." Due to the travel restrictions, Barghouti could not be physically present at a 2016 conference at Stanford University about the BDS movement. Nevertheless, on April 27, 2016, he spoke at the conference over a Skype connection from Israel.

In April 2017, an Israeli court temporarily lifted Barghouti's travel ban. Subsequently, Barghouti traveled to the United States where he received the Gandhi Peace Award, presented at a ceremony held at Yale University. Because of the controversy created, Yale distanced itself from the award.

In February 2019, Amnesty requested Israel to "end the arbitrary travel ban" on Barghouti. The organization argued that he was under a de facto travel ban as the Israeli authorities have failed to renew his travel document.

== Criticism ==
Barghouti published an opinion piece supporting the Boycott, Divestment and Sanctions movement in the New York Daily News in February 2013. Soon after, the Daily News published an editorial by one of the speakers at a Brooklyn College panel discussing the BDS movement. The speaker wrote that Barghouti is "skilled as a propagandist" and that "he piles falsehood upon falsehood to present Israel as relentlessly oppressing the Palestinians in violation of human decency, and to hold Israel exclusively responsible for the ills afflicting them." The speaker said that Barghouti wants a "secular, democratic state built on an influx of Arabs who come to dominate the population and vote an end to Israel as the Jewish nation. That, ultimately, is the nefarious truth behind his libels."

Although Barghouti lobbies for a worldwide economic, cultural and academic boycott of Israel, Barghouti himself has studied at an Israeli university. When asked about it, Barghouti commented: "my studies at Tel Aviv University are a personal matter and I have no interest in commenting." When asked about his attendance at an Israeli university in a 2015 interview with the Associated Press, Barghouti said Palestinians "cannot possibly observe the same boycott guidelines as asked of internationals" and that "indigenous population" is entitled to all services they can get from the system.

== Publications ==
- Barghouti, Omar (2010). Boycott, désinvestissement, sanctions: BDS contre l'apartheid et l'occupation de la Palestine. La fabrique. ISBN 978-2-35872-103-5.
- Barghouti, Omar (2011). Boycott, Divestment, Sanctions: The Global Struggle for Palestinian Rights. Haymarket Books. ISBN 978-1-60846-114-1.
- Barghouti, Omar; Klein, Naomi; Ilan, Pappé; Zizek, Slavoj; Alexandrowicz, Ra'Anan (2012). The Case for Sanctions Against Israel. Verso. ISBN 978-1-84467-450-3.

== See also ==
- Academic boycotts of Israel
- Boycott, Divestment and Sanctions
