= Hilary Rose (sociologist) =

British sociologist

- Born: Hilary Ann Rose; 1935 (age 90–91)
- Education: London School of Economics
- Occupation: Sociologist
- Spouse: Steven Rose (m. 1961)
- Children: 2 sons

Hilary Ann Rose (born 1935) is a British sociologist.

== Biography ==
She was born Hilary Ann Channel. During World War II, she was evacuated from London with her mother and brother. In 1940, they were sent to Weymouth, Dorset. The same year, the French army was defeated, and many evacuated troops took shelter in Weymouth. Exhausted soldiers slept on the pavements and the luckier ones on straw in the requisitioned schools. The children, with no school to attend, mostly watched the war, fascinated but sometimes terrified. The authorities soon despatched the evacuees to safer places. Eventually, her mother found a home in Framlingham, her family home. Like Weymouth, it was not very safe, being surrounded by US airbases. Returning to London in 1945, she was admitted to an elite girls' day school, but its snobbery and authoritarianism alienated her.

Women from her lower-middle-class background rarely went to university in the 1950s, and in consequence it was not until personal tragedy intervened that she did. She married young (married name: Chantler), and soon became a mother. Her husband died in the last year of the polio epidemics in 1958. The support of friends helped her to rethink the issue of going to university. She applied and was admitted to the London School of Economics in 1959 to study sociology with two key interests: the sociology of social policy – not least because as a widowed mother she had been dependent on the Welfare State – and the sociology of science because as an activist in CND, she could make no sense of the ideology of "science is progress" (including social progress) and the bombing of Hiroshima and Nagasaki. These have remained her two interests throughout her academic career. She was the second chair of the Young Fabians and the first female chair.

== Work ==
Rose has published extensively in the sociology of science from a feminist perspective and has held numerous appointments in the UK, the US, Australia, Austria, Norway, Finland and at the Swedish Collegium for Advanced Study in Uppsala, Sweden. She is visiting research professor of sociology at the London School of Economics and professor emerita of Social Policy at the University of Bradford. She was the Gresham Professor of Physic between 1999 and 2002. In 1997, she was awarded an honorary doctorate by the Faculty of Social Sciences at Uppsala University, Sweden for her contribution to the feminist sociology of science. In 2001, her book Love, Power and Knowledge: Towards a Feminist Transformation of the Sciences was listed one of the "101 Best Books of the 20th Century" published by the Portuguese Ministry of Culture. She collaborated for a number of years with the European Commission research division on mainstreaming women scientists in the European research system.

Together with neuroscientist Steven Rose, to whom she was married, she gave a three-year lecture series on "Genetics and Society" as joint Professors of Physics at Gresham College, London. One of the products of this collaboration was the edited book Alas Poor Darwin: Arguments Against Evolutionary Psychology, published in 2000. Her most recent books, with Steven Rose, are Genes, Cells and Brains: The Promethean Promises of the New Biology (Verso, 2012) and Can Neuroscience Change Our Minds? (Polity, 2016).

She was a founder member of the British Society for Social Responsibility in Science in the 1960s, and more recently has been instrumental in calling for a boycott of Israeli academic institutions for as long as Israel continues its occupation of the Palestinian Territories, on the grounds of Israeli academics' close relationship with the IDF. An open letter, initiated by Hilary Rose and Steven Rose, and also signed by 123 other academics, was published in The Guardian on 6 April 2002. In 2004, Hilary Rose was one of the founding members of the British Committee for the Universities of Palestine, a key part of the academic boycott movement.

Rose has co-authored or co-edited 13 books and over 150 articles.

== Selected bibliography ==
=== Books ===
- Can Neuroscience Change Our Minds? (with Steven Rose), 2016, Polity, ISBN 978-0-7456-8931-9
- Genes, Cells and Brains: The Promethean Promises of the New Biology (with Steven Rose), Verso, 2013 ISBN 9781844678815
- The commodification of bioinformation: The Icelandic Health Sector Data Base (monograph), The Wellcome Trust, Public Interest, 2001
- Alas, Poor Darwin: Escaping Evolutionary Psychology (with Steven Rose, editors), Cape, 2000.
- Science and Society (with Steven Rose), Allen Lane, 1969. Penguin, 1970.
- Love, Power and Knowledge: Towards a Feminist Transformation of the Sciences, Polity Press, 1994, ISBN 0-7456-1001-3'
- The Housing Problem, Heinemann, 1983
- The Political Economy of Science and The Radicalisation of Science 2 vols (ed. with Steven Rose), Macmillan, 1976
- Rights, participation and conflict (pamphlet), Child Poverty Action Group, 1970

=== Papers ===
- Rose, Hilary; Steven Rose (2009). "The Changing Face of Human Nature". Daedalus. 138 (3): 7–20. doi:10.1162/daed.2009.138.3.7. JSTOR 40543984. S2CID 57558382.
- "Eugenics and Genetics: The Conjoint Twins". New Formations, Vol. 60, pp. 13–26, Winter 2006–2007
- "Risk, Trust and Scepticism in the Age of the New Genetics" in B. Adams, U. Beck and J. Loon (eds), Risk Theory Revisited, Sage, 2000
- "Autogenesis. Open Letter". Canadian Journal of Writing and Theory, 2000. pp. 2–22
- Red Scientist: Two Strands from a Life in Three Colours (with Steven Rose) in B. Swann and F. Aprahamian (eds), J.D. Bernal: a Life in Science and Politics, Verso, 1999
- Rose, Hilary (1996). "My Enemy's Enemy Is, Only Perhaps, My Friend". Social Text (46/47): 61–80. doi:10.2307/466844. JSTOR 466844.
- "Disembodied Knowledge: Making Sense of Biomedical Science" (with Helen Lambert) in A. Irvin and B. Wynne (eds), Misunderstanding Science: The Public Reconstruction of Science and Technology, Cambridge University Press, 1996
- "Learning from the New Priesthood and the Shrieking Sisterhood: Debating the Life Sciences in Victorian England" in R Hubbard and L Birke (eds), Reinventing Biology, Indiana University Press, 1995
- "Mutual Care but Differential Esteem: Caring between older couples" in S. Arber and J. Ginn (eds), Connecting Gender and Ageing: Sociological Approaches to Gender and Later Life, Open University Press, 1995
- "Gendered Reflexions on the Laboratory in Medicine" in A. Cunningham and P. Williams (eds), The Laboratory Revolution in Medicine, Cambridge University Press, 1992
- "Victorian Values in the Test-Tube: The Politics of Reproduction Science and Technology" in M. Stanworth (ed.), Gender, Motherhood and Medicine, Polity, 1987
- Rose, Hilary (1983). "Hand, Brain, and Heart: A Feminist Epistemology for the Natural Sciences". Signs: Journal of Women in Culture and Society. 9: 73–90. doi:10.1086/494025. S2CID 144810707.
- "Victorian values in the test-tube: the politics of reproduction science an technology" in Michelle Stanworth (ed) Gender, Motherhood and Medicine, Polity, pp. 151–173, 1987
- Rose, Hilary (1988). "Dreaming the Future". Hypatia. 3: 119–137. doi:10.1111/j.1527-2001.1988.tb00059.x.
- Rose, Hilary (1981). "Rereading Titmuss: The Sexual Division of Welfare". Journal of Social Policy. 10 (4): 477–501. doi:10.1017/S0047279400001549.
- "Hyper-Reflexivity: a new danger for the counter-movements" in H. Nowotny and H. Rose (eds), Countermovements in the Sciences, Yearbook of the Sociology of Science, Reidel, 1979
- "Radical Science and its Enemies" (with Steven Rose) in R. Miliband and J. Saville (eds), The Socialist Register, Merlin Press, 1979
- Rose, Hilary (1978). "In practice supported, in theory denied: An account of an invisible urban movement". International Journal of Urban and Regional Research. 2 (1–3): 521–537. doi:10.1111/j.1468-2427.1978.tb00765.x.
- "Women's liberation, reproduction and the technological fix" (with J. Hanmer) in D. Barker and A. Allen (eds), Sexual Divisions and Society: process and change, Tavistock, pp. 199–223
- "Bread and Justice: the National Welfare Rights Movement" in P. Leonard (ed) The Sociology of Community Action, Keele University Press, 1975
- "The social determinants of reproduction science and technology" in K. Knorr and H. Strasser (eds), Yearbook of the Sociology of Science, Reidel, 1975
- "Up against the welfare state: the claimant unions" in R. Miliband and J. Savile (eds), The Socialist Register, Merlin, pp. 179–204, 1973
- Rose, H. A.; Rose, S. P. (1972). "Chemical spraying as reported by refugees from South Vietnam". Science. 177 (4050): 710–2. Bibcode:1972Sci...177..710R. doi:10.1126/science.177.4050.710. PMID 5054148. S2CID 22098685.
- "The myth of the neutrality of science" (with Steven Rose) in W. Fuller (ed.), The Social Impact of Modern Biology, Routledge Kegan Paul, 1972
- "General Practice complaints I and II", New Law Journal, 24 and 31 August, pp. 772–775 and 786–788
- "The myth of the neutrality of science" in W. Fuller (ed.), The Social Impact of Modern Biology, Routledge Kegan Paul, pp. 215–224, 1971
- Rose, Hilary (1971). "Pangloss and Jeremiah in Science". Nature. 229 (5285): 459–462. Bibcode:1971Natur.229..459R. doi:10.1038/229459a0. PMID 16059296. S2CID 4163265.
