= Boycott, Divestment and Sanctions =

Movement demanding sanctions against Israel

Boycott, Divestment, and Sanctions
- Abbreviation: BDS
- Formation: 9 July 2005
- Founder: Omar Barghouti, Ingrid Jaradat
- Type: Nonprofit organization
- Purpose: Boycotts, political activism
- General Coordinator: Mahmoud Nawajaa
- Main organ: Palestinian BDS National Committee
- Website: bdsmovement.net

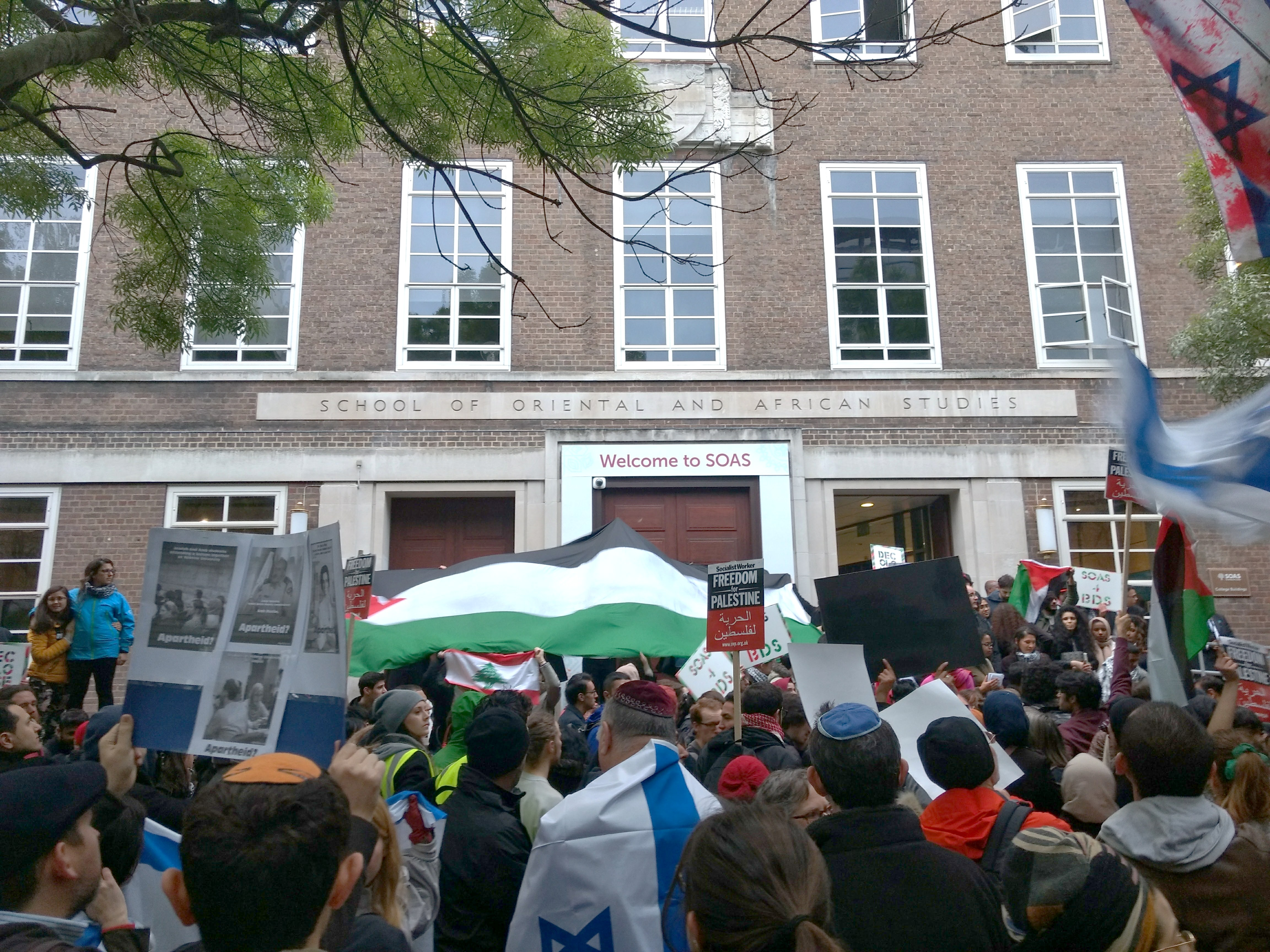
A BDS demonstration, with anti-BDS protesters nearer the camera, outside the School of Oriental and African Studies in London, April 2017

Boycott, Divestment, and Sanctions (BDS) is a nonviolent Palestinian-led movement promoting boycotts, divestments, and economic sanctions against Israel. Its stated objective is to pressure Israel to meet what the BDS movement describes as Israel's obligations under international law, which it defines as withdrawal from the occupied territories, removal of the separation barrier in the West Bank, full equality for Arab-Palestinian citizens of Israel, and promotion of "the rights of Palestinian refugees to return to their homes and properties".

The movement is organized and coordinated by the Palestinian BDS National Committee. BDS is modeled after the Anti-Apartheid Movement. Supporters describe it as a human rights movement and compare Palestinians' situation under Israeli policies to that of black South Africans under apartheid. Protests and conferences in support of the movement have been held in several countries.

Some critics accuse the BDS movement of antisemitism, a charge the movement calls an attempt to conflate anti-Zionism with antisemitism. Since 2015, the Israeli government has allocated significant resources to campaigns portraying BDS as antisemitic and has encouraged legal measures against the movement in other countries. Multiple countries, as well as a majority of U.S. states, have passed laws aimed at countering BDS.

== Background ==
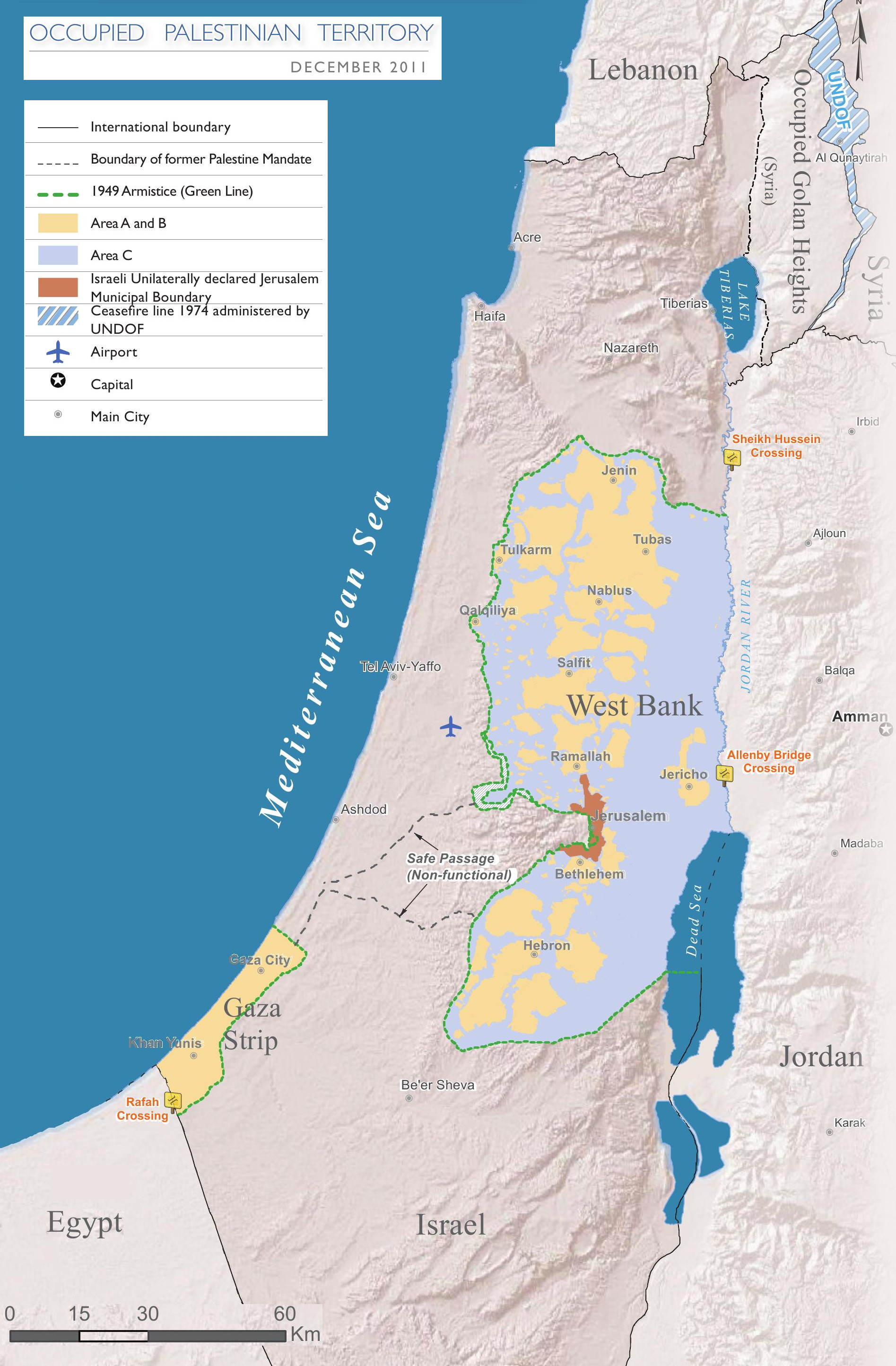
Area C (blue), the part of the West Bank under full Israeli control, in 2011

Many authors trace BDS's origins to the NGO Forum at the 2001 World Conference Against Racism in South Africa (Durban I). According to the Socialist Workers Party's Tom Hickey and Philip Marfleet, at the forum, Palestinian activists met with anti-apartheid veterans who identified parallels between Israel and apartheid South Africa and recommended campaigns like those they had used to defeat apartheid. The forum adopted a document that contained many ideas that appeared in the 2005 BDS Call; Israel was proclaimed an apartheid state that engages in human rights violations by denying Palestinian refugees' right of return, occupying the Palestinian territories, and discriminating against Arab citizens of Israel. The declaration recommended comprehensive sanctions and embargoes against Israel as the remedy.

In March 2002, while the Israeli army reoccupied all major Palestinian cities and towns and imposed curfews, a group of prominent Palestinian scholars published a letter calling for help from the "global civil society". The letter asked activists to demand that their governments suspend economic relations with Israel in order to stop its campaign of apartheid, occupation, and ethnic cleansing. In April 2002, Steven and Hilary Rose, professors at the Open University and the University of Bradford, initiated a call for a moratorium on academic collaboration with Israeli institutions. It quickly racked up over 700 signatories. Separately, Colin Blakemore and Richard Dawkins said they could no longer "in good conscience continue to cooperate with official Israeli institutions, including universities." Similar initiatives followed in the summer.

In August, Palestinian organizations in the occupied territories issued a call for a comprehensive boycott of Israel. The majority of the statements recalled the declarations made at the NGO Forum the year before. In October 2003, a group of Palestinian intellectuals called for a boycott of Israeli academic institutions. Attempts to coordinate the boycotts in a more structured way led to the formation of the Palestinian Campaign for Academic and Cultural Boycott of Israel (PACBI) in April 2004.

Colin Shindler said that the Oslo peace process's failure created a political void that allowed what had been a marginal rejectionist attitude to Israel to enter the European far-left mainstream in the form of proposals for a boycott. Rafeef Ziadah also attributes BDS to the peace process's failure. She said that BDS represents a rejection of the peace process paradigm of equalizing both sides in favor of seeing the situation as a colonial conflict between a native population and a settler colonial state supported by Western powers.

Others say that BDS's roots are in the Arab League's boycott of Zionist goods from Mandatory Palestine. According to the archaeologist and ancient historian Alex Joffe, BDS is merely the spearhead of a larger anti-Western juggernaut in which the dialectic between communism and Islam remains unresolved, and has antecedents in the Palestine Solidarity Campaign, the General Union of Palestinian Students, and the Muslim Brotherhood. Andrew Pessin and Doron Ben-Atar believe that BDS should be viewed in a historical context of other boycotts of Israel.

== Philosophy and goals ==
BDS demands that Israel end its "three forms of injustices that infringe international law and Palestinian rights" by:

- Ending its occupation and colonization of all Arab lands occupied in 1967 and dismantling the Wall; (Note: According to Hitchcock, occupied in 1967 wasn't in the original BDS Call. She writes: "It is not clear who decided to revise this phrase or exactly why, but it is likely that this phrase was added to clarify that the statement refers only to the West Bank and Gaza and not to the entirety of Palestine including Israel inside the internationally recognized 1967 Green Line... While I was unable to find any credible discussion of how this clarifying phrase came to be inserted into later versions of the BDS call, it seems fair to guess that it may have been added after criticism by those who thought it was too suggestive of a one-state solution. The fact that the original 2005 Call text and wording remains publicly available on the BDS movement website and in other locations may still elicit different readings from different audiences, though."; According to Qumsiyeh, the lack of clarity was intentional on the part of the formulators to avoid creating a debate about the call's relation to either a one-state or two-state solution.)
- Recognizing the fundamental rights of the Arab-Palestinian citizens of Israel to full equality; and
- Respecting, protecting and promoting the rights of Palestinian refugees to return to their homes and properties as stipulated in UN Resolution 194.

These demands, enshrined in a declaration named the BDS Call, are non-negotiable to BDS. BDS co-founder Omar Barghouti, citing South African Archbishop Desmond Tutu, has written: "I am not interested in picking up crumbs of compassion thrown from the table of someone who considers himself my master. I want the full menu of rights." Barghouti has also written:

Ending the largely discernible aspects of Israeli occupation while maintaining effective control over most of the Palestinian territory occupied in 1967 "in return" for Palestinians' accepting Israel's annexation of the largest colonial blocks ... has become the basic formula for the so-called peaceful settlement endorsed by the world's hegemonic powers and acquiesced to by an unelected, unrepresentative, unprincipled, and visionless Palestinian 'leadership.' The entire spectrum of Zionist parties in Israel and their supporters in the West, with few exceptions, ostensibly accept this unjust and illegal formula as the "only offer" on the table for the Palestinians—or else the menacing Israeli bludgeon.

BDS sees itself as a movement for all Palestinians, whether they live in the diaspora or in historical Palestine. BDS believes that negotiations with Israel should focus on "how Palestinian rights can be restored" and that they can only take place after Israel has recognized these rights. It frames the Israel-Palestinian conflict as between colonizer and colonized, between oppressor and oppressed, and rejects the notion that both parties are equally responsible for the conflict. For those reasons, BDS opposes some forms of dialogue between Israelis and Palestinians, which it says are counterproductive.

According to BDS, "all forms of international intervention and peace-making until now have failed" and so the international community should impose punitive measures, such as broad boycotts and divestment initiatives, against Israel, like those against South Africa during apartheid.

=== Opposition to bigotry ===
BDS uses the framework of "freedom, justice, and equality", saying that Palestinians are entitled to those rights like everyone else. According to Barghouti, it rejects all forms of racism, including antisemitism and Islamophobia. More generally, BDS says it is part of a global social movement that challenges neo-liberal Western hegemony and fights racism, sexism, poverty, and similar causes, and that its struggle for Palestinian rights should be seen as a small but critical part of that struggle.

In 2024, BDS general coordinator Mahmoud Nawajaa condemned far-right activists expressing support for Palestinians during the Gaza war, saying, "These far-right agitators have in the past spread explicitly antisemitic, homophobic and white supremacist content, but since October have pivoted to almost exclusively posting content about Gaza. They are not allies. Racism of all kinds has no place in our struggle for liberation."

=== Israel ===
According to BDS, Israel is an apartheid state as defined by two international treaties, the 1973 International Convention on the Suppression and Punishment of the Crime of Apartheid and the 1998 Rome Statute of the International Criminal Court. It says that while there are differences between Israel and apartheid-era South Africa, such as Israel's lack of explicit racial segregation laws, the systems are fundamentally similar. One of the main differences between South African and Israeli apartheid, BDS suggests, is that in the former a white minority dominated a black majority, but in Israel, a Jewish majority discriminates against a Palestinian minority in Israel and also keeps Palestinians under military occupation. It further contends that South African apartheid depended on black labor while Israeli apartheid is grounded in efforts to expel Palestinians from "Greater Israel".

BDS also sees the Israeli legal definition of itself as a "Jewish and democratic state" as contradictory. According to BDS, Israel upholds a facade of democracy but is not and cannot be a democracy because it is, in Omar Barghouti's words, "a settler-colonial state".

Opponents have said that comparing Israel to South Africa's apartheid regime "demonizes" Israel and is antisemitic. Supporters say that calling Israel an apartheid state is not antisemitic. To support that view, they cite prominent anti-apartheid activists such as Desmond Tutu and South African politician Ronnie Kasrils, who both have said that the situation in Gaza and the West Bank is "worse" than apartheid. Eric Goldstein, acting executive director of the Middle East and North Africa Division of Human Rights Watch, which neither supports nor condemns a boycott, said that the Biden administration would probably not counter the first Trump administration's attempt to label BDS antisemitic. He considers the movement maligned. In his view, "To campaign or boycott solely on behalf of Palestinians under Israeli rule no more constitutes anti-Semitism than doing so on behalf of Tibetans in China is in itself anti-Chinese racism."

=== Right of return ===
BDS demands that Israel allow the Palestinian refugees displaced in the 1948 war to return to what is now Israel. According to BDS's critics, calling for their right to return is an attempt to destroy Israel. If the refugees returned, Israel would become a Palestinian-majority state and Jewish dominance of Israel would be in jeopardy. They say this would undermine the Jewish people's right to self-determination and that calling for it is thus a form of antisemitism. Former Anti-Defamation League director Abraham Foxman has called it "the destruction of the Jewish state through demography."

Nadia Abu el-Haj has written that, indeed, BDS supporters believe that "the Israeli state has no right to continue exist as a racial state that builds the distinction between Jew and non-Jew into its citizenship laws, its legal regimes, its education system, its economy, and its military and policing tactics." BDS supporters further note that the Palestinian liberation movement has always rejected the idea that Israel has a right to exist as a racial state. While BDS deliberately refrains from advocating any particular political outcome, such as a one-state or two-state solution, Barghouti says that a Jewish state in historical Palestine contravenes the Palestinians' rights:

A Jewish state in Palestine in any shape or form cannot but contravene the basic rights of the indigenous Palestinian population and perpetuate a system of racial discrimination that ought to be opposed categorically.

Just as we would oppose a "Muslim state" or a "Christian state" or any kind of exclusionary state, definitely, most definitely, we oppose a Jewish state in any part of Palestine. No Palestinian, rational Palestinian, not a sellout Palestinian, will ever accept a Jewish state in Palestine.

Accepting modern-day Jewish-Israelis as equal citizens and full partners in building and developing a new shared society, free from all colonial subjugation and discrimination, as called for in the democratic state model, is the most magnanimous, rational offer any oppressed indigenous population can present to its oppressors. So don't ask for more.

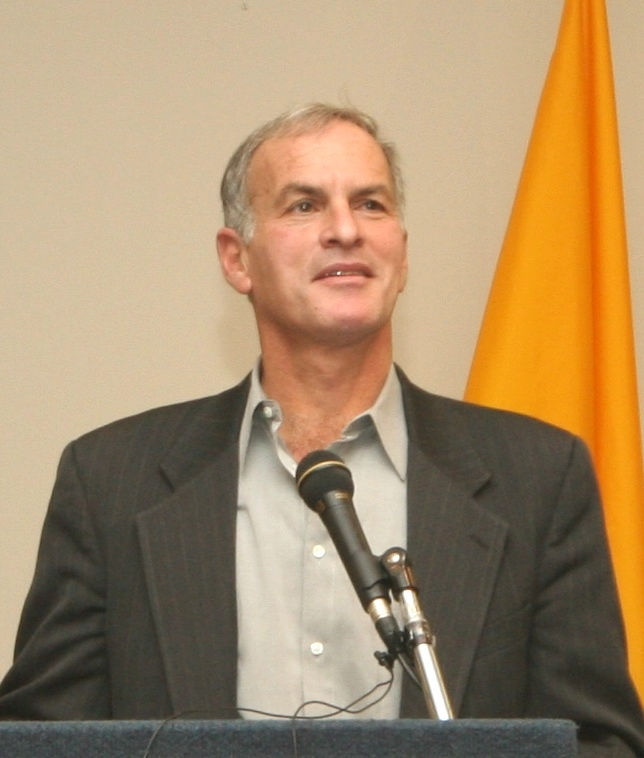
Norman Finkelstein has criticized BDS's position on the Palestinian refugees.

Norman Finkelstein, a vocal supporter of the two-state solution, has criticized BDS on this issue. Like Foxman, Finkelstein believes that BDS seeks to end Israel through demography, something he believes Israel will never acquiesce to. He therefore considers BDS a "silly, childish, and dishonest cult" because it does not explicitly state that its goal is to end Israel and because, according to him, that goal is unrealistic and broad public support cannot be found for the return of the refugees. Still, he believes that BDS's tactics, boycotts, divestment, and sanctions, are correct.

=== Critique of liberal Zionism ===
BDS criticizes liberal Zionists who oppose the occupation but also the right of return for the Palestinian refugees. According to liberal Zionists, both right-wing Zionists and BDS risk "destroying Israel", defined as turning Israel into a Palestinian-majority state, BDS by demanding equal citizenship for Arab-Palestinians and the right of return of the Palestinian refugees, and right-wing Zionists by insisting on building more settlements, eventually making a two-state solution impossible. With the two-state solution off the table, Israel would either have to grant citizenship to the Palestinians living under occupation, thus destroying Israel, or become an apartheid state. Liberal Zionists find apartheid repugnant and oppose apartheid in Israel, so they propose a boycott limited to Israeli West Bank settlements to pressure the Israeli government to stop building settlements. Peter Beinart in 2012 proposed a "Zionist BDS" that would advocate divestment from Israeli West Bank settlements but oppose divestment from Israeli companies. Beinart said this would legitimize Israel and delegitimize the occupation, thus challenging both the vision of BDS and that of the Israeli government.

Philip Weiss of Mondoweiss and other BDS supporters contend that liberal Zionists are more concerned with preserving Israel as a "Jewish state" than with human rights. Barghouti states that by denying the Palestinian refugees right of return simply because they are not Jewish, liberal Zionists adhere to the same Zionist racist principles that treat the Palestinians as a "demographic threat" to be dealt with in order to maintain Israel's character as a colonial, ethnocentric, apartheid state. Sriram Ananth writes that the BDS Call asks people to uncompromisingly stand against oppression. In his view, liberal Zionists have failed to do so by not endorsing the BDS Call.

=== Normalization ===
BDS opposes "normalization", the acceptance of Palestinian subjugation and a barrier to resistance. It criticizes initiatives where Israelis and Palestinians engage without addressing Israel's injustices, calling such efforts "co-existence" that favor the oppressor. Instead, BDS advocates "co-resistance"—joint efforts to challenge occupation and inequality. Projects like the now disbanded OneVoice have been denounced for ignoring core issues like apartheid and refugee rights. Critics say that anti-normalization hinders dialogue. BDS says that true dialogue is rooted in justice and equality, not false symmetry.

== Founding and organization ==
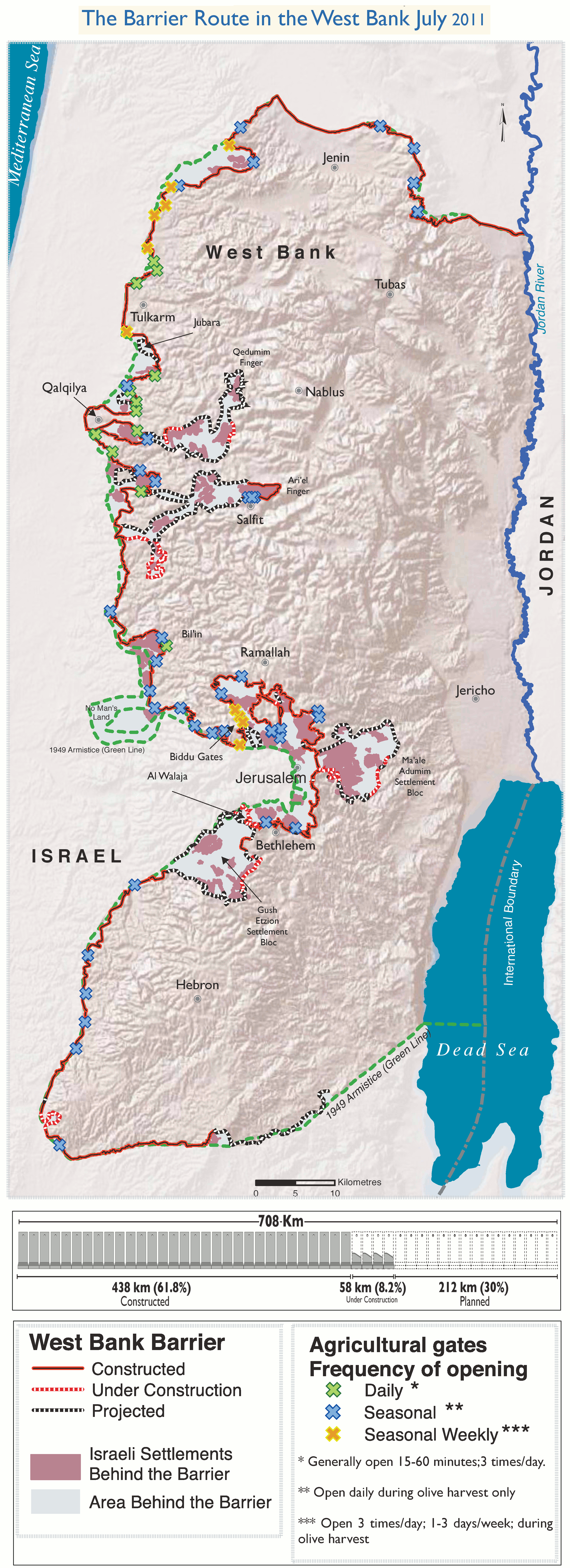
BDS was founded one year after the International Court of Justice had ruled the West Bank barrier illegal.

BDS was founded on 9 July 2005, on the first anniversary of the advisory opinion by the International Court of Justice in which the West Bank barrier was declared a violation of international law. 171 (Note: Barghouti writes "[m]ore than 170", Mazen "171 Palestinian civil society organizations", and Bueckert "a group of 170 organizations".) Palestinian non-governmental organizations (NGOs) representing every aspect of Palestinian civil society adopted the BDS Call.

The Palestinian BDS National Committee (BNC) was established at the first Palestinian BDS conference in Ramallah in November 2007 and in 2008 it became BDS's coordinating body. All BNC members are Palestinian organizations. This includes groups such as Hamas, Palestinian Islamic Jihad, and the PFLP, which are listed as the Council of Palestinian National and Islamic Forces on the BNC's website. As of 2020, it has 29 members. The BNC includes a general assembly with representatives from every BNC member, and an 11-seat secretariat elected every two years that governs the BNC. The general assembly meets about every third month while the secretariat handles day-to-day decision-making. Mahmoud Nawajaa serves as the BNC's General Coordinator and Alys Samson Estapé as the Europe Coordinator.

A precursor to BDS is the Palestinian Campaign for the Academic and Cultural Boycott of Israel (PACBI), which was founded in April 2004 in Ramallah with Barghouti as a founding committee member. PACBI led the campaign for the academic and cultural boycotts of Israel. It has since been integrated into the larger BDS movement. The U.S. arm of PACBI, the United States Association for the Academic and Cultural Boycott of Israel (USACBI), was founded in 2009.

The global BDS movement is by design highly decentralized and independent. This has allowed thousands of organizations and groups to become part of it, some of which are the BNC's main partners. A 2024 ISGAP report says that pro-BDS campus organizations, such as Students for Justice in Palestine, receive funding and strategic support from NGOs linked to terrorist groups such as Hamas and the PFLP, as well as from philanthropic entities such as the Rockefeller Brothers Fund.

In Israel, some more established radical groups, such as Women in Black, ICAHD, AIC, and New Profile, initially issued statements supporting the boycott. Boycott from Within often uses creative performances to display its support for the boycott and the research group Who Profits supplies BDS with information about companies complicit in the Israeli occupation. On campuses in the U.S., Canada and New Zealand, the student organization Students for Justice in Palestine (SJP) supports BDS. According to the American coordinating body National Students for Justice in Palestine, it had about 200 chapters in the U.S. as of 2018. The left-wing activist organization Jewish Voice for Peace (JVP) advocates for BDS among American Jewry.

In addition to these, political parties, trade unions and other NGOs have endorsed the BDS Call.

== Methods ==
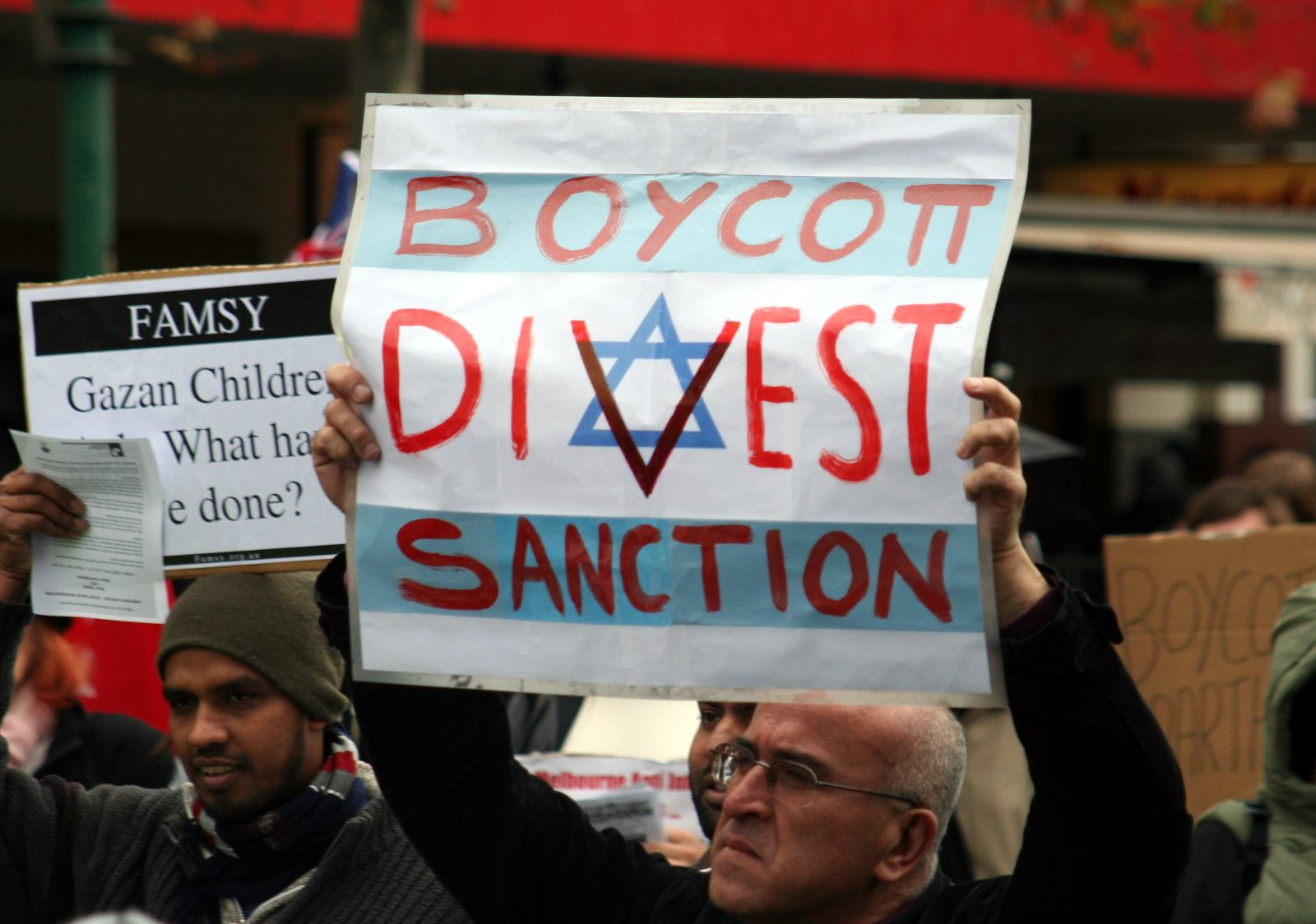
BDS protest in Melbourne, Australia, against Israel's 2007–present Gaza blockade and 2010 attack on a humanitarian flotilla, June 2010

BDS organizes campaigns for boycotts, divestment and sanctions against Israel. Boycotts are facilitated by urging the public to avoid purchasing goods made by Israeli companies, divestment by urging banks, pension funds, international companies, etc. to stop doing business in Israel, and sanctions by pressuring governments to end military trade and free-trade agreements with Israel and to suspend Israel's membership in international forums.

Global targets for boycott are selected by the BNC, but supporters are free to choose targets that suit them. The BNC encourages supporters to select targets based on their complicity in Israel's human rights violations, potential for cross-movement solidarity, media appeal, and likelihood of success. It also emphasizes the importance of creating campaigns and events that connect with issues of concern in their own communities.

== Activities ==
=== Campaigns ===
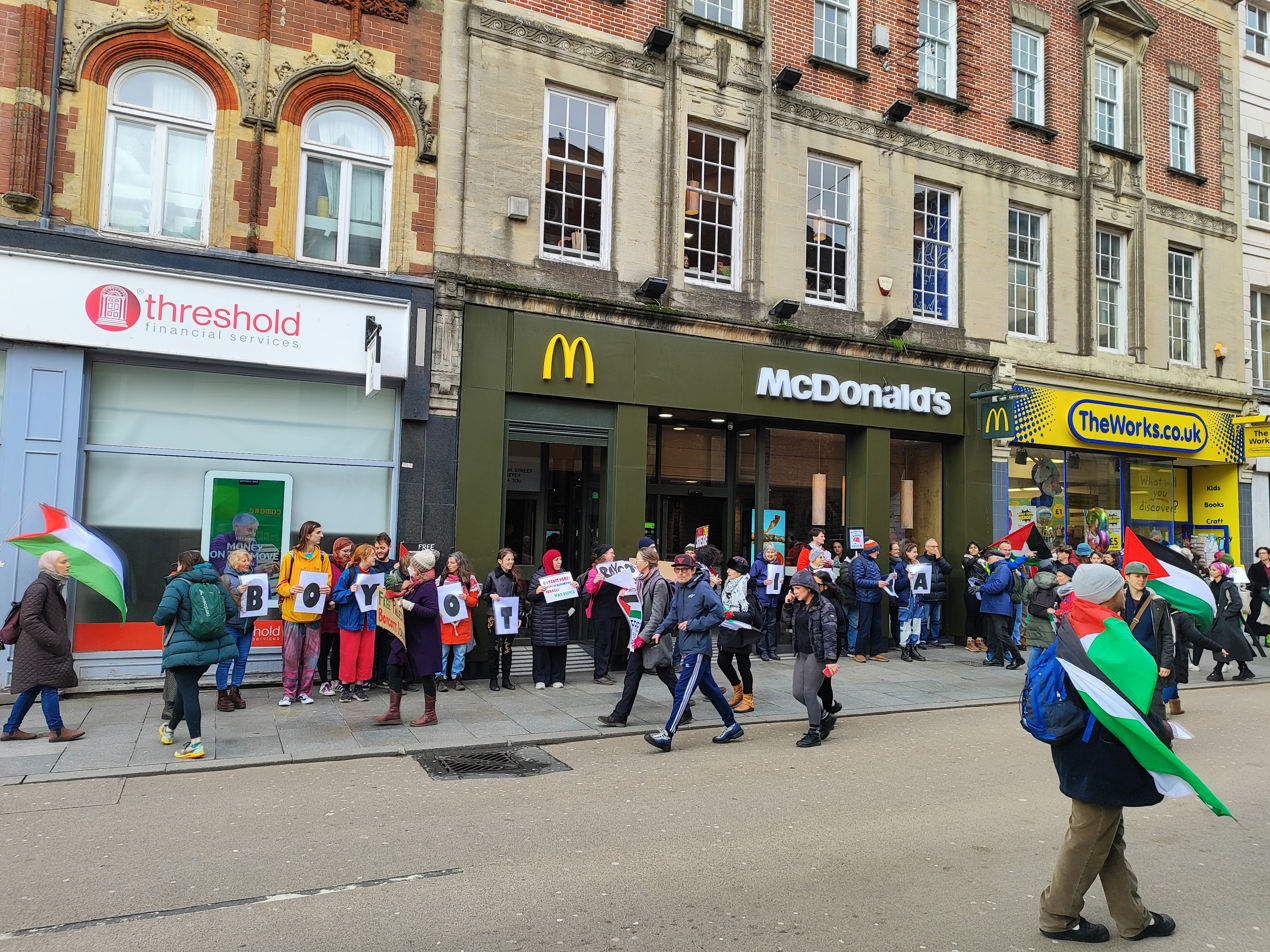
BDS called for a boycott of McDonald's for supporting Israeli soldiers in the Gaza war.

In addition to the campaigns listed in this section, a number of local campaigns have been created by BDS-affiliated groups and endorsed by the movement, including Code Pink's Stolen Beauty campaign, launched in 2009 against Israeli cosmetics manufacturer Ahava; an Australian campaign against Max Brenner, whose parent company, the Strauss Group, sent Israeli soldiers care packages; and (according to Michael Arria, writing in Mondoweiss) a campaign by the group Vermonters for Justice in Palestine (VTJP, previously known as Vermonters for a Just Peace in Israel/Palestine) against ice-cream maker Ben & Jerry over its sales of ice cream in Israeli settlements. In June 2021, VTJP called on Ben & Jerry's to "end complicity in Israel's occupation and abuses of Palestinian human rights." VTJP calls itself "a strong supporter of the...[BDS] campaign". On 19 July 2021, Ben & Jerry's CEO announced it would stop selling ice cream in the Israeli settlements in the West Bank: "Although Ben & Jerry's will no longer be sold in the OPT [Occupied Palestinian territories], we will stay in Israel through a different arrangement". According to Arria, Ben & Jerry's Independent Board of Directors complained that the CEO and Unilever had made the decision without its approval. Israeli Foreign Minister Yair Lapid said, "Over 30 states in the United States have passed anti-BDS legislation in recent years. I plan on asking each of them to enforce these laws against Ben & Jerry's", and called the decision "a shameful capitulation to antisemitism, BDS and everything bad in the anti-Israel and anti-Jewish discourse".

==== Derail Veolia and Alstom (2008–present) ====
Since November 2008, BDS has campaigned against the multinational French conglomerates Veolia and Alstom for their involvement in the Jerusalem Light Rail because it runs through the Israeli-occupied parts of East Jerusalem. According to BDS, the boycott had cost Veolia an estimated $20 billion as of 2015. In 2015 Veolia sold off its final investment in Israel, a 5% stake in CityPass owned by its subsidiary Transdev. BDS attributed the sell-off to its campaign, but Richard Dujardin, a member of Transdev's executive committee, said: "I will not say that it is pleasant to be chased by people saying we are not good guys all the time but really it was a business decision."

==== Orange (2010-2016) ====
In January 2016, French telecom operator Orange dropped its licensing deal with its Israeli mobile operator, Partner Communications. According to BDS, the deal was the result of its six-year campaign by unions and activists in France, Egypt, Tunisia and Morocco.

==== Stop G4S - Securing Israeli Apartheid (2012–present) ====
Since 2012, BDS has campaigned against G4S, the world's biggest security company, to get it to divest from Israel. As a result, G4S has been targeted by many BDS supporting groups, including Who Profits?, Addameer, Jews for Justice in Palestine, and Tadamon!. The campaign's first victory came in October 2011, when the student council of the Edinburgh University Students' Association adopted a motion to ban G4S from campus. In April 2012 the European Parliament declined to renew its contract with G4S, citing G4S's involvement in violations of international law. In 2014 the Gates Foundation sold its $170 million stake in G4S, a move BDS activists attributed to their campaign. The same year activists thanked officials in Durham County, North Carolina, for terminating its contract with G4S, though it was not clear that BDS's campaign was the cause. In February 2016, the international restaurant chain Crepes & Waffles terminated its security transport contracts with G4S.

G4S sold off its Israeli subsidiary G4S Israel in 2016, but BDS continues to campaign against G4S because it maintains a 50% stake in Policity, an Israeli police training center with presence inside Israeli prisons where thousands of Palestinians are detained.

==== Woolworths (2014–2016) ====
BDS South Africa undertook a boycott campaign against the South African retail chain Woolworths in 2014 over its trade relations with Israel. It was the first comprehensive consumer boycott of a South African retailer since 1994. The campaign used the Twitter hashtag #BoycottWoolworths which rapidly became one of the top trending hashtags on South African Twitter. The campaign attracted international media attention and was covered by The New York Times, Rolling Stone, and Al-Jazeera. The activists organized flash mobs, die-ins, and placed "Boycott Israeli Apartheid"-stickers on Woolworths' Israeli merchandise, all of which they published on social media. Consumers were encouraged to write to the company's store managers questioning the stocking of Israeli goods.

The campaign ended in mid-2016 when Woolworth informed its annual general meeting that it would no longer purchase Israeli products from the occupied territories.

==== Boycott HP (2016–present) ====
BDS runs a boycott campaign against the multinational information technology company Hewlett-Packard's two successors, HP Inc. and Hewlett Packard Enterprise, which it says are complicit in "Israel's occupation, settler-colonialism and apartheid regime". According to the campaign, HP supplies Israel with a biometric ID card system used to restrict Palestinians' freedom of movement and provides servers for the Israel Prison Service.

In April 2019, Federatie Nederlandse Vakbeweging, the Netherlands' largest trade union, dropped HP in its offer to its members. According to a spokesperson for the boycott HP campaign, the union used to offer a 15% discount on HP products and this would no longer be the case. In June 2019, Unite, the UK's second-largest trade union, joined the boycott against HP.

==== AXA Divest (2016–present) ====
The French multinational insurance agent AXA has since 2016 been the target of a campaign urging it to divest from Israeli arms manufacturer Elbit Systems and five major Israeli banks. AXA has, according to BDS, a responsible investment policy that forbids it from investing in, among other things, manufacturers of cluster bombs, and Elbit Systems makes cluster bombs. According to a report by corporate responsibility watchdog SumOfUs, AXA's involvement in Israel's occupation could expose it to criminal prosecution.

==== Red Card Israel (2016–present) ====
Red Card Israel is BDS's campaign to get Israel expelled from FIFA due to alleged violations against Palestinian football and because several Israeli teams from the Israeli-occupied West Bank are allowed to play in its national league, the Israel Football Association. In 2018, it scored a victory as Argentina's national football team canceled an upcoming friendly game in Jerusalem.

==== Puma (2018–present) ====
In July 2018, sportswear manufacturer Puma signed a four-year sponsorship deal with the Israel Football Association (IFA). The IFA includes six football clubs based in Israeli settlements. BDS wrote an open letter signed by over 200 Palestinian sports clubs urging the brand to end its sponsorship of teams in the settlements. The sportswear manufacturer did not, and BDS therefore launched a boycott campaign under the slogan "Give Puma the Boot".

In October 2019, activists placed unauthorized posters in the London underground urging people to boycott Puma. Transport for London said that it was flyposting and that it would immediately take action against the posters. In February 2020, Malaysia's largest university, Universiti Teknologi MARA, announced that it would end its sponsorship deal with Puma due to its involvement in Israel.

==== Eurovision Song Contest (2018–present) ====
BDS attempted to get artists to boycott Eurovision Song Contest 2019 because it was held in Israel. BDS accused Israel of using Eurovision to whitewash and distract attention from alleged war crimes against Palestinians. It also accused Israel of pinkwashing, due to Eurovision's popularity among LGBTQ fans. Although none of the acts scheduled to appear pulled out, activists considered the efforts successful due to the media coverage generated.

American pop star Madonna was one of the artists BDS urged to cancel her appearance at Eurovision. Roger Waters of Pink Floyd also tried to get her to cancel, saying that it "normalizes the occupation, the apartheid, the ethnic cleansing, the incarceration of children, the slaughter of unarmed protesters." Madonna refused, saying that she would neither "stop playing music to suit someone's political agenda" nor "stop speaking out against violations of human rights wherever in the world they may be."

In September 2018, 140 artists (including six Israelis) signed an open letter in support of a boycott of Eurovision. In response to the calls for boycott, over 100 celebrities, including English actor Stephen Fry, signed a statement against boycotting Eurovision in Israel: "We believe the cultural boycott movement is an affront to both Palestinians and Israelis who are working to advance peace through compromise, exchange, and mutual recognition".

Hatari, the band representing Iceland in the contest, held up Palestinian banners in front of the cameras at the event's finals, defying the EBU's rules against political gestures. BDS was not mollified: "Artists who insist on crossing the Palestinian boycott picket line, playing in Tel Aviv in defiance of our calls, cannot offset the harm they do to our human rights struggle by 'balancing' their complicit act with some project with Palestinians. Palestinian civil society overwhelmingly rejects this fig-leafing", it said.

During the 2024 and 2025 editions of the contest, BDS-affiliated groups led widespread calls to exclude Israel from the competition, similar to the 2022 exclusion of Russia. Protests were particularly prominent during the 2024 event in Malmö, Sweden.

==== Google and Amazon (#NoTechForApartheid) (2021–present) ====
In 2021, Google and Amazon signed "Project Nimbus", a $1.2 billion contract to provide cloud and AI services to the Israeli government and military. The BDS movement, in alliance with the worker-led "No Tech for Apartheid" campaign, has called for a boycott and divestment from both companies, alleging the technology enables surveillance and data collection used in the occupation. In April 2024, Google dismissed over 50 employees after sit-in protests against the contract at its offices in New York and California.

==== Siemens (2022–present) ====
The BDS movement leads a "Stop Siemens" campaign, citing Siemens's role as the Great Sea Interconnector's main contractor. The project, an undersea electricity cable linking Israel's national grid to the EU via Cyprus and Greece, is criticized by activists for integrating illegal Israeli settlements into the European energy network.

==== Carrefour (2022–present) ====
In December 2022, the BDS movement launched a global campaign against the French retailer Carrefour after its franchise agreement with Electra Consumer Products and its subsidiary Yeinot Bitan, companies that operate in illegal settlements. By 2024, the boycott reportedly contributed to Carrefour's withdrawal from several markets in the Middle East, including Jordan, Oman, and Morocco, where stores were rebranded or closed due to declining revenue. The UN Human Rights Office (OHCHR) has included Carrefour's partners in its database of business enterprises involved in settlement activities.

==== Coca-Cola (2024–present) ====
While long a subject of unofficial boycotts, Coca-Cola was officially added to the BDS movement's "priority target" list in 2024. The campaign focuses on the operations of its Israeli franchisee, Central Bottling Company (CBC), which maintains a distribution center in the illegal settlement of Atarot in the West Bank. In 2024, the company had significant sales declines in several Muslim-majority countries, including a 23% drop in Bangladesh after a controversial advertising campaign intended to distance the brand from Israel.

==== Tesco (2025–present) ====
In November 2025, the BDS movement launched a campaign against British retailer Tesco after an employee was suspended at a store in Newcastle, County Down, Northern Ireland. The worker had been placed on suspension pending disciplinary action after refusing to handle products imported from Israel. Activists and trade union representatives organized protests outside the retail branch to show solidarity with the employee and demand the withdrawal of the disciplinary measures, arguing that workers should not be penalized for objecting to the sale of Israeli goods. The campaign also used online petitions that gathered thousands of signatures demanding that Tesco permanently cease stocking products of Israeli origin.

==== Reebok (2025–present) ====
In February 2025, the BDS movement launched a campaign calling on Reebok to revoke a two-year sponsorship agreement with the Israel Football Association (IFA) that it had signed earlier that month. Activists argued that the sponsorship provided legitimacy to the IFA, which includes several football clubs based in illegal Israeli settlements in the West Bank.

==== Sanctions on Israeli settlements in West Bank (2026) ====
In September 2026, Britain, Canada and France said they would sanction imports from Israeli settlements in the West Bank. In announcing Britain's move, Foreign Secretary Ed Miliband cited "ethnic cleansing of Palestinians" in the West Bank "perpetrated by settler terrorists". Miliband added that the "Israeli government has turned a blind eye to this and worse". Israel responded by saying it would close the British Consulate General in East Jerusalem. A dozen countries, including Spain, Denmark, and Ireland, said they supported restrictions on trade with Israeli settlements.

=== Academic boycott ===
Universities have been primary targets of the BDS movement, according to English professor Cary Nelson, "because faculty and students can become passionate about justice, sometimes without adequate knowledge about the facts and consequences. ... [U]niversities also offer the potential for small numbers of BDS activists to leverage institutional status and reputation for a more significant cultural and political impact."

BDS says there is a close connection between Israeli academic institutions and the Israeli state, including its military, and that an academic boycott is warranted. Modern weapon systems and military doctrines used by the Israeli military are developed at Israeli universities that also use a system of economic merit and scholarship to students who serve in the army. Like the BDS-led cultural boycott, the academic boycott targets Israeli institutions and not individual academics.

BDS encourages academics to avoid academic events convened or co-sponsored by Israel, research and development activities that involve institutional cooperation agreements with Israeli universities, projects that receive funding from Israel or its lobby groups, addresses and talks by officials from Israeli academic institutions at international venues, study-abroad programmes in Israel for international students, and publishing in Israeli academic journals or serving on such journals' review boards.

After the October 7 attacks in 2023, rallies and encampments erupted on over 100 U.S. campuses, in which some students and faculty endorsed violence and demanded actions aligned with the BDS movement, leading in some cases to property damage, harassment of Jewish community members, and administrative concessions. Most universities did not accede to BDS demands.

==== Divestment resolutions at U.S. universities ====
In North America, many public and private universities have large financial holdings. Campus BDS activists have therefore organized campaigns asking universities to divest from companies complicit in the occupation. These campaigns often revolve around attempts to pass divestment resolutions in the school's student government. While few universities have heeded the call to divest, activists believe the resolutions are symbolically important. The discussions of divestment spur campuswide interest in BDS, which movement organizers use to their advantage by advocating for an unfamiliar cause.

In 2009, Hampshire College became the first U.S. college to divest from companies profiting from Israel's occupation as its board of trustees voted to sell its shares in Caterpillar Inc., Terex, Motorola, ITT, General Electric, and United Technologies. Hampshire's president said that SJP's campaigning brought about the decision, but members of the board of trustees denied that.

In 2010, the UC Berkeley Student Senate passed a resolution calling for the university to divest from companies that conduct business with Israel. The resolution was vetoed by the Student Body president, who said it was "a symbolic attack on a specific community." In 2013, another divestment bill passed but the university stated that it would not divest.

Many divestment campaigns began in the early 2000s, years before BDS was founded. In some cases, it has taken them over a decade to get resolutions passed. For example, at the University of Michigan, a student group called Students Allied for Freedom and Equality (SAFE) began campaigning for a divestment resolution in 2002. It was brought up for the eleventh time in 2017 and passed 23–17 with five abstentions. Reportedly, the hearing on the resolution was the longest in student government history. In December, the Board of Regents at the university rejected the resolution, stating that "we strongly oppose any action involving the boycott, divestment or sanction of Israel."

In 2002, students at Columbia University began promoting a divestment resolution. In September 2020, Columbia College undergraduates passed a referendum calling on the university to boycott and divest from companies that "profit from or engage in the State of Israel's acts towards Palestinians." After the vote, Columbia President Lee Bollinger said the university "should not change its investment policies on the basis of particular views about a complex policy issue, especially when there is no consensus across the University community about that issue", clarifying that endowment divestment decisions are not determined by student referendum but by the university's Advisory Committee.

In 2019, Brown University's student government passed a non-binding resolution supporting divestment from companies linked to Israeli activities in the Palestinian territories. The university declined to act on it, citing its policy of not taking positions on geopolitical disputes.

BDS opponents often focus on the supposed divisiveness debates about divestment resolutions cause. According to Nelson, the primary effect divestment resolutions have is the promotion of anti-Israel (and sometimes antisemitic) sentiment within student bodies, faculty, and academic departments. Some opponents say that activists promoting divestment resolutions often cheat or operate clandestinely. They claim that resolutions are often made with minimal notice, giving the opposition no time to react; that activists bring outsiders to influence opinion or vote on university resolutions even when this is unauthorized; and that activists change the text of resolutions once passed. Judea Pearl has said that it is irrelevant to BDS supporters whether a particular resolution passes, because the real goal is to keep debate alive and influence future policymakers to find fault with Israel.

==== Israel Apartheid Week ====
Groups affiliated with BDS hold events known as Israel Apartheid Week (IAW) in February or March each year. IAW began at the University of Toronto in 2006, (Note: According to Morrison, IAW began in 2005.) but has since spread and in 2014 was held on 250 campuses worldwide. IAW aims to increase public awareness of the Palestinians' history and the racial discrimination they experience and to build support for BDS. IAW allows activists to frame the issue as one of racial oppression and discrimination rather than a "conflict" between two equal sides. According to BDS's opponents, IAW intends to link Israel to evils such as apartheid and racism.

=== Cultural boycott ===
According to PACBI, "Cultural institutions are part and parcel of the ideological and institutional scaffolding of Israel's regime of occupation, settler-colonialism and apartheid against the Palestinian people." It says that Israel should therefore be subjected to a cultural boycott like the one against apartheid-era South Africa. According to BDS, most but not all Israeli cultural institutions support "the hegemonic Zionist establishment" and are thus implicated in Israel's crimes and should be boycotted.

BDS distinguishes between individuals and institutions. Unlike the cultural boycott against South Africa, BDS's cultural boycott does not target individuals. BDS supports the right to freedom of expression and rejects boycotts based on identity or opinion. Thus, Israeli cultural products are not per se subject to boycott. But if a person represents Israel, aids its efforts to "rebrand" itself, or is commissioned by an official Israeli body, then their activities are subject to the institutional boycott BDS calls for.

BDS also supports a boycott of "normalization projects", which it defines as:

Cultural activities, projects, events and products involving Palestinians and/or other Arabs on one side and Israelis on the other (whether bi- or multilateral) that are based on the false premise of symmetry/parity between the oppressors and the oppressed or that assume that both colonizers and colonized are equally responsible for the "conflict" are intellectually dishonest and morally reprehensible forms of normalization that ought to be boycotted.

The only Israeli-Palestinian projects BDS favors are those in which the Israeli party recognizes the three rights enumerated in the "BDS Call" and that also emphasize resistance to oppression over coexistence. (Note: See section Normalization for details) BDS strongly discourages "fig-leafing" by international culture workers—attempts to "compensate" for participating in Israeli events using "balancing gestures" that promote Palestinian rights. BDS says that fig-leafing contributes to the false perception of symmetry between the colonial oppressor and the colonized.

The cultural boycott has been supported by thousands of artists around the world, such as musician Roger Waters and American author Alice Walker. In 2015, more than 1,000 British artists pledged their support for the boycott, drawing parallels to the one against South African apartheid:

Israel's wars are fought on the cultural front too. Its army targets Palestinian cultural institutions for attack and prevents the free movement of cultural workers. Its own theatre companies perform to settler audiences on the West Bank—and those same companies tour the globe as cultural diplomats, in support of 'Brand Israel'. During South African apartheid, musicians announced they weren't going to 'play Sun City'. Now we are saying, in Tel Aviv, Netanya, Ashkelon or Ariel, we won't play music, accept awards, attend exhibitions, festivals or conferences, run masterclasses or workshops until Israel respects international law and ends its colonial oppression of the Palestinians.

Several artists have not heeded BDS's call not to perform in Israel, on the grounds that (for example):

- Performing in a country is not the same as supporting that country's government;
- By performing in Israel, artists have a chance to tell the Israelis what they feel about their government and that can help bring peace;
- By not performing in Israel, artists sever contacts with Israel's strongly pro-Palestinian cultural community, which risks hardening opposition to the Palestinian struggle among Israelis;
- BDS supporters like Roger Waters and Brian Eno who urge fellow artists not to perform in Israel are engaging in a form of bullying.

== Impact ==
=== Economic ===
In June 2015, a RAND Corporation study estimated that a successful BDS campaign against Israel could cost the Israeli economy $47 billion over ten years. The figure was based on a model that examined previous international boycotts; the report noted that making an assessment of BDS's economic effects is difficult because evidence of sanctions' effectiveness is mixed. A leaked Israeli government report estimated a more modest $1.4 billion per year. Andrew Pessin and Doron Ben-Atar have said that since Israel's gross domestic product nearly doubled between 2006 and 2015 and foreign investment in Israel tripled during the same period, BDS has not had a significant impact on Israel's economy. A 2015 Israeli Knesset report concluded that BDS had no discernible impact on Israel despite the vulnerability of its export-dependent economy to such a campaign, and that exports to Europe had doubled since the launch of the movement. Furthermore, financial effects on stock returns of U.S. companies targeted by BDS campaigns in the aftermath of the October 7 attacks were generally minimal and short-lived.

Adam Reuter of the Israeli Reuter Meydan Investment House, and founder of the financial risk management firm Financial Immunities, has said that boycotts of consumer goods are ineffective because 95% of Israel's exports are business-to-business. In 2018, Reuter wrote that a years-long Financial Immunities study of the BDS movement's effects on the Israeli economy that began in 2010 calculated that the proportion of economic damage to Israel was 0.004%. As part of the study, managers of Israeli companies were asked how much economic damage they had sustained, with only 0.75% of companies reporting any identifiable economic damage. The rate of damage for all of them was less than 10% of their turnover, most of which took place during the 2014 Gaza War. Nevertheless, two organizations divested from Israel in 2014: Luxembourg's state pension fund, FDC, excluded eight major Israeli firms, including Bank Hapoalim, Bank Leumi, AFI Group, and the American firm Motorola Solutions as part of its socially responsible investments program, and Norway's YMCA-YWCA announced that it would support a "broad economic boycott of goods and services from Israel and Israeli settlements".

BDS's opponents say that it is good for Palestinians in the West Bank that Israeli companies operate there. They say they offer employment with higher wages than Palestinian employers, the employees do not feel exploited, and so it is counterproductive to boycott companies operating in the settlements. BDS supporters say that many Palestinian workers in settlements earn less than the Israeli minimum wage, that their salaries are often withheld and their social rights denied, and that they are often exposed to danger in the workplace. To work in settlements, Palestinians must obtain work permits from the Israeli Civil Administration. The permits can be annulled at any time—for example, if the workers try to unionize or engage in any kind of political activity. BDS supporters say that, regardless of the economic costs, Palestinians overwhelmingly support the boycott against Israel.

After widespread boycotts in the Middle East sparked by its Israeli franchisee giving the IDF free meals, McDonald's Corporation announced in April 2024 that it would buy back all 225 restaurants from Alonyal Ltd to regain direct control over the brand's local operations.

=== Non-economic ===
Reviewing four lists of achievements published by the BDS movement between July 2017 and December 2018, analyst Amin Prager concluded that, with some exceptions, the impact was limited, but that BDS's greatest potential effect arises from its long-term aim to influence discourse about Israel's legitimacy and international standing. The Reut Institute says that BDS employs a "double standard" and "singles out" Israel. In its view, it is a form of antisemitism to campaign against Israeli human rights violations when other governments engage in similar or more repressive actions. Marc Greendorfer believes that BDS "applies a unique standard [to Israel] not applied to any other country". BDS supporters reply that, by that logic, any movement focusing on a single country's human rights violations would be racist; the Anti-Apartheid Movement singled out South Africa while ignoring human rights violations in other African countries, and U.S. sanctions against Iran affect only Iran and not other countries committing similar human rights violations.

Barghouti has said that BDS focuses on Israeli oppression because it affects the Palestinians and BDS is a Palestinian movement. He rhetorically asks: "If you suffer from the flu and seek medication from it, is it misguided to do so when there are worse diseases out there? Well, the flu is the disease that is afflicting you!" He and other BDS supporters say that it is the Western world, not BDS, that has a double standard, by not holding Israel accountable for its human rights violations. Jacobs and Soske say that boycotts, divestment, and sanctions is a strategy that does not make sense against all regimes worthy of opprobrium. Pol Pot's regime, Boko Haram, and ISIS would be unlikely to respond to the strategy, but the Israeli government might, they say.

According to American lawyer Alan Dershowitz, BDS disincentivizes Palestinians from negotiating with Israel. The ADL says that BDS ignores the Israeli government's willingness to negotiate with the Palestinians and instead favors delegitimization tactics. According to Haaretz columnist and Brown University student Jared Samilow, BDS's most significant impact is the social cost it puts upon Jews living outside Israel.

== Reception ==
=== Academic response ===
Thousands of scholars, including the theoretical physicist Stephen Hawking, and a large number of academic and student associations have endorsed the academic boycott against Israel. They include the American Studies Association (ASA), the American Anthropological Association, (Note: In 2015, the association’s annual meeting voted in favor of a boycott but it was narrowly overturned by a vote of the full membership in 2016. In 2023, the full membership voted for a boycott.) the Association for Asian American Studies, the Association for Humanist Sociology, the National Association of Chicana and Chicano Studies, the Native American and Indigenous Studies Association, the Middle East Studies Association, the National Women's Studies Association, and dozens of other student associations. Cary Nelson documents many of these cases in his book Dreams Deferred: A Concise Guide to the Israeli-Palestinian Conflict & the Movement to Boycott Israel. The pattern Nelson finds is that a core of activists within each organization prioritized exclusion of pro-Israel colleagues within their discipline.

In 2007, the American Jewish Committee ran an ad in The Times titled "Boycott Israeli universities? Boycott ours, too!" It denounced the academic boycott against Israel and was initially signed by 300 university presidents. It said that an academic boycott was "utterly antithetical to the fundamental values of the academy, where we will not hold intellectual exchange hostage to the political disagreements of the moment." Phil Gasper, writing for the International Socialist Review, said that the ad grossly misrepresented the boycott's rationale and that its characterization of it as "political disagreements of the moment" trivialized it.

In December 2013, ASA joined the boycott of Israeli academic institutions. Israel is the only nation the ASA has boycotted in the 52 years since its founding. Judea Pearl lambasted the ASA's endorsement of the boycott and wrote that it had a "non-academic character". Dershowitz and IAN point to Palestinian President Mahmoud Abbas's support of a boycott specific to Israeli businesses that operate in Israeli settlements in the Palestinian Territories over a general boycott of Israel as evidence that BDS is not in the Palestinians' favor. American academic Cary Nelson wrote, "BDS actually offers nothing to the Palestinian people, whom it claims to champion."

In 2018, after previously agreeing to write a letter of recommendation for a student, associate professor John Cheney-Lippold at the University of Michigan declined to write it after discovering the student was planning to study in Israel. After critics called a letter to the student antisemitic, Cheney-Lippold said he supported BDS for human rights reasons and rejected antisemitism. Guidelines from PACBI say faculty "should not accept to write recommendations for students hoping to pursue studies in Israel". 58 civil rights, religious, and education advocacy organizations called on the university to sanction Cheney-Lippold. University officials ended the controversy by disciplining him and issuing a public statement that read in part, "Withholding letters of recommendation based on personal views does not meet our university's expectations for supporting the academic aspirations of our students. Conduct that violates this expectation and harms students will not be tolerated and will be addressed with serious consequences. Such actions interfere with our students' opportunities, violate their academic freedom and betray our university's educational mission."

In November 2019, the Arab Council for Regional Integration, a group of 32 Arab intellectuals, repudiated BDS at a London conference. It said that BDS had cost the Arab nations billions in trade, "undercut Palestinian efforts to build institutions for a future state, and torn at the Arab social fabric, as rival ethnic, religious and national leaders increasingly apply tactics that were first tested against Israel." At the council, Kuwaiti information minister Sami Abdul-Latif Al-Nisf spoke about the opportunity costs to Palestinians, saying that outsize focus on BDS draws money and attention away from investment in Palestinian professionals such as doctors and engineers.

Holocaust historian Deborah Lipstadt has said that, if boycotting Israel were the main goal, then we "would all have to give up our iPhones", because a lot of technology is created in Israel. According to Lipstadt, BDS's objective is to make anything coming out of Israel seem toxic but it is not the case that "any kid who supports B.D.S. is ipso facto an anti-Semite".

On 23 March 2022, the Middle East Studies Association (MESA) voted 768 to 167 to endorse an academic boycott of Israeli institutions for their "complicity in Israel's violations of human rights and international law through their provision of direct assistance to the military and intelligence establishments." MESA has 2,700 members and over 60 institutional members. In 2014, it voted 265 to 79 to allow its members to support BDS. After the vote, Brandeis University severed ties with MESA, citing "academic freedom".

Noam Chomsky has argued against BDS. His principal argument is that its philosophy is intellectually indolent and designed to make the boycotters feel good more than to actually help any Palestinians. Chomsky also rejects the analogy between apartheid South Africa and the State of Israel and BDS's demand for a Palestinian right of return, which he called "a virtual guarantee of failure". In a 2022 interview, he said that calling Israeli actions toward Palestinians "apartheid" is a "gift to Israel" because "the Occupied Territories are much worse than South Africa". He said BDS "has a mixed record" and "should become "more flexible [and] more thoughtful" about its actions' effects. He said, "The groundwork is there" and "It is necessary to think carefully about how to carry it forward".

=== Cultural response ===
The organizers of the weeklong Rototom Sunsplash music festival held in Spain in 2015 canceled the scheduled appearance of Jewish American rapper Matisyahu after he refused to sign a statement supporting a Palestinian state. Matisyahu said that it was "appalling and offensive" that he was singled out as the "one publicly Jewish-American artist". After criticism from Spain's daily paper El País, the Spanish government, and Jewish organizations, the organizers apologized to Matisyahu and reinvited him to perform, saying they "made a mistake, due to the boycott and the campaign of pressure, coercion and threats employed by the BDS País Valencià". In 2017, a pro-Israel organization brought charges against eight members of the BDS movement over their role in the 2015 action against Matisyahu. On 11 January 2021, the Valencia Appeals Court acquitted the BDS members of the charges. The court said that the BDS members' action was "protected by freedom of expression and that their intention was not to discriminate against Matisyahu because he is Jewish but to protest Israel's policies".

In December 2017, New Zealand pop star Lorde cancelled the 5 June 2018 concert of her Melodrama World Tour in Tel Aviv after being urged by BDS-supporting fans to boycott Israel, supporting the ongoing cultural boycott of the nation. The decision drew criticism internationally; Israeli Culture Minister Miri Regev urged Lorde to avoid "foreign and ridiculous political considerations" and the Creative Community for Peace released a statement—signed by numerous artists and industry figures—criticizing the decision. Variety noted that Lorde continued to perform in Russia despite that country’s widely condemned anti-LGBT laws.

According to American organization Creative Community for Peace, some performers feel harassed or even physically threatened by BDS groups.

In July 2019, after the Open Source Festival in Düsseldorf disinvited the American rapper Talib Kweli for refusing to denounce the BDS movement, 103 artists, including Peter Gabriel, Naomi Klein and Boots Riley, signed an open letter condemning Germany's attempts to impose restrictions on artists who support Palestinian rights.

In 2019, the parliament of Germany issued a resolution that advocated against financing any project that called for a boycott of Israel on the grounds that the BDS movement was antisemitic. Twenty-five institutions, including the Goethe Institute, the Federal Cultural Foundation, the Berlin Deutsches Theater, the German Academic Exchange Service Artists Exchange, the Berliner Festspiele, and the Einstein Forum issued a joint statement in 2019, after intensive internal debates, that "accusations of antisemitism are being misused to push aside important voices and to distort critical positions".

According to Israeli actress Noa Tishby, BDS's official website is riddled with cherry-picked misinformation about the history of the Arab-Israeli conflict. She notes that the website says "Israel deliberately attacked Palestinian ... civilian infrastructure" but does not contextualize the claim with Hamas's use of human shields in the Gaza Strip. According to Tishby, reticence about Hamas activities against Israel, radical ideology, and oppression of Palestinians is a pattern on BDS's website.

In 2022, more than 30 acts withdrew from the Sydney Festival to protest a $20,000 sponsorship agreement with the Israeli Embassy in Australia. Israel's Deputy Ambassador to Australia Ron Gerstenfeld condemned the BDS movement's "antisemitic" and "aggressive campaign" against performers.

=== Israeli response ===
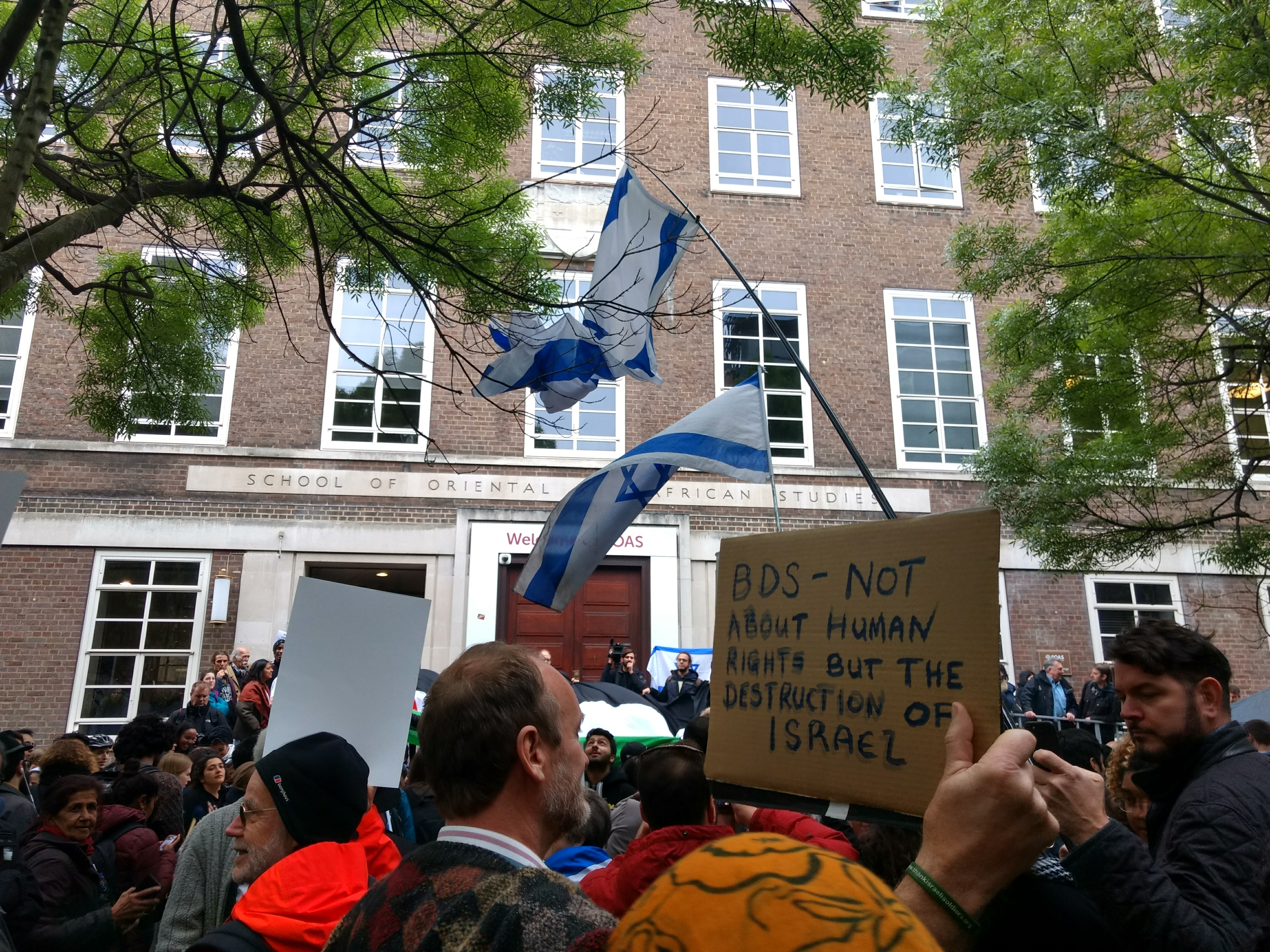
Criticism of the BDS

According to the Israeli Institute for National Security Studies, BDS depicts Israel as a racist, fascist, totalitarian, and apartheid state, which the institute considers defamation and demonization of Israel. It says that boycotting Israeli targets regardless of their position or connection to the Israel-Palestinian conflict is incitement.

In 2007, The Economist called the boycott "flimsy" and ineffective, writing, "blaming Israel alone for the impasse in the occupied territories will continue to strike many outsiders as unfair", and noting that the Palestinian leadership did not support the boycott. By early 2014, it wrote that the campaign, "[o]nce derided as the scheming of crackpots", was "turning mainstream" in many Israelis' eyes.

In 2016, Israeli President Reuven Rivlin compared boycotts to violence and incitement. He asserted that boycotts only divide people, that BDS delegitimizes Israel, and that some parts of the movement seek Israel's destruction. In January 2017, Israeli Public Security Minister Gilad Erdan invited actors Daniel Dae Kim, Meagan Good, Sonequa Martin-Green, Kenric Green and Mark Pellegrino on a government-sponsored trip to Israel as part of an effort to combat the BDS movement.

A 2018 report by the Israeli Strategic Affairs Ministry accused the EU of having given 5 million euros to organizations that "promote anti-Israel delegitimization and boycotts". EU officials sharply rebuked the report. Foreign policy chief Federica Mogherini called the accusations "vague and unsubstantiated" and said they conflated "terrorism with the boycott issue". A February 2019 report by the Israeli Ministry, Terrorists in Suits, claimed that BDS is a "complementary track to terrorism" and that Hamas and Popular Front for the Liberation of Palestine (PFLP) members had infiltrated organizations affiliated with BDS to advance "the elimination of the State of Israel as the nation-state of the Jewish people". The report alleged Leila Khaled was an example of such infiltration. According to the report, Khaled, a former PFLP member who hijacked a plane in 1969 and attempted to hijack another in 1970, was a well-known figure in BDS. BDS dismissed the report as "wildly fabricated and recycled propaganda" from "the far-right Israeli government". In 2019, Amnesty cited the reports as examples of Israel's efforts to delegitimize Israeli and Palestinian human rights defenders and organizations.

In November 2020, Haaretz columnist Anshel Pfeffer wrote that Israel had experienced a surge in foreign trade and relations since 2005, including the normalization agreements with Arab Gulf countries. Pfeffer called BDS "the most failed, overhyped and exaggerated campaign of the first two decades of the 21st century" and a "minor creed in the cultural and identity shadow wars on the Internet and a tiny handful of campuses in the west", writing that it "failed on every front with the minor exception of bullying a handful of singers and academics not to take part in concerts or conferences in Israel." He wrote that the Israeli right was eager to keep the spectre of the movement's threat alive to try to keep a siege mentality in place among the Israeli population.

=== Palestinian response ===
Palestinians living in the occupied Palestinian territories overwhelmingly support BDS. In a 2015 poll, 86% supported the boycott campaign and 64% believed that boycotting would help end the occupation.

The number of Palestinian civil society organizations that support BDS has been rising steadily since its inception in 2005. Some of the Palestinian NGOs supporting BDS are umbrella organizations, such as the Palestinian NGOs Network, which had 135 members as of 2020. According to Melanie Meinzer, many Palestinian NGOs refrain from endorsing BDS because their dependence on donors constrains their politics. According to Finkelstein, BDS exaggerates its level of support and many Palestinian NGOs endorsing it are small, one-person NGOs.

Palestinian trade unions have been very supportive of BDS; the 290,000-member Palestine General Federation of Trade Unions was one of the original signatories of the BDS Call. In 2011, the Palestinian Trade Union Coalition for BDS was created with the objective to promote BDS among trade unions internally.

Leading voices in the Palestinian diaspora, such as Ali Abunimah, Joseph Massad, and Linda Sarsour have endorsed BDS, as have several Palestinian members of the Israeli parliament, including Haneen Zoabi, Basel Ghattas, and Jamal Zahalka.

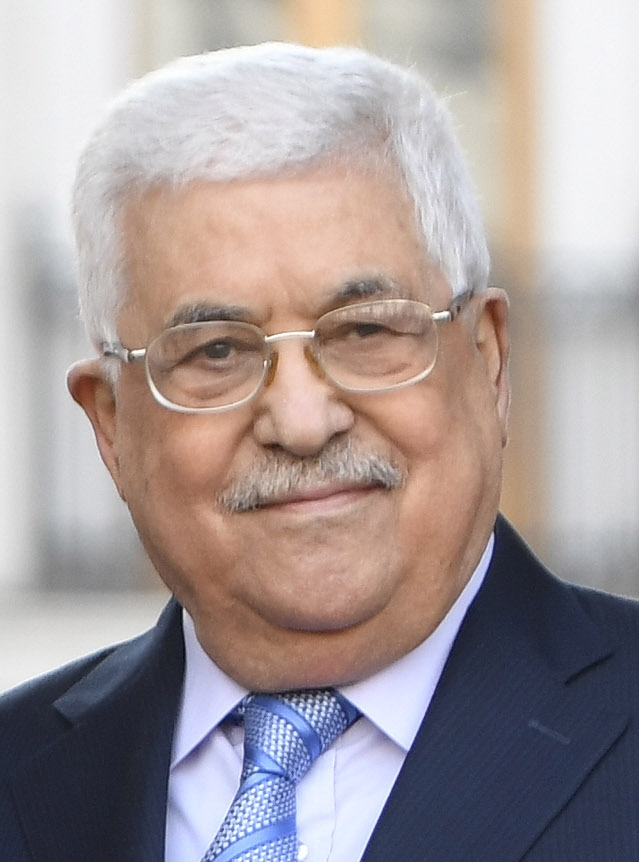
Mahmoud Abbas has not endorsed BDS.

The Palestinian leadership's position on BDS is ambivalent. President Mahmoud Abbas does not support a general boycott against Israel and has said that the Palestinians do not either. But he does support a boycott of goods produced in Israeli settlements, and the Palestinian Authority has used boycotts to gain leverage on Israel. For example, in 2015, it imposed a boycott on six major Israeli food manufacturers to retaliate against Israel for withholding Palestinian tax funds. The second-highest authority of the Palestine Liberation Organization (PLO), the Palestinian Central Council, has meanwhile announced its intention to:

Adopt the BDS movement and call on states around the world to impose sanctions on Israel to put an end to its flagrant violations of international law, its continued aggression against the Palestinian people, and to the apartheid regime [Israel has] imposed on them.

A few Palestinian scholars have opposed the academic boycott of Israel, including former Al-Quds University president Sari Nusseibeh, who acknowledges that his view is in the minority among his colleagues. Some Palestinian academics have criticized Nusseibeh's collaboration with Hebrew University, seeing it as a form of normalization. Matthew Kalman speculated in The New York Times that opposition to boycott is more widespread among Palestinian academics but that they are afraid to speak out.

Palestinian-Israeli video blogger Nas Daily has expressed opposition to boycotts of Israel. BDS has in turn denounced him for engaging in normalization.

=== International response ===
==== Africa ====
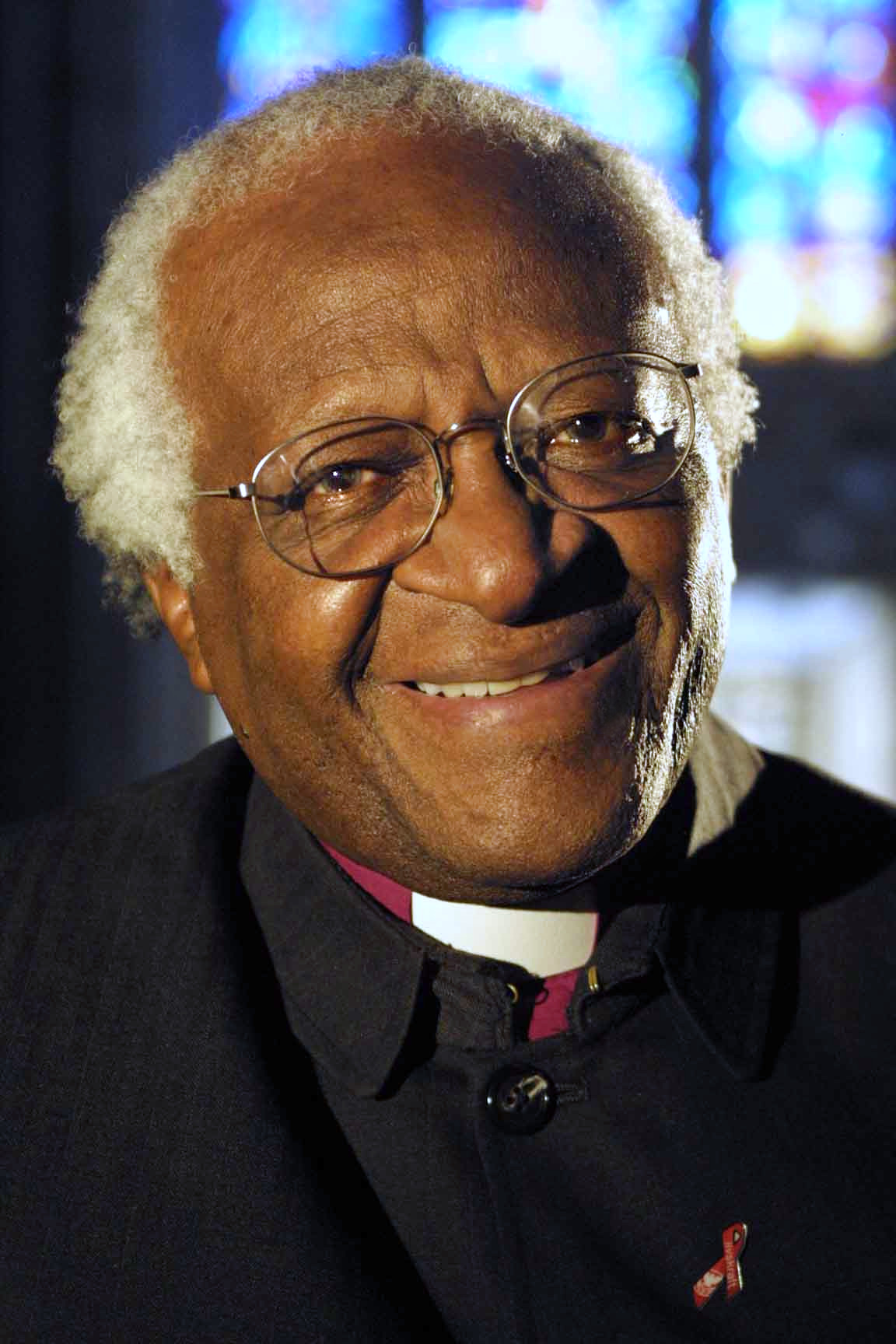
Desmond Tutu was a supporter of BDS.

South African organizations and public figures that were involved in the struggle against apartheid have supported BDS. Such support is symbolically important for BDS as it tries to position itself as the spiritual successor of the anti-apartheid movement. The South African archbishop Desmond Tutu, known for his anti-apartheid and human rights activism, endorsed BDS during his lifetime. He came to this decision after visiting the Palestinian territories, comparing the conditions there to conditions in apartheid-era South Africa, and suggesting that Palestinian goals should be achieved by the same means used in South Africa. Foxman criticized Tutu's statements, saying they conveyed "bigotry against the Jewish homeland and the Jewish people".

In 2012, the South African African National Congress (ANC) party gave BDS its blessing, saying, "the Palestinians are the victims and the oppressed in the conflict with Israel." The Congress of South African Trade Unions (COSATU) also supports BDS, fully endorsing it in 2011. During the 2014 Israel–Gaza conflict, COSATU vowed to "intensify" its support for BDS, picketing Woolworths for stocking Israeli goods.

==== North America ====
Canada's Québec solidaire supports BDS. The Green Party of Canada voted to endorse BDS in 2016, despite strong objections by its leader, Elizabeth May, who threatened to resign.

Both major U.S. political parties oppose BDS. American author Jonathan Schanzer of the Foundation for Defense of Democracies has said that there are links between BDS and American supporters of Hamas. In a 2016 congressional hearing, he said that some leaders of organizations that had been "designated, shut down, or held civilly liable for providing material support to the terrorist organization Hamas" appeared to have "pivoted to leadership positions within the American BDS campaign".

In 2017, all 50 U.S. state governors and the mayor of Washington, D.C., signed on to "Governors United Against BDS", an initiative sponsored by the American Jewish Committee that condemns BDS as "antithetical to our values and the values of our respective states" and emphasizes "our support for Israel as a vital U.S. ally, important economic partner and champion of freedom."

In 2023, the Democratic Socialists of America voted on a resolution to expel members "who have consistently and publicly opposed BDS, even after receiving fair and ample opportunity for education".

==== Oceania ====
Australia's NSW Greens has supported BDS. The Liberal Party of Australia opposes it.

==== Europe ====
Former British Prime Ministers Tony Blair, David Cameron, Theresa May, and Boris Johnson have all opposed or condemned boycotts of Israel. Former Spanish Prime Minister José María Aznar said that BDS applies a double standard to Israel and that it is therefore antisemitic. In his view, BDS wants to "empty" Israel of Jews.

On 17 May 2017, Israeli PM Benjamin Netanyahu encouraged Danish minister of foreign affairs Anders Samuelsen to stop funding Palestinian organizations supporting the BDS movement. Two days later, the Danish ministry of foreign affairs began an investigation of the 24 organizations in Israel and Palestine that Denmark supports. On 24 May, Netanyahu called Danish PM Lars Løkke Rasmussen to complain about Denmark's funding activities in the area.

In December 2017, the Danish ministry of foreign affairs announced that Denmark would fund fewer organizations and that the conditions for obtaining Danish funds needed to be "stricter and clearer". Venstre's foreign affairs spokesman Michael Aastrup Jensen said: "Israel has objected emphatically. And it is a problem that Israel sees it as a problem, so now we clear up the situation and change our support".

In a response to Ireland's progressing of the Control of Economic Activity (Occupied Territories) Bill 2018, Netanyahu condemned the bill as an attempt to support BDS and to "harm the State of Israel". According to the Israeli Foreign Ministry, the Irish ambassador said that the Irish government opposes BDS.

On 7 February 2019, Copenhagen mayor of technical and environmental affairs Ninna Hedeager Olsen of the Danish party Enhedslisten gave three BDS activists known as the Humboldt 3 an award for their work "to reveal the Apartheid-like nature of the Israeli regime and its systematic violation of international law."

===== Germany =====
In 2017, the Munich city council barred public funding or space for BDS supporters. A Munich resident filed a legal case against the council’s restrictions, but a lower court ruled in favour of the Munich council. The citizen appealed against that (lower) ruling, and won, in 2020. Subsequently, the city council took the case to the Federal Administrative Court in Leipzig, which in January 2022 again sided with the Munich citizen, stating that German law "guarantees everyone the right to freely express and disseminate their opinion."

In May 2017, the Berlin branch of the Social Democratic Party of Germany passed a resolution condemning BDS as antisemitic.

The German parliament has voted in 2019 to ‘define BDS as anti-Semitic’, which led to protests of 25 major German cultural institutes holding that "accusations of antisemitism are being misused" to silence important critical voices (see subsection #Cultural response).

A 2024 report by Germany's Federal Office for the Protection of the Constitution said BDS had "links to secular Palestinian extremism" and noted its support by groups Germany has designated as terrorist organizations, including Hamas and the Palestinian Islamic Jihad.

=== Trade union response ===
In April 2014, the UK's National Union of Teachers, the EU's largest teachers' union, passed a resolution backing boycotts against Israel. In July of that year, the UK's Unite the Union voted to join BDS.

In December 2014, UAW Local 2865, a local chapter of the United Auto Workers union representing over 14,000 workers at the University of California, adopted a resolution in support of BDS, with 65% of the vote in favor. It became the first major U.S. labor union to endorse BDS.

A year after the vote, the UAW International Executive Board (IEB) informed UAW Local 2865 that it had nullified the vote. The opposition to the BDS resolution came from a group called Informed Grads. Activist Ben Norton said that this group was represented by the global law firm Gibson, Dunn & Crutcher. According to Norton, IEB said that endorsing the boycott would interfere with the "flow of commerce to and from earmarked companies". UAW 2865's BDS Caucus repudiated the IEB's argument, saying that the IEB cared more about the "flow of commerce" than solidarity with Palestinian labor unions. Norton said that the IEB further alleged that the resolution was antisemitic; the BDS Caucus called the allegation "the same baseless accusations of anti-Semitism frequently attributed to anyone who is critical of Israel".

In April 2015, the Confédération des syndicats nationaux, Quebec, Canada, representing 325,000 workers in nearly 2,000 unions, voted to join the campaign for BDS and support a military embargo against Israel.

On 11 September 2019, the British Trades Union Congress passed a motion titled "Palestine: supporting rights to self-determination", called for the prioritization of "Palestinians' rights to justice and equality, including by applying these principles based on international law to all UK trade with Israel", and declared its opposition to "any proposed solution for Palestinians, including Trump's 'deal', not based on international law recognising their collective rights to self-determination and to return to their homes".

== Efforts to counter BDS ==
Sunaina Maira, Professor of Asian American Studies at UC Davis, alleged in 2018 that what she called the "Israel lobby" views BDS as a major threat to Israel and responds through organized advocacy and legal initiatives. U.S.-based groups, including the Israel Action Network and the Maccabee Task Force, were established to counter BDS, particularly on college campuses. Critics of BDS argue that the movement singles out Israel, rejects its right to exist as a Jewish state, and has contributed to a rise in antisemitic incidents. In response, 37 U.S. states have enacted anti-BDS laws aimed at preventing discrimination against Israel, promoting trade with it, and protecting Jewish and Israeli communities from the movement's perceived harmful effects.

=== In academia ===
According to Maira, pro-Israel groups use blacklisting to oppose BDS activists on campus, which she says can cause students and untenured faculty, who worry about reprisals and negative publicity, to refrain from activism. She says the best-known blacklist is the anonymous website Canary Mission, which publishes photos and personal information about students and faculty who promote BDS. The website has threatened to send students' names to prospective employees. According to the Intercept, the website has made it harder for activists to organize activities because people worry that they will end up on it. Activists listed on the site have reported receiving death threats. Another blacklist, according to Palestine Legal, was the now-defunct outlawbds.com, operated by the Israeli private intelligence agency Psy-Group. It sent threatening emails to BDS activists in New York, warning them that they had been identified as "BDS promoter[s]". Maira says many activists have attempted to defuse blacklisting's "chilling effect" by treating inclusion on blacklists as a badge of honor or by attempting to get themselves blacklisted.

The operators of the blacklists are often anonymous. According to Haaretz, the Canary Mission was funded by the Jewish Community Federation of San Francisco and the Jewish Community Foundation of Los Angeles, and operated by the Israeli nonprofit Megamot Shalom.

=== Anti-BDS laws and resolutions ===
In response to BDS, several legislatures have passed laws designed to hinder people and organizations from boycotting Israel and goods from Israeli settlements. Proponents of such laws say that they are necessary because BDS is a form of antisemitism. Modern boycott laws regarding Israel mirror those of apartheid-era South Africa but in reverse: governments once compelled compliance with South Africa boycotts but now prohibit participation in Israel boycotts, using tools like tax penalties, contract restrictions, and criminal liability. U.S. policy since the 1970s—through federal laws like the Ribicoff Amendment and Export Administration Amendments, as well as state-level legislation—has treated boycotts of Israel as discriminatory economic conduct, not protected expression, a view reinforced by bipartisan consensus and constitutional precedent. These laws pursue three goals: (1) preventing state resources from supporting boycotts of a key U.S. ally, (2) promoting trade with Israel, and (3) shielding Jews, Israelis, and Palestinians in Israeli-controlled areas from BDS's discriminatory effects. After passage of these laws, Dickinson, Texas, residents found they had to certify they would not boycott Israel in order to qualify for relief for damages caused by Hurricane Harvey; a math teacher in Kansas had to pledge not to boycott Israel to be paid her state salary; and an Arkansas newspaper was asked to sign an anti-boycott pledge to be paid for the advertising it ran for Arkansas State University.

David Kaye, the UN special rapporteur on the promotion and protection of the right to freedom of opinion and expression, has said that boycotts have long been regarded as a legitimate form of expression, that such legislation against BDS appears to "repress a particular political viewpoint" while failing international legal criteria for "permissible restraints on speech" insofar as these laws contradict Article 19(2) of the International Covenant on Civil and Political Rights (ICCPR), a covenant to which the United States is a signatory.

In the U.S., anti-BDS laws have been passed. Two federal acts have been introduced, the 2017 Israel Anti-Boycott Act and the 2019 Combating BDS Act, both intended to deprive entities participating in boycotts of Israel of government contract work. In several states, these laws have been challenged on First Amendment grounds for violating citizens' freedom of speech. Supporters of anti-BDS statutes say that boycotts are economic activity, not speech, and that laws prohibiting government contracts with groups that boycott Israel are similar to other anti-discrimination laws that have been upheld as constitutional under the Commerce Clause. Opponents, such as the ACLU, contend that the laws are not analogous to anti-discrimination legislation because they target only boycotts of Israel. Texas, Kansas, and Arizona have amended their anti-BDS laws in response to lawsuits. In a 2022 University of Maryland Critical Issues Poll, 68% of respondents said they opposed laws criminalizing boycotts of Israel.

Following the Russian invasion of Ukraine in 2022, critics of the Israeli government pointed out that several U.S. politicians who supported sanctions against Russia and the boycott of Russia and Belarus had previously campaigned for and passed anti-BDS laws punishing boycotts of Israel.

Israel has enacted two anti-BDS laws: one in 2011 that criminalizes calls to boycott Israel, and one in 2017 that prohibits foreigners who call for such boycotts from entering Israel or its settlements. In 2019, Israel caused some controversy by denying entry to two BDS-supporting U.S. Representatives, Rashida Tlaib and Ilhan Omar.

Following the October 7 attacks in 2023, the American Legislative Exchange Council (ALEC) became a leader in drafting model legislation in over 30 US states opposing BDS actions against Israel. In 2024, Israeli scholar and activist Neve Gordon said the bills "shield Israel from Palestinian-led efforts to mobilize against the crime of apartheid."

=== Designation as "suspected extremist threat" in Germany ===
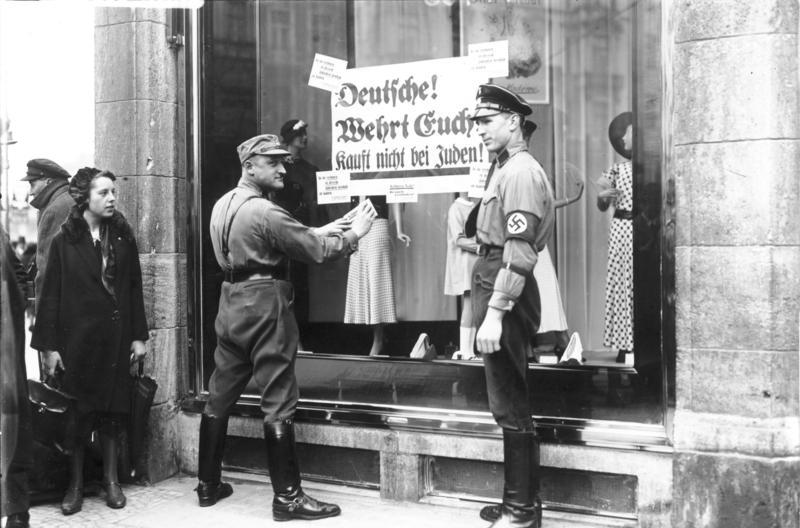
SA paramilitaries outside a Berlin store on 1 April 1933 during the Nazi boycott of Jewish businesses. The sign reads: "Germans! Defend yourselves! Don't buy from Jews!"

In June 2024, the German Federal Office for the Protection of the Constitution (BfV) first classified the BDS campaign against Israel as a suspected extremist threat. The agency, dedicated to fighting neo-Nazi and domestic extremist threats, investigated BDS after Hamas's October 7 attacks on Israel, after which BDS-affiliated groups intensified anti-Israel protests.

In Germany, the BDS movement is often compared to the Nazi boycott of Jewish businesses and considered "nothing less than the start of a road to another Holocaust". Peace researcher Gert Krell has called this comparison "highly questionable, if not pure demagogy", writing that it conflates objecting to a military occupation with targeting a powerless minority in a totalitarian state. Protections of freedom of expression limit the ability to block BDS, but anti-BDS efforts have had a significant effect.

=== Israel's countermeasures ===
From 2016 to 2019, Israel allocated over $100 million in funding to counter BDS, which it considers a strategic threat. In 2016, Israel's ambassador to the UN, Danny Danon, stated that Israel was in many countries "so that it will simply be illegal to boycott Israel." In 2020, it was revealed that an Israeli state-funded lobby group had been instrumental in pushing for anti-BDS laws in many U.S. states.

In 2018, a new code of ethics was adopted for Israeli universities. The code prohibits faculty from calling for or participating in boycotts of Israel.

In 2010, the Israeli think tank Reut Institute (Note: Later renamed to Reut Group.) presented a paper, "The Delegitimization Challenge: Creating a Political Firewall", at the influential Herzliya Conference. It recommended enlisting intelligence agencies to attack and sabotage what it believed where international "hubs" of the movement in London, Madrid, Toronto, and other cities. In a related paper, the think tank called for pro-Israel advocates to "out, name and shame" Israel's critics and to "frame them ... as anti-peace, anti-Semitic, or dishonest purveyors of double standards."

In a leaked report from 2017, "The Assault On Israel's Legitimacy The Frustrating 20X Question: Why Is It Still Growing?", Reut recommended making a distinction between hardcore anti-Zionist "instigators" and the "long tail": people who are critical of Israel but do not seek its "elimination". The instigators should be "handled uncompromisingly, publicly or covertly", the report stated, but the long tail should be won over by persuasion, as a heavy-handed approach would risk driving them closer to the "anti-Israel camp".

==== Ministry of Strategic Affairs ====
In Israel, the counter-campaign was led by the Ministry of Strategic Affairs until 2021. In 2015, Israeli Prime Minister Benjamin Netanyahu announced that the ministry would receive over 100 million shekels and ten employees to fight BDS. Some of the funds have been used to buy space in the Israeli press to promote anti-BDS messages.

In June 2016, Haaretz reported that the ministry was going to establish a "dirty tricks" unit to "establish, hire or tempt nonprofit organizations or groups not associated with Israel, in order to disseminate" negative information about BDS supporters. The news came on the heels of a report that Israel's efforts to fight BDS had been ineffectual, in part because the responsibility had been transferred to the Strategic Affairs Ministry from the Foreign Ministry. "Despite receiving expanded authority in 2013 to run the government's campaign against the delegitimization and boycott efforts against Israel, the Strategic Affairs Ministry did not make full use of its budget and had no significant achievements in this area," Haaretz quotes the report as saying. "In 2015, it still did not carry out its work plans." In 2017, the cabinet allocated 128 million shekels over three years for a front company but it spent only 13 million with little to show by way of results.

In March 2017, Strategic Affairs Minister Gilad Erdan proposed establishing a database of Israeli citizens who support BDS. Attorney General Avichai Mandelblit objected, saying that only Israeli counterintelligence, Shin Bet, has the legal authority to monitor citizens in such a manner. Arab Israeli Knesset member Ayman Odeh slammed the idea, saying the government was afraid of a nonviolent struggle against occupation. The plan was not implemented.

In 2019, the ministry announced that its economic campaign against BDS had shut down 30 financial accounts of BDS-promoting groups. In October 2020, +972 Magazine reported that the Ministry of Strategic Affairs paid The Jerusalem Post over NIS 100,000 in 2019 to publish a special supplement titled Unmasking BDS in order to delegitimise the BDS movement. The ministry was closed down in 2021 by the 36th government and merged into the Ministry of Foreign Affairs.

==== Concert ====
Concert operated as a joint venture with the now closed Ministry for Strategic Affairs but failed in its objective to promote public diplomacy of Israel. In January 2022, it was decided to restart Concert and allocate $31 million over four years with matching contributions sourced from civil organizations.

==== Harassment of BDS activists ====
The Israeli government has threatened and harassed BDS activists.

In September 2009, Mohammed Othman was detained after returning from a trip to Norway where he discussed BDS with Norwegian officials. He was released after four months, after an international campaign in which Amnesty International threatened to declare him a prisoner of conscience. BNC member Jamal Juma was also detained for several weeks in 2009. No charges were leveled against either of them.

In March 2016, Israeli minister Yisrael Katz stated that Israel should employ "targeted civil eliminations" against BDS leaders. According to Amnesty International, the term alluded to the policy of targeted assassinations that Israel uses against members of Palestinian armed groups. Erdan called for BDS leaders to "pay the price" for their work. In response, Amnesty International issued a statement expressing its concern about the safety and liberty of Barghouti and other BDS activists. Barghouti has been the target of several travel bans and in 2019 the Israeli government announced that it was preparing to expel him.

In July 2020, Israeli soldiers arrested Mahmoud Nawajaa, General Coordinator of BNC, in his home near Ramallah and detained him for 19 days.

==== Brand Israel ====
Academics Rhys Crilley and Ilan Manor have said that "as long as the Israeli-Palestinian conflict endures so Israel's global reputation will become poorer" and cite a number of global surveys, including the 2006 Nation Brand Index, which found that "Israel is the worst brand in the world...Israel's brand is by a considerable margin the most negative we have ever measured" due to its long-running conflict with the Palestinians, which, in combination with BDS activities, has led to its being increasingly associated with apartheid and war crimes. The Israeli government initiated "Brand Israel", a campaign to improve Israel's image by showing its "prettier face", downplaying religion, and avoiding discussing the conflict with the Palestinians.

Brand Israel promotes Israeli culture abroad and also seeks to influence "opinion-formers" by inviting them on free trips to Israel. BDS attempts to counter the campaign by urging people not to participate in its activities. For example, in 2016 the Israeli government offered 26 Oscars-nominated celebrities 10-day free trips to Israel worth at least $15,000 to $18,000 per person. BDS activists took out an ad reading "#SkipTheTrip. Don't endorse Israeli apartheid" and urged the celebrities not to go.

=== Effectiveness ===
BDS considers the Israeli government's designation of the movement as a "strategic threat" proof of its success. Barghouti said that the only effect Israel's heavy-handed measures will have is to speed the end of Israel's occupation and apartheid policies, and that its attempt to crush BDS will fail. He said that BDS has dragged Israel into a "battlefield" over human rights, where its massive arsenal of intimidation, smears, threats, and bullying is rendered as ineffective as its nuclear weapons. According to Barghouti, Israel's extremism and its willingness to sacrifice its last masks of "democracy" will only help BDS grow.

Hitchcock speculates that many counter-measures might backfire, especially if they are seen as infringing on the right to free speech. As an example, she gives Trump's 2019 order to federal agencies to use a definition of antisemitism that includes speech critical of Israel when investigating certain types of discrimination complaints. Critics contended that the intent was to crack down on pro-BDS campus activism, and their critique found its way into mainstream periodicals like The New York Times, The New Yorker, and the Los Angeles Times.

A 2022 Pew Research Center poll found that 84% of Americans did not know much about BDS. Of the 15% that knew something about the movement, only a third supported it.

== Jews and the BDS movement ==
Only 10% of American Jews support the BDS movement, according to a 2020 Pew Research poll, but almost a quarter of American Jews under 40 support boycotting Israeli products, according to a 2020 J Street poll. Sina Arnold believes that the difference signals that young progressive American Jews identify with Israel less strongly than older generations. Jewish activists have sometimes played central roles in BDS campaigns, something Barghouti suggests refutes the antisemitism allegation against the movement. Maia Hallward attributes BDS's Jewish support to two factors: the long history of social justice activism among Jews and the desire among activists to defuse allegations of antisemitism. Arnold calls it a "form of strategic essentialism", where Jewish activists make themselves visible or are made visible by others.

Jewish BDS activists have had their Jewish credentials questioned by other Jews, and some have reported being called "self-hating Jews", "Nazis", or "traitors". The rabbi David Wolpe has said that Jewish BDS supporters should be shunned:

Those Jews who support BDS, or deny the legitimacy of the State of Israel, have no place at the table. They should not be invited to speak at synagogues and churches, universities and other institutions that respect rational discourse. They should have the same intellectual status as Klansmen: purveyors of hate.

Philip Mendes distinguishes those Jews who recognize Palestinian rights and support Jewish-Arab dialogue from those "unrepresentative token Jews" whom BDS use as an alibi. David Hirsh has written, "Jews too can make anti-Semitic claims ... and play an important, if unwitting, part in preparing the ground for the future emergence of anti-Semitic movement." Noa Tishby wrote, "As Judaism always takes sides with human rights and encourages dissent, I am all for speaking against the Israeli government's policies when you don't like them. But when [Jewish university] students ... cry in support of BDS, I'm not sure what the goal really is, and I am pretty sure they don't know either." According to the ADL, Jewish Voice for Peace (JVP) uses its Jewish identity to lend credibility to the anti-Israel movement. JVP says its activism is rooted in Jewish values.

=== Allegations of antisemitism ===
There is no agreement on whether BDS is antisemitic. The Simon Wiesenthal Center (SWC), Israeli politicians, and others have called it antisemitic. In 2019, the German Parliament voted to declare that BDS is antisemitic and cut off funding to any organizations that actively support it. In passing the bill, some lawmakers said some BDS slogans were reminiscent of Nazi propaganda. In 2021, a group of over 200 scholars published the Jerusalem Declaration on Antisemitism, which says that boycotting Israel is not in itself antisemitic. The lead drafters are antisemitism scholars in the U.S., Israel, Germany, and Britain.

==== Allegations that BDS targets Jews ====
In 2019, the German Bundestag passed a resolution stating that BDS was "reminiscent of the most terrible chapter in German history" and that it triggered memories of the Nazi slogan "Don't buy from Jews". American lawyer Alan Dershowitz has argued similarly that BDS and historical boycotts against Jews are comparable. Barghouti has said that BDS does not target Jews because boycott targets are selected based on their complicity in Israel's human rights violations, potential for cross-movement solidarity, media appeal, and likelihood of success, rather than their national origin or religious identity, with the majority of companies targeted being non-Israeli companies operating in Israel and Palestine.

According to Ira M. Sheskin of the University of Miami and Ethan Felson of the Jewish Council for Public Affairs, BDS efforts have at times targeted Jewish people who have little or nothing to do with the Israeli–Palestinian conflict. They say that BDS causes Jews to be blamed for the supposed sins of other Jews. The AMCHA Initiative said there is a "strong correlation" between BDS support and antisemitism on U.S. campuses.

==== Conflating antisemitism with anti-Zionism ====
BDS supporters frequently allege that accusations of antisemitism against them misrepresent their position by conflating anti-Zionism or criticism of Israel with hostility to Jews. Judith Butler and Barghouti say that opposition to BDS rests partly on the assumption that Jews are uniformly supportive of Israel, an idea they see as inaccurate and harmful.

Human Rights Watch's Wenzel Michalski has said that it is indisputable that some antisemites use the term "Israel" or "Zionist" in place of "Jews", and that this must be "called out". But he adds that depicting boycotts of Israel as antisemitic is misplaced, a flawed way to counter antisemitism. Anti-boycott legislation is, in this view, tantamount to punishing companies that follow their international legal responsibilities by complying with the United Nations Guiding Principles on Business and Human Rights that require them to stop operating in settlements.

== See also ==
- Anti-BDS laws
- Criticism of the Israeli government
- Disinvestment from Israel
- Reactions to Boycott, Divestment and Sanctions
- Writers Against the War on Gaza
- List of sanctions involving Israel
- List of companies involved in the Gaza war
- Arms embargoes on Israel since 2023
