= Snitz =

Snitz may refer to:

- Snitz Edwards (1868–1937), American stage and silent film actor born Edward Neumann
- Edmund L. Gruber (1879–1941), US Army general and military music composer, author of "The Caissons Go Rolling Along"
- Snitz Snider, Samford Bulldogs men's basketball head coach (1942–1943) and sprinter - see 1928 NCAA Track and Field Championships
- Gerald Snyder (1905–1983), American National Football League player
- Kobi Snitz, mathematician and a leading member of the Boycott from Within association
- Snitz Creek, Quentin, Pennsylvania, United States
