= Who Profits Research Center =

Independent research center

Who Profits?
- Founded: 2007
- Type: Non-profit organization
- Purpose: "dedicated to exposing the role of the private sector in the Israeli occupation economy"
- Region served: Israel and the Palestinian territories
- Method: Online database of complicit corporations, online information center, and publication of regular reports on the corporate aspects of the occupation.
- Key people: Dalit Baum, Merav Amir
- Website: whoprofits.org

Who Profits Research Center is an independent research center which investigates links between the private sector and the economy in the Israeli-occupied territories. The Center was founded in 2007 as a project by the Israeli Coalition of Women for Peace and became independent in 2013. The director of Who Profits?, Dalit Baum, explains the idea as follows:

We do know that nobody likes corporations profiting from human rights violations...we know that the occupation is costly but it is costly to the state, while the economy is benefitting through the private sector, following the privatisation of the 1990s...so maybe by focusing on the corporations, we can find a new audience and new allies because corporations are not people and because corporate crime goes in many different directions and many people suffer from it

On its website Who Profits? keeps an updated database of Israeli and international corporations involved in the occupation. The database is often consulted by the BDS movement when selecting boycott targets.

Who Profits? has published reports about Israeli cosmetics manufacturer Ahava, the international security giant G4S, and the rental online marketplace Airbnb.

== See also ==
- Boycott from Within

== Sources ==
- "Ahava: Tracking the Trade Trail of Settlement Products". whoprofits.org. Who Profits?. April 2012.
- Barghouti, Omar (2011). BDS: Boycott, Divestment, Sanctions: the Global Struggle for Palestinian Rights. Haymarket Books. ISBN 978-1-60846-114-1.
- "The Case of G4S: Private Security Companies and the Israeli Occupation" (PDF). whoprofits.org. Who Profits?.
- Fleischmann, Leonie (19 September 2019). The Israeli Peace Movement: Anti-Occupation Activism and Human Rights since the Al-Aqsa Intifada. Bloomsbury Publishing. pp. 41–. ISBN 978-1-83860-098-3.
- "Foundation for Middle East Peace". Foundation for Middle East Peace. 11 March 2019.
- Harlow, Barbara (Fall 2015). ""Be it Resolved …": Referenda on Recent Scholarship in the Israel–Palestine Conflict". Cultural Critique. 91: 190–205. doi:10.5749/culturalcritique.91.2015.0190. JSTOR 10.5749/culturalcritique.91.2015.0190.
- Hass, Amira (16 July 2012). "Disney family member renounces her investments in Israel's Ahava Cosmetics". Haaretz. Archived from the original on 23 August 2018.
- "Touring Israeli Settlements: Business and Pleasure for the Economy of Occupation" (PDF). whoprofits.org. Who Profits?.
- "Who Profits Research Center". whoprofits.
