= Reut Group =

Israeli think tank and lobby group

- Founded: 2004; 22 years ago
- Founders: Gidi Grinstein
- Headquarters: Tel Aviv, Israel
- Website: www.reutgroup.org/home

The Reut Group (formerly known as the Reut Institute) is a non-profit policy think tank and Israeli lobby organization in Tel Aviv. It was founded by Gidi Grinstein in January 2004.

== ADL-Reut report ==
In February 2016, the Anti-Defamation League (ADL) and the Reut Institute announced a joint initiative to counter the BDS movement (an organization that calls for comprehensive boycotts against Israel similar to those levied against the South African apartheid regime in order to end its alleged violations of Palestinian human rights) and delegitimization of Israel. The collaboration led to a secret report that the Jewish American magazine The Forward in February 2017 reported was "circulating privately in Jewish policy circles." The 30-page report was leaked in April and published on the pro-Palestinian website The Electronic Intifada. The report titled "The Assault On Israel's Legitimacy The Frustrating 20X Question: Why Is It Still Growing?" discussed the growth of the BDS movement and suggested strategies to combat it. The 20X question referred to the report's estimates that pro-Israel groups have increased their spending to combat the BDS movement 20-fold over the last six years yet "results remain elusive."

The report described the wave of anti-BDS legislation that had swept across the US which it attributed to the pro-Israel network. Asking "How Far Should We Take Anti-BDS Legislation?" the report warns that "Legislative initiatives in a number of states have raised concerns regarding their possible violation of free speech. Future legislation need to be developed with careful consideration of this issue to avoid the potential for rallying progressive groups in coordinated opposition and "turning off" the long tail." The report also suggested harsh treatment of "instigators": "The instigators must be singled out from the other groups, and handled uncompromisingly, publicly or covertly as possible."

== Activities ==
The goal of the Reut Institute is to "identify the gaps in current policy and strategy in Israel and the Jewish world, and work to build and implement new visions." Reut describes itself as a strategy group that supplies its services pro bono to Israeli government decision-makers.

Israel 15 Vision is a model developed by Reut to close social and economic gaps through programs focusing on different aspects of the Israeli society, from historical sites to innovative technologies.

In the United States, the Reut Institute is backed up by the organization the American Friends of the Reut Institute.

In 2025, Reut published an 11 Point Agenda for Renewal of American Jewry. In March 2026, Reut convened Jewish leaders for conference titled AJ2026 to discuss the 11 Point Agenda with an eye toward planning for 2054 which will mark 400 years since Jews first arrived in New Amsterdam.

== Reports ==
- Building a Political Firewall Against Israel's Delegitimization, 2010
