= Cary Nelson =

American academic

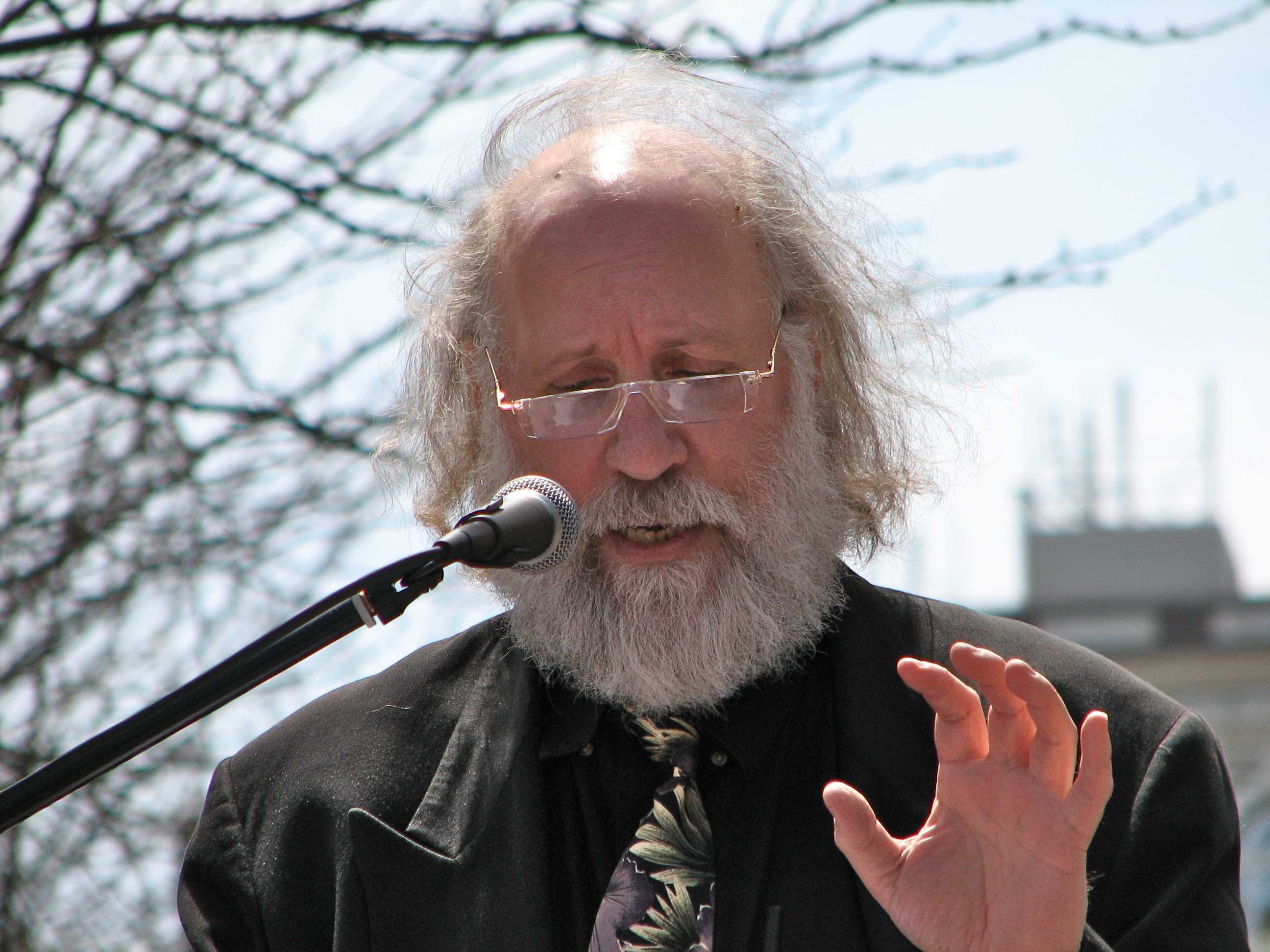
Nelson speaking against casualization of academic labor at Yale University

Cary Nelson (born 1946) is an American professor emeritus of English and Jubilee Professor of Liberal Arts and Sciences at the University of Illinois at Urbana-Champaign. He was president of the American Association of University Professors between 2006 and 2012.

== Education ==
In 1967, Nelson graduated from Antioch College. In 1970, he received a Ph.D. in English from the University of Rochester.

== Career ==
Since the 1990s, Nelson has increasingly focused on issues in higher education. In the words of Alan Wald, "With the appearance of Manifesto of a Tenured Radical in 1997. Nelson became an example of the committed scholar who conceived of the advance of his own career in the context of the amelioration of the rank-and-file of the academic community; more specifically, graduate students, part-time employees, and campus workers."

From 2000 to 2006, Nelson was the second vice president of the American Association of University Professors (AAUP). He was elected to a two-year term as president and was re-elected until 2012. In April 2006, Nelson was arrested, along with over 50 others, including Jane Buck, the outgoing president of the AAUP, as part of a unionization effort by New York University's graduate teaching assistants.

In 2014, Nelson supported the University of Illinois' decision to withdrawn a job offer to Steven Salaita, an "American studies scholar active in the Israel boycott movement."

== Published works ==
As of 2024, Nelson is an Inside Higher Ed columnist. He has published or edited 25 books, including Manifesto of a Tenured Radical and Revolutionary Memory: Recovering the Poetry of the American Left.

Nelson's academic focus is on modern American poetry. He has also published books criticizing boycotts of Israel, including the BDS movement.

== Bibliography ==
- The Incarnate Word: Literature as Verbal Space. University of Illinois Press, 1973. ISBN 978-0252001918
- No University Is an Island: Saving Academic Freedom. New York University Press, 2010. ISBN 978-0-8147-5859-5
- The Case Against Academic Boycotts of Israel (edited, with Gabriel Noah Brahm). Wayne State Press, 2015. ISBN 978-0-9903316-0-5
- Israel Denial: Anti-Zionism, Anti-Semitism, and the Faculty Campaign Against the Jewish State. Indiana University Press, 2019.
- Hate Speech and Academic Freedom: The Antisemitic Assault on Basic Principles. Academic Studies Press, 2024.
