= Jewish lobby =

Organized advocacy by Jewish community

The Jewish lobby are individuals and groups predominantly in the Jewish diaspora that advocate for the interests of Jews and Jewish values. The lobby references the involvement and influence of Jews in politics and the political process, and is said to include organized groups such as the American Jewish Committee, the American Israel Public Affairs Committee, B'nai B'rith, and the Anti-Defamation League.

Although both terms are controversial, term Jewish lobby is often conflated with the term Israel lobby, which some commentators argue against. While there is some overlap in alleged membership between the Jewish lobby and the Israel lobby, the two terms should not be interchangeable, as the Jewish lobby is defined by its ethnic makeup, while the Israel lobby is defined by its political agenda.

The term is common in antisemitic contexts, where it is used pejoratively to allege, falsely and without evidence, disproportionate Jewish influence in politics and government, a variation of the old antisemitic canard of "international Jewish conspiracy".

== History ==
On November 11, 1906, 81 Jewish Americans of Central European background met in the Hotel Savoy in New York City to establish the American Jewish Committee (AJC). The immediate impetus for the group's formation was to speak on behalf of American Jewry to the U.S. government about pressuring Tsarist Russia to stop pogroms against Jews in the Russian Empire. AJC also fought limitations to immigration to the United States and combating manifestations of antisemitism. The official statement announcing its formation called to "prevent infringement of the civil and religious rights of Jews and to alleviate the consequences of persecution."

Tivnan writes that a "full-fledged 'Jewish lobby'" was developed in 1943, in which the moderates represented by Stephen Samuel Wise and the American Jewish Committee were defeated by supporters of Abba Hillel Silver and "the maximalist goal of a 'Jewish Commonwealth'" at the American Jewish and Biltmore Conferences. Silver became the new leader of American Zionism, with his call for "loud diplomacy", and he then "cranked up the Zionist Organization of America's one-man lobbying operation in Washington—renaming it the American Zionist Emergency Council (AZEC)—and began to mobilize American Jewry into a mass movement."

== Description ==
In the 1992 Dictionary of Politics, political scientist Walter John Raymond describes the term "Jewish Lobby" as approximately 34 Jewish political organizations in the United States which make joint and separate efforts to lobby for their interests in the United States, as well as for the interests of the State of Israel." Raymond listed the American Israel Public Affairs Committee (AIPAC), the American Jewish Committee, and B'nai B'rith among the component members of the Jewish lobby.

Journalist J.J. Goldberg, editor-in-chief of The Forward, described the organized Jewish lobby in the early 21st century as not only the approximately dozen organizations such as AIPAC, the Anti-Defamation League (ADL), the American Jewish Committee, and Hadassah, but also high levels of participation of Jews in electoral politics.

In his book Jewish Power, Goldberg writes that in the United States the "Jewish lobby" for decades played a leadership role in formulating American policy on issues such as civil rights, separation of church and state, and immigration, guided by a liberalism that was a complex mixture of Jewish tradition, the experience of persecution, and self-interest. It was thrust into prominence following the Nixon Administration's sharp shift of American policy towards significant military and foreign aid support for Israel following the 1973 Yom Kippur War.

University of Chicago professor John Mearsheimer and Harvard University professor Stephen Walt wrote in 2006 that "even the Israeli media refer to America's 'Jewish Lobby'", and stated the following year that "AIPAC and the Conference of Presidents and the Israeli media themselves refer to America's 'Jewish Lobby'."

Dominique Vidal, writing in Le Monde diplomatique, states that in the United States the term is "self-described" and it "is only one of many influence groups that have official standing with institutions and authorities."

Former New York Times journalist Youssef Ibrahim writes: "That there is a Jewish lobby in America concerned with the well-being of Israel is a silly question. It is insane to ask whether the 6 million American Jews should be concerned about the 6 million Israeli Jews, particularly in view of the massacre of another 6 million Jews in the Holocaust. It's elementary, my dear Watson: Any people who do not care for their own are not worthy of concern. And what the Israel lobby does is what all ethnic lobbies — Greek, Armenian, Latvian, Irish, Cuban, and others — do in this democracy."

== Comparison with "Israel lobby" ==
Commentators argue that "Jewish lobby" should not be used interchangeably with the term "pro-Israel lobby". Academic Dov Waxman notes that due to the large number of evangelical Christian Zionists involved in pro-Israel activities, the term "pro-Israel lobby" should be used when referring to organizations that try to influence American policy toward Israel in a certain direction. In addition, Waxman notes that the pro-Israel lobby is defined by its political agenda, rather than its ethnic or religious makeup, as the pro-Israel lobby does not necessarily reflect the views of American Jews. Historian Douglas Little notes that although American Jews play key roles in the pro-Israel lobby, it is not a "Jewish lobby" due to the involvement of diverse populations and groups.

Mitchell Bard, director of the non-profit Jewish Virtual Library, writes that: "Reference is often made to the 'Jewish lobby' in an effort to describe Jewish influence, but this term is both vague and inadequate. While it is true that American Jews are sometimes represented by lobbyists, such direct efforts to influence policy-makers are but a small part of the lobby's ability to shape policy." Bard argues the term Israel lobby is more accurate, because it comprises both formal and informal elements (which includes public opinion), and "...because a large proportion of the lobby is made up of non-Jews." In his 1987 work, The Lobby: Jewish Political Power and American Foreign Policy, Edward Tivnan states that the term "needed some fine-tuning; what was most at issue... was the influence of the 'pro-Israel lobby.'"

University of Chicago professor John Mearsheimer and Harvard University professor Stephen Walt, authors of the controversial 2007 book The Israel Lobby and U.S. Foreign Policy rejected using the label "Jewish lobby" interchangeably for the Israel lobby as inaccurate and misleading, both because the Israel lobby included non-Jews like Christian Zionists and because they said many Jewish Americans do not support the hard-line policies favored by the Israel lobby's "most powerful elements". They stated they "never use the term 'Jewish lobby' because the lobby is defined by its political agenda, not by religion or ethnicity." Walt added in Foreign Policy that using the "Jewish lobby" to talk about pro-Israel groups "is both inaccurate and inevitably conjures up dangerous stereotypes".

== Antisemitic associations ==
The term may be used pejoratively to allege disproportionate Jewish influence in politics and government and such usage is an element of antisemitism. Scholar Robert S. Wistrich noted in 2004 that calls for the destruction of Israel increasingly relied on antisemitic stereotyping of classic canards, including the "manipulative Jewish lobby". Wistrich saw references to the phrase, when used to describe an "all-powerful 'Jewish Lobby' that prevents justice in the Middle East", as relying on a classic antisemitic stereotype.

Bruno Bettelheim detested the term, arguing "The self-importance of Jews combined with the paranoia of the anti-Semite had created the image of this lobby." Michael Lasky describes the term as an "unfortunate phrase", and "imagines" that Alexander Walker's use of it while writing about the Nazi films of Leni Riefenstahl was not intended pejoratively.

The B'nai B'rith Anti-Defamation Commission of Australia states that "the stereotype of the 'Jewish lobby' is that the Jewish engagement in politics and policy debate is above and beyond the ordinary participation of a group in public policy-making. It paints Jewish involvement as surreptitious, and as subverting the democratic process. It alleges that a 'Jewish lobby', through bribery, bullying and manipulation, pressures politicians to act against their will and duties." The commission also stated that "just as other communities and interest groups have lobbies, there is a 'Jewish lobby' – an unwieldy group of individuals and organisations devoted to supporting the needs and interests of the Jewish community.

Michael Visontay, editor of Australia's The Sydney Morning Herald, wrote in 2003 that "The way the phrase 'Jewish lobby' has been bandied about in numerous letters implies there is something inherently sinister in lobbying when Jews do it." According to Geoffrey Brahm Levey and Philip Mendes, the term is used in Australia as a pejorative description of the way in which the Jewish community influences the Liberal Party "by talking to its leaders and making them aware of Jewish wishes and views".

Dominique Schnapper, Chantal Bordes-Benayoun and Freddy Raphaėl write that following the 1991 Gulf War, the term "began to be heard in political life" in France. Vidal writes that the term has been used there exclusively by the French far right as "a phrase that combines standard anti-semitic fantasies about Jewish finance, media control and power; the term is the contemporary equivalent of the Protocols of the Elders of Zion". Loyola University Chicago professor Wiley Feinstein wrote in 2003 that "there is much talk of the 'Jewish lobby' in the Italian Press and in Europe", describing the term as "a phrase of scorn for Jews and Judaism".

William Safire wrote that in the United Kingdom "Jewish lobby" was used as an "even more pejorative" term for "the 'Israel lobby'". He added that supporters of Israel gauge the degree of perceived animus towards Israel by the term chosen to refer to the pro-Israel lobby: "pro-Israel lobby" being used by those with the mildest opposition, followed by "Israel lobby", with the term "Jewish lobby" being employed by those with the most virulent anti-Israel opinions.

Susan Jacobs of Manchester Metropolitan University writes that the phrase "Jewish lobby", when used "without mentioning other 'lobbies' or differentiating Jews who have different political positions on a number of questions, including Israel and Palestine", is a contemporary form of the fear of a Jewish conspiracy.

== Contemporary use ==
Academic Gilbert Achcar, writing in the Journal of Palestine Studies, notes that modern Holocaust denial in the Western world rests on the trope that the Jewish genocide was a fraud promoted by an "international Jewish lobby". Achcar notes the prevalence in the Arab world that an "omnipotent Jewish lobby," rather than the Israel lobby, dictates Western policies toward the Middle East.

After South African activist, Christian cleric, and Nobel Peace Prize winner Desmond Tutu used it in a 1985 speech at the Jewish Theological Seminary of America, a supporter wrote him privately urging him to avoid the phrase, stating it was "language... normally associated with the less than philo-Semitic elements of our acquaintance". Tutu used the phrase again in a 2002 editorial in The Guardian, stating "People are scared in this country [the US], to say wrong is wrong because the Jewish lobby is powerful – very powerful. Well, so what? For goodness sake, this is God's world!" When he edited and reprinted parts of his speech in 2005, Tutu replaced the words "Jewish lobby" with "pro-Israeli lobby". In 2007, an invitation to Tutu to speak at the University of St. Thomas in Minnesota was rescinded because of the speech; writing in Mother Jones, Justin Elliot stated "Tutu's use of the phrase 'Jewish lobby' is regrettable, mainly because the pro-Israel lobby he is referring to is not made up exclusively of Jews, example Texas preacher John Hagee's Christians United for Israel. But one minor slip five years ago is hardly grounds for blacklisting him."

Chris Davies, MEP for the northwest of England was forced to resign in 2006 as leader of the Liberal Democrats group in the European Parliament after writing to a constituent "I shall denounce the influence of the Jewish lobby that seems to have far too great a say over the political decision-making process in many countries." In comments to TotallyJewish.Com he "confessed he didn't know the difference between referring to the 'pro Israel lobby' and the 'Jewish lobby'," and added "I'm quite prepared to accept that I don't understand the semantics of some of these things." Commenting on Davies' use of the term, David Hirsh of The Guardian wrote that Davies "had to resign because his laudable instinct to side with the underdog was not tempered by care, thought or self-education." He contrasted Davies' rhetoric with the "care to avoid openly antisemitic rhetoric taken by sophisticates like Mearsheimer and Walt and Robert Fisk."

A 2007 editorial in The New York Sun accused Richard Dawkins, a British evolutionary biologist and writer, of repeating antisemitic conspiracy theories after he used the term in an interview published in The Guardian. In the interview Dawkins said: "When you think about how fantastically successful the Jewish lobby has been, though, in fact, they are less numerous I am told – religious Jews anyway – than atheists and [yet they] more or less monopolise American foreign policy as far as many people can see. So if atheists could achieve a small fraction of that influence, the world would be a better place." In a National Review column discussing the influence of "high-profile atheists" on the American left, Arthur C. Brooks wrote that Dawkins' claim was "anti-Semitic, slanders religion, and asserts victimhood." David Cesarani, commenting in The Guardian, stated that "Mearsheimer and Walt would doubtless chide Dawkins for using the term 'Jewish lobby', which they studiously avoid in order to give no truck to anti-Jewish innuendo."

In 2012 Pertti Salolainen, former MP, minister and chairman of the National Coalition Party told Yle that the Jewish lobby of the United States controls the money and media "to a large degree" and the United States sides with Israel due to the power of this lobby. The Simon Wiesenthal Center demanded that Salolainen be fired from all positions and an apology from Finnish Foreign Ministry. Salolainen in return demanded apology from Simon Wiesenthal Center, and pointed out that he said the supposed control of media and banks is only to "a large degree".

After her appointment in 2022 as the United Nations Special Rapporteur on the occupied Palestinian territories, Francesca Albanese expressed regret about 2014 comments saying that the United States was "subjugated by the Jewish lobby" with regard to America's policy toward the Israel-Palestine conflict. Miloon Kothari, member of a UN Commission of Inquiry investigating abuses in Israel and Palestine, apologized in 2022 after blaming the "Jewish lobby" for criticism of the UN inquiry.

Donald Trump saying "my father would tell me the most powerful lobby that there is in this country is the Jewish lobby" in December 2025 at "a Hanukkah Reception"

== See also ==
- Diaspora politics in the United States
- Ethnic interest groups in the United States
- Israel lobby in the United Kingdom
- Israel lobby in the United States
- Shtadlan
