= Rafeef Ziadah =

Palestinian poet

- رفيف زيادة
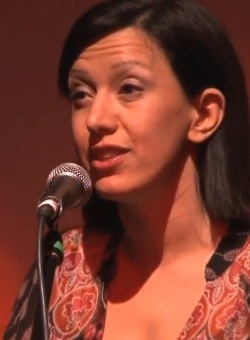
- Ziadah in 2012
- Born: 1979 (age 46–47); Beirut, Lebanon
- Education: York University
- Occupation: Poet

Rafeef Ziadah (Arabic: رفيف زيادة) (born 1979 in Beirut, Lebanon) is a Palestinian-Canadian poet and human rights activist who lives in London, England. She released the spoken word album, Hadeel.

== Early life and education ==
Ziadah was born in Beirut, Lebanon, to Palestinian refugee parents. She began writing at a young age. She grew up in Tunisia and attended York University in Toronto, Ontario, Canada.

== Career and activism ==
In 2004, she gave her first public performance after she was motivated by her experience of racism to write a poem.

In 2009 Ziadah released her first spoken word album, Hadeel. Ziadah produced Hadeel with a grant from the Ontario Arts Council within their Word of Mouth program in 2008. Ziadah has traveled to countries all over the world to perform and conduct poetry workshops. In 2011, Ziadah performed with Palestinian-American poet, Remi Kanazi in London, UK as part of the tour for his book, Poetic Injustice. In 2012, Ziadah was chosen to represent Palestine at the South Bank Center Poets Olympiad. In the same year, she performed at the World Village Festival in Helsinki. During the summer of 2014, Ziadah contributed an opinion piece for The Guardian regarding the 2014 Gaza War and the Boycott, Divestment, and Sanctions movement. On November 14, 2014 Ziadah performed at a benefit concert for Palestine with Palestinian Hip hop group, DAM-Palestine sponsored by Manchester Palestine Action. Rafeef Ziadah is well known for her poems "Shades of Anger" and "We teach life, sir". Ziadah's poem "We teach life, sir" became the inspiration for a photography show for display inside the Scottish Parliament. The exhibit was titled, "We Teach Life: The Children of the Occupation."

== Publications ==
- Bhandar, Brenna; Ziadah, Rafeef, eds. (2020). Revolutionary Feminisms: Conversations on Collective Action and Radical Thought. London: Verso. ISBN 9781788737760.
- Hanieh, Adam; Knox, Robert; Ziadah, Rafeef (2025). Resisting Erasure: Capital, Imperialism and Race in Palestine. Verso. ISBN 9781836740759.
