= Israel lobby =

Israel lobby may refer to:

- Israel lobby in the United States
- Israel lobby in the United Kingdom
- The Israel Lobby and U.S. Foreign Policy, a book by John Mearsheimer and Stephen Walt

== See also ==
- Jewish lobby
- Zionism
