= Boycott from Within =

Israelis political association

BOYCOTT! Supporting the Palestinian BDS Call from Within, commonly known as Boycott from Within, is an association of Jewish and Arab Israelis who support the Boycott, Divestment, and Sanctions (BDS) movement. Founded in 2008, it describes itself as following the guiding principles and sharing the goals of the Palestinian BDS movement, as delineated by Palestinian Campaign for the Academic and Cultural Boycott of Israel (PACBI).

== Views and strategy ==
The members of Boycott from Within describe themselves as "Palestinians, Jews, citizens of Israel," who "join the Palestinian call for a BDS campaign against Israel, inspired by the struggle of South Africans against apartheid," and who are "devoted to the promotion of just peace and true democracy in this region." They disapprove of "Western governments' decision to boycott the Palestinians in the Occupied Palestinian Territories," which they characterize as "particularly outrageous given the same Western governments' prolonged support of Israel's apartheid and other daily violations of international law."

== Notable members ==
=== Ronnie Barkan ===
Ronnie Barkan, a longtime Jewish Israeli activist and math teacher who was raised in Raanana, near Tel Aviv, is a co-founder of Boycott from Within. He has been involved since 2004 in protests against the Israeli barrier in the West Bank and has been arrested and detained a number of times. In a 2012 interview with journalist Ceclia Dalla Negra of The Electronic Intifada, he expressed his belief that Palestinian resistance is a "popular struggle rather than a nonviolent one," but added that "as long as Israel and its backers use means of terror against the Palestinian civil population, then we cannot legally and should not morally condemn those fighting for their liberation from doing so."

Barkan has described himself as "among the group of the over-privileged in this struggle for Palestinian rights, acting against a system that has at its very core the Zionist principle of differentiation." He describes the Israeli treatment of Palestinians as apartheid, identifies himself as "anti-Zionist," and refers to Israel as "the Jewish-supremacist entity...founded on the basis of ethnic cleansing and ethnic segregation."

Barkan has been described as having evaded mandatory service in the Israel Defense Forces (IDF). He himself has said that he refused to complete his mandatory military service. "There's a lot of social pressure [in Israel]," he told Al-Jazeera in 2011. "We're raised to be soldiers from kindergarten. We're taught that it's our duty [to serve in the army] and you're a parasite or traitor if you don't want to serve." He said that Israelis "are raised to be deeply racist," and described his support for BDS as a means of "renouncing my privileges in this land and insisting on equality for all." He does not, however, support the turning away of Israeli academics or musicians from conferences or other gatherings abroad because they are Israelis, saying that such conduct amounts to racism.

The Israel Security Agency investigators interrogated Barkan in the run-up to the 2012 "flytilla."

In 2010, Barkan represented the Palestinian Popular Struggle Coordination Committee at the European Parliament.

=== Kobi Snitz ===
Another Boycott from Within activist, Kobi Snitz, is a mathematician employed by the Weizmann Institute of Science in Rehovot. Snitz is also a longtime member of Anarchists Against the Wall who has demonstrated alongside Palestinian villagers protesting the West Bank fence for many years. In addition, he has close connections to the Palestine Solidarity Project. Imprisoned in 2004 for interfering with security policies, he was summoned by Shin Bet for questioning in 2010, at which time Shin Bet told Haaretz that it possessed "information indicating that Dr. Kobi Snitz is involved in organizing illegal gatherings and illegal entry into restricted military zones in the West Bank."

=== Leehee Rothschild ===
Boycott from Within member Leehee Rothschild’s Tel Aviv apartment was raided and she was detained in 2011. "Obviously [the pressure] is nothing compared to what Palestinians are going through," Rothschild told Al-Jazeera. "But I think we're touching a nerve." She said that if the Boycott Law, then under consideration, were passed, "it will peel off, a little more, Israel's mask of democracy." She described the Israeli people, moreover, as being themselves "oppressed by the occupation – they are living inside a society that is militant; that is violent; that is racist."

=== Ofer Neiman ===
Ofer Neiman is one of the leaders of Boycott from Within. In July 2010, he spoke with Between The Lines’ Melinda Tuhus about the group, saying that “if Israel had accepted the Saudi Initiative – which is not just a Saudi initiative, it's an initiative by the Arab League, a comprehensive peace initiative based on the two-state solution and the '67 borders, then there would be no BDS campaign.”

== Interventions with celebrities and corporations ==
In 2010, Boycott from Within successfully called for the rock band The Pixies to boycott Israel. "Are you ready to perform in Tel Aviv," the organization asked in an open letter to the band, "when right in front of you millions of people are suffocating under a cruel Israeli military regime that denies them basic human rights?"

Boycott from Within took credit for successfully convincing French pop star Vanessa Paradis to cancel a planned 2011 performance in Israel. In a letter to Paradis, the group urged her "to take this opportunity to take a stand on an issue crucial to human rights and as such, to human lives as well." Describing the Israeli Army as "control[ling] everyday Palestinian life, at the barrel of a gun," and as having spent "over 60 years...murdering, maiming, arresting civilians, all the while stealing their lands by extreme and brutal force," the letter said that if Paradis performed in Israel "it will have the effect of contributing to Israel's image of normality" and of "allow[ing] the state of Israel to use your reputation to whitewash its crimes!"

Boycott from Within has also targeted British Telecom for its business relationship with Israeli company Bezeq.

Boycott from Within unsuccessfully petitioned organizers of London's 2012 Globe to Globe Shakespeare festival to cancel a performance by Israel's national theater company, Habima. The company was invited to stage The Merchant of Venice as part of a series of performances of 37 Shakespeare plays, each performed in a different language by a different theater group.

== See also ==
- BDS movement
