= Gaza war protests at universities =

Protests at universities during the Gaza war
- Part of the Gaza war protests
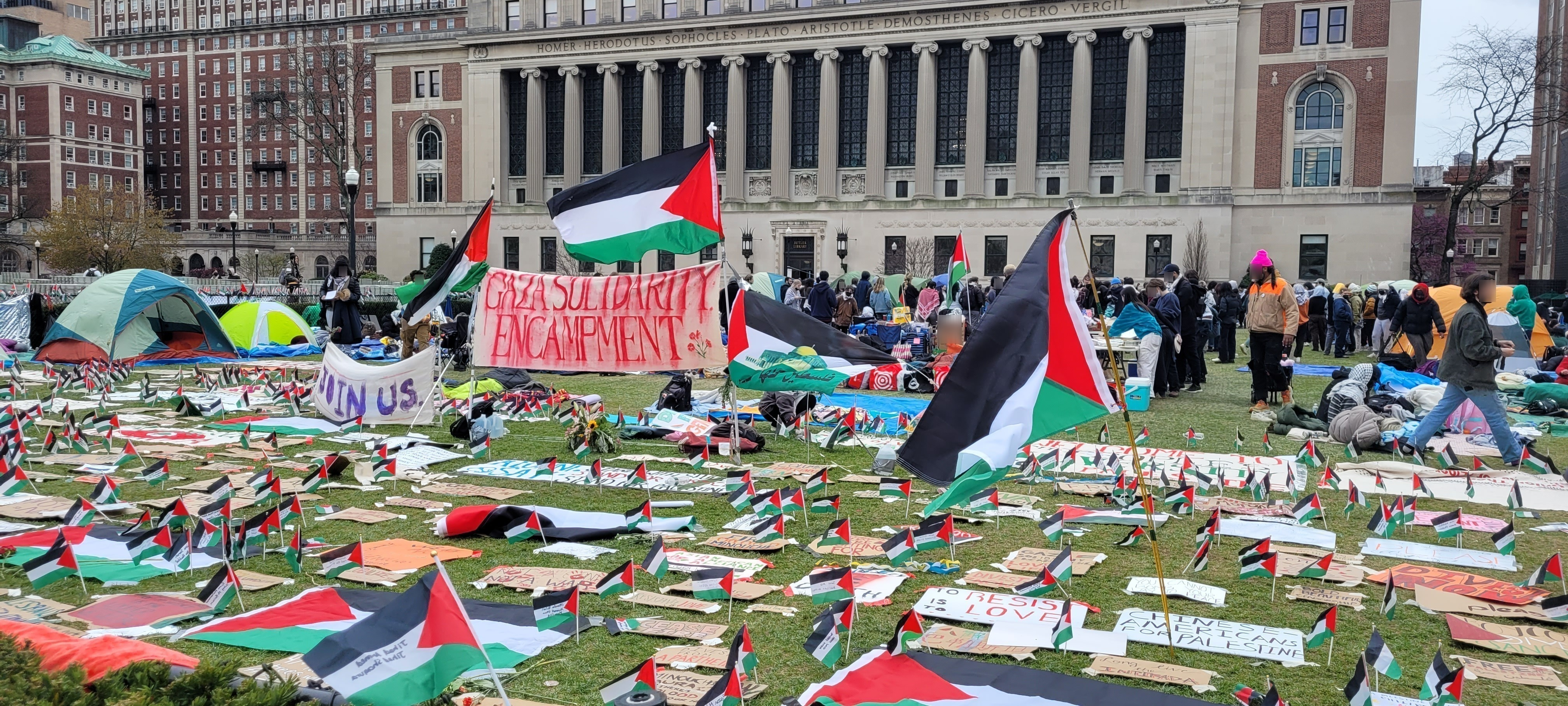
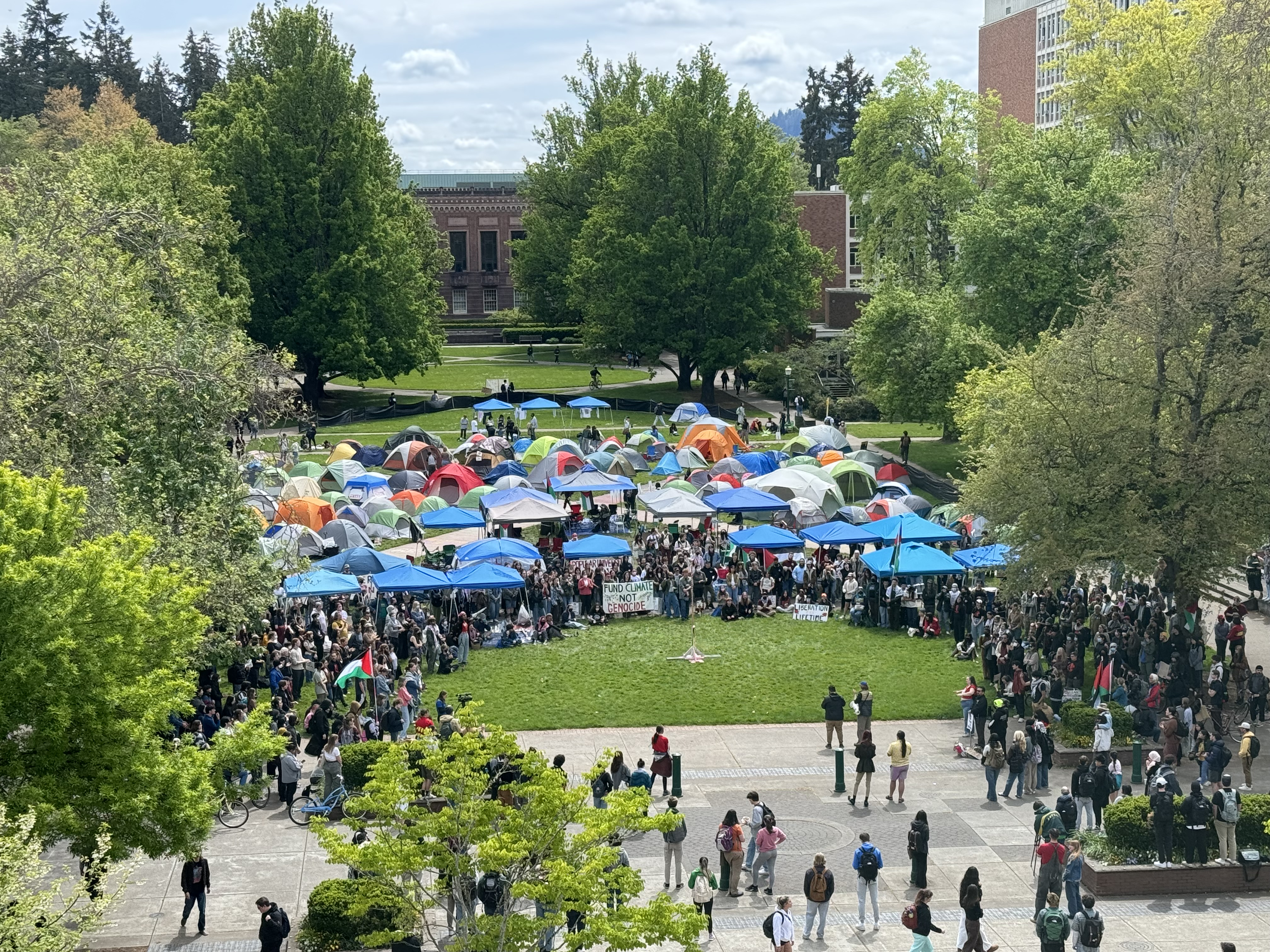
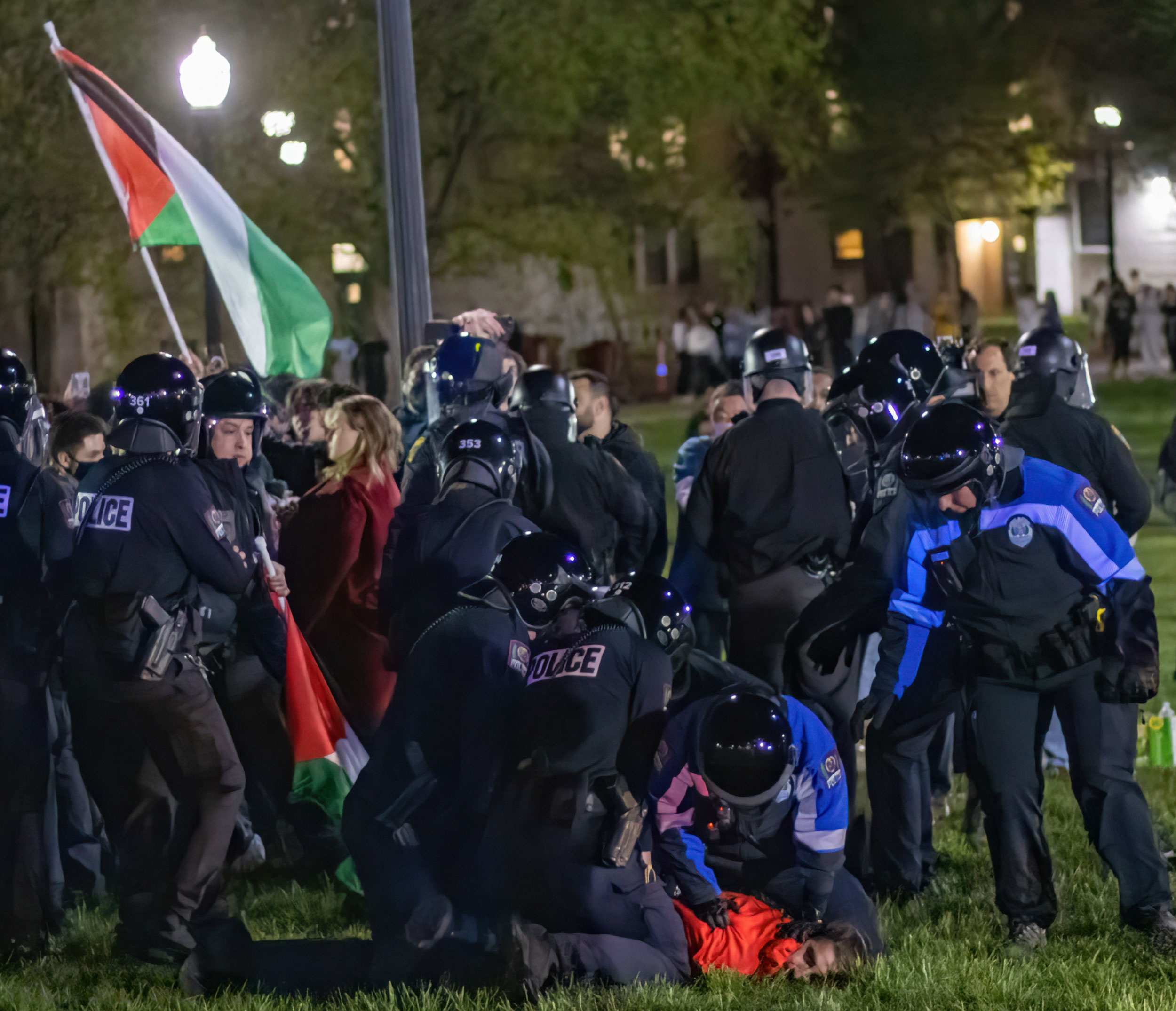
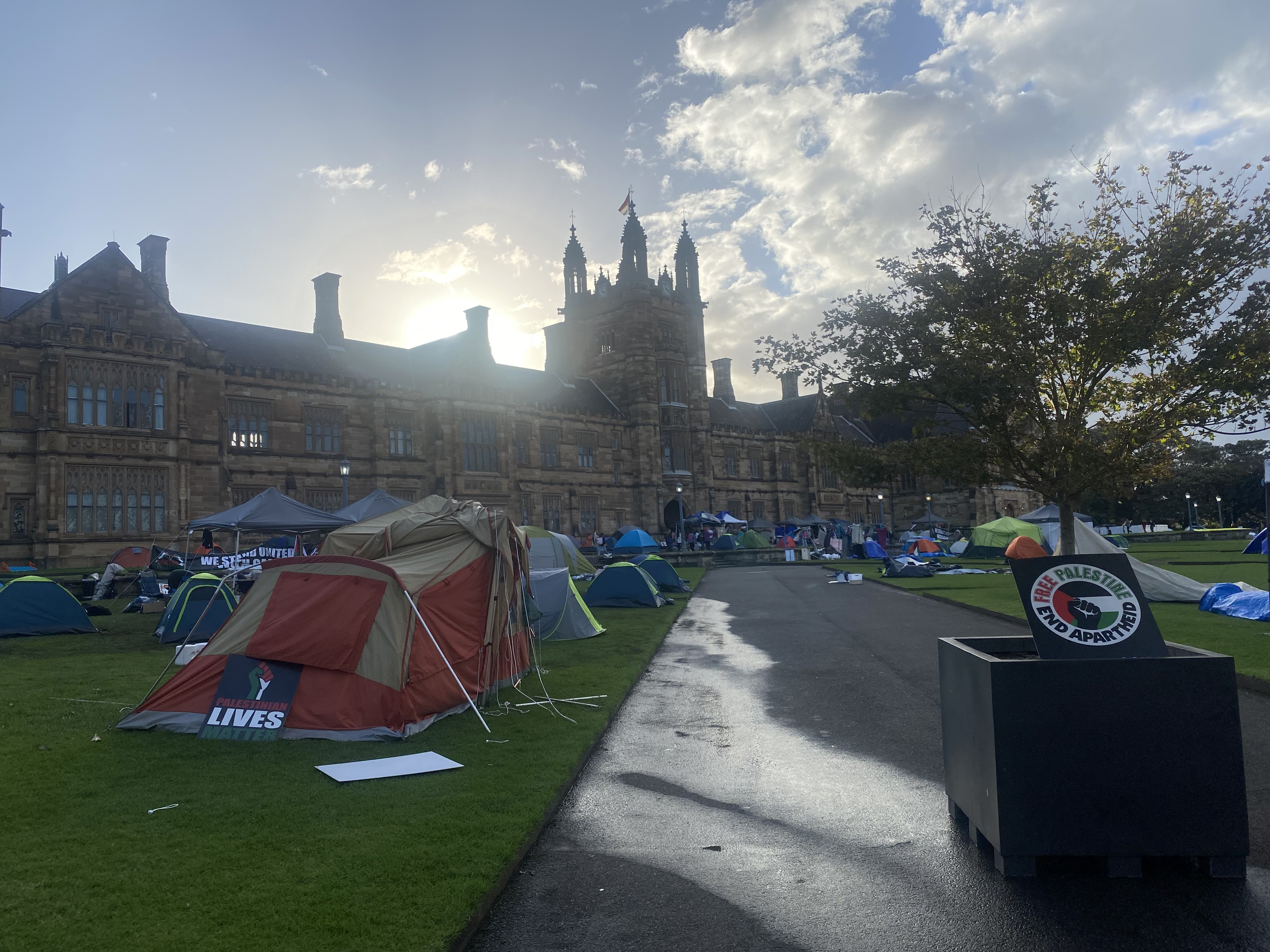
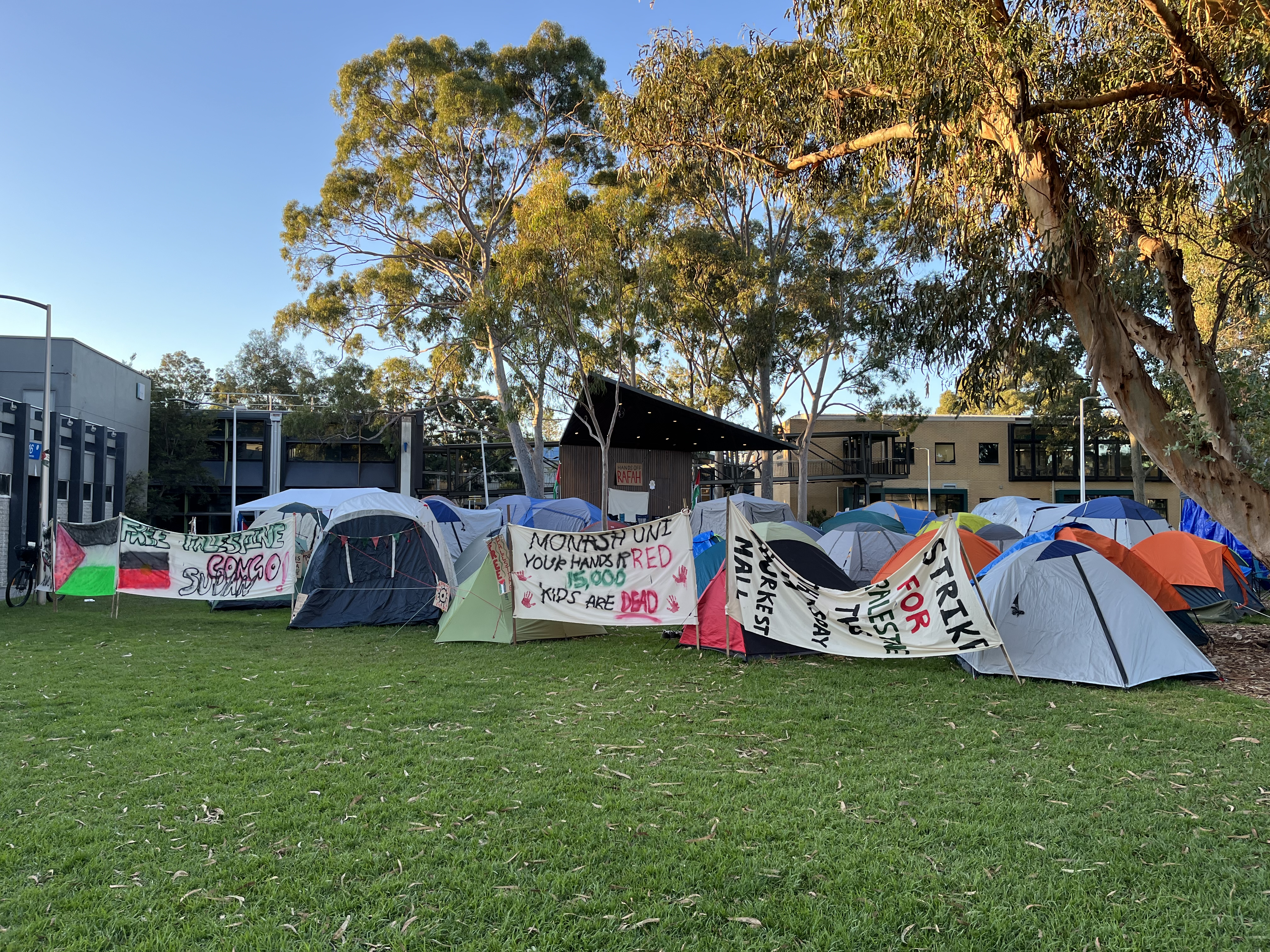
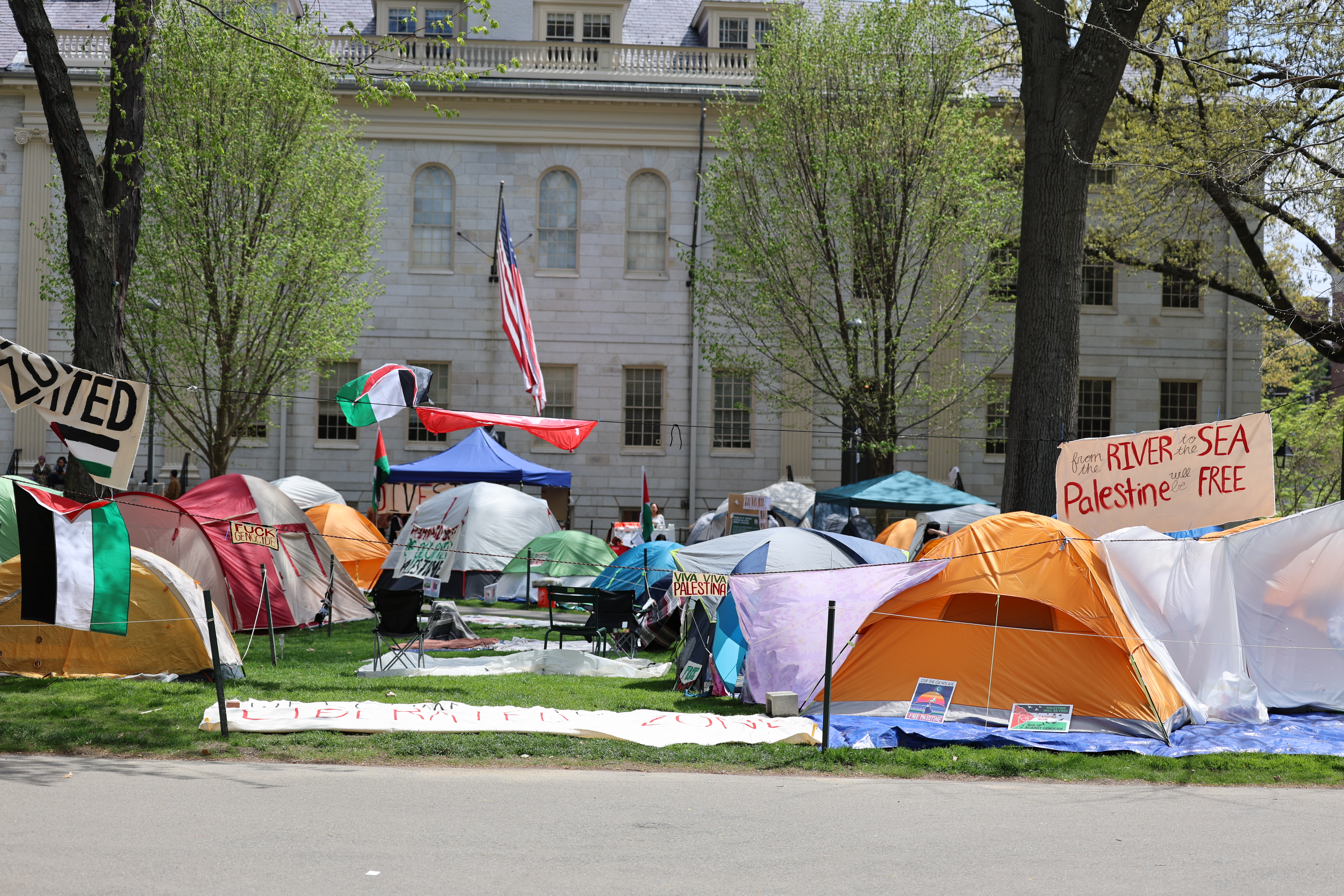
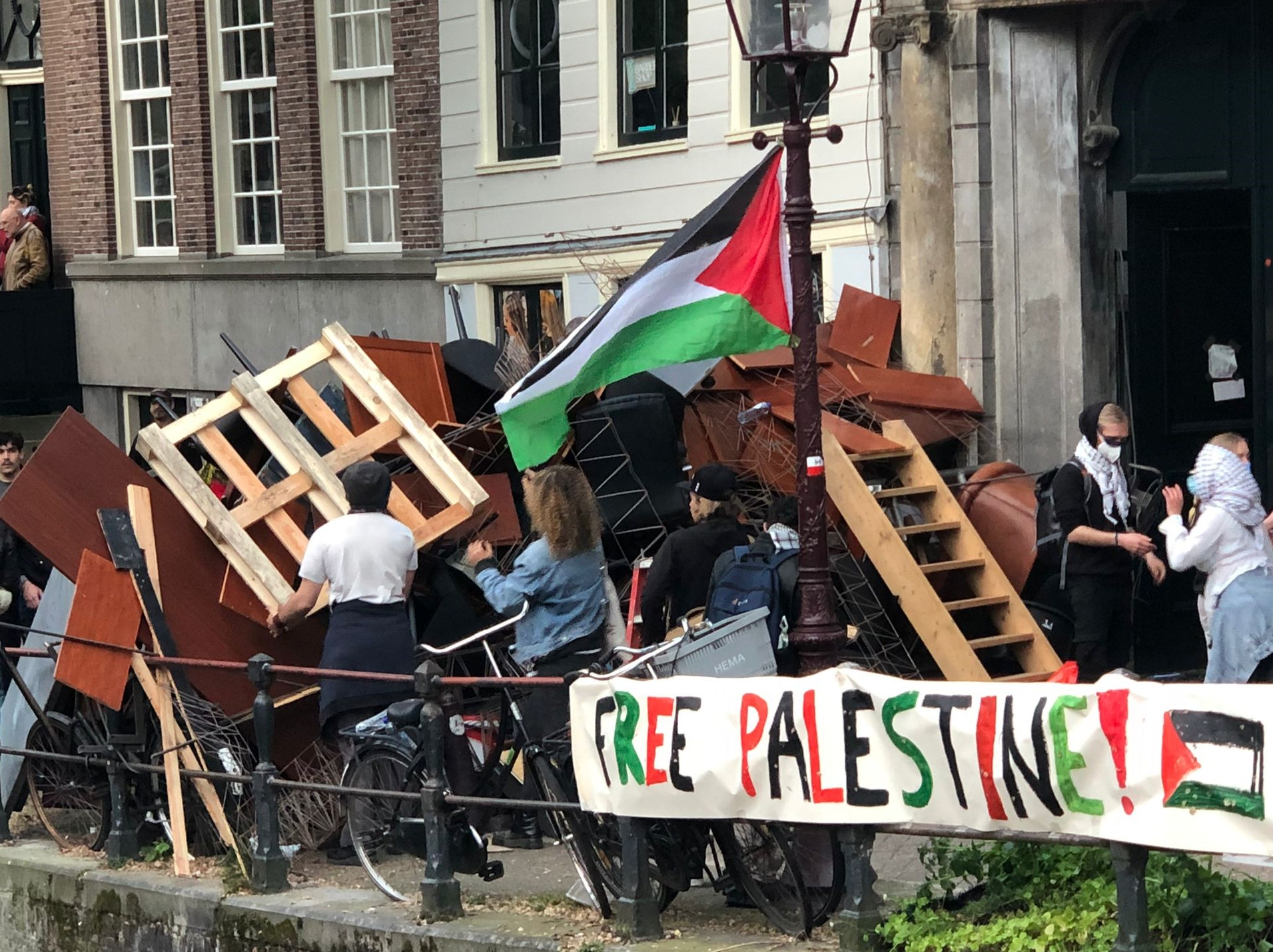
- Clockwise from top: Columbia University; Ohio State University; Monash University; University of Amsterdam; Harvard University; University of Sydney; University of Oregon
- Date: April 17, 2024 – July 2024 (3 months and 2 days)
- Location: Global (primarily Australia, Canada, the Netherlands, UK, and US) List of countries: Argentina; Austria; Australia; Bangladesh; Belgium; Brazil; Canada; Costa Rica; Cuba; Denmark; Egypt; Finland; France; Germany; India; Indonesia; Iraq; Ireland; Italy; Japan; Kuwait; Lebanon; Mexico; Netherlands; New Zealand; Portugal; Romania; South Africa; South Korea; Spain; Sweden; Tunisia; United Kingdom; United States; Yemen
- Caused by: Opposition to: Gaza genocide; U.S. support for Israel; Investments in Israel
- Goals: Universities divesting from Israel
- Methods: Protests; Civil disobedience; Lawsuits; Picketing; Rolling strikes; Occupation; Civil disorder

Lead figures
Primary organizers: Students for Justice in Palestine; Palestinian Youth Movement; Jewish Voice for Peace; IfNotNow; Young Democratic Socialists of America; Independent formations	Primary detractors: University administrations; Hillel International; Chabad on Campus; Israel on Campus Coalition

Casualties
- Injuries: 15-25+ protesters hospitalized
- Arrested: 3,100+ protesters

During the Gaza war and genocide, protests on university campuses in solidarity with the Palestinians in Gaza escalated in April 2024, spreading in the United States and other countries, as part of wider Gaza war protests. The escalation, nicknamed the "student intifada" by activists, began on April 18 after mass arrests at the Gaza Solidarity Encampment at Columbia University, in which protesters demanded the university's disinvestment from Israel. Over 3,100 protesters were arrested in the U.S., including faculty members and professors, on over 60 campuses. Protests spread across Europe in May with mass arrests in the Netherlands, 20 encampments established in the United Kingdom, and across universities in Australia and Canada.

The different protests' varying demands included severing financial ties with Israel, transparency about financial ties, ending partnerships with Israeli institutions, and amnesty for protesters. Universities suspended and expelled student protesters, in some cases evicting them from campus housing. Many universities relied on police to forcibly disband encampments and end occupations of buildings, several made agreements with protesters for encampments to be dismantled, (Note: Universities that came to agreements with protesters over certain demands, in order for encampments to be dismantled, included Northwestern University, Brown University, Evergreen State College, University of Minnesota, Rutgers University, Goldsmiths, University of London, University of California, Riverside, Thompson Rivers University, University of California, Berkeley, Harvard University, and the University of Sydney.) and others cut ties with Israeli institutions or companies involved with Israel and its occupied territories. (Note: Universities that cut or paused ties with Israeli institutions – or companies involved with Israel and its occupied territories – include Portland State University, Trinity College Dublin, the University of Helsinki, the University of Copenhagen, Ghent University, the University of Waterloo, San Francisco State University , Massachusetts Institute of Technology, and the Institut d'études politiques de Strasbourg.) The campus occupations also resulted in the closure of Columbia University, Cal Poly Humboldt, and the University of Amsterdam; rolling strikes by academic workers on campuses in California, and the cancellation of some U.S. university graduation ceremonies.

Hundreds of groups expressed support for the protests, and the police response in the U.S. was criticised. Supporters of Israel and some Jewish students raised concerns about antisemitic incidents at or around the protests, prompting condemnations of the protests by international leaders. Students and faculty members who participated in the protests, many of whom are Jewish, said the protests were not antisemitic. A May 2024 poll estimated that 8% of U.S. college students had participated in the protests, with 45% supporting them and 24% opposed. 97% of the protests remained nonviolent and 28–40% of Americans supported the protests with 42–47% opposed. (Note: Range is based on the following two polls: YouGov, 47% of Americans opposed the campus protests and 28% supported them; Data for Progress poll in collaboration with Zeteo, 40% approved, while 42% disapproved of the protests.) The protests were compared to the anti-Vietnam and 1968 protests, politically criticized by a wide range of mainstream U.S. Republican and Democratic politicians, and frequently counter-protested by Zionist and right-wing organizations.

== Background ==
Protests, including rallies, demonstrations, campaigns, and vigils related to the Gaza war occurred across the U.S. since the conflict's start on October 7, 2023, alongside other Gaza war protests around the world. Pro-Palestinian protesters criticized Israel's invasion, war conduct in the Gaza Strip, and U.S. military and diplomatic support for Israel.

Students occupying administrative buildings were arrested at the request of college administrators at Brown University in November and December 2023, and at Pomona College on April 5, 2024. In March 2024, after protesters occupied the president's office at Vanderbilt University, the university suspended students and expelled three. These were "believed to be the first student expulsions over protests related to the Israel-Hamas conflict", according to The New York Times.

=== Characterizations as antisemitism ===
Title VI of the Civil Rights Act of 1964, which was established to protect against racial discrimination in Jim Crow laws affecting education, was reinterpreted by Attorney Kenneth L. Marcus while he was working at the Office for Civil Rights of the United States Department of Education to include protections against discrimination on the basis of religion, particularly "when an affected student's 'shared ancestry' would have been treated as a 'race' in earlier jurisprudence". Jason Brownlee writes that Marcus "subsequently became one of the preeminent advocates for applying Title VI against speech and events criticizing Israeli repression of Palestinians, deeds Marcus considered antisemitic", and advocated adopting the IHRA definition of antisemitism.

A May 2024 "Dear Colleague" letter formalized a broadened interpretation of Title VI that created a "hostile environment" for groups protected by Title VI, thereby challenging free speech rights protected by the First Amendment with regard to phrases such as "from the river to the sea", speech that describes Zionism as settler colonialism, or mentioning the Gaza genocide.

On October 25, 2023, Jonathan Greenblatt of the Anti-Defamation League (ADL) and Alyza D. Lewin and Kenneth L. Marcus of the Louis D. Brandeis Center for Human Rights Under Law had written university presidents a letter calling on them to investigate Students for Justice in Palestine for "potential violations of the prohibition against materially supporting a foreign terrorist organization", adding, "universities must also update their code of conduct to ensure that harassment and support for terrorism have no place on campus." Jewish Currents and The Intelligencer noted the letter cited no evidence in support of these allegations. Administrators at several private universities then suspended their SJP chapters, starting with Brandeis University on November 6, 2023. On November 14, Columbia University followed suit, suspending its chapter of Jewish Voice for Peace. The state of Florida ordered that all SJP chapters in the state be disbanded.

== Protests on campuses ==
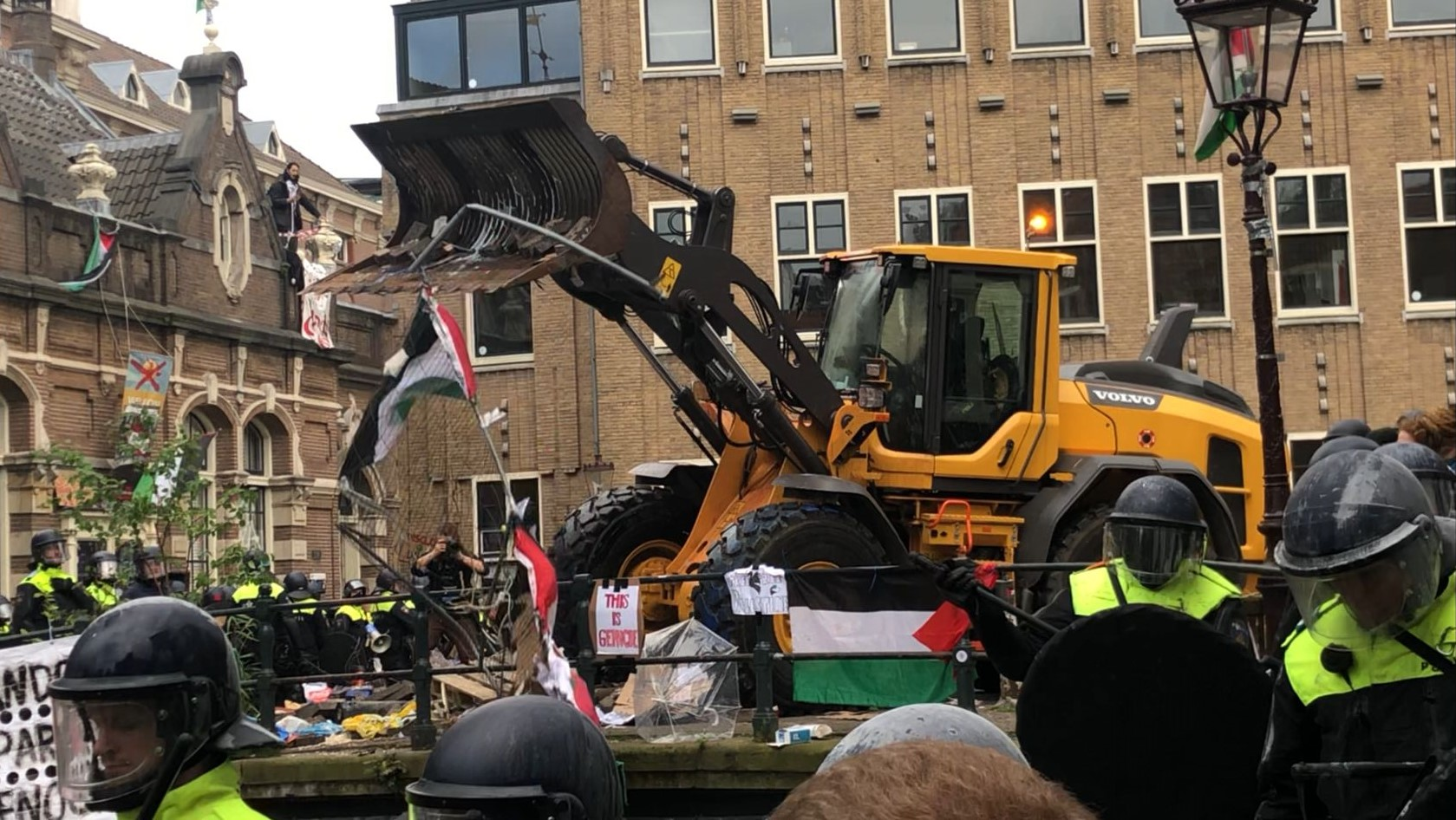
Wheel loader demolishing a barricade at the University of Amsterdam campus occupation, May 8

By May 6, 2024, student protests had occurred in 45 of the 50 states in the United States and the District of Columbia, with encampments, occupations, walkouts or sit-ins on almost 140 campuses. Thirty-four encampments were established in the United Kingdom; across universities in Australia, beginning with the University of Sydney; and in Canada, including an encampment at McGill University. On May 7, protests spread further on European campuses after mass arrests at the University of Amsterdam campus occupation, including occupation of campus buildings at Leipzig University in Germany, Sciences Po in France, and Ghent University in Belgium. By May 8, protests had taken place in more than 25 countries, and on May 13, approximately 1,000 Dutch students and university staff took part in a national walk-out.

=== First encampment at Columbia University ===
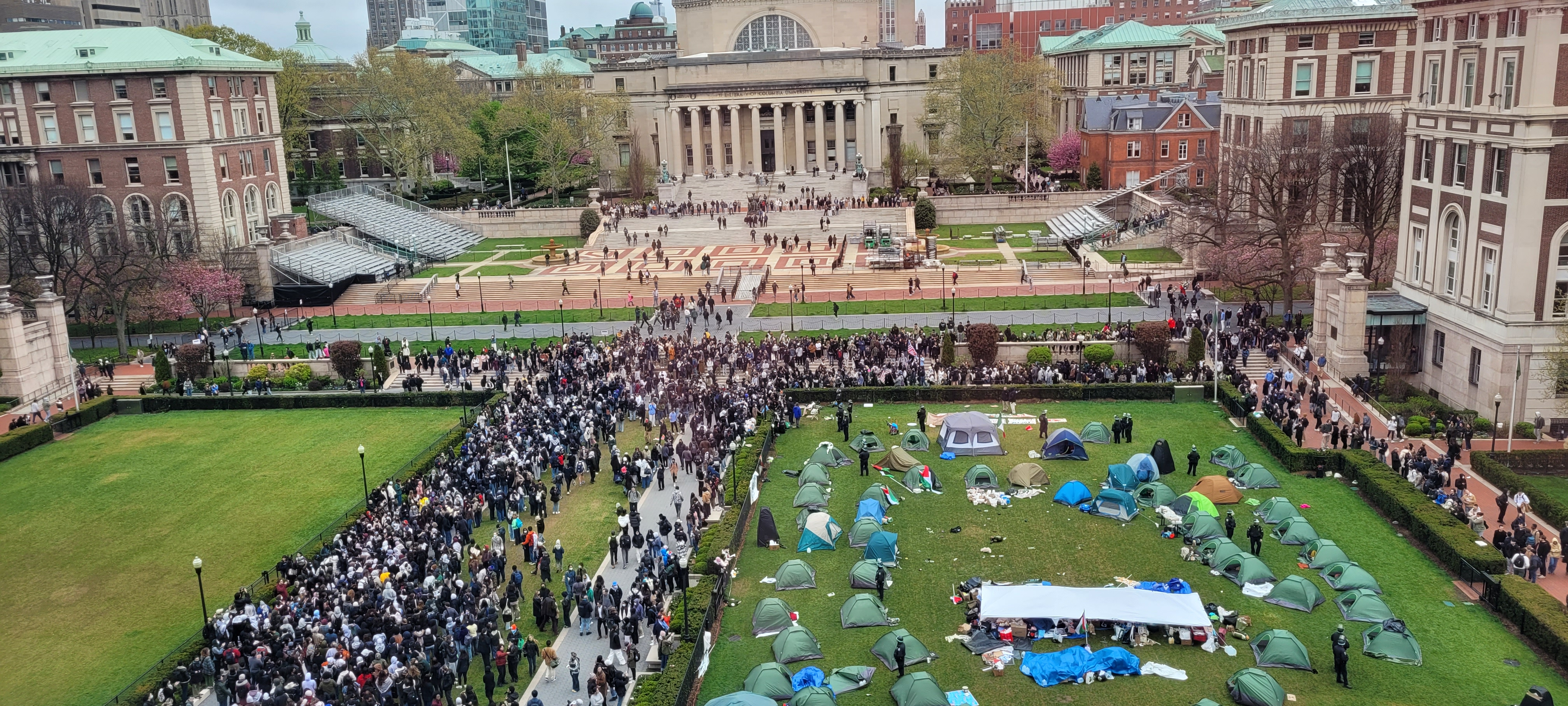
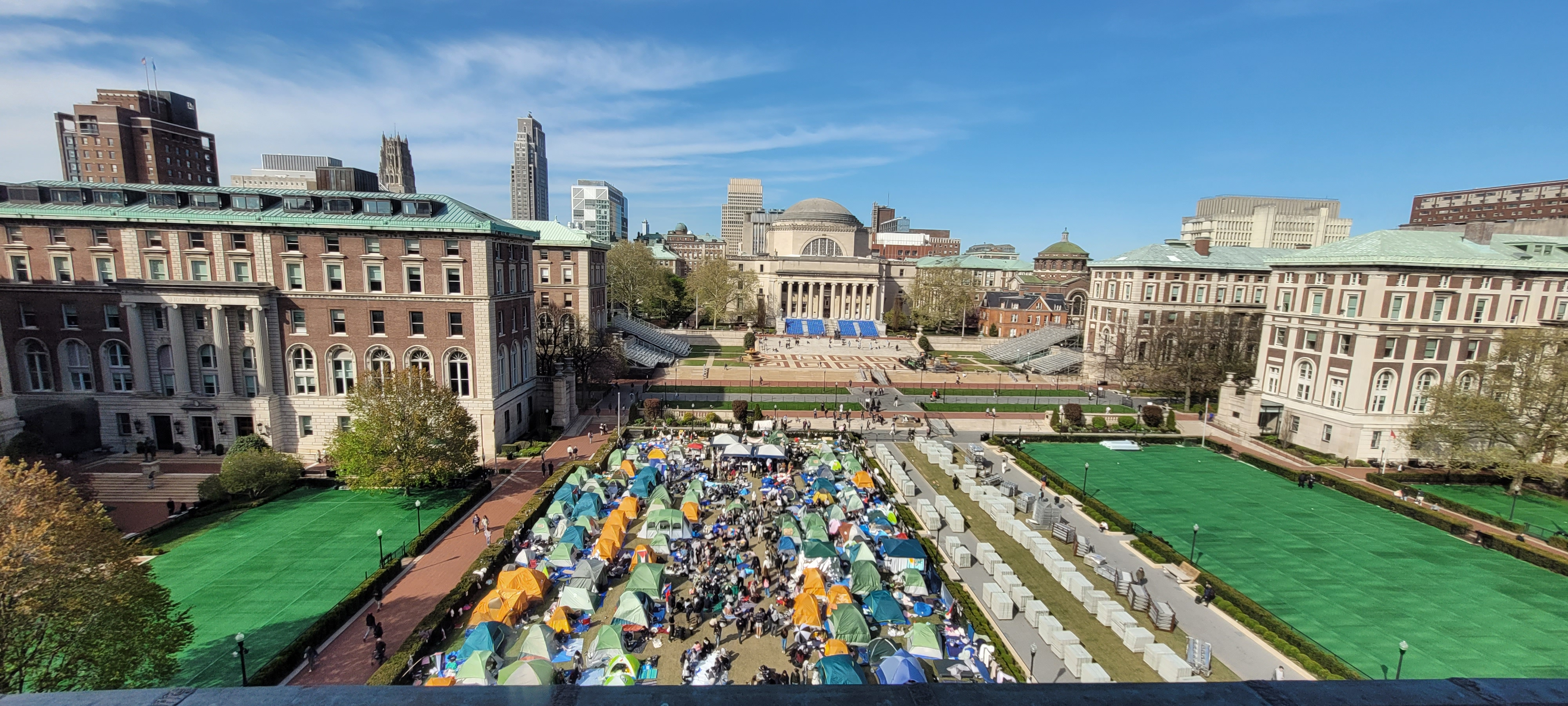
- First encampment after arrests, April 18
- Growth of second encampment, April 23

A series of occupation protests by pro-Palestinian students occurred at Columbia University in New York City from April to June 2024, in the context of the broader Gaza war protests in the United States. The protests began on April 17, 2024, when pro-Palestinian students established an encampment of approximately 50 tents on campus, calling it the Gaza Solidarity Encampment, and demanded that the university divest from Israel.

The first encampment was dismantled when university president Minouche Shafik authorized the New York City Police Department (NYPD) to enter the campus on April 18 and conduct mass arrests. A new encampment was built the next day. The administration then entered into negotiations with protesters, which failed on April 29 and resulted in the suspension of student protesters. The next day, protesters broke into and occupied Hamilton Hall, leading to a second NYPD raid, the arrest of more than 100 protesters, and the full dismantling of the camp. The arrests marked the first time Columbia had allowed police to suppress campus protests since the 1968 demonstrations against the Vietnam War. On May 31, a third campus encampment was briefly established in response to an alumni reunion.

=== Spread in the United States ===
Universities in the United States with Gaza War protests since April 2024. Columbia University is marked in red. Other colleges that had encampments are marked in green, and non-encampment protests are marked in blue.

Over 3,100 protesters were arrested in the U.S., including faculty members and professors, on over 60 campuses. Demonstrations initially spread in the U.S. on April 22, 2024, when students at several universities on the East Coast—including New York University, Yale University, Emerson College, the Massachusetts Institute of Technology (MIT), and Tufts University—began occupying campuses, as well as experiencing mass arrests in New York and at Yale. Protests emerged throughout the U.S. in the following days, with protest camps established on over 40 campuses. On April 25, mass arrests occurred at Emerson College, the University of Southern California, and the University of Texas at Austin.

A continued crackdown on April 27 led to approximately 275 arrests at Washington, Northeastern, Arizona State, and Indiana University Bloomington. Several professors were among those detained at Emory University, and at Washington University in St. Louis, university employees were arrested. On April 28, counter-protests were held at MIT, the University of Pennsylvania, and the University of California, Los Angeles (UCLA). On April 30, approximately 300 protesters were arrested at Columbia University and City College of New York and pro-Israel counter-protesters attacked the UCLA campus occupation. The next day, over 200 arrests were made at UCLA.

Hundreds of arrests ensued in May, notably (Note: As defined by CNN map of "Campus protests where arrests have been made since April 18", highlighting schools with 45 or more total arrests.) at the Art Institute of Chicago, University of California, San Diego, the Fashion Institute of Technology in New York, and University of California, Irvine. On May 20, the first strike by academic workers took place on campuses in California at UC Santa Cruz, followed by UC Davis and UCLA on May 28. The protests ended as universities closed for the summer.

=== Protesters' demands ===
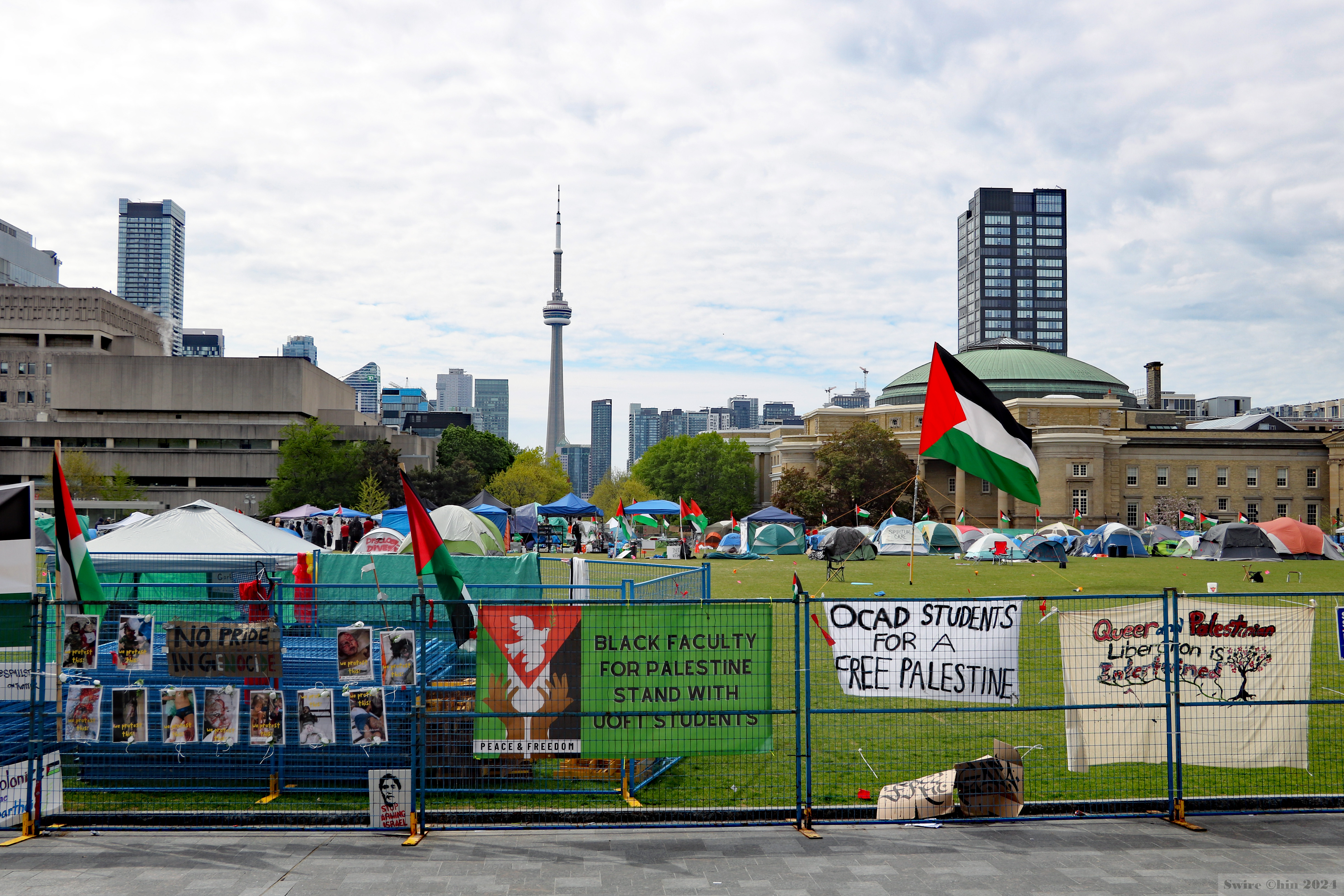
University of Toronto pro-Palestinian encampment on May 10, 2024

Many of the protests involved students demanding that their schools sever financial ties to Israel and companies involved in the conflict, as well as an end to U.S. military support for Israel, as part of the Boycott, Divestment and Sanctions (BDS) movement. Some protests also demanded that universities sever academic ties with Israel, support a ceasefire in Gaza, and disclose investments. Student demands varied among the different occupations, including that universities stop accepting research money from Israel that supports the military, and that college endowments stop investing with managers who profit from Israeli entities.

Student protesters called on Columbia University to financially divest from any company with business ties to the Israeli government, including Microsoft, Google, and Amazon. NYU Alumni for Palestine called on New York University to "terminate all vendor contracts with companies playing active roles in the military occupation in Palestine and ongoing genocide in Gaza, namely Cisco, Lockheed Martin, Caterpillar and General Electric". Pro-Palestinian protesters demanded that the University of Washington cut ties with Boeing. Students at the University of Vermont demanded the cancellation of a planned commencement speech by Linda Thomas-Greenfield.

After several mass arrests, the demands also included amnesty for students and faculty who were disciplined or fired for protesting. The protests on many campuses were created by coalitions of student groups, and largely independent, although Reuters Press reported that they were inspired by demonstrations at Columbia University. All disavowed violence. Protesters at Vanderbilt University smashed a window and injured a security guard.

== Impact ==
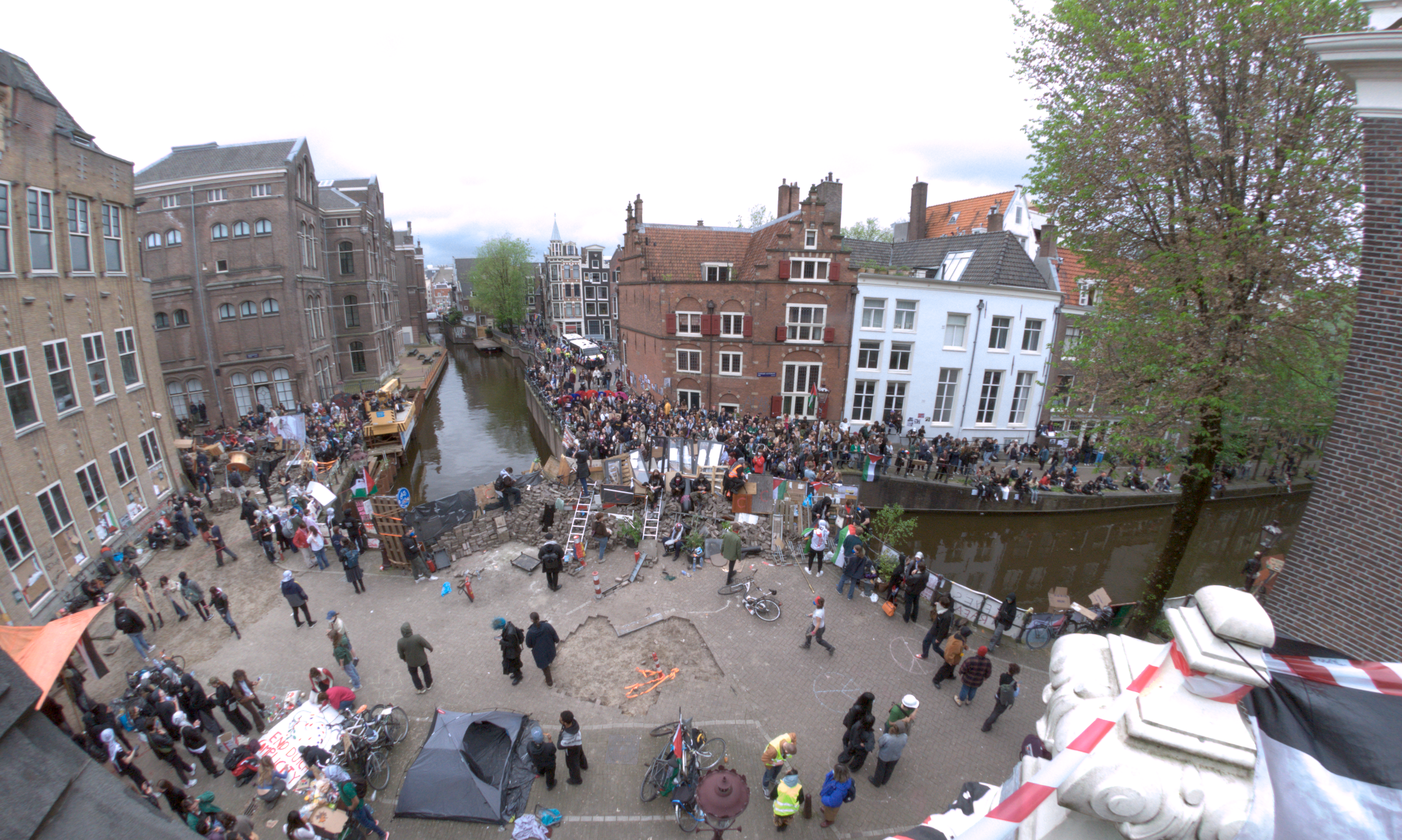
Overview of barricades at the University of Amsterdam. After a series of occupation protests, the university closed for two days on May 13.

=== Closures, cancellations, and graduation protests ===
In April 2024, the occupations resulted in the closure of Columbia University and Cal Poly Humboldt for the remainder of the semester, and faculty members in California, Georgia, and Texas also initiated votes of no confidence. Columbia, Cal Poly Humboldt, and the University of Southern California canceled their graduation ceremonies due in May. On May 13, the University of Amsterdam closed for two days after renewed occupations on campus.

In May, protests at graduation ceremonies occurred at the University of Michigan, Northeastern University, the University of Illinois Chicago, Indiana University, Virginia Commonwealth University, the University of Wisconsin-Madison, the University of North Carolina, and the University of California, Berkeley. After demands from protesters, the University of Vermont canceled its graduation ceremony speaker, U.S. ambassador to the United Nations Linda Thomas-Greenfield. On June 1, students staged a walkout at the University of Chicago's graduation ceremony, and walkouts at graduations occurred at Harvard University, the Massachusetts Institute of Technology, and elsewhere. In April, a pro-Palestinian student group won elections in the University of Michigan's student government. In August, the student government voted to freeze its funding for student clubs until the university met student activists' divestment demands.

=== Divestment by universities ===
On April 28, Portland State University (PSU) announced it was pausing its financial ties with Boeing, including gifts and grants, over its ties to Israel. PSU President Ann Cudd wrote in a campus-wide letter, "the passion with which these demands are being repeatedly expressed by some in our community motivates". On May 6, Trinity College Dublin in Ireland agreed to end its investments in Israeli companies that are listed on the United Nations Human Rights Council "blacklist" after an encampment on Fellows' Square was erected. This included three of the 13 Israeli companies the university's endowment fund had invested in.

The University of Helsinki in Finland suspended student exchanges with Israeli universities on May 21 after two weeks of campus protests. On May 28, the University of Copenhagen in Denmark announced it would cease investing in companies that operate in the occupied West Bank, divesting US$145,810 worth of holdings from Airbnb, Booking.com, and EDreams the next day. Three days later, Ghent University in Belgium cut ties with Israeli universities and research institutions, referencing "concerns regarding connections between Israeli academic institutions and the Israeli government, military, or security services". The university had severed ties with three Israeli institutions two weeks earlier, citing incompatibility with Israel's human rights policy. On June 11, the University of Waterloo in Ontario, Canada, agreed to protesters' demands to factor human rights into its investment decisions.

In late August 2024, San Francisco State University began the divestment process from four weapons manufacturers involved with the war. The next month, the MIT Coalition for Palestine announced that MIT would discontinue its MIT-Lockheed Martin Seed Fund, a program that financed collaboration between MIT and Israeli universities. The Coalition said this was "the first known American-Israeli weapons manufacturer partnership to end at an American university since the war on Gaza began". Three months later, the Institut d'études politiques de Strasbourg said it would break ties with Reichman University in Israel due to its "warmongering" stance on Gaza.

=== Negotiations with protesters ===
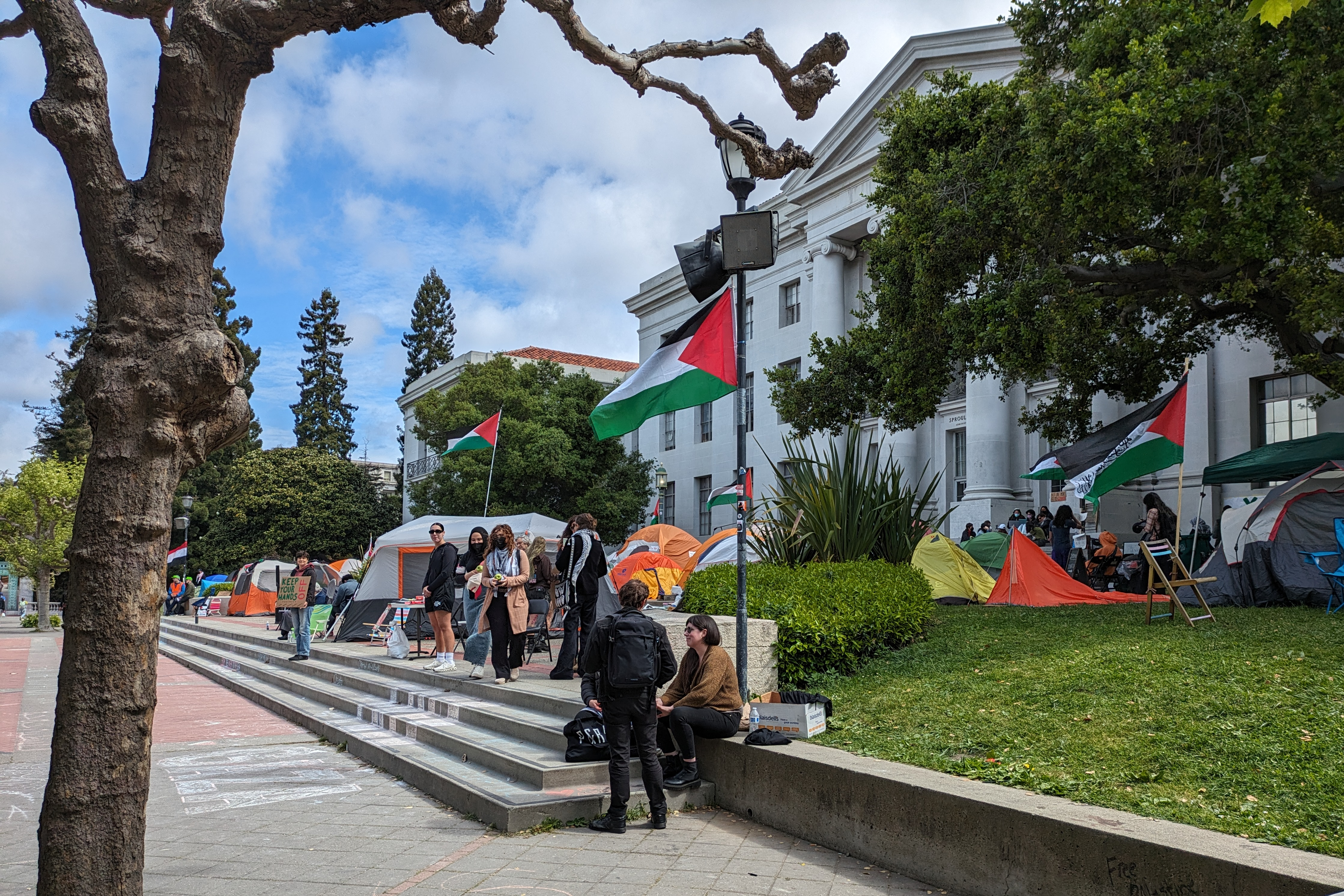
At the University of California, Berkeley, the encampment was dismantled after reaching an agreement with the university.

Other universities said they would consider divestment demands regarding Israel-affiliated companies. Some agreed to disclose their investments and committed to increase awareness about Palestine. Universities that came to agreements with protesters over certain demands, in order for encampments to be dismantled, included Northwestern University on April 29; Brown University and Evergreen State College on April 30; the University of Minnesota on May 1; Rutgers University on May 2; Goldsmiths, University of London and University of California, Riverside on May 3; Thompson Rivers University on May 4, and the University of California, Berkeley on May 14. Wesleyan University allowed encampments on campus to continue, and at the University of Barcelona, the Senate voted to break ties with Israel.

On May 15, the protest encampment at Harvard University ended after the administration agreed to discuss the protesters' demands and to rescind the suspension of 20 students. At California State University, Sonoma State campus president Mike Lee was placed on leave after he agreed to pursue divestment from Israel "without the appropriate approvals". On May 23, the University of Sydney became the first Australian university to accept certain demands. The university agreed to further disclose research grants, subject to confidentiality requirements, in order to increase transparency.

Students at The New School attempted a unique strategy that combined escalations at their encampment and negotiations with administrators. Rather than accepting that negotiations could continue only if escalation ceased, organizers escalated their protests and then offered to cease that escalation in exchange for other concessions during negotiations, improving their bargaining position. Though police ultimately swept their encampment, the sweep led to backlash and condemnation by faculty and deans and required a day-long shutdown of the campus. Students at The New School secured the formation of an advisory investment committee and a subsequent trustee vote on investment in the fall.

=== Campus strikes in California ===
On May 15, members of United Auto Workers Local 4811, the union representing 48,000 graduate students on 10 campuses in the University of California system, voted to authorize a strike because the university unfairly changed policies and discriminated against students who were exercising their right to free speech and created an unsafe work environment by allowing attacks on protesters. The authorization did not guarantee a strike, but allowed the executive board to call one at any time.

Strike action began at UC Santa Cruz on May 20. Union members and leaders said they were not teaching or grading, were withholding data, and would continue to do so until they reached a deal with university officials. The strike was in part a protest against arrests of pro-Palestinian protesters at UCLA, UC Irvine, and UC San Diego. The UC system responded by seeking an injunction against the union, declaring the walkout illegal. On May 23, the California Public Employment Relations Board denied the injunction. The walkout extended to UCLA and UC Davis on May 28, with the intention of expanding to UC Santa Barbara, UC San Diego, and UC Irvine starting the week of June 3.

== Parties involved ==
=== Protest groups ===
==== Organizers and ideologies ====
Participants included students, faculty, and unaffiliated people of various backgrounds, including Jews and Muslims. Pro-Palestinian activists at Columbia said their movement is anti-Zionist, and several campus protests were organized by anti-Zionist groups. Some of the protests were organized by groups such as Students for Justice in Palestine (SJP), Jewish Voice for Peace, IfNotNow, and the Young Democratic Socialists of America. According to The Jerusalem Post, in a press conference protesters at Harvard called the campus occupation movement a "student intifada", (Note: The Arabic term intifada means roughly "uprising" and is often used in the context of Palestinian uprisings in the Israeli-Palestinian conflict.) a term echoed by protesters at George Washington University, Stanford University, Indiana University Bloomington, and Palestinians in Gaza, while calling for an escalation in protests. Protesters also identified a wide range of other ideologies that motivated them, such as anti-racism, intersectionality, anti-colonialism, anti-imperialism, police and prison abolitionism, eco-socialism, indigenous rights, and freedom of expression. Protesters also criticized President Joe Biden and his administration's support for Israel.

As part of the occupations, protesters hosted teach-ins, interfaith prayer, and musical performances. Some protests invited people to tour or speak, such as Palestinian photojournalist Motaz Azaiza, who was invited to and visited Columbia's protest. The Palestinian activist Linda Sarsour said, "These young people are reaffirming and demonstrating that the tide is shifting on Palestine, that the Palestinian people have solidarity not just across the United States of America, but across the world".

At Columbia, protesters who breached Hamilton Hall wrote revolutionary slogans (e.g., "Political power comes from the barrel of a gun") on blackboards. One group involved in the protest movement, Columbia University Apartheid Divest, grew more supportive of armed resistance led by Hamas and the October 7 attacks over the course of 2024. Within Our Lifetime leader Nerdeen Kiswani, who arrived at the Columbia encampment in April, called for Palestine liberation "'by any means necessary', including armed resistance". Her group formed from CUNY SJP, which targeted the Brooklyn Museum in May 2024.

==== "Outside agitators" ====
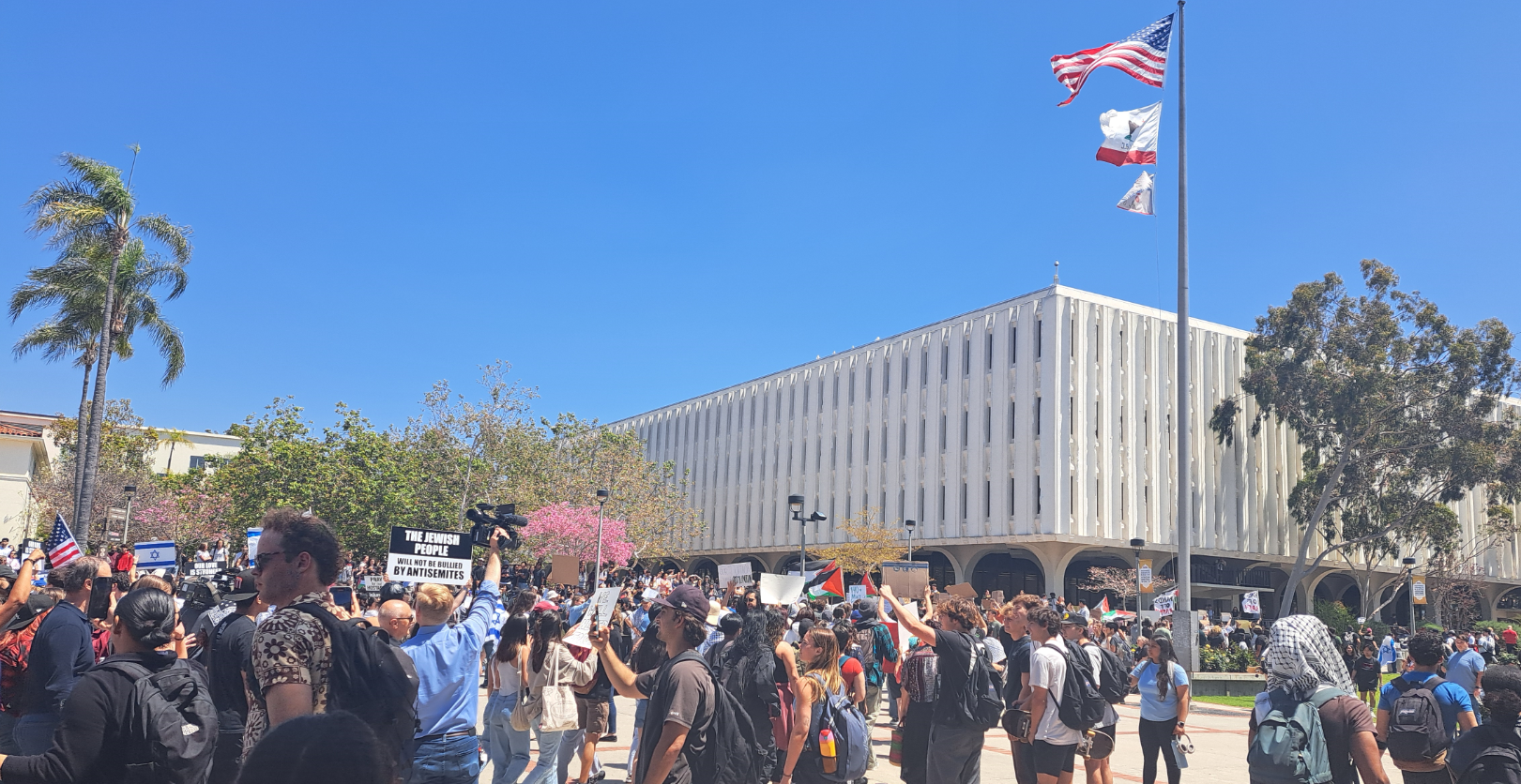
Pro-Palestinian protesters march past pro-Israel counter-protesters at San Diego State University, April 30.

Many anti-Zionist protesters donned masks and keffiyehs, which increased concerns from provosts and deans that outsiders had infiltrated protests. Protesters expressed fears of receiving reputational and professional harm from identification.

Concern was raised about the presence of outside groups at protests. During arrests in New York on May 2, police announced that nearly half of those arrested at Columbia and CCNY were unaffiliated with either school. Mayor Eric Adams said that they had seen evidence that outside agitators and "professionals" such as Lisa Fithian and the wife of Sami Al-Arian had given students tactical knowledge and training to escalate their protests. A University of Texas at Austin official said half of the rule breakers detained at a protest on April 24, 2024, were unaffiliated with the school. In 2025, Swarthmore College said there was a "growing presence of individuals unaffiliated with the College" and campus property had been vandalized.

In October 2025, Syracuse University chancellor Kent Syverud said the protests on campus seemed to have been encouraged by Iran. He emphasized that, although there was an initially welcoming atmosphere for both pro-Israel and pro-Palestinian activities, a noticeable shift occurred later. Syverud expressed his belief that Iran played a significant role in fostering the demonstrations, claiming that there was little to no involvement from the university's own students in the protests.

==== Infiltration ====
Experts raised concern about far-right groups attempting to infiltrate protests to cause harm, and subsequent reactions from militant far-left activists aligned with the anti-fascist movement.

American intelligence assessments concluded that Iran had covertly supported the protests using social media by posing as students with operatives providing financial assistance to some protest groups in an attempt to stoke division, but Director of National Intelligence Avril Haines said that U.S. citizens were protesting "in good faith" and that this intelligence "did not indicate otherwise". Qatar reportedly contributed $4.7 billion to U.S. academic institutions between 2001 and 2021; Kenneth Marcus of the Brandeis Center suggested this may have affected university administrators' willingness to impose discipline.

==== Counter-protesters ====
Far-right agitators and white nationalists were identified at some protests seeking to sow chaos and violence, and at the UCLA campus occupation, they were among pro-Israeli counter-protesters who attacked the encampment. A white supremacist affiliated with the Proud Boys was among the counter-protesters supported by far-right activists nationwide.

==== Advocacy groups ====
On October 25, Jonathan Greenblatt of the Anti-Defamation League (ADL) and Alyza D. Lewin and Kenneth L. Marcus of the Brandeis Center wrote university presidents a letter calling on them to investigate Students for Justice in Palestine (SJP) for "potential violations of the prohibition against materially supporting a foreign terrorist organization", adding, "universities must also update their code of conduct to ensure that harassment and support for terrorism have no place on campus."

The website Canary Mission published profiles of students and faculty members it considers antisemitic, and Betar US, a Zionist group, compiled a list of students to be deported.

== Controversies ==
=== Antisemitism allegations ===
Several protests were criticized for alleged antisemitism. Some students called some of the incidents reported at protests and on campus "threatening" and said they made them feel unsafe. Jewish students were targeted for their faith, for wearing Jewish symbols, or were accused of being Zionists and subsequently targeted. Some Jewish students also said the protests created a climate of fear and hate on campus. According to The Jewish Post, a survey by Hillel of Jewish students at universities with encampments found that most of them felt unsafe due to encampments. 72% of respondents wanted them dismantled and 61% considered language used at the protests antisemitic. The U.S. Department of Education concluded that University of Michigan and CUNY failed to assess whether the protests made the environment hostile.

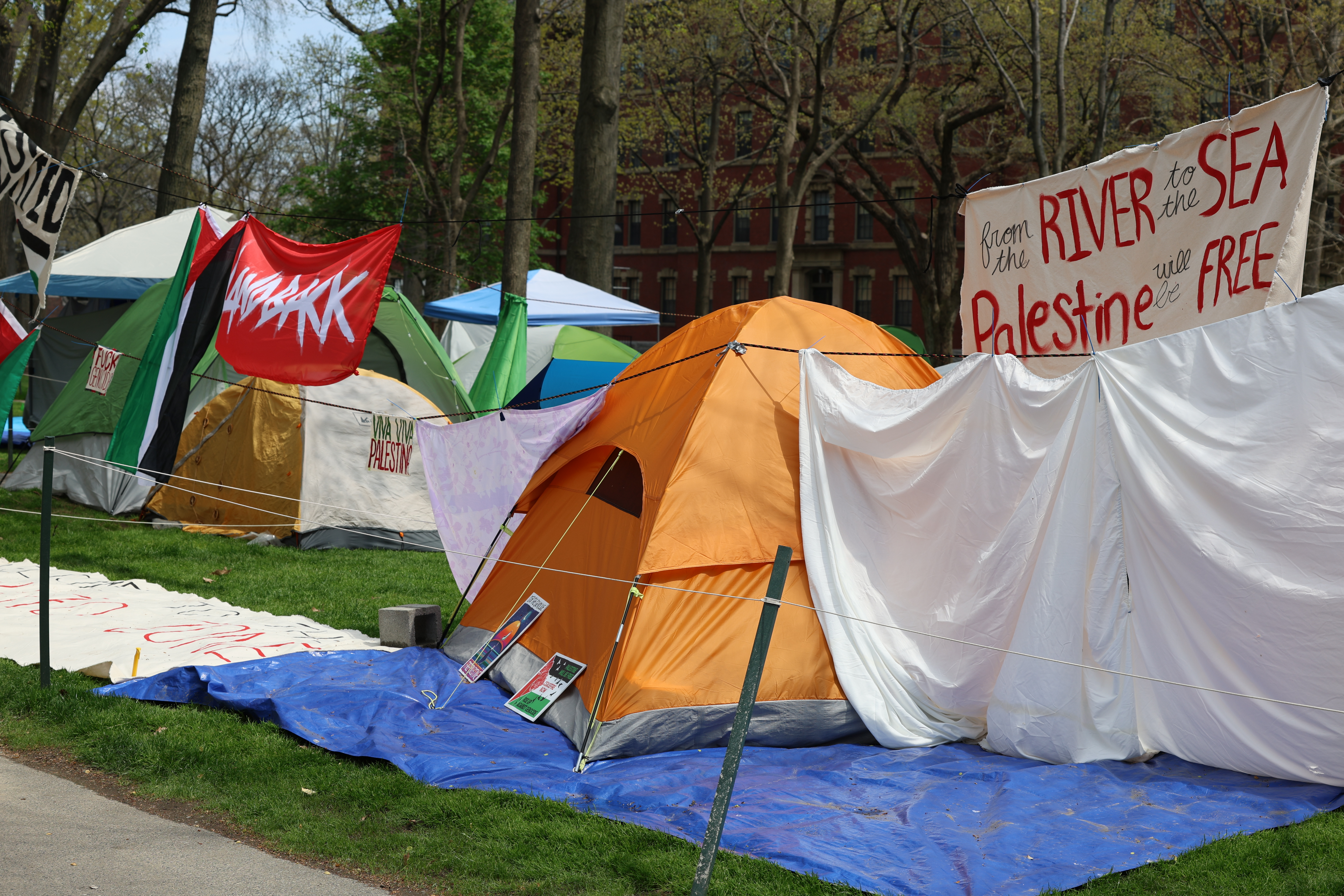
Encampment at Harvard University with the banner "from the river to the sea, Palestine will be free" (top right). According to The Guardian, the slogan often calls for the destruction of Israel, including its Jewish population.

Supporters of Israel and some students said that the word "intifada", the phrase "from the river to the sea", and chants comparing Israel and Zionism to Nazism were antisemitic. Others, including Jewish students, argued against conflating antisemitism with anti-Zionism, and said the charge was used to chill debate. Pro-Palestinian and Jewish student protesters said that the protests were not antisemitic. The Guardian noted that incidents of antisemitism appeared to be "relatively isolated" and likelier to occur when non-students were in a parallel protest. Pro-Palestinian student groups at the protests were quick to condemn inflammatory remarks.

Some pro-Palestinian Jewish students said they faced antisemitism from pro-Israel activists. Some commentators and politicians, including Mayor Eric Adams, U.S. Representative Virginia Foxx, and NYPD deputy commissioner of operations Kaz Daughtry, promoted a conspiracy theory that George Soros or some other anonymous figure funded the protest encampments by buying the same brand of tents for many protesters. In fact, the similar appearance of many encampment tents was due to online retailers' discounts and promotions of particular products.

In fall 2024, chants such as "Divest!" and "Ceasefire now!" reportedly evolved towards more explicitly endorsing Hamas, Hezbollah, and Houthis. Some protesters used slogans such as "Glory to the resistance!", called the October 7 attacks "Al-Aqsa flood", celebrated Yahya Sinwar, and used the Hamas inverted red triangle. Aidan Herzlinger, vice president of Baruch College's Hillel chapter, said students who attended a Hillel banquet at the college were called "baby killers" and "terrorists".

In November 2024, hundreds of posters depicting faculty members as "wanted" were spread across the University of Rochester campus. Some of the posters accused a Jewish faculty member of ethnic cleansing and contributing to the displacement of Palestinians; others accused a faculty member of racism, hate speech, and intimidation. University President Sarah Mangelsdorf called the incident an act of antisemitism.

==== Criticism of allegations of widespread antisemitism ====
In November 2023, Noah Zatz wrote:

[C]ontrary to the pervasive "both sides" framing of rising antisemitism and Islamophobia, this repressive wave is plainly asymmetric: there is no comparable institutional effort to suppress endorsements of the current Israeli state, despite its commitments to "Jewish supremacy" (as Israeli human rights organization B'Tselem and others describe it) and ongoing commission of war crimes like collective punishment of Gazans (even setting aside the "genocide" question). The ubiquitous justification offered for this stark asymmetry is that calls for Palestinian freedom constitute threats of antisemitic violence against Jews in Israel and the U.S. alike.

=== Allegations of anti-Palestinianism and Islamophobia ===
Pro-Palestinian protesters and their allies criticized the disposition of many university administrations as perpetuating a "Palestine exception" to academic freedom. Pro-Palestinian students and their allies raised concerns about anti-Palestinianism and Islamophobia. Investigations by the U.S. Department of Education were opened at Columbia, Emory University, the University of North Carolina, and at Umass Amherst over their administrations' response to student protests and advocacy since the start of the war.

=== Allegations of anti-Americanism and support for terror ===
In May 2024, the New York City Police Department shared images of items it said it had confiscated from a protest at NYU, including "gas masks, ear plugs, helmets, goggles, tape, hammers, knives, ropes, and a book on TERRORISM" that were taken from a student's backpack. One pamphlet read, "Death to America!" According to the Anti-Defamation League, on the first anniversary of the October 7 attacks, many of the over 100 protests included chants and other messages "filled with support for terrorist organizations" and symbols such as paragliders. Demonstrators at Columbia published a statement calling on students "to propagate the successes of the heroic Palestinian armed resistance in weakening Israel and U.S. imperialism and inspiring anti-imperialist struggles around the world".

=== Violence at protests ===
A study by the Armed Conflict Location and Event Data Project (ACLED) found that 97% of protests were nonviolent and nearly half of those that became violent involved protesters fighting with law enforcement during police interventions.

According to officials at Vanderbilt University, a security guard was injured when protesters broke into an administrative building, resulting in the expulsion of the three students leading the charge; video footage showed students forcibly entering the building and pushing past a guard into a door frame, injuring them. The guard was out of work for two weeks as a result of injuries. The students denied using violence, calling their protest peaceful.

Students and student journalists also faced violence at the hands of counter-protesters. One protester at Columbia was arrested and hospitalized after a counter-protester rammed his car into a group of picketers. Counter-protesters at the University of Pennsylvania approached the encampment with knives, and in a separate incident sprayed a chemical mixture on protesters' tents, food, and belongings.

U.S. House Speaker Mike Johnson and U.S. Senators Tom Cotton and Josh Hawley called for a deployment of the National Guard to college campuses, which journalist Adam Serwer and Laurel Krause, sister of Kent State shootings victim Allison Krause, characterized as alluding to past instances of violence against students, such as the Kent State and Jackson State killings.

==== Pro-Israeli attack at UCLA ====
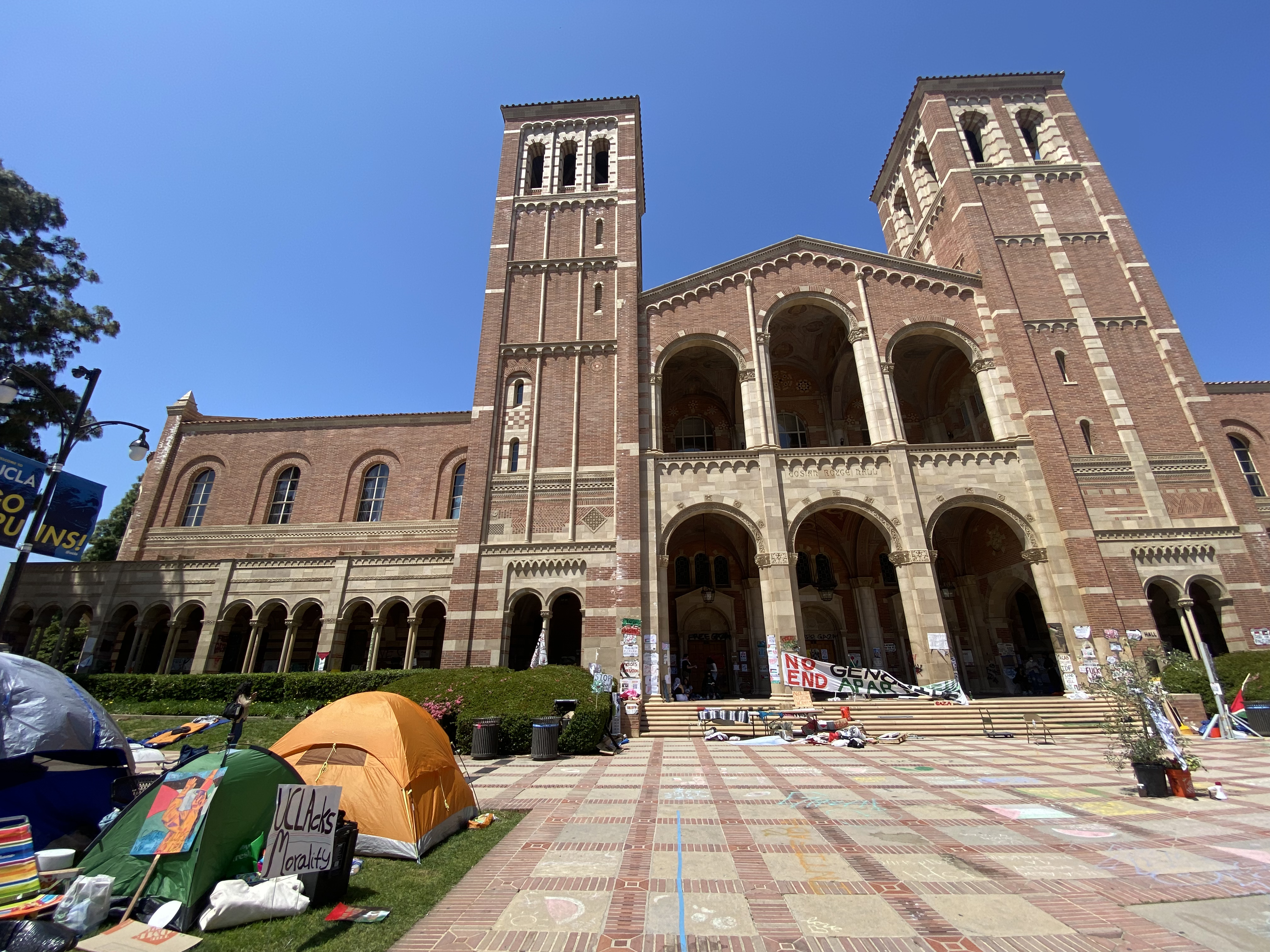
The UCLA campus occupation on April 30, the day it was attacked by pro-Israeli counter-protesters

On May 1, 2024, around 10:50 PM, a pro-Israeli group attacked the University of California, Los Angeles (UCLA) pro-Palestinian protesters' camp for nearly four hours, attempting to breach the barricades surrounding it. The attackers, reported to have come from outside campus, carried Israeli flags and assaulted students with sticks, stones, poles, metal fencing, and pepper spray. They played loud audio of a child crying, threw wood and a metal barrier into the camp, and threw at least six fireworks into the encampment, including one directly at a group of protesters carrying injured people.

A video investigation suggested pro-Palestinian protesters did not initiate any confrontation but acted in defense. The counter-protesters called for a "Second Nakba", referring to the ethnic cleansing of Palestinians in 1948, and played the Israeli national anthem and Harbu Darbu on loudspeakers during the attack. According to The Guardian, counter-protesters included several far-right activists involved in anti-LGBTQ+ and anti-vaccine campaigning. The Boston Review reported that Zionist counter-protesters joined forces with white supremacists and Neo-Nazis, and that "One neo-Nazi was heard shouting, 'we’re here to finish what Hitler started,' without any apparent protest from the self-identified Zionists."

=== Vandalism and property damage ===
At Portland State, protesters damaged computers and furniture during their occupation of the campus library. At Columbia, protesters shattered windows during their occupation of Hamilton Hall. Police and city workers destroyed students' tents, flags and other encampment supplies while disbanding the encampment at the University of Pennsylvania. At George Washington University, protesters defaced a statue of its namesake, President George Washington. The statue was wrapped with Palestinian scarves and flags, with the words "Genocidal Warmonger University" spray-painted on its base.

Students replaced U.S. flags with Palestinian flags on flagpoles at several universities. In Harvard Yard, student demonstrators affixed three Palestinian flags atop the John Harvard statue on April 27. The replacement of U.S. flags sparked outrage from some officials, such as New York Mayor Eric Adams. In response, university administrations and law enforcement agencies intervened to take down the Palestinian flags and reinstate U.S. flags to their original positions.

== Responses and reactions ==
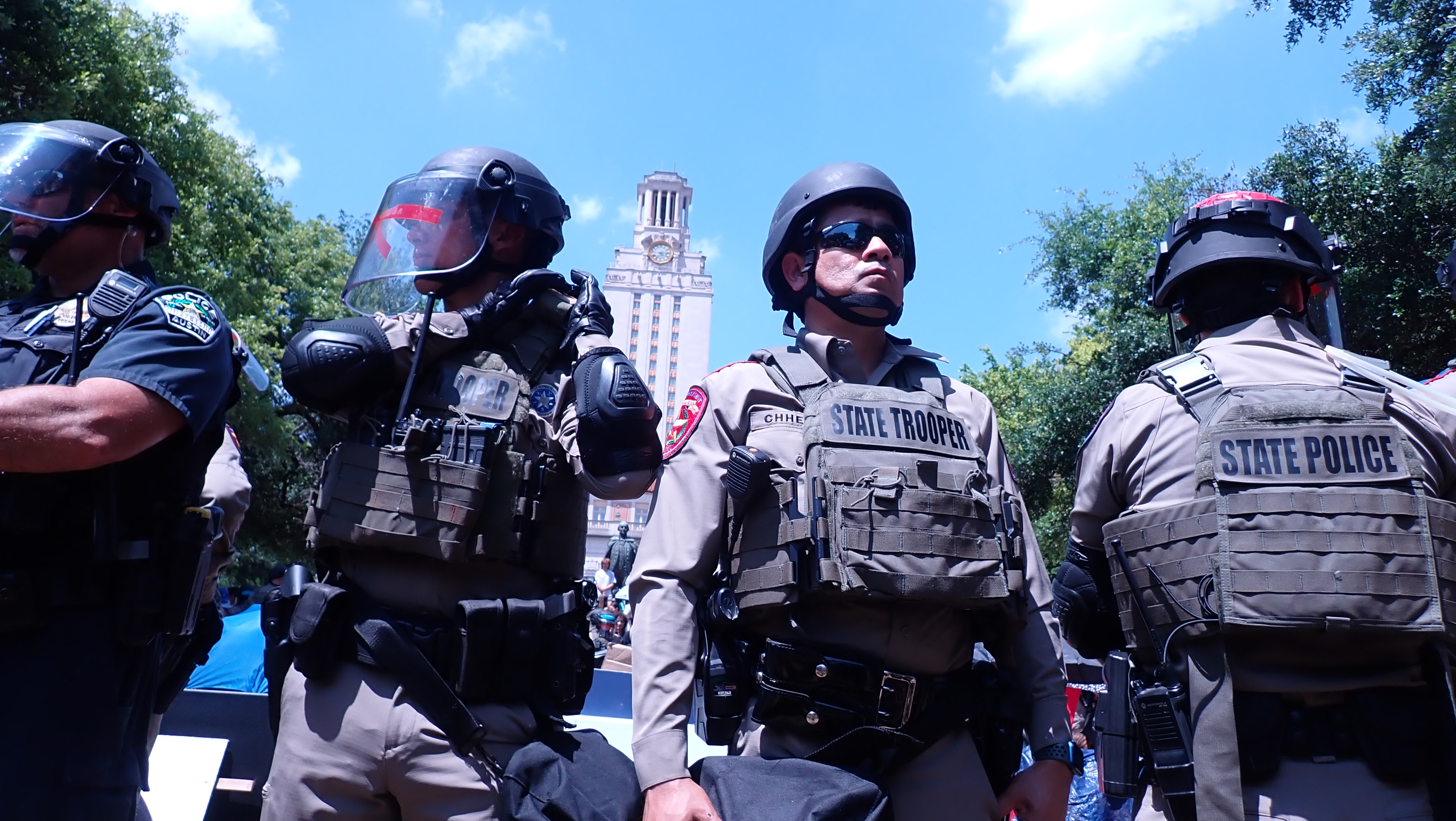
State troopers occupy parts of UT Austin campus to confront protesters, April 2024.

With over 3,100 protesters arrested, universities suspended and expelled student protesters, in some cases evicting them from campus housing, and relied on police to forcibly disband occupations.

Most universities that faced encampment protests in the spring attempted to negotiate a disbandment of the encampments, often threatening police sweeps to force an agreement. Many universities initiated disciplinary proceedings against protesters, accusing them of breaking student codes of conduct. In July 2025, Columbia University disciplined at least 70 students who took part in campus protests with probation, suspensions, degree revocations, and expulsions. Police departments employed a range of tactics, including dispersing crowds using horses and police in riot gear, deploying pepper balls, using tasers, mass arrests, and tear gas, clearing unauthorized encampments, and beating both students and professors. Police also assaulted, arrested and restricted access for some journalists while they were covering the protests. Some Democrats and human rights organizations criticized the police response. By fall 2024, many universities had strengthened their restrictions on protests, including more than 100 colleges and universities, and several schools had banned camping on their grounds.

Over 200 groups expressed support for the protests, as well as U.S. Senator Bernie Sanders, various members of Congress, several labor unions, hundreds of university staff in the United Kingdom, and Iran's supreme leader Ali Khamenei. Protests were condemned by leaders including President Joe Biden, Prime Minister of the Netherlands Mark Rutte, Israeli Prime Minister Benjamin Netanyahu, and Australian Prime Minister Anthony Albanese. UK Prime Minister Rishi Sunak and Canadian Prime Minister Justin Trudeau raised concerns.

According to legal scholar Shirin Sinnar, the repression of campus protests from university administrators in the 2023–24 academic year facilitated authoritarianism under the Trump administration. The "failure to rebut politicized narratives that pro-Palestine protests were rampant with violence, antisemitism, and lawlessness has made it harder for academic institutions to resist the even greater weaponization of such caricatures now", Sinnar wrote, adding:

The denunciation of these protests as violating the norms of civil disobedience, based on simplistic understandings of theories of civil disobedience, has made it easier to cast student protestors as agents of chaos and disorder without a moral message and demand on society. It is far easier to punish higher education institutions for permitting protests—and to disappear students from their dorm rooms and the streets—when campus protestors have been vilified over the course of more than a year. The new speech and protest policies that many colleges and universities adopted, even before the Trump administration returned to power, challenged the rule of law within these institutions, whether viewed in formalist, substantive, governance, or procedural terms. Having ceded so much ground already, it is a small step for some colleges and universities to acquiesce entirely to the relentless threats now levied against them. Such acquiescence will not only undermine these institutions' missions of research and teaching, but also undercut their ability to act as an independent preserve of inquiry and dissent in the face of mounting authoritarianism.

On October 8, 2026, the Middle East Studies Association (MESA) released a report saying that its Academic Freedom Initiative had documented 196 incidents of employment retaliation against higher education employees in the U.S. and Canada tied to Palestine-related speech and advocacy between October 7, 2023, and August 20, 2026. Of those 196 incidents, 76 ended in termination. The report's conclusions were drawn from an analysis of the incidents it recorded and interviews with 31 employees who faced retaliation.

== Corporate condemnation ==
Numerous U.S. corporate leaders announced that they wished to know the protesters' names in order to prevent them from working in their firms. Among them were Davis Polk & Wardwell, Pershing Square Capital Management, shopping club FabFitFun, health tech startup EasyHealth, Dovehill Capital Management, and restaurant chain Sweetgreen.

== Opinion polls and referendums ==
A May 2024 divestment referendum at DePaul University returned a 91% vote in favor of divestment. In April 2024, Columbia College voted on three divestment questions. The first asked whether Columbia should divest from Israel, the second asked whether it should cancel the Tel Aviv Global Center program, and the third asked whether Columbia should end its dual degree program with Tel Aviv University. The motions passed by 76%, 68%, and 65%, respectively, with 40% voter participation. Students at the University of Pennsylvania voted 73% in favor of disclosing all investments in the school's endowment and 63% in favor of ending the university's relationship with Ghost Robotics, with 22% voter participation.

According to a YouGov poll released on May 3, 2024, 47% of Americans opposed the campus protests and 28% supported them. American Muslims supported the protests by 75% to 14% while Jewish Americans opposed them by 72% to 18%. Adults under 45 were more likely to support them than older adults. 33% believed the response to the protests was not harsh enough, 16% believed it was too harsh, and 20% believed the response was about right. 48% of Americans over 45 believed the response was not harsh enough, compared to only 16% under 45.

According to an Axios poll released on May 7, 2024, 8% of college students participated in the protests. 34% blame Hamas, 19% blame Netanyahu, 12% blame the Israeli people, and 12% blame Biden for the destruction in Gaza. 81% of students supported holding protesters accountable for destroyed property and illegally occupied buildings, 67% considered occupying campus buildings unacceptable, 58% considered refusal to disperse unacceptable, and 90% opposed blocking pro-Israel students. Students were more likely to support the pro-Palestinian encampments, with 45% who supported them strongly or moderately, 30% neutral, and 24% strongly or mildly opposed. Among those who participated in anti-Israeli protests, 58% said they would not be friends with someone who had marched for Israel, while 64% of students who marched in favor of Israel said they would still be friends with anti-Israeli protesters.

In a Data for Progress poll in collaboration with Zeteo released on May 8, 2024, 55% of Democrats, 36% of Republicans, and 46% of all likely voters said they disapproved of colleges limiting students' rights and ability to protest Israel's military operations, whereas 32% of Democrats, 49% of Republicans, and 40% of all likely voters approved of doing so. Overall, 40% approved and 42% disapproved of the protests.

In Canada, 19% of respondents supported the protesters and 48% of respondents opposed the protests.

== Analysis ==
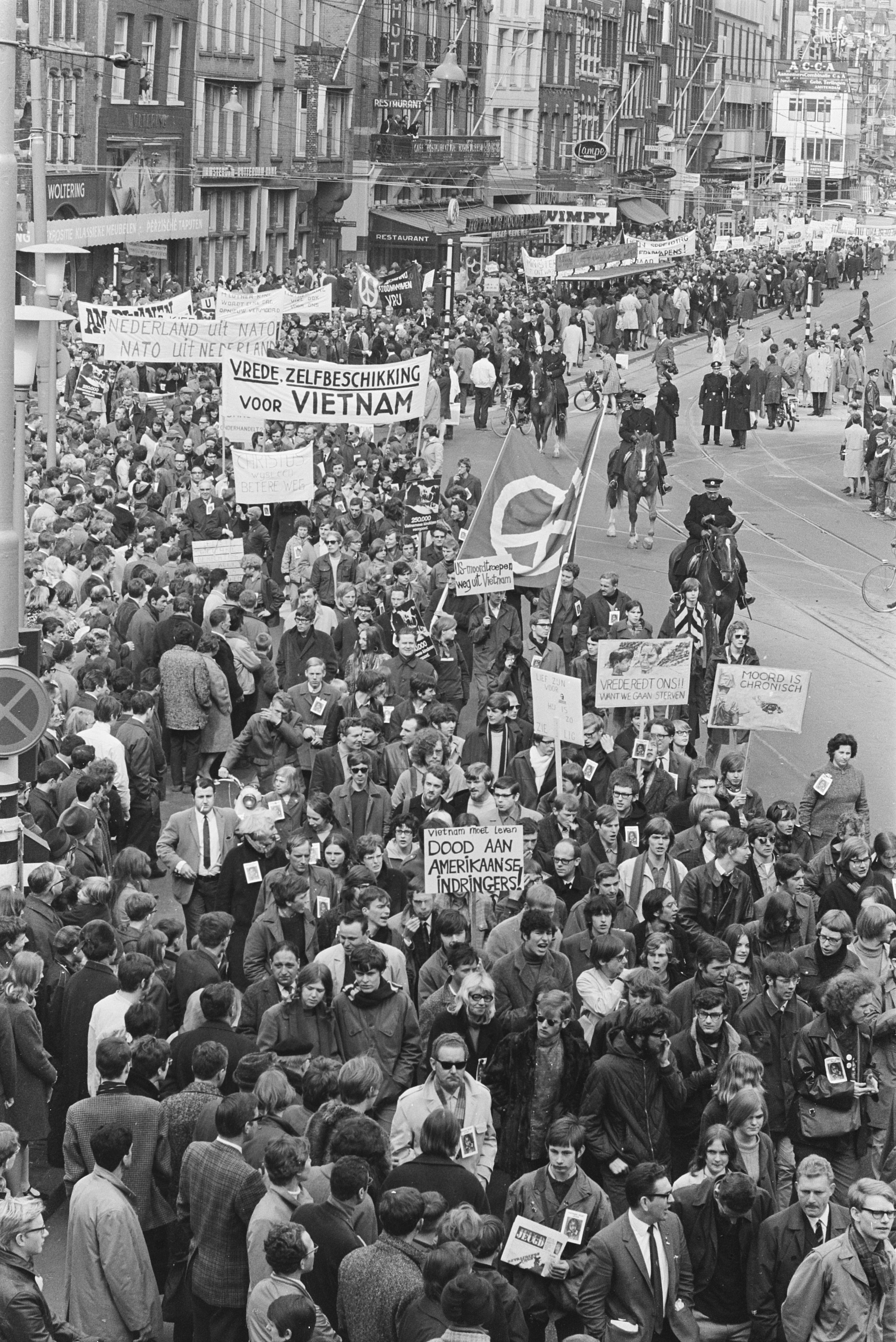
Demonstrations against the Vietnam War in Amsterdam, 1968

=== Comparisons ===
The Guardian called the protests "perhaps the most significant student movement since the anti-Vietnam campus protests of the late 1960s". Protests at Columbia were compared to the 1968 protests due to their scale and tactics, and as echoing the 1968 movement. According to The Independent, protesters studied the 1968 movement. A Columbia undergraduate said that student organizers learned from the experiences of older generations, calling the movement "completely built" on the legacy of the 1968 protests. Mark Rudd, who led protests against the Vietnam War at Columbia in the 1960s, said, "For me, it's the most normal thing in the world to look at the murder of 34,000 people and the displacement of close to 2 million in Gaza and say, 'Hey, stop!" Laurel Krause, the sister of Kent State shooting victim Allison Krause said she not only supported the protests and asked university leaders to listen to their demands, but condemned the militarized response by campus authorities to disperse protests, saying that it endangered students' lives and rights to free expression.

Former Columbia student leaders from the era of protests against apartheid in the 1980s, including BDS co-founder Omar Barghouti and historian Barbara Ransby, said the "intersecting issues of war, racism and colonialism" were focal points in the movements of 1968, the 1980s, and 2024—and that the similarities are clear among the periods. The New York Times reported that some scholars considered the protests starkly different from those against the Vietnam War or apartheid South Africa. According to Timothy Naftali, protests against Vietnam in the 1960s did not result in a constituency that felt attacked as an ethnicity, and that the pro-Palestinian demonstrations created "a feeling of insecurity in a much bigger way than the antiwar demonstrations during Vietnam did". New England Patriots owner Robert Kraft said current college protests contain "further echoes of the forces that helped give rise to the Nazis", while Columbia University's Chabad chapter said that phrases like "Go back to Poland" and "stop killing children" had been yelled at Jewish students. In May 2024, some Jewish students on campus said they believed that support for Israel was a "litmus test" leading to their exclusion from campus social life. In September 2024, after many harassment complaints, the University of Illinois Urbana-Champaign banned the ostracism of Jewish students from school clubs for identifying as Zionist.

=== Political criticism ===
Far-right influencers and some Republicans portrayed the protests as violent, a "Marxist takeover," and "terrorism". The New York Times opined that the protests came during a presidential election year in which Democrats had "harnessed promises of stability and normalcy to win critical recent elections" and that the protests were a messaging opportunity for Republicans to divide Democrats. The newspaper also published an article citing NewsGuard, the Institute for Strategic Dialogue, the Foundation for Defense of Democracies, the Australian Strategic Policy Institute, and Recorded Future on how the media of Russia, China, and Iran had covered the events. It concluded that those countries had made overt and covert efforts to capitalize on the protests to denigrate democracy, inflame partisan tensions, criticize Biden ahead of the 2024 presidential election, support Trump, and express support for Hamas and Palestinians generally.

Both Columbia Professor of Journalism Helen Benedict and Johns Hopkins political science professor Daniel Schlozman remarked that Republican fixation on criticizing universities as bastions of leftist ideology had resulted in portrayals of the protests as examples of radicalism on race and gender issues as a way to divide Democrats. A Jewish Currents editor described the movement as providing "cover for the right to expand its attack on protest" in reference to the "draconian" crackdown on protests, saying the "attacks on academic freedom and free speech on campus" were led by right-wingers. Republicans used antisemitic tropes when denouncing protests as antisemitic, including allusions to conspiracies around George Soros and invoking globalists. In May 2025, The New York Times found that the second Trump administration had called for or implemented over half the proposals of The Heritage Foundation's Project Esther, a conservative program to suppress pro-Palestinian protests and what it classifies as antisemitism.

=== Spread of protests ===
Initially, The New York Times wrote that protests outside the U.S. were "sporadic and smaller, and none [started] a wider student movement". The "partisan political context" was given as a reason for the intensity of protests in the U.S. Columbia's status as an Ivy League school, its proximity to New York City and national news media, and its large population of Jewish students were described as fueling increased media attention and political scrutiny that helped spread the protests. According to a Washington Monthly study in May, pro-Palestinian demonstrations and encampments were more prevalent at elite U.S. universities. The magazine wrote, "in the vast majority of cases, campuses that educate students mostly from working-class backgrounds have not had any protest activity."

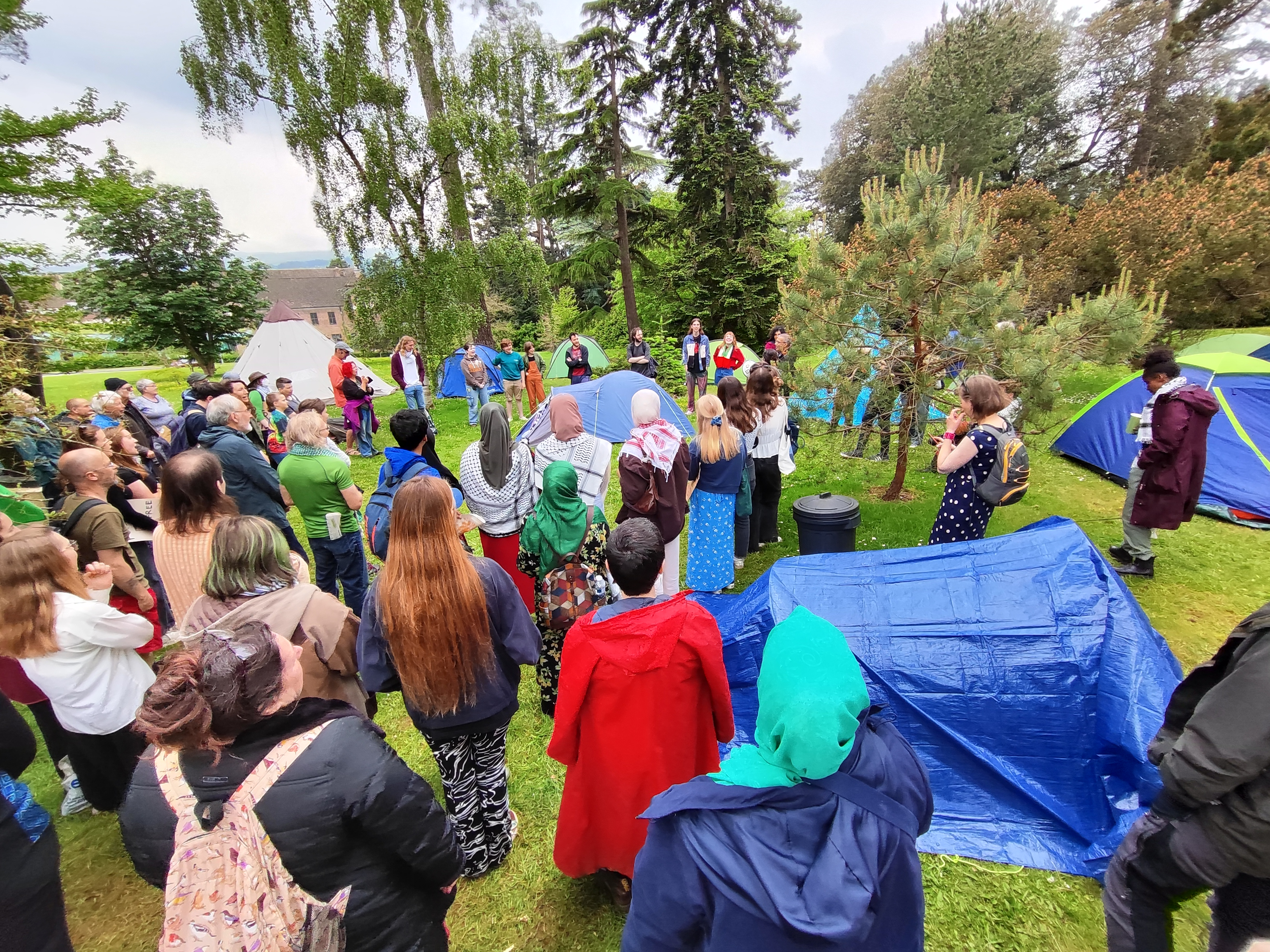
Protest camp at the University of Exeter, United kingdom. By May 7, student encampments had spread to twenty universities in the UK.

On May 3, NPR described the protests abroad as "a growing global student movement", with student protests in the United Kingdom focused on "an increasingly high-profile nationwide campaign to end British arms exports to Israel". According to NBC News, the protests abroad inspired by protests in the U.S. did not have the intensity of U.S. protests. By May 7, protests had escalated in Europe after mass arrests at the University of Amsterdam, with occupations of campus buildings in Germany, France, and Belgium, and encampments on several European campuses. The Associated Press described protests at Sciences Po in Paris as "echoing similar encampments and solidarity demonstrations across the United States". By May 9, protests were widespread at universities in India, Pakistan, Bangladesh and Sri Lanka, while smaller ones were held at Japanese and South Korean universities.

Media coverage of the protests was criticized as sensationalized and failing to focus on the protesters' demands and grievances. Dana Bash was criticized for likening college protests to the rise of antisemitism in the 1930s in Europe. The lack of student protesters' voices in most national media coverage was also criticized. Student reporters, in particular, were praised for their work covering the protests.

== In 2025 ==
2025 pro-Palestinian protests on university campuses
- Part of Gaza war protests
- Date: January 2025 – ongoing
- Location: Global (primarily Australia, Canada, the Netherlands, UK, and US)
- Caused by: Israeli invasion of Gaza, ongoing genocide of Palestinians, university ties with Israeli institutions and companies, opposition to Israeli military actions, calls for academic and financial divestment
- Goals: University divestment from Israel and companies supplying the Israeli military; Severance of academic and research ties with Israeli institutions; Institutional transparency about investments and partnerships; Amnesty for student protesters; Support for Palestinian academic freedom and a ceasefire in Gaza
- Methods: Protests; Encampments; Occupations; Walkouts; Sit-ins; Strikes; Teach-ins; Hunger strikes
- Status: Ongoing
- Result: Dozens of universities released statements or lists of collaborations with Israeli entities; Some institutions froze or ended ties with Israeli partners or military contractors; Widespread police interventions, mass arrests, and suspensions

The global wave of student- and staff-led demonstrations on university campuses continued in 2025, with protests at hundreds of campuses in North America, Europe, Australia, Africa, and Asia. Inspired by the anti-apartheid and Vietnam War campus protests, students and faculty called for divestment, academic boycott, and institutional transparency about ties to Israel and military contractors. The movement intensified in 2025 after Israel's offensive in Rafah and renewed violence in Gaza, as well as solidarity actions in response to police crackdowns on US campuses.

=== Key universities involved ===
==== North America ====
In the United States, at Columbia University, there were renewed encampments and building occupations, including the occupation of Butler Library ("Basel Al-Araj Popular University"). There were mass arrests by the NYPD and over 100 students were suspended or barred from campus. In July 2025, Columbia disciplined at least 70 students who took part in campus protests, with punishments including probation, suspensions, degree revocations, and expulsions. At the University of Washington, protesters occupied an engineering building, demanding an end to ties with Boeing over its military contracts. More than 30 protesters were arrested after police intervention. Thirty-four people were arrested inside the School of Engineering building and over $1 million in damage was done to the structure.

In Canada, after a three-day student protest that included blockades and vandalism, the Quebec Superior Court issued a 10-day injunction barring pro-Palestinian protesters at McGill University from obstructing campus access or disrupting academic activities. Citing threats to safety and academic continuity, McGill sought legal intervention amid calls for divestment from companies linked to Israel. It has also initiated steps to sever ties with the undergraduate student union over its alleged failure to distance itself from disruptive activism.

==== Europe ====
In Germany, Berlin police cleared a protest in April 2025 at Humboldt University, where 89 pro-Palestinian demonstrators had occupied a lecture hall to oppose the planned deportation of four international students accused of participating in violent protests. The police launched around 100 criminal investigations related to the occupation, citing vandalism, use of incendiary objects, and alleged extremist symbols. The university justified police intervention partly due to banners denying Israel's right to exist, an issue sensitive in Germany due to its post-Holocaust commitment to supporting Israel. Germany is facing criticism for issuing orders to deport four pro-Palestinian activists who have been convicted of no crimes.

In the Netherlands there were occupations and encampments at the University of Amsterdam, Utrecht University, Radboud University, and others. Several protests were met with police intervention, with students sustaining injuries.

In the United Kingdom, members of Oxford Action for Palestine occupied the Radcliffe Camera, protesting the alleged complicity of the University of Oxford in Israeli military actions in Gaza and the West Bank and accusing the institution of cutting off dialogue. The university condemned the disruption, citing safety concerns, and said it was working to remove the protesters, who had renamed the library after a Palestinian political figure linked to a group several Western governments have designated a terrorist organization. At the University of Glasgow, students from the Justice for Palestine Society disrupted campus events in April, calling for divestment from arms companies accused of complicity in what they describe as genocide in Gaza. Across the UK, over 100 students and staff have faced disciplinary action, with some universities reportedly working with private intelligence firms to monitor protests.

=== Protesters' demands ===
Demands vary by country and campus, but commonly include:

- Divestment from Israel and companies supplying the Israeli military (e.g., Boeing, Lockheed Martin, Caterpillar Inc.)
- Severing academic and research ties with Israeli institutions
- Disclosure of financial and research partnerships
- Amnesty for suspended or arrested protesters
- Institutional support for Palestinian academic freedom and a ceasefire in Gaza

=== Reactions ===
Many universities called on police to clear encampments and occupations, resulting in mass arrests and suspensions of students and faculty. Some institutions agreed to partial demands, including publishing lists of ties to Israeli entities or freezing select partnerships.

The US government threatened funding cuts to universities that did not address alleged antisemitism or campus unrest, and some protesters faced deportation proceedings. Civil liberties groups and faculty organizations expressed concern over free speech, academic freedom, and the militarization of campus policing. In July 2025, Columbia University disciplined at least 70 students who took part in campus protests, with punishments including probation, suspensions, degree revocations, and expulsions.

In October 2025, Syracuse University chancellor Kent Syverud said the protests on campus seemed to have been encouraged by Iran. He emphasized that, although there was an initially welcoming atmosphere for both pro-Israel and pro-Palestinian activities, a noticeable shift occurred later. Syverud expressed his belief that Iran played a significant role in fostering the demonstrations, claiming that there was little to no involvement from the university's own students in the protests.

In Canada, after pro-Palestinian protests at the University of Toronto and a more than 60-day encampment on its St. George campus, the University of Toronto Faculty Association (UTFA) voted to divest from Israel, citing its opposition to what it called Israel's "illegal occupation" of Palestinian territories. The motion, which passed with 52% support, urges the Ontario University Pension Plan to swiftly divest from entities linked to the occupation or arms production potentially used by Israel in Palestine, aligning the move with the university’s existing divestment policy on Russia.

In the Netherlands, the University of Amsterdam, Tilburg University, Utrecht University, Erasmus University Rotterdam, and Radboud University have cut ties with nine Israeli institutes, with some also suspending future collaborations.

In the UK, King’s College Cambridge announced divestment from arms and companies involved in the Israeli occupation.

In Ireland, Trinity College Dublin severed all ties with Israeli universities and companies, becoming the first Irish university to fully divest. This includes ending investments, commercial relations, academic collaborations, and Erasmus+ exchanges. The move follows a taskforce review and a five-day student encampment protesting the college's ties to Israel. The university had investments in 13 Israeli companies, some linked to illegal settlements. The decision was praised by student leaders and politicians, who called it a model for other institutions to follow.

== See also ==
- International reactions to the Gaza war
- Kent State shootings, in 1970, National Guard killed 4 students at Ohio university during Vietnam war protest
- Occupy Wall Street, in 2011
- Nationwide student anti-war strike of 1970
- 1985–1986 Dartmouth College anti-apartheid protests
- Academic boycott of South Africa
- Anti-Zionism on Campus
- Antisemitism during the Gaza war
- Student activism
- Boycott, Divestment and Sanctions
- Project Esther
- Canary Mission
- List of pro-Palestinian protests on university campuses in 2024
- Columbia University pro-Palestinian campus protests and occupations during the Gaza war
- Academic boycott of Israel
