= Anti-Zionism on Campus =

Study of anti-Zionism

- Author: Andrew Pessin, Doron Ben-Atar
- Publisher: Indiana University Press
- Publication date: 2018

Anti-Zionism on Campus: The University, Free Speech, and BDS is a 2018 book edited by Andrew Pessin and Doron Ben-Atar about anti-Israel political activism and antisemitism on American university campuses. Writing in Commentary, Gil Troy says that it is the first university press book to delve into "systematic assaults against Israel—and by extension Jews". Judea Pearl, director of the Cognitive Systems Laboratory at UCLA, calls it an "important book.". David Mikics in his article about Anti-Zionism described it as "new collection of essays by professors and students who have been victims of BDS."

Anti-Zionism on Campus is a collection of first-person accounts by scholars who say they have been the target of antisemitic agitation on American university campuses. Jonathan Kirsch writing in The Jewish Journal of Greater Los Angeles called these chapters a "parade of horribles" in which students attending routine social and academic events such as "talks by famous people about their Jewish heritage, campus Shabbat dinners, and Hillel student meetings,” are accosted by protestors shouting anti-Israel slogans.
