= Andrew Pessin =

American philosopher

Andrew Pessin is an American philosopher who is currently a professor of philosophy at Connecticut College.

== Biography ==
Pessin is a graduate of Yale University and holds a PhD from Columbia University. He teaches at Connecticut College. In addition to his academic work he has published a number of philosophy books for the general reader, as well as four novels. His most recent novel, The Irrationalist: The Tragic Murder of René Descartes, is a historical murder mystery based on real events: the life of the famous 17th-century philosopher and mathematician René Descartes, and the mysterious circumstances surrounding his death.

According to Paul Cliteur, writing in Philosophy Now, Pessin's The God Question discusses "discussions about the existence of God," as quite often being, "discussions about the compatibility of the characteristics ascribed to the divine in the theistic tradition. Those who held that those characteristics are compatible were called 'theists': those who did not, 'atheists.'"

Pessin appeared in several episodes of the Late Show with David Letterman in the early 1990s in a sketch called The Strong Guy, The Fat Guy, The Genius. He played The Genius.

In 2015, Pessin was involved in controversy after a 2014 Facebook post resurfaced in which Pessin compared "the situation in Gaza" during the 2014 Gaza War to "a rabid pit bull is chained in a cage” that when set free “comes roaring bounding out, snarling, going for the throat.” Pessin later clarified that the post was referring to Hamas specifically and not Palestinians.

== Books ==
- The Jewish God Question: What Jewish Thinkers Have Said About God, The Book, The People, and the Land, Rowman & Littlefield, 2015.
- Anti-Zionism on Campus: The University, Free Speech, and BDS, Indiana University Press, 2018.
- The Irrationalist: The Tragic Murder of René Descartes, a novel, Open Books, 2017.
- The Study of Philosophy: A Text With Readings (7th Edn), Rowman & Littlefield, 2015.
- Uncommon Sense: The Strangest Ideas From The Smartest Philosophers (named by Choice an "Outstanding Academic Title of 2013") Rowman & Littlefield.
- The Second Daughter, a novel under the pen name J. Jeffrey, Winter Goose Press 2014.
- The Philosophy of Mind, audio course and book, The Modern Scholar, 2010.
- The God Question: What Famous Thinkers From Plato to Dawkins Have Said About the Divine, Oneworld, 2009.
- The 60-Second Philosopher: Expand Your Mind on a Minute or so a Day!, Oneworld, 2009.
- Gray Matters: An Introduction to the Philosophy of Mind, M.E. Sharpe, 1997.
- The Twin Earth Chronicles: Twenty Years of Reflection on Hilary Putnam's "The Meaning of Meaning", with Sanford Goldberg, (edited collection) M. E. Sharpe, 1996.
