= 2024 University of Pennsylvania pro-Palestine campus encampment =

Protest at the University of Pennsylvania

- Part of Gaza war protests (in the US • at universities (in 2024 (in the US)))
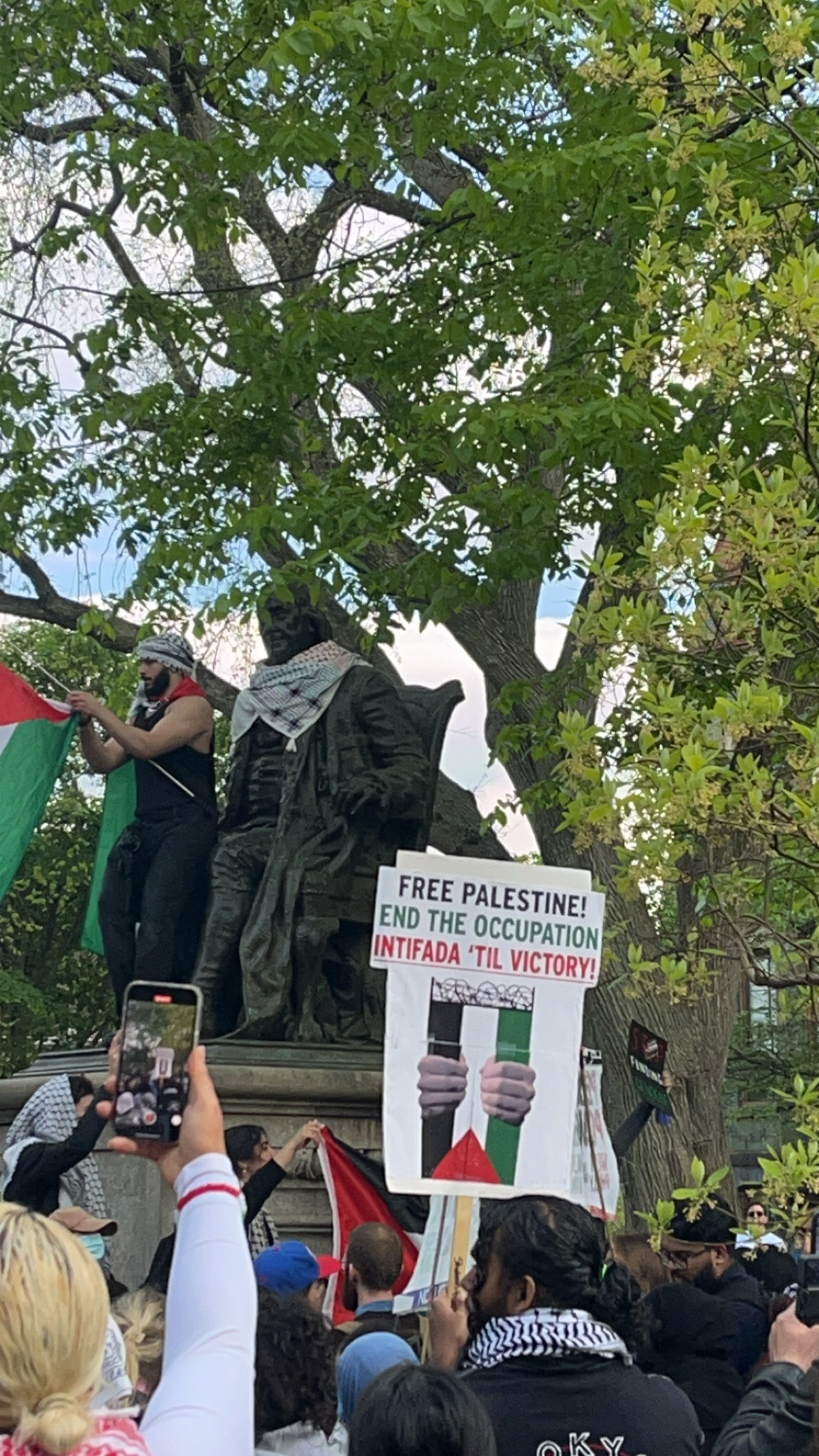
- Benjamin Franklin statue on UPenn Campus with a Palestinian Keffiyeh during first day of encampment
- Date: April 25–May 10, 2024 (2 weeks and 1 day)
- Location: University of Pennsylvania, Philadelphia, Pennsylvania, United States
- Caused by: Gaza war; Opposition to University of Pennsylvania's investments in Israel
- Goals: University of Pennsylvania's divestment from Israel
- Methods: Protests; Occupation; Civil disobedience; Picketing
- Result: Protesters suppressed: PPD raids campus on May 10th; Student participants suspended

Parties
Pro-Palestinian groups:
Gaza Solidarity Encampment:
- Penn Against the Occupation

On April 25, students at University of Pennsylvania began an encampment to protest the ongoing Gaza war and to call for divestment from Israel. The occupation, named the "Gaza Solidarity Encampment," was part of a series of 2024 pro-Palestinian protests on university campuses. On May 10, the encampment was raided and protesters were arrested, ending the occupation.

== Background ==
The campus had been embroiled in controversy for months following the resignation of University President Liz Magill in December 2023 after backlash to her testimony at a congressional hearing. The university had suspended a pro-Palestinian student organization, Penn Against the Occupation, on April 20 for failing to comply with university policies. The student group alleged the investigation leading to the suspension of the organization had not been completed, and no clear criteria for the removal of the group had been given. Penn's Muslim Students Association (MSA) and Penn Israel Public Affairs Committee attempted to seek dueling referendums for the student body, calling alternatively for a vote to divest or maintain investments in Israel.

== Timeline ==
=== April 25th - May 9th: Encampment ===
Marches from Philadelphia City Hall, a faculty walkout, along with student protesters from Drexel were coordinated to arrive on UPenn campus, to set up an encampment on the campus' College Green area.

On April 28, a man with a pro-Israel shirt and a knife holster entered a Passover Seder held in the encampment, before having his knives confiscated and being arrested. UPenn fire marshals swept the encampment for "fire hazards" the same day. Protesters led a controversial chant, “Al Qassam, make us proud, take another soldier down” while the Split Button monument in front of the Van Pelt Library was graffitied.

On April 29, a self-identified Christian Zionist confronted protesters with a large Israeli flag and attempted to argue and yell for two hours before being asked to move away from the encampment by a university official.

On May 1, the seventh day of the encampment at the University of Pennsylvania, a man was arrested after spraying the encampment with an unknown chemical substance.

On May 8, the encampment expanded to additional areas on College Green, in response to alleged "continued bad-faith negotiation" by administration.

=== May 10: Police raid, and subsequent protest ===
Originally, Philadelphia mayor Cherelle Parker opposed utilizing police action, despite Jameson's pleas for intervention, but decided to take action after expansion of the encampment on May 8. On May 10, police entered the encampment and dismantled it. Police and city workers destroyed students' tents, flags, and other belongings while disbanding the encampment, disposing of them in garbage trucks where they were shredded. 33 protesters were arrested, including 9 UPenn students, although they were soon after released. 5 UPenn faculty were also arrested for attempting to physically block police vehicles. In response, UPenn's Faculty Senate chair resigned, citing the response of the university to use the police.

A protest was organized hastily against the interim president Larry Jameson's on-campus house. A "primal scream" was held against the president, inspired by a similar protest against Columbia University President Minouche Shafik. During the scream, the gate to the house grounds was shaken by protesters before being forced open, allowing two protesters to enter the grounds of the house before immediately being repelled. Protesters alleged two instances of police aggression, causing the march to pause for some minutes until a medic could take care of a protester.

=== May 18: Attempted occupation ===
A group of students attempted to occupy Fisher Bennett Hall on campus, renaming it to Refaat Alareer Hall, in response to the disbandment of the encampment and alleged "series of escalations by Penn administration". The occupation was unsuccessful and police arrested 19 protesters, including 7 UPenn students. One arrested protester was noted to be throwing up, and had to seek medical support after police stated she had "hit her head". Pro-Palestinian protesters gathered soon after the arrests, while police maintained barricades. Protesters, after gathering around Fisher Bennett Hall, moved towards a UPenn alumni event being held and disrupted the event from outside the gates of the Penn Museum, causing it to end early.

=== Aftermath ===
An encampment was established on Drexel University, just north of UPenn campus, on May 19. Some senior students from UPenn who had participated in the encampment were not permitted to graduate on May 20, prompting protests. Penn Against the Occupation and some students alleged harassment and targeted behavior from some guards for wearing a keffiyah during graduation day. Administration banned 24 non-affiliates who had been in the encampment from campus. Administration also forced mandatory suspension on up to 6 students, and forcibly suspended 4 students for up to 1-2 semesters for their involvement with pro-Palestinian advocacy.

Police raided the homes of some pro-Palestine student organizers in October.

In the aftermath of protests, administration created a new set of standards and rules governing expression. The policy banned encampments and severely restricts many of the previous tactics used by organizers. An analysis by the student newspaper found that the new rules had open contradictions and ambiguities.

== Responses ==
Governor Josh Shapiro called on the university to disband the encampment. After the disbandment, both Shapiro and Senator Bob Casey Jr. praised the university's decision.

A referendum held by UPenn's Muslim Students Association calling for the administration to disclose and divest from Israel was held. More than 65% of the student population voted to divest, though university president Jameson rebuffed the results and reiterated opposition to the measures.
