= Doron Ben-Atar =

American dramatist

Doron Ben-Atar (Hebrew: דורון בן-אתר; born 25 May 1957) is an Israeli-born American historian and playwright. He is a professor of history at Fordham University in New York City.

== Biography ==
Doron Ben-Atar was born in Kfar Shmaryahu, Israel. His father, Arye Ben-Atar, immigrated to Mandatory Palestine from Turkey in 1936. He was a basketball player for Maccabi Tel Aviv. His mother is a Holocaust survivor from Poland. In 2006, Ben-Atar wrote a play based on his mother's experiences, Behave Yourself Quietly. In the 1970s, Ben-Atar, who is two meters (7') tall, followed in his father's footsteps and began to play basketball. He studied at Tichon Hadash high school in Tel Aviv and joined Peace Now, taking part in left-wing demonstrations. In 1988, he worked for Israel's Meretz party. He went to the United States to study American history at Brandeis University and completed his doctorate at Columbia University in 1990. He taught at Yale University before moving to Fordham University.

Ben-Atar is married to an American Jew and has three children.

== Academic career ==
Ben-Atar is a noted expert on intellectual property piracy, "where he has "rocked the current patent debate by saying that piracy is not only inevitable, it may even be beneficial." He claims U.S. economic development was founded on the illegal misappropriation of intellectual property.

Business World India calls him "a genial giant from the world of academia" who has undermined conventional arguments in the hotly debated question of who owns intellectual property by looking at the issue through the prism of the past. Ben-Atar maintains that "it is impossible to contain the abuse of technology without undermining the free flow of knowledge that is the prerequisite for innovation." Christine MacLeod of Bristol University wrote "Doron S. Ben-Atar wears his heart on his sleeve. It's a good heart, but historically the wrong sleeve."

His work on intellectual policy builds on his earlier work on Thomas Jefferson. He criticized Jefferson for vacillating between viewing commerce as a threat to republican virtue and recognizing the necessity of promoting prosperity. As a result, Jefferson "failed to recognize America's larger stake in defeating Napoleonic France."

== Playwrighting career ==
After Behave Yourself Quietly, Ben-Atar wrote Peace Warriors about what he perceives as the demonization of Israel in the academic world. He says that writing plays is a way of grappling with the issue of Jewish identity and its significance in the 21st century.

== Published works ==
=== Books ===
- Trade Secrets: Intellectual Piracy and the Origins of American Industrial Power (Yale University Press, 2004)
- What Time and Sadness Spared: Mother and Son Confront the Holocaust together with Roma Nutkiewicz Ben-Atar (University of Virginia Press, 2006)
- The Origins of Jeffersonian Commercial Policy and Diplomacy (Macmillan, 1993)
- Federalists Reconsidered, co-edited with Barbara B. Oberg (University Press of Virginia, 1998)

=== Selected articles ===
- "Pirates of the Potomac," Legal Affairs (2004)
- "Pride, Ambition and Resentment: The American Revolution Revisited," for the Oxford History of the British Empire (2000)
- "The Jewish American Question," Journal of Urban History (1999)
- "Nationalism, Neo-Mercantilism, and Diplomacy: Rethinking the Franklin Mission," Diplomatic History (1998).
