= Anti-Zionism =

Opposition to Zionism

Anti-Zionism is opposition to Zionism. Although anti-Zionism is a heterogeneous phenomenon, all its proponents agree that the creation of the State of Israel in 1948, and the movement to create a sovereign Jewish state in the region of Palestine—a region partly coinciding with the biblical Land of Israel—was flawed or unjust in some way.

Before World War II, opposition to Zionism was common among Jewish communities. Secular critics viewed Zionism as a form of nationalism inconsistent with Enlightenment universalism, while some Orthodox groups opposed it on theological grounds, regarding the establishment of a Jewish state as contingent upon the arrival of the Messiah. (Note: "Though a little religious support for Zionism existed, 'the majority of Orthodox leaders condemned Zionism from its very outset,' particularly the rabbis of Eastern Europe. Their concerns were twofold: they feared that Zionists were overidealistic and were misleading the Jewish people about what was possible; they were also concerned that the Zionist millennial vision was an attempt to preempt the Messiah." (Brasher 2006, p. 70)) Support for Zionism increased during the 1930s as conditions for Jews rapidly deteriorated in Europe due to the rise of Adolf Hitler and Nazi Germany, and Zionism began to prevail over opposition to it in the Jewish diaspora. With the Second World War, the sheer scale of the Holocaust was felt, and support for Zionism increased dramatically.

After the establishment of the State of Israel in the 1948 Palestine war, anti-Zionism shifted from opposition to the creation of a Jewish state to opposition to Israel's existence, with many postwar movements advocating its replacement by an alternative political entity. Most Jewish anti-Zionist movements disintegrated or transformed into pro-Zionist organizations, though some, including the American Council for Judaism, continued to oppose the ideology. Outside the Jewish community, opposition to Zionism developed primarily among Arab populations, particularly Palestinians, after the mass displacement of Palestinian Arabs during the 1948 war (the Nakba), which many Palestinians and scholars consider a form of colonial dispossession.

Anti-Zionism comes in various forms. Some anti-Zionists seek to replace Israel and its occupied territories with a single state that would putatively give Jews and Palestinians equal rights. These anti-Zionists have argued that a binational state would still realize Jewish self-determination, as self-determination need not imply a separate state. Some challenge the legitimacy of the State of Israel. Some are anti-Zionist for religious reasons, such as some Haredi Jews, and others seek the oppression or ethnic cleansing of Israeli Jews instead. The relationship between anti-Zionism and antisemitism is debated, with some academics and organizations rejecting the linkage as unfounded and a form of weaponization of antisemitism used to stifle criticism of Israel and its policies, including the Israeli occupation of the West Bank and blockade of the Gaza Strip, while others, particularly supporters of Zionism, argue that anti-Zionism is inherently antisemitic or constitutes new antisemitism.

== Anti-Zionism before 1948 ==
=== Early Jewish anti-Zionism ===
==== In Europe ====
From the beginning, there was resistance to Zionism and Theodor Herzl's call for the establishment of a Jewish state in Palestine. Opposition came from diverse sources: many Orthodox rabbis held that a Jewish state before the messiah was against divine will; (Note: "in the language of the Hebrew prophets, the Return to the Land of the Fathers belonged to the end of history, to Aharit hayamim, to the coming of the Messiah and the establishment on earth of the Kingdom of God," (Wistrich 1996, p. 98)) assimilationist Jewish liberals feared Zionism threatened efforts at integration and citizenship in European states; and various left-wing Jewish movements, such as the Bund and Autonomists, promoted alternative forms of Jewish identity.

The Bund's position was strongly anti-Zionist from its inception; its modus operandi was based on the notion of doikayt ("hereness"), which affirmed that Jews should advance Jewish culture where they live rather than support what Bundists considered an antisemitic idea of Jews as strangers. Bundist opposition to Zionism was multifaceted; Vladimir Medem saw it as not only an unrealistic fantasy but also the equivalent of the bourgeois capitalist nationalism of the non-Jewish world and the antithesis of proletarian struggle.

In Western Europe, many established Jewish communities preferred loyalty to their nation-states to Jewish particularism. Some Reform rabbis removed references to Zion from liturgy, while others criticized Zionism as unrealistic. By contrast, the Mizrachi movement represented religious Zionist support, though more traditionalist groups like Agudat Yisrael opposed cooperation with secular Zionists. In the Soviet Union, the Yevsektsiya curtailed Zionist activity as part of its campaign against "Jewish bourgeois nationalism". (Note: The communist party nonetheless did create an autonomous Jewish oblast, Birobidzhan, in 1931 (Kolsky 2009, p. 335).)

==== Outside Europe ====
In regions outside Europe and North America, Zionism was often met with disinterest and regarded as a foreign ideology.

In Morocco, for example, it was met with skepticism by the local Sephardic populations, who regarded it as irreligious and not concerned with their interests. Later, some who were invested in the project of Westernization saw Zionism as an obstacle to achieving assimilation and integration with the Europeans; others saw Zionism as an obstacle to a favored Jewish-Muslim alliance and coexistence in Morocco. L'Union Marocaine, a francophone Jewish newspaper, spoke for the alliancistes associated with the Alliance Israélite Universelle, who saw Zionism as an obstacle to assimilation with the Europeans, and challenged L'Avenir Illustré, which published Zionist propaganda.

In Egypt in 1946, Jewish members of Iskra, an underground Communist movement, founded the Jewish Anti-Zionist League.

=== Early Ottoman, Arab, and Palestinian anti-Zionism ===
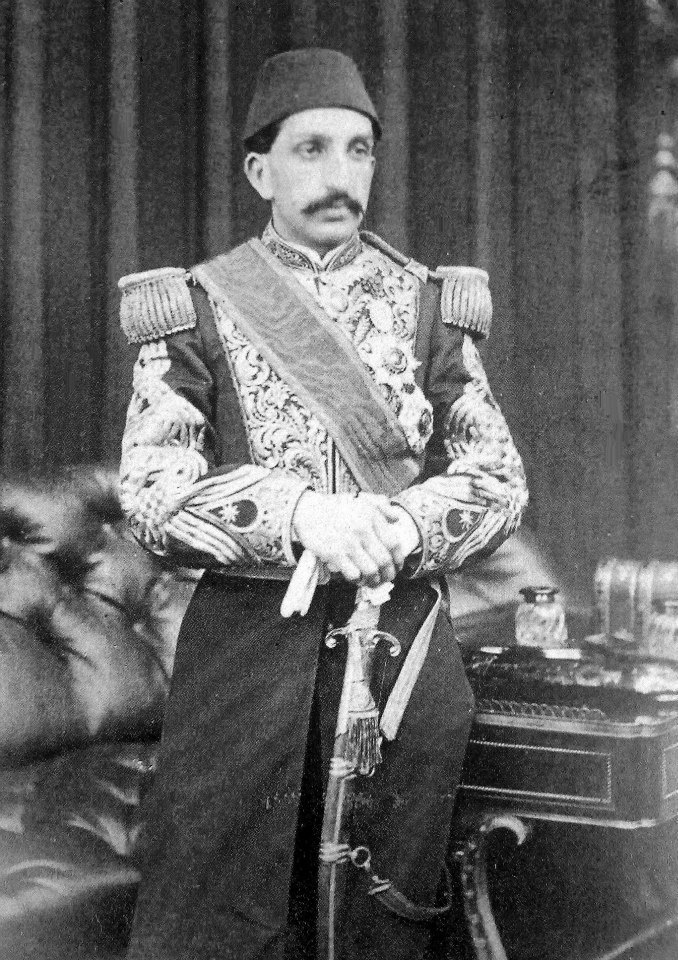
Sultan of the Ottoman Empire Abdul Hamid II firmly maintained his anti-Zionist position to secure Palestine until the Young Turk revolution

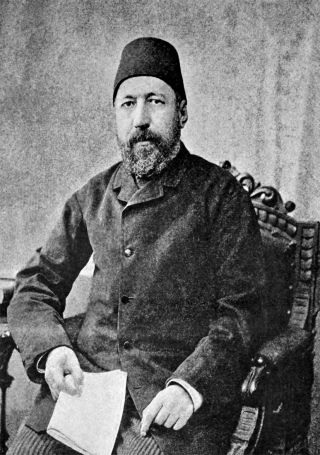
Arab mayor of Jerusalem Yousef al-Khalidi who in 1899 wrote a letter to Theodor Herzl arguing against Zionism, saying "in the name of God, let Palestine be left alone."

The Sultan of the Ottoman Empire, Abdul Hamid II, opposed Zionism because he believed in the integrity of the Ottoman Empire. In 1896, he told Zionist diplomatic agent Philip de Newlinski in Istanbul, that the land belonged to his people, who had defended it with their lives, and that he would not sell even a foot of it. (Note: "If Mr. Herzl is as much of a friend to you as you are to me [he said], then advise him not to take one further step in this matter. I cannot sell a single foot of this land; it does not belong to me but to my people. My people have won this empire with their blood.... We will again drench it with our blood before we let it be wrested from us.... The Turkish Empire belongs not to me, but to the Turkish people. Let the Jews save their billions. When my empire is carved up, they might even get Palestine for nothing. But only our corpse will be divided. I will not consent to a vivisection.")

Arabs began paying attention to Zionism in the Late Ottoman period. In 1899, compelled by a "holy duty of conscience", Yousef al-Khalidi, mayor of Jerusalem and a member of the Ottoman Parliament, wrote a letter to Zadok Kahn, the chief rabbi of France, to voice his concerns that Zionism, which he called a "natural, beautiful and just" idea, would jeopardize the friendly associations among Muslims, Christians and Jews in the Ottoman Empire. He wrote: "Who can deny the rights of the Jews to Palestine? My God, historically it is your country!" But Khalidi suggested that "geographically, [it had] no hope of realisation"; since Palestine was already inhabited, the Zionists should find another place for the implementation of their political goals: "in the name of God", he wrote, "let Palestine be left alone." (Note: 'Qui peut contester les droits des Juifs sur la Palestine ? Mon Dieu, historiquement, c'est bien votre pays ! Et quel spectacle merveilleux ça serait si les Juifs, si doués, étaient de nouveau reconstitués en une nation indépendante, respectée, heureuse, pouvant rendre à la pauvre humanité des services dans le domaine comme autrefois! Malheureusement, les destinées des nations ne sont point gouvernées seulement par ces conceptions abstraites, si pures, si nobles qu'elles puissent être. Il faut compter avec la réalité, avec les faits acquis, avec la force brutale des circonstances. Or la réalité est que la Palestine fait maintenant partie intégrale de l'Empire Ottoman et, ce qui est plus grave, elle est habitée par d'autres que des Israélites. Cette réalité, ces faits acquis, cette force brutale des circonstances ne laissent au zionisme [sic], géographiquement aucun espoir de réalisation, et ce qui est surtout important, menacent d'un vrai danger la situation des Juifs en Turquie. Certes, les Turcs et les Arabes sont généralement bien disposés envers vos coreligionnaires. Cependant, il y a parmi eux aussi des fanatiques, eux aussi, comme toutes les autres nations même les plus civilisées, ne sont pas exempts des sentiments de haine de race. En outre, il y a en Palestine des chrétiens fanatiques, surtout parmi les orthodoxes et les catholiques qui, considérant la Palestine comme devant appartenir à eux seulement, sont très jaloux des progrès des Juifs dans le pays de leurs ancêtres et ne laissent passer aucune occasion pour exciter la haine des musulmans contre les Juifs. Il faut donc, pour la tranquillité des Juifs en Turquie, que le mouvement sioniste, dans le sens géographique du mot, cesse. Que l'on cherche un endroit quelque part pour la malheureuse nation juive, rien de plus juste et équitable. Mon Dieu, la terre est assez vaste, il y a encore des pays inhabités où l'on pourrait placer des millions d'israélites pauvres, qui y deviendront peut-être heureux et un jour constitueraient une nation. Ça serait peut-être la meilleure, la plus rationnelle solution de la question juive. Mais, au nom de Dieu, qu'on laisse tranquille la Palestine.') According to Rashid Khalidi, Alexander Schölch, and Dominique Perrin, al-Khalidi was prescient in predicting that, regardless of Jewish historic rights, given the geopolitical context, Zionism could stir an awakening of Arab nationalism uniting Christians and Muslims. (Note: 'L'auteur de cette lettre admet qu'il peut exister un droit historique des Juifs à s'établir en Palestine. Mais il écarte immédiatement cette perspective au nom des réalités géographiques du moment. Et surtout il entrevoit que le sionisme peut contribuer à éveiller le nationalisme arabe local en réunissant dans une même opposition Chrétiens et Musulmans. La suite des événements confirme cette analyse.')

The Maronite Christian Naguib Azoury, in his 1905 The Awakening of the Arab Nation, warned that the "Jewish people" were engaged in a concerted drive to establish a country in the area they believed was their homeland. Subsequently, the Palestinian Christian-owned and highly influential newspaper Falastin was founded in 1911 in the then Arab-majority city of Jaffa and soon became the area's fiercest and most consistent critic of Zionism. It helped shape Palestinian identity and nationalism.

Palestinian and broader Arab anti-Zionism took a decisive turn, and became a serious force, with the November 1917 publication of the Balfour Declaration – which arguably emerged from an antisemitic milieu (Note: It has been argued that the document itself emerged from a milieu where antisemitic views were commonplace. In 1914, Chaim Weizmann reportedly told Arthur Balfour, "We too are in agreement with the cultural anti-Semites, in so far as we believed that Germans of the Mosaic faith are an undesirable, demoralizing phenomenon." Balfour had "introduced the Aliens Bill ... aimed specifically at restricting admission of Jewish immigrants from Eastern Europe. He warned Parliament at the time that the Jews 'remained a people apart.'") – in the face of strenuous resistance from two anti-Zionists, Lord Curzon and Edwin Montagu, then the (Jewish) Secretary of State for India. Other than assuring civil equality for all future Palestinians regardless of creed, it promised diaspora Jews territorial rights to Palestine, where, according to the 1914 Ottoman census of its citizens, 83% were Muslim, 11.2% Christian, and 5% Jewish. The majority Muslim and Christian population constituting 94% of the citizenry (Note: The Ottoman census of 1914 arrives as 722,000 resident citizens of Palestine: 83% Muslim (602,000), Christian 11.2 (81,000) and 5% Jewish (39,000) The British army's estimate for the last put the last figure at 65,000 by war's end (Krämer 2011, pp. 137–138).) only had their "religious rights" recognized.

Given that Arab notables were almost unanimous in repudiating Zionism, and incidents such as the Surafend massacre (perpetrated by Australian and New Zealand troops serving alongside the British) stirred deep resentment against Britain throughout the area, (Note: The massacre occurred on 10 December 1918 when Australian, New Zealand and Scottish soldiers attacked the village of Sarafand al-Amar, killing approximately 50 male villagers. It occurred in response to the murder of a New Zealand soldier by a Bedouin thief, though ultimately resulting from longstanding tensions between occupying Allied troops and local residents. Edmund Allenby was infuriated by the massacre, publicly condemning its perpetrators, but his attempts to pursue the matter were frustrated by resistance from his staff and other officials. (Laurens 1999, p. 480)) the British soon came to the conclusion, which they confided to the Americans during the King–Crane Commission, that the provisions for Zionism could only be implemented by military force. To this end, the British Army calculated that a garrison of at least 50,000 troops would be required to implement the Zionist project on Palestinian soil. According to Henry Laurens, uneasiness among British troops stationed in the region over the task of ostensibly supporting Zionism, something that clashed with their customary paternalistic treatment of colonial populations, accounted for much of the anti-Zionist sentiment that UK military personnel based in Palestine expressed.

=== Anti-Zionist reactions to the Balfour Declaration ===
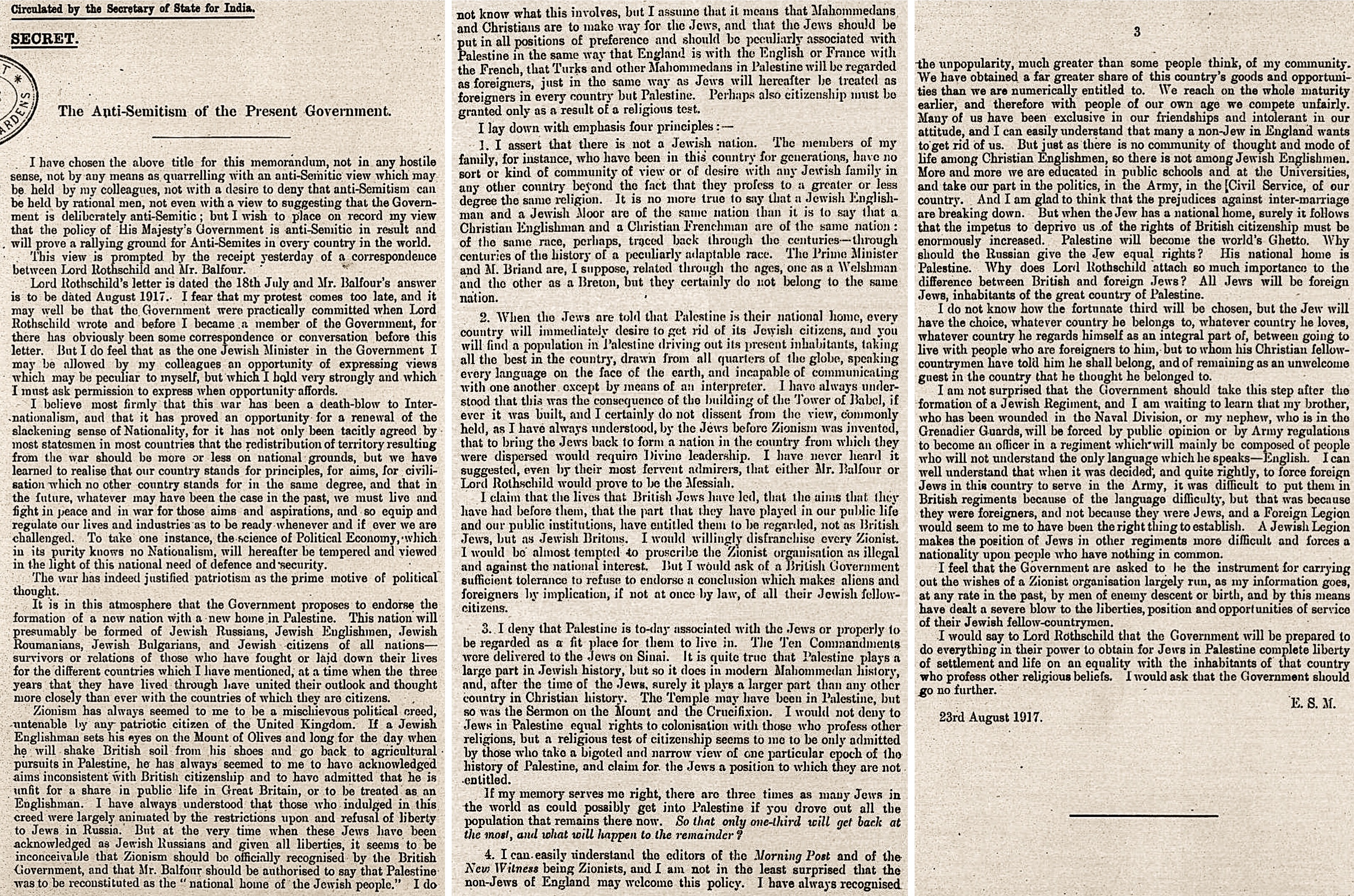
The August 1917 memorandum by Edwin Montagu, the only Jew then in a senior British government position, stating his opposition to the pro-Zionist Balfour Declaration, which he described as "antisemitic in result"

American approval of the Balfour Declaration came about through the secret mediation of the antisemitic anti-Zionist Colonel House with President Woodrow Wilson, bypassing Secretary of State Robert Lansing. Wilson's recognition alarmed many American Jewish leaders who viewed the U.S. as their "new Zion." At the Paris Peace Conference, 299 rabbis voiced opposition to the notion of a Jewish Palestine, and Lansing thought that Zionism contradicted Wilson's principle of self-determination. This moment helped establish an anti-Zionist tradition in the US State Department.

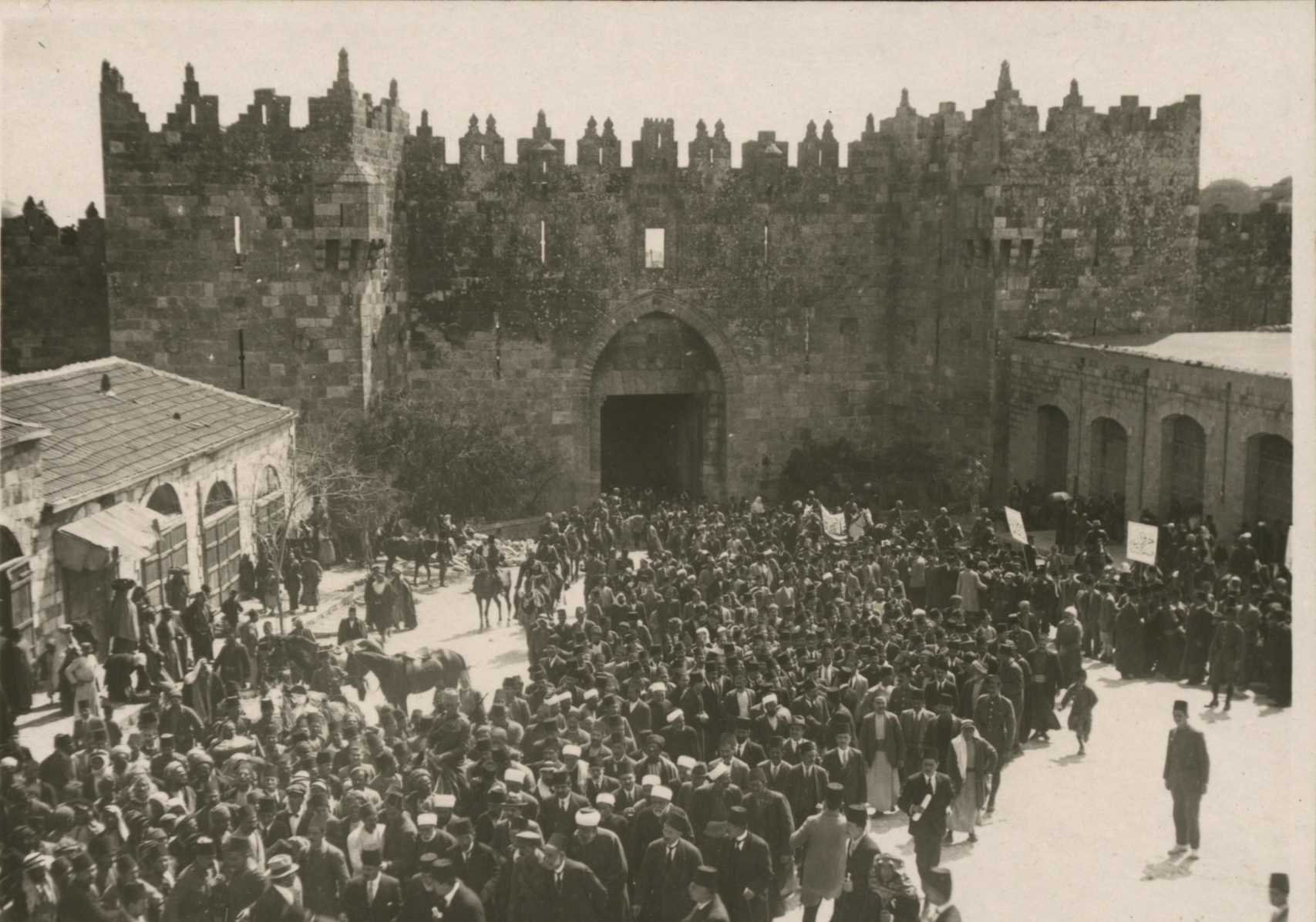
The first large-scale anti-Zionist demonstrations in Palestine, March 1920, during the Occupied Enemy Territory Administration. The crowd of Muslim and Christian Palestinians are shown outside Damascus Gate, Old City of Jerusalem.

Once the Occupied Enemy Territory Administration (OETA) began to implement the Declaration, both sides had reason to accuse the authorities of bias. Several contemporary sources credit the notion that English administrators were sympathetic to Arabs (Note: The British anti-Zionist John Hope Simpson believed that the Arabs were "economically powerless against such a strong movement" and thus needed protection. Charles Anderson writes that Hope Simpson was also "wary of the gulf between Zionist rhetoric and practice, observing that 'The most lofty sentiments are ventilated in public meetings and Zionist propaganda' but that the Jewish National Fund and other organs of the movement did not uphold or embody a vision of cooperation or mutual benefit with the Arabs.") and diffident about Jews. (Note: Among the latter, Archer Cust, Stewart Perowne, Ernest Richmond and the High Commissioner Sir John Chancellor are often mentioned. Many were uncomfortable at executing a mandate that would be detrimental and coercive for the Arab inhabitants. At the upper levels, many found Palestinian notables, with their francophile milieu, more urbane than tense Central-European Zionists. But at the same time British sympathies for the former were condescending and, privately, Arabs were often thought of generally as untrustworthy and given to chicanery.) One Zionist complaint was that several of the British Mandatory administration's higher functionaries tolerated anti-Zionist and even antisemitic policies. (Note: although a few senior British officials might well be considered anti-Zionist, pro-Arab, or even antisemitic, from the beginning of the British occupation until its bitter end in 1948, none of the top appointees of the mandatory administration outside the judiciary were Arabs (Khalidi 2006, p. 37).) Orthodox Jewish anti-Zionist figures such as Jacob Israël de Haan told the Mandate authorities that Zionists did not represent the entire Jewish community.

The 1920 Palin Commission investigation into the anti-Zionist riots at Nebi Musa found that there was a widespread perception among Arabs, reflected among British residents and officials, that Zionists are "arrogant, insolent and provocative". (Note: "Towards the Administration they adopted the attitude of 'We want the Jewish State and we won't wait', and they did not hesitate to avail themselves of every means open to them in this country and abroad to force; the hand of an Administration bound to respect the 'Status Quo' and to commit it, and thereby future Administrations, to a policy not contemplated in the Balfour Declaration.. It is not to be wondered at that the Arab population complained of bias on the part of the Administration in favour of the Jews. They see the Administration repeatedly overruled by the Zionist Commission; they see the Zionist Commission intermeddling in every department of Government, in Justice, Public Health, Legislation, Public Works, and forcing the Administration as in the case of the Wilhelma Concession to interfere in their favour, in a purely business transaction. They see Jews excluded from the operations of the Public Custodian with regard to enemy property: they have seen the introduction of the Hebrew language on an equality with Arabic and English: they have seen considerable immigration not effectively controlled: they see Zionist stamps on letters and Zionist young men drilling publicly in the open spaces of the town. Finally they have seen them proceeding to the election of a Constituent Assembly. What more natural than that they should fail to realise the immense difficulties the Administration was and is labouring under and come to the conclusion that the openly published demands of the Jews were to be granted and the guarantees in the Declaration were to become but a dead letter?." ( Palin 1920, pp. 34–35; Laurens 1999, p. 479))

In Britain itself, according to David Cesarani, the anti-Zionist movement emerged in 1921 with the arrival of a Palestinian Arab delegation.

The anti-Zionism of this period emanated almost wholly from the right wing of British politics, notably the so-called Die Hards of the Tory Party (the rump of Tory MPs who chose to stay outside the coalition government), and the mass-circulation right-wing press.

The British press was hightly critical of Zionism: the Northcliffe Press was openly anti-Zionist, Lord Beaverbrook opposed the Mandate, and complaints were made about the heavy burden of governing land with competing national interests. British anti-Zionism and antisemitism was also tinged with anti-communism, as Jews were accused of having played a major role in the Russian Revolution. (Note: "the Bolshevik Revolution and the Balfour Declaration were not unrelated events. Exaggerated British perceptions of the Jewish role in Bolshevism played a not insignificant part in fostering official support for Zionism. A propaganda campaign was waged to counteract the supposed communist tendencies of world Jewry by means of an appeal to Jewish nationalism. In the words of Winston Churchill, "Zionism versus Bolshevism: a struggle for the soul of the Jewish people." (Kadish 2013, p. 8)) Palestinians sought to discredit Zionism by associating it with communist infiltration, which the British took seriously.

=== Jewish anti-Zionism between the wars ===
The General Jewish Labour Bund in Poland promoted doykayt (hereness), and dismissed Zionism as "separatist, chauvinist, clerical and conservative". Many Jewish communal organizations in Germany and Italy advanced assimilationist anti-Zionism, emphasizing loyalty to their states.

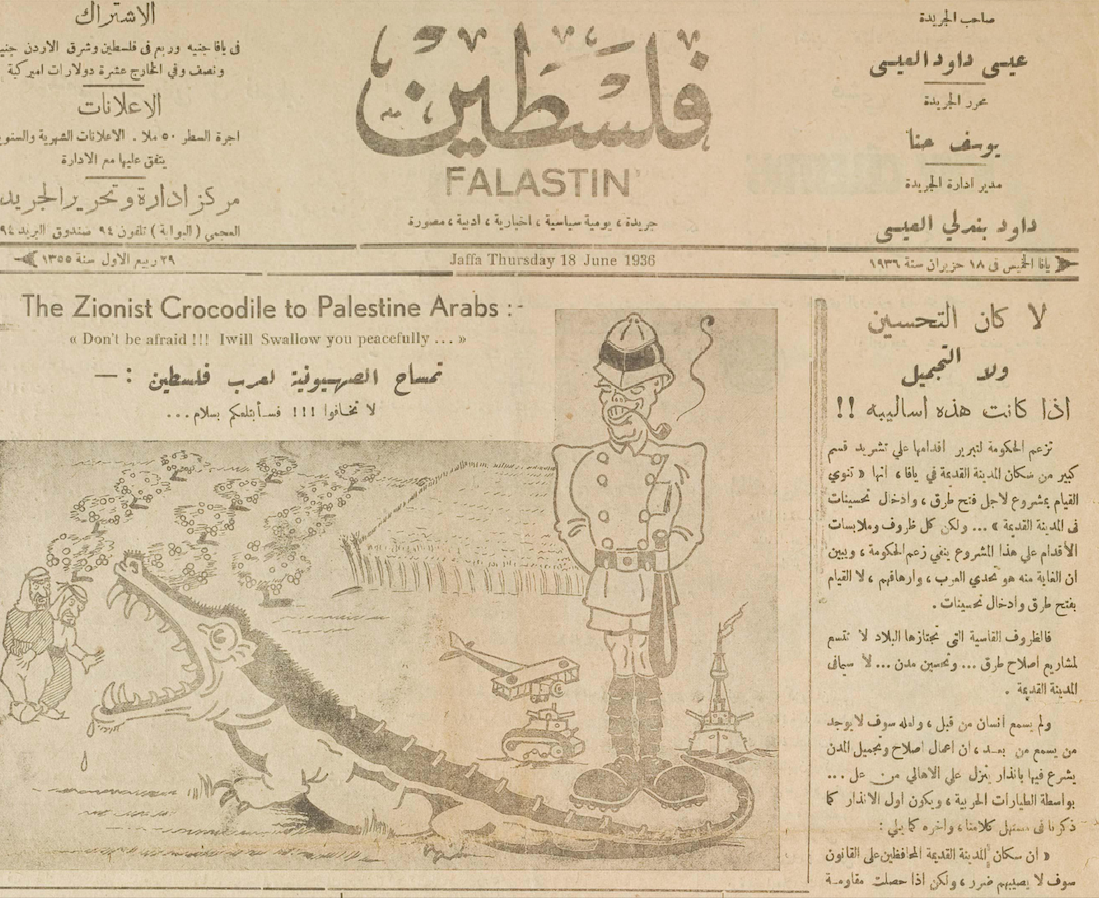
In an issue of the newspaper Falastin from June 1936, early in the Great Palestinian Revolt, an illustration depicts Zionism as a crocodile under the protection of a British officer with industrial military vehicles telling Palestinian Arabs: "don't be afraid!!! I will swallow you peacefully...".

Some leaders within Orthodox Judaism outside of the United States expressed opposition to political Zionism because the Zionist movement espoused nationalism in a secular fashion and used "Zion", "Jerusalem", "Land of Israel", "redemption", and "ingathering of exiles" as literal rather than sacred terms, endeavoring to achieve them in this world. According to Menachem Keren-Kratz, the situation in the United States differed, with "most Reform rabbis and laypeople repudiat[ing]" Zionism while most of the Orthodox supported it. Elaborating on the work of David N. Myers, Jewish historian Jonathan Judaken wrote in 2013 that "numerous Jewish traditions have insisted that preservation of what is most precious about Judaism and Jewishness 'demands' a principled anti-Zionism or post-Zionism." This tradition dwindled in the aftermath of the Holocaust and the establishment of the State of Israel, but Judaken saw it as still alive in religious groups such as Neturei Karta and among many intellectuals of Jewish background in Israel and the diaspora, such as George Steiner, Tony Judt, and Baruch Kimmerling.

=== Left-wing anti-Zionism between the wars ===
The official Soviet ideological position on Zionism condemned the movement as akin to bourgeois nationalism. Vladimir Lenin rejected Zionism as a reactionary movement, "bourgeois nationalism", "socially retrogressive", and a backward force that deprecates class divisions among Jews. In the 1930s and 1940s, the Communist Party USA (CPUSA) understood Zionism as a colonial project.

== Anti-Zionism after World War II and the creation of Israel ==
There was a shift in the meaning of anti-Zionism after the events of the 1940s. Whereas pre-1948 anti-Zionism was against the hypothetical establishment of a Jewish state in Palestine, post-1948 anti-Zionism had to contend with the existence of the State of Israel. This often meant taking a retaliatory position to the new reality of Jewish sovereignty in the Middle East. The overriding impulse of post-1948 anti-Zionism is to dismantle the current State of Israel and replace it with something else.

=== 1947–1948 ===
On the eve of the foundation of Israel in 1948, Judah Magnes, the president of Jerusalem's Hebrew University, opposed the imminent establishment of a Jewish state, advocating binationalism instead. According to Charles Glass, his opposition was grounded in the view—anticipated in the 1930s by Arthur Ruppin—that a non-binational state would automatically entail continuous warfare with the Arab world, an inference Glass says Moshe Dayan later endorsed.

=== The Soviet Union and the Eastern Bloc ===
By 1948, Jewish institutional life within the Soviet Union's borders had been effectively dismantled. (Note: "It would be a mistake to view the destruction of Jewish institutional life as a reflection of Soviet policy toward Israel. The contrary is true. Even as Soviet authorities were preparing the ground for liquidating Jewish communal structures, Moscow's relations with Israel were warm and cordial." (Korey 1972, p. 124)) The Soviet Union nonetheless played an initial role in recognizing the state of Israel, maintaining this policy before becoming antagonistic to Israel in 1950. The Soviet Union was harshly critical of Arab states opposing Israel during the 1948 Arab–Israeli War, and enabled Israel to procure substantial armaments in 1948–1949. But at roughly the same time, in early 1948, Ilya Ehrenburg had been co-opted to write an article for Pravda that set forth what later became the authoritative rationale for Soviet hostility to Zionism, as aspiring to create a dwarfish capitalist state, influenced by the "intrusion of Anglo-American capital".

Virulent antisemitism, particularly after the fabricated "doctors' plot" affair in 1953, and with clear parallels to The Protocols of the Elders of Zion, came to the fore, conflating anti-Zionism and antisemitism. (Note: "there can be no question that, though antisemitism and anti-Zionism are most definitively conceptually distinct, the campaigns against Israel undertaken by the Soviet Union, particularly after 1967, regularly made use not only of anti-Zionist argumentation but also of clearly antisemitic sentiments." (Jacobs 2022, p. 349)) A deep-seated antisemitic strain within Russian culture influencing the Soviet state's approach to events in the Middle East emerged to intensify the Soviet leadership's anti-Zionist hostility to Israel as a major threat to the communist world, (Note: Though the classical Marxist tradition berated antisemitism – in August Bebel's words "the socialism of fools" – treating it with dismissive contempt, a half-century after the Soviet Union had abolished the official antisemitism of the Tzarist empire, its political exploitation was avoided until the Great Purges of 1937, one collateral effect of which was to eliminate the "old guard" where the number of Jews was proportionally much higher than in the Party generally. After the Nazi-Soviet pact, Stalin ordered quotas limiting Jews in prominent positions, and anti-Jewish stereotypes and discrimination flourished (Korey 1972, pp. 116–117, 125, 132–133).) especially in the aftermath of the Six-Day War, when official documents and party connivance resuscitated antisemitic imagery related to Zionism. (Note: A widely circulated document in August 1967 stated that "A wide network of Zionist organizations with a common center, a common program, and funds exceeding by far the funds of the Mafia 'Cosa Nostra' is active behind the scenes of the international theater." The image of Zionism as an octopus with tentacles all over the world also later and to disarm critical challenges, it was asserted that Zionism itself was the major purveyor of antisemitism. Trofim Kichko, the antisemitic Ukrainian bigot who penned Judaism Without Embellishment, was rehabilitated, and allowed to write articles asserting Zionist bankers were using the Middle East as a "launching pad" to make strikes against socialism. Thereafter, the putative role of Zionist "saboteurs" was bruited about to "clarify" why, for example, the Soviet Union felt compelled to invade Czechoslovakia. Similar anti-Zionist tracts with antisemitic fantasies, such as lurii Ivanov's Осторожно: сионизм! (Beware: Zionism!), appeared at the same time. Ivan Shevtsov's antisemitic novel Любовь и ненависть (Love and Hate), was published in 1970, with a large print run, by the Soviet Ministry of Defence (Korey 1972, pp. 128–129, 131–132).) According to historian Åsmund Borgen Gjerde:

Within higher Soviet echelons, a particular logic existed that fostered a view of "Zionism" as an immense, conspiratorial threat to the Soviet Union. In one sense, this logic grew out of a more general tendency to view nonconformity as conspiracy: the Soviets had established extremely narrow boundaries for what constituted acceptable Jewish identity; and, when some Soviet Jews began to voice nationalist sentiments after the Six-Day War, Soviet leaders saw this expression of nonconformity as essentially a hostile act, warranting severe counter-measures.

In 1952, Czechoslovakia, which had been one of the most pro-Zionist of the Eastern Bloc states, launched an antisemitic show trial against 14 Jewish members of the Communist Party of Czechoslovakia (KSČ), including many high-ranking officials, known as the Slánský trial. Most of those targeted were ardent anti-Zionists, but they were accused of participating in a Zionist conspiracy against the Czechoslovak Socialist Republic. There were also anti-Zionist show trials in Hungary and Romania (such as that of Mișu Benvenisti) in the same period.

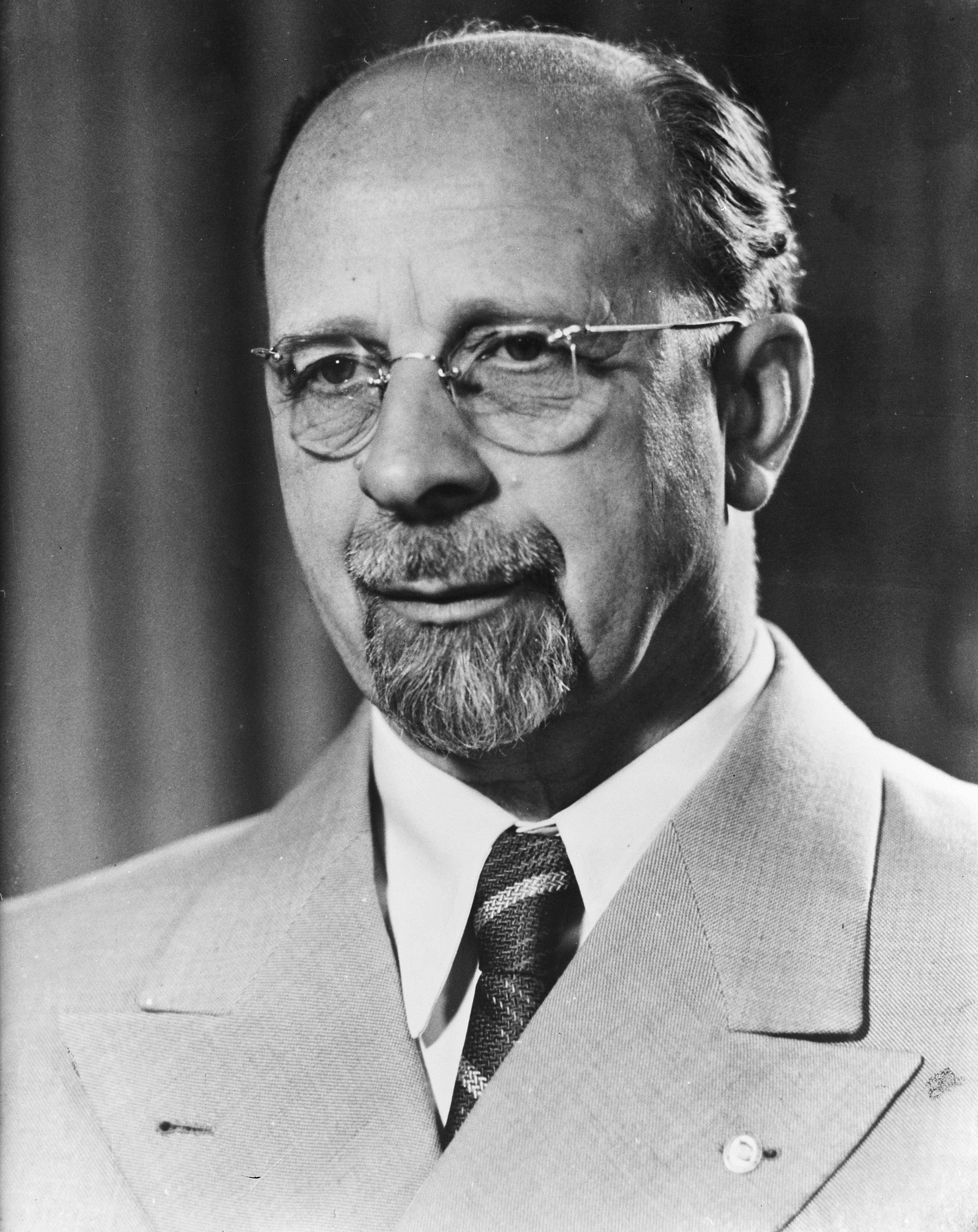
East German chairman Walter Ulbricht, 1960

East Germany's government was passionately anti-Zionist. From the 1950s through the 1970s, East Germany supplied Israel's neighboring Arab states with weapons. Immediately after the Six-Day War in 1967, East German Communist Party chairman Walter Ulbricht claimed that Israel had not been threatened by its neighboring Arab states before the war. He continually compared Israel to Nazi Germany.

In 1967–68, Poland's Stalinist ruling party, the Polish United Workers' Party, launched an "anti-Zionist campaign", purging Jews from public life on the grounds that they were "Zionists". At least 13,000 Poles of Jewish origin emigrated in 1968–1972 after being fired from their positions and various other forms of harassment. The armed forces were also purged in the name of "anti-Zionism".

Two waves of mass Russian-Jewish immigration to Israel, the Soviet Union aliyah and 1990s post-Soviet aliyah, took place from the 1970s onward. As late as 1983, the Anti-Zionist Committee of the Soviet Public was launched in the USSR to combat supposed Zionist propaganda. According to Anthony Julius, writing in 1989, "Soviet anti-Zionism was credibly considered the greatest threat to Israel and Jews generally... This 'anti-Zionism' survived the collapse of the Soviet system." In the 21st century, according to Izabella Tabarovsky, factions within American academia have supported boycotts of Israel using language that is Soviet in origin.

=== Arab and Palestinian anti-Zionism ===
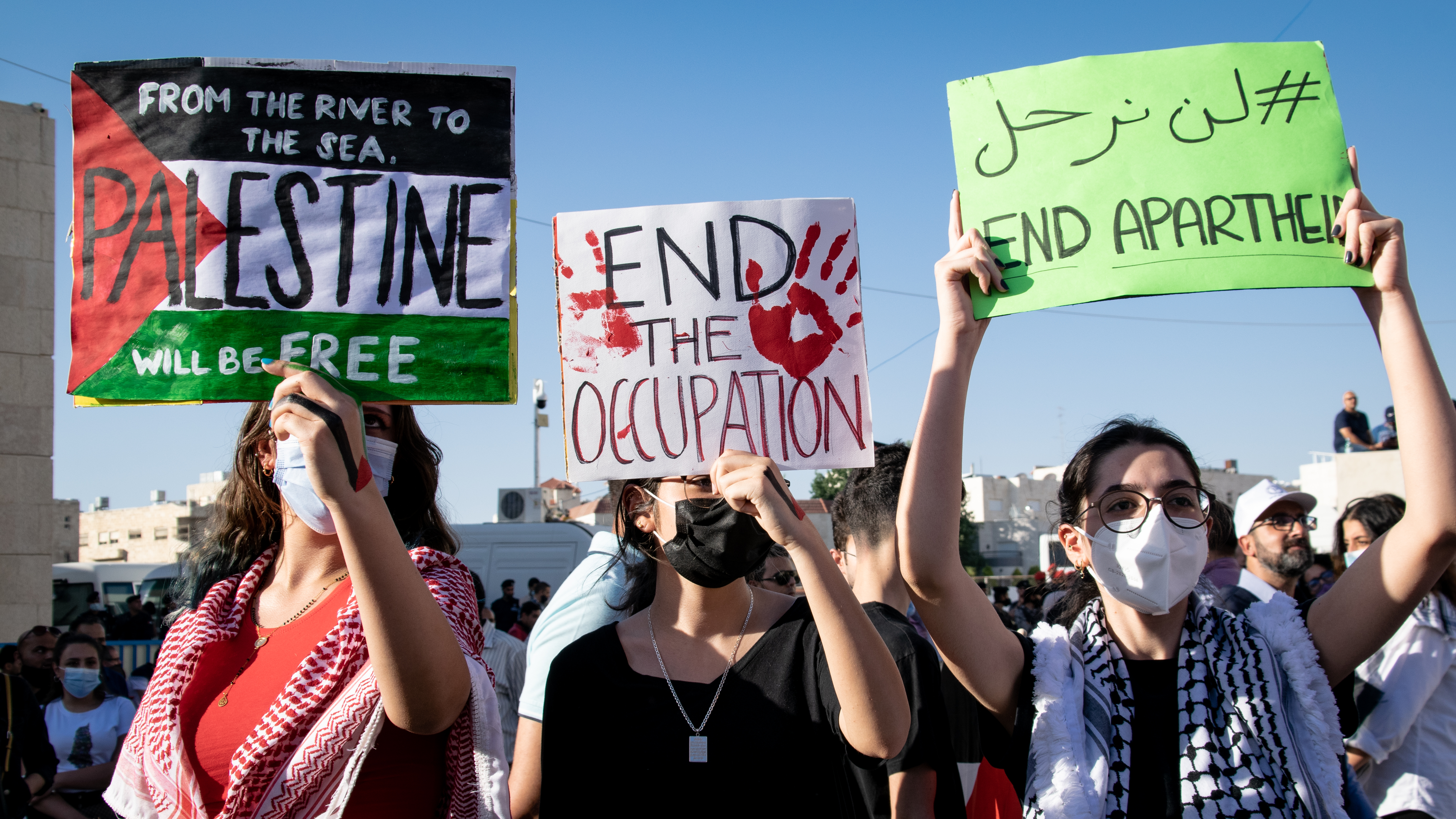
Arab women protestors holding pro-Palestinian signs in front of the Israeli embassy in Amman, 2021

In his 1979 essay "Zionism from the Standpoint of Its Victims", Edward Said wrote:

Zionism has hidden, or caused to disappear, the literal historical ground of its growth, its political cost to the native inhabitants of Palestine, and its militantly oppressive discriminations between Jews and non-Jews... Today the one issue that electrifies Israel as a society is the problem of the Palestinians, whose negation is the most consistent thread running through Zionism."

Said opposed Zionism and instead proposed that a binational Israeli-Palestinian state would grant Jews (as well as Palestinians) the right to self-determination.

In a retrospective analysis of Arab anti-Zionism in 1978, Yehoshafat Harkabi argued, in a view reflected in the works of the anti-Zionist Russian-Jewish orientalist Maxime Rodinson, (Note: "[he] asserted that antisemitism had not been a major problem in the Arabic-speaking lands before the creation of the State of Israel, and that it was precisely the establishment of the State that had led to a fanning of anti-Jewish attitudes among Arabs. From Rodinson's perspective, Israel was a colonial state." (Jacobs 2022, p. 351)) that Arab hostility to Zionism arose as a rational response in the historical context to a genuine threat, and, with the establishment of Israel, their anti-Zionism was shaped as much by Israeli policies and actions as by traditional antisemitic stereotypes, and only later degenerated into an irrational attitude. (Note: Derek Penslar summarized Harkabi's argument in his 2020 essay on the overlap of antisemitism and anti-Zionism: Arab attitudes towards Israel were shaped as much by specific Israeli policies and actions as by inherited, pervasive antisemitic stereotypes. For Harkabi, Arab anti-Zionism began as a rational response to a genuine threat but then mutated into irrational behaviour by governing elites. Or, to employ a medical metaphor – quite appropriate, since all forms of antisemitism are pathological-European antisemitism may be compared to a psychosomatic illness, whereas its Arab counterpart more closely resembles a toxic allergic reaction. The former originates in fantasy yet cripples the entire body politic; the latter is a debilitating, even fatal, response to a genuine substance.) Anthropologist of conflict Anne de Jong asserts that direct resistance to Zionism from the inhabitants of historical Palestine "focused less on religious arguments and was instead centered on countering the experience of colonial dispossession and opposing the Zionist enforcement of ethnic division of the indigenous population."

Until 1948, according to Derek Penslar, antisemitism in Palestine "grew directly out of the conflict with the Zionist movement and its gradual yet purposeful settlement of the country", rather than the European model vision of Jews as the cause of all of humankind's ills. According to Anthony Julius, anti-Zionism, a highly heterogeneous phenomenon, and Palestinian nationalism are separate ideologies; one need not have an opinion on the Israeli–Palestinian conflict to be an anti-Zionist.

One Arab criticism of Zionism is that Islamic–Jewish relations were entirely peaceful until Zionists conquered Arab lands. Arab delegates to the United Nations also claimed that Zionists had unethically enticed Arab Jews to come to Israel. According to Gil Troy, neither claim is historically accurate, as Jews did not have the same rights as Muslims in these lands and had periodically experienced violent riots.

According to Yousef Munayyer, "anti-Zionism, contrary to how many Zionists would like to mischaracterize it, does not necessitate a rejection of a Jewish connection to the land but rather of a Jewish claim to dominate and oppress non-Jews with a connection to the land."

=== "Zionism as racism" United Nations debate ===
In the 1960s and 1970s, Soviets and Americans interpreted the Arab–Israeli conflict as a proxy war between the Soviet–Arab alliance's totalitarianism and the Western world's democracies. Israel's victory in the Six-Day War of 1967 necessitated a diplomatic response by the Soviet–Arab alliance. The result was resolutions in the Organization of African Unity and the Non-Aligned Movement condemning Zionism and equating it with racism and apartheid during the early 1970s.

This culminated in November 1975 in the United Nations General Assembly's passage by a vote of 72 to 35 (with 32 abstentions) of UN General Assembly Resolution 3379, which declared, "Zionism is a form of racism, and racial discrimination". The passage elicited, in the words of American U.N. Ambassador Daniel Patrick Moynihan, "long mocking applause". U.N. representatives from Libya, Syria, and the PLO made speeches claiming that the resolution negated previous resolutions calling for land-for-peace agreements between Israel and its Arab neighbors. Israel's U.N. representative, Chaim Herzog, interpreted the resolution as an attack on Israel's legitimacy. African U.N. delegates from non-Arab countries also resented the resolution as a distraction from the fight against racism in places like South Africa and Rhodesia.

The decision was revoked on 16 December 1991, when the General Assembly passed UN General Assembly Resolution 4686, repealing Resolution 3379, by a vote of 111 to 25, with 13 abstentions and 17 delegations absent. Thirteen of the 19 Arab countries, including those engaged in negotiations with Israel, voted against the repeal, and another six were absent. All the ex-communist countries and most of the African countries that had supported Resolution 3379 voted to repeal it.

=== Islamic perspectives ===
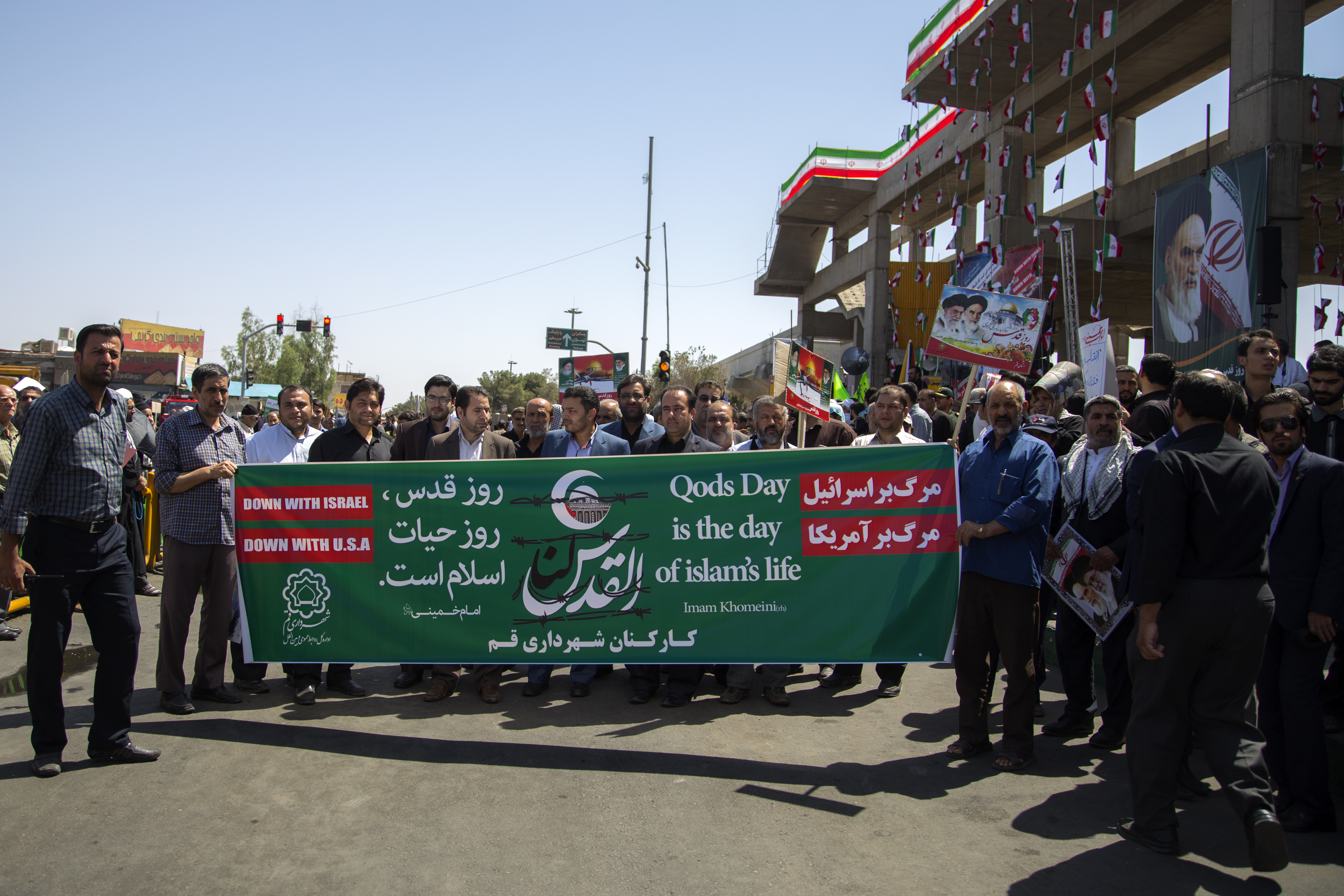
Quds Day demonstration in Qom, Iran

Some Muslims believe the 1948 Palestinian expulsions justify jihad against Israel. Some view the State of Israel as an intrusion into what Sharia defines as Dar al-Islam, a domain they believe should be ruled by Muslims, reflecting its historical conquest in the name of Islam.

In his 1980 book Islam and the Problem of Israel, Palestinian-American philosopher Ismail al-Faruqi argues that from an Islamic perspective Zionism is incompatible with Judaism and has failed to provide security or dignity for Jews. He contends that life in Israel is defined by conflict, militarization, and dependence on international powers, making the state the "greatest failure" of Zionism. Al-Faruqi calls for the dismantling of Zionism, suggesting that Israeli Jews who renounce it could live as an "ummatic community" within the Muslim world, following Jewish law under rabbinic courts within an Islamic framework.

ISIS claims that we are living in the Islamic end times and that Jews in Israel are allies of the Dajjal, the Muslim counterpart to the Christian Antichrist. In its view, Muslims must take over historic Palestine before the Dajjal can be defeated.

=== Left-wing politics ===
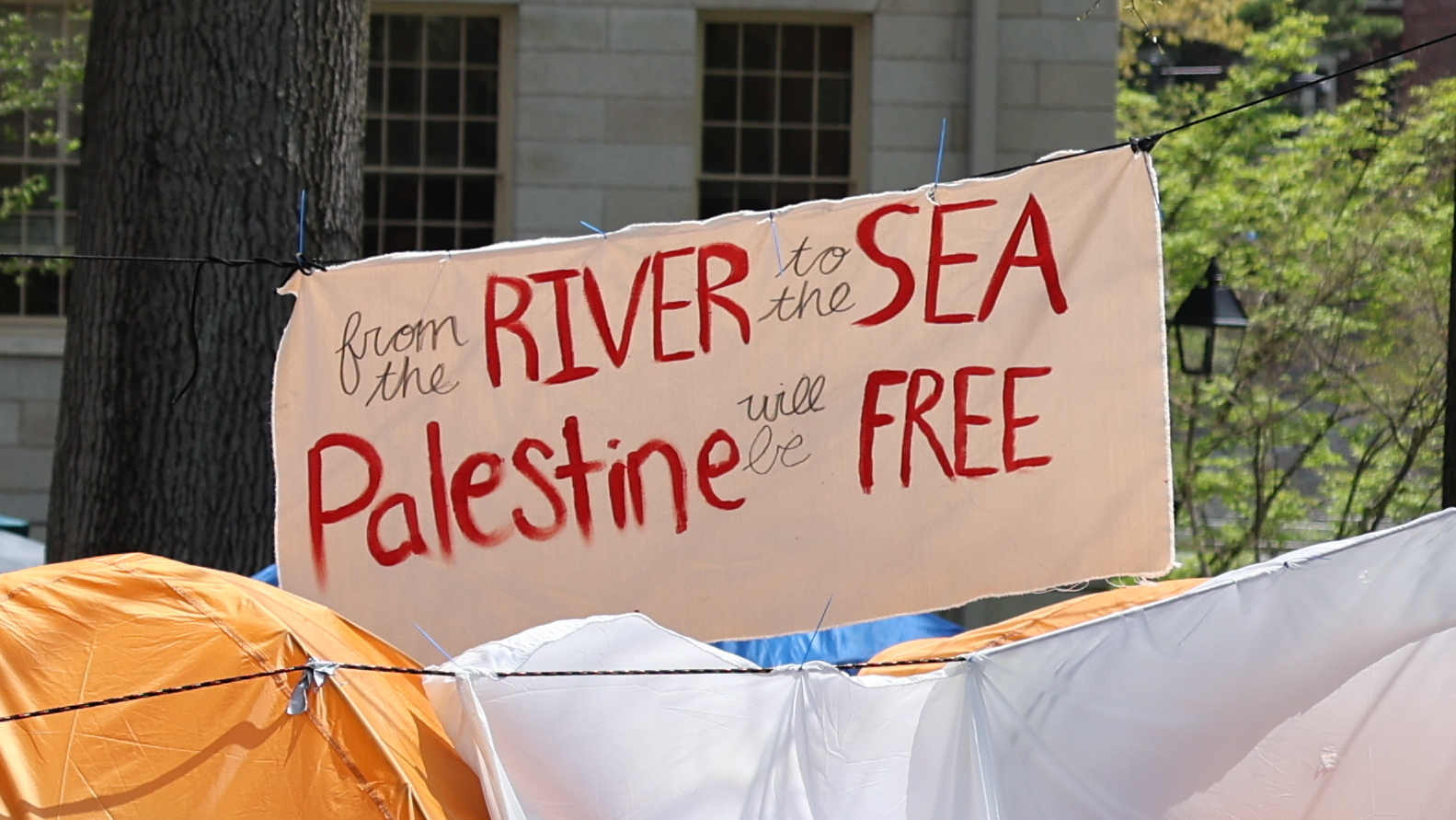
A banner with the text "from the river to the sea, Palestine will be free," displayed at an encampment in solidarity with Palestinians during the Gaza war and genocide at Harvard University, May 2024.

According to New York University social and cultural theorist Susie Linfield, one of the most pressing questions facing the New Left after World War II was "How can we maintain our traditional universalist values in light of the nationalist movements sweeping the formerly colonized world?" During the late 1960s, anti-Zionism became part of a collection of sentiments within far-left politics, including anti-colonialism, anti-capitalism, and anti-Americanism. (Note: "After the Six-Day War, the anti-Israel phenomenon became worldwide .... [T]he New Left immediately tagged Israel as an imperialist and ... fascist state. German New Left militants became enthusiastic proponents of—and, sometimes, participants in—Palestinian terror attacks. ... For much of the French New Left, Palestinians became the new Algerians." (Linfield 2019, p. 5)) In this environment, Zionism became a representation of Western power. Philosopher Jean Améry argued that this "Zionism" was merely a straw man redefinition of the term, used to mean world Jewry. The far-left Israeli politician Simha Flapan lamented in 1968, "The socialist world approved the 'Holy War' of the Arabs against Israel in the disguise of a struggle against imperialism. ... Having agreed to the devaluation of its own ideals, [it] was ready to enter an alliance with reactionary and chauvinist appeals to genocide."

The British historian James R. Vaughan traces the emergence of an anti-Zionist movement in Britain in the 1960s, involving the right-wing Labour Party MP Christopher Mayhew (the founder of the Labour Middle East Council) and Conservative allies in the Council for Arab-British Understanding, and growing in the 1970s with the newspaper Free Palestine, the Young Liberal 'Red Guard' faction, the Labour Herald newspaper, and Palestine Action (founded by Ghada Karmi in 1972):

In their press and publicity work, Mayhew, his allies in CAABU and LMEC, and their associates in groups like Palestine Action developed a campaigning language of anti-Zionism which proved to be both hugely influential and highly controversial.

This campaign language included the apartheid analogy, questioning Ashemazi Jewish origins in Israel, equating Zionism with Nazism, and claims of dual loyalty. Vaughan notes that this movement became more left-wing from the 1980s, when, as David Cesarani has suggested, "the mass-based left [in Britain] adopted anti-Zionism as a 'poster issue'".

In 1969, West German left-wing anti-Zionists placed a bomb in a Jewish Community Center. A series of anti-Zionist aircraft hijackings took place in the 1970s with left-wing groups' support. The most famous of these was the 1976 Air France hijacking perpetrated by the Popular Front for the Liberation of Palestine in coordination with the Revolutionary Cells. The hijackers released all the non-Jewish hostages without Israeli citizenship, but kept all the Israeli citizens (including those with dual citizenship) and Jewish people for ransom. The separation of Jewish non-Israelis and Israelis from non-Israelis, which, in essence, meant separating out the Jewish passengers generally, shocked many on the German left. To Joschka Fischer, the way the hijackers treated Jews reflected the violent, Nazi-like implications of anti-Zionism. A few years later, the Revolutionary Cells and another anti-Zionist group attempted to firebomb two German movie theaters that were showing a movie based on the hijacking.

Several advocacy groups that explicitly support Palestinian solidarity also oppose Zionism, viewing it as a form of colonialism. These include organizations from within the Jewish community, including Jewish Voice for Peace in the United States and Jews for Justice for Palestinians in the United Kingdom, as well as broader activist groups like Students for Justice in Palestine (SJP) and the International Solidarity Movement (ISM). Some secular Jews, particularly socialists and Marxists, continue to oppose the State of Israel on anti-imperialist and human rights grounds. Left-wing Jewish organizations that have opposed Zionism include NION in Canada and Jews Against Zionism in the UK. Some oppose it as a form of nationalism, which they argue is a product of capitalism. The First National Jewish Anti-Zionist Gathering in the US in 2010 and the International Jewish Anti-Zionist Network (IJAN) see anti-Zionism as an integral part of their anti-imperialism. IJAN describes itself as a socialist, antiwar, anti-imperialist organization, and calls for "the dismantling of Israeli apartheid, return of Palestinian refugees, and the ending of the Israeli colonization of historic Palestine".

In the 2000s, leaders of the Respect Party and the Socialist Workers Party of the United Kingdom met with leaders of Hamas and Hezbollah at the Cairo Anti-war Conference. (Note: "Consider ... the character of the connection between Muslim anti-Zionism and that version of the new anti-Zionism associated with the Far Left. ... [The Socialist Workers Party opted] for an opportunistic merging with Islamist groups, the stifling of criticism of their leaders, and the exploitation of communist politics (all of which eventually produced tensions within the party). ... SWP and Respect leaders [met] with Hamas and Hezbolah leaders at 'anti-war' conferences in Cairo in 2003 and 2007. The 2nd Cairo Declaration of 2003 ... identified 'the Zionist plan' as the 'establishment of the greater State of Israel from the Nile to Euphrates'; it condemned pressure on Arab nations to 'acknowledge the legitimacy of the racist Zionist entity; ... it opposed all 'normalization with the Zionist entity." (Julius 2010, p. 573)) The result of the 2003 conference was a call to oppose "normalization with the Zionist entity".

During the 2010s and 2020s, left-wing politics in Western countries saw a significant increase in anti-Zionist sentiment as it became a more mainstream position. This was partially driven by a shift from seeing the Israeli–Palestinian conflict as a conflict between states to seeing it as a struggle against settler colonialism and apartheid.

=== Right-wing anti-Zionism ===
Anti-Zionism has a long history of being supported by individuals and groups associated with Third Position, right-wing, and fascist (or "neo-fascist") political views. The "Old Right" founders of modern American conservativism were anti-Zionists:

As the historian David Austin Walsh notes in his 2024 book Taking Back America, the leader of the postwar far right (notably, the businessman Merwin K. Hart) became muted in their antisemitism but still believed in "limiting Jewish immigration to the United States" and advocated "anti-Zionism and opposition to the U.S. recognition of Israel. This was not rooted in any particular concern for the Arab population of Palestine but rather fear that the international Judeo-Bolshevik-Zionist conspiracy would embroil America in a war, weakening the U.S. and allowing for the victory of international Jewish communism." The fact that the Soviet Union supported Zionism further entrenched anti-Zionism on the anti-communist right.

Several militantly racist groups and their leaders are anti-Zionist, such as David Duke, the Ku Klux Klan, and various other Aryan / white-supremacist groups. In these instances, anti-Zionism is usually also deeply antisemitic, and often revolves around conspiracy theories discussed below.

=== Conspiracy theories ===
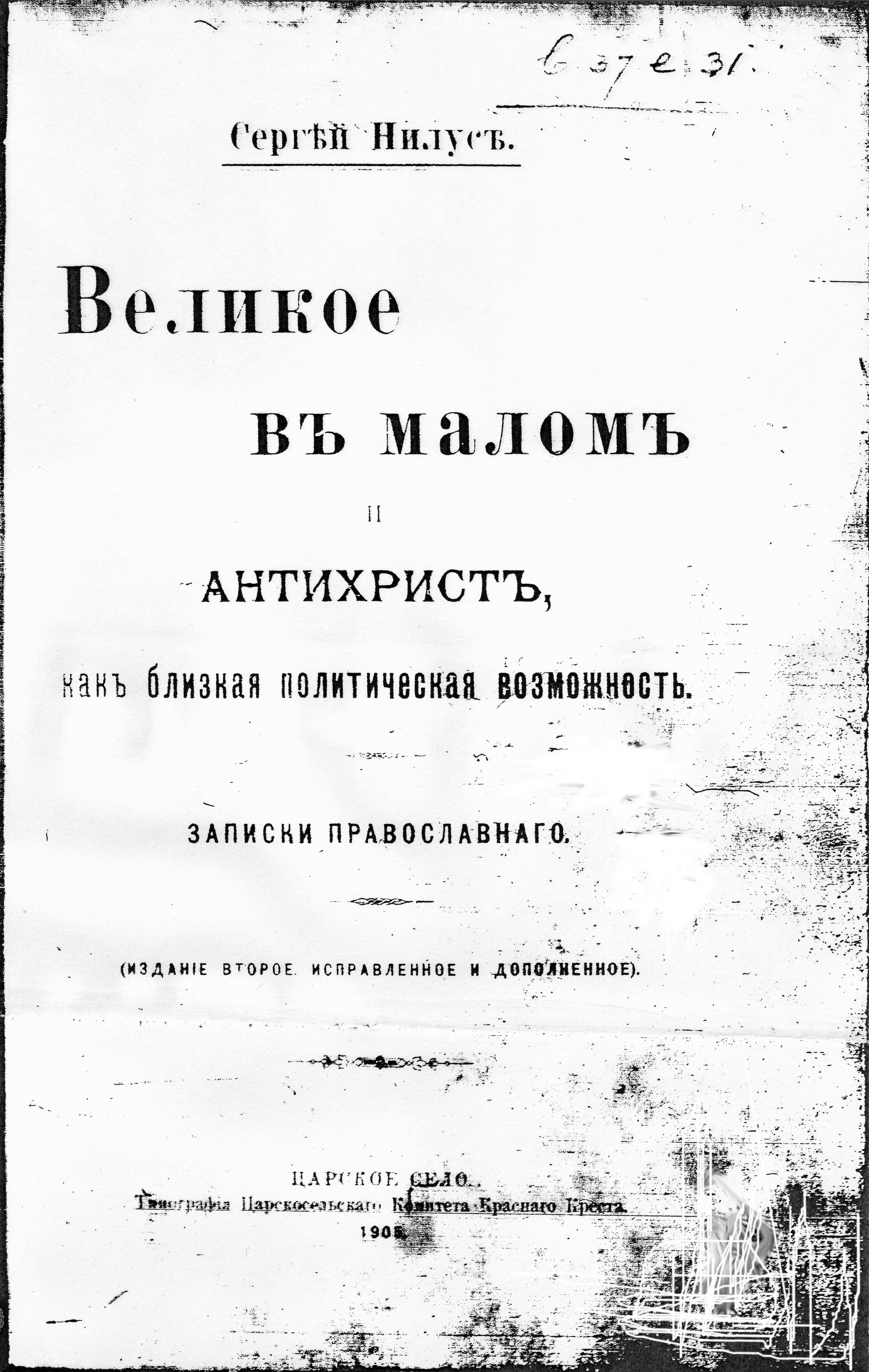
First edition of The Protocols of the Elders of Zion

The Protocols of the Elders of Zion came to be exploited by Arab anti-Zionists, although some have tried to discourage its usage. The Protocols itself makes no reference to Zionism, but after World War I, claims that the book is a record of the Zionist Congress became routine. The first Arabic translation of The Protocols was published in 1925, contemporaneous with a major wave of Jewish immigration to Palestine.

A similar conspiracy theory is the belief in a powerful, well-financed "Zionist lobby" that clamps down on criticism of Israel and conceals its crimes. (Note: New Statesman 11 February 2002 (Julius 2010, p. 484).) For example, some advocates of this theory claim Zionists are in "control of our media" and "suborned Britain's civil structures, including government, parliament, and the press." (Note: Michael Adams, Christopher Paget Mayhew, Publish it Not: The Middle East Cover-up, Signal Books (1975) 2006 ISBN 978 -1-904-95519-1 cited in Julius 2010, p. 489)

Anthony Julius argues that anti-Zionism is a major component of Holocaust denial. According to one strain of Holocaust denial, Zionists cooperated with the Nazis and are complicit in the crimes committed during the Holocaust. Deniers see Israel as having somehow benefited from what they call "the big lie" of the Holocaust. (Note: Richard Evans, Lying About Hitler 2001, p. 135, cited in Julius 2010, p. 65) Some deniers say their ideology is motivated by concern for Palestinian rights. (Note: "Some [Holocaust deniers] opportunistically propose that opposition to Zionism and a concern for Palestinian rights motivates their Holocaust denial." (Julius 2010, p. 65))

=== Christian anti-Zionism ===
Although there is major Christian support for Zionism, Christian anti-Zionism has appeared in both Protestant and Catholic contexts, with the Presbyterian Church (U.S.A.) criticizing Zionism in political terms and the Catholic Church opposing it on theological grounds.

=== Haredi Judaism ===
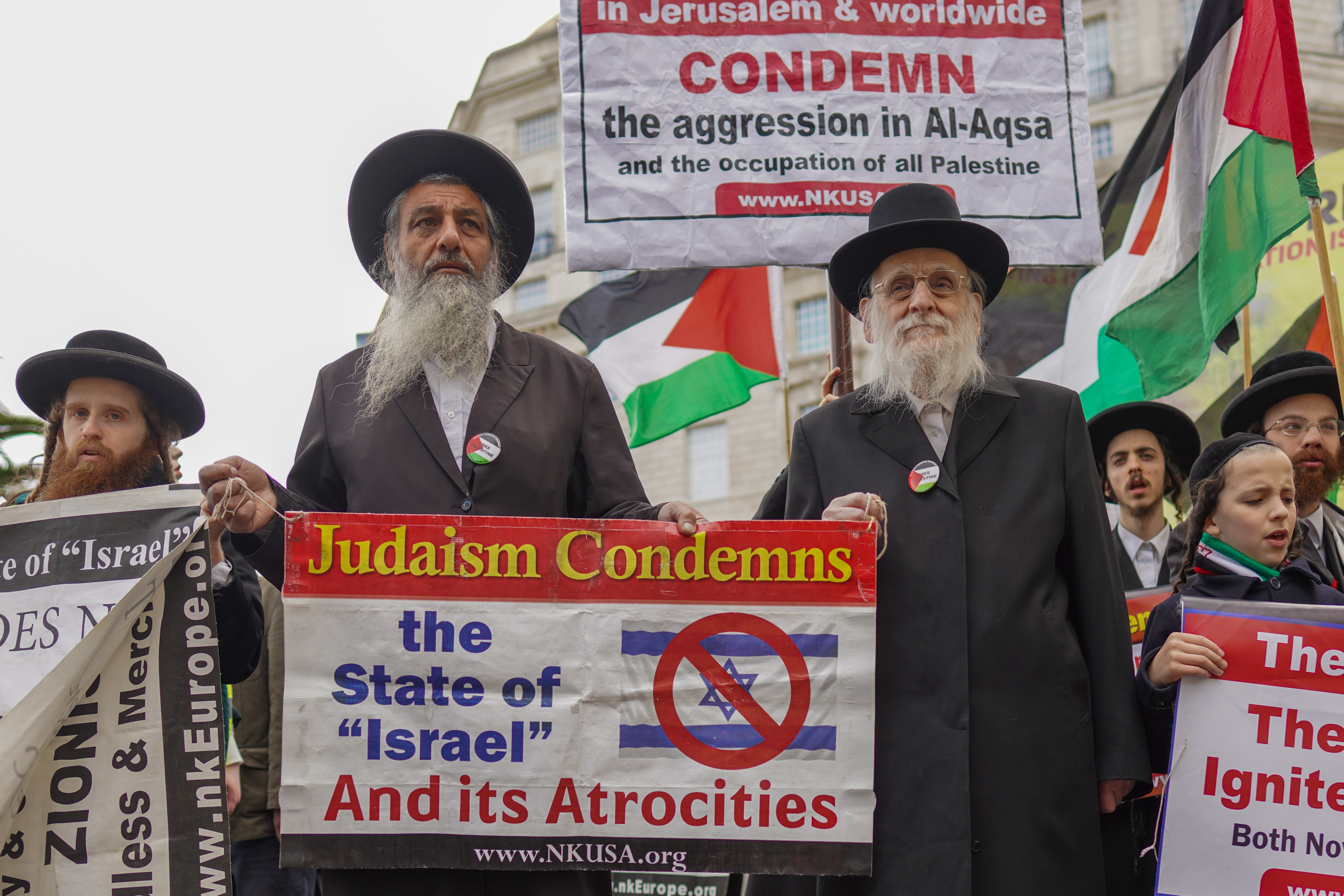
Members of Neturei Karta holding Palestinian flags and placards saying that "Judaism condemns the state of Israel and its atrocities" in London, 2022

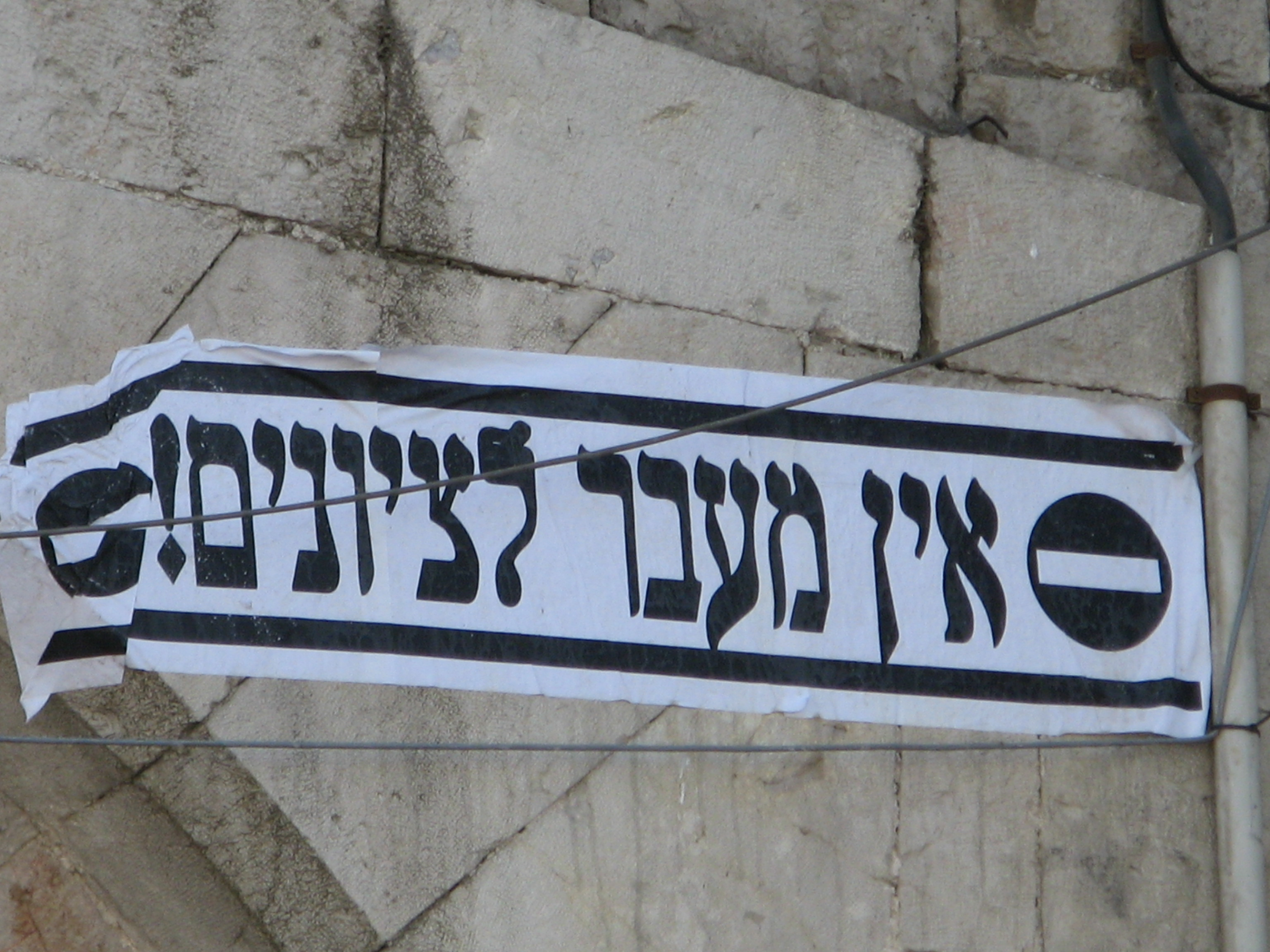
Flyer in the small neighbourhood of Meah Shearim that reads: "No entry to Zionists!"

Most Orthodox religious groups have accepted and actively support the State of Israel, even if they have not adopted "Zionist" ideology. Most religious Zionists hold pro-Israel views from a right-wing viewpoint. The main exceptions are Hasidic groups such as Satmar Hasidim and smaller Hasidic groups. Many Hasidic rabbis oppose the creation of a Jewish state.

Several Haredi groups not only oppose Zionism but also do not recognize the State of Israel. In July 1947, Rabbi Yosef Tzvi Dushinsky, Chief Rabbi of the Jerusalem-based Edah HaChareidis, declared to the United Nations his "definite opposition to a Jewish state in any part of Palestine".

Among the anti-Zionist sects are Shomer Emunim (and its offshoots, Toldos Aharon, and Toldos Avrohom Yitzchok), Mishkenos HoRoim, and Dushinsky. The largest anti-Zionist Hasidic group is Satmar, which has around 100,000 adherents worldwide (as of 2026). The group's position was crystallized by its leader, Rabbi Joel Teitelbaum, who authored comprehensive and polemic tracts detailing his opposition to Zionism. He encouraged his followers who live in Israel to form self-sufficient communities, rejecting social state benefits, and not to vote in Israeli elections. He instructed his people not to visit the Western Wall and other holy sites Israel captured in the 1967 war. In 1959, Teitelbaum published the book VaYoel Moshe, which expounds an Orthodox position for anti-Zionism based on a derivation of halacha from an aggadic passage in the Babylonian Talmud's tractate Ketubot 111a. (Note: "in order to protect traditional Judaism from the of his time, he, like Rabbi Schlesinger, relied on unconventional sources and elevated nonhalachic material to the status of halacha. Indeed, he based his entire anti-Zionist polemic on an aggadic passage in (of the Babylonian Talmud) that many earlier halachic authorities had neglected." (Kaplan 2004, p. 169))

One of the most extreme anti-Zionist Haredi sects is the Neturei Karta. Formed in 1938 as a breakaway from Agudath Israel, its 5,000 members are based mainly in Jerusalem and Beit Shemesh. Despite their shared opposition to Zionism, Satmar and other anti-Zionist Haredi groups often criticize the Neturei Karta and publicly distance themselves from it.

== Shifting positions on Zionism ==
Before World War II and the creation of the State of Israel, the debate between Zionists and anti-Zionists was largely an internal Jewish affair; the questions it sought to answer involved Jewish self-definition and the proper use of political power in the Jewish diaspora. After the Holocaust, the debate largely subsided in the Jewish community. Most prewar Jewish anti-Zionists died in the Holocaust, emigrated to Israel, or became disillusioned by the Soviet Union.

Meanwhile, individual Jews have changed their position on Zionism:

- Jacob Israël de Haan made aliyah to Palestine in 1919 as a convinced religious Zionist. Deeply troubled by Zionist attitudes toward Arabs, he began to champion Arab rights while also advocating on behalf of the Orthodox Ashkenazi Agudat Israel / Haredim communities, which maintained excellent relations with Arabs, and with which he felt more spiritually aligned. His effectiveness with the Mandatory authorities in protesting Zionist claims to represent all Jews while they ignored dissent from Jerusalem's anti-Zionist orthodox communities was resented. He was condemned by Zionists and assassinated by the Haganah in 1924.
- Isaac Deutscher decidedly opposed Zionism, then changed his mind after the Holocaust, supporting the foundation of Israel, even at the Palestinians' expense. (Note: He wrote in 1954, "People pursued by a monster and running to save their lives cannot help injuring those who are in their way and cannot help trampling over their property." (Caute 2013, p. 255)) He then wavered between contempt for Arab states' antisemitic demagoguery and odium for Israelis' fanatical triumphalism. In "Prussians of the Middle East", at the end of the Six-Day War, he wrote that the victory would prove to be a disaster for Israel.
- Noam Chomsky is often said to be an anti-Zionist. He has said that the word "Zionism" has changed connotations since his youth, with the boundaries of what are considered Zionist and anti-Zionist views shifting. The Zionist groups he led as a youth would now be called anti-Zionist because they mostly opposed the idea of a Jewish state. In 1947, in his youth, Chomsky's support for a socialist binational state, in conjunction with his opposition to any semblance of a theocratic system of governance in Israel, was considered well within the mainstream of secular Zionism; by 1987, it put him solidly in the anti-Zionist camp. (Note: "I was interested in socialist, binationalist options for Palestine, and in the kibbutzim and the whole cooperative labor system that had developed in the Jewish settlement there (the Yishuv).... The vague ideas I had at the time [1947] were to go to Palestine, perhaps to a kibbutz, to try to become involved in efforts at Arab-Jewish cooperation within a socialist framework, opposed to the deeply antidemocratic concept of a Jewish state." (Chomsky 1987, p. 7))

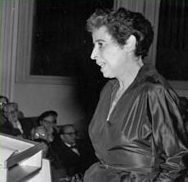
Hannah Arendt lecturing in Germany, 1955

Some criticism of Israel by Zionists has led other Zionists to mistake them for anti-Zionists. One can oppose the formation of a Jewish national state and yet not be anti-Zionist. This was the case with the political heirs of the cultural Zionism tradition founded by Ahad Ha'am, such as Brit Shalom and, later, Ihud. Hannah Arendt, who worked for the Jewish Agency for Palestine in the 1930s and was active in facilitating Jewish migration to Palestine from France, devoted much of her thinking in the 1940s to a critique of political Zionism. The Zionism she advocated had a broader definition: Jewish political agency anywhere. When partition was imminent, she came out strongly against the concept of a Jewish, as opposed to binational, state. While writing Eichmann in Jerusalem, she clarified her views: "I am not against Israel on principle, I am against certain important Israeli policies." Arendt took Israel's side in the Arab–Israeli conflict and rejoiced at its victory in the Six-Day War.

== Anti-Zionism and antisemitism ==
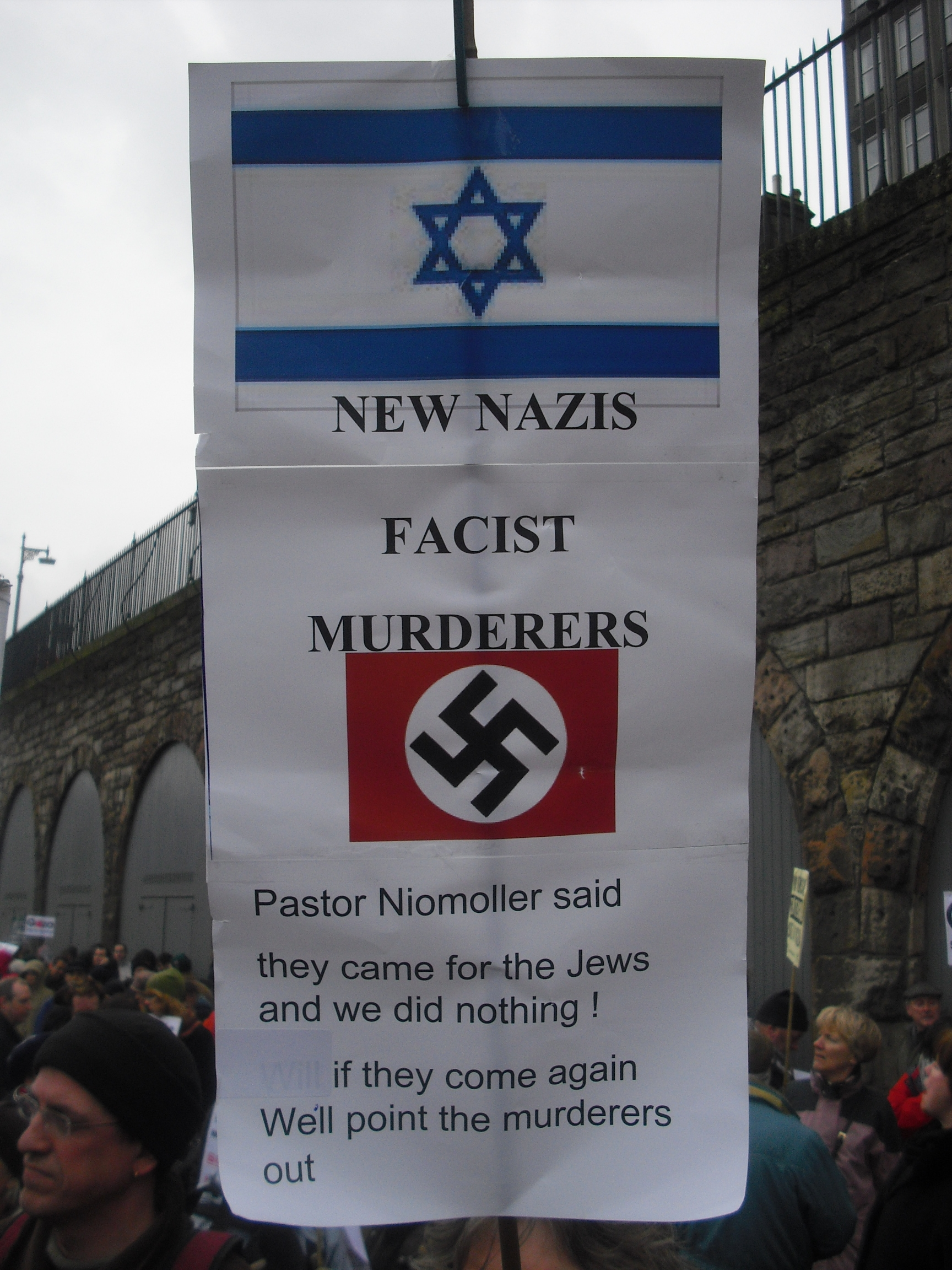
A sign held at a protest in Edinburgh, Scotland on January 10, 2009

Anti-Zionism spans a range of political, social, and religious views. Shany Mor, an Associate Fellow at the Hannah Arendt Center for Politics and Humanities at Bard College, argues anti-Zionism is not the same as either antisemitism or criticism of Israel but that these phenonena overlap. He identifies three "clusters" of anti-Zionism: an older Jewish anti-Zionism exemplified by the Bund, and not antisemitic; the anti-Zionism of the Arab and Muslim world, which rejects any sovereign Jewish presence in the Middle East; and a contemporary, Christian-inflected Zionism that sees Zionism as an absolute evil, which draws on antisemitism for its power.

According to Dov Waxman, there is:

an important difference in how many Jews and many Palestinians understand Zionism and anti-Zionism. Jews (for understandable reasons) tend to think of Zionism as a principle—namely, that Jews have a right to national self-determination in their ancestral homeland. Palestinians (for understandable reasons) tend to think of Zionism as a practice—how it has actually been implemented and what it has entailed for Palestinians. Many Jews, therefore, view anti-Zionism as a rejection of a Jewish right to self-determination, which they regard as discriminatory. Many Palestinians (& their allies), by contrast, view anti-Zionism as opposition to the historical and current practices of Zionism. They oppose Zionism not because it is a Jewish national movement, but because it has resulted in Palestinian dispossession and the denial of Palestinian rights. These different understandings shape the current debate over whether anti-Zionism is or is not antisemitic.

=== Views equating the concepts ===
Jean Améry became convinced that anti-Zionism was an updated version of the antisemitism he experienced as a Holocaust survivor. In a 1969 essay, he argues that the anti-Zionists of his time may not have ill intentions against all Jews, but their intentions are irrelevant. Their philosophy has a centuries-old pedigree beginning with the false charge of deicide and culminating in Nazi propaganda. Améry did not expect anti-Zionists of his time to take an unbending pro-Israel stance in the conflict between Israelis and Palestinians; he merely beseeched them to think critically, use common sense, and judge Israel fairly.

In 1973, Abba Eban wrote that one of the chief tasks of dialogue with the gentile world "is to prove that the distinction between anti-Semitism and anti-Zionism is not a distinction at all. Anti-Zionism is merely the new anti-Semitism." In 1975, he said: "Classical anti-Semitism denies the equal rights of Jews as citizens within society. Anti-Zionism denies the equal rights of the Jewish people to their lawful sovereignty within the community of nations. The common principle in the two cases is discrimination."

According to historian Ilan Pappé, after the 1967 Arab–Israeli War, the Anti-Defamation League (ADL)—with AIPAC founder Isaiah L. Kenen's support—sought to "portray certain 'anti-Israel' actions as anti-Semitic", especially with regard to international calls for Israel to end its occupation of the West Bank. In 1974, ADL leaders Arnold Forster and Benjamin Epstein published The New Anti-Semitism, which identified anti-Zionism as a "new antisemitism", an idea the ADL has sought to popularize since the early 1970s.

In the early 2000s, it became increasingly commonplace for Israel's defenders to regard criticism of Zionism and Israel as tantamount to, interchangeable with, or closely related to antisemitism. It was claimed that a "new antisemitism" had emerged that was rooted in anti-Zionism. Advocates of this notion argue that much of what purports to be criticism of Israel and Zionism is demonization, and has led to an international resurgence of attacks on Jews and Jewish symbols and an increased acceptance of antisemitic beliefs in public discourse. Critics of the concept argue that equating anti-Zionism with antisemitism is inaccurate, sometimes obscures valid criticism of Israel, and trivializes antisemitism.

In 2007, Tony Judt considered the merging of the two categories in polemics relatively new. Scholars who equate anti-Zionism and antisemitism in this period included Robert S. Wistrich, former head of the Vidal Sassoon International Center for the Study of Antisemitism at the Hebrew University of Jerusalem, who argues that since 1948, anti-Zionism and antisemitism have merged and that much contemporary anti-Zionism, particularly forms that compare Zionism and Jews with Hitler and Nazi Germany, has become a form of antisemitism. Scholars such as Dina Porat and Emanuele Ottolenghi have said that anti-Zionism is antisemitic because it denies Jews the right to national self-determination.

Professor Jeffrey Herf of the University of Maryland, College Park wrote: "One distinctive feature of the secular leftist antagonism to Israel... was its indignant assertion that it had absolutely nothing to do with antisemitism. Yet the eagerness with which Israel's enemies spread lies about Zionism's racist nature and were willing to compare the Jewish state to Nazi Germany suggested that an element of antisemitism was indeed at work in the international Left as it responded to Israel's victory in June 1967." Anti-Zionists responded to the war's outcome by describing Israel in terms familiar from antisemitic stereotypes.

The American Jewish Committee has said that denying Jews the right to a state is antisemitic, but also that it is not antisemitic for Palestinians to seek a single binational state. Anti-Defamation League director Jonathan Greenblatt told The New Yorker that denying Jews a state is discriminatory and therefore antisemitic, but when asked whether it is antisemitic for Palestinians to want a one-state solution, he said he was "not talking about that".

In December 2023, the US House of Representatives passed a resolution equating antisemitism with anti-Zionism. Palestinian rights advocates called the resolution a "dangerous" move aimed at limiting freedom of expression and diverting attention from the Gaza war.

French President Emmanuel Macron has said on multiple occasions that anti-Zionism is equivalent to antisemitism. He has opposed unilateral recognition of a Palestinian state and the Boycott, Divestment, and Sanctions campaign, while affirming France's responsibility for the Holocaust and commitment to combating antisemitism. Several other world leaders, including Stephen Harper, Manuel Valls, and Pope Francis, have described anti-Zionism in similar terms, framing it as an attack on Jews through the delegitimization of Israel. In 2026, the Canadian Federal Government adopted this view.

In an October 2026 interview, Nuseir Yassin, the Israeli-Palestinian media personality known as Nas Daily, said that "anti-Zionism is a form of antisemitism" and that while he was "not a fan" of the current Israeli government, he felt that unfavorable attitudes toward Israel and its government were "absolutely fueled by antisemitism" from people who "just really don't like Jews".

=== Views on conditional overlap ===
Kenneth Marcus says that in the 2000s analyses and definitions emerged of exactly when anti-Zionism is antisemitic, saying that four conditions are often identified:

(1) Using "classic anti-Semitic stereotypes" to characterize Israel, which may also include "demonization" of Israelis, similar to older characterizations of the Jewish people as the "embodiment of evil. (2) "Applying double standards[which may involve] requiring behavior of [Israel] not expected ... of any other" nations' or denying the Jewish people rights and legitimacy afforded other nations, including the right of self-determination." (3) "Drawing comparisons" between Israel and Nazi Germany. (4) "Holding Jews collectively responsible" for Israeli actions and policy, regardless of actual complicity.

For example, the 2003–04 European Monitoring Centre on Racism and Xenophobia (EUMC) report aroused intense controversy over aspects of its provisory definition of antisemitism, (Note: "we would conclude on the basis of our definition of antisemitism, that anti-Israeli or anti-Zionist attitudes and expressions are antisemitic in those cases where Israel is seen as a representative of 'the Jew'." (Marcus 2015, p. 153)) which many regarded as ambiguous in blurring distinctions to the point that the boundary between the two concepts became porous. The IHRA definition of antisemitism (originally developmed by the EUMC) was an attempt to clarify this line. Critics of the definition say it has been used to classify opposition to Zionism as antisemitism.

In 2010, Oxford University Press published Anthony Julius's book Trials of the Diaspora: A History of Anti-Semitism in England. In it, Julius claims that the borders between anti-Zionism and antisemitism are porous. He concedes that it is possible to be in conflict with a Jewish ideology without discriminating against Jews, but argues that anti-Zionists cross the line so often as to make the distinction meaningless.

The Jerusalem Declaration on Antisemitism, drafted in 2021 by more than 200 scholars of Jewish studies, uses an overlapping but different set of criteria for determining when anti-Zionism is antisemitic. For example, it says that supporting a one-state solution or denying Jews the right to a state is not inherently antisemitic: "It is not antisemitic to support arrangements that accord full equality to all inhabitants 'between the river and the sea,' whether in two states, a binational state, unitary democratic state, federal state, or in whatever form." Similarly, the JDA doesn't identify Nazi comparisons as inherently antisemitic, while IHRA does.

=== Views on distinctness ===
In 1978, Fred Halliday, arguing against the equation of anti-Zionism and antisemitism, wrote that disavowals were constantly required. (Note: "My own view would be that it is politically helpful to invoke the arguments of Marx, Lenin and the Comintern in a context where one is trying to establish the fundamental point that anti-Zionism is not equivalent to anti-Semitism. Elementary as this point may be, it is one that has to be re-established time and again." (Halliday 1978, pp. 166–167).)

Two empirical studies published in the 2010s, focused on the US and Germany respectively, which explored anti-Israel sentiment rather than "anti-Zionism", did not find a statistical correlation between criticism of Israeli policies and antisemitism:

- Political scientist Peter Beattie conducted the survey of US adults to test the purported link between criticism of Israel and antisemitism and found no necessary empirical correlation, cautioning that assertions of such an inherent connection are calumnious. He concludes, "Most of those critical of Israeli policies are not anti-Semites. Only a fraction of the US population harbours anti-Semitic views, and while logically this fraction would be overrepresented among critics of Israel, the present and prior research indicate that they comprise only a small part."
- The German sociologist Werner Bergmann's analysis of polling data from Germany concluded that whereas right-wing respondents critical of Israel tend to have views overlapping with classical antisemitism, left-wing interviewees' criticisms of Israel do not involve criticism of Jews. (Note: "Right-wing-oriented people are more likely to project a critical attitude towards Israel onto all Jews, and this view only reveals a significant correlation to classical anti-Semitic views here. It is interesting to note, unlike the sample as a whole and among right-wing respondents, that left-wing respondents do not show a significant correlation between criticism of Israel and the transfer of this critical view onto Jews in general. This suggests that such criticism, regardless of whether it is correct or not, is actually directed at the concrete policies of Israel and is not generalized or being used to form one's own antisemitism." (Bergmann 2010, pp. 110–111))

Peter Beinart argues that "barely anyone suggests that opposing a Kurdish or Catalan state makes you an anti-Kurdish or anti-Catalan bigot".

Former director of the Institute for Jewish Policy Research Antony Lerman argues:

The anti-Zionism equals antisemitism argument drains the word antisemitism of any useful meaning. For it means that to count as an antisemite, it is sufficient to hold any view ranging from criticism of the policies of the current Israeli government to denial that Israel has the right to exist as a state, without having to subscribe to any of those things which historians have traditionally regarded as making up an antisemitic worldview: hatred of Jews per se, belief in a worldwide Jewish conspiracy, belief that Jews generated communism and control capitalism, belief that Jews are racially inferior and so on. Moreover, while theoretically allowing that criticism of Israeli governments is legitimate, in practice, it virtually proscribes any such thing.

British sociologist David Hirsh coined the term "Livingstone Formulation" to refer to anti-Zionists claiming that actual antisemitism was merely "criticism of Israel", even when Israel was not mentioned.

== See also ==
- History of Zionism
- Calls for the destruction of Israel
- List of Jewish anti-Zionist organizations
- List of pro‑Palestinian advocacy organizations

== Sources ==
- Adler, Selig (October 1948). "The Palestine Question in the Wilson Era". Jewish Social Studies. 10 (4): 303–334. JSTOR 4615334.
- Khalidi, Rashid (2020). The Hundred Years' War on Palestine: A History of Settler Colonialism and Resistance, 1917–2017. Metropolitan Books. ISBN 978-1-627-79854-9.
- Perrin, Dominique (2020) [First published 2000]. Palestine: Une terre, deux peuples. Presses Universitaires du Septentrion. ISBN 978-2-757-42198-7.
- Scholch, Alexander (Summer 2005). "An Ottoman Bismarck from Jerusalem: Yusuf Diya' al-Khalidi (1842–1906)". Jerusalem Quarterly. 24 (24): 65–77. doi:10.70190/jq.I24.p65.
- Améry, Jean (2021). "The New Left's Approach to "Zionism" (1969)". In Gallner, Marlene (ed.). Essays on Antisemitism, Anti-Zionism, and the Left. Indiana University Press. pp. 41–45. ISBN 978-025305876-8.
- Anderson, Charles (2018). "The British Mandate and the crisis of Palestinian landlessness, 1929–1936". Middle Eastern Studies. 54 (2): 171–215. doi:10.1080/00263206.2017.1372427. S2CID 148906949.
- "Appel de 127 intellectuels juifs aux députés français: "Ne soutenez pas la proposition de résolution assimilant l'antisionisme à l'antisémitisme"" [Appeal from 127 Jewish intellectuals to French deputies: "Do not support the motion for a resolution equating anti-Zionism with antisemitism"]. Le Monde (in French). 2 December 2019.
- Arad, Yitzhak (2009). The Holocaust in the Soviet Union. University of Nebraska Press. ISBN 978-0-803-22270-0.
- Aronowitz, Stanley (Summer 2004). "Setting the Record Straight: Zionism from the Standpoint of its Jewish Critics". Logos. 3 (3).
- Balthaser, Benjamin (June 2020). "When Anti-Zionism Was Jewish: Racial Subjectivity and the Anti-Imperialist Literary Left from the Great Depression to the Cold War". American Quarterly. 72 (2): 449–470. doi:10.1353/aq.2020.0019. S2CID 226699923.
- Bar On, Bat-Ami (2002). The Subject of Violence: Arendtean Exercises in Understanding. Rowman & Littlefield. ISBN 978-0-847-69771-7.
- Beattie, Peter (8 December 2017). "Anti-Semitism and opposition to Israeli government policies: the roles of prejudice and information". Ethnic and Racial Studies. 40 (15): 2749–2767. doi:10.1080/01419870.2016.1260751. S2CID 217535131.
- Beinart, Peter (7 March 2019). "Debunking the myth that anti-Zionism is anti-Semitic". The Guardian.
- Benbassa, Esther (2001). The Jews of France: A History from Antiquity to the Present. Princeton University Press. ISBN 978-1-400-82314-7.
- Bergmann, Werner (2010). "Is there a 'New European Anti-Semitism?' Public Opinion and Comparative Empirical Research in Europe". In Rensmann, Lars; Schoeps, Julius H. (eds.). Politics and Resentment: Antisemitism and Counter-Cosmopolitanism in the European Union. Brill Publishers. pp. 83–115. ISBN 978-9-004-19047-4.
- Bernardini, Gene (September 1977). "The Origins and Development of Racial Anti-Semitism in Fascist Italy". Journal of Modern History. 49 (3): 431–453. doi:10.1086/241596. JSTOR 1878781. S2CID 143652167.
- Beška, Emanuel (2016). From Ambivalence to Hostility: The Arabic Newspaper Filasṭin and Zionism, 1911-1914. Bratislava: Slovak Academic Press. ISBN 978-8-089-60749-5 – via ResearchGate.
- Brasher, Brenda E. (2006). "Millennialism in Contemporary Israeli Politics". In Newport, Kenneth G. C.; Gribben, Crawford (eds.). Expecting the End: Millennialism in Social and Historical Context. Baylor University Press. pp. 67–78. ISBN 978-1-932-79238-6.
- Brenner, Lenni (1983). Zionism in the Age of the Dictators. Croom Helm. ISBN 978-0-882-08163-2.
- Caplan, Neil (2015). Palestine Jewry and the Arab Question, 1917-1925. Taylor & Francis. ISBN 978-1-317-44282-0.
- Caute, David (2013). Isaac and Isaiah: The Covert Punishment of a Cold War Heretic. Yale University Press. ISBN 978-0-300-19534-7.
- Chesler, Phyllis (2003). The New Antisemitism: The Current Crisis and What We Must Do About It. Jossey-Bass. pp. 158–159, 181. ISBN 978-078796851-9.
- Chomsky, Noam (1987). Peck, James (ed.). The Chomsky Reader. Pantheon Books. ISBN 978-0-394-75173-3.
- Chomsky, Noam (Spring 2012). Rabbani, Mouin (ed.). "Reflections on a lifetime of engagement with Zionism, the Palestinian Question and American Empire". Journal of Palestine Studies. XLI (3): 92–120. doi:10.1525/jps.2012.xli.3.92. JSTOR 10.1525/jps.2012.xli.3.92.
- Chomsky, Noam (2014) [First published 1999]. The Fatal Triangle (2nd ed.). Haymarket Books. ISBN 978-1-608-46399-2.
- Cohen, Naomi Wiener (2003). The Americanization of Zionism, 1897-1948. UPNE. ISBN 978-1-584-65346-2.
- Cohen, Patricia (31 January 2007). "Essay Linking Liberal Jews and Anti-Semitism Sparks a Furor". The New York Times.
- Cohen, Stuart A. (1987–1988). "Ideological components in Anglo-Jewish opposition to Zionism before and during the First World War: a restatement". Jewish Historical Studies. 30: 149–162. JSTOR 29779843.
- Dimont, Max I. (1978). The Jews in America: The Roots, History, and Destiny of American Jews. Simon & Schuster. ISBN 978-0-671-24267-1.
- Edelheit, Hershel (2019). History Of Zionism: A Handbook And Dictionary. Routledge. ISBN 978-0-429-72104-5.
- Endelman, Todd M. (1 January 2005). "Antisemitism in Western Europe Today". In Marrus, Michael Robert; Penslar, Derek Jonathan; Stein, Janice Gross (eds.). Contemporary Antisemitism: Canada and the World. University of Toronto Press. pp. 65–79. ISBN 978-0-8020-3931-6.
- Eshkoli-Wagman, Hava (February 1999). "Yishuv Zionism: Its Attitude to Nazism and the Third Reich Reconsidered". Modern Judaism. 19 (1): 21–40. doi:10.1093/mj/19.1.21. JSTOR 1396590.
- Friedberg, Maurice (November–December 1970). "The Plight of Soviet Jews". Problems of Communism. XIX: 17–26.
- Friedman, Isaiah (2011). British Pan-Arab Policy, 1915-1922. Transaction Publishers. ISBN 978-1-412-81514-7.
- Giebels, Ludy (2014). "Jacob Israel de Haan in Mandate Palestine: was the victim of the first Zionist political assassination a "Jewish Lawrence of Arabia"?". Jewish Historical Studies. 46: 107–129. JSTOR 43855720.
- Glass, Charles (1975–1976). "Jews against Zion: Israeli Jewish Anti-Zionism". Journal of Palestine Studies. 5 (1/2): 56–81. doi:10.2307/2535683. JSTOR 812535683.
- Greenblatt, Jonathan; Chotiner, Isaac (11 May 2022). "Is Anti-Zionism Anti-Semitism?". The New Yorker. New Yorker.
- Gribetz, Jonathan Marc (2015). "Reading Mendelssohn in Late Ottoman Palestine: An Islamic Theory of Jewish Secularism". In Joskowicz, Ari; Katz, Ethan B. (eds.). Secularism in Question: Jews and Judaism in Modern Times. University of Pennsylvania Press. pp. 48–64. ISBN 978-0-812-29151-3.
- Grill, Tobias (22 November 2021). "Jewish Anti-Zionist Movements". European History Online (EGO).
- Halliday, Fred (Winter 1978). "Early Communism in Palestine". Journal of Palestine Studies. 7 (2): 162–169. doi:10.2307/2536451. JSTOR 2536451.
- Halperin, Samuel (March 1961). "Zionist Counterpropaganda: The Case of the American Council for Judaism". The Southwestern Social Science Quarterly. 41 (4): 450–463. JSTOR 42866596.
- Herf, Jeffrey (Spring 2017). "1967: The Global Left and the Six-Day War". Fathom. BICOM.
- Hirsch, Daphna (September 2009). "Zionist Eugenics, Mixed Marriage, and the Creation of a 'New Jewish Type'". Journal of the Royal Anthropological Institute. 15 (3): 592–609. doi:10.1111/j.1467-9655.2009.01575.x. JSTOR 40541701.
- Ilany, Ofri (29 April 2008). "Hitler Makes Better Impression Than Expected". Haaretz.
- Jacobs, Jack (2022). "Marxism. Socialim and Antisemitism". In Katz, Steven T. (ed.). The Cambridge Companion to Antisemitism. Cambridge University Press. pp. 340–357. ISBN 978-1-108-49440-3.
- Jacobson, Eric (2013). "Why did Hannah Arendt Reject the Partition of Palestine?". Journal for Cultural Research. 17 (4): 358–381. doi:10.1080/14797585.2013.768472. S2CID 144384789.
- de Jong, Anne (3 May 2017). "Zionist hegemony, the settler-colonial conquest of Palestine and the problem with conflict: a critical genealogy of the notion of binary conflict". Settler Colonial Studies. 8 (3): 364–383. doi:10.1080/2201473X.2017.1321171.
- Judaken, Jonathan (2013). "So What News? Rethinking the 'new antisemitism' in a Global Age". In Judaken, Jonathan (ed.). Naming Race, Naming Racisms. Routledge. pp. 195–223. ISBN 978-1-317-99156-4.
- Julius, Anthony (2010). Trials of the Diaspora: A History of Anti-Semitism in England. Oxford University Press. ISBN 978-0-199-29705-4.
- Kadish, Sharman (2013). Bolsheviks and British Jews: The Anglo-Jewish Community, Britain and the Russian Revolution. Routledge. ISBN 978-1-134-72793-3.
- Kaplan, Edward H.; Small, Charles A. (August 2006). "Anti-Israel Sentiment Predicts Anti-Semitism in Europe". The Journal of Conflict Resolution. 50 (4): 548–561. doi:10.1177/0022002706289184. JSTOR 27638506. S2CID 144117610.
- Kaplan, Zvi Jonathan (May 2004). "Rabbi Joel Teitelbaum, Zionism, and Hungarian Ultra-Orthodoxy". Modern Judaism. 24 (2): 165–178. doi:10.1093/mj/kjh012. JSTOR 1396525.
- Keren-Kratz, Menachem (October 2017). "Rabbi Yoel Teitelbaum—the Satmar Rebbe—and the Rise of Anti-Zionism in American Orthodoxy". Contemporary Jewry. 37 (3): 457–479. doi:10.1007/s12397-017-9204-y. JSTOR 45209073. S2CID 152180880.
- Khalidi, Rashid (2006). The Iron Cage: The Story of the Palestinian Struggle for Statehood. Beacon Press. ISBN 978-0-807-00315-2.
- Klug, Brian (15 January 2004). "The myth of the new anti-Semitism: reflections on anti-Semitism, anti-Zionism and the importance of making distinctions". The Nation.
- Kolsky, Thomas (1992). Zionism: The American Council for Judaism, 1942-1948. Temple University Press. ISBN 978-1-566-39009-5.
- Kolsky, Thomas A. (2009). "Diaspora Anti-Zionism". In Ehrlich, M. Avrum (ed.). Encyclopedia of the Jewish Diaspora: Origins, Experiences, and Culture. Vol. 2. ABC-CLIO. pp. 333–339. ISBN 978-1-851-09873-6.
- Korey, William (March 1972). "The Origins and Development of Soviet Anti-Semitism: An Analysis". Slavic Review. 31 (1): 111–135. doi:10.2307/2494148. JSTOR 2494148. S2CID 155903928.
- Krämer, Gudrun (2011) [First published 2008]. A History of Palestine: From the Ottoman Conquest to the Founding of the State of Israel. Princeton University Press. ISBN 978-0-691-15007-9.
- Laqueur, Walter (1971). "Zionism and Its Liberal Critics, 1896-1948". Journal of Contemporary History. 6 (4): 161–182. doi:10.1177/002200947100600408. JSTOR 259691. S2CID 159961643.
- Laqueur, Walter (2003) [First published 1978]. A History of Zionism. Schocken Books. ISBN 978-0-805-21149-8.
- Laurens, Henry (1999). L'invention de la Terre sainte [The Invention of the Holy Land]. La Question de Palestine (in French). Vol. 1. Paris: Fayard. ISBN 978-2-84406-388-5.
- Lerman, Antony (12 September 2008). "Jews attacking Jews". Haaretz.
- Lerman, Antony (2022). Whatever Happened to Antisemitism?: Redefinition and the Myth of the 'Collective Jew'. Pluto Press. ISBN 978-0-745-33879-8.
- Liebreich, Freddy (2004). Britain's Naval and Political Reaction to the Illegal Immigration of Jews to Palestine, 1945-1949. Routledge. ISBN 978-1-135-76694-8.
- Linfield, Susie (2019). The Lions' Den: Zionism and the Left From Hannah Arendt to Noam Chomsky. Yale University Press. ISBN 978-0-300-25184-5.
- Lipstadt, Deborah E (2019). Antisemitism: Here and Now. Schocken Books. ISBN 978-0-8052-4337-6.
- MacShane, Denis (2008). Globalising Hatred: The New Antisemitism. Hachette UK. ISBN 978-0-297-85747-1.
- Marcus, Kenneth L. (2015). The Definition of Anti-Semitism. Oxford University Press. ISBN 978-0-199-37565-3.
- Mendes, Philip (2011). "American, Australian, and other Western Jewish Communists and Soviet Anti-Semitism: Responses to the Slansky Trial and the Doctors plot 1952–1953". American Communist History. 10 (2): 151–168. doi:10.1080/14743892.2011.597224. S2CID 159939552.
- Merkley, Paul Charles (2001). Christian Attitudes Towards the State of Israel. McGill-Queen's Press. ISBN 978-0-773-52188-9.
- Moser, Benjamin (2026). Anti-Zionism: A Jewish History. Knopf Doubleday Publishing Group.
- Myers, David N. (2006). "Can There Be a Principled Anti-Zionism ? On the Nexus between Anti-Historicism and Anti-Zionism in Modern Jewish Thought". Journal of Israeli History. 25 (1): 33–50. doi:10.1080/13531040500502957. S2CID 159655258.
- Nelson, Cary (22 June 2019). "The Presbyterian Church and Zionism Unsettled: Its Antecedents, and Its Antisemitic Legacy". Religions. 10 (396). MDPI: 396. doi:10.3390/rel10060396.
- Neusner, Jacob; Sonn, Tamara (1999). Comparing Religions Through Law: Judaism and Islam. Psychology Press. ISBN 978-0-415-19486-0.
- Ottolenghi, Emanuele (29 November 2003). "Anti-Zionism is anti-semitism". The Guardian.
- Palin, Philip Charles; Wildblood, Edward Harold; Edwards, Christopher Vaughan, eds. (August 1920). Report of the Court of Inquiry convened by Order of H.E. The High Commissioner and Commnander-in-Chief FO 371/5121 (Report). Palin Commission – via The National Archives of the United Kingdom.
- Penkower, Monty Noam (Spring 1985). "American Jewry and the Holocaust: From Biltmore to the American Jewish Conference". Jewish Social Studies. 47 (2): 95–114. JSTOR 4467289.
- Penslar, Derek J. (2006). "Anti-Semites on Zionism: From Indifference to Obsession". The Journal of Israeli History. 25 (1): 3–31. doi:10.1080/13531040500502981. S2CID 154174427.
- Penslar, Derek J. (2013). "Antisemites on Zionism: From Indifference to Obsession". In Herf, Jeffrey (ed.). Anti-Semitism and Anti-Zionism in Historical Perspective: Convergence and Divergence. Routledge. pp. 1–19. ISBN 978-1-317-98348-4.
- Penslar, Derek J. (2020). "Antisemitism and Anti-Zionism: A Historical Approach". In Penslar, Derek J.; Marrus, Michael R.; Stein, Janice Gross (eds.). Contemporary Antisemitism: Canada and the World. University of Toronto Press. pp. 80–95. ISBN 978-1-487-52624-5.
- Pfeffer, Anshel (3 May 2013). "Church of Scotland: Jews Do Not Have a Right to the Land of Israel". Haaretz.
- Piperno, Celeste Pavoncello (July–December 1982). ""La Nostra Bandiera": l'adesione agli "ideali" fascisti di un gruppo di ebrei italiani" ["La Nostra Bandiera": the adherence to the fascist "ideals" of a group of Italian Jews]. La Rassegna Mensile di Israel (in Italian). 48 (7/12): 15–22. JSTOR 41285264.
- Polkehn, Klaus (Spring–Summer 1976). "The Secret Contacts: Zionism and Nazi Germany, 1933-1941". Journal of Palestine Studies. 5 (3/4): 54–82. doi:10.2307/2536016. JSTOR 2536016.
- Porat, Dina (2022). "Anti-Zionism as Antisemitism". In Katz, Steven T. (ed.). The Cambridge Companion to Antisemitism. Cambridge University Press. pp. 448–464. ISBN 978-1-108-49440-3.
- "Presbyterians Reject Church Group's anti-Zionist Study Guide". Haaretz. Jewish Telegraphic Agency. 19 February 2014.
- Prince-Gibson, Eetta (15 July 2022). "Presbyterian Church vote declaring Israel an apartheid state upsets Jewish groups". The Washington Post.
- "Reactions to Hitlerism". Editorial. The Jewish Gazette. Belfast. June 1933. pp. 3–4 – via Queen's University Belfast – Digital Special Collections and Archive.
- Rhett, Maryanne A. (2015). The Global History of the Balfour Declaration: Declared Nation. Routledge. ISBN 978-1-317-31276-5.
- Rose, Norman (2014). 'A Senseless, Squalid War': Voices from Palestine; 1890s to 1948. Random House. ISBN 978-1-448-16333-5.
- Schneer, Jonathan (2010). The Balfour Declaration: The Origins of the Arab-Israeli Conflict. Random House. ISBN 978-1-400-06532-5 – via Internet Archive.
- Segré, Ivan (2013). "The Philo-Semitic Reaction: The Treason of the Intellectuals". In Badiou, Alain; Hazan, Eric; Segré, Ivan (eds.). Reflections On Anti-Semitism. Verso Books. pp. 45–231. ISBN 978-1-781-68115-2.
- Shapira, Anita (October 1995). "Anti-Semitism and Zionism". Modern Judaism. 15 (3): 215–232. doi:10.1093/mj/15.3.215. JSTOR 1396227.
- Shapira, Anita (2013). "Israeli Perceptions of Anti-Semitism and Anti-Zionism". In Herf, Jeffrey (ed.). Anti-Semitism and Anti-Zionism in Historical Perspective: Convergence and Divergence. Routledge. ISBN 978-1-317-98348-4.
- Shindler, Colin (2011). Israel and the European Left: Between Solidarity and Delegitimization. Bloomsbury Publishing USA. ISBN 978-1-441-13852-1.
- Sirhan, Nadia R. (2021). Reporting Palestine-Israel in British Newspapers: An Analysis of British Newspapers. Springer Nature. ISBN 978-3-030-17072-1.
- Slucki, David (Fall 2009). "The Bund Abroad in the Postwar Jewish World". Jewish Social Studies. 16 (1): 111–144. doi:10.2979/jss.2009.16.1.111. JSTOR 10.2979/jss.2009.16.1.111. S2CID 162240406.
- Solomon, Norman (1990). "The Christian Churches on Israel and the Jews". In Wistrich, Robert S. (ed.). Anti-Zionism and Antisemitism in the Contemporary World. Springer. pp. 141–154. ISBN 978-1-349-11262-3.
- Stillman, Norman A. (1987). "The Response of the Jews of the Arab World to Antisemitism in the Modern Era". In Reinharz, Jehudea (ed.). Living with Antisemitism: Modern Jewish Responses. University Press of New England. pp. 349–365. ISBN 978-0-874-51412-4.
- Sufian, Sandy (Winter 2008). "Anatomy of the 1936–39 Revolt: Images of the Body in Political Cartoons of Mandatory Palestine". Journal of Palestine Studies. 37 (2): 23–42. doi:10.1525/jps.2008.37.2.23. JSTOR 10.1525/jps.2008.37.2.23.
- Troy, Gil (Spring 2020). "When 'Oom' Became 'Shmoom': How the Most Enduring Hatred, Anti-Semitism, Became Infused with the Most Hated Hatred, Racism, to Israel's Dismay and to the UN's Detriment". Israel Studies. 25 (1): 47–42. doi:10.2979/israelstudies.25.1.03. S2CID 208688473.
- Urofsky, Melvin I. (2012). "Two Paths to Zion: Magnes and Stephen S. Wise". In Brinner, William M.; Rischin, Moses (eds.). Like All the Nations?: The Life and Legacy of Judah L. Magnes. State University of New York Press. ISBN 978-0-791-49753-1.
- Webman, Esther, ed. (2012). "Adoption of the Protocols in the Arab discouyrse on the Arab-Israeli conflict, Zionism, and the Jews". The Global Impact of the Protocols of the Elders of Zion: A Century-Old Myth. Routledge. pp. 175–195. ISBN 978-1-136-70610-3.
- Wistrich, Robert S. (Spring 1996). "Zionism and Its Religious Critics in fin-de-siècle Vienna". Jewish History. 10 (1): 93–111. doi:10.1007/BF01848255. JSTOR 20101253. S2CID 161514590.
- Wistrich, Robert S. (Winter 1998). "Zionism and Its Jewish "Assimilationist" Critics (1897-1948)". Jewish Social Studies. 4 (2): 59–111. doi:10.2979/JSS.1998.4.2.59. JSTOR 4467521.
- Wistrich, Robert S. (Fall 2004). "Anti-Zionism and Anti-Semitism". Jewish Political Studies Review. 16 (3/4): 27–31. JSTOR 25834602.
- Wistrich, Robert S. (2012). From Ambivalence to Betrayal: The Left, the Jews, and Israel. Studies in Antisemitism. University of Nebraska Press. ISBN 978-0-803240-834.
- Zipperstein, Steven J. (2005). "Historical Reflections on Contemporary Antisemitism". In Penslar, Derek J.; Marrus, Michael; Stein, Janice Gross (eds.). Contemporary antisemitism: Canada and the world. University of Toronto Press. pp. 52–63. ISBN 978-1-487-52624-5.
- Zur, Yaakov (1998). "German Jewish Orthodoxy's Attitude toward Zionism". In Almog, Shmuel; Reinharz, Jehuda; Shapira, Anita (eds.). Zionism and Religion. UPNE. pp. 107–115. ISBN 978-087451882-5.
- Öke, Mim Kemal (1982). "The Ottoman Empire, Zionism, and the Question of Palestine (1880-1908)". International Journal of Middle East Studies. 14 (3).
- Pawel, Ernst (1989). The labyrinth of exile : a life of Theodor Herzl. Farrar, Straus & Giroux. ISBN 0374182566 – via National Library of Australia.
