= Modern Judaism =

- Discipline: Religious studies
- Language: English

Publication details
- Publisher: Oxford University Press (United Kingdom)

Standard abbreviations
- ISO 4: Mod. Jud.

Indexing
- ISSN: 0276-1114 (print); 1086-3273 (web)

Links
- Journal homepage

Modern Judaism is a peer-reviewed academic journal of Jewish studies. It is published by Oxford University Press.

The editor is Professor Steven T. Katz of the Elie Wiesel Center for Judaic Studies at Boston University.
