= Jonathan Judaken =

Jonathan Judaken is a South African-born American intellectual historian. He serves as the Gloria M. Goldstein professor of Jewish history and thought at Washington University in St. Louis. Judaken previously taught as the Spence L. Wilson chair in humanities at Rhodes College and at the University of Memphis, where he was the Dunavant professor of history and director of the Marcus Orr Center for the Humanities. His fields of expertise include European cultural and intellectual history, discussions of Jews and Judaism, race and racism, and post-Holocaust French philosophy. Judaken is a notable scholar of Jean-Paul Sartre and Sartre's relationship to Jews and Judaism and race and racism, existentialism and critical theory as well as contemporary French Jewish philosophers. His recent scholarship has focused on rethinking the field of antisemitism studies.

== Scholarship ==
Judaken is the author of Jean-Paul Sartre and the Jewish Question: Anti-antisemitism and the Politics of the French Intellectual, in which he argues that "representations of Jews and Judaism as persistent figures of alterity serve as a fecund site to interrogate and reevaluate [Sartre's] oeuvre, especially his conception of the role of the intellectual." He is the editor of three volumes compiling scholarly contributions to the study of race and racism, existentialism, and the intersection between them: Race After Sartre: Antiracism, Africana Existentialism, Postcolonialism; Naming Race, Naming Racisms; and Situating Existentialism: Key Texts in Context, which provides a history of the systemization and canonization of existentialism as a philosophical movement. Judaken is also co-editor of The Albert Memmi Reader, the most comprehensive English-language anthology of Memmi’s work. His introduction to the book offers an intellectual biography that situates Memmi within anti-colonial thought, Jewish studies, and postcolonial theory.

Judaken has been credited with critically introducing “anti-antisemitism” into academic discourse, arguing that it can be politicized and instrumentalized. His scholarship, culminating in Critical Theories of Anti-Semitism, offers a critical rethinking of antisemitism studies by examining how antisemitism intersects with broader structures of racism and xenophobia. Judaken also discusses the definitional and conceptual challenges around antisemitism, questioning assumptions about the exceptionality and uniqueness of antisemitism. Judaken employs the term “Judeophobia” to decenter the conventional narrative of antisemitism as “the longest hatred” and reframe antisemitism as structurally entangled with Islamophobia, xenophobia, Negrophobia, and other systemic forms of discrimination. Judaken also devotes individual chapters to landmark thinkers whose approaches have defined the major set of explanatory frameworks for understanding antisemitism: Sartre, the Frankfurt School, Hannah Arendt, sociologists Talcott Parsons and Zygmunt Bauman, Jean-François Lyotard, and historians Léon Poliakov and George Mosse.

Judaken is critical of the concept of a "New anti-Semitism", arguing "there is not much empirical evidence to support the idea that a new alliance between Leftists and jihadists cemented together by anti-Zionism is emerging." Judaken has expressed support for the term "new Judeophobia", coined by Pierre-André Taguieff, as a better means of characterizing the recent upsurge of violence and hatred against Jews.

Judaken is U.S. consulting editor for the journal Patterns of Prejudice, on the editorial board for Jewish Historical Studies, associate editorial board for Critical Philosophy of Race, and has been a scholar in residence at the United States Holocaust Memorial Museum. As a Senior Fulbright specialist, Judaken visited Israel in the summer of 2011 at the invitation of Haifa University and Tel Aviv University and South Africa in the summer of 2013 at the invitation of University of Cape Town. Judaken is a founding member of the International Consortium for Research on Antisemitism and Racism (ICRAR), an organization of European, American, and Israeli scholars aimed at "revitalising and reshaping the study of antisemitism."

== Biography ==
Judaken was born in Johannesburg, South Africa on February 23, 1968. Judaken's youthful experience as a Jew living under South African apartheid, as a member of both a religious minority and the dominant racial group, helped to drive his career interest in subjects such as existentialism, racism and the so-called Jewish Question. After immigrating to the United States as a teenager, Judaken received a B.A. in philosophy from the University of California, San Diego and an M.A. and Ph.D. in history from the University of California, Irvine. After completing a post-doctoral fellowship at the Hebrew University of Jerusalem, Judaken joined the history faculty at the University of Memphis in 1999. He left the University of Memphis for Rhodes College in 2011, where he was appointed the first Spence L. Wilson Chair in Humanities. In his capacity as Spence L. Wilson Chair, Judaken directed the Communities in Conversation program, which facilitates interdisciplinary lectures and events for Rhodes students, faculty and the general public in Memphis. In 2019, Judaken was selected as a committee member for Rhodes College's new Jewish, Islamic, and Middle East Studies Program, which houses three different minors in Jewish Studies, Islamic and Middle East Studies: and Jewish, Islamic and Middle East Studies. Judaken hosted the educational interview program Counterpoint on WKNO-FM, the NPR affiliate station for the Mid-South from 2011 to 2019. Judaken began teaching at Washington University in St. Louis in 2023.
