= Melvin I. Urofsky =

American historian

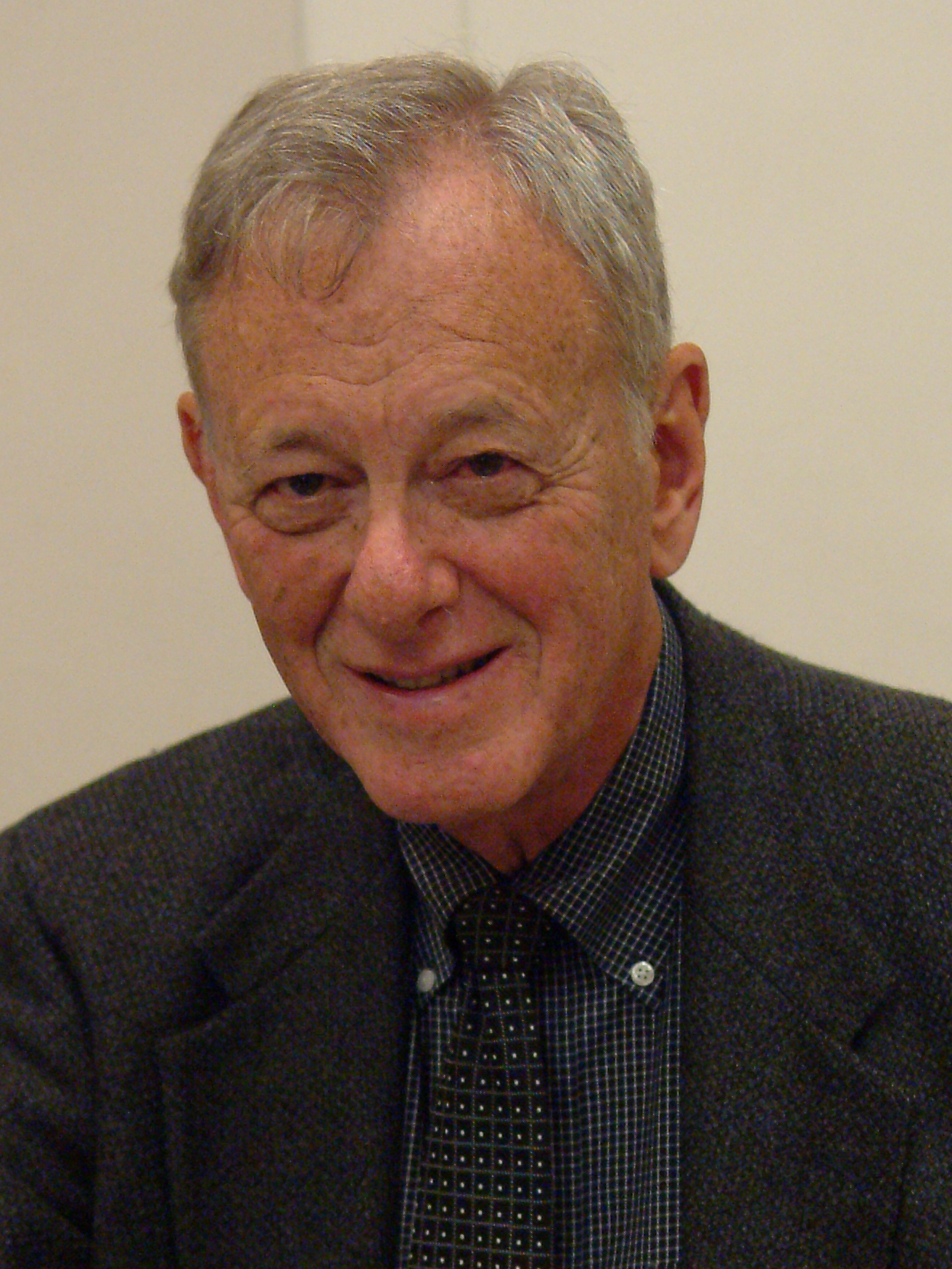
- Urofsky in 2009

Academic background
- Education: Columbia University (BA, PhD); University of Virginia (JD)

Academic work
- Discipline: Legal history
- Institutions: Virginia Commonwealth University; American University; George Washington University

Melvin I. Urofsky is an American historian, and professor emeritus at Virginia Commonwealth University.

He received his B.A. from Columbia University in 1961 and doctorate in 1968. He also received his JD from the University of Virginia. He teaches at American University and George Washington University Law School.

== Works ==
- Big Steel and the Wilson Administration: A Study in Business-Government Relations, Columbus, Ohio: Ohio University Press, 1969. OCLC 1131951106
- A Mind of One Piece: Brandeis and American Reform, New York: Scribner, 1971. ISBN 9780684123684
- We Are One!: American Jewry and Israel, Garden City, New York: Anchor Press, 1978. ISBN 9780385075800
- The Supreme Court Justices: A Biographical Dictionary, London: Routledge, 1994. ISBN 9780815311768
- American Zionism from Herzl to the Holocaust, Lincoln: University of Nebraska Press, 1995. ISBN 9780803295599
- Affirmative Action on Trial: Sex Discrimination in Johnson v. Santa Clara, Lawrence: University Press of Kansas, 1997. ISBN 9780700608300
- Lethal Judgments: Assisted Suicide and American Law, Lawrence: University Press of Kansas, 2000. ISBN 9780700610112
- Money and Free Speech: Campaign Finance Reform and the Courts, Lawrence: University Press of Kansas, 2005. ISBN 9780700614035
- Louis D. Brandeis: A Life, New York: Pantheon Books, 2009. ISBN 9780375423666
- Dissent and the Supreme Court: Its Role in the Court's History and the Nation's Constitutional Dialogue, New York: Pantheon Books, 2015. ISBN 9780307379405
- The Affirmative Action Puzzle: A Living History from Reconstruction to Today, Pantheon 2020, ISBN 9781101870877
