= Judaism Without Embellishment =

1963 antisemitic book

- Cover of Ukrainian first edition
- Author: Trofim Kichko
- Original title: Ukrainian: Іудаїзм без прикрас, romanized: Iudaizm bez prikras
- Language: Ukrainian, later other languages including French
- Subject: Antisemitic conspiracy theory
- Genre: Propaganda
- Publisher: Ukrainian Academy of Sciences
- Publication date: October 1963
- Publication place: Ukrainian Soviet Socialist Republic, Soviet Union

Judaism Without Embellishment (Ukrainian: Іудаїзм без прикрас, romanized: Iudaizm bez prikras) was a book published in 1963 by the Ukrainian Academy of Sciences. The book was written by Trofim Kichko, who worked at the academy. The book argued that a worldwide Jewish conspiracy existed, that the Jewish people were attempting to subvert the Soviet Union, and had played a role in the 1941 Nazi-German invasion of the country. The book was illustrated throughout with caricatures depicting Jewish people in a stereotypical and prejudicial manner, very similar to those that had been seen in Nazi antisemitic propaganda.

While the work was initially hailed as scientific work of distinction in analyzing the Jewish population of the Soviet Union and distributed for educational purposes across the nation, it was met with hostility from the international community. The work was condemned across Europe and the United States, leading to protests in Scandinavia when General Secretary Nikita Khrushchev toured the region. Communist parties in Europe and America also attacked the work and called for the Soviet government to withdraw its support for the work, and it from circulation. Under intense international pressure the Soviet government withdrew its support, and destroyed all copies. As a result, Kichko fell out of favor with the government. Although the book was destroyed, similar works continued to be published and several years later Kichko—having returned to grace—published a second antisemitic work.

Historians agree that Kichko was working under instructions of the central government, and that his work was the beginning of a new wave of government-sponsored anti-Semitism within the larger structure of the Soviet Union's attack on religion.

== Background ==
Under the rule of Joseph Stalin, the Soviet Union exploited earlier traditions of antisemitism that existed in its territories. Official policy deemed Jews to be foreign and traitorous elements. During the Great Purge of the 1930s, leading Jewish figures and institutions were targeted. Between 1948 and 1953, antisemitism became official state policy. The murder of Solomon Mikhoels, the director of the Moscow State Jewish Theater, was the start of a wave of antisemitism that aimed to destroy "all the Jewish cultural institutions that were left from the 1930s or that had been established during" the Second World War.

Following the death of Stalin, antisemitism waned allowing the Jewish population to live in fear no longer. However, antisemitism remained "invariably linked to the ideological and political concerns of the Kremlin and enjoyed strong roots in popular attitudes and behavior." From the mid-1950s onwards, a new wave of antisemitism permeated the Soviet Union inspired by Nikita Khrushchev and Leonid Brezhnev. This was further enhanced by Khrushchev's campaign against religion. The attack on Judaism "took on an antisemitic dimension." Soviet propaganda began to push the idea that Jewish people venerated capitalism and promoted the economic exploitation of non-Jewish people. Between 1959 and 1964, 1,847 anti-religious publications were printed. While only eight percent were focused solely on attacking Judaism, the vast majority included some form of attack. "The proportion of anti-Judaism titles was ... seven times larger than the proportion of Jews" in the Soviet Union. This was exacerbated by the number of copies of anti-Jewish work in circulation. On average 27,000 copies of any single piece of anti-Christian material were printed and 6,000 copies of anti-Islamic material, compared to the 46,000 copies of anti-Jewish publications. This amounted to 2.5 million anti-Jewish publications in print between 1959 and 1964. By the early 1960s, 85 percent of synagogues had been closed. No Yiddish schools were permitted within Russia, nor did any institutions within the Soviet Union provide courses in Yiddish, Hebrew or Jewish history. Of the 110 death sentences promulgated during that period for economic crimes, over 70 of them were imposed on Jewish defendants.

== Content ==
In October 1963, the Kiev-based Ukrainian Academy of Sciences published an initial batch of 12,000 copies of Judaism without Embellishment. This work was written by Trofim Kichko, a former Nazi German collaborator during the Second World War, a member of the Communist Party and a protégé of the Ukrainian Academy of Sciences. According to newly found research, Trofim Kichko was involved in the anti-fascist resistance in German occupied Ukraine.

His work was "a reworking of the turn-of-the-century tsarist police hoax known as Protocols of the Elders of Zion". Kichko's work argued for "the existence of a universal Jewish conspiracy involving Judaism, Jewish bankers, Zionism, and Western capitalism". The Jewish population were depicted as being reactionary and subversive, all of which was based on a religious belief in "virtually every ... unattractive moral quality". The text was supported throughout by "galling ... caricatures ... which [were] reminiscent of Nazi anti-Semitic propaganda", the likes of which had been seen in the official Nazi party newspaper Der Stürmer ("the most viciously anti-Jewish Nazi publication"). The image on the book cover was of a "hooked-nose rabbinical figure, standing at his pulpit with a sack of overflowing gold coins in his clawlike hands." While the work was similar to earlier literary attacks on Jews, Kichko went further, arguing that the German-led attack on the Soviet Union begun on 22 June 1941 was a joint affair between the Jewish people and Nazi Germany.

== Reaction ==
Within the Soviet Union, Judaism Without Embellishment was widely praised as a "scientific work of distinction". Izvestia, the official newspaper of the Soviet government, praised Kichko's work for "us[ing] new material in analyzing the reactionary nature of Judaism as a form of religious ideology." The work was extensively republished across the nation, and was "widely distributed ... among party cadres and educators."

On 24 February 1964, Morris B. Abram, the president of the American Jewish Committee, supported by a United States representative to the United Nations' Commission on Human Rights, brought Kichko's work to worldwide attention by attacking the book during a press conference. Shortly afterwards, international criticism was leveled at Kichko and his book. Communist parties worldwide condemned the work. The French communist newspaper L'Humanité denounced the book and demanded that the Soviet Union disavow the work. Gus Hall, the secretary-general of the United States Communist Party, stated, "[T]here is no doubt in my mind about the anti-Semitic character of what I have seen. Such stereotyped, slanderous caricatures of the Jewish people must be unequivocally condemned." To exploit this discontent with the Soviet Union, the American Central Intelligence Agency (CIA) had the book translated into French to be distributed to left-wing groups across Europe. When Khrushchev toured Scandinavia in the spring of 1964, demonstrations took place against the USSR's treatment of Jews, motivated in part by the publication of Judaism without Embellishment. In Ukraine, reaction to the book was also negative. Ukrainian nationalist Mykola Lebed saw the book "as a Soviet attempt to paint Ukrainians with a broad anti-Semitic brush". This resulted in Ukrainians, especially among the former supporters of Stepan Bandera, switching from using antisemitism as a weapon to use against the Soviet authorities to attacking the Soviet government for being antisemitic.

Caving to international pressure, the Soviet government abandoned support for the book. On 4 April 1964, the Soviet newspaper Pravda—the newspaper of the Soviet Communist Party—announced an official change in policy. The statement read, "The author of the book and the authors of the preface wrongly interpreted some questions concerning the emergence and development of this religion. ... [A] number of mistaken propositions and illustrations could insult the feelings of believers and might even be interpreted in the spirit of anti-Semitism." The paper continued "There is no such thing as anti-Semitism in the USSR and cannot be." The Soviet Communist Party's ideological committee withdrew the work from circulation and destroyed all copies. As a result, Kichko fell out of favor and "temporarily sank into obscurity."

== Aftermath ==
Despite the withdrawal of Kichko's work, it was soon replaced by similar works by other authors. On 4 October 1967, an article by Kichko was published in Komsomolskoye Znamya, a provincial newspaper in Ukraine. On 20 January 1968, Pravda Ukrainy, the central newspaper of Ukraine, "reported that Kichko was being rewarded with a scroll of honor for his 'services to atheist propaganda'". This was followed by the publication of his second work: Judaism and Zionism, an antisemitic and anti-Israeli work that reiterated the hoax of a worldwide Jewish conspiracy.

== Analysis ==
Journalist Leonid Vladimirov asserted that information gleaned from friends in Kiev suggested that Kichko was able to overcome his background and rise to a position of authority within the Ukrainian scientific community owing to his devotion to antisemitic research. Vladimirov commented that "there are services in Russia for which even collaborators are pardoned". Maurice Friedberg states that the publication of Judaism without Embellishment was "a precursor of the resurgence of officially sponsored anti-Semitism".

Stefan T. Possony asserts that Kichko "was ordered to write" his book and "his fabrications were ordered to be published in the Ukrainian language" with the aim of embroiling "the Jews with the Ukrainians once again." The Canadian-Ukrainian historians Ivan Katchanovski, Zenon E. Kohut, Bohdan Y. Nebesio and Myroslav Yurkevich are all in agreement. They argue that in an effort "to discredit Ukrainian nationalism", the Soviet government was attempting to "associate Soviet Ukrainian institutions with anti-Semitic publications", and that the best-known example of this was Kichko's work. Amir Weiner argues along similar lines, stating that Kichko's work was not an "accidental slip", as evidenced by the "belated Soviet reaction".

== See also ==
- Movement to Free Soviet Jewry
- On the Jewish Question
