= Emanuele Ottolenghi =

Italian political scientist

Emanuele Ottolenghi (born 1969) is an Italian political scientist and publicist. He is a Senior Research Fellow at CENTEF and a senior advisor to 240 Analytics, a risk intelligence platform.

From 2010 to 2024 he was a Senior Fellow with the Foundation for Defense of Democracies in Washington, DC and a Leone Ginzburg Research Fellow in Israel Studies at the Oxford Centre for Hebrew and Jewish Studies and the St. Antony's College Middle East Centre.

== Early life and education ==
From 1993 to 1995, Ottolenghi was a junior research assistant at the Israel Democracy Institute in Jerusalem. He earned a Ph.D. from the Hebrew University and an undergraduate degree from the University of Bologna. He has taught at the Oxford Centre for Hebrew and Jewish Studies, as well as the Middle East Centre of St. Antony’s College, Oxford. He was at Oxford University from 1998 to 2006. From 2006 to 2010, he ran the Brussels-based AJC Transatlantic Institute.

From 2010 to 2024, Ottolenghi was a member of the Foundation for Defense of Democracies' (FDD) Center on Economic and Financial Power (CEFP).

== Activities ==
Ottolenghi's early research interests were Israeli domestic policy, constitutional and electoral law issues, as well as Italian foreign policy and the Middle East conflict. He has published articles on these topics in academic compilations. He has expertise on antisemitism, Iran, Israel, Italy, and terrorism.

He has written about Middle East issues for Commentary, The Daily Mirror, The Guardian, National Review Online, Newsday, the Jewish Chronicle, and the Middle East Quarterly, as well as European publications: Corriere del Ticino, il Foglio, Libero, Il Riformista, Liberal, Standpoint, L'Unità, and Die Welt.

During his time at the Foundation for Defense of Democracies, he researched Iran's illicit procurement networks and, since 2015, he focused on Iran's and Hezbollah's global footprint, particularly in Latin America.

== Positions ==
Ottolenghi stated that Iran would use institutions like Al Mustafa International University to build propaganda networks in Latin America. He warned these structures could support future terrorist activities. On 12 September 2023, in an interview for B'nai B'rith International's Lens on Latin America program, he addressed Iran's activities in the region, referring to Hezbollah's illicit networks, Iran's efforts to evade sanctions, and the strategic significance of Latin America for Tehran’s global operations.

== Personal life ==
Emanuele Ottolenghi lives in Bologna, Italy.

== Works ==
Essays

- Immobility, stability and ineffectiveness. Assessing the impact of direct election of Israeli prime minister. In: The journal of legislative studies, Vol. 5 (1999), Booklet 1, p. 35–53.
- Why Palestinians and Israelis are not ready for peace. In: Survival - global politics and strategy. Vol. 46 (2004/05), Booklet 1, p. 41–54.

Books

- The Pasdaran: Inside Iran's Islamic Revolutionary Guards Corps (Washington, FDD Press: 2011).
- Iran: the Looming Crisis (London, Profile Books: 2010).
- Under a Mushroom Cloud: Europe, Iran and the Bomb (London, Profile Books: 2009).
- La Bomba Iraniana (Turin, Lindau: 2008).
- Autodafe': L'Europa, gli ebrei e l'antisemitismo (Turin, Lindau: 2007).
