= Steven T. Katz =

American philosopher and scholar (born 1944)

Steven Theodore Katz (born August 24, 1944) is an American philosopher and scholar. He is the founding director of the Elie Wiesel Center for Judaic Studies at Boston University in Massachusetts, United States, where he holds the Alvin J. and Shirley Slater Chair in Jewish and Holocaust Studies.

== Biography ==
Katz was born in Jersey City, New Jersey.

He received his Ph.D. from the University of Cambridge, England, in 1972.

Prior to his appointment at Boston University, Prof. Katz taught at Dartmouth College from 1972 to 1984. He joined the faculty of Cornell University in 1984 through 1996 as a Professor of Near Eastern Studies (Judaica); during the years 1985–1989 he served as Chair of the Department of Near Eastern Studies and Director of the Jewish Studies Program. He has also held visiting posts at Yale, the University of California at Santa Barbara, Hebrew University of Jerusalem, the University of Pennsylvania, Yeshiva University, Harvard and Warwick University.

He currently edits Modern Judaism: A Journal of Jewish Ideas and Experience, published by Oxford University Press.

== Academic misconduct censure ==
In early 1995 Katz's appointment as the director of the United States Holocaust Memorial Museum was announced. Shortly afterward it was reported that Katz had been disciplined by Cornell for two matters. Katz had misrepresented how close a book he was writing (The Holocaust in Historical Context) was to publication. In documents dating to 1983 Katz had claimed that the book's publication was imminent on Harvard University Press, while it actually only appeared in 1994 on Oxford University Press. A 1991 Cornell report by three deans found that Katz had "knowingly and deliberately misrepresented his claims of completed and published scholarly works" in both his resume and grant applications. Katz was also punished by Cornell (his salary was frozen for years) because during a 1989 sabbatical he had accepted a paid teaching position at the University of Pennsylvania, in violation of Cornell policy. Katz maintained his innocence, but in the wake of much criticism from within the Jewish community and Holocaust museum board he stepped down in March 1995.

== Scientific research ==
=== Mysticism ===
Katz adopts a "contextualist" interpretation of mysticism, and has contributed to and edited a number of books dealing with mysticism. He distinguishes two basic approaches to the scientific study and understanding of mysticism: an "essentialist model" and a "contextualist model".

The essentialist model argues that mystical experience is independent of the sociocultural, historical and religious context in which it occurs, and regards all mystical experience in its essence to be the same.

The contextualist model states that mystical experiences are shaped by the concepts "which the mystic brings to, and which shape, his experience". What is being experienced is being determined by the expectations and the conceptual background of the mystic.

=== Jewish studies ===
Katz has argued that the Holocaust is "phenomenologically unique" and the only genocide that has occurred in history, and defines Holocaust to include only "the travail of European Jewry" and not other victims of the Nazis. He has argued this in depth in The Holocaust in Historical Context. In 2019 the second volume was released and the third is in the works.

Katz is the editor of Modern Judaism, an academic quarterly. He was on the editorial board of the Encyclopaedia of the Holocaust (NY: Macmillan, 1990, Hebrew and English-language editions).

Professor Katz acts as an American representative on the European Union sponsored International Task Force on the Holocaust. Additionally, he still holds a position as Chair of the Holocaust Commission of the Memorial Foundation for Jewish Culture, after previously serving on the United States Holocaust Museum's Academic Committee for five years as their Chair.

== Selected publications ==
- Jewish Philosophers (Bloch Publishing, 1975)
- Jewish Ideas and Concepts (Schocken Books, 1977)
- Mysticism and Philosophical Analysis (Oxford University Press, 1978)
- Studies by Samuel Horodezky (Arno Press, 1980)
- Saadiah Gaon (Arno Press, 1980)
- Maimonides: Selected Essays (Arno Press, 1980)
- Collected papers of Jacob Guttmann (Arno Press, 1980)
- Jewish Neo-Platonism (Arno Press, 1980)
- Medieval Jewish Philosophy (Arno Press, 1980)
- Mysticism and Religious Traditions (Oxford University Press, 1983)
- Post-Holocaust Dialogues: critical studies in modern Jewish thought (New York University Press, 1983)
- The Cambridge History of Nineteenth Century Religious Thought in the West 3 Vols. (Cambridge University Press, 1988)
- Anti-semitism in Times of Crisis (New York University Press, 1991)
- Frontiers of Jewish Thought (B'nai B'rith Books, 1992)
- Mysticism and Language (Oxford University Press, 1992)
- Historicism, the Holocaust and Zionism: critical studies in modern Jewish thought and history (New York University Press, 1992)
- Interpreters of Judaism in the Late Twentieth Century (B'nai B'rith Books, 1993)
- The Holocaust and Comparative History (Leo Baeck Institute, 1993)
- The Holocaust in Historical Context, Vol. 1 (Oxford University Press, 1994)
- American rabbi : the life and thought of Jacob B. Agus (New York University Press, 1997)
- Mysticism and Sacred Scripture (Oxford University Press, 2000)
- Kontinuität und Diskontinität zwischen christlichen und nationalsozialistischem Antisemitismus (In German and English) (J.C.B. Mohr (Paul Siebeck), 2001)
- The Impact of the Holocaust on Jewish Theology (New York University Press, 2005)
- The Cambridge History of Judaism, vol. 4: The Late Roman-Rabbinic Period (Cambridge University Press, 2006)
- Obliged by Memory: Literature, Religion, Ethics (Syracuse University Press, 2006)
- Wrestling with God: Jewish Theological Responses During and After the Holocaust (Oxford University Press, 2007)
- The shtetl: new evaluations (New York University Press, 2007)

== Awards ==
- 1984 - National Jewish Book Award for Post-Holocaust Dialogues
- 1994 - "Outstanding book in philosophy and theology" (American Association of University Publishers) for The Holocaust in Historical Context
- 1999 - Dr. Leopold Lucas Prize (University of Tübingen) awarded by Professor Volker Drehsen with an address entitled "Continuity and Discontinuity between Christian and Nazi Antisemitism"
- 2007 - National Jewish Book Award for Volume IV of The Cambridge History of Judaism, The Late Roman-Rabbinic Period

=== Finalist ===
- 2007 - National Jewish Book Award runner-up for Wrestling with God: Jewish Theological Responses During and After the Holocaust

== Sources ==
- Katz, Steven T. (2000), Mysticism and Sacred Scripture, Oxford University Press
