= Opposition to antisemitism =

Opposition to hostility, prejudice, or discrimination against Jews

The opposition to antisemitism or prejudice against Jews, and, just like the history of antisemitism, the history of anti-antisemitism is long and multi-faceted.

== Strategies ==
Yair Wallach argues that non-Bolshevik Jewish activists played an essential role in the successes of early Soviet anti-antisemitism, and he also argues that this fact proves that Jewish activists are essential to effectively combating antisemitism in 2021.

In the US, a plethora of novels which opposed antisemitism was published in the 1940s, a subgenre of social protest literature.

Peter Kuras, an American writer and translator writing in Jewish Currents, notes that after the 2015 European migrant crisis, German institutions have created positions for fighting antisemitism—sometimes specifically and sometimes with additional responsibilities. These positions are covered by non-Jews, but work with German Jewish organizations.

== Anti-antisemitism and antiracism ==
Opposition to antisemitism in the United Kingdom has historically been linked to anti-racism, but in the 1990s, it began to diverge. Anthony Lester, the drafter of the Race Relations Act 1976, cited his experience of antisemitism as his motivation for writing a bill combating all forms of racial prejudice. According to Gidley and colleagues, this divergence came about in part due to disagreement over Zionism and anti-Zionism. The idea of white privilege, structural racism, and perceptions that racism is based on skin color and colonialism made it harder to identify antisemitism, given that Jews are often considered white.

Some scholars argue that Islamophobia is similar to antisemitism because both prejudices are ethnoreligious ones. In the twenty-first century, several radical right parties in Western Europe began to use anti-antisemitic and pro-Israel rhetoric as a means to oppose Muslim immigration and promote the belief that a clash of civilizations is occurring between Judeo-Christian Europe and the Muslim world. This belief is expressed along with the belief that Jews who live outside Israel are not part of the nations in which they live because they are only 'tolerated' guests. In Hungary, right-wing parties such as Fidesz and Jobbik distanced themselves from antisemitism and expressed pro-Israel beliefs, although Fidesz also promotes George Soros conspiracy theories. According to anthropologist Ivan Kalmar, "Anti-antisemitism allows populists to promote Islamophobia openly without the fear of being labelled Nazis."

According to historian Omer Bartov, political controversies around antisemitism involve "those who see the world through an antisemitic prism, for whom everything that has gone wrong with the world, or with their personal lives, is the fault of the Jews; and those who see the world through an anti-antisemitic prism, for whom every critical observation of Jews as individuals or as a community, or, most crucially, of the state of Israel, is inherently antisemitic".

Anti-antisemitism is "a defining marker of post-war German identity". Judith Gruber, a Christian theologian at the KU Leuven, argues that the belief that Germany has successfully confronted the Holocaust enables the projection of antisemitism onto the outside world, especially to Muslim immigrants—a subtle form of Islamophobia that coexists with the vehement rejection of antisemitism. Hannah Tzuberi, research assistant at Freie Universität Berlin's Institute of Jewish Studies, argues that in Germany, anti-antisemitism can extend beyond Germans' identification with Jews because it can even include the identification of Germans as Jews and the identification of Germany as Israel.

Kuras notes that the German institutional effort against antisemitism is not accompanied by an equivalent effort against Islamophobia, racism, and anti-Ziganism. Berlin officer Samuel Salzborn has argued that antisemitism and racism in Germany are different.

== Anti-antisemitism and philosemitism ==
The claim that anti-antisemitism is synonymous with philosemitism is disputed; anti-antisemitism often includes the "imaginary and symbolic idealization of 'the Jew'", which is similar to philosemitism.

== Anti-antisemitic watchdog organizations ==
According to Jonathan Judaken, anti-antisemitic watchdog organizations "may inadvertently help stoke new cases by giving activists a megaphone". He suggested that watchdog groups raise money by portraying antisemitism as a serious threat. In the United States, all watchdog organizations are pro-Israel.

== Public opinion ==
According to public opinion surveys, the amount of anti-antisemitism in Poland (defined as "the rejection of any statements criticizing Jews") increased between 2002 and 2012.

== See also ==
- Anti-antisemitism in Germany
- Antisemitism by country
- History of antisemitism
- Jewish anti-racism
- New antisemitism
- Normalization of antisemitism
- StopAntisemitism
- Weaponization of antisemitism
