= Activist deportations from Germany =

In 2025, letters were sent from the Berlin Immigration Office to deport four non-citizen residents (an American citizen, Polish citizen and two Irish citizens). The letter cites charges arising from the residents' involvement in protests against Israel's war on Gaza.

According to The Intercept, the only one of the four whose deportation order include a charge (of calling a police officer a fascist) was acquitted by a criminal court in Berlin. The Intercept also wrote that, "the head of crime prevention and repatriation at the immigration agency (...) warned that the legal basis for revoking the three EU citizens’ freedom of movement was insufficient — and that deporting them would be unlawful".

== Background ==
According to Deutsche Welle, "activists have criticized Germany in particular for disproportionately harsh treatment and restrictions on freedom of expression". Francesca Albanese described, "the irrational fear of open dialogue, literally policed by the police, represents a terrifying descent into a newly normalized state of affairs, which has permeated many strata of German society". Amnesty International raised concerns "about restrictions of freedom of expression and freedom of assembly through blanket, pre-emptive bans imposed on assemblies on the occasion of Nakba Remembrance Day in Berlin".

All four are alleged to have participated in a protest at the Free University of Berlin.

== Contents of the order ==
One of the orders reportedly say "It is in the considerable interest of society and the state that this Staatsräson (de) is always brought to life and that at no time – neither at home nor abroad – do any doubts arise that opposing currents are even tolerated within the federal territory." Staatsräson is a term "to contend that Israel's security and existence are among the fundamental duties of the German state" but that "neither has a legal basis, nor is it enshrined in the constitution."

== Responses ==
Ireland's prime minister Micheál Martin has said he will raise the deportation of both Irish citizens with the German authorities.

== Analysis ==
Matthias Goldmann described the deportations as "a fight against certain political views" with antisemitism used as a pretext "to dismantle the protections afforded by the rule of law". Goldmann also criticized the Berlin state government describing the Berlin state government as "the most problematic in Germany when it comes to the fight against those showing solidarity with Palestine".

== See also ==
- Anti-antisemitism in Germany
- Visa and deportation controversies in the second Trump administration
