= Anti-antisemitism in Germany =

Opposition to antisemitism in German institutions

Anti-antisemitism in Germany is the German state's institutionalised opposition to antisemitism, in acknowledgement of the murder of some six million Jews by the Nazi regime in the Holocaust. Anti-antisemitism has been described as "a defining marker of post-war German identity" and a commitment to supporting Israel is considered a Staatsräson, a fundamental principle guiding the German state's actions, a doctrine articulated by German Chancellor Angela Merkel in 2008. Following the 2015 European migrant crisis, the German federal government and most of Germany's states set up commissioners for fighting antisemitism.

Controversially, the German antisemitism commissioners condemn the following as antisemitic: the Boycott, Divestment, and Sanctions movement, accusations that Israel is committing the crime of apartheid or a genocide against Palestinians, and the depiction of Israel as a colonial or settler-colonial entity. Many of those arrested and cancelled in Germany over allegations of antisemitism have been Jews critical of Israel's policies.

== Background and history ==
According to Aleida Assmann, "the empirical history of evolving memory politics in postwar Germany and in recent times" is the key context for the emergence of institutionalised anti-antisemitism in the 21st century.

In the decades after the war, Holocaust memory was largely confined to the survivors and their communities, a period described by Assmann as "the time when forgetting was prescribed ... by the postwar society and [German Chancellor] Adenauer’s Schlussstrich policy (drawing a line under the past). In the 1980s, this period was disrupted by the Bitburg controversy, sparked by U.S. President Ronald Reagan and German Chancellor Helmut Kohl's joint visit to a cemetery that also included graves of Waffen-SS conscripts, and the Historikerstreit ("historians' dispute"). (Note: The German word Streit translates variously as "quarrel", "dispute", or "conflict". The most common translation of Historikerstreit in English-language academic discourse is "historians' dispute", although the German term is often used.) The latter was a dispute in the late 1980s in West Germany between conservative and left-of-center academics and other intellectuals about how to incorporate Nazi Germany and the Holocaust into German historiography, and more generally into German people's view of themselves – a key focus of debate being the extent to which the methods and ideologies that led to Auschwitz were not unique to Nazi Germany but had roots in earlier historical events, in particular the Stalinist Gulag system.

In the wake of the Historikerstreit, the popularity of Holocaust memory peaked in the 1990s after the fall of Communism, and became central to Western historical consciousness as a symbol of the ultimate human evil. The Australian Genocide scholar and historian A. Dirk Moses asserted that "the Holocaust has gradually supplanted genocide as modernity's icon of evil"; renowned German historian Wolfgang Benz described it as the "singularly most monstrous crime committed in the history of mankind". Holocaust education, designed to promote citizenship while reducing prejudice generally, became widespread at the same time.

According to Wolfgang Streeck, by the mid-nineties and especially the 1995 assassination of Yitzhak Rabin, it became clear that the Oslo Accords were doomed to fail and that Israel saw military superiority, colonization and annexation of the occupied territories along with apartheid-like domestic repression as a more promising path than a negotiated peace settlement leading to a two-state solution. Streeck argues that international criticism of Israel, especially from the Global South, placed increasing pressure on Germany, from Israel and the United States, to intensify its support of Israel as mandated by its Staatsräson, and the German government revised its reading of the lessons of the Third Reich – originally understood to lie in supporting both international law and the Jewish state of Israel – to emphasize the latter at the expense of the former. According to Donatella della Porta and Leandros Fischer, the anti-German movement – a leftist splinter group known for flying the Israeli flag and wearing IDF shirts that originally arose as a response to German reunification – played a particular role in shifting the entire German left's discourse on the Israeli–Palestinian conflict to the right.

Israeli-American Holocaust historian Omer Bartov states that Germany has developed its own interpretation of the lessons of the Holocaust, which is strongly influenced by its historical responsibility: that Germany must protect Israel under all circumstances. For this reason, Bartov says, any criticism of Israel is treated with great caution in Germany to avoid being considered antisemitic, a view that has deeply influenced German foreign policy and leads to the fact that Germany often unilaterally sides with Israel, even when international law is violated. With the sole exception of the Linke party, the Staatsräson ideology came to be supported by all political parties represented in the German parliament, including the far-right Alternative für Deutschland.

According to A. Dirk Moses, German anti-antisemitism has involved the infusion of new tropes into German public discourse, with a focus on "post-colonial antisemitism", "Israel-related antisemitism" and "hatred of Israel", creating a link between antisemitism—hatred of Jews—and anti-Zionism. It is used, he says, to imply that solidarity with Palestinians, which is particularly widespread in the global south, is due to hatred of Jews rather than the expression of a legitimate political view of the Israeli occupation of Palestine, the aim of this being to prevent postcolonial academics as well as the German art and museum scenes from fostering the spread of such views.

Major public debates followed the invitation—and subsequent disinvitation due to political pressure—of postcolonial Cameroonian philosopher Achille Mbembe to the 2020 Ruhrtriennale festival. The Catechism debate, also known as Historikerstreit 2.0, was initiated by A. Dirk Moses with his 2021 essay "The German Catechism". The invitation of a Palestinian art collective to the Documenta fifteen art exhibition in 2022 added further fuel to the public debate in Germany.

== Creation of antisemitism commissioners ==
In the late 2010s and early 2020s, following the 2015 European migrant crisis, German institutions created full-time or part-time positions for fighting antisemitism. The German Parliament decided to establish the office of "Commissioner of the Government for Jewish Life in Germany and the Fight against Anti-Semitism" in January 2018; in addition, 15 of the 16 federal states (Bundesländer) had appointed their own antisemitism commissioners by 2024, with five of these states having additional commissioners in their chief public prosecutors' offices. As of 2024, the commissioners are – with the exception of one who converted to Judaism after his appointment – non-Jews who work in concert with German Jewish organizations.

Heidrun Friese (Chemnitz University of Technology) has described the creation of the commissioners as a key moment in the development of what she calls "institutionalized anti-anti-Semitism". The Jerusalem Post called Germany's Federal Commissioner for Jewish Life and the Fight against Antisemitism, Felix Klein, who was appointed to the role in 2018 and served until 2026, "Germany's anti-antisemitism strategist", noting his receipt of the Conference of European Rabbis's Moshe Rosen Prize in 2024, because he "played a leading role in developing a comprehensive strategy to combat antisemitism in Germany, giving special attention to Jewish life in politics and society during difficult times and raising awareness of Jewish life in Germany."

Peter Kuras, writing in Jewish Currents, says that Klein described the context for the creation of these positions as the large influx of immigrants and refugees from the Middle East, thought to harbour anti-Jewish sentiments. Kuras says that the antisemitism commissioners frequently speak of an increase in what some have called "imported" antisemitism. While only a small fraction of antisemitic incidents (1 percent in 2021) are classified as Islamic, and there is no apparent correlation between immigration and violent antisemitic attacks (committed almost entirely by far-right ethnic Germans), the vast majority of the discourse revolves around racialized minority groups and those intellectuals who stand in solidarity with them, according to Irit Dekel (Indiana University Bloomington) and Esra Öyzürek (University of Cambridge). Judith Gruber (KU Leuven) writes that the belief that Germany has successfully confronted The Holocaust enables the projection of antisemitism onto the outside world, especially to Muslim immigrants—a subtle form of Islamophobia that coexists with the vehement rejection of antisemitism.

Although hate-motivated violence against asylum seekers, Muslim Germans, and refugee aid workers occurs much more frequently, no equivalent institution was created on behalf of Muslim victims of hate crimes. The antisemitism commissioners were controversial from their outset and continuously over the first five years of their operation.

== Areas of contention ==
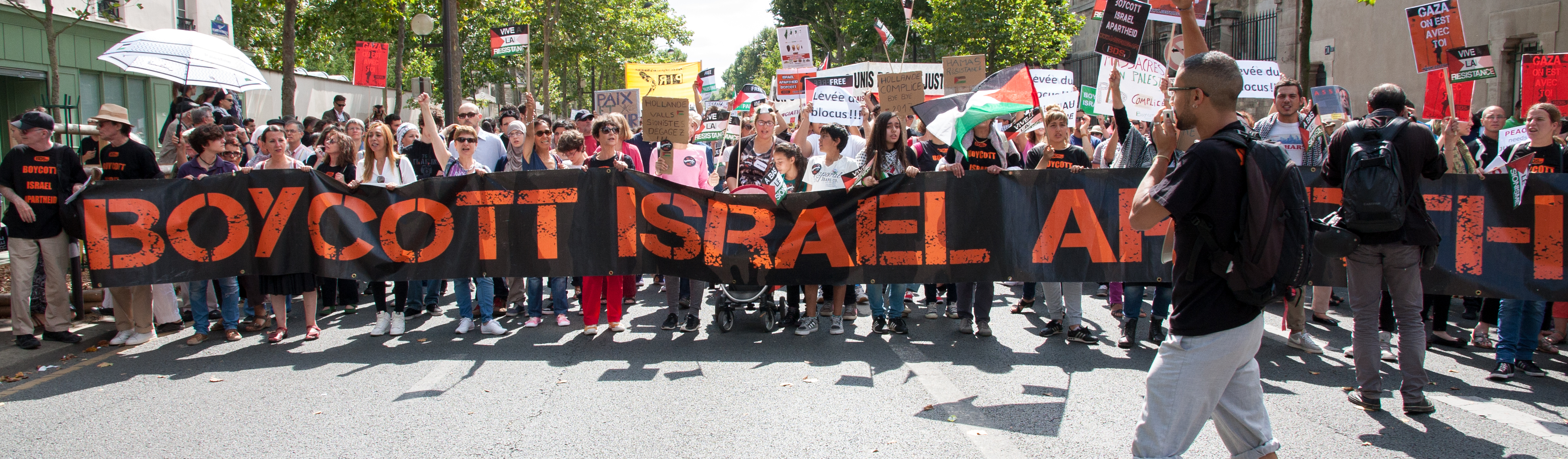
Both the call to boycott Israel and the characterization of Israeli policies as apartheid are denounced as antisemitic in Germany.

Particular points in the German debate include the controversial characterization as antisemitism, and consequent rejection, of the following:

- the Boycott, Divestment and Sanctions movement,
- accusations that Israel is committing the crime of apartheid or a genocide against Palestinians, and
- the depiction of Israel as a colonial or settler-colonial entity.

In 2019, the Bundestag passed a resolution declaring Germany's "unique historical responsibility", which entailed prioritizing "the fight against antisemitism and a commitment to Israel's security" as part of Germany's Staatsräson. The resolution also declared the BDS movement antisemitic and compared it to the 1933 Nazi boycott of Jewish businesses. This comparison—and the belief that BDS is "nothing less than the start of a road to another Holocaust"—is prevalent in Germany. The comparison has been described as "highly questionable, if not pure demagogy" by peace researcher Gert Krell, who argues there is a significant difference between objecting to a military occupation and targeting a powerless minority in a totalitarian state. In 2024, Germany labeled BDS as a "suspected extremist threat"—despite its commitment to non-violence. Although the ability to block BDS is limited by protections on freedom of expression, the anti-BDS efforts have had a significant effect.

The position of antisemitism commissioner Klein and other German antisemitism monitors has been that the apartheid allegation represents a "demonization of the Jewish State of Israel"; therefore, slogans and stickers such as "no pride in apartheid" have been registered as antisemitic incidents. In contrast, the International Court of Justice stated in its 2024 advisory opinion on the "Legal Consequences arising from the Policies and Practices of Israel in the Occupied Palestinian Territory, including East Jerusalem" that Israel had violated Article 3 of the International Convention on the Elimination of All Forms of Racial Discrimination, which contains the prohibition of racial segregation and apartheid. Believing that Israel has been guilty of the crime of genocide in Gaza or is engaged in settler colonialism is classified as "Israel-related antisemitism" by Germany's antisemitism commissioners, who have repeatedly intervened in the internal affairs of academic institutions to exclude or marginalize these viewpoints.

== 2024 antisemitism resolution ==
In November 2024, an antisemitism resolution proposed by the German mainstream parties "to protect Jewish life" passed with a great cross-party majority in the German parliament, with only the newly formed Sahra Wagenknecht Alliance voting against. The resolution ties public arts and science funding in Germany to the International Holocaust Remembrance Alliance's (IHRA) definition of antisemitism, which critics say conflates criticism of Israel with Jew hatred. The resolution was praised by the Israeli government and the state-funded Central Council of Jews in Germany, but Jewish artists and academics in Germany came out strongly against it, with some warning that it identified Jewishness with the policies of the state of Israel and might lead to the "surreal" situation where Jewish and Israeli human rights groups are deemed antisemitic by the German state. In May 2025, 55 mainly Jewish Holocaust researchers, historians and academics supported the Linke party's adoption of the Jerusalem Declaration on Antisemitism, an alternative formulation to the IHRA definition, designed to allow greater scope for criticism of Israeli government policy.

== RIAS ==
RIAS (Recherche- und Informationsstelle Antisemitismus) is a private, but publicly funded research and data collection centre, partly financed by the Commissioner of the Government for Jewish Life in Germany and the Fight against Anti-Semitism.

The civil society association Verein für Demokratische Kultur in Berlin (VDK) launched the project RIAS Berlin in 2015, as a civic point of contact for victims of antisemitism, later growing into a city-wide network for reporting. At a national level, the Federal Association of Departments for Research and Information on Antisemitism (Bundesverband RIAS e.V.) was founded in Berlin in late 2018. It collects data on actions it deems antisemitic, such as criticisms of Israel and uses of the slogan "From the river to the sea"; this includes actions "that have not been reported to the police or do not constitute criminal acts". RIAS also distributes leaflets inviting members of the public to submit reports of any antisemitic acts, which it then uses to publish reports and statistics on antisemitism. This results in information, including accusations against private individuals, being collected and stored by a non-state institution. As of mid-2025, RIAS operated in eleven of the German Länder.

RIAS has been accused of running or enabling smear campaigns against academics, of using problematic data collection methods and of serving the interests of the Israeli right. Ronen Steinke said in 2025 that RIAS was using an "extremely expansive definition of antisemitism", giving the example of a 2020 Holocaust memorial speech by Jewish historian Moshe Zimmermann that RIAS listed as an antisemitic incident in its report (without mentioning Zimmermann by name) because Zimmermann said that "Never again" applied to everyone, including Israel.

== Deplatforming and arrest of Jews ==
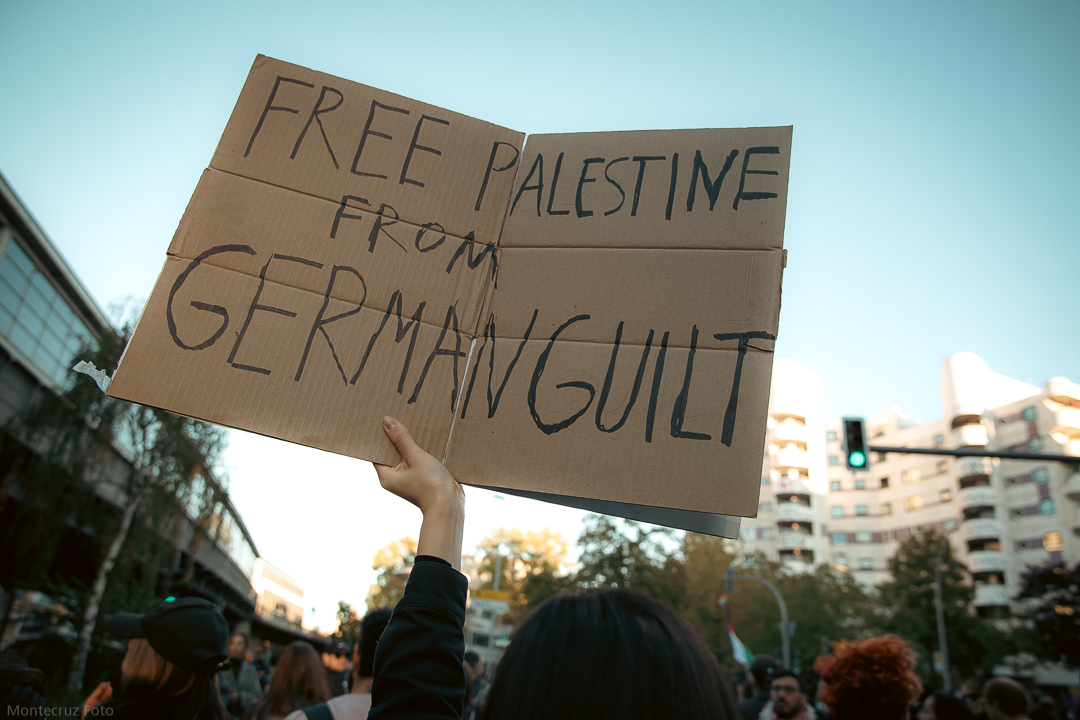
A sign at a pro-Palestine demonstration in Kreuzberg on 21 October 2023

Numerous Jewish speakers—including Nancy Fraser and Masha Gessen—have been deplatformed in Germany due to criticism of the Israeli state deemed beyond the bounds of German public discourse, while other Jewish activists—including Adam Broomberg and other members of the anti-Zionist group Jüdische Stimme (Jewish Voice)—have been arrested at pro-Palestinian protests. Jüdische Stimme also had its bank accounts repeatedly frozen amid accusations that it supports BDS and "demonizes and delegitimizes the Israeli state in particular".

British-Israeli professor Eyal Weizman, the founder of Forensic Architecture, said that it was ironic that he and other Jews were "being lectured by the children and grandchildren of the perpetrators who murdered our families and who now dare to tell us that we are antisemitic". Israeli filmmaker Yuval Abraham similarly said, "To stand on German soil as the son of Holocaust survivors and call for a ceasefire—and to then be labelled as antisemitic is not only outrageous, it is also literally putting Jewish lives in danger ... If this is Germany's way of dealing with its guilt over the Holocaust, they are emptying it of all meaning." A group of Jewish-Israeli students in Berlin working on an art project titled "Unlearning Zionism" had its funding withdrawn and was accused of antisemitism—"How can we and our work be placed in an intimate connection with the ideology of Nazis?" asked Yehudit Yinhar, a member of the group, whose grandmother fled Berlin in 1938. Jews represent less than 1% of the German population, yet in 2023, of the 84 cases of deplatforming or cancellation documented by the German Diaspora Alliance, a quarter (25%) targeted Jewish individuals or groups with Jewish members. According to researcher Emily Dische-Becker, nearly a third of the people cancelled over antisemitism allegations in recent years have been Jews.

In August 2024, an open letter published by Die Tageszeitung and signed by 150 Jewish personalities expressed the view that the German draft resolution "to protect Jewish life" was focusing on the wrong people. The letter said: "We do not fear our Muslim neighbours, nor do we fear our fellow artists, writers and academics. We fear the growing right-wing, as evidenced by mass gatherings of neo-Nazis emboldened by a national climate of xenophobic fear. We fear Alternative for Germany (AfD), the country's second-most popular political party, whose leaders knowingly traffic in Nazi rhetoric. This threat is barely mentioned in the resolution."

South African Jewish artist Candice Breitz – herself de-platformed in Germany – criticized the German approach as part of a troubling dynamic where Germans decided who were "good Jews" and "bad Jews" in order to suppress dissent. Her views were echoed by Eyal Weizman: "The irony that the German state would actually classify who is a Jew, what's a legitimate Jewish position, and how Jews should react, is just beneath contempt."

== Government responses and initiatives ==
In October 2024, Felix Klein, Germany's Commissioner for Jewish Life and the Fight against Antisemitism, stated that "open and aggressive antisemitism", described as a "poison for social cohesion", was "stronger than at any time since 1945". In the same month, Thomas Strobl, Interior Minister of Baden-Württemberg, reassured the Jewish community that they would be protected amid rising antisemitism.

In September 2025, during the reopening of the Synagogue on Reichenbachstraße in Munich, Chancellor Friedrich Merz noted that Germany was experiencing a new wave of antisemitism and committed the federal government to counter every form of antisemitism.

In March 2026, the state government of Schleswig‑Holstein proposed tightening criminal laws to strengthen protections against antisemitism and anti‑Israel agitation. The initiative, led by Minister‑President Daniel Günther, aimed at classifying hatred against Jews and Israelis as particularly serious cases of incitement to hatred and increase minimum sentences for such offences.

== Reception ==
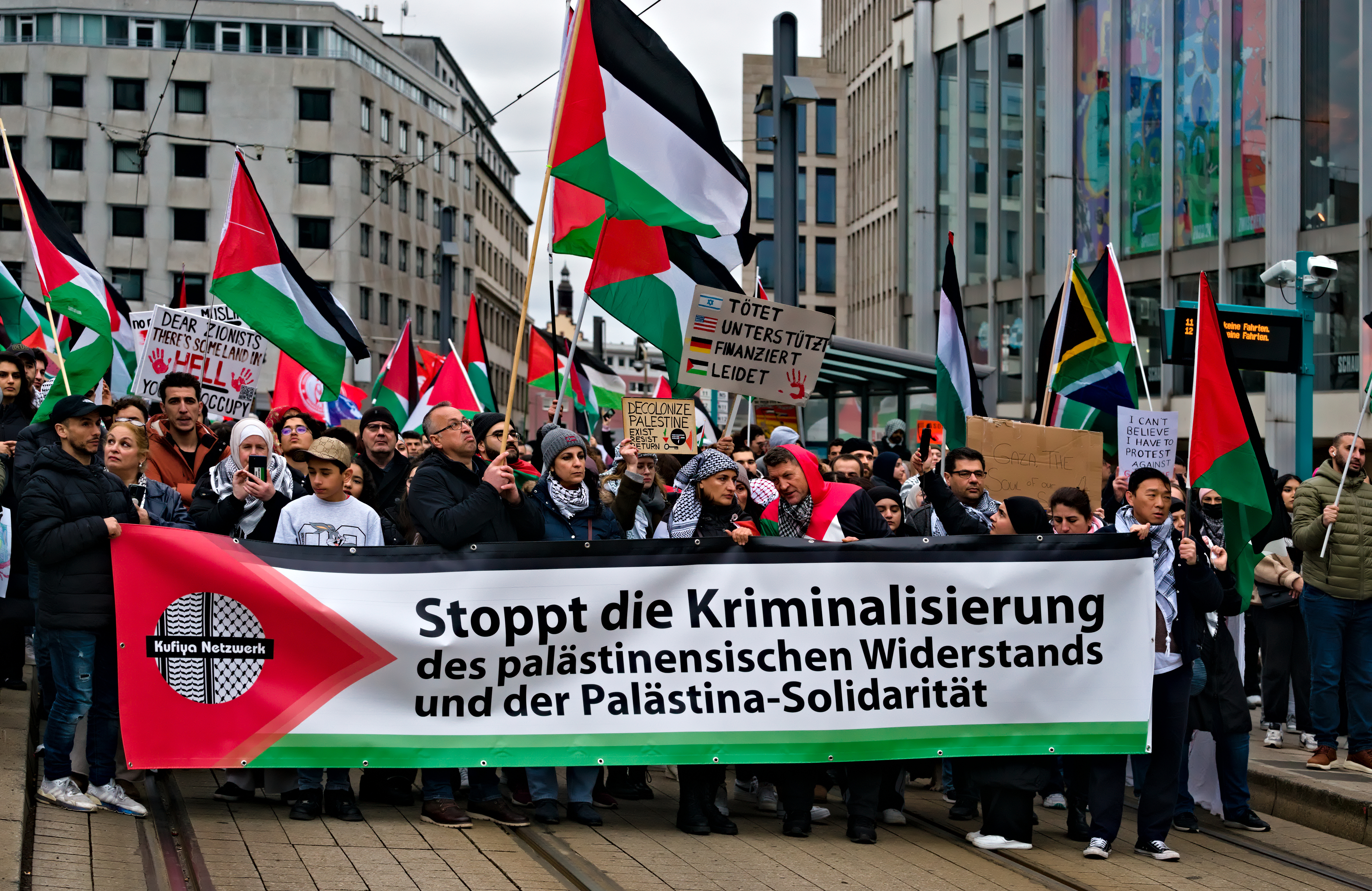
Pro-Palestinian protestors in Frankfurt, 2024. The banner states, "Stop the criminalization of the Palestinian resistance and Palestine solidarity". In the background: "Israel kills, America supports, Germany finances, Palestine suffers".

The approach has led to complaints about a type of McCarthyism from German and international scholars, artists, writers and intellectuals. Critics of the commissioners argue that they rely heavily on reporting from pro-Israeli NGOs, who investigate the backgrounds of invited speakers in order to find material that can be used in an attempt to cancel them.

In 2023, more than 400 scholars, among them Judith Butler and Noam Chomsky, published an open letter "opposing ideological or political interference and litmus tests in Germany." Several dozen prominent Jewish academics signed another open letter critical of commissioner Klein. Philosopher Susan Neiman asked Klein if Hannah Arendt and Albert Einstein would be able to lecture at publicly funded institutions in present-day Germany, given that both had signed an open letter in 1948 calling Israeli violence "fascist"; Klein responded that such comparisons are not permitted („nicht zulässig“) and similar to right-wing coronavirus deniers comparing themselves to Anne Frank.

Charlotte Wiedemann has described Staatsräson thought as authoritarian and comfortable, "a kind of national sofa for the educated classes. It allows an inertia of the heart and mind, it allows one to feel morally superior while avoiding burning questions of humanity. This has created a mentality of wilful ignorance: as if there is a special German right not to know – not to know what exactly is going on in Israel, Gaza or the West Bank, or how dangerous Israel's radical right wing actually is." Martin Shaw has said that "anti-antisemitism" was made "a state religion" by Germany's political classes in 2023 after the beginning of the Gaza war. Hannah C. Tzuberi argues that in Germany, anti-antisemitism can go beyond the identification of Germans with Jews because it can even include the identification of Germans as Jews and the identification of Germany as Israel.

In 2024, the Conference of European Rabbis awarded Federal Commissioner Klein the Moshe Rosen Prize for his work. Volker Beck, president of the German–Israeli Society, and Josef Schuster, president of the Central Council of Jews in Germany, welcomed the joint November 2024 draft resolution by the coalition parties of Germany's government aimed at "protecting, preserving, and strengthening Jewish life in Germany".

In June 2025, the Council of Europe called for freedom of expression to be respected in Germany in connection with the Gaza war. In a letter to German Interior Minister Alexander Dobrindt, Human Rights Commissioner Michael O'Flaherty expressed concern about "excessive use of force by police against protesters, including minors" and other restrictions and warned against misuse of the IHRA antisemitism definition "to stifle freedom of expression and legitimate criticism, including of the state of Israel".

== See also ==
- Opposition to antisemitism
- Philosemitism
- Anti-Nazism
- German collective guilt
- Jewish anti-racism
- Reparations Agreement between Israel and the Federal Republic of Germany
- Activist deportations from Germany
