= Censorship of pro-Palestinian expression in German culture =

Censorship of pro-Palestinian expression in Germany refers to restrictions on speech, employment, and cultural participation related to expressions of solidarity with Palestinians, particularly in the context of debates around Israel, Gaza, and the Boycott, Divestment and Sanctions movement. Critics have described these measures as resembling forms of political repression seen during the McCarthy era in the United States.

With accusations of antisemitism as the justification (thereby conflating criticism of Israel with actual antisemitism), the resulting economic and cultural sanctions on individual artists in Germany have been described by critics and cultural organisations as having increased over the past decade, particularly in relation to political expression concerning Israel and Palestine.

German cultural institutions have cancelled exhibitions, withdrawn funding from artists and cost artists and academics their jobs. Hundreds of events have been cancelled across Germany, and there has been ongoing public and academic debate regarding freedom of expression, cultural policy, and the conditions attached to public funding in Germany’s cultural sector.

== Background ==
Intergovernmental Germany–Israel relations are grounded in the legacy of the Holocaust. In 2019, the Bundestag adopted a non-binding resolution declaring the Boycott, Divestment and Sanctions (BDS) movement to be antisemitic. In 2021, the federal government formally endorsed the non-legally binding IHRA working definition of antisemitism.

A 2022 survey showed that only 27% of Germans believe that Germany has a "special responsibility" towards Israel and that 36% of Germans believe that "What the State of Israel is doing to the Palestinians today is in principle no different than what the Nazis in the Third Reich did to the Jews". In 2023 German government officials repeated their claim that the security and existence of Israel is Germany's "Staatsräson" (reason of state).

Critics argue that the application of this definition in cultural and academic contexts has blurred the line between antisemitism and legitimate criticism of Israeli government policy (constituting the weaponization of antisemitism), contributing to restrictions on pro-Palestinian expression and economic punishments for those who do so.

Debates on Jewish identity itself in Germany have been sparked by the censoring of many Jewish voices critical of Israel.

Jewish artists Candice Breitz, Adam Broomberg, Nan Goldin, Masha Gessen, Yuval Abraham and Deborah Feldman have all been subject to deplatforming as a result of their criticism of Israel, underlying the German government's willingness to conflate political criticism of Israel with antisemitism, creating legal and cultural tensions.

== Notable Cases ==
=== Berlin Culture Workers For Palestine ===
In October 2023, German cultural workers signed an open letter protesting what they described as censorship of pro-Palestinian views. The open letter cited cases involving the exclusion of Palestinian voices from literary and artistic programs.

=== Nan Goldin exhibition ===
In November 2024, the Jewish American photographer Nan Goldin made critical remarks during the opening of her retrospective at Berlin's Neue Nationalgalerie, describing Israeli actions in Gaza as "genocide". She also criticized what she described as constraints on pro-Palestinian expression in Germany. The museum later issued a statement distancing itself from the comments.

=== Adam Broomberg resignation ===
In December 2024, the Jewish South African artist Adam Broomberg resigned from his position at the Karlsruhe University of Arts and Design following public criticism of his stance on Israel and Palestine. Accusations of antisemitism were made by some groups, while Broomberg defended his statements as anti-occupation and grounded in his Jewish identity.

=== Frankfurt Book Fair ===
In October 2023, the Frankfurt Book Fair postponed an award ceremony for Palestinian author Adania Shibli, citing concerns following the October 7 attacks. Over 600 writers responded by signing an open letter describing it as an act of censorship.

== Symbol and slogan restrictions ==
Authorities in several German cities (including Berlin, Hamburg and Frankfurt) have restricted the public display of Palestinian symbols, including the flag and the slogan "from the river to the sea", citing public order concerns and potential incitement. In some cases, courts have overturned the restrictions, ruling them disproportionate. Human rights organizations, including Amnesty International, have criticized the measures as infringing on protected forms of expression.

== International reactions ==
PEN International and Human Rights Watch have expressed concern that Germany's policies could have a chilling effect on artistic and political expression. The United Nations Special Rapporteur on the promotion and protection of the right to freedom of opinion and expression raised similar concerns in a 2024 report to the Human Rights Council.

From the United States, ARTNews reported in April 2024 that "Germany's art scene is tearing itself apart", undermining the integrity of Germany's entire cultural scene due to the majority of funding for the arts coming from the Government.

== See also ==
- German support for Israel in the Gaza war
- Cultural discourse about the Gaza genocide
- Anti-BDS laws
