= Ivan Kalmar =

Canadian anthropologist

- Born: February 13, 1948 (age 78); Prague, Czech Republic

Academic background
- Education: University of Pennsylvania (BA); University of Toronto (MA, PhD)

Academic work
- Discipline: Anthropology
- Sub-discipline: Political anthropology, linguistic anthropology
- Institutions: University of Toronto
- Main interests: Illiberalism, populism, antisemitism, Islamophobia, orientalism
- Notable works: White But Not Quite (2022); Orientalism and the Jews (2005)

Ivan Kalmar (born February 13, 1948) is a Canadian anthropologist. He is a professor in the Department of Anthropology and the Munk School of Global Affairs and Public Policy at the University of Toronto, and a fellow of Victoria College.

== Early life and education ==
Soon after Kalmar was born in Prague, his family moved to Komárno, and later to Bratislava. When he was seventeen, he left what was then Czechoslovakia, and eventually arrived in the United States. His family settled in Philadelphia.

Kalmar attended the University of Pennsylvania, where he received his undergraduate degree. He subsequently moved to Toronto, where he received both a master's degree and a PhD in anthropology from the University of Toronto.

== Career and research ==
=== Language and culture ===
Kalmar's early research focused on the Inuit language (Inuktitut), specifically the grammatical phenomenon of ergativity. He argued that this grammatical structure reflected a worldview in which non-human elements of the landscape were endowed with agency. His 1977 study of ergativity continues to be cited in the scholarly literature, including in the Oxford Handbook of Ergativity.

=== Orientalism, antisemitism, and Islamophobia ===
His 1993 book The Trotskys, Freuds, and Woody Allens: Portrait of a Culture (Viking/Penguin) explored how modern Jewish intellectuals engaged with Western Christian images of Jewish otherness. From this project grew Kalmar's work on orientalism, antisemitism, and Islamophobia, beginning with his 2001 essay on "Moorish style" synagogue architecture and leading to the co-edited volume Orientalism and the Jews (2005, with Derek J. Penslar). Reviewers in the American Historical Review described the collection as a productive engagement between Jewish studies and postcolonial scholarship.

His 2012 monograph Early Orientalism: Imagined Islam and the Notion of Sublime Power (Routledge) examined the Western Christian imagination of Islam from the medieval period onward. Reviewing the book in the American Historical Review, Margaret Meserve (University of Notre Dame) called "the emphasis on theology undeniably important and the hypothesis of Allah as the West's 'Obscene Father' enormously stimulating," while praising the chapters on the seventeenth and eighteenth centuries for their "rich and provocative close readings." In the English Historical Review, Robert Irwin was more critical of the book's structure but acknowledged that Kalmar "surely rightly" emphasized the religious dimensions of orientalism that Said had treated in "excessively secular" terms.

=== Illiberalism and peripheralization ===
Since 2016, Kalmar's research has focused on illiberalism and populism in the European Union, with particular attention to its eastern flank of formerly communist member states. During the 2015 European migration crisis, when the Visegrád countries refused EU refugee quotas, Kalmar argued that their stance should be understood not as a legacy of fascism or communism, but as a response to the way Western capital had penetrated and restructured formerly communist Central Europe after 1989, turning the region into a periphery within Western-dominated networks of capital accumulation.

This analysis was developed at length in his 2022 monograph White But Not Quite: Central Europe's Illiberal Revolt (Bristol University Press), which introduced the concept of "partial privilege" to describe the position of social strata and regions located near, but not at, the margins of global capital accumulation. The book argues that illiberalism in Central Europe is not a regional anomaly but part of a broader global pattern of political reaction among such partially privileged groups.

White But Not Quite was described in a review essay in Slavic Review as a "landmark study" and a "groundbreaking intervention" that "sets the terms" for subsequent scholarship on race in Central and Eastern Europe. The book was the subject of a Book Forum in the Czech Journal of International Relations, with contributions by Aliaksei Kazharski (Charles University), Daria Krivonos, Stephanie Rudwick, and Gábor Scheiring (Georgetown University), followed by Kalmar's rejoinder. Contributors praised the book's theoretical originality but also raised critical objections; Rudwick, writing from the perspective of African Studies, argued that the framework has limited explanatory power outside the European context and that its account of racialization underestimates the global significance of phenotype and colorism. A separate review symposium appeared in Cultural Sociology. The book was also reviewed in Connections: A Journal for Historians and Area Specialists by Juraj Marušiak of the Slovak Academy of Sciences.

The Czech translation of the book was named one of the top nonfiction titles of 2024 by the Czech intellectual periodical Alarm. The book has also been translated into Japanese and published by Sairyūsha. A German edition, Weiß, aber nicht ganz: Die illiberale Revolte in der Mitte Europas, is forthcoming from Picus Verlag (Vienna) in March 2026.

In September 2024, Kalmar was invited to speak at the opening roundtable of the conference "Anti-Eastern European Racism: Do We Need an 'Eastern Enlargement' of the Racism Debate?", co-organized by Germany's Federal Anti-Discrimination Agency (Antidiskriminierungsstelle des Bundes) in Berlin. His presentation, "Peripheral Racisms," opened the first substantive session, following the official welcome by Ferda Ataman, Germany's Independent Federal Anti-Discrimination Commissioner.

Kalmar has also co-edited Racism in Contemporary Germany: Islamophobia in East and West (Routledge, 2022, with Nitzan Shoshan) and guest-edited or co-edited special issues of Patterns of Prejudice (2018), Journal of Contemporary European Studies (2020, with Nitzan Shoshan), and Journal of Ethnic and Migration Studies (2023, with Aleksandra Lewicki).

His research has been supported by multiple grants from the Social Sciences and Humanities Research Council of Canada (SSHRC), including a five-year grant (2023–2028) for the project "Illiberal Discourses at the Periphery: The East and South of the European Union," which examines field sites in Estonia, the Czech Republic, Slovakia, Slovenia, Greece, Italy, and Spain.

== Personal life ==
Kalmar is married to Diane Davidson. Their son, Daniel Davidson-Kalmar, was born in 1993. He also has an older son, Ethan de Jonge-Kalmar (born 1980), from his previous marriage to Elizabeth de Jonge.

Kalmar is a polyglot, with reading knowledge of more than ten languages and speaking ability in several of them. He is an avid amateur long-distance runner. At the 2025 TCS Toronto Waterfront Marathon, he was the oldest male finisher and the winner of the men's 75–79 age group.

== Selected publications ==
=== Books ===
- The Trotskys, Freuds, and Woody Allens: Portrait of a Culture. New York: Viking Press, 1993.
- Orientalism and the Jews. Ed. by Ivan Davidson Kalmar and Derek J. Penslar. Waltham, MA: Brandeis University Press, 2005.
- Early Orientalism: Imagined Islam and the Notion of Sublime Power. London and New York: Routledge, 2012. ISBN 9780203154809
- White But Not Quite: Central Europe's Illiberal Revolt. Bristol: Bristol University Press, 2022. ISBN 978-1-5292-1362-1
- Racism in Contemporary Germany: Islamophobia in East and West. Ed. by Ivan Kalmar and Nitzan Shoshan. London and New York: Routledge, 2022.

=== Selected journal articles and book chapters ===
- "The Origins of the 'Spanish Synagogue' of Prague." Judaica Bohemiae 35 (1999): 158–209.
- "Moorish Style: Orientalism, the Jews, and Synagogue Architecture." Jewish Social Studies: History, Culture, and Society 7.3 (2001): 68–100.
- "Benjamin Disraeli: Romantic Orientalist." Comparative Studies in Society and History 47.2 (2005): 348–371.
- "Islamophobia and Anti-Anti-Semitism: The Case of Hungary and the 'Soros Plot'." Patterns of Prejudice 60.1 (2020): 1–18.
- "The East is Just Like the West, Only More So: Islamophobia and Populism in Eastern Germany and the East of the European Union." Journal of Contemporary European Studies 28.1 (2020): 15–29.
- "Race, Racialisation, and the East of the European Union: An Introduction." Journal of Ethnic and Migration Studies 49.6 (2023): 1465–80.

=== Guest-edited special issues ===
- "Islamophobia in the East of the European Union." Patterns of Prejudice (2018).
- "Islamophobia in Germany: East and West." Journal of Contemporary European Studies 28.1 (2020), with Nitzan Shoshan.
- "Race, Racialization, and the East of the European Union." Journal of Ethnic and Migration Studies 49.6 (2023), with Aleksandra Lewicki.
