= German support for Israel in the Gaza war =

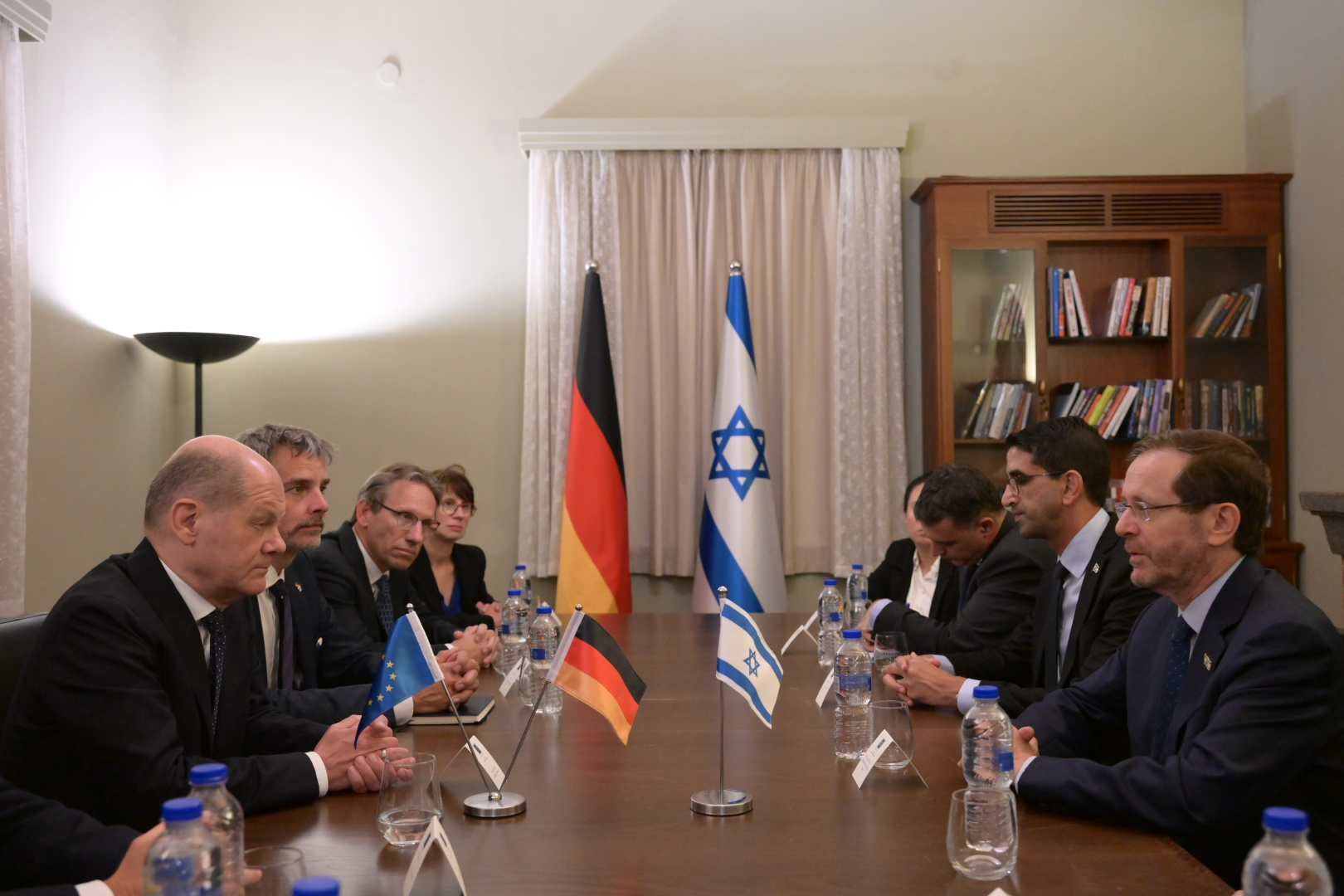
German Chancellor Olaf Scholz with Israeli President Isaac Herzog in Tel Aviv, Israel, 17 October 2023

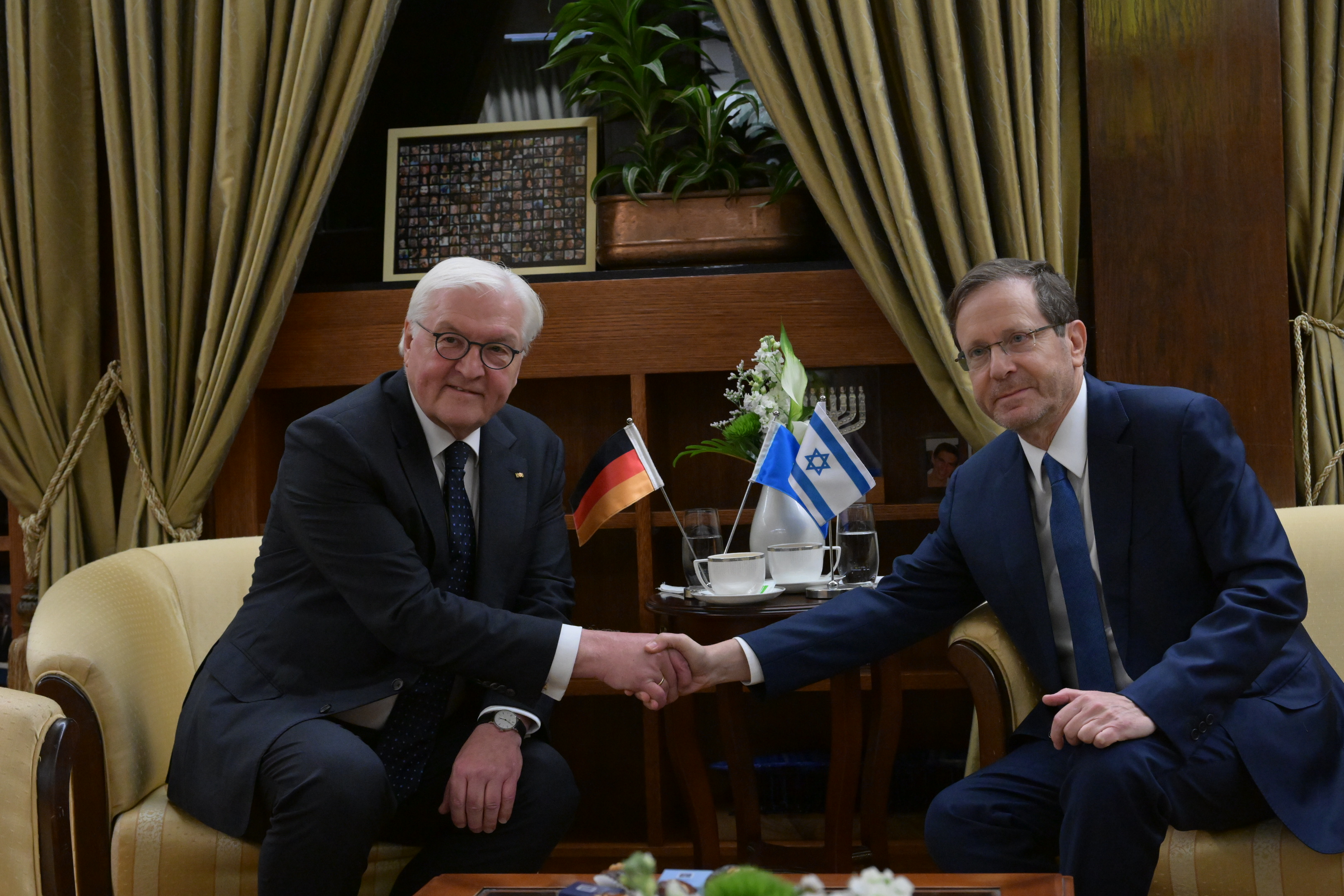
German President Frank-Walter Steinmeier with Israeli President Herzog in Jerusalem, 26 November 2023

During the Gaza war, which began in October 2023, the German government's support for Israel has attracted significant media attention and commentary.

On 1 March 2024, Nicaragua initiated proceedings against Germany at the International Court of Justice (ICJ), accusing Germany of facilitating a genocide in Gaza, in violation of the Genocide Convention. On 8 August 2025, after the Israeli Cabinet announced plans to occupy all of Gaza, German chancellor Friedrich Merz stated that Germany would be pausing weapon sales to Israel.

== Background ==
On 7 October 2023, Palestinian militants in the Gaza Strip led by Islamic movement Hamas attacked Israel, resulting in the deaths of almost 1200 Israeli citizens, including 800 civilians, and taking 250 hostages. Following the attack, Israel launched an invasion of Gaza, which has resulted in the deaths of at least 45,000 Gazans, as of December 2024.

== Government position ==
On 17 October 2024, German Chancellor Olaf Scholz visited Israel, stating that "German history and our responsibility arising from the Holocaust make it our duty to stand up for the existence and security of the State of Israel." On 12 October 2024, Scholz stated that "there is only one place for Germany: alongside Israel," repeating that "Israel's security is a 'reason of state' for Germany."

On the first anniversary of the 7 October attacks, President Frank-Walter Steinmeier gave a speech saying it was "a watershed moment, a profound trauma for Jews not only in Israel, but throughout the world," and warned "us Germans in particular against any heedless condemnation of Israel."

The German government has consistently denied that a genocide is taking place in Gaza. In December 2024, after Amnesty International released a report accusing Israel of genocide, Ministry of Foreign Affairs spokesperson Sebastian Fischer stated that "genocide presupposes a clear intention to eradicate an ethnic group. I still do not recognize any such clear intention."

In early December 2025, Merz visited Israel and met with Prime Minister Benjamin Netanyahu and President Isaac Herzog. The discussions focused on solidifying German support for Israel, the ongoing Gaza conflict, the peace process, and a major arms deal.

== Foreign policy ==
=== Human rights funding ===
Following the 7 October attacks, the German government has cut funding for at least six Palestinian NGOs. In January 2025, the German government cut its funding for Israeli NGOs Zochrot, which works to raise awareness of the Nakba, and New Profile, a feminist group that works against military conscription.

=== United Nations ===
On 27 October 2023, Germany abstained on a United Nations General Assembly vote calling for a ceasefire in Gaza, citing the fact that the motion did not include a condemnation of the 7 October attack. Germany again abstained on a UN General Assembly motion calling for a ceasefire on 12 December 2023.

=== Weapons exports ===
According to the Stockholm International Peace Research Institute, Germany accounted for 30% of weapons imports into Israel between 2019 and 2023. The amounts of German arms exports towards Israel initially rose sharply in the last months of 2023, following the 7 October attack. In the first half of 2024, however, German arms exports towards Israel significantly decreased. From August to October 2024, the German government authorised 94 million euros worth of arms exports to Israel.

In October 2024, the European Legal Support Center filed a petition in German court requesting that a 150-metric-ton shipment of military-grade explosives be blocked from being sent from Vietnam to Israel on the German cargo ship MV Kathrin, as they could potentially be used for war crimes and crimes against humanity in the Gaza Strip.

In September 2024, a Reuters report found that arms exports to Israel from Germany had slowed in 2024, due to legal challenges. In October 2024, however, data from the German Foreign Ministry showed it had authorized $100 million in military exports in the prior three months.

German companies Rheinmetall, Renk, MTU Friedrichshafen and ThyssenKrupp exported weapons used by Israel in the Gaza War.

On 8 August 2025, Chancellor Friedrich Merz announced that Germany won't authorize any exports of military equipment to Israel that could be used in Gaza “until further notice” in response to the decision by Prime Minister Netanyahu's Cabinet to take over Gaza City. An arms transfer analyst said that Germany is “openly admitting that it is uncomfortable with Israel’s actions and limiting some arms transfers, and for Germany this is a huge deal.” Merz's decision was criticized by some German politicians. In November 2025, the German government lifted export restrictions on weapons for use in Gaza.

== Domestic policies ==
In February 2024, a criminal complaint was filed in German courts accusing various senior politicians of complicity in genocide.

Accusing Israel of committing a genocide is not illegal in Germany. According to the Berlin police, using the word "genocide" in combination with a generalizing statement, for example about Israelis, may be relevant under criminal law under some circumstances.

=== Changes in legislation ===
In December 2023, the state of Saxony-Anhalt amended its laws on citizenship applications, requiring all those living in the state to sign a document that they "recognise Israel’s right to exist and condemn any efforts directed against the existence of the State of Israel." In 2024, the federal government amended its law on citizenship to add questions about the right of the State of Israel to exist in the mandatory test to gain citizenship.

In June 2024, the federal government passed a law requiring all projects applying for public grants to adopt the IHRA definition of antisemitism, recognise the right of the State of Israel to exist, and not participate in the Boycott, Divestment, Sanctions movement.

== Political parties and organisations ==
=== Political parties ===
Left-wing party Die Linke has faced significant internal turmoil over its stance on the Gaza war. Former Die Linke MP Christine Buchholz has accused the party of "failing to adequately respond to one of the central political conflicts – the protests against the war in Gaza and the ongoing disenfranchisement and dehumanisation of Palestinians by the State of Israel, with the German government at its side."

=== Organisations ===
In August 2023, the Heinrich Böll Foundation (HBS) announced that Jewish-American author Masha Gessen was the winner of the Hannah Arendt Prize for Political Thought. In December 2023, days before the award was due to be presented, the HBS said it was withdrawing its support because it objected to an essay by Gessen on Israel's war in Gaza, published in The New Yorker on 9 December, which compared Gaza to Nazi-era Jewish ghettos.

== Protests ==
=== Anti-war protests ===
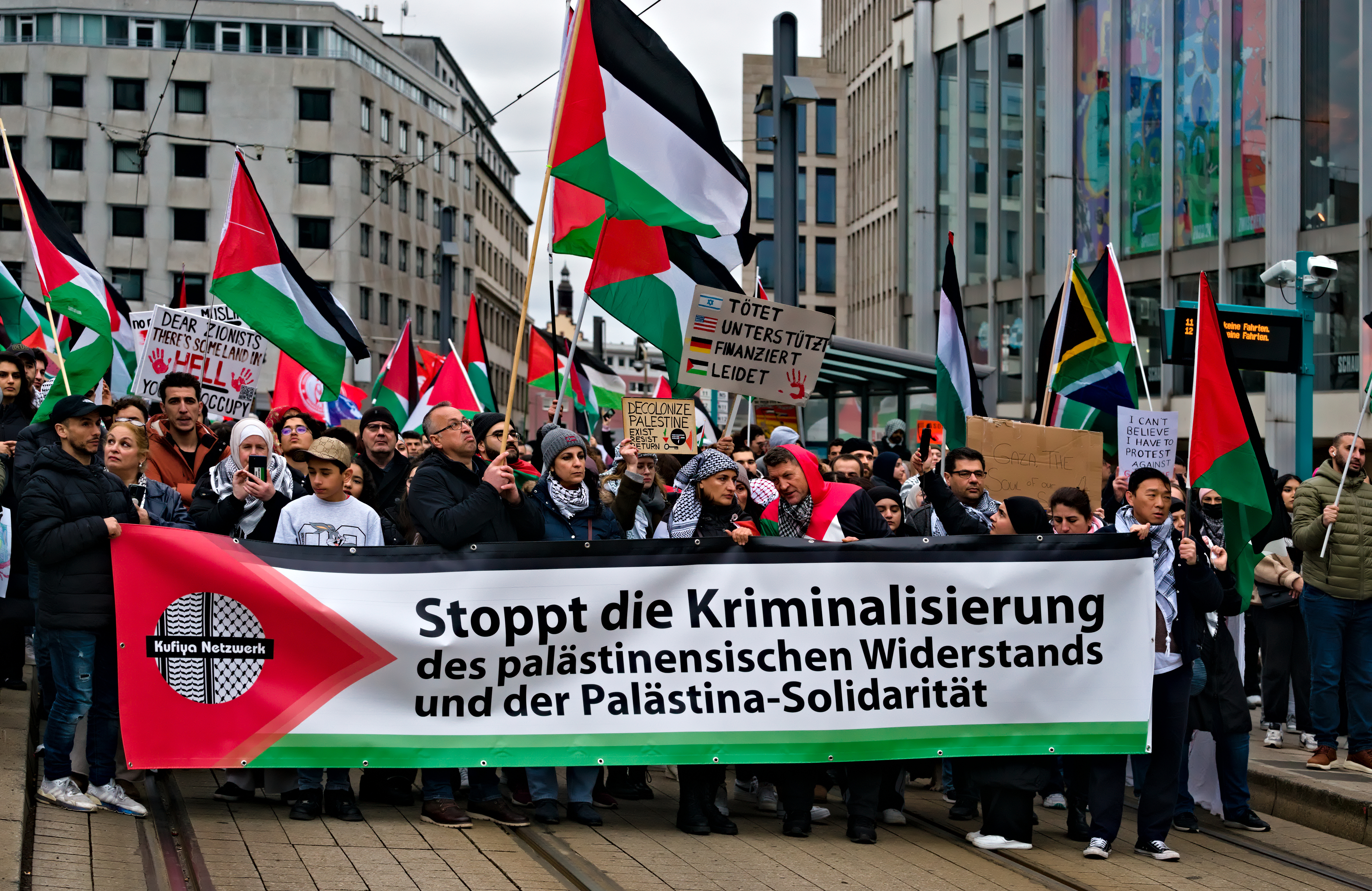
Pro-Palestinian protestors in Frankfurt, 2024. The banner states, "Stop the criminalization of the Palestinian resistance and Palestine solidarity". In the background: "Israel kills, America supports, Germany finances, Palestine suffers".

A number of student protests against the Gaza war have been held in Germany since the start of the war. The police response to the protests has attracted some controversy, with students alleging attacks on academic freedom, free speech, and incidents of police brutality.

In Berlin, Frankfurt and other German cities, authorities banned pro-Palestinian rallies.

In June 2024, the German public news station NDR revealed that under Bettina Stark-Watzinger's leadership, the Ministry of Education and Research requested investigations into whether the ministry could strip funding from signatories of an open letter criticising the management of Freie Universität Berlin of its behaviour concerning students who had participated in a pro-Palestinian protest camp. The signatories did not comment on the situation in Israel, but pointed out the right to peaceful protest, freedom of assembly and freedom of expression.

== Reactions ==
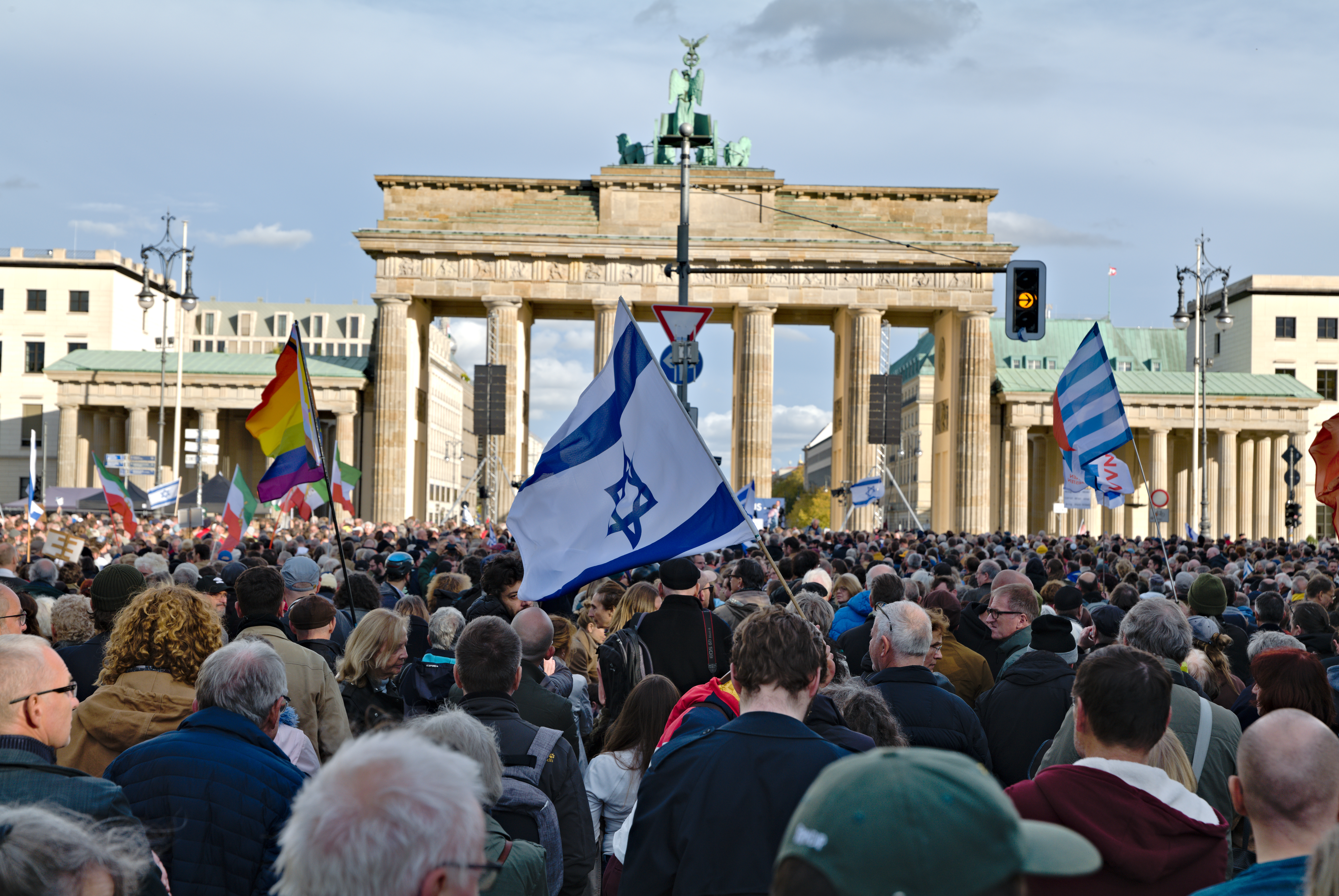
Pro-Israel protest in Berlin on 22 October 2023

=== In Germany ===
Die Linke MP Nicole Gohlke has argued that "the Palestinian people’s suffering appears to be of no interest to the political establishment in Germany."

On 12 November 2023, German Chancellor Olaf Scholz rejected calls for "an immediate ceasefire or long pause" in Israel's war against Hamas in Gaza, saying it would "mean ultimately that Israel leaves Hamas the possibility of recovering and obtaining new missiles". In March 2024, Scholz confronted EU foreign policy chief Josep Borrell over his months-long criticism of Israel, saying Borrell did not speak for Germany.

In October 2024, CDU leader Friedrich Merz successfully urged the German government to resume weapons deliveries to Israel, including spare parts for tanks. He proposed stripping people with dual citizenship of their German citizenship for protesting against Israel. Merz criticised the International Criminal Court's (ICC) decision to issue an arrest warrant for Israeli Prime Minister Benjamin Netanyahu for alleged war crimes during the Gaza war. In February 2025, one day after the 2025 German federal election, he announced his intention to invite Netanyahu to Germany, "as an open challenge" to the decision of the ICC.

On 11 January 2024, while visiting Sderot near the Gaza strip, German Vice-Chancellor Robert Habeck called the lawsuit South Africa v. Israel (Genocide Convention) to be one of the biggest absurdities ("eine der größten Absurditäten") one could come up with.

On 23 October 2023, German Foreign Minister Annalena Baerbock blocked a declaration by EU ministers calling for "an immediate humanitarian cease-fire" to help civilians in the Gaza Strip. Francesca Albanese, incumbent UN Special Rapporteur on the occupied Palestinian territories, criticised Baerbock following a speech by the Foreign Minister in the German Bundestag on 7 October 2024, in which Baerbock alluded to Israeli attacks on Palestinian civilian sites as "self-defense" and said that "that's what Germany stands for" to much applause.

In 2024, the co-leader of the far-right AfD, Tino Chrupalla, criticized what he considered to be "exclusive declarations of solidarity" and "one-sided partisanship" with regards to Israel and called for a stop on both German arms exports and "blanket Islamophobia". This drew criticism from some other members of the AfD parliamentary group, suggesting a continued internal divide on the issue.

According to a poll by the German Forsa Institute on behalf of the newspaper Die Welt conducted in December 2023, 45% of respondents in Germany agreed and 43% disagreed with the statement: "Israel's military action in the Gaza Strip is all in all appropriate." In the immediate aftermath of the Hamas attack on Israel, 44% of Germans said Germany has "a special obligation towards Israel." In December 2023, that number dropped to 37%.

=== Abroad ===
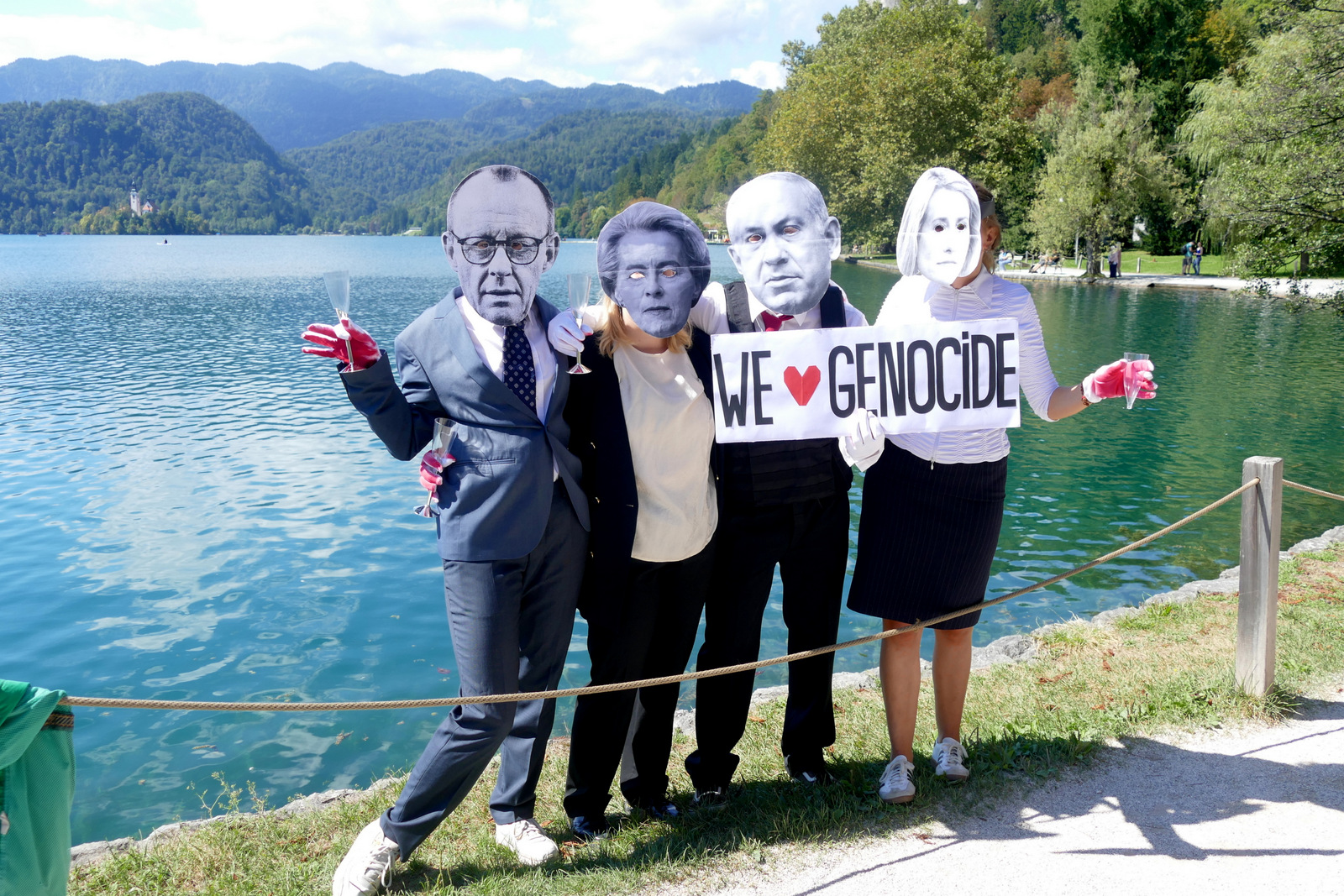
Demonstration in Slovenia against German Chancellor Friedrich Merz, European Union Foreign Affairs Representative Kaja Kallas and European Commission President Ursula von der Leyen, accused of promoting the Gaza genocide, 1 September 2025

In January 2024, President Hage Geingob of Namibia called Israel's actions in Gaza "genocidal and gruesome" and sharply criticized Germany's decision to back Israel in South Africa v. Israel, saying that Germany had an "inability to draw lessons from its horrific history".

On 1 March 2024, Nicaragua initiated proceedings against Germany at the ICJ under the Genocide Convention, concerning Germany's support for Israel in the Gaza war.

In August 2025, over 100 Israeli academics have written a letter warning that if Germany does not pressure Israel, it could result in further Israeli war crimes in Gaza.

In January 2026, the Lemkin Institute for Genocide Prevention wrote that German civil society has perpetuated Gaza genocide denial. They called on "public authorities in Germany to immediately halt all active financing, dissemination, and legitimation of genocide denialist propaganda masked as critical expertise."

== See also ==
- Censorship of pro-Palestinian expression in German culture
- Germany and the Armenian genocide
