= Derek Penslar =

Canadian historian

Derek Jonathan Penslar, FRSC (born 1958) is an American-Canadian comparative historian with interests in the relationship between modern Israel and diaspora Jewish societies, global nationalist movements, European colonialism, and post-colonial states.

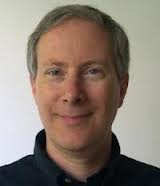
Derek Penslar, 2014

He was raised in Los Angeles, attended Stanford University for his undergraduate degree. He took his PhD in history at the University of California at Berkeley, where his advisors were Richard Webster, Amos Funkenstein, and Gerald Feldman. Penslar taught at Indiana University in Bloomington from 1987 to 1998, when he moved to Toronto to assume the Samuel J. Zacks Chair in Jewish History at the University of Toronto. In 2011, he was made a Fellow of the Royal Society of Canada.

From 2012 to 2016, he was the inaugural holder of the Stanley Lewis Chair of Israel Studies at the University of Oxford in England. He was a member of the Department of Politics and International Relations and the School of Interdisciplinary Area Studies and a fellow of St Anne's College, where he continues to be an honorary fellow. In 2016, he moved to Harvard University, where he is William Lee Frost Professor of Jewish History and a resident faculty member at the Minda de Gunzburg Center for European Studies. Penslar serves as director of the Center for Jewish Studies at Harvard University.

On January 19, 2024, Penslar was appointed by Harvard's Interim President, Alan Garber, to co-chair Harvard's Presidential Task Force on Combating Antisemitism. Critics including Bill Ackman and Lawrence Summers objected because he was among the 2,898 Jewish "scholars, clergy, and other public figures" who signed an open letter against Benjamin Netanyahu's efforts at judicial reforms in August 2023, which included the passage: "Israel’s long-standing occupation [...] has yielded a regime of apartheid." Especially after Congresswoman Elise Stefanik thus attacked Penslar for “despicable antisemitic views,” Jewish students and colleagues questioned the basis of these accusations and responded by stressing his reputation as a knowledgeable and balanced scholar; these responses included a statement by the American Academy of Jewish Research; a letter signed by 200 scholars of Jewish Studies and Israel Studies from Israel, North American, and Europe; and a letter from current and former students of Penslar “arguing that ‘his measured and thorough analysis of Jewish history and Zionism’ makes him uniquely positioned to effectively lead Harvard’s efforts against antisemitism.” One opinion editorial described him as "a deeply committed Jew and outstanding scholar who is widely known and respected for his judicious, kindly and unfailingly balanced nature," speculating that the case was attracting so much media attention because of fears that "what they are attacking is not just an eminent scholar, but more broadly, the American university as the site of expertise and critical thinking."

== Books ==
- Zionism and Technocracy: The Engineering of Jewish Settlement in Palestine, 1870-1918 (1991, Hebrew version 2001)
- In Search of Jewish Community: Jewish Identities in Germany and Austria, 1918-1933 (co-edited with Michael Brenner, 1998)
- Shylock's Children: Economics and Jewish Identity in Modern Europe (2001)
- Orientalism and the Jews (co-edited with Ivan Kalmar, 2004)
- Contemporary Antisemitism: Canada and the World (co-edited with Michael Marrus and Janice Gross Stein, 2005)
- Israel in History: The Jewish State in Comparative Perspective (2006)
- Israël face à son passé, with Shlomo Sand, Avi Shlaïm, Les éditions arkhê, 2010
- The Origins of Israel 1882-1948: A Documentary History (co-edited with Eran Kaplan, 2011)
- Jews and the Military: A History (2013)
- Theodor Herzl: The Charismatic Leader (2020)
- Zionism: An Emotional State (2023), National Jewish Book Award Finalist
- Unacknowledged Kinships: Postcolonial Studies and the Historiography of Zionism (co-edited with Stefan Vogt and Arieh Saposnik, 2023)
