= Felix Klein (German antisemitism commissioner) =

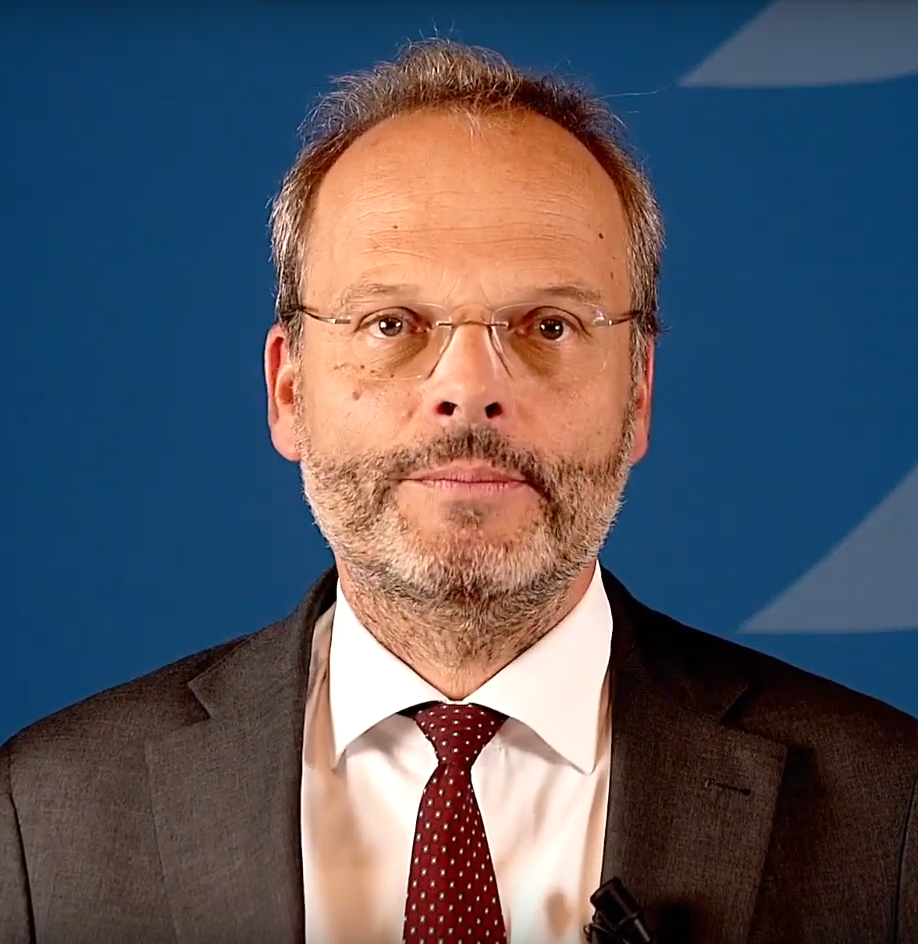
Klein in 2022

Felix Klein (born 1968, Darmstadt) is a German government official who has served as the commissioner for combating antisemitism since 2018.

Klein earnt a Master of Public International from the London School of Economics and a doctorate from the University of St Gallen.

In early 2020, Klein called for the cancellation of a keynote address by Cameroonian historian and Achille Mbembe scheduled to be delivered on 14 August that summer at the Ruhrtriennale. He claimed Mbembe had "relativised the Holocaust and denied Israel's right to exist" based on comments Mbembe made in two books where he drew parallels between the separatist policies deployed in the Israeli occupation of the Palestinian territories and South Africa under Apartheid. The invitation was withdrawn, and the festival itself was cancelled due to the COVID-19 pandemic. Mbembe was supported by groups of Israeli and Jewish academics, including some prominent German Holocaust scholars, who stated that they felt Klein had “assumed a leading role in the ‘weaponization’ of antisemitism against critics of the Israeli government”.

In 2024, the Conference of European Rabbis awarded Federal Commissioner Klein the Moshe Rosen Prize for his work.

In March 2025, he expressed support for Trump Gaza plan, calling it fundamentally positive, and adding, "I don't think it's wrong to think radically and in a completely new way." In response the Federal Ministry of the Interior stated that these were Klein's personal views not the official position of the German government. Holocaust researcher Omer Bartov stated that "If Klein is backing forcible displacement, he loses all moral authority" and "he should have been fired long ago." Israeli anti-occupation activist Yehuda Shaul said that Klein's support for the plan was "a disgrace for all victims of antisemitism".

== See also ==
- Anti-antisemitism in Germany
