= Sheila Patterson =

British social anthropologist

Sheila Patterson (née Caffyn; 30 March 1918 – 21 June 1998) was a British social anthropologist who specialised in race, immigration, and race and ethnic relations. She undertook research in South Africa, Canada, and the United Kingdom. From 1971 to 1987, she was editor of New Community (now named the Journal of Ethnic and Migration Studies), a journal published by the Community Relations Commission.

== Selected works ==
- Patterson, Sheila (1953). Colour and Culture in South Africa: A Study of the Status of the Cape Coloured People within the Social Structure of the Union of South Africa. London: Routledge and Paul.
- Patterson, Sheila (1957). The Last Trek: A Study of the Boer People and the Afrikaner Nation. London: Routledge & Kegan Paul.
- Patterson, Sheila (1963). Dark Strangers: Sociological Study of the Absorption of a Recent West Indian Migrant Group in Brixton, South London. London: Tavistock Publications. OCLC 8009327.
- Patterson, Sheila (1968). Immigrants in Industry. London: Oxford University Press.
- Patterson, Sheila (1969). Immigration and Race Relations in Britain, 1960–1967. London: Oxford University Press. ISBN 978-0192181749.
