= Matthias Goldmann =

German professor of international law

Matthias Goldmann is a professor of International Law at EBS University of Business and Law and a lecturer and senior research fellow at the Max Planck Institute for Comparative Public Law and International Law. He is known for his legal work on public finance, German colonial history and armed conflicts.

== Career ==
After studying law and European law at University of Würzburg and University of Fribourg, Goldmann was an intern at the International Criminal Tribunal for Rwanda in 2004. He then finished his second state exam in 2010, completed an LL.M. at New York University School of Law, and began his doctorate at Heidelberg University about "International Institutions and Their Instruments in the Age of Globalization".

Goldmann began working at the Max Planck Institute for Comparative Public Law and International Law in 2004, later doing legal research at the European University Institute and the University of Cambridge in 2008 and 2009 and at the London School of Economics in 2016.

He began lecturing at Heidelberg University in 2011, transferring to Goethe University Frankfurt in 2014, becoming an adjunct professor in 2016. In 2021, he became a professor at EBS University of Business and Law.

Goldmann received scholarships from Studienstiftung, the German Academic Exchange Service and the Hans Kelsen Scholarship. In 2015, he received the Freigeist-Fellowship from the Volkswagen Foundation; the prestigious fellowship awarded over 500.000 € for a five-year research project.

== Views ==
=== Fiscal policy ===
Goldmann stated in 2022 to Tagesschau that the legal status of the 200 billion euro "Doppelwumms", a government action to reduce the impact of rising energy costs, was likely to be assessed by the European Commission with the outcome being unclear.

He stated that Eurobonds issued by Mozambique would be impacted by the state guarantees for them being found illegal by its constitutional court, arguing that the replacement of the bonds in 2016 had not resolved the question of the bonds' validity.

=== Colonial history ===
He has stated that some of the German attempts to avoid accepting responsibility for its colonial past were motivated by a “grave concern that this would give rise to a rule.” He defended the return of the Benin Bronzes to the Oba of Benin by the Nigerian Government, stating that the Oba was the current leader of the group from which they were originally stolen, and that a return was therefore appropriate from a human rights perspective. He described a theory that the bronzes would no longer be accessible to the public as "dubious."

=== Armed conflicts ===
In January and April 2024, Goldmann participated in panels organized by Al Jazeera English regarding the causes of the dispute between Nicaragua and Germany and the subsequent case against Germany at the ICJ. In May 2024, along with other German academics, he signed a letter in support of the right of students to protest the Gaza war, opposing police actions as long as the protests remained non-violent. He was critical of a public statement made by Bettina Stark-Watzinger to the tabloid Bild stating that she exposed the academics to harassment by the newspaper. He stated that both the Iranian attack on Israel and the pager attack were violations of international law. In November of 2024, he argued that there was at least a risk of genocide in Gaza, referring to the ban of UNRWA as part of a pattern of conduct as required by the ICJ.
