= Never Again is Now: Protecting, Preserving and Strengthening Jewish Life in Germany =

2024 non-binding resolution

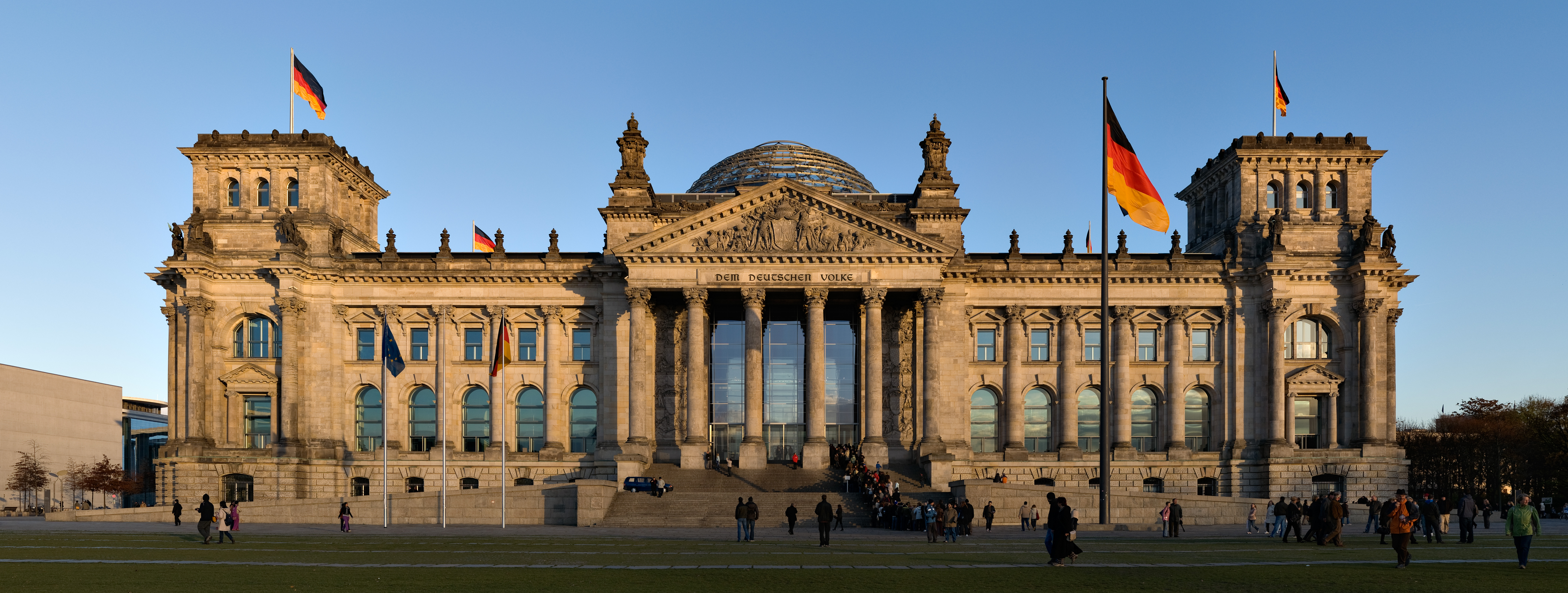

Bundestag
- Territorial extent: Germany
- Enacted: 7 November 2024
- Status: In force

Never Again is Now: Protecting, Preserving and Strengthening Jewish Life in Germany (Nie wieder ist jetzt – Jüdisches Leben in Deutschland schützen, bewahren und stärken) is a German non-binding resolution passed by the Bundestag in November 2024.

The resolution seeks to enforce public adherence to the International Holocaust Remembrance Alliance (IHRA) definition of antisemitism, which includes some forms of criticism of the State of Israel. This includes requiring public grants for culture and science projects dependent on adhering to the IHRA definition of antisemitism.

== Provisions ==
The text of the resolution includes a provision that no group that "questions the right of Israel to exist or calls for a boycott of Israel" can receive government funds.

== Legislative history ==
The resolution was passed on 7 November 2024. Only the left-wing populist Sahra Wagenknecht Alliance (BSW) voted against it, with the Left Party abstaining. MP Nina Scheer vote against the resolution, saying it "prevents the naming and addressing of possible breaches of international law and thus violates constitutional law" before the vote.

== Reaction ==
The resolution was praised by the Alternative for Germany party and Israeli government.

At the end of August 2024, an open signed by over 150 Jewish intellectuals and artists criticizing the bill was published in German newspaper taz.

On 11 November 2024, Human Rights Watch criticized the resolution in an online statement, writing that it "could negatively impact civil society and free expression in the country."

Other critics noted the text could "restrict academic and cultural liberties".

== Impact ==
Following the passage of the resolution, the German government withheld a €10,000 (£8,360) award to British artist James Bridle, who had signed an open letter promising to boycott Israeli cultural institutions. In July 2024, Bridle had been awarded the Schelling Architecture Foundation's theory prize, and in October 2024 he signed a letter that stated "we will not work with Israeli cultural institutions that are complicit or have remained silent observers of the overwhelming oppression of Palestinians". The Foundation released a statement writing that Bridle's signature on the letter was "in direct contradiction" to responsibilities from the “awareness of Germany's national history".

In a statement on ArtReview, Bridle wrote that "the far right, and the denial of genocide that accompanies it, are on the march everywhere."
