= Journal of Ethnic and Migration Studies =

- Discipline: Racial equality
- Language: English
- Edited by: Paul Statham

Publication details
- Former name(s): Community; New Community
- History: 1971–present
- Publisher: Taylor and Francis
- Frequency: 15/year

Standard abbreviations
- ISO 4: J. Ethn. Migr. Stud.

Indexing
- ISSN: 1369-183X (print); 1469-9451 (web)
- OCLC no.: 746944331

Links
- Journal homepage; Online access; Online archive

The Journal of Ethnic and Migration Studies is an academic journal published by Routledge.

According to the Journal Citation Reports, the journal had a 2018 impact factor of 2.297, ranking it 2nd out of 18 journals in the category "Ethnic Studies" and 4th out of 29 journals in the category "Demography".

== History ==
It was previously called New Community. It was first published in 1971 as the quarterly journal of the Community Relations Commission, predecessor of the U.K.’s Commission for Racial Equality. Sheila Patterson edited New Community from 1971 until 1988 when Malcolm Cross was appointed editor. In 1994 the journal was given a comparative European focus and was re-launched in 1998 with an international editorial board under its current title. In 2000 JEMS was relocated to the Centre for Migration Research at the University of Sussex when first Russell King (from 2001), and subsequently Paul Statham (from 2014), became editors.
