= Yair Wallach =

Israeli-born UK-based historian

Yair Wallach (Hebrew: יאיר וולך) is an Israeli-born, UK-based historian. He specialises in the urban history of the Middle East and is based at the University of London's School of Oriental and African Studies (SOAS), where he directs the Centre for Jewish Studies. He is also a commentator on Israel/Palestine and on antisemitism.

== Family and early life ==
Wallach's parents are Maya and Efi Wallach. He was born and raised in Jerusalem.

== Academic work ==
Wallach's website describes him as a "social and cultural historian of modern Palestine/Israel, studying the entangled and relational histories of Jews and Palestinians... focussed primarily on visual and material culture and on the urban fabric as sites and vehicles of contestation and transformation in late Ottoman and British Mandate Palestine"

He received a PhD from Birkbeck, University of London in 2008, was a post-graduate researcher at Cambridge University 2010–11, working with Wendy Pullan on the Conflict in Cities project, then a Reader at SOAS.

His book, A City in Fragments: Urban Text in Modern Jerusalem was published by Stanford University Press in 2020. It won the Association for Jewish Studies’ Jordan Schnitzer Book Prize in 2022. According to the review in the Tel Aviv Review of Books,

Far from a plain historical study, Wallach's is a documented flâneurie through Jerusalem's streets, literature, art, and photography, reading the cityscape as inherent to social change and not merely as the platform thereof. Wallach supplies an astounding account of how and why stone inscriptions were replaced by street signs and name plates; what caused ritual banners made of cloth to turn into modern national flags or paper placards; how colonial political economy was embedded within the transformation of metal coins into banknotes; why the traditional practice of engraving one's name in sacred sites came to be seen as iconoclastic graffiti; and the process in which multi-layered identities were reduced to census forms and identification papers.

According to a review in the Jerusalem Quarterly, the book is

groundbreaking in how it gives agency to items that in general have been considered accessories rather than agents of power, control, and conflict. He notes, however, that reading the texts from different perspectives can lead to disagreements with the author's interpretations. The book is an important addition to a wealth of literature on Jerusalem, but one that stands out among them by offering the possibility to look at Jerusalem from a material perspective.

In 2020–22, Wallach was a Leverhulme Trust Research Fellow, working on Ashkenazi Jewish migrants in Egypt, Palestine and Lebanon in the 19th and 20th century. He has written on Zionism for Ethnic and Racial Studies, Jewish Social Studies and other journals.

In 2020, he was falsely accused by Israel Academia Monitor, the Pinsker Center and the Simon Wiesenthal Center of boycotting Israel when SOAS moved their Hebrew language study abroad programme from Hebrew University to Haifa University. Invited in late 2023 to speak at the Birkbeck Institute for the Study of Antisemitism, he was accused in a Jerusalem Post op ed of being "an extremist who constantly accuses Israel of racism and defends anti-Israel boycotts".

== Commentary ==
Wallach has written for The Guardian, Ha'aretz, the New Statesman, +972 Magazine, World Politics Review, Jadaliyya, and Jewish News. He has appeared on the podcasts of New Lines Magazine and Jewish Currents.
