= Berlin Immigration Office =

- Landesamt für Einwanderung

Agency overview
- Type: Ausländerbehörde
- Jurisdiction: Berlin government
- Employees: 540 (as of 2020)
- Agency executive: Engelhard Mazanke, Direktor and head of the Ausländerbehörde since 2011
- Parent department: Berlin Senatsverwaltung für Inneres, Digitalisierung und Sport
- Website: berlin.de/einwanderung/en

The Berlin Immigration Office (German: Landesamt für Einwanderung, or LEA) is the state government agency responsible for immigration in Berlin. It replaced Berlin's Ausländerbehörde ("foreigners' agency") in 2020. It still functions as the Ausländerbehörde of Berlin and is the largest of all such agencies across Germany, with 540 staff and 400,000 clients per year as of 2019. In 2024 it also became responsible for naturalization and citizenship in the state of Berlin, which had previously been handled separately by each of its 12 districts.

The Berlin Immigration Office is under the stewardship of the Berlin Senate's Department for the Interior, Digitalisation and Sports.

== Foundation ==
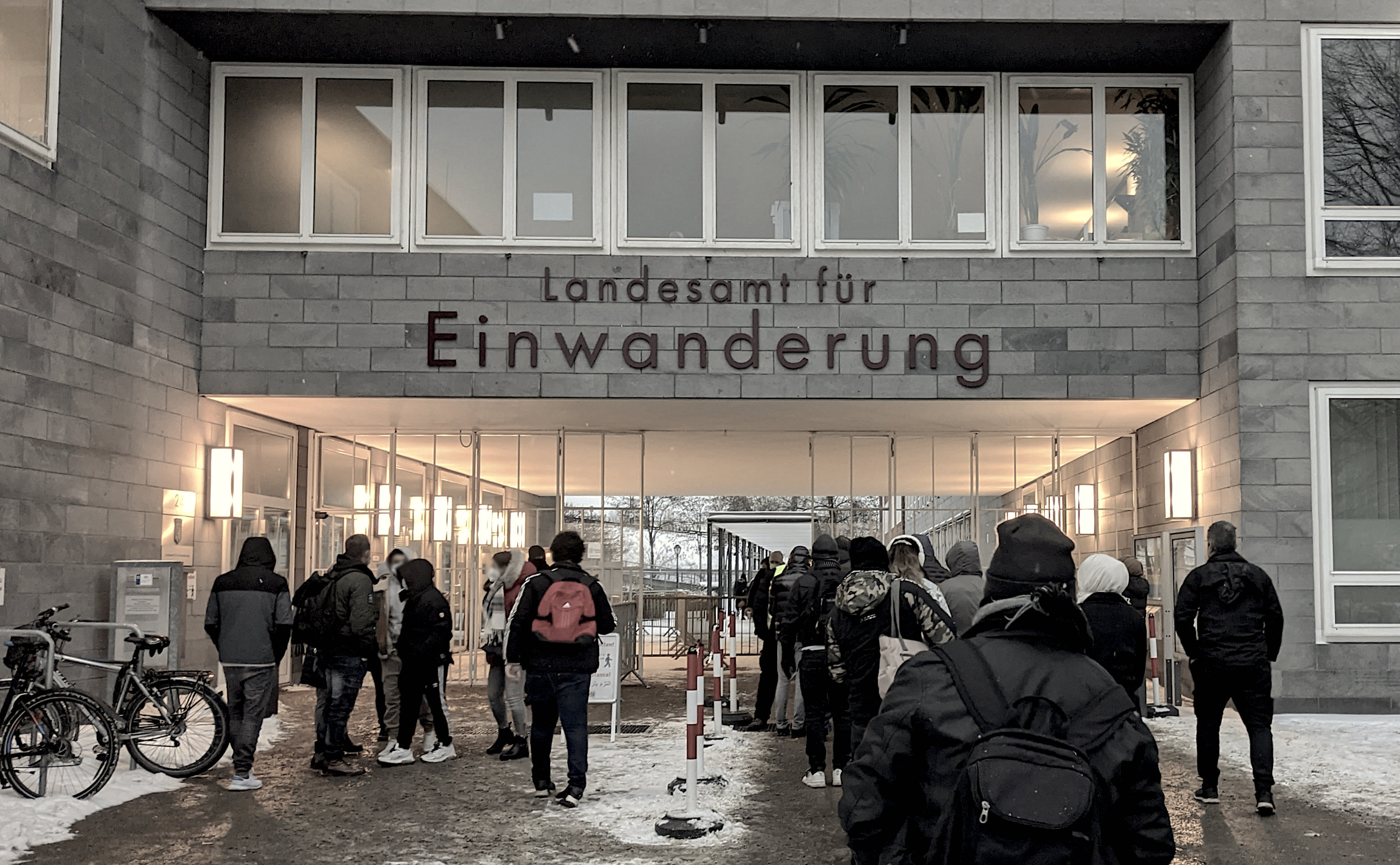
The entrance of the main building in March 2022.

The Berlin Immigration Office was founded in 2020 from the Ausländerbehörde which was until then a division of the Landesamt für Bürger- und Ordnungsangelegenheiten (LABO). The 2020 reordering gave the Ausländerbehörde independent status as a state-level Landesamt, a first among Germany's 16 states. Apart from the former Ausländerbehörde, the Berlin Immigration Office also comprises some staff members who formerly worked for the LABO. An opening ceremony took place on 15 January 2020.

The restructuring was decided in 2019 by the 2016-2021 red-green-red Berlin government coalition of Social Democrats, Greens, and The Left. The idea for an office for "immigrants" rather than "foreigners" in Berlin had been suggested by the city's Green party as early as 2014.

The renaming was criticised by a Christian Democrat opposition politician as not what immigrants needed, and by one immigrant as "lipstick on a pig".

== Responsibilities and departments ==
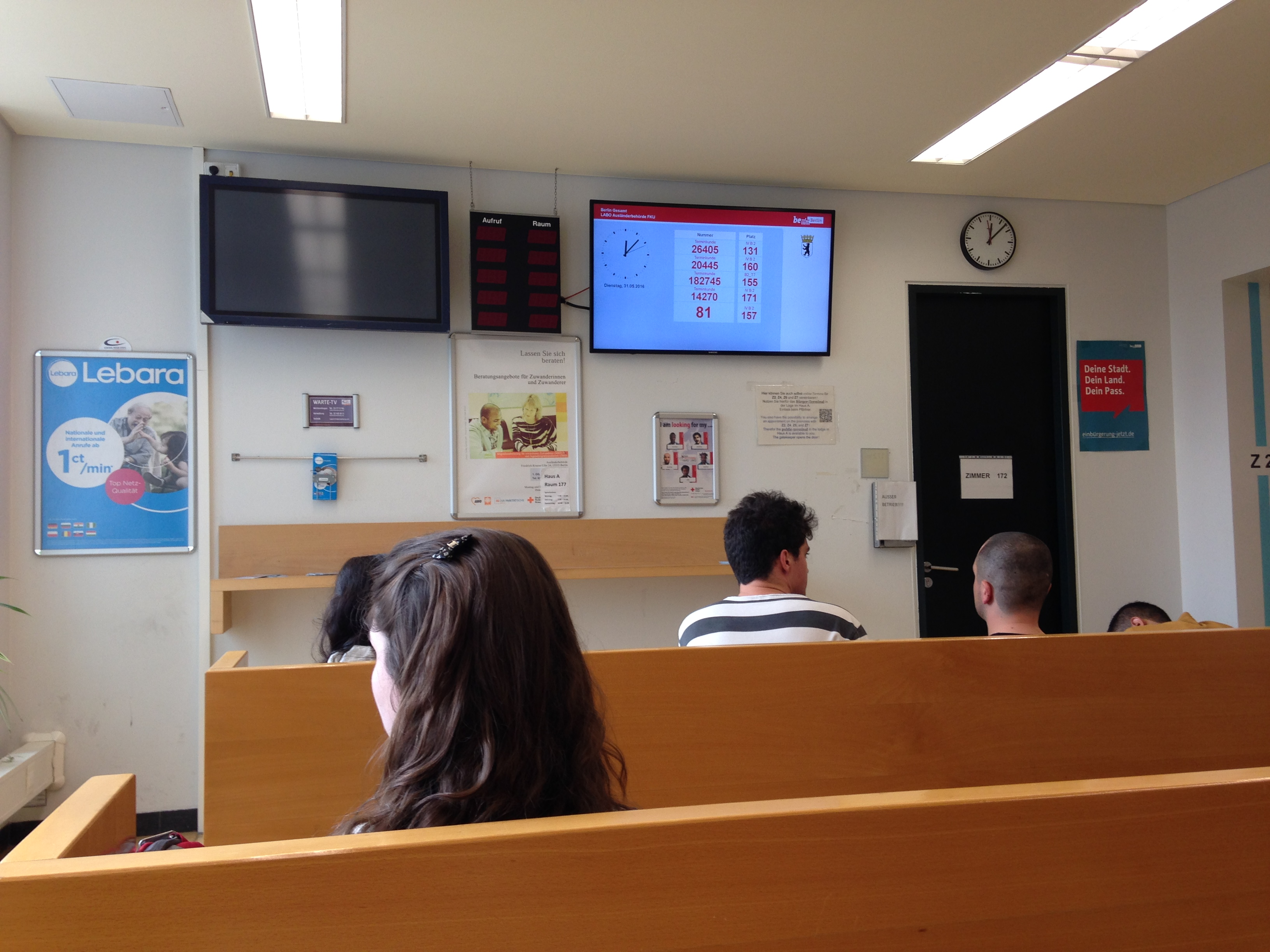
A waiting room at the Berlin Immigration Office.

The LEA is responsible for migration documents, refugees and asylum, foreign students, deportation, and as of 2024, granting German citizenship. It has seven divisions and 33 subdivisions as of 2024, compared with six divisions and 25 subdivisions as of 2021.

=== Abteilung A – Asylum ===
- A 1 – Syria: Syrian nationals and stateless persons or persons with unclear nationality from Syria (surname A – C)
- A 2 – A 4: Asylum matters and Duldung (tolerated stay): all countries (three subdivisions split by client surname, except cases from Vietnam which are all handled by A 3)
- A 5 – Syria, resettlement (all countries): Syrian nationals and stateless persons or persons with unclear nationality from Syria (surname D – Z); first issue of residence permit for all resettlement refugees

=== Abteilung B – Special tasks ===
- B 1 - B 4 – skilled workers, training and further education, school attendance, studies, science and other special purposes of residence (four alphabetical subdivisions by client surname)
  - EU Blue Card, residence permits for skilled workers, and holders' family members
  - Students, scientists, teachers and their family members
  - School attendance (including language students and exchange students), vocational training and further education, qualifications programs
- B 5 – Declaration of commitment, visa extension: Declarations of commitment for short stays with a Schengen visa and certain longer stays with a national visa; extension of Schengen visas
- B 6 – Business Immigration Service: Immigration for professionals and managers; accelerated procedure for skilled workers
- B 7 – Entry: Visa procedures from abroad

=== Abteilung E – Immigration ===
Each subdivision is responsible for a subset of countries of immigrants' citizenships:

- E 1: Afghanistan, Bahrain, Iraq, Iran Islamic Republic of, Yemen, Jordan, Qatar, Kuwait, Lebanon, Oman, Palestinian Territories, Saudi Arabia, United Arab Emirates and stateless persons or persons with unclear nationality from these countries
- E 2: Countries in Africa, North America, South America, and Israel
- E 3: Azerbaijan, Fiji, Micronesia, India, Indonesia, Kiribati, Libya, Maldives, Marshall Islands, Nauru, Northern Mariana Islands, Pakistan, Palau, Papua New Guinea, Philippines, Solomon Islands, Samoa, Tonga, Turkey, Tuvalu, Vanuatu
- E 4: Armenia, Australia, Bangladesh, Bhutan, Brunei, China, Cook Islands, Hong Kong, Japan, Cambodia, Kazakhstan, Kyrgyzstan, North Korea, South Korea, Laos, Macau, Malaysia, Moldova, Mongolia, Myanmar, Nepal, New Zealand, Niue, Russia, Singapore, Sri Lanka, Tajikistan, Taiwan, Thailand, Timor-Leste, Turkmenistan, Uzbekistan, Vietnam and stateless persons or persons with unclear nationality from these countries
- E 5: Albania, Bosnia-Herzegovina, Georgia, Kosovo, Montenegro, North Macedonia, Serbia, Ukraine, Belarus
- E 6: Andorra, Monaco, San Marino, Switzerland, UK, Vatican; EU and family members of EU and EEA citizens. This department split from E 5 in 2023.

=== Abteilung S – Citizenship ===
The citizenship affairs (Staatsangehörigkeitsangelegenheiten) division opened in January 2024 at a new building on Sellerstraße in Wedding, Berlin. On opening, it took on a backlog of 40,000 applications from Berlin's 12 districts, which had previously had responsibility for issuing German citizenship. By 15 July 2024 it had received an additional 25,000 applications. Various subdivisions deal with applicants for German citizenship depending on their current country of citizenship:

- S 1, S 2: Syria and Iraq
- S 3: Countries in Asia except Syria or Iraq
- S 4: Countries in Africa, Americas, Australia and Oceania
- S 5: Turkey, Ukraine, Poland
- S 6: Countries in Europe except Turkey, Ukraine, or Poland

=== Abteilung R – Crime and repatriation ===
- R 1, R 2, R 3, R 4

=== Abteilung G – Guiding principles and cross-sectional matters ===
- G 1, G 2, G 3, G 4

=== Abteilung P – Process and service ===
- P 1

Its service has been criticised by many users as unfriendly, German-only, and non-digitised, much like the former Ausländerbehörde.

== Sites ==
The Office has a main building at Friedrich-Krause-Ufer in Moabit and a second building at Keplerstraße in Charlottenburg, opened in 2016. Clients are directed to either of the two centres based on the type of visa or residency status they need or hold.
