= Nicaragua v. Germany =

2024 International Court of Justice case

Alleged Breaches of Certain International Obligations in Respect of the Occupied Palestinian Territory (Nicaragua v. Germany)
- Court: International Court of Justice
- Full case name: Alleged Breaches of Certain International Obligations in Respect of the Occupied Palestinian Territory (Nicaragua v. Germany)
- Started: 1 March 2024
- Claim: "Germany is facilitating the commission of genocide and, in any case has failed in its obligation to do everything possible to prevent the commission of genocide."

Keywords
- Israeli–Palestinian conflict; military occupation; public international law

Alleged Breaches of Certain International Obligations in Respect of the Occupied Palestinian Territory (Nicaragua v. Germany) is an International Court of Justice case brought by Nicaragua against Germany on 1 March 2024 under, inter alia, the Genocide Convention, arising from Germany's support for Israel in the Gaza war. It sought the indication of provisional measures of protection including the resumption of suspended German funding of the UNRWA and the cessation of military supplies to Israel.

== Background ==
Starting on 7 October, Israel began bombing the Gaza Strip in response to Palestinian attacks earlier that day; a few weeks later, Israel invaded Gaza. As of 17 September 2025, Israel has killed more than 65,000 Palestinians according to the Gaza Health Ministry. Most of the fatalities were women and children. As recognized by genocide studies scholars and numerous human rights organizations, Israel is committing genocide in Gaza.

=== South African application ===
In earlier proceedings before the Court, South Africa alleged that Israel has committed, and is committing, genocide against Palestinians in the Gaza Strip, in violation of the Genocide Convention, and places the charges in what it describes as the broader context of Israel's conduct towards Palestinians, including what South Africa described as a 75-year apartheid, 56-year occupation, and 16-year blockade of the Strip. South Africa requested that the ICJ render immediate provisional measures of protection by issuing an order to Israel to immediately suspend its military operations in and against Gaza.

Israel's Foreign Ministry characterized South Africa's charges as "baseless" and further accused South Africa as "functioning as the legal arm" of Hamas. Israel argues that it is conducting a war of self-defence in accordance with international law following the Hamas-led attacks on its territory on 7 October 2023. Approximately 1,200 people, most of them civilians, were killed in these attacks, and over 250 were taken hostage. Israel points to ongoing firing of missiles at civilian population centres, the kidnapping and holding of Israeli hostages in Gaza, and contends that its war cabinet and military authorities directives show no genocidal intent. While acknowledging the high incidence of civilian casualties, Israel attributes them to Hamas and other militant groups using civilian infrastructure as cover for their military assets and operations. Israel asserts compliance with international law and claims to facilitate humanitarian aid into the territory.

The court issued an Order in relation to the provisional measures request on 26 January 2024, in which it ordered Israel to take all measures to prevent any acts that could be considered genocidal according to the 1948 Genocide Convention. The court said "at least some of the acts and omissions alleged by South Africa to have been committed by Israel in Gaza appear to be capable of falling within the provisions of the [Genocide] Convention". The court did not order Israel to suspend its military campaign in the Gaza Strip, which South Africa had requested. Both South African and Israeli officials welcomed the decision, with each considering it a victory. The court also expressed "grave concern" about the fate of the hostages held in the Gaza Strip and recognized the catastrophic situation in Gaza "at serious risk of deteriorating further" prior to a final verdict.

== Proceedings ==
=== Nicaragua's application ===
==== Jurisdiction ====
Nicaragua submitted that both it and Germany have accepted the compulsory jurisdiction of the court in the matter, since the reservations of neither party at the time of their acceptance of that jurisdiction include the present case. Article IX of the Genocide Convention provides for the jurisdiction of the Court in disputes as to the "interpretation, application or fulfilment" of its provisions, and neither Nicaragua nor Germany have stated any reservations under which Article IX falls. Nicaragua further submitted that such a dispute exists. By a note verbale dated 2 February 2024 to the Federal Foreign Office of Germany, Nicaragua urged Germany to halt arms supplies to Israel and alleged that they could be used in violation of the Genocide Convention, denounced the suspension of funding of the UNRWA as contrary to Germany's obligations under international law, and accused Germany of failing to comply with its obligations under the Genocide Convention. In the note, Nicaragua said that, in view of its own obligations erga omnes partes, it was prepared to institute proceedings before the Court, and reminded Germany of its own obligations. Nicaragua claimed that, because Germany "rejected the...contents" of a press release concerning the contents of the note verbale, a dispute exists concerning, inter alia, "the interpretation and application of the Genocide Convention, the Geneva Conventions of 1949", and international law.

==== Germany's actions ====
Nicaragua submitted that Germany was aware of "violations being committed by Israel from the moment of their first occurrence" including Israel's alleged intent to "target the civilian population, a clear act of collective punishment". It cited the remarks of the Chancellor of Germany, Olaf Scholz, who said that "Israel's security is a German raison d'État", supplies of weapons to Israel, and concerns expressed about harm to Palestinian civilians and a risk of genocide. It argued that German policy on aid towards Palestinians "increased the vulnerability of the Palestinian population, particularly Gazans, and contributed to the very present risk of irreparable prejudice." It claimed that Germany suspended funds on the basis of allegedly unreliable Israeli allegations that members of the UNRWA were involved in Hamas's attack of 7 October. Nicaragua submitted that funding for the UNRWA was "relied upon" for the continuation of its work, on which "over two million people [depend]", including for health services, environmental health, pest control, water quality, education, and microfinance. Nicaragua cited the UNRWA's warning that suspension of funding could lead to the cessation of its operations "by the end of February", despite the presence of widespread hunger in the Gazan population according to UN reports.

==== Remedies sought ====
Nicaragua sought an adjudication and declaration that

- in assisting, supplying, and failing to pressure Israel, Germany breached its obligations under the Genocide Convention, Fourth Geneva Convention, its duty to uphold the right to self-determination of the Palestinian people;
- in suspending funding to the UNRWA, Germany breached its obligations under the Genocide Convention, international humanitarian law, and the Fourth Geneva Convention;
- in failing to institute proceedings against persons responsible for crimes under international law including war crimes and apartheid, Germany breached its own obligations under international law; and
- Germany must cease the alleged breaches above, assure their non-repetition, and "make full reparation for the injury caused its internationally wrongful acts[sic]".

==== Provisional measures ====
Nicaragua further asked the court to indicate provisional measures pursuant to its own obligations erga omnes. Nicaragua alleged an "imminent risk of a complete humanitarian catastrophe". It cited the remarks of Israeli officials, and UN officials. It submitted that the court had prima facie jurisdiction because of the existence of a dispute between Nicaragua and Germany. Nicaragua further submitted that both it and Germany had, in acceding to the Genocide Convention, "undertaken to prevent genocide", including prohibitions on certain acts and positive duties to seek to prevent such acts. Nicaragua submitted that there was therefore a "risk of irreparable harm and [an] urgent need to protect the rights of the Palestinian people", that the court had already reached such a conclusion in earlier proceedings instituted by South Africa, that it had expressed concern that the situation was worsening, and that its application engaged not only the obligations under the Genocide Convention by which the court was concerned in those proceedings but also "those of convenitional[sic] and customary international law". Accordingly, it submitted that "the rights Nicaragua seeks to preserve involv[e] the lives of hundreds of thousands of people".

Nicaragua therefore sought the indication of provisional measures including

- the immediate suspension of German aid and military assistance to Israel so far as it could be used in violation of the Genocide Convention or international law;
- German efforts to ensure that weapons it had already delivered were not used for such purposes; and
- resumption of German funding of the UNRWA.

The Rules of Court provide that "request[s] for the indication of provisional measures shall have priority over all other cases".

=== Oral proceedings ===
On March 15, 2024, the court announced oral arguments would be heard on 8–9 April. Nicaragua presented its case on 8 April. German response was presented the following day.

=== Provisional measures by the court ===
On April 30, the court ruled against imposing any provisional measures, though declining to throw out Nicaragua's case, as requested by Germany.

=== Germany's response to Nicaragua's application ===
Germany responded that the case would be at odds with the "indispensable third party" principle established in the Monetary Gold case. It stated that only a small amount of the 326 million euros worth of arms/military equipment deliveries in 2023 would be for war weapons (Kriegswaffen). Moreover, 80% of exports since October 2023 occurred in that month alone. And despite the pause in payments to UNRWA since January 2024, the German government helped the Palestinians with payments to UNICEF, the World Food Programme and the International Red Cross.

== Commentary ==
Imogen Saunders of the Australian National University wrote that Nicaragua's application was the "first ... to allege contribution to the act of genocide rather than the commission of the act itself". Saunders wrote that Nicaragua's case "rests on a finding that genocide is being committed in Gaza", in which case Israel would be an "indispensable third party" to the case; in the absence of an indispensable third party, a case is inadmissible. Saunders suggests that Nicaragua may have intervened in South Africa's proceedings against Israel under Article 62 of the Statute of the International Court of Justice in order to avoid impediments to the admissibility of its case.

== See also ==
- South Africa's genocide case against Israel
- Israeli war crimes in the Gaza war
- Gaza genocide
- Israeli apartheid
