= Adam Broomberg =

Artist and human rights person

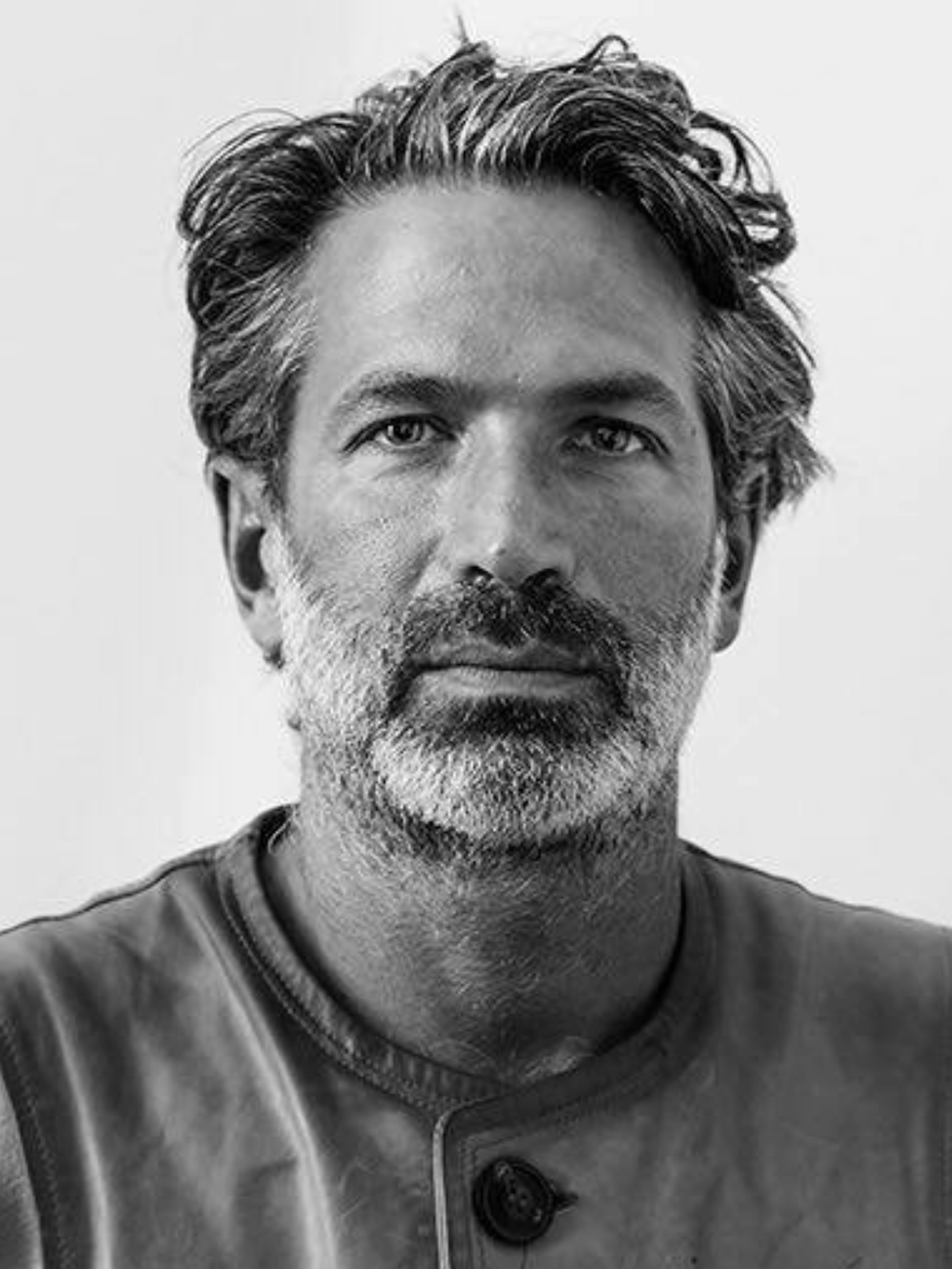
- Portrait of Adam Broomberg
- Born: 11 November 1970 (age 55); Johannesburg, South Africa
- Years active: 1986–present
- Known for: Photographer, educator, activist

Adam Broomberg (born November 11, 1970) is a South African photographer, educator, and activist based in Berlin, Germany. He is the co-founder and coordinator of the NGO Artists + Allies x Hebron alongside the Palestinian activist Issa Amro.

Broomberg's work often explores themes of conflict and power, and how they intersect with the photographic medium. Eyal Weizman described his practice as “hacking into the source code of photography.” He is known for challenging existing power structures and using art as a means of fostering social change.

He has had solo exhibitions at The Centre Georges Pompidou (2018) and the Hasselblad Center (2017), and participated in international group shows that include the Venice Biennale (2024), Yokohama Trienniale (2017), Documenta, Kassel (2017), The British Art Show 8 (2015-2017), Conflict, Time, Photography at Tate Modern (2015); Shanghai Biennale (2014); Museum of Modern Art, New York (2014); Tate Britain (2014), and the Gwanju Biennale (2012). His work is held in public and private collections including Pompidou, Tate, MoMA, Yale, Stedelijk, V&A, the Art Gallery of Ontario, Cleveland Museum of Art, and the Baltimore Museum of Art.

== Early life and education ==
He grew up in a politically charged environment during the Apartheid era in South Africa where he was sent to Zionist Jewish religious school, which influenced his later artistic practice. Broomberg’s upbringing in a racially and ethnically segregated society shaped his awareness of social inequalities and fueled his desire to challenge dominant narratives through his work.

In 1998, Broomberg received a Bachelor of Arts degree in Sociology and History of Art from the University of the Witwatersrand.

== Teaching and academic career ==
Broomberg was professor of photography at the Hochschule für bildende Künste (HFBK) in Hamburg, Germany, from 2015 to 2021. He briefly held the position of visiting professor at Karlsruhe (HfG) from October 2024 which was cut short due to his vocal solidarity with the Palestinian struggle and criticism of Zionism.

He is a faculty member on MA programme, Photography & Society at the Royal Academy of Art (KABK) in the Hague. He frequently leads workshops and lectures at international institutions.

== Collaboration with Oliver Chanarin ==
In the early 2000s, Adam Broomberg formed a creative partnership with fellow artist Oliver Chanarin. Both were awarded the Deutsche Börse Photography Prize (2013) for their publication War Primer 2, the ICP Infinity Award (2014) for Holy Bible as well as the Arles Photo Text Award (2018) for War Primer 2.

Their work has been displayed in institutions, including Tate Modern, The Museum of Modern Art (MoMA), and the Victoria and Albert Museum.

They ended their 23 year collaboration with an exhibition entitled The Last Estate Broomberg & Chanarin at Fabra i Coats in Barcelona.

=== Activism ===
==== Founding of Linx ====
At the age of 16, Broomberg co-founded a political organisation called "Linx" in South Africa alongside other young students, including Yaël Farber. The group aimed to sensitize young white South Africans about the realities of Apartheid and raise their political awareness.

==== Polaroid and apartheid + Kodak and race ====
In 2013, Broomberg and Oliver Chanarin spent a month in South Africa to highlight the racial bias in photographic technology during the Apartheid era. They used decades-old film engineered primarily for white faces to create their work. They employed Polaroid's vintage ID-2 camera, which included a "boost" button to increase the flash intensity, allowing it to photograph black people for the notorious passbooks, or "dompas," used by the state to control their movements.

==== Spirit is a Bone ====
Another collaborative project with Oliver Chanarin, Spirit is a Bone, critiques facial recognition technology, particularly in Russia. The project examines how photographed faces, stripped of context and interaction, become mere digital equivalents of death masks, highlighting the dehumanizing effects of such technologies.

==== Baby It's Cold Outside ====
In 2016, ahead of the Brexit referendum, Broomberg and Chanarin designed and sold ethically made t-shirts bearing the slogan "Baby It’s Cold Outside." The slogan, a reference to the 1940s eponymous Christmas song, served as a protest against a potential exit from the European Union. Reflecting on his global identity, Broomberg said, "My family escaped Europe before the Holocaust, I grew up in Africa, I learnt to be an artist in Italy, and I’ve lived in England for 20 years. I feel at home in the world.”

==== Hands off our Revolution ====
In 2016, Broomberg criticised the art market for continuing "business as usual" following the election of Donald Trump. To counter modern fascism, he created "Hands off our Revolution," a collaborative web-based art project involving artists, thinkers, and researchers. The project’s manifesto stated, “This time, the threat, in the form of Donald Trump’s ‘whitelash’ fascism, is not just apparent in the United States. Trump’s election has emboldened the right wing throughout the world.”

==== Artists + Allies x Hebron ====
Founded by Broomberg, this initiative focuses on the surveillance methods used by Israeli authorities to monitor Palestinians in and around Hebron. Often dubbed "Facebook for Palestinians," this surveillance relies heavily on facial recognition technology. The initiative repurposed this technology in a project called "Counter-Surveillance: H2," which aimed to protect the olive harvest instead of surveilling Palestinian communities.

==== Row with Stefan Hensel ====
In February 2023, Broomberg defended himself in an article in Die Zeit against allegations of antisemitism made by Stefan Hensel, Hamburg's commissioner against antisemitism. Broomberg expressed fears for his safety in Germany and defended his support for the BDS movement.

==== Support for BDS ====
In 2021, Broomberg spoke out in an article in taz against the Hochschule für bildende Künste Hamburg (HFBK), which ended its collaboration with him after he identified the ongoing Israeli occupation of Palestinian territories as "apartheid." He also called on artists to boycott the Zabludowicz Art Trust, citing its alleged funding from Israeli arms industries.

==== Berlin Arrest ====
In May 2023, Broomberg was arrested by German police at a Jewish-led Nakba commemoration in Berlin.

=== Exhibitions ===
2024

- SOUTH WEST BANK. Landworks, Collective Action and Sound, Collateral Event of the 60th International Art Exhibition of La Biennale di Venezia, Venice, Italy
- Silent Times, Xtra City Kunsthalle, Antwerpen, Belgium
- Water Like Tears, Flour Like Soil, ICD Brookfield Place, Dubai, UAE

2022

- düsseldorf photo+ Biennale for Visual and Sonic Media, Düsseldorf, Germany
- New Viewings, Galerie Barbara Thumm, virtual exhibition platform
- artists & allies V, signs and symbols, New York
- Adam Broomberg with CAConrad and Gersande Spelsberg: Glitter in My Wounds, signs and symbols, New York, US.

==== 2021 ====
- The Late Estate Broomberg & Chanarin, Fabra i Coats Centre d'Art Contemporani, Barcelona, Spain
- That was then, this is now, signs and symbols, New York, US.
- artists & allies IV, signs and symbols, New York, US.

2020

- artists & allies III, signs and symbols, New York, US.

==== 2019 ====
- Woe from Wit, Synthesis Gallery, Berlin, Germany

==== 2018 ====
- Broomberg & Chanarin: Divine Violence, Centre Georges Pompidou, Paris, France
- Fig-futures, WEEK 3 / Broomberg & Chanarin, Kettle's Yard, Cambridge, UK
- Bandage the Knife, Not the Wound, Nogueras Blanchard Gallery, Madrid, Spain
- Bandage the Knife, Not the Wound, Goodman Gallery, Johannesburg, South Africa

==== 2017 ====
- Not for Publication and Sale in Iran, Ag Galerie, Tehran, Iran
- The Bureaucracy of Angels (commission), Kings Cross St. Pancras, Art on the Underground – TfL, London, UK
- Trace Evidence, Lisson Gallery, Milan, Italy
- Don’t Start With The Good Old Things But The Bad New Ones, Hasselbad Foundation, Gothenburg, Sweden

==== 2016 ====
- Don’t Start With The Good Old Things But The Bad New Ones, C/O Berlin, Berlin, Germany

==== 2015 ====
- Every Piece of Dust on Freud's Couch, Freud Museum, London, UK
- Rudiments, Lisson Gallery, London, UK
- People in Trouble Laughing Pushed to the Ground, Belfast Exposed, Belfast, UK
- To Photograph the Details of a Dark Horse in Low Light, Foam Fotografiemuseum, Amsterdam, Netherlands
- Divine Violence, Goodman Gallery, Cape Town, South Africa

=== Publications ===
2024

- Anchor in the Landscape (monograph), Adam Broomberg & Rafael Gonzalez, MACK, London, UK. ISBN 978-1-915743-68-8

2021

- Glitter in My Wounds (monograph), Adam Broomberg + CAConrad + Gersande Spelsberg, MACK, London, UK. ISBN 978-1-913620-36-3

2019

- Der Greif 12 — Blame the Algorithm, Adam Broomberg & Oliver Chanarin, Der Greif.

2018

- War Primer 2 (monograph), Adam Broomberg & Oliver Chanarin, MACK, London, UK. ISBN 978-1-912339-14-3

2017

- VITAMIN C: Collage in Contemporary Art (catalogue), Phaidon Editors, with an introductory essay by Yuval Etgar, Phaidon. ISBN 978-1838665-57-9

2016

- Menschen und andere Tiere (monograph), Adam Broomberg & Oliver Chanarin, Kehrer Verlag. ISBN 978-3-86828-750-9

==== 2015 ====
- Humans and Other Animals (monograph), Adam Broomberg & Oliver Chanarin, Tate Publishing. ISBN 978-1-849763-67-7
- Spirit is a Bone (monograph), Adam Broomberg & Oliver Chanarin, MACK, London, UK. ISBN 978-1-910164-18-1

2014

- Dodo (catalogue), Adam Broomberg & Oliver Chanarin, RM Verlag, Barcelona, Spain. ISBN 978-84-15118-92-3

2013

- Holy Bible (monograph), Adam Broomberg & Oliver Chanarin, MACK, London, UK. ISBN 9781907946417
- Scarti (monograph), Adam Broomberg & Oliver Chanarin, Trolley Books. ISBN 978-1-907112-46-1

2012

- SPBH Book Club Vol I (monograph), Adam Broomberg and Oliver Chanarin, Self Publish Be Happy.
- Black market (monograph), Adam Broomberg and Oliver Chanarin, Chopped Liver Press. ISBN 978-0957161207

2011

- People In Trouble Laughing Being Pushed To The Ground (monograph), Adam Broomberg and Oliver Chanarin, MACK, London, UK. ISBN 978-1907946042
- Alias (monograph), Adam Broomberg and Oliver Chanarin, Fundacja Sztuk Wizualnych. ISBN 978-83-928967-9-1

2007

- Fig (monograph), Adam Broomberg & Oliver Chanarin, Steidl/Photoworks. ISBN 9783865214751
- Chicago (monograph), Adam Broomberg & Oliver Chanarin, Steidl. ISBN 978-3865213075

2004

- Mr. Mkhize’s Portrait (monograph), Adam Broomberg & Oliver Chanarin, Trolley Books. ISBN 978-1904563310

2003

- Ghetto (monograph), Adam Broomberg & Oliver Chanarin, Trolley Books. ISBN 9781904563006

2000

- Trust (monograph), Adam Broomberg & Oliver Chanarin, Westzone Publishing. ISBN 0-9537438-9-6

== Selected solo work and exhibitions ==
In addition to his collaborative projects, Broomberg has worked and has exhibited internationally. His photographs often evoke a sense of intimacy and vulnerability, encouraging viewers to confront uncomfortable truths and question established norms. His solo exhibitions have been held in galleries and institutions worldwide, including the Tate Modern in London, the Centre Pompidou in Paris, and the Stedelijk Museum in Amsterdam. His work is included in the collections of institutions such as the Museum of Modern Art (MoMA) in New York, the Victoria and Albert Museum in London, and the Art Institute of Chicago. Listed below are the most recent:

- (2022) Adam Broomberg "Glitter in My Wounds" @ Signs and Symbols, New York, USA
- (2021) Matthew Krouse, Kunsthallo, London, UK
- (2020) Bureaucracy of Angels (online), signs and symbols, New York, USA

== Selected bibliography ==
=== 2024 ===
- Anchor in the Landscape (book), with Rafael Gonzalez, MACK books ISBN 978-1-915743-55-5

=== 2023 ===
- Vitamin C+: Collage in Contemporary Art (book), edited by Rebecca Morrill, Phaidon Press: London & New York ISBN 978-1-838665-57-9
- Rubin, Birgitta, "Fantasieggande vårprogram på Magasin III" (Imaginative spring program at Magasin III), Dagens Nyheter, March 1

=== 2022 ===
- Ruka, Elīna, "The (art) world of Adam Broomberg," FK Magazine, October 6
- Phearse, Terrence, "Adam Broomberg: Rare and Bare", Musée Magazine, Issue No. 27, June 2022 signs and symbols | New York, New York | www.signsandsymbols.art
- Sanchez, Gabriel H., "The Camera Bag: Great Photography to See Now", PhotoSpark, January 25
- Glitter in My Wounds, signs and symbols, New York, New York ISBN 978-1-913620-36-3
- Capone, Emily, ”EXHIBITION REVIEW: Adam Broomberg with CAConrad and Gersande Spelsberg” Musée Magazine, January 12

=== 2021 ===
- Glitter in My Wounds (monograph), Adam Broomberg + CAConrad + Gersande Spelsberg, MACK, London, UK. ISBN 978-1-913620-36-3

=== 2017 ===
- Benjamin und Brecht: Thinking in Extremes (catalog), Akademie der Künste
- Co-Art: Artists on Creative Collaboration (book), Ellen Mara De Wachter, Phaidon. ISBN 978-0-714872-88-9
- Das Gesicht: Bilder, Medien, Format (catalog), Deutsche Hygiene-Museum, Dresden
- In/Visible War: The Culture of War in Twenty-First-Century America (book), Rutgers University Press
- Photography And Collaboration: From Conceptual Art To Crowdsourcing (book), Daniel Palmer, Bloomsbury Publishing. ISBN 978-1-350008-31-1
- Yokohama Triennale: Islands (catalog), Constellations & Galapagos

=== 2016 ===
- Emanations: The Art of the Cameraless Photograph (book), Geoffrey Batchen, The Govett-Brewster Art Gallery and DelMonico Books – Prestel. ISBN 978-3-791355-04-7
- Il y a de l'autre (catalog), Julie Jones and Agnés Geoffrey, RM/JUMEX
- Watched: Surveillance, Art and Photography (catalog), Cornerhouse Publications

=== 2015 ===
- Art & Religion in the 21st Century (book), Aaron Rosen, Thames & Hudson. ISBN 978-0-500293-03-4
- Art in the Age of... (catalog), Witte de With Center for Contemporary Art
- COLORS: A Book About a Magazine About the Rest of the World (book), Damiani / Fabrica. ISBN 978-8-862084-24-6
- Perspectives on Place: Theory and Practice in Landscape Photography (book), J.A.P Alexander, Bloomsbury. ISBN 978-1-472533-89-0
- Rudiments (catalog), Centre for Contemporary Art Ujazdowski Castle

== Awards and recognition ==
Throughout his career, Broomberg has received numerous awards and accolades for his contributions to the field of contemporary art.

=== 2018 ===
- Photo Text Book Award at the Arles Photo Festival, Arles, France (together w. Chanarin)

=== 2014 ===
- Infinity Award, International Center of Photography, New York, New York (together w. Chanarin)

=== 2013 ===
- Deutsche Börse Photography Prize, The Photographers Gallery, London, UK (together w. Chanarin)

=== 2004 ===
- Vic Odden Award, Royal Photographic Society, Bath, UK (together w. Chanarin)
