= Zionist antisemitism =

Antisemitic supporters of Zionism and Israel

Zionist antisemitism, also known as antisemitic Zionism or pro-Israel antisemitism, refers to a phenomenon in which antisemites express support for Zionism and the State of Israel. In some cases, this support may be promoted for explicitly antisemitic reasons. Historically, this type of antisemitism has been most notable among Christian Zionists, who may perpetrate religious antisemitism while being outspoken in their support for Jewish sovereignty in Israel due to their interpretation of Christian eschatology. Similarly, people who identify with the far right, particularly in Europe and the United States, may support the Zionist movement because they seek to expel Jews from their countries and see Zionism as the least complicated method (in comparison to ethnic cleansing or genocide) of achieving this goal and satisfying their racial antisemitism. (Note: "Since Zionism's birth in Europe more than a century ago, it has attracted support from Christians who supported a Jewish state at least in part because they feared Jews would undermine the ethnic and religious purity of their own countries. That tradition remains alive in both Europe and the United States today, where research suggests that antagonism towards the Jews in one's own nation correlates with support for Israel, which offers Jews a nation of their own." (Beinart 2023))

The Israeli government's alleged collaboration with antisemitic politicians abroad has been criticized by anti-Zionists as a manifestation of Zionist antisemitism, in that it seeks to highlight Jew-hatred in order to provide further incentive for Jewish immigration to Israel. In this context, anti-Zionists have criticized the Zionist movement's alleged complicity with or capitulation to antisemitism since it gained traction in the 19th century, and some anti-Zionists have also categorized Zionism as a form of antisemitism.

== Background ==
A complex matrix of racial stereotypes invested European representations of the Jews (conceived of as male), notions not only claiming there were physical traits which marked out Jews from other people, such as that Jews had darker skins, larger noses, were prone to disease or limping and the like, (Note: For a comprehensive survey of these physical stereotypes, which Jewish doctors also accepted as "scientific", see Sander Gilman (1991/2013) (Gilman 2013).) but also that they were rootless and a corruptive presence within Western societies. The massive waves of emigration westwards by Eastern European Jews (known as Ostjuden in German), which were triggered by the recurrence of pogroms throughout Eastern Europe from the 1880s onward, not only intensified prejudices in societies where Jewish communities were well-established and assimilated, but led to the internalization of these putative Jewish characteristics in Jewish self-representations themselves. (Note: "a 'Jew' would be defined as much by the social setting as internally. Indeed, my sense is that the greater the identification of the Jew with the goals and values of the broader society, the more impacted the Jew is by the power of such images. But no one who identifies, either positively or negatively, with the label 'Jew' is immune from the power of such stereotypes." (Gilman 2013, p. 1)) To complicate matters, Western European, especially German, Jewish stereotypes of these Ostjuden were often exploited by antisemites as endorsements of their prejudices. (Note: Speaking of the Austrian-Jewish novelist Karl Emil Franzos's Aus Halb-Asien (1876) where many later anti-Jewish stereotypes are portrayed in the depictions of Eastern Jews, Aschheim writes: "AntiSemites regularly annexed the language and descriptions of half-Asia to buttress their case. To make matters worse, they often invoked Franzos as proof that German Jews opposed the Ostjuden as much as they themselves, Some politicians in the Weimar period defended German Jews by deflecting negative Jewish characteristics onto the Ostjuden in specifically Franzosian terms." (Aschheim 1982, p. 31)) These antisemitic stereotypes influenced the representation of Jews in Zionism, and are evidenced also in the writings of Zionist public opinion makers. (Note: Anita Shapira remarks:"Anti-Semitic stereotypes and tropes did nourish, to some degree, the thought of Zionist public opinion makers." (Efron 2003, p. 259))

== Early Zionism ==
According to Jordanian academic Joseph Massad, writing in Middle East Eye, there is a historic link between the Zionist movement and antisemites, in so far as, as modern Zionism's founder Theodor Herzl recognized, both share at least one basic aim: the negation of the Diaspora. As early as mid-1895, Herzl described his expectation that in supporting the emigration of Jews, "anti-Semites will become our most dependable friends, the anti-Semitic countries our allies".

In constructing their image of the "new Jew" or "Hebrew", the early Zionists contrasted this image against the Yid, the negative caricature of European Jewry. In doing so, they employed language similar to that of antisemites. For example, the Russian-born Jewish scholar Ze'ev Jabotinsky, who developed Revisionist Zionism in the 20th century, wrote:

Our starting point is to take the typical Yid of today and to imagine his diametrical opposite ... because the Yid is ugly, sickly, and lacks decorum, we shall endow the ideal image of the Hebrew with masculine beauty. The Yid is trodden upon and easily frightened and, therefore, the Hebrew ought to be proud and independent. The Yid is despised by all and, therefore, the Hebrew ought to charm all. The Yid has accepted submission and, therefore, the Hebrew ought to learn how to command. The Yid wants to conceal his identity from strangers and, therefore, the Hebrew should look the world straight in the eye and declare: "I am a Hebrew!"

American academic Amy Kaplan, writing in MondoWeiss, has said that "anti-Semitism and pro-Zionism have never been mutually exclusive. Advocates for a Jewish state enlisted stereotypes of Jews – wittingly or not – to further their cause. Theodor Herzl himself appealed to European leaders that Zionism would resolve the 'Jewish Question' by sending Jews elsewhere". Writing for International Socialist Review, Annie Levin argues that the writings of Theodor Herzl, Max Nordau, and other European Zionists were "littered with descriptions of European Jews as parasites, social diseases, germs, aliens", and she also argued that these antisemitic views "flowed quite logically from Zionism's basic assumptions about Jews. Zionists accepted the 19th century view that anti-Semitism–in fact all racial difference–was a permanent feature of human nature. For this reason it was pointless to struggle against it." Levin said that Jews have often been "hostile to Zionism" because the movement "called for a retreat from the struggle against anti-Semitism."

In his book Conspiracy, American historian Daniel Pipes notes that "some antisemites favor a Jewish state as a means of reducing the Jewish population in their midst." Pipes mentions German journalist Wilhelm Marr, the anti-Jewish agitator who coined the term "antisemitism", as an early example of a "pro-Zionist antisemite". Marr supported Jewish migration from Europe to Palestine as being beneficial both for German Jews and for German antisemites. Pipes describes this variety of antisemitism as less common compared to conspiratorial or anti-Zionist antisemitism.

According to the political theorist Michael Walzer, the first anti-Zionists in the 19th century were Orthodox Jews who believed that Zionism was a heretical ideology; they argued that the return of Jews to the Land of Israel and the establishment of a state would only occur after the Messiah came and until then Jews must accept living in diaspora and defer to non-Jewish rulers while waiting for redemption. Zionists, who were usually secular, despised the perceived passivity of Orthodox Jews "with such passion" that they were referred to as antisemites by Orthodox anti-Zionists. For example, In 1918, Hungarian anti-Zionist Rabbi Baruch Meir Klein, President of the New York Board of Rabbis, said that the "Goyyim in America let us be Jews. They do not ruin our Talmud Torah. They do not reform our schools. ... They do not ridicule Jews who go to Mikveh or Kloppen Hoyshaness. ... It is enough for me to be in Galuth (disapora) with Goyyim. I have no need to be [in Eretz Israel], in Galuth under Jews who are antisemitic Zionists."

A similar conclusion was reached at the opposite end of the Jewish political spectrum, by some liberal assimilationist Jews. For example, British Liberal Party politician Edwin Montagu, the sole Jewish member of the Lloyd George ministry and an ardent anti-Zionist, was "passionately opposed to the [Balfour] declaration on the grounds that ... it was a capitulation to anti-Semitic bigotry, with its suggestion that Palestine was the natural destination of the Jews".

The Austrian-Jewish anti-Zionist writer Karl Kraus regarded antisemitism as the "essence" of the Zionist movement and used the label "Jewish antisemites" to describe Jews who identified as Zionists. He attacked German-Jewish self-hatred, gaining notoriety at the turn of the twentieth century for his pamphlets A Crown for Zion and Die demolierte Literatur (Demolished Literature). In the former, he thrust barbs at what he saw as the self-hating aspects of German Jewish society and German Zionism, while in the latter, he lampoons a couple of members of the Viennese literary crowd (a Jewish crowd, though this was not an overt part of this second work). In A Crown for Zion, Kraus suggests that in attempting to assimilate, German Jews had imbibed the stereotypes and beliefs in racial power structures pervasive through German society. He describes assimilationist Zionists, and Herzl in particular, as "Jewish antisemites" in the same vein as the "Aryan antisemites" for their common desire to expel Jews from European culture.

A similar situation also existed in the Kingdom of Romania. Prime Minister Dimitrie Sturdza, while promoting antisemitic policies, endorsed the 1881 Focșani Zionist Congress and, in an 1886 interview for The New York Herald, he declared that "the idea of a Jewish state is an exceptional idea" and that "the creation of a Jewish state is the only solution for the Jewish Question".

Writing for Socialist Worker in 2017, Sarah Levy asserted that early Zionists "partnered with a rabidly antisemitic British ruling class to secure funding for their colonial project in Palestine".

In a 2013 op-ed for Al Jazeera English, Joseph Massad stated: "It is Israel's claims that it represents and speaks for all Jews that are the most anti-Semitic claims of all." Massad said that "Jewish opponents of Zionism" understood that gentile Europeans "shared the precepts of anti-Semitism" and that Zionists and antisemites held a shared belief in "the expulsion of Jews from Europe". Massad said that most pre-War European Jews resisted the "anti-Semitic basis of Zionism", while European countries typically supported "the anti-Semitic programme of Zionism".

== In Israel ==
Racism between Jews has been documented in Israel. In 2023, a video circulated on social media showing Likud activist Itzik Zarka shouting "may you burn in hell" at protesters and disrespecting Holocaust victims by further adding, "I am proud of the six million that were burned, I wish that another six million would be burned", whilst additionally referring to leftists as traitors. Zarka was temporarily removed from the party under orders by Benjamin Netanyahu, but his membership was later restored.

In 2025, the Israeli government held a conference about antisemitism in Jerusalem. The conference sparked controversy due to the invitation of far-right politicians in Europe who have been accused of antisemitism, racism, and Holocaust denial. The president of the European Jewish Congress (EJC), Ariel Muzicant, characterized the invitation of far-right politicians as a "stab in the back" to European Jews and accused the Israeli government of "helping our enemies". The former EJC president Michel Friedman stated: "Nobody who convenes a conference against antisemitism can at the same time invite antisemites who spread the poison of prejudice and hatred." Several individuals and organizations dropped out of the conference in protest, including Jonathan Greenblatt of the Anti-Defamation League (ADL) and the philosopher Bernard-Henri Lévy. The former ADL head Abraham Foxman stated that the invitations legitimized "authoritarian neo-fascist political parties" and accused the Israeli government of abnegating its duty to "defend Jews around the world".

== In the United States ==
In the US, left-wing Jews and others have accused mainstream Zionists of using antisemitic tropes against progressive Jews and of allying with Christian and conservative antisemites. Austin Ahlman of The Intercept said that Zionist organization Democratic Majority for Israel (DMFI) employed antisemitic tropes during the 2020 election after DMFI released attack ads criticizing the progressive Jewish California politician Sara Jacobs. The ads emphasized Jacobs' wealthy background, portraying her "fortune and privileged life" as making her out of touch with ordinary Americans. The Intercept said that the "imagery and language employed by many of the ads are reminiscent of common antisemitic tropes", noting that DMFI had previously endorsed wealthy non-Jewish candidates. Rachel Rosen, a DMFI spokesperson, denied accusations that the ads were antisemitic.

In August 2022, the left-wing Jewish organization IfNotNow tweeted that AIPAC was antisemitic after AIPAC said that "George Soros has a long history of backing anti-Israel groups" and that "J Street & Soros work to undermine" pro-Israel Democrats. IfNotNow tweeted that AIPAC was not a Jewish organization, did not represent Jews, and in allegedly promoting antisemitic conspiracy theories about Soros, AIPAC had become part of the "antisemitic far right".

The March for Israel, held in Washington, D.C., in November 2023 featured the Christians United for Israel founder and Evangelical pastor John Hagee as a speaker. No Jewish clergy were invited to speak. Hagee has sparked controversy in the past for claiming that Jews were responsible for the Holocaust by being "disobedient" to God, that God sent Hitler, and that Hitler was of Jewish descent. Critics, including progressive Jewish organizations, denounced Hagee's presence. Rabbi Jill Jacobs of T'ruah tweeted that she and other members of the Progressive Israel Network believe Hagee's "so-called support of Israel is based in antisemitism". Writing for Mondoweiss, Rabbi Jessica Rosenberg and Reverend Allyn Maxfield-Steele wrote that Hagee's presence was "entirely predictable...for those familiar with the long-standing alliance between Zionists and antisemites" and that supporting Israel doesn't automatically make someone an ally to Jewish people.

Also in November 2023, businessman Elon Musk endorsed an antisemitic tweet claiming that "Jews push the exact kind of dialectical hatred against whites that they claim to want people to stop using against them." A day later, Musk announced he would ban pro-Palestinian slogans such as "decolonization" and "from the river to the sea" on Twitter, for which he received praise from Anti-Defamation League (ADL) CEO Jonathan Greenblatt. Columnist Michelle Goldberg wrote in The New York Times that "Musk appears to have learned the lesson that ardent Zionism can function as an alibi for antisemitism." The Guardian writer and senior editor Sam Wolfson wrote, "Over and over again, alleged antisemites or those who give platforms to antisemites have had their offenses chalked off by some in the pro-Israel movement, as long as they show sufficient deference to the Israeli project."

== Right-wing and Christian Zionist antisemitism ==
Atalia Omer wrote that young Israeli activists "increasingly recognize that their safety depends on linking the fight against antisemitism to other social justice struggles", mentioning those, such as B'Tselem, who "for years have decried the weaponization of antisemitism". Omer said that these "critical voices are silenced within the entrenched ideological regime that the IHRA represents as it coalesces with white nationalist and Christian Zionist antisemitism".

The Norwegian far-right domestic terrorist Anders Behring Breivik is both an antisemitic neo-Nazi and a strong supporter of the State of Israel. The Slovenian philosopher Slavoj Žižek described Breivik's ideology as an "extreme version" of "Zionist anti-Semitism", writing that Breivik is "antisemitic, but pro-Israel" because in Breivik's view the Israeli state is a "first line of defense against Muslim expansion". Žižek notes that Breivik believes that France and the United Kingdom have a "Jewish problem" due to their large Jewish populations, whereas the rest of Western Europe doesn't, describing this as Breivik's belief that "Jews are OK as long as there aren't too many of them" living in diaspora. Journalist Michelle Goldberg referred to Breivik as an "ardent Zionist" who "has nothing but contempt for the majority of Jewish people", arguing that his "embrace of Israel...far from being unique, is just the latest sign" that "in European politics, fascism and an aggressive sort of Zionism increasingly go together." Goldberg cites Islamophobia as a commonality between the State of Israel and "European white nationalists".

During the Gaza war, the historian Stephen F. Eisenman of Northwestern University, writing in CounterPunch, said that it is false to equate all anti-Zionism with antisemitism, both due to the existence of Jewish anti-Zionists including himself, as well as "the existence of Zionists who are anti-Semites". Eisenman listed Arthur Balfour, Viktor Orbán, Vladimir Putin, Glenn Beck, Richard B. Spencer and Donald Trump as examples of "Zionist anti-Semites".

=== Desire to expel the Jewish diaspora ===
Richard S. Levy, a scholar of antisemitism, wrote that "[a]ntisemites certainly found Zionism useful" because Zionism provided "antisemitic Zionists" with a justification as to why Jewish people who were living in the diaspora should be expelled from the societies in which they had lived for centuries. Coerced emigration to the Land of Israel appealed to antisemites because it provided them with a "solution to the Jewish question".

Arthur Balfour was opposed to a British mandate over Palestine, but supported Zionism as a method to reduce the "alien entity" of Jews in gentile societies, whose presence he considered destabilizing. (Note: "He did however believe that Zionism could alleviate the continued presence in gentile society of an alien entity that posed a continuing danger to the stability of that society." (Defries 2014, p. 52)) Writer Bari Weiss considers Balfour as an example of a historical antisemitic Zionist. However, Balfour was instrumental in establishing the creation of a Zionist state. He did so because he did not want Jews emigrating from Eastern Europe, many of whom were escaping pogroms in the Russian Empire, to immigrate to Britain. Weiss cites Balfour's support of the Aliens Act 1905, which restricted Jewish immigration into Britain, as an example of his antisemitism.

The Polish government of the 1930s supported Jewish immigration to Israel for reasons similar to Balfour. The Polish government during this period was a staunch supporter of the Zionist movement, while also adopting increasingly antisemitic domestic policies. The Polish government actively encouraged emigration to Mandatory Palestine because it decreased the population of Polish Jews. Historian Emanuel Melzer wrote that the Polish government's attitudes towards Zionism and Jewish emigration "implied that Jews were superfluous, alien, and even a destructive element" and that this attitude "might have had its repercussions on a part of the Polish population's attitude towards the Jews during the war", but acknowledges that the Shoah itself was not caused by the intensification of Polish antisemitism between 1936 and 1939. During the 1920s and 1930s, the General Jewish Labour Bund in Poland was vocally critical of this antisemitic Zionism. The Bund produced election campaign materials including the terms "antisemitic Zionists" and "Zionist antisemites", arguing that the Zionist promotion of emigration and cooperation with the Polish government strengthened antisemitic forces within Polish society.

The French-Jewish journalist Alain Gresh noted that the antisemitic right-wing politician and Nazi collaborator Xavier Vallat said: "Jews would never integrate into France and that they had to go to Israel." University of Glasgow lecturer Timothy Peace has noted that some members of the French far right could be considered "antisemitic Zionists", because they want French Jews to emigrate to Israel.

=== Antisemitic tendencies among pro-Zionist groups ===
Right-wing evangelical Christians in the United States are often vocally Zionist while also holding antisemitic attitudes towards Jews. Conservative Christians are amongst the strongest supporters of the State of Israel in the United States. With 7.1 million members, Christians United for Israel (CUFI) is the largest Zionist organization in the United States. Many Christian Zionists believe that the Gathering of Israel is a prerequisite for the final coming of the Christian messiah, after which a portion of Jews will convert, and the majority of Jews will be killed and condemned to Hell. Ben Lorber and Aidan Orly, writing in Religion Dispatches, have described Christian Zionism as "one of the largest antisemitic movements in the world today".

Haaretz writer Joshua Shanes condemned CUFI founder John Hagee for promoting an "apocalyptic and deeply antisemitic worldview" and promoting some of the "most dangerous myths of the modern era". Hagee has promoted financial conspiracy theories about the Rothschild family controlling the federal reserve, said that Hitler was sent by God to murder Jews who refused to emigrate to Israel, and described the Antichrist as a "half-Jew homosexual". Slavoj Žižek has also described John Hagee, as well as Glenn Beck, as examples of Christian fundamentalist "anti-Semitic Zionists". Žižek said that Zionism itself has "paradoxically become anti-Semitic" because the movement promotes hatred of anti-Zionist Jews by constructing a figure of Jewish anti-Zionism "along anti-Semitic lines". Žižek describes the way that Jewish anti-Zionists are maligned as "self-hating Jews" by Zionists as an example of Zionist antisemitism.

Zionist leaders and organizations in the United States have been widely criticized, particularly by the Jewish left, for allegedly downplaying the severity of antisemitism in the United States and for alleged complicity with the Trump administration in order to pursue pro-Israel, Zionist causes. Atalia Omer, a professor of religion at the University of Notre Dame, has written that "Israel's silence on white nationalism and its implicit or explicit condoning of antisemitic Zionists" has decisively convinced many American Jews that the Israeli government is not keeping Jews safe and is actively endangering Jews living in the diaspora. Omer cites the "moral shock" of Israeli silence on white nationalist antisemitism for discrediting the "Zionist monopoly over the narrative of Jewish survival".

Sarah Levy criticized Morton Klein, president of the Zionist Organization of America (ZOA), in Jacobin magazine for being "notably silent" about antisemitism during the Trump era. ZOA was deluged by messages from outraged supporters following ZOA's support for Steve Bannon and Klein's statement that he could not be an antisemite because "[h]e's the opposite of an antisemite. He's a philo-semite." +972 Magazine's Natasha Roth-Rowland said that a "rise of Zionist antisemitism as a standard behavior among large swaths of the GOP and its ecosystem has become a defining feature of the American far right's worldview and modus operandi".

In 2017, Judith Butler denounced antisemitic manifestations of Zionism within the Trump administration. Butler wrote: "As many critics have pointed out, it matters that Steve Bannon is a strong Zionist, that his antisemitism apparently does not get in the way of his support for the Israeli state, and that his supporters in the Israeli government do not seem to mind the antisemitism, against which the Anti-Defamation League, the Anne Frank Center, the Jewish Forward, and the Southern Poverty Law Center have all taken a stand." Butler argued that right-wing antisemitic Zionism is a manifestation of white supremacy, whereby the white Ashkenazi ruling class in Israel makes alliances with right-wing politicians in other countries on the basis of shared anti-Arab racism, anti-Palestinianism, and Islamophobia.

In 2019, the Russian-born Jewish-American journalist Masha Gessen described Donald Trump as a "pro-Zionist anti-Semite". Gessen noted that Trump's administration had pursued pro-Israel policies while also spreading Jewish stereotypes, such as the speech Trump delivered at the Israeli American Council National Summit where he declared: "A lot of you are in the real estate business because I know you very well ... You're brutal killers, not nice people at all." Calling Trump's comments "plain, easily recognizable anti-Semitism", Gessen said that Trump views American Jews as "alien beings whom he associates with the state of Israel". The liberal journalist Peter Beinart said that Zionist antisemitism is likely on the rise in the United States and that it is unclear that Zionists are less likely to harbor antisemitic sentiments compared to anti-Zionists. According to Beinart, "[i]t is easy to find antisemitism among people who, far from opposing Zionism, enthusiastically embrace it".

During the January 6 United States Capitol attack in 2021, several insurrectionists waved Israeli flags. In this context, organizations including the Adalah Justice Project, Jewish Voice for Peace, and Students for Justice in Palestine made social media posts suggesting a link between Zionist ideology and antisemitic right-wing extremism. The Anti-Defamation League (ADL) describes these comments as part of an emerging effort among anti-Israel activists to associate "the Israeli flag with white supremacy, racism, settler-colonialism, violence and more". The ADL disputes this association and notes that the organizations promoting the link did not mention the wide variety of other flags present at the Capitol attack, including those of Canada, Cuba, Georgia, India, South Korea, and the former state of South Vietnam.

The historian David N. Myers wrote: "Leading white nationalists such as Richard Spencer and Jared Taylor liken their movement to Zionism, seeing it as a model for the kind of monoethnic purity they favor in [the United States]." Myers states that the "combination of pro-Israel and antisemitic sensibilities" is common within American politics due to the combined influences of the "Christian evangelical Right with its end-game theology", "archly conservative" Catholics, and the political ideology of Donald Trump. Atalia Omer noted "convergences between white supremacist violence and exclusionary politics which often comes in the form of Zionist antisemitism", citing Richard Spencer's "white Zionism" as an example.

Ben Lorber, writing for +972 Magazine, argued that American white nationalist support for the "Jewish state's supremacist values fits comfortably with its deep antisemitism" and that "philosemitic Christian Zionism carries deep undercurrents of anti-Judaism". Lorber refers to the phenomenon of right-wing Zionism fitting "comfortably alongside simmering currents of antisemitism" as "[a]ntisemitic Zionism". Commenting on Breitbart News's apparent support for Zionism in 2016, Steven M. Cohen, sociologist at the Hebrew Union College-Jewish Institute of Religion, said that the correlation between anti-Zionism and antisemitism is weak, and that antisemitism is found among both the anti-Zionist left and the Zionist right. Todd Gitlin, sociologist at Columbia University, said that right-wing Zionism and antisemitism "have the same soul ... [t]hey rhyme" because both are variants of ultra-nationalism.

Project Esther, a project of the Heritage Foundation, has been criticized for incorporating antisemitic tropes into its rhetoric, and for not addressing right-wing antisemitism. The journalist Michelle Goldberg has criticized Project Esther for accusing progressive Jews of being antisemitic and for singling out Jewish Democrats in the US House who refused to censure Rashida Tlaib, which Project Esther characterized as a symptom of "dangerous complacency and indifference across America's Jewish community".

== Belief that Zionism in general is antisemitic ==
Joseph Massad believes that the Zionist conflation of Jewish people with Zionism has become a global "antisemitic consensus". In 2023, according to the Zionist organization StandWithUs, George Washington University psychology professor Lara Sheehi said that Zionism itself was antisemitic; she faced accusations of antisemitism (which were not upheld by her university) for this and other comments.

== See also ==
- Anti-Yiddish sentiment
- Back-to-Africa movement
- Bundism
- Canaanism
- Comparison between Israel and Nazi Germany
- Criticism of the Israeli government
- Haavara Agreement
- Herzl's Mauschel and Zionist antisemitism
- Jewish anti-Zionism
- Kapo
- Lenni Brenner
- Muscular Judaism
- National Socialists for Israel
- Negation of the Diaspora
- New antisemitism
- Right-wing populism
- Wilhelm II's voyage to the Levant in 1898

== Sources ==
- Aschheim, Steven E. (1982). Brothers and Strangers: The East European Jew in German and German Jewish Consciousness, 1800–1923. University of Wisconsin Press. ISBN 978-0-299-09110-1.
- Beinart, Peter (10 January 2023). "Antisemitic Zionists Aren't a Contradiction in Terms". Jewish Currents.
- Boyarin, Daniel (1997). Unheroic Conduct: The Rise of Heterosexuality and the Invention of the Jewish Man. University of California Press. ISBN 978-0-520-21050-9.
- Defries, Harry (2014). Conservative Party Attitudes to Jews 1900-1950. Routledge. ISBN 978-1-135-28469-5.
- Efron, Noah (2003). Real Jews: Secular Versus Ultra-Orthodox: The Struggle For Jewish Identity In Israel. Basic Books. ISBN 978-0-465-01854-3.
- Gilman, Sander (1993). The Case of Sigmund Freud. Johns Hopkins University Press. ISBN 0-8018-4974-8.
- Gilman, Sander (1995). Franz Kafka: the Jewish Patient. Routledge. ISBN 0-415-91177-X.
- Gilman, Sander (2013) [First published 1991]. The Jew's Body. Routledge. ISBN 978-1-136-03878-5.
- Hitchens, Christopher (2004). Love, Poverty, and War: Journeys and Essays. The Nation. ISBN 1-56025-580-3.
- Kaplan, Amy (24 February 2017). "Opinion: History shows that anti-Semitism and pro-Zionism have never been mutually exclusive". Mondoweiss.
- Lorber, Ben (22 January 2021). "How the Israeli flag became a symbol for white nationalists". +972 Magazine.
- Massad, Joseph (15 May 2019). "Pro-Zionism and antisemitism are inseparable, and always have been". Middle East Eye.
- Omer, Atalia (2019). Days of Awe: Reimagining Jewishness in Solidarity with Palestinians. University of Chicago Press. ISBN 978-0-226-61607-0.
- Omer, Atalia (21 January 2021). "Weaponizing Antisemitism is Bad for Jews, Israel, and Peace". University of Notre Dame.
- Reitter, Paul (2008). The Anti-Journalist: Karl Kraus and Jewish Self-Fashioning in Fin-de-Siècle Europe. University of Chicago Press. ISBN 978-0-226-70972-7.
- Rubinstein, Amnon (2000). From Herzl to Rabin: The Changing Image of Zionism. Holmes & Meier. ISBN 978-0-841-91408-7 – via New York Times online archive.
- Weiss, Bari (2019). How to Fight Anti-Semitism. New York: Crown. ISBN 978-0-593-13626-3.
- Zimmerman, Joshua D. (2003). Contested Memories: Poles and Jews During the Holocaust and Its Aftermath. Rutgers University Press. ISBN 978-0-813-53158-8.
- Žižek, Slavoj (8 August 2011). "Opinion: A vile logic to Anders Breivik's choice of target". The Guardian.
- Žižek, Slavoj (2012). The Year of Dreaming Dangerously. Verso Books. ISBN 978-1-781-68043-8.
