= Self-hating Jew =

Pejorative towards Jews

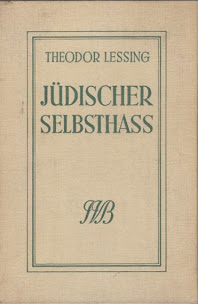
Cover of one edition of Theodor Lessing's 1930 book Der jüdische Selbsthass

The terms "self-hating Jew", "self-loathing Jew", and "auto-antisemite" (Note: Hebrew: אוטואנטישמי, romanized: oto'antishémi, feminine: אוטואנטישמית, romanized: oto'antishémit) are pejorative terms used to describe Jews that oppose certain characteristics that the claimant considers core to Jewish identity.

Early claims of self-hate were used to describe Jews who had internalized antisemitic tropes. Recognition of the concept gained widespread currency after German-Jewish philosopher Theodor Lessing published his 1930 book Der jüdische Selbsthass (lit. 'Jewish Self-Hatred'), which sought to explain a perceived inclination among secular Jewish intellectuals towards inciting antisemitism by denouncing Judaism. The term was also used to describe Jewish people whose viewpoints, especially favoring Jewish assimilation, Jewish secularism, limousine liberalism, or anti-Judaism were perceived to reflect self-hatred.

In modern times the term has been used for political purposes as a form of weaponization of antisemitism to delegitimize anti-Zionist Jews or shield against criticism of the Israeli government. It is said to have become "something of a key term of opprobrium in and beyond Cold War-era debates about Zionism" with proponents claiming that some Jews may despise their entire identity due to their perception of the Arab–Israeli conflict.

== History ==
=== In German ===
The origins of terms such as "Jewish self-hatred" lie in the mid-19th century feuding between German Orthodox Jews of the Breslau seminary and Reform Jews. Each side accused the other of betraying Jewish identity, the Orthodox Jews accusing the Reform Jews of identifying more closely with German Protestantism and German nationalism than with Judaism.

According to Amos Elon, during 19th-century German-Jewish assimilation, conflicting pressures on sensitive and privileged or gifted young Jews produced "a reaction later known as 'Jewish self-hatred.' Its roots were not simply professional or political but emotional." Elon uses the term "Jewish self-hatred" synonymously with Jewish antisemitism when he points out, "One of the most prominent Austrian anti-Semites was Otto Weininger, a brilliant young Jew who published 'Sex and Character', attacking Jews and women." Elon attributes Jewish antisemitism as a cause in the overall growth of antisemitism when he says, "(Weininger's) book inspired the typical Viennese adage that anti-Semitism did not really get serious until it was taken up by Jews."

According to John P. Jackson Jr., the concept developed in the late 19th century in German Jewish discourse as "a response of German Jews to popular anti-Semitism that primarily was directed at Eastern European Jews." For German Jews, the Eastern European Jew became the "bad Jew". According to Sander Gilman, the concept of the "self-hating Jew" developed from a merger of the image of the "mad Jew" and the "self-critical Jew", and was developed to counter suggestions that an alleged Jewish stereotype of mental illness was due to inbreeding. "Within the logic of the concept, those who accuse others of being self-hating Jews may themselves be self-hating Jews." Gilman says "the ubiquitousness of self-hatred cannot be denied. And it has shaped the self-awareness of those treated as different perhaps more than they themselves have been aware."

The specific terms "self-hating Jew" and "Jewish self-hatred" only came into use later, developing from Theodor Herzl's polemical use of the term "anti-Semite of Jewish origin", in the context of his project of political Zionism. The underlying concept gained common currency in this context, "since Zionism was an important part of the vigorous debates that were occurring amongst Jews at the time about anti-Semitism, assimilation and Jewish identity." Herzl appears to have introduced the phrase "anti-Semite of Jewish origin" in his 1896 book, Der Judenstaat (The Jews' State), which launched political Zionism.

He was referring to "philanthropic Zionists", assimilated Jews who might wish to remain in their home countries while at the same time encouraging the Jewish proletariat (particularly the poorer Eastern Jews) to emigrate; yet did not support Herzl's political project for a Jewish state. Ironically, Herzl was soon complaining that his "polemical term" was often being applied to him, for example by Karl Kraus. "Assimilationists and anti-Zionists accused Zionists of being self-haters, for promoting the idea of the strong Jew using rhetoric close to that of the Anti-Semites; Zionists accused their opponents of being self-haters, for promoting the image of the Jew that would perpetuate his inferior position in the modern world." One example of this was the claims made against Herzl's article Mauschel.

The Austrian-Jewish journalist Anton Kuh argued in a 1921 book Juden und Deutsche (Jews and Germans) that the concept of "Jewish antisemitism" was unhelpful, and should be replaced with the term "Jewish self-hatred", but it was not until the 1930 publication of the German-Jewish anti-Nazi philosopher Theodor Lessing's book Der Jüdische Selbsthass (Jewish Self-hatred) that the term gained widespread currency. Lessing's book "supposedly charts Lessing's journey from Jewish self-hater to Zionist." In it he analyses the writings of Jews such as Otto Weininger and Arthur Trebitsch who expressed hatred for their own Judaism. Lessing was assassinated by Nazi agents shortly after Hitler came to power.

=== In English ===
In English the first major discussion of the topic was in the 1940s by Kurt Lewin, who was Lessing's colleague at the University of Berlin in 1930. Lewin emigrated from Germany to the United States in 1933, and though focused on Jews also argued for a similar phenomenon among Polish, Italian and Greek immigrants to the United States. Lewin's was a theoretical account, declaring that the issue "is well known among Jews themselves" and supporting his argument with anecdotes. According to Lewin, a self-hating Jew "will dislike everything specifically Jewish, for he will see in it that which keeps him away from the majority for which he is longing. He will show dislike for those Jews who are outspokenly so, and will frequently indulge in self-hatred." Following Lewin's lead, the concept gained widespread currency. "The 1940s and 1950s were 'the age of self-hatred'. In effect, a bitter war broke out over questions of Jewish identity. It was a kind of 'Jewish Cold War'..." in which questions of Jewish identity were contentiously debated. The use of the concept in debates over Jewish identity – for example over resistance to the integration of African Americans into Jewish neighbourhoods – died down by the end of the 1970s, having been "steadily emptied of most of its earlier psychological, social, and theoretical content and became largely a slogan."

The term was used in a derogatory way during the 1940s by "'militant' Zionists", but the 1963 publication of Hannah Arendt's Eichmann in Jerusalem opened a new chapter. Her criticism of the trial as a "show trial" provoked heated public debate, including accusations of self-hatred, and over-shadowed her earlier work criticising German Jewish parvenu assimilationism. In the following years, after the 1967 Six-Day War and 1973 Yom Kippur War, "willingness to give moral and financial 'support' to Israel constituted what one historian called 'the existential definition of American Jewishness'." "This meant that the opposite was also true: criticism of Israel came to constitute the existential definition of 'Jewish self-hatred'." Alvin H. Rosenfeld dismisses this, saying it "masquerades as victimization" and "can hardly be expected to be taken seriously" since criticism of Israel "proceeds across all the media in this country and within Israel itself."

Even Commentary, the Jewish journal which had once been "considered the venue of self-hating Jews with questionable commitments to the Zionist project", came under the editorship of Norman Podhoretz to staunchly support Israel. In his 2006 essay "Progressive Jewish Thought and the New Anti-Semitism", Rosenfeld takes "a hard look at Jewish authors" whose statements go well beyond "legitimate criticism of Israel," and considers rhetoric that calls into question Israel's "right to continued existence" to be antisemitic. The use of the concept of self-hatred in Jewish debates about Israel has grown more frequent and more intense in the US and the UK, with the issue particularly widely debated in 2007, leading to the creation of the British Independent Jewish Voices. The Forward reported that the group was formed by "about 130 generally leftist Jews." It was the Rosenfeld essay, which did not use the term Jewish self-hatred, that led to the 2007 debate. Critics claimed the charge of antisemitism implied Jewish self-hatred to those criticizing Israel. Rosenfeld responded that such claims were "disingenuous" and for some a "dialectical scam validating themselves as intellectual martyrs." The New York Times reported that the essay spotlighted the issue of when "legitimate criticism of Israel ends and antisemitic statements begin."

== Social and psychological explanations ==
The issue has periodically been covered in the academic social psychology literature on social identity. Such studies "frequently cite Lewin as evidence that people may attempt to distance themselves from membership in devalued groups because they accept, to some degree, the negative evaluations of their group held by the majority and because these social identities are an obstacle to the pursuit of social status." Modern social psychology literature uses terms such as "self-stigmatization", "internalized oppression", and "false consciousness" to describe this type of phenomenon. Author Phyllis Chesler, a professor of psychology and women's studies, in referring to female Jewish self-hatred, points to progressive Jewish women who "seem obsessed with the Palestinian point of view." She believes their rage against oppression, frustration and patriarchy "is being unconsciously transferred onto Israel."

Kenneth Levin, a Harvard psychiatrist, says that Jewish self-hatred has two causes: Stockholm syndrome, where "population segments under chronic siege commonly embrace the indictments of their besiegers however bigoted and outrageous", as well as "the psychodynamics of abused children, who almost invariably blame themselves for their predicament, ascribe it to their being bad, and nurture fantasies that by becoming good they can mollify their abusers and end their torment." According to Howard W. Polsky, the social scientist, "feelings about Jewish marginality are often a step away from self-hatred." He then says, "Jewish self-hatred denotes that a person has adopted gentiles' definition of Jew as bad in one way or another and that being Jewish will hinder their success or identity."

== Usage ==
It is argued by some academics that the concept of Jewish self-hatred is based on an essentialisation of Jewish identity. Accounts of Jewish self-hatred often suggest that criticizing other Jews, and integrating with Gentile society, reveals hatred of one's own Jewish origins. Yet both in the early twentieth century, where the concept developed, and today, there are groups of Jews who had "important differences in identity based on class, culture, religious outlook, and education", and hostility between these groups can only be considered self-hate "if one assumes that a superordinate Jewish identity should take precedence over other groupings of Jews."

Yet such hostility between groups has at times drawn on some of the rhetoric of antisemitism: "criticism of subgroups of Jews which drew on anti-Semitic rhetoric were common in 19th and 20th century arguments over Jewish identity". In practice, according to one academic, whilst there have been Jewish writers in the late 19th and early 20th centuries who consistently employed virulent antisemitic rhetoric without seeming to value any aspects of being a Jew, too often "those who accuse others of being self-haters search for examples of when they have criticized Jews or Judaism but ignore examples of when those they criticize have shown they value being a Jew." He argues that Jewish antisemitism does not necessarily amount to self-hatred, implying that "antisemitic Jew" may be a more accurate term to use. Other authors have also shown a preference for using "antisemitism" rather than "self-hatred."

The term is in use in Jewish publications such as The Jewish Week (New York) and The Jerusalem Post (Jerusalem) in a number of contexts, often synonymously with antisemitic Jew. It is used "to criticize a performer or artist who portrays Jews negatively; as a shorthand description of supposed psychological conflict in fictional characters; in articles about the erosion of tradition (e.g. marrying out and circumcision); and to discount Jews who criticize Israeli policies or particular Jewish practices." However the widest usage of the term is currently in relation to debates over Israel. "In these debates the accusation is used by right-wing Zionists to assert that Zionism and/or support for Israel is a core element of Jewish identity. Jewish criticism of Israeli policy is therefore considered a turning away from Jewish identity itself."

Thus some of those who have been accused of being a "self-hating Jew" have characterized the term as a replacement for "a charge of anti-Semitism [that] will not stick," or as "pathologizing" them. Some who use the term have equated it with "anti-Semitism", on the part of those thus addressed, or with "so called 'enlightened' Jews who refuse to associate themselves with people who practice a 'backward' religion." One novelist, Philip Roth, who — because of the nature of the Jewish characters in his novels, such as the 1969 Portnoy's Complaint — has often been accused of being a "self-hating Jew", argues that all novels deal with human dilemmas and weaknesses (which are present in all communities), and that to self-censor by only writing about positive Jewish characters would represent a submission to antisemitism.

The Israeli-born British Jazz saxophonist, writer and Hebrew speaking antisemite of Jewish descent Gilad Atzmon openly used the term to describe himself in a 2010 interview for the Cyprus Mail. In that interview, Atzmon calls himself a "proud self-hating Jew" and also described fellow Jewish antisemite, the Austrian Otto Weininger as one as well. At the same time, Atzmon stated that he considers a "self-hating Jew" as very different to a "proud self-hating Jew", considering "proud self-hating Jews" such as himself and Weininger as celebrating the hatred they feel for themselves, the Jewish people, Judaism, Israel and anything else they associate with Jewishness. Atzmon has taken several positions on history and politics associated with antisemitism including but not limited to, endorsing on his blog the conspiracy theory that "the Jewish people" are trying to take over the world (though he later amended the original blog post to replace "the Jewish people" with "Zionists"), blaming the entire Jewish people for killing Jesus (including those not even born at the time), accusing Gideon Falter (the chairman of the Campaign Against Antisemitism) of faking antisemitic incidents for profit (Falter then sued Atzmon for libel which Atzmon lost and was left with expensive legal costs) and promoting the conspiracy theory of Holocaust denial, even publicly advising people to read Holocaust denying books by David Irving. The Southern Poverty Law Center (SPLC)'s official blog Hatewatch written by David Neiwert noted that Atzmon was "a self-described 'self-hating ex-Jew' whose writings and pronouncements are rich in conspiracy theories, Holocaust trivialization and distortion, and open support of anti-Israeli terrorist groups."

=== Descriptions of the concept ===
The expression "self-hating Jew" is often used rhetorically, meaning towards Jews who differ in their lifestyles, interests or political positions from the speaker.

- Usage of self-hatred can also designate dislike, or hatred, of a group to which one belongs. The term has a long history in debates over the role of Israel in Jewish identity, where it is used against Jewish critics of Israeli government policy.
- Alvin H. Rosenfeld, an academic author who does not use the term "self-hatred", dismisses such arguments as disingenuous, referring to them as "the ubiquitous rubric 'criticism of Israel,'" stating that "vigorous discussion of Israeli policy and actions is not in question."
- Alan Dershowitz limits the term "self-hatred" to specific Jewish anti-Zionists who "despise anything Jewish, ranging from their religion to the Jewish state", saying it does not apply to all "Israel-bashers."
- The academic historian Jerold Auerbach uses the term Jewish self-loathing to characterize "Jews who perversely seek to bolster their Jewish credentials by defaming Israel."
- The cultural historian Sander Gilman has written, "One of the most recent forms of Jewish self-hatred is the virulent opposition to the existence of the State of Israel." He uses the term not against those who oppose Israel's policy, but against Jews who are opposed to Israel's existence.
- The concept of Jewish self-hatred has been described by Antony Lerman as "an entirely bogus concept", one that "serves no other purpose than to marginalise and demonise political opponents", who says that it is used increasingly as a personal attack in discussions about the "new antisemitism".
- Ben Cohen criticizes Lerman, saying no "actual evidence is introduced to support any of this." Lerman himself recognizes the controversy over whether extreme vilification of Israel amounts to antisemitism, and says that antisemitism can be disguised as anti-Zionism, also a concern of Rosenfeld and Gilman as mentioned above.
- The sociologist Irving Louis Horowitz reserves the term for Jews who pose a danger to the Jewish community, using "Jewish self-hater" to describe the so-called "court Jew", "who validates the slander (against Jews) as he attempts to curry the favor of masters and rulers."
- The historian Bernard Wasserstein prefers the term "Jewish anti-Semitism," which he says was often termed "Jewish self-hatred". He asks, "Could a Jew be an anti-Semite?", and responds that many Jews have "internalized elements of anti-Semitic discourse, succumbed to what Theodore Hamerow has called psychological surrender." Wasserstein goes on to say that self-hating Jews, "afflicted by some form of anti-Semitism[,] were not so much haters of themselves as haters of 'other' Jews."
- The historian Bernard Lewis described Jewish self-hatred as a neurotic reaction to the impact of antisemitism by Jews accepting, expressing, and even exaggerating, the basic assumptions of the antisemite.

== Controversy and criticism of the term ==
The legitimacy of the term in modern usage remains controversial. According to Jordie Gerson, published by My Jewish Learning: "Some scholars have claimed that by labeling another Jew self-hating, the accuser is claiming his or her own Judaism as normative–and implying that the Judaism of the accused is flawed or incorrect, based on a metric of the accuser's own stances, religious beliefs, or political opinions. By arguing with the label, then, the accused is rejecting what has been defined as normative Judaism. The term 'self-hating' thus places the person or object labeled outside the boundaries of the discourse–and outside the boundaries of the community." Ofri Ilany writes in Haaretz that the term is almost exclusively used today by the Jewish right against the Jewish left, and that within left-wing and liberal circles it is "usually considered a joke".

In a 2014 interview, Jon Stewart, former host of The Daily Show, said he had been called a "self-hating Jew" by ”right-wing Jews” whom he described as "fascistic". Considering the term to be like equating someone with the Jews who turned their backs on each other during the Holocaust, he said, "I have people that I lost in the Holocaust and I just ... go fuck yourself. How dare you?" Stewart commented that the way his critics used the term—to define who is a Jew and who is not—was formerly always done by people who were not Jewish. He saw this as "more than nationalism". Stewart also criticized right-wing Jews for implying that they are the only ones who can decide what it means to be Jewish. He observed: "And you can't observe Judaism in the way you want to observe. And I never thought that that would be coming from brethren. ... How dare they? That they only know the word of God and are the ones who are able to disseminate it. It's not right." To The Hollywood Reporter, he said, "Look, there's a lot of reasons why I hate myself—being Jewish isn't one of them."

In 2014, Noam Chomsky said that Zionists divided critics of Israeli policy into two groups: antisemitic non-Jews and neurotic self-hating Jews. He observed:

Actually, the locus classicus, the best formulation of this, was by an ambassador to the United Nations, Abba Eban, Israel's ambassador to the United Nations.... He advised the American Jewish community that they had two tasks to perform. One task was to show that criticism of the policy, what he called anti-Zionism—that means actually criticisms of the policy of the state of Israel—were anti-Semitism. That's the first task. Second task, if the criticism was made by Jews, their task was to show that it's neurotic self-hatred, needs psychiatric treatment. Then he gave two examples of the latter category. One was I. F. Stone. The other was me. So, we have to be treated for our psychiatric disorders, and non-Jews have to be condemned for anti-Semitism, if they're critical of the state of Israel. That's understandable why Israeli propaganda would take this position. I don't particularly blame Abba Eban for doing what ambassadors are sometimes supposed to do. But we ought to understand that there is no sensible charge. No sensible charge. There's nothing to respond to. It's not a form of anti-Semitism. It's simply criticism of the criminal actions of a state, period.

== Similar terms ==
"Self-loathing Jew" is synonymously used with "self-hating Jew." "Antisemitic Jew" can be used synonymously as well. "Self-hating Jew" has also been compared to the term "Uncle Tom" which is used in the African-American community. The term "auto-antisemitism" (Hebrew: אוטואנטישמיות, autoantishemiut) is also synonymously used in Hebrew. In a column in Haaretz, Uzi Zilber used the term "Jew Flu" as a synonym for Jewish self-hatred.

== See also ==
- Anti-Semite and Jew – 1946 book by Jean-Paul Sartre
- Association of German National Jews – 1920/30s German-Jewish assimilationist organization
- Internalized racism – Adherence to racist beliefs and customs by subordinated groups
- Kapo – Collaborationist prisoner at a Nazi camp
- Morenazi – Political slur for a non-white Nazi
- Three Ds of antisemitism – Criteria aiming to distinguish criticism of Israel from antisemitism
- White guilt – White people's guilt for racist harms
- Zionist antisemitism – Antisemitic supporters of Zionism and Israel
- Dan Burros – American Jewish neo-Nazi (1937–1965)
- Jake Lang – American far-right activist
