= Verbrechen und Wahnsinn beim Weibe =

1894 book by Paul Näcke

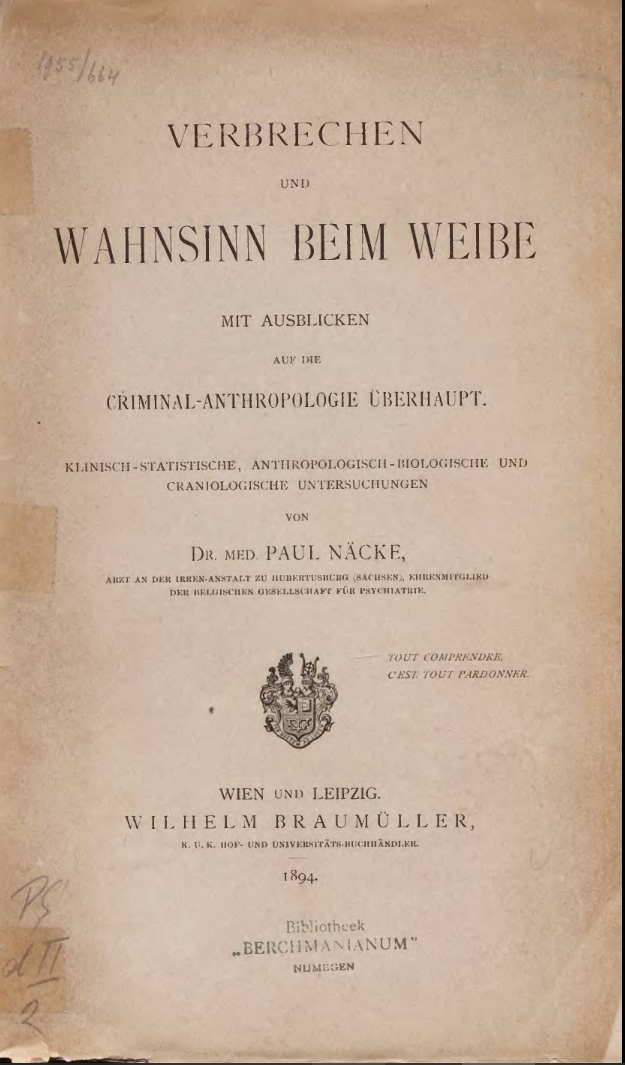
- Book Cover of the original version of Paul Näcke's book "Verbrechen und Wahnsinn beim Weibe" published in 1894
- Author: Dr med. Paul Näcke
- Language: German
- Publisher: Wilhelm Braumüller K.U.K Hof- und Universitäts-Buchhändler
- Publication date: 1894

Verbrechen und Wahnsinn beim Weibe mit Ausblicken auf die Criminal-Anthropologie überhaupt: klinisch-statistische, anthropologisch-biologische und craniologische Untersuchungen (translated: Crime and Insanity in women with an outlook on the criminal-anthropology overall: clinical-statistical, anthrological-biological and craniological investigation) is the first book written by Dr. med Paul Näcke (1851-1913), which was published in 1894. The author aims to fill the gaps present at the time into the research of mentally ill and criminal women based on his own psychiatric observations in the psychiatric institution Hubertusburg, making it unlike literature already available in the era. With his work Näcke goes against the predominant notion of the time that criminals are born, which was based in the positivist school movement at the time and initiated by the "father of criminology": Cesare Lombroso. The main ideas Näcke proposes in his work are that criminals who are insane at time of crime should not be punished as harshly and one should view criminals not solely as objects under the penalty of law but also as subjects who could potentially suffer from mental diseases.

== Context ==
In the time that Näcke published the book, the view on the mentally ill and the field of psychiatry as a whole changed fundamentally. Prior to the end of the 19th century the mentally insane were viewed as outcasts of society and often merged with criminals to be locked away from society. Prior to the publication of Näcke's work, the Italian doctor and professor Cesare Lombroso established the positivists criminology movement and the field of criminology. Lombroso's influential ideas included the notion of the "born criminal", believing that there are biological predisposition factors, making criminality heredity. Lombroso based his ideas on anatomical research into the physical attributed of criminals by for example measuring their skull size. These findings were used by him to argue that psychiatrists should be involved and consulted with in the criminal process. Despite his beliefs that people are predispositioned to be criminals, he did not support reduced penalties for criminals with a psychiatric disease. While opposing the idea of the 'born criminal', Näcke's ideas for the book and his future publications were largely influenced by the positivist movement. Apart from Verbrechen und Wahnsinn beim Weibe, Näcke and his friend justice and criminologist Hans Gross established the magazine Archiv für Kriminal-Anthropologie und Kriminalistik (translated: archive for criminal-anthropology and criminology) to give professionals surrounding the field of criminology a platform to discuss their new ideas and scientific findings to bring the field forward. This platform was also used to discuss and criticize Näcke's book and future works of his. During his time at Hubertusburg, Näcke frequently worked with female perpetrators inspiring him to do more research into the differences of insane females, taking into account that most research into mentally ill patients was based on a predominantly male sample, which is pointed out in the preface of his book.

In the preface of the book, Näcke gives the reader a clear idea on what he is aiming to achieve with his book. He mentioned that he has been noticing an increase in crime and the number of insane people and wants to shine light on the issues analytically and discuss possible ways of solving it. The book is written with the intention to mainly address academics and professionals in the field of medicine, especially psychiatry, legislators, theologians and pedagogues because the book is pointed at merging all these topics together. In his work as a psychiatrist at Hubertusburg he has noticed that some criminals are psychiatrically ill at the time of crime, while others develop psychosis in the penal institutions. With his book he wants to help judges and legislators to rethink punishing mentally ill as harshly as the average criminal while also pointing at the negative overall treatment patients endure at penal institutions. The lack of research into female perpetrators is also addressed by the book and it tries to draw comparisons to already established research about criminal and mentally ill males to see if there are any major differences. While presenting Näcke's research and observations the book circles back to the works of other researchers to compare the findings and claims made by the book. Despite trying to refute most of Lombroso's core ideas, it is largely influenced by Lombroso's works and the positivist movement as a whole.

== Content ==
The seven chapters of the book are structured from initially giving observational reports into the psychiatric anamnesis and personal history of a hundred female patients, he encountered at Hubertusburg, into a statistical analysis of the data and then in the later chapter he goes into the larger implications these findings have for how to accommodate criminals and the topic of psychosis in penal institutions.

In the initial chapter of the book, Näcke recalls observational data from a hundred women that were treated at Hubertusburg and based on that he later makes a statistical analysis on differing factors. His accumulated dataset includes the women's occupation, marital status, family history, evaluation of intelligence and character, as well as a psychiatric/ symptomatic history and crimes that were committed. While he disputes the idea that perpetrators can be recognized by their bodily features (for example: skull size, teeth), he still includes prominent bodily features he notices of the women.

In the second part of his book, he compares his statistical analysis to the ones of researcher that came before him. He discusses various topics for example if masturbation or if the number of illegitimate children is a significant factor leading to insanity. He theorizes that around a quarter of women were wrongfully committed because they were insane at the time of the crime and should therefore not have been persecuted. While he believes that longer prison sentences correlate with higher chances of psychosis, he is certain that women are predispositioned to get a psychosis and the penal institution is not the leading cause. Nevertheless, he pleads for new accommodations for insane people that are more centralized and the separation of criminals and mentally ill patients. He suggests that there is a bidirectional relationship between crime and insanity but still holding insane people in the same facilities as purely criminal people with interfere with the patients treatments. In his last chapters he gives his biological perspectives on the observational data.

== Reception ==
The book Verbrechen und Wahnsinn beim Weibe was given positive reviews at the time by the magazine The Monist, portraying the work as having "high usefulness and value" for the field of criminology because it investigates the topic of female perpetrators very analytically. They claim that the book could influence legislation and other fields immensely while the book itself is rather written for professionals of psychiatry and criminology and not for laymen per se.

Näcke's book was also reviewed by his colleague Dr. Hans Gross in their journal: Archiv für Kriminal-Anthropologie und Kriminalistik. Gross points out that Näcke's "excellent book" serves as a great resource on how to deal with insane women based on a statistical analysis of observational data. In Gross' opinion the book will help to educate the legislative power of how an "unsound" mind works and helps as evidence to have judges let psychiatrists assess perpetrators for insanity. Gross also highlights the importance of Näcke's research into discrediting Lombroso's idea of a born criminal.

The book's ideas and research into female perpetrators were perceived as remarkable when the book was initially published because it was standard at the time to solely consider male subjects for research. Näcke's research was mainly addressed at professionals of criminology and psychiatry. He was viewed as an authority in research in the fields of criminology, sexology and homosexuality at his time of influence. He was criticized for not going into depth in most of his research, this was mainly due to the fact that Näcke's interests were so widespread that he never could go deeper than surface level in most of his works.

The book's aim, to shine light on the understudied field of insane women, was achieved, making it a unique work of research. While the author was largely forgotten, the ideas Näcke established with his book and his future publications still largely influence the field of psychiatry and psychology in the 21st century. For example, the concepts of narcissism and extended suicide are based on the works of Näcke. With this book, Näcke succeeded in coining the view to perceive criminals not solely as objects under the penalty of law but also as subjects who could potentially suffer from mental diseases. The main topics of the book, including the view that mentally ill have diminished responsibility in the crimes that they commit, persists into the 21st century and the notion to abolish the death penalty due to its inhumanness was also a revolutionary thought at the time of the book's publication. With his work on Verbrechen und Wahnsinn beim Weibe Näcke also gave one of the first statistical analyses on female perpetrators, suggesting that one has to differentiate between female and male criminals. In his book he also proposes to differentiate between criminals and mentally ill people and treat them in different institutions. Like Lombroso, he also puts forward the idea that a criminal should be psychiatrically assessed before a penalty is decided upon. Verbrechen und Wahnsinn beim Weibe enabled Näcke to investigate other fields of his interests, making him one of the first researchers addressing the topics of sexology and homosexuality. Näcke opposed the death penalty but was a supporter of the castration and sterilization of disabled and chronically mentally ill patients to uphold the 'social order'. As well as being a proponent of the emergent view of eugenics, he also supported social darwinism and the ideas that the struggle for existence also applies to humankind.
