= Paul Näcke =

German psychiatrist (b. 1851, d. 1913)

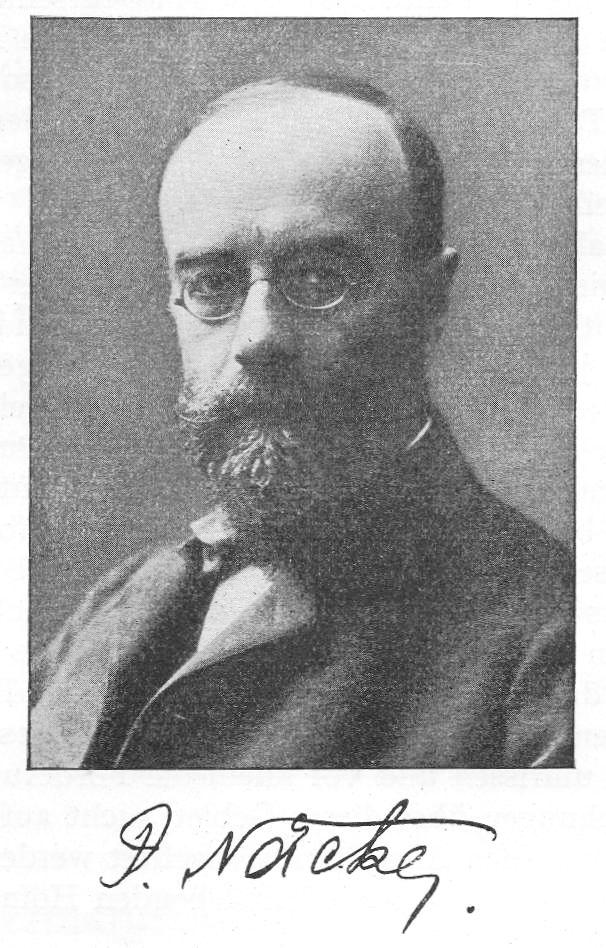
Paul Näcke

Paul Adolf Näcke (23 January 1851, Saint Petersburg – 18 August 1913, Colditz) was a German psychiatrist and criminologist. Näcke is known for his writings on homosexuality, and coining the term narcissism in 1899 to describe someone who treated his body as a sexual object.

== Career ==
He received his doctorate in 1873 in Würzburg, titled (English title translated): "About intestinal perforation and typhoid abdominalis". He worked in various Parisian hospitals; later he took an interest in psychiatry. In 1912 he became the director of the psychiatric hospital at Colditz Castle. Näcke, along with Hans Gross, a professor of criminology, founded the archive of criminal anthropology and criminology in Dresden in 1898. In 1884 Näcke wrote the first monograph on women's crime in Germany. He suggested a "sensible emancipation of women", which was groundbreaking for the time, but did not mean equal rights. Näcke is considered a strong opponent of positive criminology, that was founded by Cesare Lombroso. Näcke described Lombroso's work as marked by "arbitrariness, exaggerations, [and] jumping to conclusions" According to Näcke, criminals are the product of external influences, and not only biological influences as thought by Lombroso. This does not mean that Näcke disapproved of a biological basis for crime altogether. His argument is that every human being is a "latent criminal". Näcke was one of the first advocates of the sterilization of "degenerate criminals" and "degenerates" in general. He saw it as a public duty to make "degenerates" infertile. By 1900, he published a work entitled The castration of certain classes of degenerates as an effective way of social protection (title translated) Näcke wrote on the subject of a Jewish character, which was described only in vague and general features, and considered that character as a reason for crimes committed by Jews. Näcke stated his position in 1899: "the State has the holy duty to intervene... and to prevent through legislation the increase of the degenerated elements. Such an intervention would aim at the removal of a big cancer in our national body". He asserted that only castration could guarantee that this task was fulfilled both effectively and in the "easiest, cheapest way". In 1912, Näcke wrote against the then common diagnosis of "moral insanity". He developed the idea that homosexuality should not be regarded as a mental illness, but as an innate natural property. He described male menstruation as clear evidence of a continuum between male and female sexuality.

== Personal life ==
Paul Näcke was born in 1851, the son of a German father and a French mother. Näcke is said to have mastered seven languages. Näcke was married since 1886 and had several children. Throughout his life he suffered from a neurasthenia, also known as effort syndrome. Näcke died on 18 August 1913 of heart failure due to atherosclerosis.

== Bibliography ==
- Crime and madness in the woman, 1894
- On Criminal Psychology, 1896
- Literature report. Criminal anthropology and prison science / journal for criminal science, 1897
- Criminal Anthropology / Annual Report for Neurology and Psychiatry, 1898
- Castration in Certain Classes of Degenerates as an Effective Social Protection / Archive for Criminal Anthropology and criminology, 1900
- The accommodation of mentally ill criminals, 1902
- About so-called "Moral Insanity", 1902
- Émile Zola. His relationship to crime anthropology and sociology / Archive for Criminal Anthropology and criminology, 1903
- Are the signs of degeneration really worthless? Quarterly Journal of Judicial Medicine and Public Sanitation, 1905
- On the alleged degeneration of Romanesque peoples, 1906
- About family murder by mental patients, 1908
- Classification of Homosexuals / General Journal of Psychiatry, 1908
- About Homosexuality in Albania, 1908
- The brain surface of paralytic, 1909
- The Diagnosis of Homosexuality, 1909
- On the Shakespeare Bacon Question, 1910
- Warning about the sudden adoption of sadism and masochism / Archive for Criminal Anthropology and criminology, 1911
- Auto-Sadism and Suicide / Archive for Criminal Anthropology and criminology 1911
