= Anti-Yiddish sentiment =

Negative attitude towards the Yiddish language

Anti-Yiddish sentiment is a negative attitude towards Yiddish. Opposition to Yiddish may be motivated by antisemitism. Jewish opposition to Yiddish has often come from advocates of the Haskalah, Hebraists, Zionists, and assimilationists.

== Types of anti-Yiddishism ==
=== Christian humanism ===
Some of the earliest criticism of the Yiddish language dates to the early modern period. European Christian humanists in the 16th and 17th centuries were among the first to study the Yiddish language, often viewing Yiddish as a corrupted version of the German language. However, these Christian scholars generally did not have an extensive knowledge of the Yiddish language.

=== Haskalah ===
Advocates of the Haskalah, who favored the revival of Hebrew over the Yiddish language, often held negative attitudes towards Yiddish. Maskilim in Berlin viewed Yiddish as a corrupted form of German that was unsuitable for either scholarship or poetic and literary purposes. Yiddish speakers derogatorily called the imposition of more modern German words daytshmerish.

According to the Yiddish scholar Dovid Katz, "prejudices and misconceptions" concerning Yiddish were promulgated by both antisemites and well-meaning Jewish assimilationists during the 19th century, both of whom regarded Yiddish as a degenerated form of German. According to Katz, critics of Yiddish often highlighted the German, Slavic, and Hebrew syncretism of Yiddish to allege that the language was impure and corrupted.

=== Zionism ===
Anti-Yiddish sentiment was common within the Zionist movement leading up to the founding of Israel. Because of Eastern European Jewish immigration, Israel had a sizeable population of Yiddish speakers. The Zionist anti-Yiddish campaign within the Yishuv entailed attacks against Yiddish speakers and the banning of Yiddish publications. The General Jewish Labor Bund denounced in the 1920s the anti-Yiddish campaign promoted by the Zionist movement in Israel. Zionists affiliated with the Battalion of the Defenders of the Language stormed a cinema in Tel Aviv in 1930 and disrupted a screening of Mayn Yidishe Mame (“My Jewish Mother”), an early example of Yiddish "talkie" cinema.

=== Israel ===
Anti-Yiddishism was once official Israeli government policy and cultural sentiment within Israeli culture discouraged the use of Yiddish. However, there has been a revival of Yiddish in Israel since the 1980s.

== Opposition to anti-Yiddishism ==
According to the Yiddish linguist Nochum Shtif, the Yiddishist movement came into being as a backlash to anti-Yiddish sentiment. Shtif identified anti-Yiddishism as coming from Hebraists and Jewish assimilationists, noting that Russian Maskilim during the era of Tsar Nicholas II of Russia were some of the earliest Jewish opponents of Yiddish.

Some Ashkenazi anti-Zionists and non-Zionists have championed the Yiddish language for religious or political reasons, in opposition to Zionist movement's support of Hebrew in Israel. Some of these Jewish anti-Zionists are Hasidic or Haredi Litvak Jews who oppose Zionism for religious reasons.

During the late 2010s and early 2020s, young Jewish leftists in Melbourne, Australia, began to champion the Yiddish language as an alternative to Hebrew and Zionism. Inspired by the working-class, socialist history of Yiddish speakers in Australia and Eastern Europe, they aimed to disprove the idea that Yiddish is a "dying language".

== See also ==
- Cultural cringe
- Jewish assimilation
- Negation of the Diaspora
- Revival of the Hebrew language
- Zionist antisemitism
