= Negation of the Diaspora =

Aspect of the Zionist ideology rejecting Jewish diasporism and/or diaspora

"Negation of the Diaspora" (Hebrew: שלילת הגלות Shlilat ha-Galut or שלילת הגולה Shlilat ha-Golah) is a concept in Zionism that asserts that Jews living in the Diaspora—that is, outside of the Land of Israel—are in an environment that inherently causes Jewish assimilation, particularly through discrimination and persecution, and which must be fixed to ensure the survival and the cohesion of the Jews as a people. A more developed formulation of the idea further argues that the Jewish people have no future without amassing at their "spiritual centre" in the Land of Israel, which is partly represented by the modern State of Israel.

Aliyah (עֲלִיָּה, lit. 'ascent [to Zion]'), the historic Hebrew term for an expatriate Jew's immigration to the Land of Israel, is an act that fulfills this Zionist tenet by enabling the "gathering of Israel" and thus undoing any perceived Jewish assimilation. Yerida (יְרִידָה, lit. 'descent [from Zion]'), the historic Hebrew term for a Jew's emigration from the Land of Israel, is the exact opposite—it is now widely understood as referring to Israeli Jews who live outside of their country.

== Origin ==
The earliest publication of the concept in Zionist discourse was in a series of public exchanges between Simon Dubnow and Ahad Ha'am, beginning in 1901. Ha'am's 1909 Hebrew-language essay Negation of the Diaspora fixed the phrase in Zionist public terminology.

== Before 1948: the Diaspora ==
=== Perceived decline of Jewish civilization ===
According to Eliezer Schweid, in the early 20th century, Yosef Haim Brenner and Micha Josef Berdyczewski advocated an extreme form of the concept. In his literary work, Brenner describes Jews in the Pale of Settlement as poor; mentally, morally, and spiritually disfigured; panicky; humiliated; disoriented, with no realistic view of life; depressed; despised; slovenly of dress, lacking taste; unwilling to defend themselves against violence, desperate; and simultaneously feeling inferior and part of a Chosen people. According to Schweid, Brenner thought that their despair was good, as it would leave Jews with Zionism as their only option for ethnic, cultural, and religious revitalization.

Yehezkel Kaufmann saw Jews in the Diaspora as territorially assimilated and as religiously segregated yet semi-assimilated, with even their Jewish languages being the result of mixing their sacred Hebrew with local language. Kaufmann viewed this Diaspora culture as flawed, misshapen, poor, and restricted; although Diaspora Jews in Europe found it easier to assimilate once ghettos were abolished and as the larger cultures around them secularized, the fact was that European culture remained essentially Christian.

==== Restoration of Jews and Judaism in Palestine ====
Ha'am and A. D. Gordon held a more moderate view in that they still saw some positive traits or possibilities of life in the Diaspora. As he thought the creation of a Jewish homeland in Palestine would take several generations, Ha'am wanted to improve life in the Diaspora by creating a "spiritual centre" in Palestine, where Jewish civilization and Judaism could be revived, giving Jews more self-confidence and helping them resist foreign assimilation, which he saw as a deformation of the personality and as a moral failing with regard to family and people. He believed that Jews should feel historical continuity and organic belonging to a people. Gordon perceived nature as an organic unity. He preferred organic bonds in society, like those of family, community, and nation, over "mechanical" bonds, like those of state, party, and class. Since Jews were cut off from their nation, they were cut off from the experience of sanctity and the existential bond with the infinite. In the Diaspora, a Jew was cut off from direct contact with nature. Jews in exile, Gordon wrote, had reached a point where:

[W]e are a parasitic people. We have no roots in the soil, there is no ground beneath our feet. And we are parasites not only in an economic sense, but in spirit, in thought, in poetry, in literature, and in our virtues, our ideals, our higher human aspirations. Every alien movement sweeps us along, every wind in the world carries us. We in ourselves are almost non-existent, so of course we are nothing in the eyes of other people either.

The poet Hayim Nahman Bialik wrote:

And my heart weeps for my unhappy people ...
How burned, how blasted must our portion be,
If seed like this is withered in its soil. ...

According to Schweid, Bialik meant that the "seed" was the potential of the Jewish people, which they preserved in the Diaspora, where it could only give rise to deformed results. However, once conditions changed, the "seed" could still provide a plentiful harvest. Schweid says the concept of the organic unity of the nation is the common denominator of Ha'am's, Gordon's, and Bialik's views, which prevents them from completely rejecting life in the Diaspora.

As a pupil in an elementary school in Palestine I was imbued with this contemptuous attitude. Everything “exilic” was beneath contempt: the Jewish shtetl, Jewish religion, Jewish prejudices and superstitions. We learned that “exilic” Jews were engaged in “air businesses” – parasitical stock exchange deals that did not produce anything real, that Jews shunned physical work, that their social setup was a “reverse pyramid”, which we were to overturn by creating a healthy society of peasants and workers. [...]
Everything good and healthy was Hebrew – the Hebrew community, Hebrew agriculture, Hebrew kibbutzim, the “First Hebrew City” (Tel Aviv), the Hebrew underground military organizations, the future Hebrew state. Jewish were “exilic” things like religion, tradition and useless stuff like that.

— Uri Avnery, born in 1923.

Ze'ev Sternhell distinguishes two schools of thought in Zionism: one was the liberal or utilitarian school of Theodor Herzl and Max Nordau, who argued that antisemitism, especially after the Dreyfus affair, would never disappear and thus looked to Zionism as a rational solution for Jews; the other, prevalent among Palestinian Zionists, saw Zionism as a project to rescue the Jewish nation (the "Rebirth of the Nation") and not as a project to rescue Jews. David Ben-Gurion, in a collection of speeches and essays known as Rebirth and Destiny of Israel, describes his horror after discovering, shortly after he arrived in Ottoman Palestine in 1906, that an agricultural Jewish settlement had employed Arabs as guards: "Was it conceivable that here too we should be deep in Galuth [exile], hiring strangers to guard our property and protect our lives?"

=== Antisemitism and the "new Jew" ===
The question of security, apart from the shame of the Jewish inability to defend their lives and honour during pogroms, was not central to their thinking. For instance, in 1940, Berl Katznelson wrote about Polish Jews who were living in regions that had been conquered by the Soviet Union: "[They] are unable to fight even for a few days for small things like Hebrew schools. In my opinion that is a terrible tragedy, no less than the trampling of Jewry by Hitler's Jackboots."

According to Frankel, some Zionists of the Second Aliyah, such as Ya'akov Zerubavel, advocated a new Jewish mentality that would replace the perceived old one. The old, exilic mentality was one of passivity, of awaiting salvation from the Heavens. According to Zerubavel, after the Bar Kokhba revolt began, "the tragedy of our (Jews') passivity." For him, to work the soil in the Land of Israel, to settle the country and to defend the settlements, was a complete break with the exile and meant picking up the thread where it had been dropped after the Jewish national defeat to the Roman Empire. The Jew with the new mentality would fight to defend himself. Ben-Gurion says, "To act as a guard in Eretz Israel is the boldest and freest deed in Zionism." Zerubavel wrote that the remark by which a fallen guard named Yehezkel Ninasov was remembered had revealed the image of being a guard in all its glory. Ninasov had once said: "How is it that you are still alive and your animals are gone? Shame on you!" According to Brenner, "[the pioneers in Palestine are] a new type among the Jews."

In an address to the youth section of the Jewish political party Mapai in 1944, Ben-Gurion stated:

Exile is one with utter dependence—in material things, in politics and culture, in ethics and intellect, and they must be dependent who are an alien minority, who have no Homeland and are separated from their origins, from the soil and labour, from economic creativity. So we must become the captains of our fortunes, we must become independent—not only in politics and economy but in spirit, feeling and will.

According to Sternhell, Zionism's views underlying the negation of the Diaspora (e.g., the view of the Jews as a parasitic people) were often quite similar to the opinions underlying modern European antisemitism.

Negation of the Diaspora is the complementary facet to developing the ethos of the Israeli sabra. This facet is part of the secular counterculture that was the basis for the rise of the original Israeli culture and Israeli national identity. Ideologically, the negation of the diaspora explains the deep disgust towards emigration from Israel. From an economic standpoint, the negation of the Diaspora appears as the abandonment of the Jewish middleman minority economy as an unproductive business, colloquially known as an "air business" or "luftgeschaeft", and switching to productive professions.

=== Hebraization and Canaanism ===
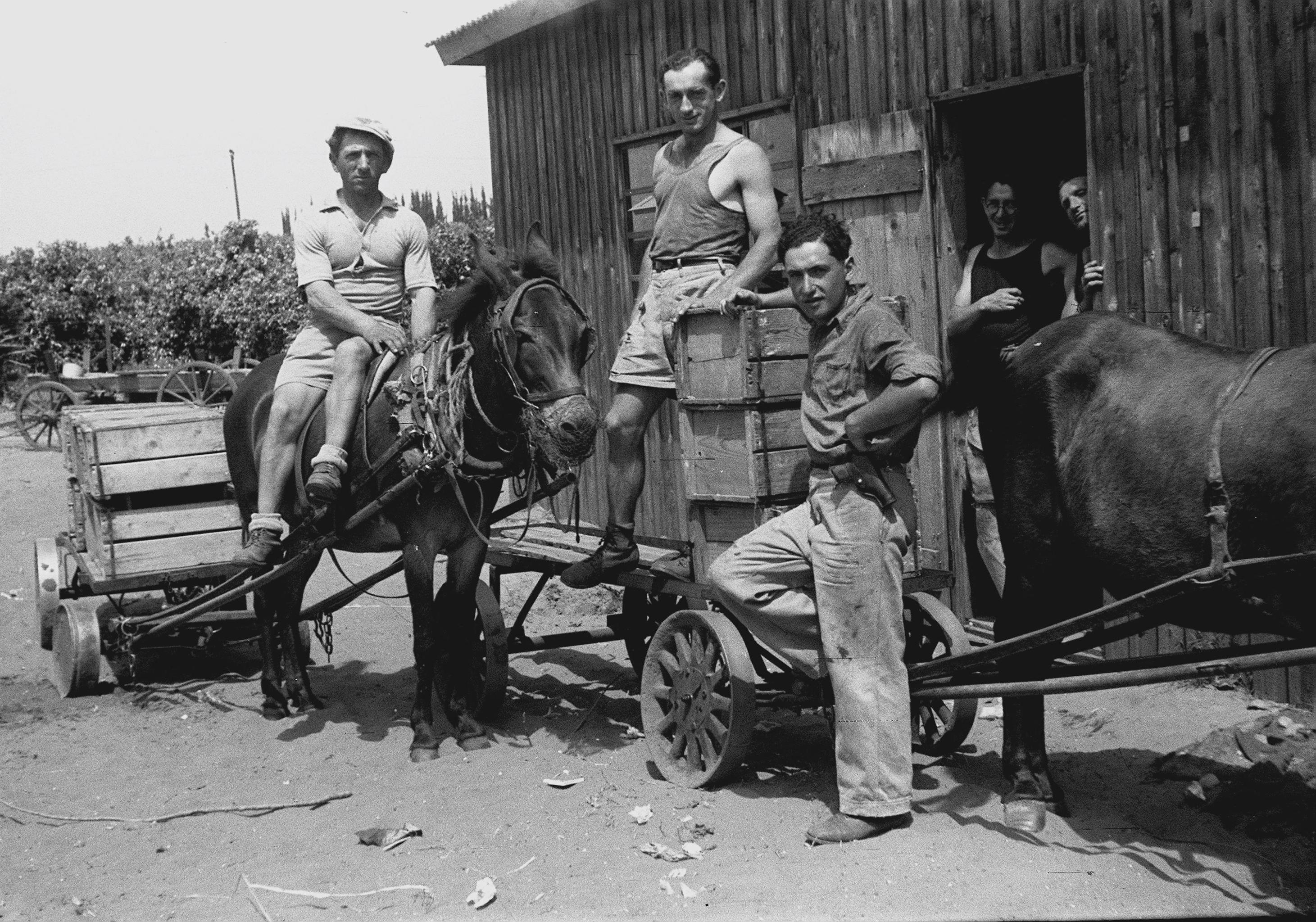
Workers in Kfar Saba. Between 1930 and 1940

According to Itamar Even-Zohar, in the late 19th century, secular Jews in Eastern Europe saw Jewish culture as in a state of decline or even degeneration. Some wanted to assimilate completely. The Zionists sought a return to the "purity" and "authenticity" of the existence of the "Hebrew nation in its land", a pastoral vision reflecting contemporary Romantic ideals.

This vision manifested itself by counterposing "new Hebrew" to "old Diaspora Jew" in various ways. Even-Zohar mentions several:

- the transition to physical labour, mainly agriculture or "working the land", as it was called;
- self-defense, and the concomitant use of arms;
- the supplanting of the old, "contemptible" Diaspora language (i.e., Yiddish) with the new "authentic" tongue of Modern Hebrew, adopting the Sephardi pronunciation rather than the Ashkenazi pronunciation;
- discarding traditionally European dress and adopting other Middle Eastern fashions, like those of the Bedouin Arabs and the Circassians; and
- dropping Eastern European family names (often based on German or Russian) and adopting Hebrew names instead.

This rejection of the Diaspora, for some, such as the Canaanists (who originated from Revisionist Zionism), extended to the rejection of the close and intimate ties between the culture practiced by most self-identified Jews and the reclaiming of Jewish culture as a "Hebrew culture" that would become agnostic to religious affiliation, rely upon the Land of Israel and its ancient cultures as a prime factor in self-identification as a Hebrew rather than as Jew, and even seek for assimilation of the Arab residents into the larger Hebrew culture. This extreme negation of both the Diaspora and Judaism would not become popular among even secular Zionists, but it would continue to resurface in nationalistic thought to the present day.

The saying, "Eliminate the Diaspora, or the Diaspora will surely eliminate you," is often wrongly attributed to Ze'ev Jabotinsky, the founder of Revisionist Zionism, in a dispute with Ben-Gurion; it was actually the historian Joseph Klausner who formulated the remark in these terms during a speech he gave in Jerusalem in 1942.

== After 1948: the State of Israel ==
=== Diaspora Jews and Israeli Jews ===
According to Schweid, since about 1970, the idea of the negation of the Diaspora was removed from the basic premises guiding Israeli national education. One reason for this was the need of Israel to "reconcile" itself with Jews in the Diaspora.

In 2007, the Israeli government began a campaign to encourage Jews from the former Soviet Union who were living in Germany to emigrate to Israel, in order to "counter [their] dangerous assimilation."

=== Impact on Judaism ===
The anti-Diaspora position is present within Israeli literature to this day, with Israeli author A. B. Yehoshua being considered chief of this sentimental strain; Yehoshua has often been recorded or cited as critical of Diasporic Judaism as being inauthentic and rootless in comparison to Israeli Judaism, and the Judaism-tinged Diaspora existence as being stifling to the identity and conviviality of secular Jewish culture.

== See also ==
- Golus nationalism, an anti-Zionist Jewish nationalist ideology rooted in pro-Diaspora sentiment
- Muscular Judaism, a Zionist philosophical term stressing the need for mental and physical strength among Jews
  - Useful Jew, a term for Jews who would be exploited by non-Jews to help enforce anti-Jewish policies
- Anti-Yiddish sentiment, the opposition among Jews towards the Yiddish language in Europe
- The Jewish question, a centuries-long European debate on the status and presence of Jews
  - Antisemitic Zionism, the antisemites who are pro-Zionist only because it advocates Jewish emigration from their society to Israel

== Bibliography ==
- Ben-Gurion, 1959, 'Rebirth and destiny of Israel', Thomas Yoseloff Ltd., London
- Schweid, Eliezer (1996). "Rejection of the Diaspora in Zionist Thought". In Reinharz; Shapira (eds.). Essential Papers on Zionism. ISBN 0-8147-7449-0.
- Z. Sternhell, The founding myths of Israel: nationalism, socialism, and the making of the Jewish state. Princeton, NJ: Princeton University Press, 1998. p. 3-36. ISBN 0-691-01694-1
