= Nietzschean Zionism =

Nietzsche's influence on Zionist thought

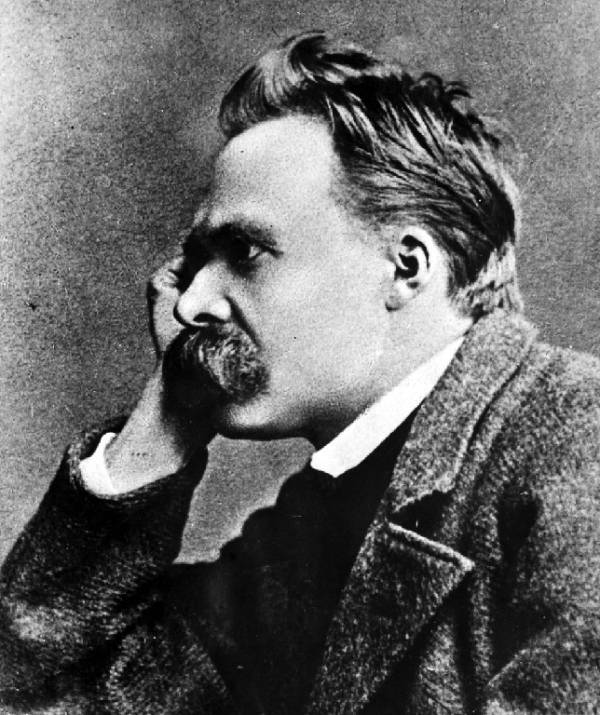
German Philosopher Friedrich Nietzsche

Nietzschean Zionism was a movement arising from the influence that the German philosopher Friedrich Nietzsche had on Zionism and several of its influential thinkers. Zionism was the movement for the attainment of freedom for the Jewish people through the establishment of a Jewish state. Friedrich Nietzsche's philosophy was popular among Jewish intellectuals, and therefore incorporated into Zionism relatively effortlessly.

Friedrich Nietzsche's influence was expressed by a desire to move away from the Jewish past into an empowering future for the Hebraic New Man, the adoption of his ideas necessitating the Jews to surpass the antiquarian Jewish identity that had a rabbinical consciousness at its center. The philosopher's influence on the Zionists can then be thought of as an existential revolution–that is, it focused on the renewal of the Jewish identity, the adoption of aesthetic values, and enhancing the will for life. The Zionist revolution emphasized that “the new Jews," the concept of which was similar to Nietzsche's “new European man,” should choose to go to Zion or stay in Europe. Theodor Herzl, “the author and the vision of the Jewish State,” viewed Zionism as the arrival of an authentic image of the Jew in a state without the idea of God or any dogmatization, exhibiting a very similar format to that of Nietzsche's libertarianism or anti-dogmatism.

== Figures ==
=== Theodor Herzl ===
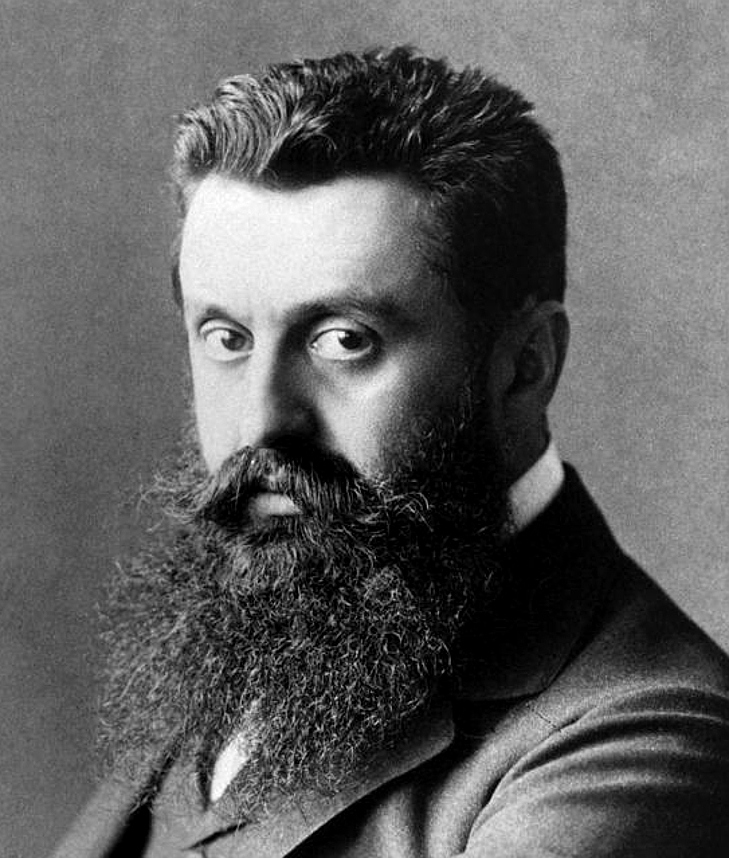
Zionist Leader Theodor Herzl

Theodor Herzl, founder and president of the Zionist Organization, which helped establish a Jewish state, felt ambivalent about Friedrich Nietzsche's ideology, owing to Nietzsche's history of mental health issues.

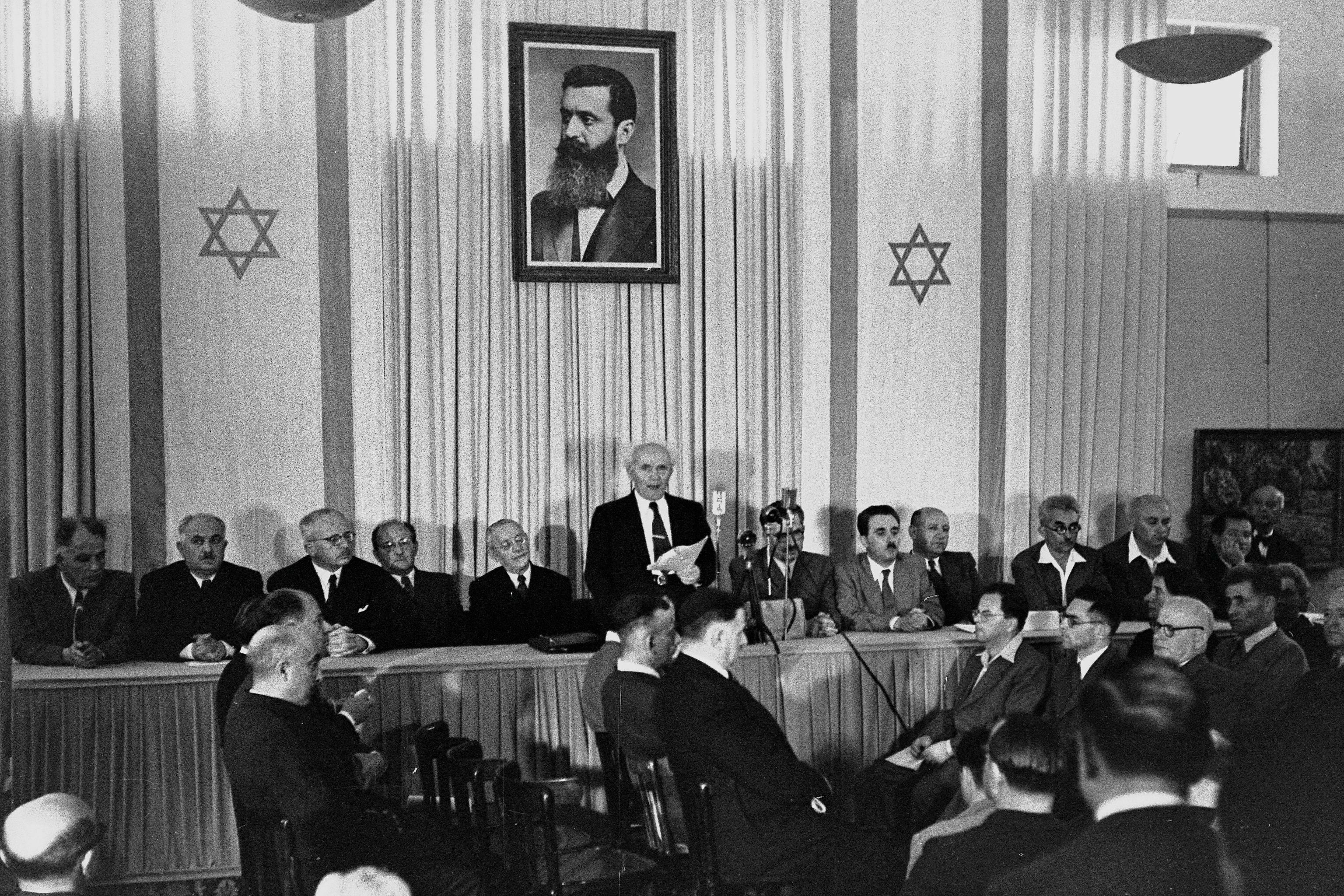
David Ben-Gurion, under a portrait of Theodor Herzl, is proclaiming Israel's independence

Even so, Herzl's idea of the “new Jew” was profoundly similar to that of Nietzsche's “new European man” or Übermensch. The character Jacob Samuel from Herzl's play Das Neue Ghetto resembles Zarathustra from Nietzsche's philosophical novel Thus Spoke Zarathustra. Jacob's ideals surpass those of the herd mentality. He is proud and demonstrates no resentment, seeks to implement no values and morals, and is on a journey of overcoming his old self–Zarathustra had already displayed his ideals. In Der Judenstaat, Herzl states, “If I wish to substitute a new building for an old one, I must demolish before I construct.” Nietzsche originally in On The Genealogy of Morals states, “If a temple is to be erected, a temple must be destroyed.” Hence, Nietzsche's ideology on a journey toward authenticity may have heavily influenced Herzl in both his novels and personal life.

Herzl refers to Plato, Arthur Schopenhauer, Immanuel Kant, Georg Wilhelm Friedrich Hegel, Aristotle, Ludwig Feuerbach, Franz Brentano, Johann Gottlieb Fichte, and Friedrich Wilhelm Joseph Schelling in his Jugendtagebuch. Also, in his diary he quotes several Enlightenment philosophers such as Voltaire, Jean-Jacques Rousseau, and Immanuel Kant. Nietzsche was not mentioned in either case. Also, Nietzsche's “European man” could not be generalized to the situation of the Jews in Europe. Since the Jewish population was unable to assimilate and prosper in Europe, Herzl then believed that the Jew could reach authenticity elsewhere, namely in Zion. If so, his ideology does not align with Nietzsche's “European man”, as Nietzsche's purpose is to surpass values and morals, not to move elsewhere to find authenticity. Even though Nietzsche may have influenced Herzl's ideals, he may have been a temporary scaffold into creating the image of genuine authenticity.

=== Martin Buber ===
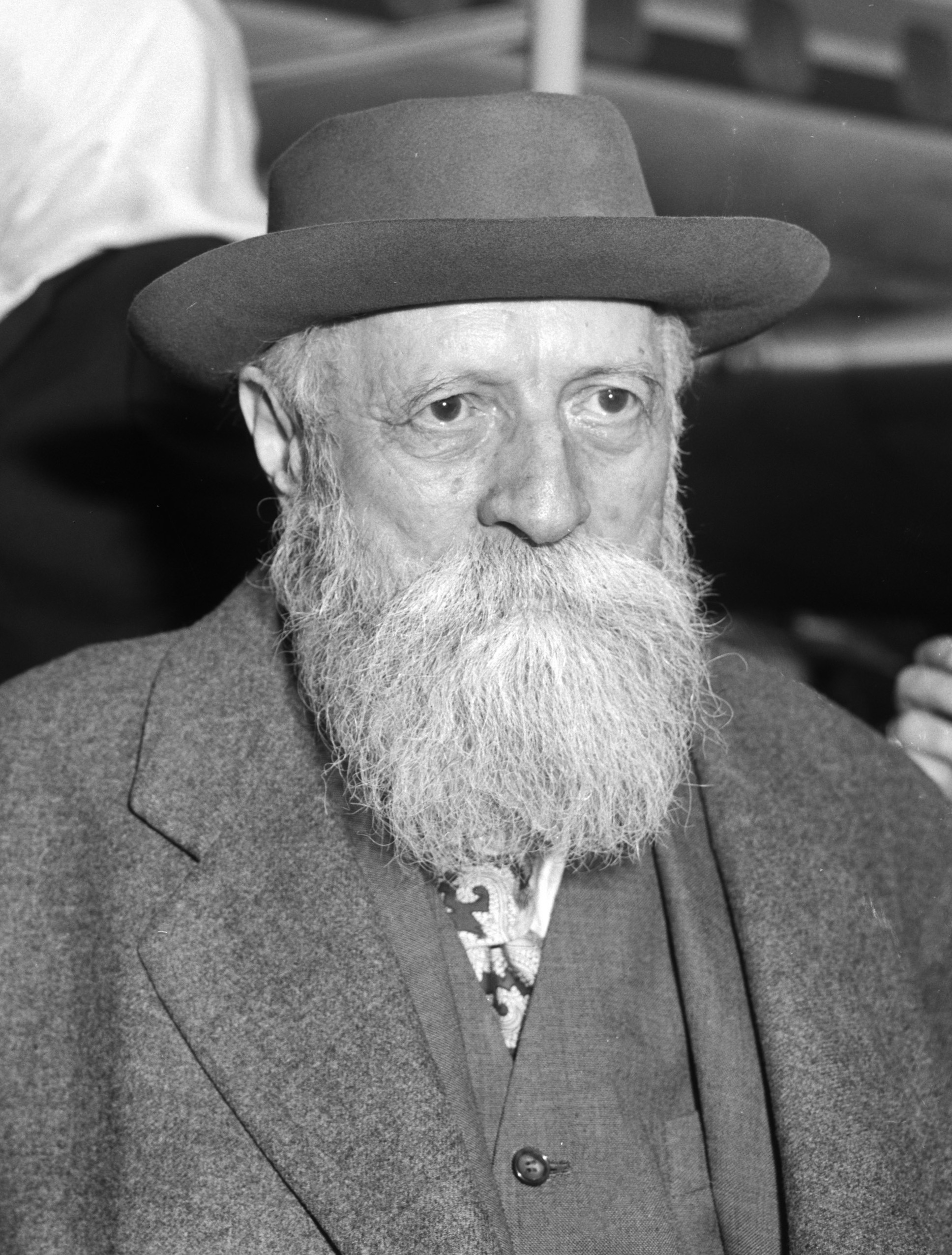
Professor Martin Buber

Martin Buber, who is claimed to be responsible for incorporating Friedrich Nietzsche into German Zionism, thought that Nietzsche portrayed the role of an individual able to create and go beyond himself. This he believed to be necessary for the Jewish renaissance. The two thousand years of the Jewish diaspora, Buber maintained, transformed physical energy into spiritual energy within the Jews. The essential drive of the Jewish renaissance was to release the spiritual energy—something that Nietzsche wrote extensively on, believing that conserving the spirit internalizes one's instincts which are then turned against oneself. Nietzsche thought the correct action to take after de-spiritualization is to advance one's aesthetic drive. This, in turn, was a consequence of the Jewish renaissance. In relation to Buber, he created an exhibition of contemporary Jewish art. Buber's vision emphasized the notion of reconciling the Jewish people to a life of creativeness, happiness, and healthiness. These values that Buber believed in may have been influenced by Friedrich Nietzsche's aesthetic work The Birth of Tragedy. Buber was well aware that Nietzsche used the philosopher Arthur Schopenhauer to mold his authentic self; likewise, Buber used Nietzsche for the same reason. Buber, after reaching and understanding the personal authenticity that Nietzsche extensively emphasized, jettisoned the philosopher from his life, as Buber believed that for one to grow truly fond of Nietzsche one must desert him.

=== Chaim Weizmann ===
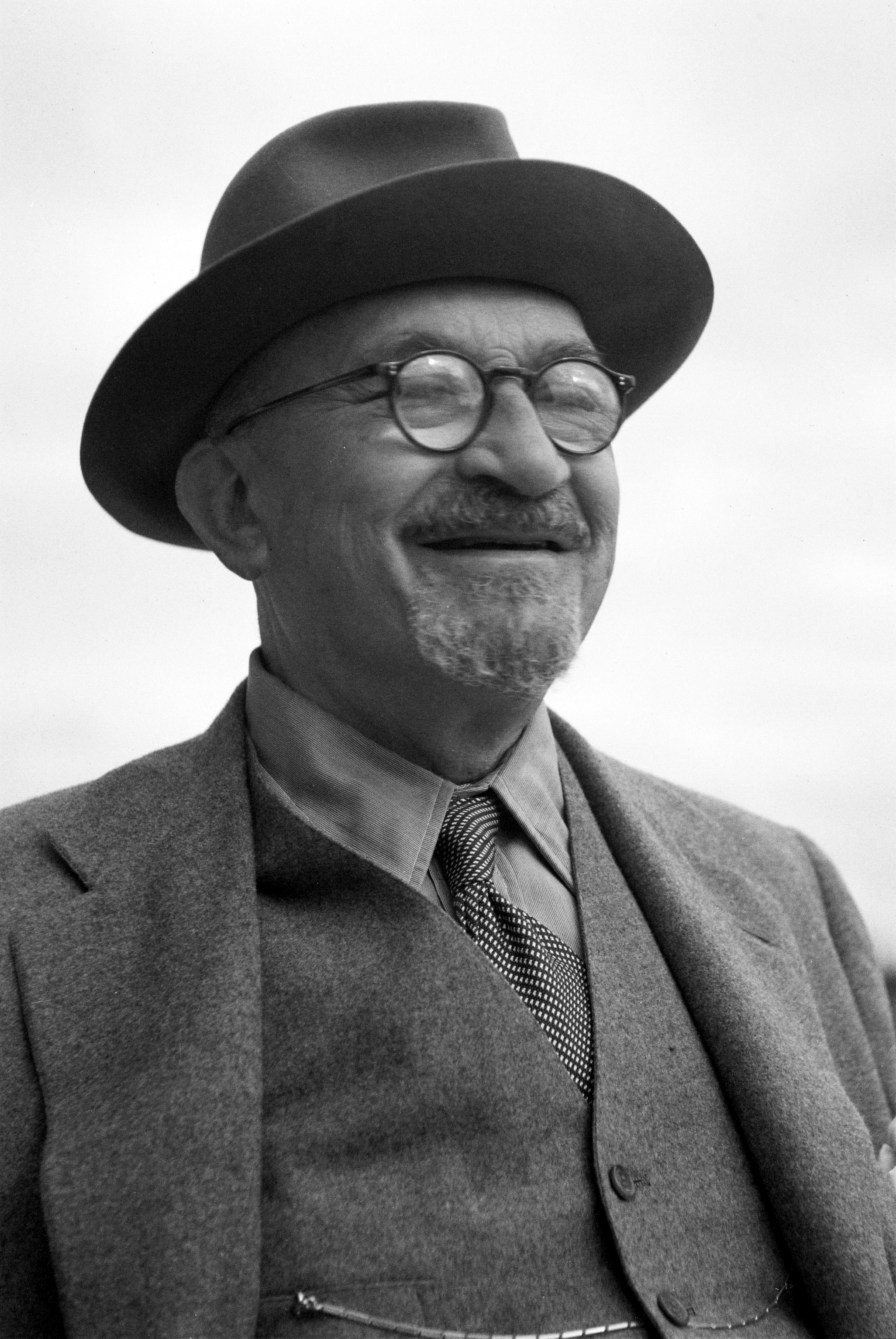
Israel's First President Chaim Weizmann

Chaim Weizmann, leader of the Zionist movement and future first president of the State of Israel, was influenced by the writings of Friedrich Nietzsche, believing that the Jews lacked power and seeing in Zionism a phenomenon that would steer the Jews toward power and freeing themselves. Whether Weizmann's intention was conscious or not, his ideas relate to Nietzsche's ideal of the Übermensch. Although he believed that the Jews contained sufficient intellect to understand and incorporate the writings of Nietzsche into their lives, Weizmann believed this could not be done on a mass-scale.

== See also ==
- Muscular Judaism
