= Sander Gilman =

American cultural and literary historian (born 1944)

- Born: February 21, 1944 (age 82)
- Education: Tulane University (BA) (Ph.D.)
- Scientific career
- Fields: Jewish studies History of medicine
- Workplaces: Cornell University; University of Chicago; University of Illinois at Chicago; Warwick University; Emory University

Sander L. Gilman (born February 21, 1944), is an American cultural and literary historian. He is known for his contributions to Jewish studies and the history of medicine. He is the author or editor of over one hundred books.

Gilman's focus is on medicine and the echoes of its rhetoric in social and political discourse. In particular, Gilman investigates the constellations of medical, social, and political discourse that emerge at certain historical junctures.

== Academic career ==
Gilman obtained his B.A. degree in German language and literature from Tulane University in 1963, where he proceeded to gain his Ph.D. degree, also in German, in 1968. He was a professor at Cornell University (1976–1995), then moving to the University of Chicago for six years (1994–2000). He was then at the University of Illinois at Chicago for four years, founding its Program in Jewish Studies.

In 2005 he was appointed a distinguished professor of the Liberal Arts and Sciences at Emory University, where he was the Director of the Program in Psychoanalysis as well as of Emory University's Health Sciences Humanities Initiative. He also served as professor of psychiatry and was a member of the Psychoanalytic Institute at Emory. During 1990-1991 he served as the Visiting Historical Scholar at the National Library of Medicine, Bethesda, MD; 1996–1997 as a fellow of the Center for Advanced Study in the Behavioral Sciences, Stanford, CA; 2000–2001 as a Berlin prize fellow at the American Academy in Berlin; 2004–5 as the Weidenfeld Visiting professor of European Comparative Literature at Oxford University; 2007 to 2012 as Professor at the Institute in the Humanities, Birkbeck College; 2010 to 2013 as a Visiting research professor at The University of Hong Kong; and as the Alliance Professor of History at LMU Munich (2017–18). He has been a visiting professor at numerous universities in North America, South Africa, The United Kingdom, Germany, Israel, China, and New Zealand. In 2021, he was made professor emeritus at Emory.

He was president of the Modern Language Association in 1995. He has been awarded a Doctor of Laws (honoris causa) at the University of Toronto in 1997, elected an honorary professor of the Free University of Berlin (2000), made an honorary member of the American Psychoanalytic Association in 2008 and made a Fellow of the American Academy of Arts and Sciences (2016).

== Writing ==
Gilman wrote the basic study of the visual stereotyping of the mentally ill, Seeing the Insane, published by John Wiley and Sons in 1982 (reprinted: 1996 and 2013) as well as the standard study of Jewish Self-Hatred, the title of his Johns Hopkins University Press monograph of 1986, which is still in print. His Stand Up Straight! A History of Posture (Reaktion Press, London) and the edited volume Jews on the Move: Modern Cosmopolitanist Thought and Its Others were both published in 2018. I Know Who Caused COVID-19: Pandemics and Xenophobia (with Zhou Xun) appeared in 2021 (with Reaktion Press, London). Gilman also wrote two books on Franz Kafka. In response to the attacks on expertise and "science" during and following the pandemic, he published his Doc or Quack: Science and Anti-Science in Modern Medicine in 2025 with Reaktion Press in London.

=== Freud ===
He has examined Sigmund Freud, addressing the question of what role, if any, was played by Freud's Jewish origins in his composition of the psychoanalytic corpus. Gilman's thesis concerning this subject is that the prejudices of biology in the nineteenth century classified the Jew as being somehow feminine, a stigma that Freud sought to escape by carving out a scientific niche of his own. Licensed by his own brand of science, Freud could simultaneously lay claim to the manhood that the Viennese scientific establishment of the nineteenth century threatened to deny him, and also to the neutrality that was the warrant of its authority.

To make the case that contemporaneous antisemitism shaped Freud's thought, Gilman provides a catalogue of the most egregious antisemitic stereotypes of the time and place, including straightforward documentation of certain antisemitic prejudices, such as the belief in Jewish male menstruation, as well as period depictions of antisemitic stereotypes in graphic media.

== Editorial board membership ==
Gilman sits on the Honorary International Advisory Board of the Mens Sana Monographs.
