= Mauschel =

1897 article published by Theodor Herzl

Herzl's 1897 article "Mauschel"

Mauschel is a polemic article written and published by Theodor Herzl in 1897 under the name "Benjamin Seff", a transliteration of his Hebrew name. The text appeared in his newspaper, Die Welt, which was to become the principal outlet for the Zionist movement down to 1914, and was published roughly a month after the conclusion of the First Zionist Congress.

The essay contrasts Jews with the character "Mauschel", a stand-in for Jews that embrace anti-Zionism (Note: Kein wahrer Jude kann Antizionist sein, nur Mauschel ist es/"no true Jew can be an anti-Zionist; only Mauschel is one" (Herzl 1897, p. 2; Herzl 1973, pp. 166, 167; Penslar 2020b, p. 114).) and embody antisemitic tropes levied at Jews. The article has often been criticized for embracing antisemitic pejoratives and stereotypes and has been used as an example of Zionist antisemitism. Herzl later regretted publishing the essay. (Note: "[In Mauschel, Herzl] divided Jews into real Jews and a ‘lower’ Mauschel race. Mauschel is simply Herzl’s former negative view of Jews: dishonest, vain, trying to disappear into society, with no sense of honour and only interested in making money. The real Jews are those with a proud sense of Jewish identity and honour, such as Herzl has discovered. Herzl regretted publishing this piece in a fit of pique" (Beller 2012, p. 161).)

== Etymology and meaning ==
The word "Mauschel" is a pejorative epithet for Jews which is formed from the verb mauscheln, "to speak German with a Yiddish accent." One etymology derives it from the Yiddish Moyschele or "little Moses", though the sound also evokes connotations of Maus (mouse). The German writer and theologian Johann Peter Hebel translated it as "Mauses", evoking the verminous creature orthographically and phonetically. (Note: Maus (mouse) resonates with Mauschel. Jay Geller writes: "The term was applied to both the diseased, deficient and decadent language of the Jews, Yiddish, and the no-less diseased, deficient and decadent identity of the stereotypical Jews who speak that language. The orthographic connection between Maus and Mauschel is more than fortuitous since it is the absence of an indigenous language that denies nationality status to the Jews. Yiddish, Judendeutsch, Mauscheldeutsch, is for Nordau but a degenerate form of German. Maus points as well to Mieselsucht. The affix Miesel of Mieselsucht denotes the blotches symptomatic of leprosy, but it can also refer to a Mäuschen (literally 'little mouse')." (Geller 1995, p. 141)) Mauschel is attested from the 17th century as a word for a haggling Jewish trader, but the term's meaning was then extended to refer pejoratively to Judeo-Germans generally, regardless of the quality of their German. The connotative sense of both forms extends from hustling and swindling to insincerity and duplicitous or generally dishonourable behaviour. (Note: One immediate response by Moritz von Reymond to Wilhelm Marr's 1879 pamphlet which set a vogue for using the recent neologism antisemitic/antisemitism in the sense of opposition to both Jewry and Jewishness, uses the word in its very title, Wo steckt der Mauschel? Oder jüdischer Liberalismus und wissenschaftlicher Pessimismus. Ein offener brief an W. Marr. (Where is the kike? Or Jewish liberalism and scientific pessimism. An open letter to W. Marr).)

== Background ==
Theodore Herzl was a Jewish Austro-Hungarian and founder of modern political Zionism which aimed to found a Jewish state in Palestine. Herzl saw Zionism as a solution to the "Jewish question" in opposition to assimilation. In his early life Herzl favored assimilation as a solution to rising antisemitism in Europe. He himself lived as an assimilated, secular Jew in Vienna and Paris. Some scholars suggest that he also assimilated internalized antisemitic views of Jews which are present in his early writings. Herzl credited his shift to Zionism to a belief that antisemitism, even levied against assimilated Jews, could not be combatted. Herzl came to believe that only through a Jewish state could they avoid antisemitism and freely express their religion and culture. This culminated in the publication of his seminal essay "Der Judenstaat" (The Jewish State) in 1896.

Antisemitism at this time was common throughout Europe and was undergoing a shift from religious antisemitism to racial antisemitism based around concepts of ethnonationalism which viewed Jews as an alien race. Antisemitism commonly took the form of stereotyping and maligning of Jewish traits and culture as well as physical violence. In France, an infamous case was the wrongful conviction of a Jewish man, Alfred Dreyfus for treason in 1894. Even after evidence came to light that exonerated him in 1896, he was re-convicted in 1899 and the actual culprit, a gentile, was unanimously acquitted. The French legislative elections of 1898 were dominated by this Dreyfus affair and twenty-two professed antisemites were elected, six of whom were elected after campaigning under the "anti-juif" or "anti-Jew" label. Herzl credited the antisemitism of the Dreyfus affair and the mass rallies in as one of the key factors in his conversion to Zionism.

In August 1897, Herzl convened the First Zionist Congress in Basel, Switzerland that formed the Zionist Organization and set out the goals of the early Zionist movement. Herzl was elected the Zionist Organization’s first president and founded the weekly newspaper Die Welt (“The World”) to promote Zionism. The newspaper became the principal publication of the Zionist movement from 1987 to 1914.

Around this time Herzl was embracing his Jewish roots. He proudly proclaimed Die Welt as a "Judenblatt" (Jew-paper), and no longer hid his Jewish identity in his writing like he had in earlier publications. Some scholars suggest that at this time, internalized antisemitism in the language of his writing shifted to refer to a subclass of Jews who he claimed exemplified the stereotypes targeted at Jews in general. The essay Mauschel is used as an example of this where Jews are divided into Jews that exemplify traits admired by Herzl, and Jews represented by the character Mauschel, who exemplifies stereotypes and traits distasteful to Herzl.

== Synopsis ==
Mauschel is an essay in which Theodore Herzl criticizes a character 'Mauschel' who is a stand in for Jews that exemplify various qualities which Herzl finds distasteful. This is framed in comparison to other Jews who Herzl lauds. Mauschel is described as an anti-Zionist who doesn't care about honor or culture, and instead only cares about his own immediate advantage. He is variously called "a despicable schnorrer", "a miserable show-off", a "cunning profiteer" who conducts dirty business, and many other epithets. This is contrasted with 'the Jew' who is said to care about honor, art and intellectual pursuits.

Herzl claims that Mauschel is responsible for antisemitism targeted at Jews. He claims that other nations perceive Jews negatively as "a nation of swindlers and crooks because Mauschel rakes in profits and plays tricks on the stock market." Likewise he claims that Jews may have distanced themselves from Judaism to distance themselves from Mauschel. (Note: "[Jews are seen as] a nation of swindlers and crooks because Mauschel rakes in profits and plays tricks on the stock market. Mauschel has always provided the pretexts under which we were attacked. Mauschel is the curse of the Jew. Jew has always felt this instinctively, and it may have often happened that good Jews distanced themselves from the people and the faith of their fathers because they could no longer endure this community. Thus, Mauschel weakened Judaism both internally and externally." (Herzl 1897)) Herzl goes on to claim that due to the rise of racial antisemitism rather than religious antisemitism, even distancing themselves from religion does not prevent persecution via association with Mauschel. Herzl scoffs at the idea that Mauschel is the same race as other Jews even though he calls him a "fellow countryman". (Note: "The time came, our time, when even flight from religion could no longer free the Jew from solidarity with Mauschel. Race! As if Jew and Mauschel were of the same race."(Herzl 1897))

Herzl's foremost and most developed criticism of Mauschel is that he is an anti-Zionist. We are told that Mauschel is not simply 'not a Zionist' or an assimilationist, which Herzl finds defensible, but actively an 'anti-Zionist' who attacks Zionists calling them "Jewish anti-Semites". (Note: "Mauschel also hastily issued a treacherous slogan against the Zionists: they are Jewish anti-Semites. We? We, who, regardless of our acquired position and our advancement, profess ourselves to the world as Semites, uphold the cultivation of our ancient national identity, and stand by our poor brothers?"(Herzl 1897)) Herzl claims instead that Mauschel has "resigned himself to anti-Semitism" by "renouncing the Jews while simultaneously speaking in their name." Herzl claims that "No true Jew can be an anti-Zionist; only Mauschel is."

Herzl concludes his essay by saying that Jews should distance themselves from the shady and anti-Zionist Mauschel. He ends with a threat that Zionism will target Mauschel who is seen as an enemy. (Note: "Mauschel, beware! Zionism could do as Tell does in the legend. When Tell prepares to shoot the apple from his son's head, he has a second arrow ready. If the first shot misses, then the other will serve as revenge. Friends, the second arrow of Zionism is intended for Mauschel's chest!"(Herzl 1897))

== Responses and interpretations ==
Herzl's contemporary Karl Kraus, an assimilated Jew who was baptized as a Catholic, characterized Zionists as "Jewish antisemites" as he claimed they sought the expulsion of Jews from Europe much like "Aryan antisemites". In reference to Mauschel, Kraus claimed that Zionists were antisemitic for buying in to and attempting to disprove biases and tropes levied against Jews. Kraus himself has been widely criticized for using antisemitic language and railing against what he called "Jewish capitalism" and the "Jewish Press". He demanded that Jews should give up Judaism and seek "redemption through total assimilation".

Modern critics of the essay tend to oppose Herzl's use of antisemitic pejoratives and stereotypes. They often contend that Herzl makes concessions to antisemites by admitting their views have justification by separating Jews into 'good Jews' and a separate race or inhuman subspecies of 'bad Jews' exemplified by Mauschel. Some go as far as to call the character Mauschel an "antisemite's dream" or call the essay "the epitome of this ‘Zionist anti-Semitism’."

Some responses contextualize the anti-semitic characterization of Mauschel as part of a change perceived in Herzl's worldview. They claim that, as he embraced Zionism and Judaism, he attempted to separate himself and the "good Jews" from the Jews for which he still bore internalized antisemitism. Herzl is also compared in this to Theodor Lessing for similar perceived internalized antisemitism.

== See also ==
- Zionist antisemitism

== Sources ==
- Beller, Steven (2007). Antisemitism: A Very Short Introduction. Oxford University Press. ISBN 978-0192892775.
- Beller, Steven (2012). Herzl. Orion Publishing Group. ISBN 978-1-905-55953-4.
- Boyarin, Daniel (1997). Unheroic Conduct: The Rise of Heterosexuality and the Invention of the Jewish Man. University of California Press. ISBN 978-0-520-21050-9.
- Burri, Michael (1997). "Theodor Herzl and Richard von Schaukal: Self-Styled Nobility and the Sources of Bourgeois Belligerence in Prewar Vienna". Austrian History Yearbook. XXVIII: 223–246. doi:10.1017/S0067237800016398. S2CID 144833917.
- Geller, Jay (Spring 1995). "The Conventional Lies and Paradoxes of Jewish Assimilation: Max Nordau's Pre-Zionist Answer to the Jewish Question". Jewish Social Studies. 1 (3): 129–160. JSTOR 4467455.
- Geller, Jay (2017). Bestiarium Judaicum: Unnatural Histories of the Jews. Fordham University Press. ISBN 978-0-823-27560-1.
- Herzl, Theodor (15 October 1897). "Mauschel". Die Welt. No. 20. pp. 1–2.
- Herzl, Theodor (1920) [First published 1896]. Der Judenstaat (PDF) (in German). Jüdischer Verlag.
- Herzl, Theodor (1973). "Mauschel". In Zohn, Harry (ed.). Zionist Writings: Essays and Addresses. Vol. 1. Herzl Press. pp. 163–168.
- Kornberg, Jacques (1993). Theodor Herzl: From Assimilation to Zionism. Indiana University Press. ISBN 978-0-253-11259-0.
- Lacheny, Marc (2008). "Karl Kraus et Theodor Herzl". Cahiers d'Études Hongroises (in French). 14: 379–390 – via HAL.
- Levenson, Alan (2002). "Gentile Reception of Herzlian Zionism, a Reconsideration". Jewish History. 16 (2): 187–211. doi:10.1023/A:1015097330032. JSTOR 20101468. S2CID 159099945.
- Penslar, Derek J. (2020a). "Theodor Herzl, Race, and Empire". In Maciejko, Paweł; Ury, Scott (eds.). Making History Jewish: The Dialectics of Jewish History in Eastern Europe and the Middle East, Studies in Honor of Professor Israel Bartal. Brill. pp. 185–209. ISBN 978-9-004-43196-6.
- Penslar, Derek J. (2020b). Theodor Herzl: The Charismatic Leader. Yale University Press. ISBN 978-0-300-18250-7.
- Reitter, Paul (Autumn 2003). "Karl Kraus and the Jewish Self-Hatred Question". Jewish Social Studies. 10 (1): 78–116. doi:10.2979/JSS.2003.10.1.78. JSTOR 4467669. S2CID 161683261.
- von Reymond, Moritz (1879). Wo steckt der Mauschel? Oder jüdischer Liberalismus und wissenschaftlicher Pessimismus. Ein offener Brief an W. Marr (in German). Bern & Leipzig: Georg Frobeen & Cie.
- Timms, Edward (2005). Karl Kraus, Apocalyptic Satirist: The Post-War Crisis and the Rise of the Swastika. New Hawen: Yale University Press. ISBN 0-300-10751-X.
- Wistrich, Robert S. (Spring 1996). "Zionism and Its Religious Critics in fin-de-siècle Vienna". Jewish History. 10 (1): 93–111. doi:10.1007/BF01848255. JSTOR 20101253. S2CID 161514590.
