= Jewish male menstruation =

Belief that Jewish males menstruate

Jewish male menstruation is the antisemitic pejorative notion that Jewish males experience menstrual periods, or periodic bleeding. This belief was popular among Christians across Europe throughout the late medieval and early modern periods, including in Great Britain, Germany, and Spain. Common ways that Jewish men supposedly menstruated were through nosebleeds, urination, and hemorrhoids. The ability to menstruate was not associated with having a uterus. The first written mention of this purported phenomenon was in Jacques de Vitry’s Historia Orientalis in 1219. These attitudes have roots in both humorism and antisemitic Christian religious beliefs.

In the late 19th and early 20th century, contemporaries such as sexologist and physician Magnus Hirschfeld, physician Havelock Ellis, and neurologist and founder of psychoanalysis Sigmund Freud have expressed belief in the phenomenon of male menstruation, less specific than Jewish male menstruation, with Freud having claimed to experience male menstruation himself.

== Influences of Humorism ==
In the era of Hippocrates until around the 1850s, it was believed that health was based on equilibrium among the four ‘humours’: black bile, yellow bile, phlegm, and blood, under a system of medicine called Humorism. A common way to restore equilibrium if someone was ill was through bloodletting, to let an excess of blood, or ‘impure’ or ‘bad’ blood exit, thereby restoring equilibrium. There was also a common belief that women did this naturally, through menstruation. Men, meanwhile, needed to participate in bloodletting activities to remove the impure blood manually, if ill. If not ill, it was believed that men had a naturally higher body temperature, which rid the blood of impurities, while women were naturally cooler, and therefore had to menstruate to get rid of the impurities. However, it was believed that Jewish men were more like women, and had a lower body temperature, and therefore had to menstruate, typically through nosebleeds, bleeding hemorrhoids, or urination, in order to expel impure blood.

== Religious basis ==
Much of the basis for why Jewish men supposedly experienced menstruation was entrenched in religious beliefs, specifically Christian beliefs. Many Christians believed that Jewish people were responsible for Jesus Christ’s death, a belief known as Jewish deicide. There are many versions of how this relates to their supposed experience of menstruation. Under some tellings, Jewish people had been struck on their rear ends for killing Jesus Christ, and the resulting wounds, plus godly intervention, meant that Jewish men in following generations would experience menstruation through bleeding hemorrhoids as punishment for Jewish people supposedly having crucified Jesus Christ.

A very similar explanation for why Jewish men supposedly menstruated has to do with the idea that menstruation is a ‘curse.’ Women were cursed with menstruation because of the biblical story told in Genesis 3, where Eve had committed the original sin, by eating fruit God had forbidden her and Adam from eating in the Garden of Eden, and ever after, women were cursed with menstruation as punishment. Jewish men were allegedly also cursed for having crucified Jesus, and like women, were cursed with menstruation.

== As a basis for discrimination ==
=== Blood libel ===
Along with falsely believing that Jews menstruated, many medieval Christians also incorrectly believed in the blood libel canard, that Jewish people participated in ritualistic murder of Christians, in order to get their blood. There were many supposed uses for this Christian blood, including as an aphrodisiac, a pain killer, perfume, and also as a remedy for the various ‘deformities’ Christians believed Jews suffered from, such as horns, tails, a specific smell, and male menstruation. In a famous 1494 trial in Tyrnau (modern Austria), twelve Jewish men and two Jewish women were tried for the murder of a Christian child and having consumed its blood. Allegedly, as reported under interrogation, they committed the murder in order to drink the youth's blood as a remedy for both male and female menstruation.

=== Use in antisemitic propaganda ===
In recent centuries, the image of the menstruating Jewish male has been used in antisemitic propaganda, including in Nazi Germany. An example of this sort of antisemitic literature or propaganda is the work of Theodor Fritsch, a German journalist whose 19th century work The Handbook of the Jewish Question from 1893 was republished throughout the Nazi's rule in Germany. In this work, Fritsch argued for the antisemitic claim that male menstruation was a sign that Jewish people had a different sexuality from non-Jews.

== See also ==
- Alpha and beta male
- Antisemitic trope
- Effeminacy
  - Ergi and argr, Old Norse insults for alleged "unmanly" behaviour
  - Sissy
- Muscular Judaism
- History of antisemitism
- Sociology of gender
