= Muscular Judaism =

Philosophy of developing mental and physical strength among Jews

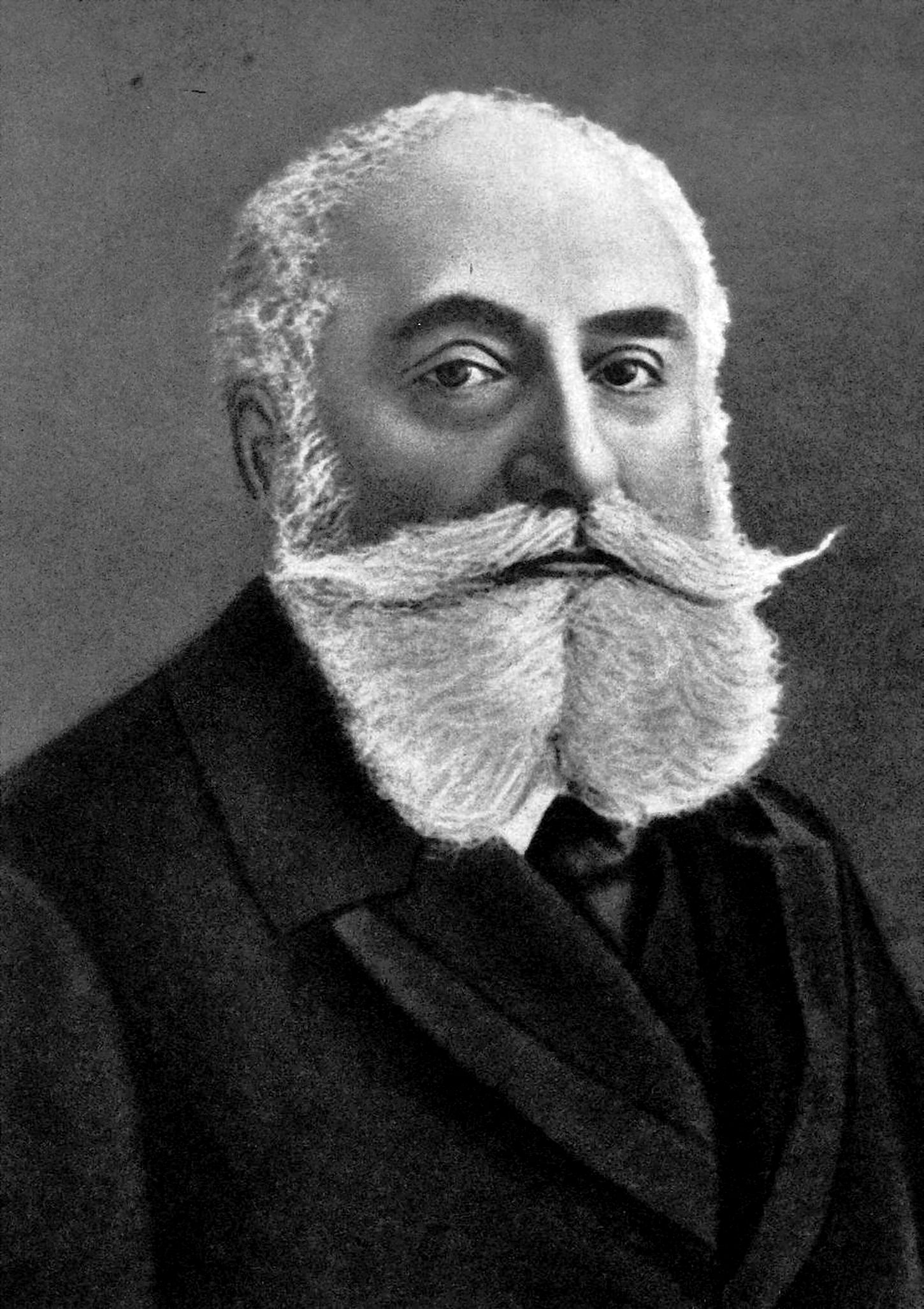
Max Nordau, who coined the term "Muscular Judaism"

Muscular Judaism (German: Muskeljudentum) is a term coined by Max Nordau in his speech at the Second Zionist Congress held in Basel on August 28, 1898. In his speech, he spoke about the need to design the "new Jew" and reject the "old Jew", with the mental and physical strength to achieve the goals of Zionism. Nordau saw Muscular Judaism as an answer to Judennot (the "Jewish distress" about facing rampant antisemitism).

== History ==
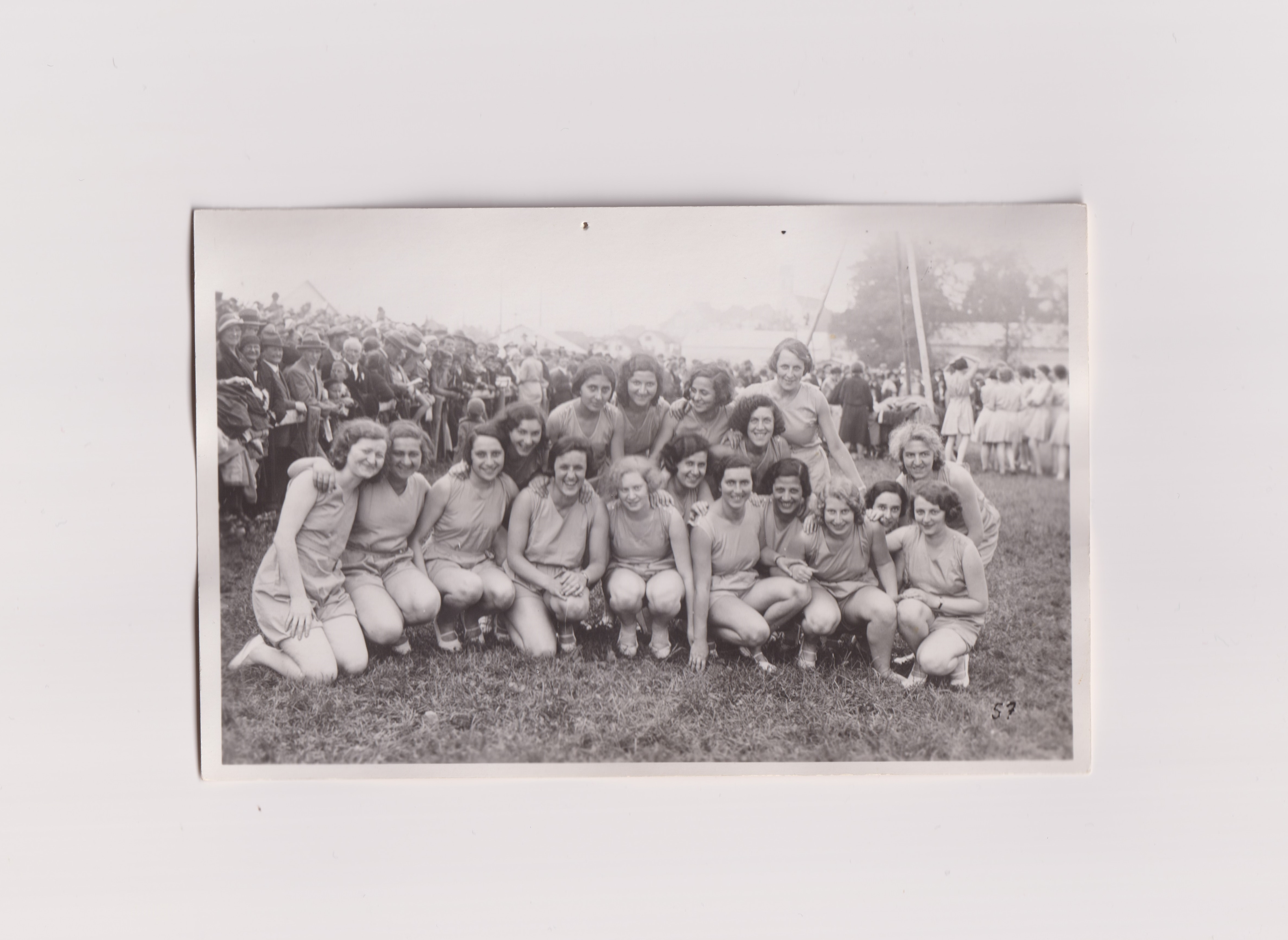
The women's gymnastics team of the Basel Jewish Sports Association. Photo from the Jewish Museum of Switzerland's collection.

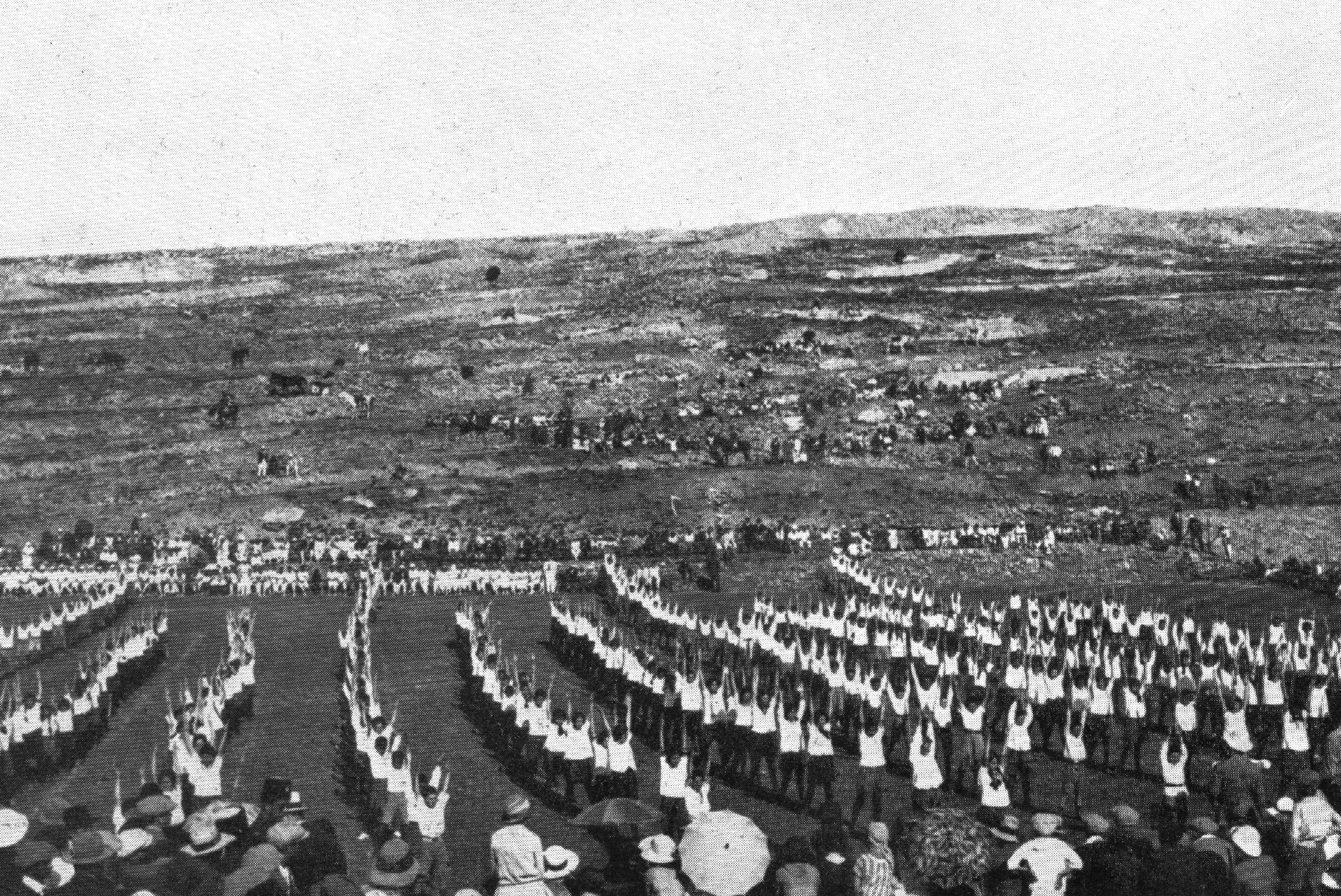
Gymnastics in Beit HaKerem, Jerusalem, 1925

The term refers to the cultivation of mental and physical properties, such as mental and physical strengths, agility and discipline, which all will be necessary for the national revival of the Jewish people. The characteristics of the muscular Jews are the exact opposite, an antithesis of the Diaspora Jew, especially in Eastern Europe, as shown in antisemitic literature and in the literature of the Haskalah. Nordau saw the promotion of muscular, athletic Jews as a counterpoint to such depictions of Jews as a weak people.

In addition, the "muscular" Jew is the opposite of the Halakhic and the Haskalah Jew—the man of letters, the intellectual—who was said to be busy all his life engaging with esoteric subjects. His body, and his will, grew weak.

Though Muscular Judaism was an idea practiced mostly by male Jews, Jewish women participated as well, especially in activities such as gymnastics.

At the time of Nordau's speech, the idea of Muscular Christianity was already widespread in various Christian countries.

== Jewish athletes in Europe ==
European Jewish leaders heeded Nordau's philosophy. Between 1896 and 1936, Jewish athletes won a disproportionate number of medals for Austria at the Olympics than their proportion of the total Austrian population.

Nordau's idea of Muscular Judaism also inspired the founders of Hakoah Vienna, a Viennese sports club especially well known for its football team. American journalist Franklin Foer has written that Hakoah (Hebrew for "the strength") was "one of the best teams on the planet" at its height in the mid-1920s. Hakoah players decorated their uniforms with Jewish symbols, such as the Star of David, and adopted nicknames of historical Jewish military leaders, such as Bar Kochba.

== See also ==
- Negation of the Diaspora
- Maccabi Hatzair
- Maccabi World Union
- Maccabiah Games
- Judenklub
- Nationalism and sport
- Nietzschean Zionism
- Muscular Christianity
- Muscular Islam
- Muscular liberalism
- Jutrzenka Kraków
