= Weaponization of antisemitism =

Politically motivated accusations of antisemitism

The weaponization of antisemitism is the use of accusations of antisemitism for political purposes, particularly to deflect or suppress criticism of Israel or of Zionism. Charges of antisemitism made in bad faith have been described as a smear tactic and likened to "playing the race card". Some Jews critical of Israel have been labeled "self-hating Jews".

There has been controversy over the concept of new antisemitism and the IHRA definition of antisemitism, both of which characterize some criticism of Israel as antisemitic. Some critics say that these concepts suppress legitimate discourse on Israel, while others say they describe antisemitic expressions which take the form of political commentary.

The charge of weaponization has itself been criticized as antisemitic or rooted in antisemitic tropes of Jewish dishonesty and control, and as a rhetorical device employed across the political spectrum to delegitimize Jewish concerns about antisemitism, especially in anti-Zionist discourse.

== History ==
In 1943, when a British court heard a case about Jews engaged in smuggling weapons into Palestine, future Israeli prime minister David Ben-Gurion called the case "a crude frame-up designed to defame the Jewish people" and called the speech of the defence counsel, who sought leniency for the defendants on the ground that they had been ensnared by a gun-running ring, "characteristic of the lowest type of anti-Semitism". Christopher Sykes wrote in 1965 that this incident began "a new phase in Zionist propaganda" in which "to be anti-Zionist was to be anti-Semitic". Propaganda theorist and activist Noam Chomsky has written that, although Sykes traced the origins of weaponized antisemitism to this episode, it was not until "the post-1967 period that the tactic has been honed to a high art, increasingly so, as the policies defended became less and less defensible".

=== Under Communism in the Eastern Bloc ===
In 1952, a "confession" was extracted under torture from Rudolf Slánský, Jewish former general secretary of the Communist Party of Czechoslovakia, of being a "Jewish capitalist" and "shield[ing] Zionism" by accusing its critics of antisemitism. Slánský's publicly broadcast statement said: "I deliberately shielded [Zionist conspirators] by abusing the campaign against so-called anti-Semitism, by proposing that a campaign be waged against anti-Semitism, by magnifying the danger of anti-Semitism ... I deliberately shielded Zionism by publicly speaking out against the people who pointed to the hostile activities of Zionists and by describing these people as anti-Semites." David Hirsh describes this as a deployment of the Livingstone Formulation (defending against charges of antisemitism with a counter-accusation of deception or bad faith) characteristic of Soviet antisemitism. The British Communist Party denied that the Slánský trial was antisemitic, and rejected the charge of Soviet antisemitism altogether as "emanating from unreliable, capitalist, and pro-imperialist sources".

According to Isi Leibler, starting in the late 1950s the Soviet Union produced literature for Western consumption on the supposed nonexistence of a Jewish question in the Soviet Union, accusing those who alleged mistreatment of Soviet Jews of being "cold warriors" who sought to slander the USSR. Between 1958 and 1964, western Communists reproduced and distributed these publications uncritically, and generally responded to examples of antisemitic Soviet productions by defending them aesthetically or denouncing them as propagandistic fabrications. In 1964, Bertrand Russell published an open letter protesting the notion, which he said was promulgated by Soviet authorities and Western defenders of communism, that the charge of Soviet antisemitism was an expression of a "cold war attitude" made to distract from Western racism. In 1962, American Marxist historian and activist Herbert Aptheker published a pamphlet titled The Fraud of "Soviet Anti-Semitism". The Communist Party of Australia opposed Leibler's campaigning for Soviet Jews, and republished the pamphlet domestically with a foreword decrying the raising of the issue of Soviet antisemitism at the United Nations by Australia as a "right-wing Cold War plot intended to divide the labour movement".

In 1963, Soviet leader Nikita Khrushchev said at an address to Soviet intellectuals:

The bourgeois press is conducting a campaign of slander against us ... [Yevgeny Yevtushenko's poem about the massacre of Jews at Babi Yar] presents things as if only Jews were the victims ... For whom and for what purpose has it been necessary to present things as if someone is discriminating against the Jews in our country? ... There is no Jewish question in our country, and those who invent it are slavishly repeating what other people say.

In 1967, the Communist Party USA (CPUSA) withdrew a draft resolution by the party's Jewish commission calling for Soviet authorities to restore "the administratively suppressed Jewish cultural institutions", including Jewish theaters and Yiddish-language newspapers. Though it rejected claims of antisemitism in the Soviet Union as "a slander and an outright fraud", the draft acknowledged Soviet authorities' "shortcomings", including suppression of Jewish prayer books. Explaining the draft's withdrawal, a CPUSA leader wrote that it had to be edited so that it "unequivocally reject[s] any idea of 'Soviet anti-Semitism' in whatever guise it may appear, and any campaign of public criticism". Another party leader said he had visited Soviet Jews and found no antisemitism, but only Jews angry about the "campaign of falsehoods" against the USSR.

Sociologist Anna Zawadzka has argued that the Livingstone Formulation was already in use in Poland in 1968, such that Jews "could not articulate their experiences of antisemitism" without having their testimony "diagnosed as either cynical victim-playing or an emotional disorder." She interpreted this response as a form of "paternalistic violence", viewing the traumatized Polish Jews as deserving of sympathy, but not of trust in their view of antisemitism in the decades since the Holocaust. Zawadzka wrote that this paternalistic view has changed, with Jews now being seen as cynical and manipulative rather than as traumatized and paranoid in their articulations of antisemitism. According to Polish historian Alina Cata, "There was [by 1968] a widespread charge that Zionists incited the West to make groundless accusations of antisemitism against Poles."

In 1970, Ron I. Rubin wrote, "Nations raising charges of Soviet antisemitism [at the United Nations] are accused of attempting to subvert the Soviet Union by destroying its multinational character through the introduction of the poison of nationalism", and that Soviet denials of antisemitism are generally irrelevant to the accusation and contradicted by "certain official admissions".

In the 1980s, the Anti-Zionist Committee of the Soviet Public (AKSO) was formed, led by David Dragunsky. It issued articles and propaganda denouncing "international Zionism" and rebutting the claim of a "Jewish question" in the USSR as a lie spread by Zionists: "those Zionist wheeler-dealers try to persuade the world's public opinion that, allegedly, in the USSR there exists the 'Jewish question.' … It is with contempt that Soviet Jews cast aside the attempts by Zionist propagandists to interfere in their life." The U.S. State Department decried the AKSO's publications as antisemitic propaganda meant to shield the Soviet Union from scrutiny of the plight of Soviet Jews. The Committee's founding article in Pravda shortly followed the 1983 World Conference on Soviet Jewry in Jerusalem, where the Soviet Union's treatment of Jews had been harshly criticized.

Aleksander Smolar wrote in 1987 that Communist Polish authorities wielded "real and imagined" charges of antisemitism against their opposition, particularly in the Catholic Church. He added that the Communists' image as the defenders of Jews might have inhibited the Church's willingness to defend Jews from pogroms, as Church authorities would not want to be interpreted as giving support to the Communists.

Jovan Byford writes that the Serbian Orthodox Church responded to accusations of antisemitism in the 1980s and 1990s by denying antisemitism:

literal denial is routinely accompanied by the questioning of the morality of the critics and the veracity of their claims. The topic of debate is regularly re-directed towards the accusers, whose position is constructed, in very elaborate ways, as mistaken, intolerant, biased, and malicious.

András Kovács has written that antisemitic discourse after the replacement of the Communist Hungarian People's Republic held that, during the Communist era, powerful Jews used "the charge of antisemitism [to] de-legitimize [...] the anticommunist national forces and places them in a disadvantageous position both in politics and in public life", and that Communist Jews then allied with liberal Jews to retain political power after the establishment of the Republic of Hungary.

=== Post-1967 Arab–Israeli War and new antisemitism ===
After the 1967 Arab–Israeli War, the Anti-Defamation League (ADL)—with AIPAC founder Isaiah L. Kenen's support, according to Israeli historian Ilan Pappé—sought to "portray certain 'anti-Israel' actions as anti-Semitic", especially with regard to international calls for Israel to end its occupation of the West Bank. In 1974, ADL leaders Arnold Forster and Benjamin Epstein published The New Anti-Semitism, which identified anti-Zionism as a "new antisemitism", an idea the ADL has sought to popularize since the early 1970s.

In 1973, after the Yom Kippur War, Israeli foreign minister Abba Eban wrote: "One of the chief tasks of any dialogue with the Gentile world is to prove that the distinction between anti-Semitism and anti-Zionism is not a distinction at all. Anti-Zionism is merely the new anti-Semitism." Of Eban's statement, Chomsky later said: "That is a convenient stand. It cuts off a mere 100 percent of critical comment!"

In 1980, Edward Said said that, since its inception, Zionist discourse had aimed "to lay claim to Palestine both as a backward, largely uninhabited territory" and as a place where Jews had "a unique historical privilege" to rebuild a homeland. As a result, he said, this meant anyone who opposed Zionism "immediately aligned oneself with anti-Semitism". Said said this routine conflation of anti-Zionism with antisemitism functioned to suppress criticism of Israel and was reinforced by simplistic media narratives, the influence of pro-Israel pressure groups, and academics' and intellectuals' uncritical repetition of political clichés.

=== During the Gaza war ===
After examining appearances of the word "antisemitism" before and after October 7, 2023, Neve Gordon wrote in The Jewish Chronicle:

The data reveals that TJC has been exaggerating and instrumentalising a Zionist notion of antisemitism to foment moral panic, mobilising the language of trauma and injury to continuously reassert a notion of Jewish victimhood [... in support of] a justificatory framework that operates by claiming injury and then using the alleged injury to set in motion a series of oppressive actions against individuals, groups and institutions.

Gordon has also written that the scores of civil society organizations, primarily in Israel, North America, and Europe, that are invested in shielding Israel from criticism by smearing Palestine advocacy with accusations of antisemitism represent "by far the largest group of apartheid enablers".

According to legal scholar Shirin Sinnar, university administrators' repression of campus protests in the 2023–24 academic year weakened academic liberty in the face of authoritarianism under the Trump administration: the "failure to rebut politicized narratives that pro-Palestine protests were rampant with violence, antisemitism, and lawlessness has made it harder for academic institutions to resist the even greater weaponization of such caricatures now."

== Examples of allegations ==
In 1990, the Argentine newspaper Buenos Aires Herald defended President of Argentina Carlos Menem against charges of antisemitism, writing that the allegations "may have been prompted by President Menem's good relations with Jews which constitutes 'a perceived threat to the [opposing] Radical Party's traditional Jewish constituency'".

In 2017, Israeli-born British musician and writer Gilad Atzmon accused Campaign Against Antisemitism chair Gideon Falter of exaggerating and fabricating antisemitism as a "business plan" to "collect more and more British taxpayer money": "Falter and the CAA obviously fabricate anti-Semitic incidents. Falter interprets condemnation of Israel and Jewish politics as 'hate crime'". In 2018 he was forced by the High Court to apologise to Falter and the CAA for his allegations, which the Court found to be false, including the suggestion that the CAA was "too ready to characterise as anti-Semitism legitimate criticism of Israel". Atzmon has denied being antisemitic, saying he is the victim of "an international smear campaign, orchestrated and promoted by various Zionist institutions that attempt to silence every form of legitimate dissent of Zionism and Israeli politics." In 2012, when a coalition of pro-Palestinian activists published a letter describing him as an antisemite and calling on members of the Palestinian movement to denounce him, Atzmon attributed the letter to a "relentless slander campaign" from "would-be silencers".

In a 2010 letter to Anti-Defamation League (ADL) director Abraham Foxman, Nation of Islam leader Louis Farrakhan accused Jewish leaders of using the charge of antisemitism to suppress criticism "of what I and many others feel is Jewish behavior that has ill-affected Black people and others." Farrakhan had voiced similar sentiments in a 1994 article in The Final Call, the Nation of Islam's newspaper, writing: "The ADL ... uses the term 'anti-Semitism' to stifle all criticism of Zionism and the Zionist policies of the State of Israel and also to stifle all legitimate criticism of the errant behavior of some Jewish people toward the non-Jewish population." In a 2020 speech, Farrakhan attributed characterizations of him as an antisemite to dishonest actors seeking to censor him: "They tell lies to make you think I am a bigot or antisemite, so that you won't listen to what I'm saying. So far they've been pretty successful." In the same speech, Farrakhan criticized Jews for having supposedly "supplanted the Torah with the Talmud". In 2023, Farrakhan filed a $4.8 billion lawsuit against the ADL and the Simon Wiesenthal Center for allegedly defaming him as an antisemite, a "false charge" he said had "been spread throughout the Earth" thanks to the ADL's "influence over the media". Farrakhan's suit argued that the real reason he had been labeled an antisemite was to suppress his "viewpoint" that "black people are the real children of Israel" and his "pointing out misbehavior of some members of the Jewish community". The complaint was dismissed in court in 2024. Farrakhan's later bid to revive the lawsuit was denied in 2025.

After American author Alice Walker was accused of antisemitism for recommending a book by Holocaust denier David Icke and for her 2017 poem "It Is Our (Frightful) Duty To Study The Talmud", Walker wrote in response that the "attempt to smear David Icke, and by association, me, is really an effort to dampen the effect of our speaking out in support of the people of Palestine." Palestinian American writer and activist Susan Abulhawa wrote that Walker's "real offence [in the eyes of her critics] is her defiant support for Palestinian liberation" and called the backlash against her the "clawing [of] Zionist machines".

In a 2018 interview, Prime Minister of Malaysia Mahathir Mohamad said "'Anti-Semitic' is a term that is invented to prevent people from criticizing the Jews for doing wrong things."

After Robert F. Kennedy Jr. was criticized for saying that "COVID-19 is targeted to attack Caucasians and Black people [and] the people who are most immune are Ashkenazi Jews and Chinese", Kennedy said that the allegations against him of antisemitism were hurtful, that his words had been "distorted and weaponized", and that he had "literally never said an antisemitic word in my life". When questioned by a House Select Committee, Kennedy said those who called his remarks antisemitic and racist were attempting to censor him "through smears, misinterpretations of what I said, through lies."

== Areas of controversy ==
The charge of weaponization has been raised across the political spectrum, especially in anti-Zionist discourse on the left and right. Scholars John Mearsheimer and Stephen Walt in the 2000s and Matthew Abraham in the 2010s suggested that the charge of antisemitism was becoming less effective when applied to criticisms of Israel.

While warning in 2010 against denying or minimizing antisemitism, attorney and academic Kenneth L. Marcus also cautioned against overuse of the "anti-Semitism card", paralleling concerns raised by Richard Thompson Ford with the broader misuse of "the race card": that it can be dishonest and mean-spirited, risks weakening legitimate accusations of bigotry, risks distracting socially concerned organizations from other social injustices, and hurts outreach efforts between Jewish and Arab or Muslim groups.

=== Israel and Zionism ===
Some activists and scholars have said that weaponization of antisemitism, and new antisemitism in particular, has been used to stifle criticism of Israel.

In the early 1950s, U.S. journalist Dorothy Thompson, a former advocate of Zionism, was publicly called antisemitic when she began to criticize Zionism after a visit to Palestine in 1945. (Note: Karine Walther, Dorothy Thompson and American Zionism, Diplomatic History, Volume 46, Issue 2, April 2022, Pages 263–291, https://doi.org/10.1093/dh/dhab107. Quotation: "Militant Zionists' campaigns against the British led Thompson to critique this violence, although she remained supportive of the broader Zionist project. Despite the limited nature of her criticism, she ... began receiving hate mail ... accusing her of antisemitism" & "American Zionists publicly accused [Thompson] and the AFME of antisemitism and of being bribed by Arab oil interests.... Thompson believed she had enough evidence to sue the newspapers publishing these accusations for libel ... she did successfully level this threat against Rabbi Baruch Korff, who published a letter in the New Hampshire Manchester Union Leader in 1953 accusing Thompson of being ... a "seasoned anti-Semite," a "Goebels-minded [sic] publicity agent," and a "mercenary ill-motivated agent for the heirs of Naziism." This was not the first time Korff had weaponized accusations of antisemitism." & "American Zionists responded by launching personal and public attacks against Thompson and the organizations she worked for in an attempt to silence their critiques. This included ... leveling accusations that Thompson and other Protestant critics were antisemitic.") (Note: H-Diplo Article Review of Karine Walther, 'Dorothy Thompson and American Zionism,' Diplomatic History 46:2 (April 2022) 263–291, by Amy Fallas, University of California, Santa Barbara. Quotations: "Following the creation of the state of Israel in 1948, Thompson became a more outspoken critic of Zionism but was shocked at the unabated character attacks and accusations of anti-Semitism that threatened to upend her career in journalism.") (Note: Fighting Words: The Bold American Journalists Who Brought the World Home between the Wars. By Nancy F Cott. (2020). Quotation: "Before and during the war, American Zionists had prized Thompson for denouncing anti-Semitism and advocating unrestricted Jewish migration to Palestine. To these supporters' shock, her opinions shifted after she traveled to Palestine in 1945. As she learned more about the conflicts between Zionists and resident Arab Palestinians, Thompson became sympathetic to the Arab position. ... She supported Arab claims in 1946 and 1947, gaining enemies who vilified her as an anti-Semite—even as pro-Nazi. She was neither.") (Note: Sanders, Marion K (1973), Dorothy Thompson: A Legend in Her Time. Quotation: "For Dorothy, the bitterest blow was the discovery that Zionists equated criticism of their policies with anti-Semitism.") Thompson felt the accusations, which persisted throughout her career, amounted to a "type of blackmail" or character assassination. Professor Lyndsey Stonebridge wrote, "today, many see the silencing of a bold humanitarian advocate in her story, and it is not difficult to understand why", but added, "there can be no doubt that anti-Semitism was a theme in Thompson's later writing", particularly in the form of pathologizing Jewishness.

In his 1956 memoir, British military officer John Bagot Glubb denied accusations of antisemitism for his criticism of Israel, writing: "It does not seem to me to be either just or expedient that similar criticisms directed against the Israeli government should brand the speaker with the moral stigma generally associated with anti-Semitism." Israeli historian Benny Morris linked such allegations against Glubb to a "tendency among Israelis and Jews abroad to identify strong criticism of Israel as tantamount to, or as at least stemming from, anti-Semitism", although Morris also said Glubb's anti-Zionism was "tinged by a degree of anti-Semitism" and his "outlook on the history of the Jews ... is jaundiced, inaccurate, and, at times, blatantly anti-Semitic".

In 1989, Cheryl Rubenberg wrote that it was "a common practice among Israel's advocates" to call opponents of "the [Israel] lobby's positions" or supporters of a Palestinian homeland antisemitic, referring to incidents involving U.S. politicians Charles Mathias, Pete McCloskey, and Jesse Jackson. In a 1992 book, the American diplomat emeritus George Ball wrote that AIPAC and other pro-Israel groups "employ the charge of 'anti-Semitism' so carelessly as to trivialize it" and that this was due to a lack of any "rational argument" with which to defend the state's actions.

Critics such as the Israel–Palestine researcher Suraya Dadoo, journalist Ben White, and Associate Professor of English at the University of Arizona Matthew Abraham have suggested that international Israeli advocacy groups have charged prominent people who express pro-Palestinian sentiment, such as Jimmy Carter and Desmond Tutu, with antisemitism. Abraham says this is a form of "political correctness" that undermines "greater understanding about the conditions producing conflict in the Israel–Palestine conflict". In 2002, Tutu said, "to criticise [Israel] is to be immediately dubbed anti-Semitic, as if the Palestinians were not Semitic ... People are scared in this country [the US] to say wrong is wrong because the Jewish lobby is powerful—very powerful." South African Muslim scholar Farid Esack wrote that it was unfortunate that Tutu's statement "verged into antisemitic tropes" but "this misspoken moment unfolded because of his prophetic support of Palestinians". Tutu also attributed the charge of antisemitism to an "arrogance of power, because Jews are a powerful lobby in this land".

In the 21st century, various writers have suggested that charges of antisemitism in discussions of Israel can have a chilling effect, deterring criticism of Israel due to fear of being associated with beliefs linked to antisemitic crimes against humanity such as the Holocaust. In 2004, Joel Beinin wrote that the Anti-Defamation League (ADL) and other organizations used the "well-established ploy" of conflating criticism of Israel with antisemitism, exposing Jews to attack by suggesting they are responsible for the Israeli government's actions.

In a 2005 interview with Campus Watch, Norman Finkelstein said, "Whenever Israel faces a public relations debacle such as the Intifada or international pressure to resolve the Israel-Palestine conflict, American Jewish organizations orchestrate this extravaganza called the 'new anti-Semitism.'" In 2008, Finkelstein said that organizations such as the ADL had advanced charges of new antisemitism since the 1970s "to exploit the historical suffering of Jews in order to immunize Israel against criticism". Finkelstein has said that use of "the anti-Semitism card" attempts to displace "fundamental responsibility for causing the conflict from Israel to the Arabs, the issue no longer being Jewish dispossession of Palestinians but Arab 'opposition' to Jews". He compared claims of antisemitism against critics of Israel to Soviet censorship. In 2008, he wrote that some of what "the Israel lobby" suggests is antisemitism is in fact "exaggeration and fabrication", "mislabeling legitimate criticism of Israeli policy", and "the unjustified yet predictable 'spillover' from criticism of Israel to Jews generally". Jonathan Judaken said Finkelstein's dismissal of new antisemitism was "the mirror-image of the alarmists he seeks to denounce".

In The Israel Lobby and U.S. Foreign Policy (2008), John Mearsheimer and Stephen Walt wrote that Israel's supporters have sought to shield it from criticism and pressure using fears of a "new antisemitism", naming as examples ADL publications raising concerns of antisemitism at moments of particular political pressure against Israel. They wrote that the charge of antisemitism can discourage others from defending in public those against whom the charge has been made. They said that rhetorical accusations of antisemitism put a burden of proof on the accused person, putting them in the "difficult" position of having to prove a negative. They wrote, "we should all be disturbed by the presence of genuine anti-Semitism", but suggested that "playing the anti-Semitism card stifles discussion" and "allows myths about Israel to survive unchallenged". In 2010, Kenneth L. Marcus wrote that although Mearsheimer and Walt called such accusations "the Great Silencer", they had not themselves been silenced, having received a wide audience for their book and appearances. Marcus also wrote that many pro-Israel commentators had also taken pains to say that not all criticism of Israel is antisemitic. Ross Douthat wrote that the Mearsheimer and Walt are more the beneficiaries of "a calculated decision to take a highly-polemical approach to a hot-button topic" than they are victims of a supposed "suffocating and dangerous atmosphere of lockstep philo-Zionism in the American intelligentsia". Debates about the "antisemitism card", Douthat wrote, take place in a political environment where explicit political antisemitism is a "live and potent political force", whereas "race card" debates take place in a context where racism has been banished from open expression and exists only in "the realm of symbolism and subliminal messaging".

In 2009, Tamar Meisels wrote:

[It is] very convenient for Jews, Israelis and Americans… to counter political attacks with the victim's cry of anti-Semitism. After all, in the post-Nazi era, no one wants to appear anti-Semitic. After the gas chambers, it is hardly bon ton to be an anti-Semite. So such accusations should be enough to shut anyone up.

But Meisels notes that many criticisms of Israel are antisemitic, giving the example of antisemitic tropes in statements by two western writers, Breyten Breytenbach and Jose Saramago. Meisels wrote that though she suspected "that some fierce anti-Zionism is tainted with old-fashioned anti-Semitism ... being an anti-Semite does not actually disqualify someone from also making rational criticisms of Israel and the US ... even a stopped clock is right twice a day." Responding to her article, Brian Klug agreed that unwarranted accusations "devalue the word ['antisemitism'], cheapen the charge and alienate people of goodwill", but said that antisemitic criticisms of Israel exist and should be called out as such. The next year, Klug wrote:

Critics of Israel, crossing an invisible line in the sand, find themselves accused of anti-Jewish hatred (or self-hatred if Jewish). They react by accusing their accusers, alleging that so-called antisemitism is nothing more than a machination of "the Israel lobby". At once, this is seized upon as an antisemitic slur; which in turn is denounced as a Zionist smear. Round and round they go, down and down they go, in a circle that gets ever more vicious. One of the depressing things about this vicious circle is that so many virtuous people—people of goodwill—get caught up in it.

In 2019, Joshua Leifer, an editor of Dissent magazine, wrote that campaigns that consider anti-Zionism antisemitic aim to shift criticisms of the Israeli government "beyond the pale of mainstream acceptability". In December 2023, antisemitism expert David Feldman said that, while "some anti-Zionism takes an antisemitic form", the context must be considered when differentiating antisemitism from legitimate discourse and that there is "a long history of Israel and its supporters portraying anti-Zionism and other criticisms of Israel as antisemitic" to delegitimize them.

In the 2020s, some authors have accused the ADL of advancing false claims of antisemitism against critics of Israel.

In 2024, during the Gaza war, Raz Segal wrote that conflating the state of Israel with Jews is part of the weaponization of antisemitism discourse that protects Israel from criticism, especially in discussion of Israeli settler colonialism. Political scientist Omar Shahabudin McDoom wrote in 2024 that the identification of "critic[ism] of the conduct of the Israeli government" with antisemitism is not necessarily in bad faith but may be attributed to conscious or unconscious "prosemitic" bias: "Although it has long been argued the antisemite label has been used instrumentally to silence critics of Israel, it may not always be disingenuous behaviour." In 2024, Marshall Ganz accused "groups like the Brandeis Center" of weaponizing antisemitism, comparing their tactics to McCarthyism, when they labeled critics of Israeli policies as antisemites. In a 2026 editorial in Critical Research on Religion, Warren S. Goldstein of the Center for Critical Research on Religion wrote:

The conflation of being critical of Israel and being antisemitic is an attempt to deflect criticism of the policies of the state of Israel and instead displaces blame on to all Jews [...] it is the poor unhumanitarian behavior of Israel which is the prime driver of antisemitism.

In 2024, Irish president Michael D. Higgins dismissed claims by the Israeli ambassador about antisemitism in Ireland as a "PR exercise", saying "It is absolutely outrageous to be abusing the Jewish community by saying that there is widespread antisemitism" and calling it "deep slander" to suggest that Irish people are antisemitic. Members of Ireland's Jewish community criticized Higgins for these comments. The choice of Higgins to deliver a speech at the next year's Holocaust memorial day generated controversy among Irish Jewish groups, who said he had denied Irish antisemitism and dismissed Jewish concerns.

In April 2025, American children's educator Ms. Rachel, who has advocated for children experiencing trauma and starvation in Gaza, featured in an "Antisemite of the Week" column by the pro-Israel advocacy group StopAntisemitism, which accused her of spreading Hamas propaganda. (Note: Sassoon, D. (2025), Gaza: livestreaming genocide. The Political Quarterly. https://doi.org/10.1111/1467-923x.70004 – Quotation: "'Ms Rachel' (Rachel Accurso), an American children's entertainer with over 15 million YouTube subscribers, became increasingly outspoken about the plight of children in Gaza. In May 2025, she shared a post and videos of her meeting with Rahaf, a three-year-old girl who lost both her legs when her home was struck by Israeli bombs. Unsurprisingly, Jewish organisations such as StopAntisemitism accused Ms Rachel of spreading 'Hamas propaganda'. This is what you get for showing compassion toward Palestinians.") In November 2025, the group named her a finalist for its "Antisemite of the Year". Jews for Racial and Economic Justice defended Ms. Rachel, saying that StopAntisemitism "solely exists to punish and harass private and public individuals who criticize the actions of the State of Israel or simply express sympathy for and solidarity with Palestinians."

==== Accusations of "self-hatred" ====
Some Jewish critics of Israel have been accused of antisemitism and called "self-hating Jews".

In 1989, Noam Chomsky sarcastically said that "it is now necessary to identify criticism of Israeli policies as anti-Semitism—or in the case of Jews, as 'self-hatred,' so that all possible cases are covered".

Scholars have described the label as a means of delegitimizing Jewish critics of Israel by attributing their views to pathology, disloyalty, or prejudice rather than engaging with their arguments.

The now defunct website Masada2000 hosted a list of so-called "Self-Hating and/or Israel-Threatening" Jews, known as the "S.H.I.T. List", naming nearly 9,000 Jewish public figures as "socialists, communists, anarchists and so-called 'human rights' junkies and 'peace and justice' activists". Philosopher Marilyn Friedman cites the S.H.I.T. list as an example of "Jewish supporters of Israeli policies try[ing] to discredit the arguments of Jewish critics of Israeli policies by accusing the critics of being 'self-hating Jews'", and as a manifestation of "excessive and unreasonable" expectations of group loyalty.

Zaher and Mintchev write that members of British Jewish organization Na'amod were accused of self-hatred in order to discredit them.

Mann and Yona write that anti-Zionist Jews have been framed as "self-hating Jews" engaged in antisemitic behavior, with Jewish identities that do not conform to Israeli interests delegitimized.

Cheyette writes that Israeli anti-war protesters have been demonized as "fascists" or "self-hating Jews" by the Israeli government. Zahi Anbra Zalloua writes that discussion of Zionism can prompt claims that anti-Zionist Jews are "either confused or self-hating". Paul Reitter traces the rhetoric of Jewish self-hatred in relation to Zionism, while Dy-Liacco examines its "deeply Jewish roots". Marthie Momberg writes that transnational activists campaigning against Israel's treatment of Palestinians are often called "liars," "terror-loving, Hamas-supporting, anti-Semites," "traitors," "outcasts," and "self-hating Jews".

In 2014, Matthew Abraham wrote:

To draw this equation between anti-Semitism and anti-Zionism, Israel's supporters have sought to make the argumentative leap that criticism of Israel as the Jewish state is anti-Semitic precisely because Israel is the home of all Jews for all time. However, this argument does not work since there are many anti-Zionist Jews who reject Israel's attempts to speak in the name of Judaism. The traditional response to this problem has been to label anti-Zionist Jews as "self-hating Jews," which requires a suspension of rationality and sound judgement.

==== Pro-Palestinian activism ====
Multiple scholars have said that allegations of antisemitism have been weaponized against pro-Palestinian protesters.

In 2018, over 40 Jewish organizations on the political left, including Jewish Voice for Peace, published an open letter saying that pro-Palestinian organizations were the subject of "cynical and false accusations of antisemitism" in order to discredit them.

During the Gaza war, scholar Raz Segal, former Hillel executive director for Harvard University Bernie Steinberg, and former Israeli negotiator Daniel Levy said that antisemitism had been weaponized to silence pro-Palestinian voices, especially in regard to Israel's human rights abuses. French sociologist Eva Illouz wrote about "weaponization of antisemitism both by the Trump administration and the Israeli government, in order to silence criticism and to police, punish and control universities". According to Mitchel Plitnick and Sahar Aziz, a presumption that all Muslims are antisemitic has been "increasingly deployed by Zionist groups to eliminate critical debate inclusive of Palestinian experiences". In 2024, a group of Germanophone scholars said the weaponization of antisemitism against pro-Palestinian protesters, people of color, and post- and decolonial scholars by universities and the Austrian political right meant the "recent increase of antisemitic crimes and the structural antisemitism across Austrian society are thereby obscured".

The American doxing website Canary Mission has been criticized by The Intercept's Alex Kane for conflating criticism of Israel with antisemitism in order to suppress support for Palestine in the United States. Warren S. Goldstein names Canary Mission as a component of "The attack on the universities, in the name of combatting antisemitism (and also Diversity, Equity, and Inclusion DEI) [which] is really an attack against the Left."

===== University campuses in the United States =====
During the 2023–25 Gaza war, there were many protests at universities. Israel and its supporters called the protests at U.S. universities antisemitic, and Israel's critics say such allegations are used to silence opposition. There were antisemitic remarks and violent threats during the protests, but the protest organizers, some Jewish, described the movement as peaceful defense of Palestinian rights. In the U.S., Democrats and Republicans have characterized campus protests in solidarity with the Palestinians in Gaza as "rampant antisemitism", a characterization Israeli Holocaust historian Raz Segal has called "woefully misguided—and dangerous". Segal, former Hillel Harvard director Bernie Steinberg, and Jewish Currents editor-in-chief Arielle Angel said that criticisms of the protests included weaponized antisemitism. Of the 2024 pro-Palestinian protests on university campuses, Segal wrote, "the blanket assertion [of "rampant antisemitism" at the protests] by pro-Israel advocates is intended as a political cudgel: weaponizing antisemitism to shield Israel from criticism of its attack on Gaza". Angel said the American right has weaponized claims of antisemitism against pro-Palestinian campus activism to ban boycotts of Israel and curtail the right to protest, and that Republicans and the Anti-Defamation League have attempted to portray pro-Palestinian student protesters as "terrorists". Steinberg wrote that "fabricated and weaponized" charges against campus protesters must be "put aside" to deal with the "real and dangerous" antisemitism posed by "alt-right white-supremacist politics".

Some Jewish and Palestinian faculty and students at Columbia University and Barnard College called the response of politicians and the universities' administrations to campus protests "weaponization of antisemitism". Harvard University appointed antisemitism scholar Derek Penslar to head a task force on the issue. After criticism of Penslar, who had signed an open letter critical of Israel's treatment of Palestinians, Slate columnist Emily Tamkin said his critics were weaponizing antisemitism.

Following restrictions on pro-Palestinian protests at universities, several Jewish organizations, activists, and scholars said the second Trump administration was using antisemitism as a pretext for anti-democratic and authoritarian actions. Kenneth S. Stern said the Trump administration was "absolutely weaponizing antisemitism" to curtail "speech we don't like", in "a total assault on the university". Representative Jerry Nadler said Trump was "weaponizing the real pain American Jews face to advance his desire to wield control". Nadler also criticized cuts to the Office for Civil Rights, which terminated nearly half its staff, as contradicting Trump's claim to combat antisemitism. Shaul Magid, a rabbi and Jewish studies scholar, has suggested that Republicans used congressional hearings about antisemitism to attack universities' diversity, equity and inclusion policies rather than to address campus antisemitism.

Lara Deeba and Jessica Winegarb, anthropologists of the Middle East, suggest antisemitism has been weaponized in the U.S. against pro-Palestinian students and university staff in an attempt to "silence pro-Palestinian speech, abolish anti-racist teaching and diversity initiatives, eliminate academic freedom, and question the value of higher education in general".

In September 2025, a federal judge ruled against Trump's funding freeze for Harvard University, finding that it was "difficult to conclude anything other than that [the Trump administration] used antisemitism as a smokescreen for a targeted, ideologically-motivated assault on this country's premier universities, and did so in a way that runs afoul of [federal law]".

Between January and June 2025, nine U.S. attorneys at the U.S. Department of Justice resigned because of the pressure they felt from the Trump administration to conclude that University of California (UC) campuses had violated the civil rights of Jewish students and staff. Middle East Monitor reported that Ejaz Baluch, a trial attorney assigned the task of finding antisemitism at the University of California, Los Angeles (UCLA) called the exercise "unserious": "It was not about trying to find out what really happened", he added. A federal judge found that the Trump administration's proposed settlement with UC was "coercive and retaliatory" and likely violated the First Amendment.

Daniel Ian Rubin and Mara Grayson criticized the University of California, Santa Cruz Critical Race and Ethnic Studies department's statement following the October 7 attacks for not condemning the attacks and instead decrying supposed "underhanded efforts" by Jewish nonprofits to "smear" the department's Institute for the Critical Study of Zionism as antisemitic. Rubin and Grayson analyzed the statement as preemptively deflecting accusations of antisemitism by "declaring that any such accusation is strategically designed and unscrupulously deployed to silence criticism of Israel", reinforcing antisemitic tropes about conspiracy and Jewish dishonesty.

==== International law disputes ====
In February 2022, when Amnesty International reported that Israel was committing apartheid in Israel and the Occupied Palestinian Territories, Israel rejected the findings and denounced them as antisemitic. Amnesty secretary general Agnes Callamard called the Israeli officials' responses "baseless attacks, barefaced lies, fabrications on the messenger". Human rights advocates subsequently argued that the criticism of the report constituted weaponization of antisemitism.

During the Gaza war, pro-Israel advocates, including speakers, writers, and politicians, were accused of weaponizing antisemitism to silence valid criticism of Israel. Political scientist Omar Shahabudin McDoom has written that accusations of antisemitism play two roles in what he calls Gaza genocide denial: claiming that Israel is unfairly targeted in an orchestrated campaign motivated by antisemitism, and attacking the motivations of critics of Israel's genocide. Martin Shaw has written that Israel's supporters use the ideology of anti-antisemitism as institutionalized in the U.S., Germany, and other Western countries to block recognition of the genocide.

When the International Criminal Court (ICC) was rumored to be preparing arrest warrants for Israeli officials, including Prime minister Benjamin Netanyahu, Aryeh Neier said that Netanyahu's assertion "that ICC indictments would be antisemitic is indicative of his promiscuous use of antisemitism allegations". Shortly thereafter, on 20 May 2024, the ICC announced that it was seeking arrest warrants against Israeli leaders, and Netanyahu called chief prosecutor Karim Ahmad Khan one of the "great antisemites in modern times", saying that Khan was "callously pouring gasoline on the fires of antisemitism that are raging across the world". Kenneth Roth said Netanyahu's response was a "common last resort for defenders of Israel" that endangered Jews: "if people see the charge of antisemitism as a thin cover for Israeli war crimes, it will cheapen the concept at a time when a strong defense is needed."

In February 2024, Israeli officials accused the International Court of Justice of antisemitism following South Africa's genocide case against Israel. Anthony Lerman wrote in Declassified UK that the officials' "weaponised antisemitism to deflect criticism" and that "using past experience of anti-Jewish persecution to neutralise criticism of, and generate sympathy for, the Jewish state [...] is decades old".

=== The left and the right ===
In a 2021 independent study funded by the office of the UK Government's Independent Adviser on Antisemitism (Lord Mann), academics Daniel Allington and Tanvi Joshi found that alternative media outlets, including The Skwawkbox and The Canary on the left and Tommy Robinson's TR News on the right, often represent Jews and Zionists as raising antisemitism in bad faith.

==== Political left ====
A 2024 study by the French Foundation for Political Innovation found that "those close to [left-wing party] La France Insoumise criticize what they perceive as an abusive use of the accusation of anti-Semitism, which they believe is aimed at muzzling criticism of the Israeli government", giving as an example party founder Jean-Luc Mélenchon's references to the "paralyzing radius of anti-Semitism" and "genuflections" before the Representative Council of French Jewish Institutions in French politics. Eva Illouz wrote in Fathom in 2026 that La France Insoumise was an example of a rising tendency among radical left groups in Europe and North America to "dismiss Jewish testimony about antisemitism as an attempt to silence criticism".

===== UK Labour Party =====
In 2012, British Labour MP and future party leader Jeremy Corbyn defended British priest Stephen Sizer against criticism for sharing on Facebook links to an antisemitic website promoting conspiracy theories about Jews, including that "Israel and wealthy Jews" were responsible for the September 11 attacks. Corbyn said Sizer's posts had been a "technical oversight", and that Sizer "seems to have come under attack by certain individuals intent on discrediting the excellent work that Stephen does in highlighting the injustices of the Palestinian Israeli situation", which Corbyn said was "part of a wider pattern of demonising those who dare to stand up and speak out against Zionism". Corbyn continued to back Sizer even as he wrote on his church's website that "Zionism seeks exclusive Jewish sovereignty over much of the Middle East" and attended a conference in Iran that promoted Holocaust denial and 9/11 conspiracies implicating Israel. When the Church of England suspended Sizer for six months as a result of his activities, Corbyn suggested that the Church authorities were partaking in a pro-Israel smear campaign against Sizer.

In 2017, senior Labour MP John Cryer compared tweets written by party members to 1930s antisemitism, and said that while some members dismiss reports of antisemitism in the party as a myth, "you don't have to look very far before you see it's not a myth...and there's no place in the Labour Party for stuff like that."

In 2018, in light of accusations of antisemitism in the British Labour Party under Corbyn's leadership, Communities Secretary Sajid Javid called a debate on antisemitism in Parliament. At the debate, Jewish Labour MPs Luciana Berger and Ruth Smeeth spoke of their experiences of being accused of weaponizing antisemitism. Lesley Klaff says Berger experienced online antisemitic and misogynistic harassment by Corbyn supporters who saw her "as deliberately manufacturing a crisis within the Labour Party by making false accusations about antisemitism". Anthony Lerman said that "many hyperbolic claims" were made against Corbyn himself and that such claims "politicized antisemitism" and emptied the word of utility. In Palestine Chronicle, Ronnie Kasrils compared the charges to a witch hunt and to rhetorical strategies against the South-African anti-apartheid movement. A 2018 YouGov poll of paying Labour members found that 77% believed that the "extent [of the issue of antisemitism] is being deliberately exaggerated to damage Labour and Jeremy Corbyn or to stifle criticism of Israel". Support for Labour among British Jews fell to 13% during the affair. In 2019, expelled former Labour MP George Galloway called the claims of antisemitism in the party "foul slander", a "Goebbelian lie", and a "black op" against Corbyn, and expressed disbelief in Luciana Berger's claims that she was leaving the Labour party because of antisemitism.

In 2020, the Equality and Human Rights Commission investigated claims of antisemitism in the UK Labour Party, concluding that investigators should treat complaints of antisemitism in good faith according to the Macpherson principle, (Note: This is the British legal principle that all complaints of racism should be recorded and investigated as such when the complainant or someone else perceives them as acts of racism.) and that dismissing reports of antisemitism without investigation could itself be antisemitic. It said party agents who suggested complaints of antisemitism were "fake or smears" could be guilty of "unlawful harassment". It also said that Jewish members, in particular, were accused of trying to "undermine the Labour Party" with reports of antisemitism, and that this "ignores legitimate and genuine complaints of antisemitism in the Party". In response to the report, several formal complaints were filed against Labour MPs. The Jewish Labour Movement said, "We were told that this racism was imagined, fabricated for factional advantage or intended to silence debate. Today's report confirms that our voices were marginalised and our members victimised". Gideon Falter, leader of the Campaign Against Antisemitism, said that the EHRC report "utterly vindicates Britain's Jews who were accused of lying and exaggerating, acting as agents of another country and using their religion to 'smear' the Labour party". Similarly, the Antisemitism Policy Trust's 2020 report on antisemitism in the Labour Party said that some Labour activists had "dismissed [Anti-Jewish hatred] as a 'smear' or as being 'weaponised' by its victims for political ends", which they said was against the Macpherson principle and not supported by the evidence. In 2019, Labour suspended member Asa Winstanley after he called the Jewish Labour Movement an "Israeli embassy proxy" that had engaged in "shameless sabotage of the party" by allegedly fabricating antisemitism and submitting a dossier on antisemitism in the party to the EHRC commission. Winstanley wrote of the suspension in his 2023 book Weaponising Anti-Semitism: "[Labour's] attempt to censor me was not personal. It was more an attempt to gag the Palestinians." In 2022, Corbyn's successor as Labour leader, Keir Starmer, commissioned the Forde Report, which said antisemitism had been used as a "factional weapon" between the party's anti-Corbyn and pro-Corbyn camps.

Michael S. Broschowitz writes that Labour leadership responded to the controversy using a pattern of DARVO tactics:

This coordinated pattern involved three sequential operations: denying the antisemitic character of documented incidents by reframing them as "legitimate criticism of Israel," attacking complainants as politically motivated actors seeking to "weaponize antisemitism allegations," and ultimately reversing victim-offender relationships by characterizing Jewish members raising concerns as the primary threat to party unity and progressive values.

According to Dave Rich, Labour's worldview "made it possible for antisemitic ideas to be expressed and defended as legitimate political discourse, while Jewish concerns about antisemitism were dismissed as attempts to silence criticism." Of the Labour affair, Howard Jacobson wrote:

That Jews invoke anti-Semitism primarily to silence critics of Israel is a tired canard, but it continues to be pressed in to service. It serves a purpose: It libels the Jews as liars in the act of protesting innocence of any such offense.

Balazs Berkovits wrote that defenders of the Corbyn left throughout the scandal employed rhetoric similar to French discourse about a supposed "state philosemitism", according to which "Jewish middle and upper classes willingly identify and collude with power elites [and attack] left-wing and working-class Jews." According to Berkovits, this idea "strives to legitimize attacks and critiques conducted against Jews [...] as something that is just targeting power elites", by first asserting that "power elites, Jews included, attack left-wingers with the antisemitism smear, [such that] the concept of antisemitism is hollowed out, instrumentalized in an absurd fashion, and turned into its opposite."

In 2019, Alan Johnson wrote, "far too many Labour Party members assert without any evidence whatsoever that claims of antisemitism are [...] a Zionist fabrication [...] a club wielded instrumentally, with malice aforethought, by bullying Jews", and that these Labour members were in denial about their party's antisemitism. He called the "smear" narrative "the crudest form of antisemitism denial" and a component of antisemitic anti-Zionism that victim-blames Jews who complain of antisemitism.

==== Political right ====
===== Europe =====
The German far-right has accused Jews of "using the Antisemitismuskeule" (lit. 'antisemitism club/cudgel') in relation to new antisemitism, nationalism, and neo-Nazism. German studies scholar Caroline Pearce describes the phrase as a "common far-right term" in contemporary German politics. For example, Jörg Meuthen initially described criticism of Wolfgang Gedeon's writings—which have been widely described as antisemitic—as attempts by political opponents to wield the Antisemitismuskeule against the AfD. He later reversed his position, calling Gedeon's statements "crystal clearly anti-Semitic". Gideon Botsch, a German political scientist specializing in the far right and antisemitism, has said that, in Germany, far-right claims of weaponization of antisemitism, especially in relation to criticism of Israel, are often overlooked because of a tendency to attribute anti-Israel antisemitism to the left and Islam and to treat far-right antisemitism as a separate, historical phenomenon. The National Democratic Party of Germany (NDP) cites Norman Finkelstein (named on the party's website "the Jew Norman Finkelstein) and his book The Holocaust Industry in its explanation of the NDP's stance on antisemitism, questioning the term's meaning and framing the charge of antisemitism as a form of blackmail and "psychological warfare" employed by "Jewish power groups" such as the Central Council of Jews in Germany.

In 1967, Jewish writer Moshe Menuhin wrote in the German far-right publication National-Zeitung that antisemitism charges were "becoming more and more a weapon of propaganda serving Zionist aims". During the 1984–1985 trial of James Keegstra for promoting hatred against Jews, Keegstra told the court that antisemitism was, in the words of Alan T. Davies, "a smear word invented by Jews to obscure their conspiratorial activities" and "divert public attention from the truth."

Upon resigning from the far-right National Front party (now National Rally) in 2011, Jean-Marie Le Pen suggested in an address that "Jews cry wolf, unduly claiming to be victims of anti-Semitism", and that a journalist who had claimed he was racially insulted and violently expelled from a party meeting "could say that it was because he was Jewish that he had been expelled... It could not be seen, neither on his card nor on his nose, if I dare say." The party's next leader, his daughter Marine Le Pen, said the claim of antisemitism was a lie. French comedian Dieudonné included in his 2010 show Mahmoud (named for Iranian president Mahmoud Ahmadinejad) a sketch in which he complains of "the blackmail of antisemitism" after being called antisemitic by a Jewish character depicted as racist and neurotic. Scholars Stephen W. Sawyer and Roman Zinigrad interpret this sketch as an attempt to spread antisemitic material beyond the far right, intended to appeal to leftists and descendants of immigrants in France.

In a 2022 opinion piece, Spokesperson of the Government of Hungary Zoltán Kovács denied American diplomat Ira Forman's claims that Hungarian president Viktor Orbán is antisemitic, and decried "attempt[s] to play the tired antisemitism card over and over again [...] because this charge of antisemitism is a political tool that disregards the facts to push an agenda that has no democratic legitimacy."

===== United States =====
In 1990, American conservative political commentator Pat Buchanan wrote in response to New York Times columnist A. M. Rosenthal accusing him of antisemitism and blood libel for defending accused Nazi war criminals and calling Washington, D.C. "Israeli-occupied territory". Buchanan called Rosenthal's column a "contract hit" ordered by the ADL's Abe Foxman, and said that the label of antisemite is a "branding iron wielded by a tiny clique ... to frighten, intimidate, censor and silence ... to scar men so indelibly that no one will ever look at them again without saying, 'Say, isn't he an antisemite?'" Buchanan called this a "contemptible attempt to stifle debate" about U.S.–Israel relations. Elsewhere, Buchanan blamed "a small group" of Jewish leaders who "are going after Pat Buchanan's reputation because they can't answer his columns, his facts and his opinions" and wrote that "a lot of Americans ... are very intimidated from saying candidly what they think about the relationship with Israel. They're afraid of just what's been done to me." He compared himself to a victim of lynching. Jewish community leaders criticized the column as antisemitic, but generally defended Buchanan's freedom of expression. Commenting on Rosenthal's column the next month on The McLaughlin Group, Buchanan said Rosenthal was "orchestrating a pre-planned smear campaign against me. What [the ADL is] trying to do is an effort to silence me". He also said campaigners were pressuring newspapers to drop his column. Foxman denied that the ADL had or would lobby any newspaper to drop Buchanan's column. American lawyer Alan Dershowitz said that Buchanan should be pulled from TV and newspapers for his comments, comparing him as a bigot undeserving of circulation or airtime to Meir Kahane and Louis Farrakhan. The New York Post editor Eric Breindel rebuked Buchanan in the same issue in which his controversial column ran, highlighting Buchanan's denial that Jews were gassed at Treblinka and his stated belief that Nazi concentration camp guard and convicted war criminal John Demjanjuk was innocent. Rosenthal called Buchanan's column "nonsense" and denied the suggestion that he equates criticism of Israel with antisemitism.

Right-wing American political commentators Candace Owens and Tucker Carlson have claimed that accusations of antisemitism are used to silence people, with Owens complaining of "ultimately Marxist [...] D.C. Jews" raising allegations of antisemitism and Jew-hatred "not because they believed that what they were hearing was actually antisemitism or Jew-hating, but to basically silence people." Owens said separately that Charlie Kirk and Elon Musk have been victims of weaponized claims of antisemitism. During an interview with Theo Von, Carlson denied being an antisemite and said he was being labeled a Nazi in order to silence his opinions.

U.S. Vice President JD Vance said in 2025 that the influence of antisemitic rhetoric by far-right commentator Nick Fuentes on the Trump administration is "overstated by people who want to avoid having a foreign policy conversation about America's relationship with Israel". The same month, he said, "I think it's kind of slanderous to say that the Republican Party, the conservative movement, is extremely antisemitic."

American neo-Nazi and former Ku Klux Klan Grand Wizard David Duke has alleged that the charge of antisemitism is generally a smear used by Zionists in an effort to silence political speech. In 2007, Duke wrote:

It is perfectly acceptable to criticize any nation on the earth for its errors and wrongs, but lo and behold, don't you dare criticize Israel; for if you do that, you will be accused of the most abominable sin in the modern world, the unforgivable sin of anti-Semitism!

Duke said in 2015 that Jeremy Corbyn was elected leader of the UK Labour Party "despite a massive smear campaign by Britain's Zio-establishment over his association with anti-Zionist activists." Duke also praised Roger Waters after German police investigated Waters for allegations of antisemitism. He encouraged Waters, who he said was being attacked "for daring to expose Israel's crimes and the crimes of the Jewish-controlled US government and media", to go further in rejecting of the charge of antisemitism by asserting that "antisemitism is nothing more of vile smear [sic] against anyone who dares to expose the UltraRacist Jewish globalists behind both the Palestinian Nakba but also the insane Ukraine war". In 2010, Waters said the charge of antisemitism is "a screen [the ADL] hides behind" after the ADL said an animation displayed during Waters's tour, showing a bomber plane dropping stars of David beside dollar signs, had "crossed the line into anti-Semitism". In 2014, two authors of an open letter in The Lancet accusing Israel of manufacturing a pretext to massacre Gazans endorsed a video by Duke titled "CNN Goldman Sachs & the Zio Matrix". The Lancet editor-in-chief Richard Horton declined to retract the letter, calling the revelations "utterly irrelevant" and a "smear campaign".

===== Israel =====
Illouz says that "In casting dissenters and critics of Israel as antisemites, the Israeli political right has created an unprecedented line of fracture within the Jewish people, one that privileges the political interests of the State of Israel over its solidarity with liberal Jews; and it favors the aims of Israel internal policy to the detriment of the struggle against antisemitism... The weaponization of antisemitism will likely accentuate an already deep divide in the Jewish people, between those who fight antisemitism in the name of international norms of justice and those who will make the struggle against antisemitism ancillary to Israeli politics of expansion."

===== Opposition to immigration =====
Several commentators have suggested that political groups on the populist right and far-right weaponize antisemitism to demonize immigrants, especially Muslims, and obscure their own antisemitism. Political scientist Jelena Subotić suggests that parties such as the AfD and Fidesz first declare support for Israel and Benjamin Netanyahu, then portray their "hostility to Islam and Muslim immigration to Europe" as defending European Jews, as a "shield" from their own antisemitism. She describes this as part of a growing "pro-Israel antisemitism".

Stanford University professor Cécile Alduy (fr) says the National Rally has "started to target the supposed entrenched antisemitism of immigrants of Muslim heritage" and pretends to "protect the Jewish community from them" as a way to obscure its own antisemitic past. Rachel Shabi writes that "wrapped in the Israeli flag, far-right parties with fascist roots and current displays of antisemitism cast themselves as defenders of Jews against an antisemitism claimed to be coming from Muslims and migrants".

=== German anti-antisemitism ===
The culture of anti-antisemitism in Germany has been described by Gert Krell, Heidrun Friese and Yuval Abraham as weaponizing antisemitism and compared by Candice Breitz to McCarthyism. Similar criticisms have been made about Austrian politics and academia by Author Collective scăpa شاه.

In 2019, the German Bundestag passed resolutions declaring the Boycott, Divestment and Sanctions (BDS) movement antisemitic and compared it to the 1933 Nazi boycott of Jewish businesses. This comparison—and the belief that BDS is "nothing less than the start of a road to another Holocaust"—is prevalent in German discourse.

240 Jewish and Israeli intellectuals, including some specialised in antisemitism and Holocaust research, wrote an open letter criticizing the resolution. Signatories included Alon Confino, Amos Goldberg, and Avi Shlaim. The letter said:

We conclude that the rise in anti-Semitism is clearly not the concern which inspired the motion adopted by the Bundestag. On the contrary, this motion is driven by political interests and policies of Israel’s most right-wing government in history.
For years, the Israeli government under Prime Minister Benjamin Netanyahu has been labelling any opposition to its illegal and peace-undermining policies as anti-Semitic. No one can be surprised that Netanyahu warmly welcomed the motion by the Bundestag. This embrace illustrates how the fight against anti-Semitism is being instrumentalized to shield policies of the Israeli government that cause severe violations of human rights and that destroy the chances for peace.

Commenting on the leftist "Anti-German" movement in Germany, Esther Bejarano said that criticism of Israel's policies is not the same as antisemitism, adding, "I did not survive the Auschwitz extermination camp, the Ravensbrück concentration camp and the death march, to be insulted as an 'anti-Semite' by so-called Anti-Germans."

In response to Andreas Malm's criticism of German anti-antisemitism as inhibiting the liberation of Palestine, Matthew Bolton compares his apparent view, wherein "endless, groundless, manipulative cries of antisemitism" inhibit the creation of a Palestinian state, to the right-wing German view that Germany must "close the book on the past" and restore German nationalism against the "cynical leveraging of historical suffering".

=== IHRA working definition of antisemitism ===
The IHRA definition of antisemitism is the "non-legally binding working definition of antisemitism" that the International Holocaust Remembrance Alliance (IHRA) adopted in 2016. It is also known as the IHRA working definition of antisemitism (IHRA-WDA). It was first published in 2005 by the European Monitoring Centre on Racism and Xenophobia (EUMC), a European Union agency. Accompanying the working definition are 11 illustrative examples, seven of which relate to criticism of Israel, that the IHRA describes as guiding its work on antisemitism.

In 2011, the UK's University and College Union Congress debated a motion to formally reject the IHRA's working definition of antisemitism. Antisemitism scholar David Hirsh said the definition was "denounced as a bad-faith attempt to say that criticism of Israel was antisemitic". According to Małgorzata Waśniewska, the IHRA definition and the Three Ds of antisemitism criteria sought to counter the notion that claims of antisemitism are a ploy used to silence critique of Israel.

In 2019, 2024, and 2025, Kenneth S. Stern, the lead author of the original definition, said it had become weaponized by Donald Trump and right-wing Jewish groups in ways that threatened to suppress and limit free speech in the U.S. Stern said Trump's Executive Order on Combating Anti-Semitism, aimed at university campuses in particular, would "harm not only pro-Palestinian advocates, but also Jewish students and faculty, and the academy itself".

A 2023 report by the British Society for Middle Eastern Studies analyzed 40 cases where UK university staff and/or students were accused of antisemitism on the basis of the IHRA definition between 2017 and 2022, and found that in 38 cases, the accusations were dismissed, with two yet to be resolved. According to the report, false accusations of antisemitism have caused staff and students severe stress.

In 2023, Middle East scholar Nathan J. Brown and Israeli academic and peace activist Daniel Nerenberg wrote in +972 Magazine that the definition, though created in good faith, had been weaponized by groups including the Zionist Organization of America, the American Jewish Committee, and the Brandeis Center. In 2024, Holocaust scholar Raz Segal wrote: "The weaponization of antisemitism by Israel and its allies, including the U.S. government, draws on the deeply problematic 'working definition of antisemitism' adopted in 2016 by the International Holocaust Remembrance Alliance (IHRA)." Jonathan Hafetz and Sahar Aziz made a similar argument about the definition's use against critics of Israel's actions during its war on Gaza.

Philosopher Eve Garrard, writing in Fathom, countered the idea that the IHRA definition suppresses free speech critical of Israel, writing that the IHRA definition and examples are "peppered with conditional verbs", which Garrard attributes to an adherence to necessary caution in discussions of racism.

The only view which this definition threatens is the view that criticism of Israel can never, ever, in any circumstances, be antisemitic. But this is not a view which is even remotely plausible (although some critics of the IHRA definition do seem to find it attractive).

Responding to widespread criticism that the definition classifies legitimate speech on Israel as antisemitic, philosopher Bernard Harrison and legal scholar Lesley Klaff argued that such criticism was unfounded, as the definition encompasses only antisemitic rhetoric about Israel, rather than all criticism of Israel. In an examination of scholarly criticisms of the definition as a threat to free speech, they find that most "give credence to this non-sequitur" that accusations of antisemitism against the BDS movement are invariably cynical. Harrison and Klaff write that, under the definition of antisemitism apparently favored by those who criticize the IHRA definition as threatening to legitimate criticism of Israel ("hostility towards Jews as Jews", in the words of Stephen Sedley), "it would appear to follow that no criticism of Israel, however 'hostile' or 'extreme', can be antisemitic. For criticism of Israel, even 'hostility' towards Israel is criticism directed not towards 'Jews as Jews' but towards a political entity: a state." They write that the definition of antisemitism as such is problematically limited, excluding antisemitism that manifests in political doctrine, and that the IHRA definition correctly describes antisemitic defamation of Israel and its (Jewish and non-Jewish) supporters without limiting legitimate political criticism.

== Responses ==
Some scholars have said that charges of weaponized antisemitism often seek to delegitimize complaints of anti-Jewish sentiment, are antisemitic, or draw on antisemitic tropes about Jewish power and deception. Scholars such as Matthias J. Becker, Mark Goldfeder, Robert Fine, and Kenneth Waltzer have said charges of weaponization are themselves antisemitic and rely on stereotypes of Jews that portray them as dishonest or greedy. In an article in Fathom, John Hyman and Anthony Julius wrote in response to claims of false charges of antisemitism, "that Jews lie is an established antisemitic defamation" given "canonical form" by Martin Luther in On The Jews and Their Lies and Heinrich von Treitschke's view that "Jews stand for 'Lug und Trug'" (lit. 'lying and cheating'). Michael S. Broschowitz connects the trope with Augustine of Hippo's writings on Jewish–Christian relations, which he said established a framework that interprets Jewish complaints of antisemitism as evidence of their manipulative nature.

Political scientist Lars Rensmann has said that while complaints about "illegitimate racism charges" are generally unacceptable in society, accusations that Jews are weaponizing antisemitism are "almost ubiquitous" and nearly always lack evidence. Glynis Cousin and Robert Fine write: "opportunist cries of racism or antisemitism will always be part of the story of any field of racist prejudice. To treat concern over antisemitism as exclusively opportunist denies integrity to those vulnerable to it." Daniel Elbaum of the American Jewish Committee criticized a 2017 New School lecture about supposedly illegitimate claims of antisemitism, and suggested that a double standard exists for ascribing bad faith to claims of bigotry against Jews: "Would [The New School] sponsor a similarly one-sided discussion on the misuse of the charge of racism? What about homophobia? What about Islamophobia? Would it, or has it, sponsored any similar type of event with such a one-sided discussion on any topic other than Israel? The answers are no. Apparently, the only interest in an exploration of the false claim of prejudice is when one talks about claims of prejudice against Jews."

Rensmann and German historian Julius H. Schoeps compare claims of a "general misuse of 'antisemitism'" to claims that racism more generally is "only a 'political weapon' of powerful groups to suppress 'the white people.'" They write that the notion of weaponization is often accompanied by ethnic stereotyping and the downplaying of antisemitism, and is common among the far left, the New Right, and "various European publics". David Schraub says the charge of weaponization "presents marginalized persons as inherently untrustworthy, unbelievable, or lacking in the basic understandings regarding the true meaning of discrimination". The American Jewish Committee's Translate Hate Glossary lists "silencing" as an antisemitic theme, calling it "one of the longest standing antisemitic attacks leveled against Jews" that "Jews deem any criticism of Israel or the Jewish people as antisemitic, and wield the power of the antisemitic label to silence the opposition". The AJC links the concept with the trope of "Jewish control".

Becker, a hate speech scholar, says the charge that Jews "instrumentalize antisemitism" for political or financial gain is connected to the claim they "instrumentalize the Holocaust", which he says can lead to Holocaust distortion and denial. Becker interprets this trope in post-WWII German and Austrian society (in German, die Antisemitismus- oder Auschwitz-Keule schwingen, lit. 'wielding the antisemitism or Auschwitz club') as a "collective reflex" in the context of reckoning with Nazi history. Before the Holocaust, Becker writes, the mainstream acceptability of antisemitism meant that the charge of antisemitism could not be imagined as a powerful weapon, and as such the trope that Jews instrumentalize antisemitism is a post-WWII phenomenon. Similarly, Julius called the trope of weaponization of antisemitism a version of the "libel" that Jews are "liars and deceivers, hoodwinking others by making false claims about themselves". Becker writes that the "instrumentalization" notion exists in extremist as well as mainstream discourses.

Paul Bogdanor writes that, in Britain, "any outburst, no matter how prejudiced, can be written off as mere criticism of the Israeli government ... Conversely, protest against such outbursts is labeled as a clever (but easily exposed) ploy to silence the poor critic, who courageously refuses to be intimidated by the threat of verbal crucifixion." He links this rhetoric to notions of "Jewish deviousness and dishonesty, Jewish domination of public debate, and Christian martyrdom at the hands of the Jews." Robin Shepherd called the notion that Israel's supporters use the charge of antisemitism to suppress criticism of Israel "a mantra much beloved of Israel's opponents [that] refuses to go away." Shepherd writes that the frequency of this claim appears defensive, and reveals "a vague awareness by the anti-Israeli constituency that they are engaged in something troubling... They protest too much."

In 2015, Marcus wrote that after antisemitic incidents occur, people invariably "argue about whether the incident was really anti-Semitic or whether the Jewish complainants are instead trying to smear and silence the innocent", which often means "the accuser is punished" for speaking up. In response to the English Wikipedia article "Weaponization of antisemitism", Marcus told the Jewish News Syndicate:

The so-called 'weaponization' is really more of a smear against Jewish advocates and should be recognized in that way [...] Advocates for the Jewish community, such as myself, are very aware of the dangers of exaggeration and have been clear about the need for objective assessments [...] This should be seen as an indication that weaponization charges are, at best, exaggerated or distorted and, at worst, fabricated.

Legal scholars Schraub, Dov Waxman and Adam Hosein have said that accusations of bad faith are often made about those who raise charges of antisemitism—especially Jews—because "antisemitism today is not always easy to identify or even define". They suggest that accusations of bad faith may be defused by clarifying which of the potential understandings of antisemitism is being invoked, and that "persons who encounter a Jewish claim of antisemitism [should] at least adopt a presumptive disposition towards taking that claim seriously and considering it with an open mind".

Of antisemitism in 21st-century French pro-Palestinian rhetoric, Pierre-André Taguieff wrote:

We regularly observe that more or less well-intentioned, but always ill-informed, figures publicly assert that "there is no antisemitism in France," or that antisemitism in France is "declining," or even "disappearing." Some add that it is time to "put an end" to "the blackmail of antisemitism." This is the main argument of self-proclaimed anti-Jews, who identify as radical anti-Zionists, and who thus seek to present themselves as victims of an intolerable "censorship" in a democratic society. [...] Their objective is clear: to make people believe that the accusation of "anti-Semitism" is merely a perverse way to discredit, without reason, an individual who wants to "fight against the injustice done to the Palestinians."

Citing Taguieff, Marc Angenot wrote:

To the accusation of "anti-Semitism," whether founded or not, the opposing side will shout even louder, denouncing the "blackmail of anti-Semitism" and the "censorship" of which they are a victim. To the accusation of "Islamophobia," no less widespread, the other side will cry out, even louder if possible, about "blackmail of Islamophobia," and so on—each side loudly invoking "freedom of expression," transformed into a democratic absolute trampled by the opposing side.

In 2012, Ben Cohen compared German anti-circumcision rhetoric to left-wing anti-Zionist rhetoric in their "deflections" of accusations of antisemitism, writing:

The core message [in the rhetoric] is unmistakable: whether the topic at hand is Israeli foreign policy or the ancient religious rites of the Jewish people, critics will invariably be silenced by the invocation of anti-Semitism. Anticipating this tactic—by portraying it as a red herring designed to turn attention away from the critical imperative of protecting the bodies of defenseless children from the backward customs of their parents—is one means of defeating it. Another is to find an individual of Jewish origin to prop up the anti-ritual [circumcision] position.

Emanuele Ottolenghi writes that, in Italy, "there is a tendency to downplay antisemitism by associating it exclusively with either radicalised members of Arab and Muslim immigrant communities or extreme right-wing groups, and to dismiss accusations of antisemitism as attempts to gag critics of Israel's policies."

In 2025, Executive Council of Australian Jewry leader Alex Ryvchin said of antisemitism denial in Australia: "How often do we hear that Jews exaggerate or falsify antisemitism? That we 'cry' antisemitism, a crude formulation intended to silence and intimidate us. And that we do so for some dark and insidious purpose. For money, for sympathy, to cunningly shield the government of Israel from criticism. And if the burning synagogues, the burning cars, the public abuse of schoolchildren, the harassment of university students and artists, are too blatant to deny, the Jews brought it upon themselves."

=== Political left ===
Rensmann has said that some Marxist and post-Marxist thinkers, such as Judith Butler, do not "recognize current antisemitism" but only the "chilling effect" of "bad-faith" charges of antisemitism. Robert Fine has criticized progressive perspectives (such as those of Butler, Alain Badiou, Tony Judt, and Göran Therborn) on the charge of antisemitism as primarily weaponized, saying they abandon "inclusive universalism" to stigmatize others and treat "instrumentalizing the charge of antisemitism" as intrinsic to antisemitism itself. Neil J. Kressel criticized Judith Butler for "paying lip service" by saying that "every progressive person ought to challenge anti-semitism vigorously" but doing nothing to combat it, while being willing to take action, in the form of boycott and protest, to combat Israel. Kressel also criticized Brian Klug, who called new antisemitism a myth and wrote in 2004: "There is no such war [of global antisemitism]. It is, in fact, as much a figment of the imagination as its mirror image: a Jewish conspiracy against the world." Kressel added, "Klug's primary concern—anti-Israel politics—apparently hinders his ability to gauge the intensity of old-style Jew-hatred in the Muslim and Arab world." In 2013, Denis MacShane wrote that "in England the main obsession of many academics is with accusing people who raise concerns about antisemitism of doing so simply and solely as a form of pro-Israel advocacy. Klug leads that charge".

Writing about what he calls "antisemitism denial" on the European left, Robert Fine described a new paradigm under which progressives refuse to take antisemitism seriously in the context of criticism of Israel: "The struggle against antisemitism, once seen as central to the construction of a new Europe after the war, is increasingly disavowed on the grounds that the charge of antisemitism merely serves to deflect or devalue criticism of Israeli occupation, Israeli human rights abuses, Israeli racism toward Arabs, and Israeli military force ... Paradoxically, it seems that it is no longer antisemitism that is troubling Europe but talk of antisemitism." Fine wrote that those who raise the issue of antisemitism are accused of "playing the antisemitism card", ignoring more serious forms of racism, or inciting Islamophobia. He linked this discourse to complaints that an unnamed "they" are trying to use Holocaust memory to insulate Israel from criticism.

Camilla Brenni et al. criticized the French left for ignoring and minimizing antisemitism, and the radical left in particular for never discussing antisemitism except as an issue tactically instrumentalized against the movement. They wrote that the left's defensive posture against the supposed "blackmail" of antisemitism prevents any reflection on tropes that infuse antisemitism in both the sovereigntist left and the nationalist right.

In Jews and the Left: The Rise and Fall of a Political Alliance, Philip Mendes quotes Noam Chomsky as an example of a denier of Jewish experiences of victimhood typical of the post-1967 left:

Jews in the USA are the most privileged and influential part of the population. … Anti-Semitism is no longer a problem, fortunately. It's raised, but it's raised because privileged people want to make sure they have total control, not just 98 per cent control.

Mendes also writes that the little seriousness with which the contemporary left treats antisemitism is partly because "Some [left] anti-Zionists openly reject the right of Jews to define what they experience as racism, and imply that Jews only raise accusations of anti-Semitism as a manipulative and dishonest strategy to suppress legitimate criticisms of Israel."

Sina Arnold and Blair Taylor say charges of weaponizing antisemitism are a common way of "shutting down" discussions of antisemitism in the contemporary American Left, along with changing the subject to Israel or right-wing antisemitism. Arnold and Taylor attribute this to "unexamined political assumptions" and ignorance about the nature of antisemitism rather than "conscious antisemitic intent". Rıfat Bali writes that the left's "sensitivity toward the phenomenon of antisemitism in Turkey tends to be quite low" due to the belief that Israel weaponizes the charge of antisemitism against criticism. Bali cites the example of Nuray Mert, who said that Israel "tries to pressure everyone who opposes Israel's policies, whether in the Muslim world or in general [by accusing them of being anti-Semites]" in the context of her criticism of antisemitism in Islamist Turkish media responses to the 2006 Lebanon War.

Mikael Shainkman writes that the contemporary left openly condemns right-wing antisemitism but is unable to recognize antisemitism disguised as criticism of Israel, instead calling those who raise the issue Zionists acting in bad faith. Jovan Byford says there has been a "contamination" of antisemitic motifs in leftist politics due to the belief that antisemitism is less of a social problem than the accusation of antisemitism itself, "which 'the Lobby' uses to silence opponents and de-legitimize criticism of Israel". In 2025, Lilach Marom wrote, "universities cannot dismiss antisemitism as a political whip by conservatives, since by doing so they reproduce conspiracy tropes and downplay the sincerity of Jewish experiences". Ronnie Fraser wrote in 2015 that, on British university campuses, "when pro-Israeli activists complain ... [of] outrageous and unsubstantiated claims about Israel and Jews, some of which cross the line into anti-Semitism ... they are accused of attempting to shut down discussion of Israel." He attributed this phenomenon in part to the lack of a consensus definition of antisemitism among British Jews to effectively identify antisemitism when it takes the form of anti-Israel and anti-Zionist sentiment.

Emanuele Ottolenghi wrote in 2007 that the political left "sees itself as immune from anti-Semitism, which it considers the exclusive province of the xenophobic right". In the view of Israel's leftist critics, Ottolenghi writes, "Instead of crying wolf and allowing Israel to use the charge of anti-Semitism to deflect criticism, Jews should denounce both Israel and the misuse of anti-Semitism as a smokescreen for injustice." Ottolenghi criticizes the notion in leftist discourse of a "moral imperative" for Jews to denounce Israel and "to save themselves from moral complicity with its policies and in order to escape 'the blackmail of anti-Semitism'—the crude equation of any criticism of Israel to anti-Semitism which, critics say, is used to silence Israel's detractors."

Izabella Tabarovsky has compared contemporary left-wing antisemitism to Soviet antisemitic campaigns between 1967 and 1988 that said Zionists "complain about antisemitism in order to smear the left", rejecting allegations of antisemitism as "Zionist tricks" and "nefarious imperialist scheming".

In 2021, Yair Wallach wrote: "For the left to overcome this tendency [to overlook internal problems] when it comes to antisemitism requires not only conceptual clarity and ethical consistency but also political determination. The right-wing equation of critiques of Israel with antisemitism makes it perhaps tempting for the left to dismiss all concerns about antisemitism as a smear, and to retreat into pervasive denialism. ... A culture of denialism inevitably creates an environment in which antisemitism is effectively excused and even sanctioned."

In 2026, Jewish Studies scholar Joel Swanson wrote:

The tendency among some progressives to dismiss most antisemitism complaints as presumed to be in bad-faith unless proven otherwise has real costs. When allegations of antisemitism are reflexively treated as a political tactic, it becomes easier to ignore actual antisemitism, even when it's claiming lives and burning down religious buildings.

Becker et al. wrote in 2026 that dismissal of claims of antisemitism as fabricated or weaponized is a common manifestation of antisemitism in Israel–Palestine discourse, and found in an analysis of online audience responses to online commentary on Zohran Mamdani by left-wing personalities, including Hasan Piker, Vaush, Guy Christensen, and Kyle Kulinski, that such dismissals "reliably activate prejudiced audience responses".

In 2018, amid allegations of antisemitism in the UK Labour party, British author Howard Jacobson wrote of a strongly antisemitic atmosphere in the United Kingdom, characterized by an "undisguised assumption, within leftist politics, that when a Jew complains of antisemitism, he is lying", and said that "the charge that Jews cry antisemitism only in order to subvert criticism of Israel or discredit Corbyn ... is the deepest imaginable insult."

The Community Security Trust's 2008 report on antisemitic discourse in Britain says that, despite British Jewish community leaders' statements that Israel is legitimately subject to criticism, "some mainstream media commentators and political activists regularly accuse Jewish representative bodies of manipulating antisemitism as a smear with which to target any criticism of Israel." The report says that British Jewish representatives who raise concerns about antisemitism "are often treated with derision and contempt":

the false accusation [of manipulating antisemitism to smear Israel's critics] is often accompanied by the claim that politicians and journalists are too fearful for their careers and personal safety to speak out against Israel and the alleged Jewish cover-ups on its behalf. This charge is partly reliant upon the antisemitic notion of an all pervasive and all powerful pro-Israeli conspiracy.

Of a 2015 Campaign Against Antisemitism (CAA) poll of British Jews that found that 77% of respondents had "witnessed antisemitism that was disguised as a political comment about Israel", Jonathan Sacerdoti wrote:

Often people are told that it's the other way around—that Jews silence criticism of Israel by invoking antisemitism [... the results show that] there are people who use a legitimate debate about Israel to prevent Jews from speaking out when they feel they have been the victims of antisemitism.

Anthony Julius writes in the "English Antisemitism" chapter of The Routledge History of Antisemitism about the controversy around professor David Miller, who taught that "the Israel lobby ... deceive[s] us with cries of antisemitism when their operations are exposed" and was subsequently protested by Jewish organizations and thusly defended by figures who characterized the criticisms as a smear campaign. Julius characterizes their rhetoric as contending that "Free speech and academic freedom are in jeopardy because of Jewish activity ... Jews shut gentiles up. They claim to be victims, when in truth they are perpetrators; they claim to be heterogeneous and divided, when in truth they are a conspiratorial, single entity (save for a few admirable antizionist Jews ...); they claim to be among the exploited, when in truth they are chief among the exploiters."

In 2021, Harrison and Klaff wrote, "Over the past twenty years, voices from sections of the left sympathetic to the boycotts, divestment, and sanctions (BDS) movement have consistently argued that any and all accusations of antisemitism on their part, even when addressed to quite specific and limited claims concerning Israel, are to be dismissed out of hand as politically disingenuous attempts to silence all criticism of Israel." They call this notion a non sequitur.

==== The Livingstone Formulation ====
Coined in 2005 by antisemitism scholar David Hirsh after an incident involving former mayor of London Ken Livingstone, the "Livingstone Formulation" refers to "responding to an accusation of antisemitism with a counter-accusation of Zionist bad faith". In the namesake incident, Livingstone protested that he was being attacked for his criticism of Israel after he compared a Jewish journalist to "a German war criminal" in a context unrelated to Israel. The term has been applied especially to charges of weaponization of antisemitism from anti-Zionists and the far left, although Hirsh says the formulation "long predates antizionist antisemitism". He gives as examples comments by former Iranian president Mahmoud Ahmadinejad, American white supremacist David Duke, British National Party leader Nick Griffin, and American aviator Charles Lindbergh, along with passages by 19th-century German antisemites Heinrich von Treitschke and Wilhelm Marr.

David Hirsh characterizes the Livingstone Formulation's key elements as follows:

1. "To refuse to discuss the content of the accusation by shifting focus instead onto the hidden motive for the allegation."
2. "To make a counter-accusation that the accuser is not mistaken, has not made an error of judgment, but is getting it wrong on purpose."
3. "To collapse everything – some of which may be demonization of Israel, support for boycott, or antisemitism – into a legitimate category like 'criticism'."
4. "To allege that those who raise the issue of antisemitism are doing so as part of a common secret plan to silence such 'criticism'."

Arnold and Blumenfeld say the Formulation is a key characteristic of discourse related to antisemitism on the American Left. Rensmann calls it a "discursive ideological strategy to immunize antisemitism from antisemitism charges". Samuel Lebens writes that it amounts to epistemic injustice and gaslighting against Jews who complain of antisemitism, and says claims of antisemitism should be treated in good faith, like claims of sexual harassment or racism. Becker writes that the Livingstone Formulation "suggests that the accusation of antisemitism itself is considered more egregious than the possibility of being antisemitic, leading to the dismissal of legitimate concerns about antisemitic attitudes".

=== Israel and anti-Zionism ===
Stephen Rosenfeld wrote in 1982 in response to the notion that criticism of Israel can euphemistically conceal antisemitism:

[Some critics of Israel] now routinely start out by asserting that of course they are going to be smeared as anti-Semites for their remarks [...] These attempts too often sound like a tacit attempt to identify Jews as people whose first loyalty is to a troublesome group outside America.

Rosenfeld wrote that he found this current deeply troubling, even as he condemned attempts to intimidate critics of Israel.

Scholars such as Ben Cohen, Shany Mor, Lars Rensmann, and Efraim Sicher say that anti-Zionist statements and criticism of Israel are sometimes framed as neutral while often relying on traditional antisemitic tropes. Werner Bonefeld says this is more common among those who view antisemitism as "a phenomenon of the past". David Schraub, writing in Fathom, says that the statement "criticism of Israel is not inherently antisemitic", while true, falsely implies that "any non-trivial number of individuals" must believe the opposite, recentering discussions of antisemitism from Jewish victims to the way charges of antisemitism are "allegedly abused to victimise innocent bystanders". David Hirsh agrees, writing, "The contention that criticism of Israel is necessarily anti-Semitic nearly always functions as a straw-man argument." Dershowitz has called the idea that Jews fabricate antisemitism to suppress criticism "a fabrication of Israel's enemies who seek to play the victim card". British sociologist Keith Kahn-Harris called it a "lazy commonplace to dismiss Jewish concerns of antisemitism as the cynical suppression of pro-Palestinian campaigners".

In 2016, Schraub wrote that the presumption "that most anti-Semitism claims related to Israel are leveled in bad faith" is "very common" and itself antisemitic, relying on the belief that Jews are largely either dishonest or delusional. Schraub writes that the ubiquity of this presumption among progressives contrasts with the general unacceptability of similar claims about complaints made by groups such as women and black people. He writes that "most Jews and Jewish organizations" are reluctant to raise claims of antisemitism, since the "default response" to even clear-cut cases of antisemitism "will be to fulminate about oversensitive Jews always playing the anti-Semitism card". Shany Mor wrote of the frequent charge of weaponization in discussions of anti-Zionist antisemitism:

It is a weak defense to rely on the very antisemitism you are supposing try to abjure in order to exculpate oneself from the charge of antisemitism—so weak, in fact, that its repeated use is the best evidence that it represents a deeply held belief.

Derek Spitz, John Hyman, and Anthony Julius have called this a form of victim blaming that places a large burden of proof on Jews. In 2025, Gabriel Sacks wrote, "There is no meaningful way to combat this claim [that Jews weaponize antisemitism to deflect criticism of Israel]: Jews could protest, or merely ignore and not even dare challenge the allegations. Either route has proven to be insufficient for centuries."

Michael S. Broschowitz calls the weaponization charge antisemitism's "most sophisticated defensive evolution", wherein Jewish identification of antisemitism is reframed as a dishonest deployment of victimhood meant to suppress legitimate criticism and "maintain perceived institutional privilege". Broschowitz also writes that deployers of the weaponization charge "may weaponize their own minoritized identities as defensive shields ... [creating] "a perfect defensive inversion: Jews are accused of weaponizing antisemitism while accusers weaponize anti-racism to protect their own antisemitic expression." Broschowitz calls this "weaponization inversion", and writes that it is particularly effective in progressive discourse because it allows Jews to become the "designated repository for colonial shame and white supremacy", allowing progressive actors to "resolve white guilt while maintaining anti-racist legitimacy".

According to Iraqi historian Omar Mohammed, attempts to discuss Islamic antisemitism with Muslims or Arabic speakers are frequently met with accusations of "being pro-Israel or attempting to whitewash Israel’s policies", sometimes in the form of the Livingstone Formulation, with those who raise the issue of antisemitism being accused of being "Westernized" and "attempting to impose a Western problem onto Muslim communities, which purportedly have no connection to hatred against Jews". Mohammed writes that this makes discussions of the matter of Islamic antisemitism in Muslim or Arabic-speaking social contexts difficult and potentially dangerous. Esther Webman wrote in 2010 that Arab leaders have responded to increasing charges of antisemitism "mainly by denial and accusing Israel of using it as a ploy to mute criticism."

Political scientist Gideon Botsch has said that because anti-Zionist antisemitism is often associated with the left and Muslims, the German far-right's claims of weaponization of antisemitism have often been overlooked. Daniel Sugarman of the Board of Deputies of British Jews has said that while the left downplays antisemitism as criticism of Israel, the right often denies or downplays its antisemitism by citing its support for Israel.

Psychologists Miri Halpern and Jaclyn Wolfman say the propagation of the notion that "Jews weaponize antisemitism to stifle criticism of Israel" is an example of traumatic invalidation for Jews since the October 7 attacks. Lili Levi writes that some progressives in the U.S. Democratic party deny that anti-Israel rhetoric can have an antisemitic character, and that those progressives "may ignore the threat of growing antisemitism to American democracy".

Fine and Philip Spencer say that while antisemitism may be weaponized to stifle criticism of Israel in some cases, "the reverse is more plausible: that there are many who cry 'Israel' in order to shut down debate on antisemitism". Bernard Harrison says this "stock" rebuttal attempts to portray complaints of antisemitism as "putatively absurd".

In 2021, religion scholar Atalia Omer said that weaponization of antisemitism is bad for all involved, including Israel and the broader Jewish community. Nick Riemer, a Palestine solidarity activist and linguist, said in 2022 that antisemitism "provides the excuse for a heavy-handed and highly irrational assault on fundamental democratic liberties", comparing it to how "Islamophobia has been politically instrumentalized in the service of neocolonial control of Muslim populations". Miriam F. Elman wrote in 2019 that anti-Israel advocates "refus[ing] to hear" complaints of antisemitism behave similarly when they dismiss criticism of Palestinian policy by "smearing the reputations of those who raise the criticisms" as Islamophobes.

== See also ==
- Anti-Palestinianism
- Nazi analogies
- Nexus Task Force
- Palestine exception
- Playing the victim
- Hurting the feelings of the Chinese people

== Bibliography ==
- Abraham, Matthew (2014). Out of Bounds: Academic Freedom and the Question of Palestine. EBL-Schweitzer. Bloomsbury Publishing. ISBN 978-1-4411-9802-0.
- Adalah; et al. (4 April 2023). "Human Rights and other Civil Society Groups Urge United Nations to Respect Human Rights in the Fight Against Antisemitism". Human Rights Watch.
- Allington, Daniel (1 August 2018). "'Hitler had a valid argument against some Jews': Repertoires for the denial of antisemitism in Facebook discussion of a survey of attitudes to Jews and Israel". Discourse, Context & Media. 24: 129–136. doi:10.1016/j.dcm.2018.03.004. hdl:2381/41960. ISSN 2211-6958.
- Amor, Meir; et al. (3 November 2022). "Scholars to UN: Don't adopt 'weaponised' antisemitism definition" (PDF). EUobserver.
- Arnold, S.; Blumenfeld, J. (2022). From Occupation to Occupy: Antisemitism and the Contemporary American Left. Studies in Antisemitism. Indiana University Press. ISBN 978-0-253-06314-4.
- Ball, George W.; Ball, D.B. (1992). The Passionate Attachment: America's Involvement with Israel, 1947 to the Present. W.W. Norton. ISBN 978-0-393-02933-8.
- Beinin, Joel (2004). "The New American McCarthyism: Policing Thought about the Middle East". Race & Class. 46 (1): 101–115. doi:10.1177/0306396804045517. ISSN 0306-3968. S2CID 143636285.
- Chomsky, Noam (1983). The Fateful Triangle: The United States, Israel, and the Palestinians. Politics/Mideast. South End Press. ISBN 978-0-89608-187-1.
- Chomsky, Noam (1989). Necessary Illusions. Pluto Press. ISBN 978-0-7453-0380-2.
- Chomsky, Noam (2002). "Anti-Semitism, Zionism, and the Palestinians" (PDF). Variant. 2 (16).
- Feldman, D.; Volovici, M. (2023). Antisemitism, Islamophobia and the Politics of Definition. Palgrave Critical Studies of Antisemitism and Racism. Springer International Publishing. ISBN 978-3-031-16266-4.
- Finlay, W. M. L. (2005). "Pathologizing dissent: Identity politics, Zionism and the self-hating Jew". British Journal of Social Psychology. 44 (2): 201–222. doi:10.1348/014466604X17894. ISSN 0144-6665. PMID 16004646.
- Finkelstein, Norman G. (2008). Beyond Chutzpah: On the Misuse of Anti-Semitism and the Abuse of History. Berkeley, CA: University of California Press. ISBN 978-0-520-24989-9.
- Goodman, Simon (2025). "Managing Jewish Identity in Arguments Over Jewish Support for Palestine". Journal of Community & Applied Social Psychology. 35 (1) e70039. doi:10.1002/casp.70039. ISSN 1052-9284.
- Hirsh, David (2007). Anti-Zionism and Antisemitism: Cosmopolitan Reflections. Yale Initiative for the Interdisciplinary Study of Antisemitism. ISBN 978-0-9819058-0-8.
- Hirsh, David (2010). "Accusations of malicious intent in debates about the Palestine-Israel conflict and about antisemitism The Livingstone Formulation, 'playing the antisemitism card' and contesting the boundaries of antiracist discourse". Transversal. 11: 44–77.
- Hirsh, David (2013). "Struggles over the Boundaries of Legitimate Discourse: Antizionism, Bad-Faith Allegations and The Livingstone Formulation". In Small, Charles Asher (ed.). Global Antisemitism: A Crisis of Modernity. Vol. V: Reflections. Institute for the Study of Global Antisemitism and Policy.
- Hirsh, David (2018). Contemporary left antisemitism. London; New York: Routledge Taylor & Francis Group. ISBN 978-1-138-23530-4.
- Hirsh, David (30 October 2020). "The 'Livingstone formula' is dead". www.thejc.com.
- Hirsh, David (2021). "Fathom Long Read | The Meaning of David Miller". Fathom.
- Hirsh, David (2024). "It was the new phenomenon of Israel-focused antisemitism that required the new definition. David Hirsh responds to a recent 'call to reject' the IHRA". Fathom.
- Landy, David; Lentin, Ronit; McCarthy, Conor (15 May 2020). Enforcing Silence: Academic Freedom, Palestine and the Criticism of Israel. Zed Books Ltd. ISBN 978-1-78699-653-4.
- Lerman, A. (2022). Whatever Happened to Antisemitism?: Redefinition and the Myth of the 'collective Jew'. Pluto Press. ISBN 978-0-7453-3877-4.
- Marcus, Kenneth L. (2010). "Anti-Semitism Denial and Minimisation". Jewish Identity and Civil Rights in America. Cambridge University Press. pp. 67–69. ISBN 978-1-139-49119-8.
- Mearsheimer, John; Walt, Stephen (2008). "The Great Silencer". The Israel Lobby and U.S. Foreign Policy. Penguin Books Limited. pp. 191–196. ISBN 978-0-14-192066-5.
- Melki, J. (2024). Media Literacy of the Oppressed: An Emancipatory Pedagogy for/with the Marginalized. Routledge Research in Media Literacy and Education. Taylor & Francis. ISBN 978-1-04-015755-8.
- Plitnick, Mitchell; Aziz, Sahar F. (23 November 2023). Presumptively Antisemitic: Islamophobic Tropes in the Palestine Israel Discourse (PDF). Rutgers University Law School Center for Security, Race, and Rights.
- Quigley, John (2021). The Legality of a Jewish State: A Century of Debate over Rights in Palestine. Cambridge University Press. ISBN 978-1-316-51924-0.
- Rensmann, Lars (2019). "The Peculiar Appeal of the "Jewish Question": The Case of Left Antisemitism". Antisemitism Studies. 3 (2): 343–371. doi:10.2979/antistud.3.2.07. ISSN 2474-1817.
- Riemer, Nick (2022). Boycott Theory and the Struggle for Palestine: Universities, Intellectualism and Liberation. Off the Fence: Morality, Politics and Society. Rowman & Littlefield Publishers. ISBN 978-1-5381-7588-0.
- Robins, Walker (2022). ""Weizmann to her was God": Dorothy Thompson's Journey to and from Zionism". American Jewish History. 106 (1): 55–80. doi:10.1353/ajh.2022.0003. ISSN 1086-3141.
- Rubenberg, Cheryl (1989). Israel and the American National Interest: A Critical Examination. University of Illinois Press. ISBN 978-0-252-06074-8.
- Schraub, David (2016). "Playing with Cards: Discrimination Claims and the Charge of Bad Faith". Social Theory and Practice. 42 (2): 285–303. doi:10.5840/soctheorpract201642216. ISSN 0037-802X. JSTOR 24871344.
- Schirch, Lisa (2025). "Winning Coexistence: Six New Nonviolent Tactics for Palestine and Israel". Toda Peace Institute.
- Segal, Raz (15 August 2024a). "Settler Antisemitism, Israeli Mass Violence, and the Crisis of Holocaust and Genocide Studies". Journal of Palestine Studies. 53 (2): 50–73. doi:10.1080/0377919X.2024.2384385.
- Segal, Raz (14 May 2024b). "How Weaponizing Antisemitism Puts Jews at Risk". TIME.
- Steinberg, Bernie (29 December 2023). "For the Safety of Jews and Palestinians, Stop Weaponizing Antisemitism". The Harvard Crimson.
- Stonebridge, Lyndsey (2017). "Humanitarianism Was Never Enough: Dorothy Thompson, Sands of Sorrow, and the Arabs of Palestine". Humanity. 8 (3): 441–465. doi:10.1353/hum.2017.0027. ISSN 2151-4372. S2CID 152073268.
- Thompson, Jon (2012). No Debate: The Israel Lobby and Free Speech at Canadian Universities. Canadian Association of University Teachers. Lorimer. ISBN 978-1-55277-657-5.
- Ury, S.; Miron, G.; Miron, G. (2023). Antisemitism and the Politics of History. The Tauber Institute Series for the Study of European Jewry. Brandeis University Press. ISBN 978-1-68458-180-1.
- Waxman, Dov; Schraub, David; Hosein, Adam (4 July 2022). "Arguing about antisemitism: why we disagree about antisemitism, and what we can do about it". Ethnic and Racial Studies. 45 (9): 1803–1824. doi:10.1080/01419870.2021.1960407. ISSN 0141-9870. S2CID 238721730.
- Wecker, Menachem (1 May 2007). "In Defense of 'Self-Hating' Jews". Jewish Currents.
- White, Ben (1 February 2020). "Delegitimizing Solidarity: Israel Smears Palestine Advocacy as Anti-Semitic" (PDF). Journal of Palestine Studies. 49 (2): 65–79. doi:10.1525/jps.2020.49.2.65. ISSN 0377-919X. S2CID 218853797.
