= Masada (disambiguation) =

Masada is an ancient fortification in the Southern District of Israel.

Masada or Massada may also refer to:

- Siege of Masada, a famous siege and mass suicide at the fortress
- Masada myth, the early Zionist retelling of the story

== Places ==
- Masada (kibbutz), a kibbutz near the Sea of Galilee, Israel
- Mas'ade, a Druze village in the Golan Heights

== Arts and entertainment ==
- Masada (comics), a superheroine in Youngblood
- Masada (miniseries) (1981), an American television miniseries

=== Music ===
- Masada (band), a jazz quartet fronted by avant-garde composer John Zorn
- Masada 967, an opera by Israeli composer Josef Tal
- Masada (album), by Alpha Blondy (1992)
- Masada, a 1997 composition by Ralph Hultgren

== Organizations ==
- Masada Action and Defense Movement, a false flag terrorist organisation in France established by white supremacists
- Masada College, a Jewish primary and secondary school in St Ives, New South Wales, Australia

== People ==
- Masada (wrestler) (born 1981), American professional wrestler
- Masada Iosefa (1988–2021), Samoan professional rugby league player
- Jamie Masada (born 1954), Iranian-born American businessman and comedian
- Kazuhiko Masada (born 1975), Japanese professional wrestler
- Takeshi Masada (born 2001), Japanese professional wrestler

== Military ==
- IWI Masada, an Israeli semi-automatic pistol
- Masada (rifle), the original name of the Remington ACR rifle designed by Magpul

== See also ==
- Masada2000, a radical-Zionist website
