= Livingstone Formulation =

Responding to antisemitism with a claim of bad faith

The Livingstone Formulation is the manner of responding to an accusation of antisemitism with the counter-claim that the complainant is weaponizing antisemitism to suppress criticism of Israel. The term was invented by British sociologist David Hirsh after an incident involving former London mayor Ken Livingstone. The Livingstone Formulation has been described as a common retort to allegations of antisemitism, particularly on the political left, and has been criticized as dishonest and propagating antisemitic stereotypes about Jewish power and deceit.

== Definition ==
In 2005, sociologist David Hirsh coined the term "the Livingstone Formulation" for "responding to an accusation of antisemitism with a counter-accusation of Zionist bad faith". The concept is named for former London mayor Ken Livingstone, who wrote in an op-ed for The Guardian in March 2006 after he was called antisemitic for saying a Jewish journalist behaved like "a German war criminal":

Some time before this incident was blown up out of all proportion, the Board of Deputies asked to meet me to urge me to tone down my views on the Israeli government. For far too long the accusation of anti-semitism has been used against anyone who is critical of the policies of the Israeli government, as I have been.

David Hirsh characterizes the Livingstone Formulation's key elements as follows:

1. "To refuse to discuss the content of the accusation by shifting focus instead onto the hidden motive for the allegation."
2. "To make a counter-accusation that the accuser is not mistaken, has not made an error of judgment, but is getting it wrong on purpose."
3. "To collapse everything – some of which may be demonization of Israel, support for boycott, or antisemitism – into a legitimate category like 'criticism'."
4. "To allege that those who raise the issue of antisemitism are doing so as part of a common secret plan to silence such 'criticism'."

Hirsh gives as examples of the Livingstone Formulation: former President of Iran Mahmoud Ahmadinejad, who responded to criticism of his Holocaust denial by complaining that "As soon as anyone objects to the behaviour of the Zionist regime, they’re accused of being anti-Semitic"; American white supremacist David Duke; British National Party leader Nick Griffin; and American aviator Charles Lindbergh.

== History ==
Hirsh wrote in 2021 that "rhetoric resembling the Livingstone Formulation ... long pre-dates antizionist antisemitism," identifying passages from 19th-century German antisemites Heinrich von Treitschke and Wilhelm Marr that complained of "concocted allegation[s] of bigotry" against reasonable critics of "the undeniable weaknesses of the Jewish character". John Hyman and Anthony Julius connect "the 'Antisemitism as smear' trope" to the "established antisemitic defamation" that Jews are dishonest, as polemicized by Martin Luther in On The Jews and Their Lies (1543) and Heinrich von Treitschke's declaration that "Jews stand for 'Lug und Trug' [lying and cheating]."

Efraim Sicher and Linda Weinhouse state that the Livingstone Formulation's history goes back to The Protocols of the Elders of Zion, which accused Jews of "inventing or being the cause of antisemitism". Ben Cohen said Henry Ford used an early example of the "discursive technique" when he complained in 1921 of the "degrading charge of 'anti-semitism' and kindred falsehoods".

Hirsh also highlights the 1952 "confession"—extracted under torture—from Rudolf Slánský, former General Secretary of the Communist Party of Czechoslovakia, of "shield[ing] Zionism" by accusing its critics of antisemitism as a deployment of the Livingstone Formulation characteristic of Soviet antisemitism. Izabella Tabarovsky makes a comparison between contemporary left-wing antisemitism and Soviet antisemitic campaigns that sought to accuse Zionists of "complain[ing] about antisemitism in order to smear the left" between 1967 and 1988. Anna Zawadzka writes that the formulation was already in use in Poland in 1968, such that Jews "could not articulate their experiences of antisemitism" without having their articulations "diagnosed as either cynical victim-playing or an emotional disorder." She interprets this response as a form of "paternalistic violence", taking the Polish Jews to be deserving of sympathy, but not of trust in their view of antisemitism, because of the trauma of the Holocaust. Zawadzka writes that this view has changed today, with Jews now being taken as cynical and manipulative in their articulations of antisemitism rather than as traumatized and paranoid.

== Responses ==
Lars Rensmann describes the Formulation as a "discursive ideological strategy to immunize antisemitism from antisemitism charges". Daniel Sugarman of the Board of Deputies of British Jews said the Livingstone Formulation was an "almost Pavlovian reaction". Sugarman and others, such as Ernest Sternberg, have said the Livingstone Formulation is particularly common on the far left. Lesley Klaff, speaking of British politics (particularly on discourses involving Holocaust inversion), says the Livingstone Formulation amounts to a "denial of contemporary antisemitism commonplace in Britain".

Daniel Ian Rubin and Mara Grayson wrote that the University of California, Santa Cruz Critical Race and Ethnic Studies department's statement following the October 7 attacks did not condemn the attacks but instead condemned supposed "underhanded efforts" by Jewish nonprofits to "smear" the department's Institute for the Critical Study of Zionism as antisemitic. Rubin and Grayson analyzed the statement as pre-emptively deflecting accusations of antisemitism by "declaring that any such accusation is strategically designed and unscrupulously deployed to silence criticism of Israel", thus reinforcing antisemitic tropes about conspiracy and Jewish dishonesty.

Sina Arnold and Jacob Blumenfeld identify use of the Livingstone Formulation as a key characteristic of discourse related to antisemitism on the US Left. Jewish Voice for Peace (JVP) has been criticized by Neil J. Kressel and Miriam F. Elman for deployment of the Livingstone Formulation, with Elfman writing that JVP "works on the American campus to discredit concerns about antisemitism, casting them instead as a deceitful effort to censor legitimate discourse and debate about Israel," enabling the dismissal of concerns about antisemitism on American college campuses.

== See also ==
- Anti-antisemitism
- New antisemitism
- Nexus Task Force
- Three Ds of antisemitism
