= Sahar Aziz =

American academic and lawyer

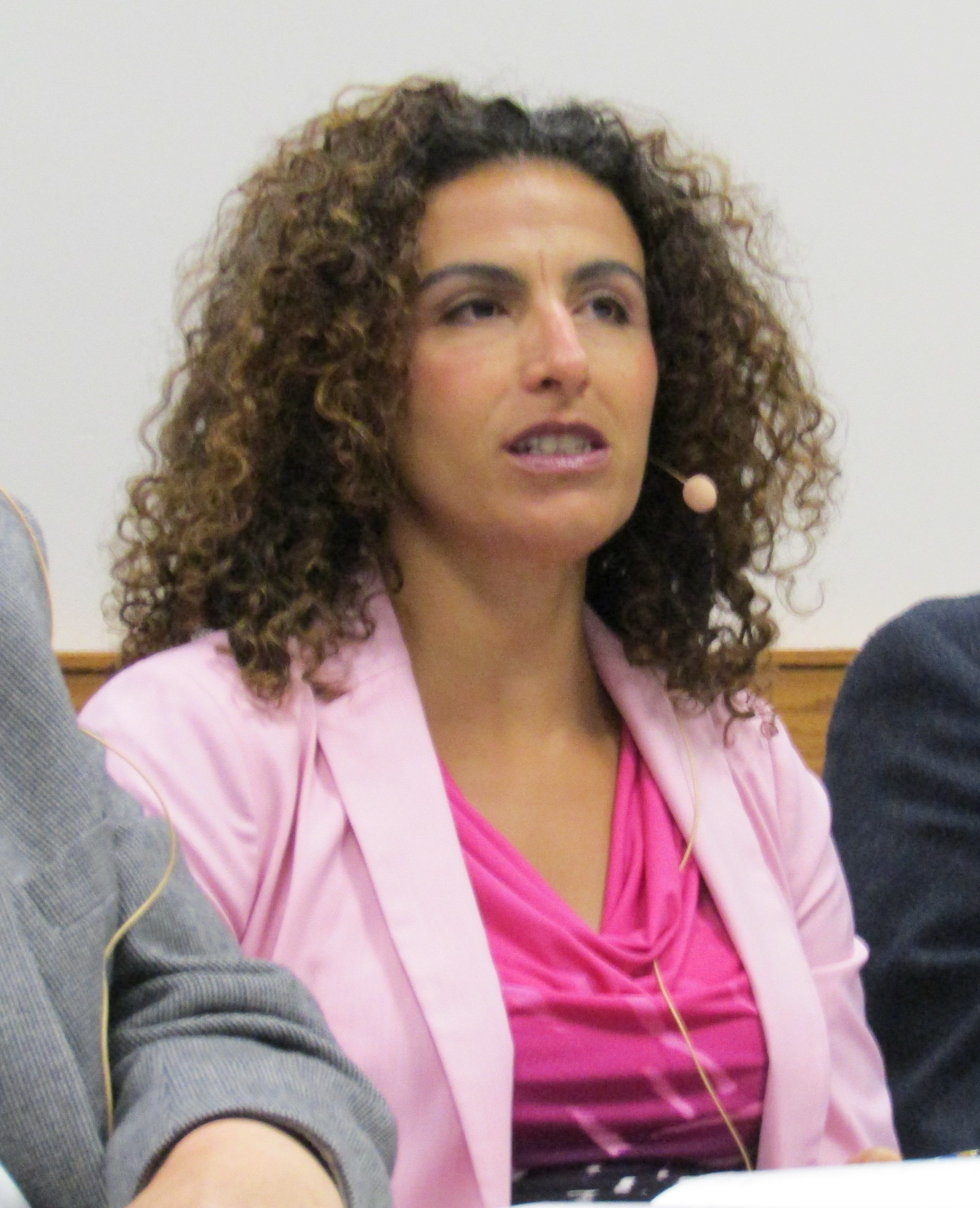
- Sahar Aziz
- Born: Sahar F. Aziz; 1974 or 1975 (age 51–52); Cairo, Egypt
- Education: University of Texas
- Occupation: Distinguished Professor of Law
- Website: saharazizlaw.com

Sahar F. Aziz is a professor of law and Chancellor’s Social Justice Scholar at Rutgers Law School. She is the founding director of the Center for Security, Race and Rights. Her book The Racial Muslim: When Racism Quashes Religious Freedom explains why Muslims experience discrimination that mirrors racism against racial minorities rather than religious freedom.

Aziz argued that following the 9/11 attacks, the Muslim community living in the U.S. was deprived of full legal protection and of the full benefit of their civil rights.

== Biography ==
Sahar F. Aziz was born in Cairo, Egypt and raised in the U.S. Aziz studied Middle East Studies at the University of Texas. She worked as clerk at the District Court of Maryland for Judge Andre M. Davis. Aziz also worked for private law firms as a litigation associate and at the United States Department of Homeland Security Office for Civil Rights and Civil Liberties before becoming a full time professor.

== Denouncing Islamophobia in the Global North ==
Aziz believes that in the Western world, Muslims as a group are assigned negative traits such as being violent and untrustworthy. Aziz described this attribution of negative traits to Muslims as a process of racialization, which took place in the U.S. after 9/11 terrorist attacks. One manifestation is that immigrants to the U.S. originally from Middle East and North Africa are perceived as forever foreign, according to Aziz. In the U.S., Aziz pointed out that the presidency of Donald Trump led to a backsliding of the rights of the Muslim community and to discrimination, such as for example bullying of Muslim children at schools.

In Europe, the situation of the Muslim community is worse in comparative terms according to Aziz because fewer people practice religion in Europe compared to the U.S. Therefore pointing to religion as an excuse for unwelcome behaviour is less available to Muslims, because it is less central to the European legal tradition to start with.

== Published works ==
- Aziz, Sahar (2021). The Racial Muslim: When Racism Quashes Religious Freedom. UC Press. ISBN 9780520382299.
- Aziz, Sahar (ed.) and Esposito, John (ed.) (2024). Global Islamophobia and the Rise of Populism. Oxford Press. ISBN 9780197648995
