= Masada2000 =

California-based pro-Israeli, Kahanist political website

- Website type: Political
- Website: www.masada2000.org

Masada2000 was a California-based website created and maintained by people from the United States, Israel, Brazil, and Switzerland. It has been described as "extreme pro-Israel, anti-Palestinian" and "radical-Zionist". The site supported and often quoted the views of Meir Kahane, although it had denied being Kahanist. Before 2001 the site was called Zion2000.

== History ==
The site was named after the Masada fortress in Israel, where, during Jewish Revolt against the Roman Empire, a group known as the Sicarii fought the Romans and committed mass suicide rather than surrender. According to its founders, it was established to counter "professional and deadly serious" websites with anti-Israel views. They also have said that the site would "expose Jews who genuinely despise Israel and the Jewishness it represents" and "'progressive' Jews who are into 'social justice' causes for everyone EXCEPT Israel's Jewish population."

The site referred to Arab citizens of Israel and Palestinians as "cancer" and endorses their expulsion from Israel and the Occupied Territories to "Arab nations."

Masada2000 was well known for its criticism of Jews it considered "self-hating." Among those singled out were Rabbi Michael Lerner, linguist Noam Chomsky, journalist Amira Hass, politician Dedi Zucker, professor Israel Shahak, and filmmaker Woody Allen.

The site was also notorious for its "Self-Hating and/or Israel-Threatening" list, known as the "S.H.I.T. List." (From time to time, the S.H.I.T. List had been renamed. For a while it was the "Dense anti-Israel Repugnant Traitors" LIST, or "D.I.R.T. List." Then it became the "Self-Hating and/or Intentionally Israel-Threatening Ediots LIST" or "S.H.I.I.T.E. List.") More than 7,000 names long, the list consisted of Jews whose opinions fall to the left of those of Masada2000's creators. The site described its targets as "radical, leftist, academic, socialist, 'progressive,' enlightened know-nothings [who] are not even worthy of the name 'Jew.'" People on the list were often described using profanities, vulgar insults, racial epithets, and portrayed with photographs of animals. In some cases, their email addresses, telephone numbers, home addresses, and other private contact information were included as well.

Appearing on Masada2000's "S.H.I.T. LIST" has provoked a wide range of reaction. Francesca Yardenit Albertini, Jewish philosophy professor at Hochschule für Jüdische Studien (College of Jewish Studies) in Germany, expressed concern, saying "I can have my career negatively affected by such defamation." Stanley Aronowitz, a sociology professor, said he was "proud to be on the Masada2000 list." Yigal Bronner, an Israeli-born Professor of Sanskrit Literature at the University of Chicago, comments that, in its focus on Jews, the list is "antisemitism itself, the real shit... undisguised and unambiguous hatred for Jews."

Being included on the "S.H.I.T. LIST" has become something of a badge of honor among some Jewish leftists. As one woman explained, "I felt that I am in good company when I saw who else was on the list." According to one writer, "activists compare their status, those who are left out wondering whether they should submit themselves."

The website itself has been inactive since 2007, but other sites and pages assuming the name have since taken its place, including a Masada2000 Facebook page.

== See also ==
- Neo-Zionism
