= Wilhelm Marr =

German journalist who popularized the term antisemitism (1819–1904)

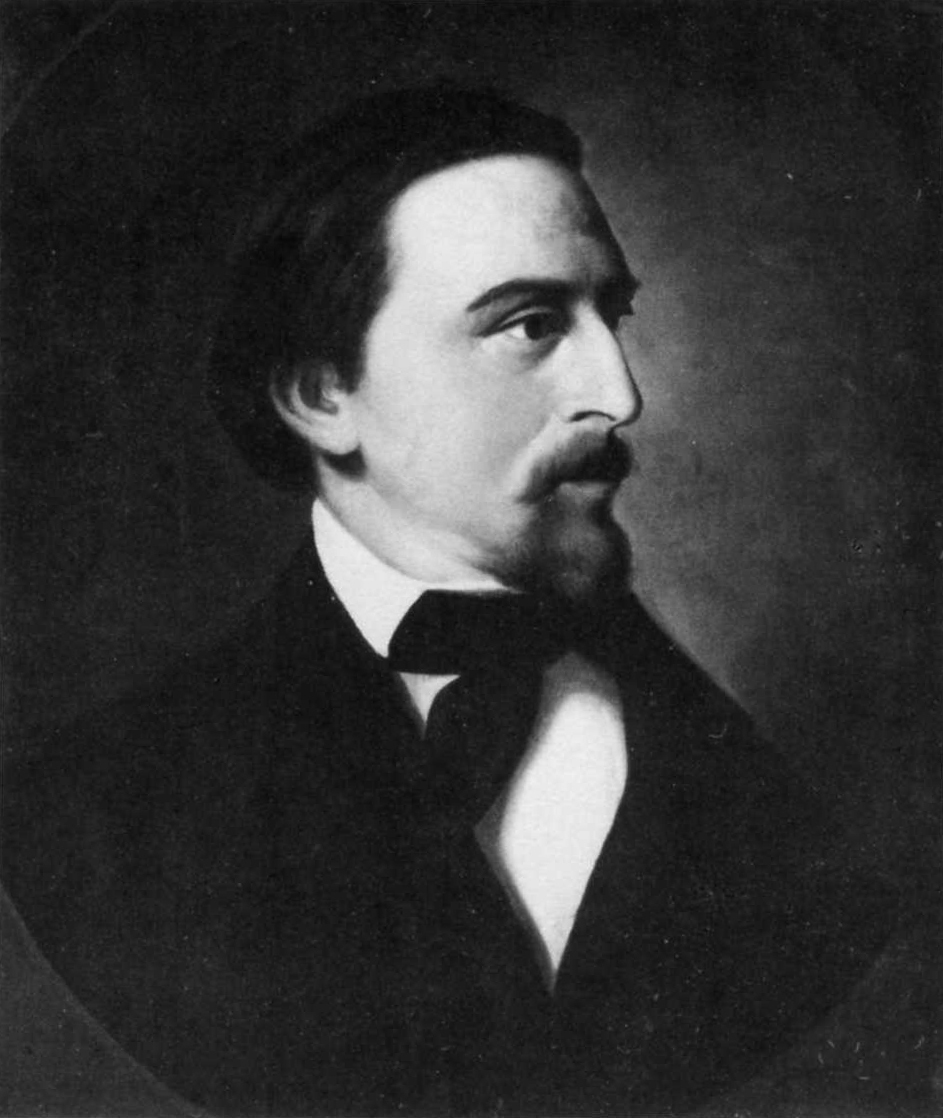
Wilhelm Marr

Friedrich Wilhelm Adolph Marr (November 16, 1819 – July 17, 1904) was a German journalist and politician, who popularized the term "antisemitism" (1881).

== Early life and education ==
Marr was born in Magdeburg in 1819 as the only son of an actor and stage director. He went to a primary school in Hanover, then to a high school in Braunschweig. In Hamburg and Bremen, he was an apprentice in commerce, then he joined his father in Vienna, who had been engaged by the Burgtheater. There he worked as an employee in two Jewish firms. Later, Marr stated that he had unjustly lost his job.

== Career ==
In 1841, he went to Zürich, where he became acquainted with political émigrés (like Georg Herwegh, Julius Fröbel, and August Follen), most of whom were members of the democratic or liberal leftist movements of the early 19th century.

In 1843, Marr was expelled from Zürich under the accusation that he had furthered communist activities. He turned to Lausanne, where he joined Hermann Döleke and Julius Standau, the founders of the secret Léman-Bund, which belonged to the "Junges Deutschland " (Young German Movement). Marr eventually became the head of the secret society and began to lean towards anarchism and atheism, founded another secret society, the "Schweizerischer Arbeiterbund" (Swiss Worker's Union) and edited the "Blätter der Gegenwart für soziales Leben" (Present-Day Papers for Social Life, 1844/45).

In 1845 he was expelled from Lausanne, too, and went to Hamburg. There he became a political journalist and published the satirical magazine Mephistopheles (1847/48–1852). He belonged to the leftists of the radical-democratic "party" and was a delegate to the National Assembly in Frankfurt after the March-Revolution of 1848. After the ultimate failure of the revolution he became, like so many other former revolutionaries, a proponent of the idea of German unification under Prussian leadership.

In 1852, Marr went abroad, to Costa Rica, where he tried to make a living as a businessman. He traveled to the United States, where he encountered racial segregation on a streetcar in New York. In his memoirs, he describes himself as having his sense of social injustice inflamed, and at first he purposefully breached the color barrier while crying socialist slogans, then suddenly felt an olfactory disgust response and hopped off the streetcar. Traveling to Nicaragua, his sense of racial disgust and white supremacy seems to have heightened further. In his retrospective memoir, he describes Afro-Nicaraguans as "one third tiger, one third monkey and the last third pig" taking on "deformed human shape." Failing to obtain success in any of these countries, he returned to Hamburg, worked again as a journalist, and in 1854 he married Georgine Johanna Bertha Callenbach, daughter of a Jewish businessman who had renounced his faith.

In 1859, Marr was elected member of the Hamburg Parliament. In an article, in the Courier an der Weser on 13 June 1862, he attacked the elected liberal speaker of the house, the Jewish lawyer Isaac Wolffson, accusing him and other Jews of betraying the democratic movement and abusing their emancipation in order to enter the city's merchant class. After extensive public protests, Marr was not reelected in 1862.

== Antisemitism ==
Marr's speeches and articles showed first indications of antisemitism in 1848. He was influenced by the Burschenschaft movement of the early nineteenth century; the movement developed among German students frustrated with the failure of the Congress of Vienna to create a unified state out of all the territories inhabited by the German people. The Burschenschaft rejected the participation of Jewish and other non-German minorities as members, "unless they prove that they are anxious to develop within themselves a Christian-German spirit" (a decision of the "Burschenschaft Congress of 1818"). While they were opposed to the participation of Jews in their movement, similarly to Heinrich von Treitschke later, they did allow the possibility of the Jewish (and other) minorities to participate in the German state if they were to abandon all signs of ethnic and religious distinctiveness and assimilate into the German Volk.

However, upon his return to Germany from the Americas, Marr developed a rhetoric that moved away from objections to customs or beliefs and towards American-style color barriers. In 1859, he referred to Black Americans as "closer to beasts than to human beings," and started to use similar rhetoric against Jews. He rejected older anti-Jewish arguments that criticized their religion, now proposing that the problem with Jews was not their religious beliefs or culture, but their subhuman genetics.

=== League of antisemites ===
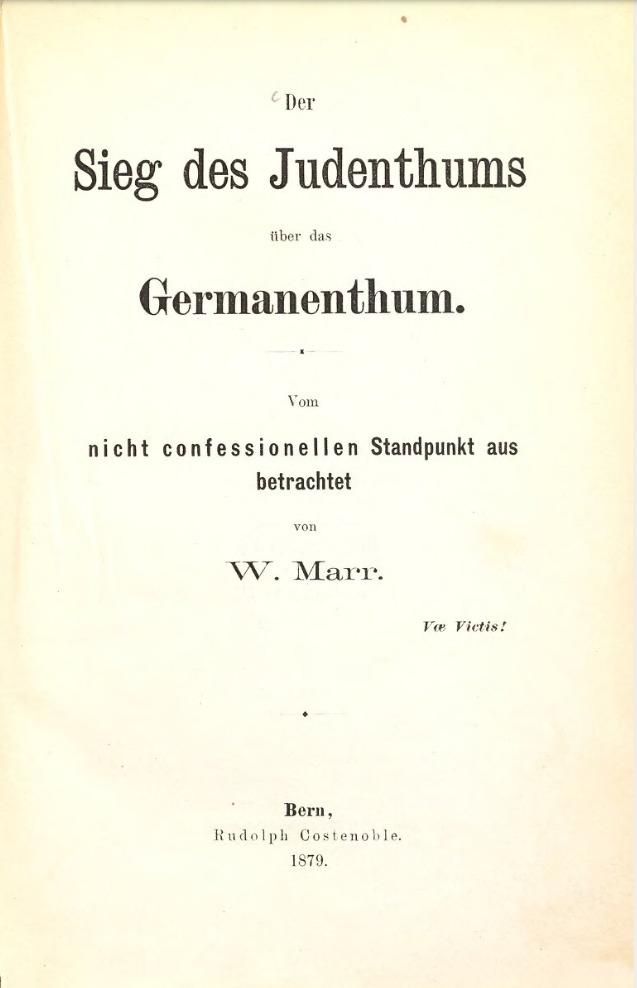
Cover page of Der Sieg des Judenthums über das Germanenthum (1879)

Marr rejected the premise of assimilation as a means for Jews to become Germans. In his pamphlet Der Sieg des Judenthums über das Germanenthum (The Victory of Judaism over Germandom, 1879) he introduced the idea that Germans and Jews were locked in a longstanding conflict, the origins of which he attributed to race—and that the Jews were winning. He argued that Jewish emancipation resulting from German liberalism had allowed the Jews to control German finance and industry. Furthermore, since this conflict was based on the different qualities of the Jewish and German races, it could not be resolved even by the total assimilation of the Jewish population.

According to Marr, the struggle between Jews and Germans would only be resolved by the victory of one and the ultimate death of the other. A Jewish victory, he concluded, would result in finis Germaniae (the end of the German people). To prevent this from happening, in 1879 Marr founded the League of Antisemites (Antisemiten-Liga), the first German organization committed specifically to combating the alleged threat to Germany posed by the Jews and advocating their forced removal from the country.

The Pan-German League, founded in 1891, originally allowed for the membership of Jews, provided they were fully assimilated into German culture. It was only in 1912, eight years after Marr's death, that the League declared racism as an underlying principle. Nevertheless, Marr was a major link in the evolving chain of German racism that erupted into genocide during the Nazi era.

According to Moshe Zimmermann in Wilhelm Marr: The Patriarch of Anti-Semitism, a book written 100 years after the fact, toward the end of his life Marr came to renounce antisemitism, arguing that social upheaval in Germany had been the result of the Industrial Revolution and conflict between political movements. This book was never published by Marr, only as text cited by Zimmermann.

== Personal life and death ==
In 1854 Marr married Georgine Johanna Bertha Callenbach, daughter of a Jewish businessman who had renounced his faith. They were divorced in 1873. Marr's first marriage was an unhappy one, and despite being financially stable, Marr was in emotional distress. In 1874, Marr married a Jewish woman, Helene Sophia Emma Maria Behrend, who died within the same year. Marr's second marriage was a happy one, but then his wife and child died within days of each other, which left Marr in great distress and bitter towards the world. In 1875, there was a third marriage, to Jenny Therese Kornick whose parents lived in a Christian-Jewish mixed marriage, who bore him a son. In 1877, this marriage was ended in divorce too; Marr's last wife was Clara Maria Kelch, daughter of a Hamburg working man.

Marr died on July 17, 1904.

== Works ==
- Pillen. Eigens präpariert für deutsche und andere Michel, 1844
- Katechismus eines Republikaners der Zukunft, 1845
- Das junge Deutschland in der Schweiz. Ein Beitrag zur Geschichte der geheimen Verbindungen unserer Tage, 1846
- Anarchie oder Autorität?, 1852
- Reise durch Central-Amerika, 1852
- Messias Lassalle und seine Hamburger Jünger. Eine Abfertigung, 1863
- Der Ausschluß Oesterreichs aus Deutschland ist eine politische Widersinnigkeit, 1866
- Selbständigkeit und Hoheitsrecht der freien Stadt Hamburg sind ein Anachronismus geworden, 1866
- Des Weltunterganges Posaunenstoß, lieblich begleitet und allen Gläubigen gewidment, 1867
- Es muß alles Soldat werden! oder die Zukunft des Norddeutschen Bundes. Ein Phantasiegemälde, 1867
- Nach Jerusalem mit dem Papst. Eine Bergpredigt, 1867
- Religiöse Streifzüge eines philosophischen Touristen, 1876
- Der Sieg des Judenthums über das Germanenthum – Vom nichtconfessionellen Standpunkt aus betrachtet. Bern: Rudolph Costenoble, 1879. - English translation: Rohringer, Gerhard. Victory of Judaism over Germanism - Considered from a Nonreligious Perspective. 2009
- Jeiteles teutonicus. Harfenklänge aus dem vermauschelten Deutschland von Marr dem Zweiten, 1879
- Vom jüdischen Kriegsschauplatz. Eine Streitschrift, 1879
- Das Salomonische Spruchbuch, 1879
- Wählet keinen Juden! Der Weg zum Siege des Germanenthums über das Judenthum. Ein Mahnwort an die Wähler nichtjüdischen Stammes aller Confessionen. Berlin: Hentze, 1880
- Der Judenkrieg, seine Fehler und wie er zu organisieren ist. 2. Theil von ""Der Sieg des Judenthums über das Germanenthum", 1880
- Goldene Ratten und rothe Mäuse, 1880
- Oeffnet die Augen, Ihr deutschen Zeitungsleser. Ein unentbehrliches Büchlein für jeden deutschen Zeitungsleser, 1880
- Lessing contra Sem. Allen "Rabbinern" der Juden- und Christenheit, allen Toleranz-Duselheimern aller Parteien, allen Pharisäern und "Schriftgelehrten" tolerantest gewidmet, 1885

== See also ==
- New antisemitism
- History of antisemitism

== Sources ==
- Zimmermann, Moshe (1986). Wilhelm Marr, the Patriarch of Antisemitism. New York and Oxford: Oxford University Press. ISBN 978-0-19-504005-0.
- Bruns, Claudia (2011). "Toward a Transnational History of Racism: Wilhelm Marr and the Interrelationships between Colonial Racism and German Anti-Semitism". Racism in the Modern World. pp. 122–139. doi:10.1515/9780857450777-007. ISBN 978-0-85745-077-7.
