= IHRA definition of antisemitism =

IHRA-approved statement on antisemitism

The IHRA definition of antisemitism is a "non-legally binding working" (Note: When published, it was neither intended nor mandated that it should replace domestic law among IHRA member states.) definition of antisemitism that was adopted by the International Holocaust Remembrance Alliance (IHRA) in 2016. It is also known as the IHRA working definition of antisemitism (IHRA-WDA). Accompanying the working definition are 11 illustrative examples, seven of which relate to criticism of Israel, that the IHRA describes as guiding its work on antisemitism.

The definition was first published in 2005 by the European Monitoring Centre on Racism and Xenophobia (EUMC), a European Union agency, and was known as the EUMC definition or EUMC working definition, and was developed during 2003–2004, and was published without formal review by the EUMC on 28 January 2005. The EUMC's successor agency, the Fundamental Rights Agency (FRA), removed the working definition from its website in "a clear-out of non-official documents" in November 2013. On 26 May 2016, the working definition was adopted by the IHRA Plenary (consisting of representatives from 31 countries) in Bucharest, Romania, and was republished on the IHRA website. It was subsequently adopted by the European Parliament and other national and international bodies, although not all have explicitly included the illustrative examples. Pro-Israel organizations have been advocates for the worldwide legal adoption of the IHRA working definition.

The definition has been criticised by academics, including legal scholars, for equating antisemitism with the criticism of Israeli actions and policies. The examples relating to Israel have been criticised by academics, including legal scholars, for being open to weaponization of antisemitism used to stifle free speech relating to criticism of Israeli actions and policies. High-profile controversies took place in the United Kingdom in 2011 within the University and College Union, and within the Labour Party in 2018. Critics say weaknesses in the working definition may lend themselves to abuse, that it may obstruct campaigning for the rights of Palestinians (as in the Palestine exception), and that it is too vague. (Note: "The weaknesses of the 'Working Definition' are the gateway to its political instrumentalization, for instance for morally discrediting opposing positions in the Arab-Israeli conflict with the accusation of antisemitism. This has relevant implications for fundamental rights. The increasing implementation of the 'Working Definition' as a quasi-legal basis for administrative action promises regulatory potential. In fact, it is instead an instrument that all but invites arbitrariness. It can be used to abridge fundamental rights particularly freedom of speech with respect to disfavoured positions on Israel. In contrast to what the designation 'Working Definition' suggests, no further development of the definition to rectify these weaknesses is occurring.") Kenneth S. Stern, who contributed to the original draft, has opposed the weaponization of the definition on college campuses in ways that might undermine free speech. (Note: "What started as an honest attempt to tackle growing antisemitism quickly became weaponized by definitional warriors, among them the Zionist Organization of America (ZOA), the American Jewish Committee (AJC), and the Brandeis Center, all of whom have lobbied institutions and governments to adopt it.") The controversy over the definition led to the creation of the Jerusalem Declaration on Antisemitism and the Nexus Document, both of which expressly draw distinctions between antisemitism and criticism of Israel.

== Text ==
=== Definition ===
The working definition reads:

Antisemitism is a certain perception of Jews, which may be expressed as hatred toward Jews. Rhetorical and physical manifestations of antisemitism are directed toward Jewish or non-Jewish individuals and/or their property, toward Jewish community institutions and religious facilities.

The text then continues by noting that

Manifestations might include the targeting of the state of Israel, conceived as a Jewish collectivity. However, criticism of Israel similar to that leveled against any other country cannot be regarded as antisemitic. Antisemitism frequently charges Jews with conspiring to harm humanity, and it is often used to blame Jews for “why things go wrong.” It is expressed in speech, writing, visual forms and action, and employs sinister stereotypes and negative character traits.

After giving illustrative examples, the document also defines when antisemitic acts consitute hate crimes and when criminal acts should be considered antisemitic, and also defines antisemitic discrimination.

=== Examples ===
The definition was published with a list of "Contemporary examples of antisemitism in public life, the media, schools, the workplace, and in the religious sphere", noting that it was not an exhastive list and that to count as examples would require "taking into account the overall context". Among these were threats of harm, stereotypes and conspiracy theories, attributing collective responsibility to all Jews for any wrongdoing committed by Jews or by Israel, Holocaust denial, charges of dual loyalty, denial of self-determination and double standards.

Seven of the eleven examples mention Israel:

- “Accusing the Jews as a people, or Israel as a state, of inventing or exaggerating the Holocaust”
- “[a]ccusing Jewish citizens of being more loyal to Israel, or to the alleged priorities of Jews worldwide, than to the interests of their own nations”
- “[d]enying the Jewish people their right to self-determination, e.g., by claiming that the existence of a State of Israel is a racist endeavor”
- “[a]pplying double standards by requiring of [Israel] a behavior not expected or demanded of any other democratic nation”
- “[u]sing the symbols and images associated with classic antisemitism (e.g., claims of Jews killing Jesus or blood libel) to characterize Israel or Israelis”
- “[d]rawing comparisons of contemporary Israeli policy to that of the Nazis”
- “[h]olding Jews collectively responsible for actions of the state of Israel.”

== The European Monitoring Centre on Racism and Xenophobia (EUMC) and the drafting of the definition ==
The Commission on Racism and Xenophobia (CRX) was established in 1994 to monitor different forms of racism and xenophobia. In 1998, it became the European Monitoring Centre on Racism and Xenophobia (EUMC), following Council Regulation (EC) No 1035/97 of 2 June 1997. In 2002, it published a large-scale monitoring report on Islamophobia since 9/11, including a total of 75 reports, 15 from each member state, and a synthesis report.

In 2003, EUMC commissioned a report on antisemitism. The context for this was a rise in antisemitic incidents in the period of the Second Intifada of 2001-2, and calls for European authorities to address this (including the influential interventions by Canadian human rights scholar and parliamentarian Irwin Cotler), as well as the identification by Swedish politician Per Ahlmark and others of the concept of the "collective Jew" as part of a "new antisemitism"; this all led to the Organization for Security and Cooperation in Europe (OSCE) organizing its first conference on antisemitism in 2003, as well as the EUMC study.

The commissioned report, written by the Centre for Research on Antisemitism (ZfA) in Berlin, was suppressed by the EUMC, which then wrote its own report. In December 2003, the ZfA analyzed a pre-release version of the EUMC report, which was leaked to the press and, according to civil rights lawyers Kenneth L. Marcus and Kenneth S. Stern, was badly received. The report initially said the primary cause of rising antisemitism in Europe was young Muslim males, while a press release for the subsequent final publication attributed the rise to "young, disaffected white Europeans", although the final report itself was more nuanced.

The EUMC report was entitled Manifestations of antisemitism in the EU 2002–2003, and was published in May 2004 incorporating a second report on perceptions of antisemitism based on interviews with European Jews. The antisemitism report was based on data collected by the 15 contact points of EUMC's monitoring network, RAXEN, and evaluated by Alexander Pollak, an independent researcher.

The report noted that in compiling the report, only nine of its 15 contact points used an explicit definition of antisemitism, and that those nine were all different, and that this generated problems of comparability in the data. It therefore included a section (written by Pollak and Alexander Joskovicz) on definitions. This cited Brian Klug's argument that antisemitism "is best defined not by an attitude towards Jews but by a definition of 'Jew'" and who regards antisemitism as "the process of turning Jews into 'Jews'", and concluded by proposing this definition in order to collect and compare incidents across countries:

Any acts or attitudes that are based on the perception of a social subject (individual, group, institution, or state) as "the ('deceitful', 'corrupt', 'conspiratorial', etc.) Jew".

The report explored the question of when anti-Zionist or anti-Israel expression might be antisemitic, Marcus describes this as a "figural definition". It was based on "seven stereotypical traits: deceptiveness, strange-ness, hostility, greed, corruption, conspiratorial power, and deicidal murderousness". The EUMC report concluded that anti-Israeli and anti-Zionist expression could only be considered antisemitic if it was based on the stereotype of Israel as the collective Jew, leading Marcus to conclude that "it generated a standard under which most forms of anti-Israel animus would appear to be excluded, even if they resulted in violence against individual non-Israeli Jews", as in a Montreal school firebombing that occurred days after the report was released.

Following the EUMC report, the OSCE's Berlin Declaration, made at the organization's second conference on the topic, recognised that post-World War II antisemitism had taken on "new forms and manifestations" and was now at times directed against Jews as a collective body; Marcus comments that "certain forms of hostility toward Israel have targeted Israel as a collective Jew." The Berlin Declaration also tasked the OSCE's Office for Democratic Institutions and Human Rights (ODIHR) to work with the EUMC to develop better ways to monitor antisemitic incidents in OSCE countries. According to Marcus, the EUMC scrapped this failed definition of antisemitism, largely due to pressure from American Jewish organizations.

=== 2004-5 drafting and publication ===
According to Kenneth S. Stern of the AJC, a human rights lawyer, Israeli scholar Dina Porat, then head of the Stephen Roth Institute at Tel Aviv University, proposed the idea for a common definition of antisemitism during an NGO conference organized by the American Jewish Committee (AJC) in April 2004. Stern was critical of the EUMC's original definition, as it was confusing about when attacks on Jews related to the Israel–Palestine conflict could be considered antisemitic, and required investigators to know the intentions of attackers. Meanwhile, the EUMC asked Jewish NGOs and academics to provide "a simple working definition that would encompass antisemitic demonization of Israel, and which could also be used by their own RAXEN network of national focal points and by law enforcement agencies". According to the AJC's Andrew Baker and Deidre Berger and the Community Security Trust's Michael Whine,

the information provided by the EUMC's monitors was limited in some cases because there was scant data on antisemitic hate crimes and limited polling data on anti-Jewish attitudes. In its own internal review, the EUMC acknowledged that it was hampered by the lack of a common and comprehensive definition of antisemitism and challenged by a lack of clarity in understanding those "new forms and manifestations" of antisemitism as it relates to Israel. EUMC Director Beate Winkler and AJC Director of International Jewish Affairs Rabbi Andrew Baker agreed that summer to work together to develop such a definition.

During 2003–04, a large group of experts and organisations coordinated by Stern—together with Dina Porat; Holocaust scholars Yehuda Bauer, Michael Berenbaum and Roni Stauber; Baker, Berger and Whine; human rights expert Felice D. Gaer; and others—drafted a proposed definition and set of examples. According to Baker, Berger and Whine, "Ken [Stern] played the vitally important but limited role of being the communications hub as various drafts and proposed language were circulated, slowly moving toward a consensus agreement where his role ended. All agreed the definition should include both a core paragraph defining the basic nature of antisemitism and clear examples of its traditional and more contemporary forms." The 2004 draft working definition said:

Antisemitism is hatred toward Jews because they are Jews and is directed toward the Jewish religion and Jews individually or collectively. More recently, antisemitism has been manifested in the demonization of the State of Israel. Antisemitism frequently charges Jews with conspiring to harm humanity, and it is often used to blame Jews for "why things go wrong". It is expressed in speech, writing, visual forms and action, and employs sinister stereotypes and negative character traits. (It may also be manifested on people mistaken as Jews, or on non-Jews seen as sympathetic to Jews.)

This was then followed by a list of illustrative examples, including five examples of the ways in which antisemitism manifests itself with regard to Israel. According to both Marcus and Antony Lerman, the novel element in this draft definition was identifying certain criticism of Israel and Zionism as antisemitic. Marcus also highlights the "praxeological" nature of the definition and its examples—i.e. its focus on pragmatic identification rather than scholarly understanding.

According to Stern, at the suggestion of the AJC the EUMC director organized a meeting of Jewish representatives to discuss the draft definition. The consultation involved representatives of the AJC and European Jewish Congress, the EUMC director and head of research, and the ODIHR Tolerance and Non-Discrimination program director and antisemitism expert. The outcome was negotiated between Andrew Baker, Stern's colleague at the AJC, and Beate Winkler, director of the EUMC. According to Michael Whine of the Community Security Trust, the Director of the ODIHR Tolerance and Non-Discrimination Division and the Advisor on Antisemitism "played an active role in formulating the Working Definition". Baker, Berger and Whine say that Whine was responsible for the final drafting, working with ODIHR and the EUMC Director and her specialists. They note that "This was to be a guide for better understanding antisemitism, not a speech code etched in stone. To strike the necessary balance, we added the important, conditional phrase, 'depending on the context.' In a further measure to allay these concerns, the EUMC considered it important to state explicitly that criticism of Israel is not antisemitic."

On 28 January 2005, the EUMC published a working definition of antisemitism on its website that shared many features of Stern's earlier draft.

Antisemitism is a certain perception of Jews, which may be expressed as hatred toward Jews. Rhetorical and physical manifestations of antisemitism are directed toward Jewish or non-Jewish individuals and/or their property, toward Jewish community institutions and religious facilities.

According to Marcus, Winkler published the definition "without formal review by her political overseers". Marcus writes that it was a "working definition" in two senses: a working guide to identifying antisemitism in practice, and a work-in-progress as opposed to a final statement to be approved by the EU's political leadership, and "for this reason, formal endorsement was neither sought nor obtained".

The stated purpose of the working definition was to "provide a guide for identifying incidents, collecting data and supporting the implementation and enforcement of legislation dealing with antisemitism".

The definition added that "such manifestations could also target the state of Israel, conceived as a Jewish collectivity." The EUMC illustrated the working definition with eleven examples, saying the list was non-exhaustive and that these might be antisemitic "taking into account the overall context." They were presented as two separate groups: the first six examples were introduced as "Contemporary examples of antisemitism in public life, the media, schools, the workplace, and in the religious sphere". The remaining five examples were introduced as "Examples of the ways in which antisemitism manifests itself with regard to the state of Israel". The second group includes both Holocaust inversion ("Drawing comparisons of contemporary Israeli policy to that of the Nazis") and the application of double standards to Israel, although the definition also says that "criticism of Israel similar to that leveled against any other country cannot be regarded as antisemitic".

The EUMC working definition was prominently referenced by the OSCE Cordoba conference in June that year. According to Lerman, the definition was promoted by the AJC, other American Jewish organizations, national Jewish representative bodies, Jewish defence organizations, the Israeli government, and pro-Israel advocacy groups. It was approved by the OSCE and other pan-European organizations. According to Lerman, the EUMC working definition was widely criticized and the organization was put under pressure by supporters and critics of the definition.

=== Use of the EUMC definition ===
In 2008, the European Forum on Antisemitism commissioned translations of the Working Definition into each of the 33 languages used by the OSCE states.

In 2010, Stern wrote: "In the last five years, the definition has been increasingly used, because it provides a workable, non-ideological approach to task of identifying antisemitism." The definition was used by monitoring agencies and law enforcement officials in some European countries. According to Stern:

[By 2010, the definition had] been referenced or relied upon in or by courts (in Lithuanian and Germany), congressional hearings in the United States, online reference tools, newspapers, blogs, scholarly articles, legal articles, radio shows, student groups, museums, national inquiries of parliamentarians (most importantly in the UK), international meetings of parliamentarians, United States Department of State Reports, The United States Commission on Civil Rights, and in submissions to the United Nations Economic and Social Council Commission on Human Rights, Sub-Commission on the Promotion and Protection of Human Rights ... It continues to be referenced more and more because of its clear utility.

For example, in Lithuania, it was referred to in a successful criminal case against an editor of a right-wing newspaper in 2005. The definition was also used to some extent by certain intergovernmental and EU agencies. For example, the OSCE used the definition in a 2005 report Education on the Holocaust and Antisemitism: An Overview and Analysis of Educational Approaches. By 2010, it was also recommended in the course leaders' Facilitators Guide in the OSCE OHDIR programme to assist law enforcement officials to understand and investigate hate crime, and the 2010 OSCE High Level Conference on Tolerance and Non-Discrimination in Astana urged participating states to use and promote the Working Definition. In February 2009, the first conference of the Inter-parliamentary Coalition for Combating Antisemitism, issued the London Declaration on Combating Antisemitism, calling to governments to expand the use of the Working Definition. The second annual conference, held in Ottawa, Canada, in association with the Canadian Parliamentary Coalition to Combat Antisemitism and the Canadian Government on 7–9 November 2010, issued the Ottawa Protocol, including a commitment to "reaffirm the EUMC – now Fundamental Rights Agency (FRA) – working definition".

Canadian Members of Parliament adopted a resolution to combat antisemitism in 2007 that cited the EUMC definition, and the Australian Online Hate Prevention Institute. According to Andrew Baker of the AJC, the definition is used by the Justice Ministers of Austria and Germany in training prosecutors and judges.

==== United Kingdom ====
In 2006, the All-Party Parliamentary Inquiry into Antisemitism recommended that the UK adopt the definition and that it be promoted by the Government and law enforcement agencies. The Government Response the following year recognised the "useful work being done by the EUMC in identifying antisemitic discourse", noted that the government accepted the definition of racism in the MacPherson Report on institutional racism and that this subsumed the EUMC and went further. It also noted that "from the EUMC's evidence to the Committee", the "definition is in fact a work in progress and has not been recommended to states for adoption". However, it undertook to re-examine this if the EUMC's successor body, the FRA, did recommend it for adoption, an undertaking it repeated the following year in its progress report on implementing the Inquiry's recommendations, noting this had been delayed by the process of transforming into the FRA delayed this. In 2009, the leaders of the Labour and Conservative parties signed the London Declaration endorsing the definition.

The National Union of Students formally adopted the Working Definition at its 2007 Conference. Some individual students' unions followed suit, although motions to do so at other unions were defeated. In 2011, the University and College Union passed a resolution opposing the use of the definition, which led to the Jewish Leadership Council and Board of Deputies of British Jews describing the union as "institutionally antisemitic".

On 1 January 2015, Professor David Feldman stated in a Sub-Report for the Parliamentary Committee Against Antisemitism that the definition "largely has fallen out of favour" due to the criticisms it received.

==== United States ====
According to Ken Marcus, the United States Commission on Civil Rights, after investigating campus antisemitism, adopted the definition to help universities identify the lines between hateful and non-hateful incidents. According to the AJC, the EUMC definition was adopted in 2007 as "an initial guide" by the Office to Monitor and Combat Antisemitism within the U.S. Department of State, stating that it "should not be construed ... as United States policy".

In 2008, the State Department again endorsed the Working Definition in their Contemporary Global Antisemitism report to Congress, noting: "a widely accepted definition of antisemitism can be useful in setting the parameters of the issue. Such a definition also helps to identify the statistics that are needed and focuses attention on the issues that policy initiatives should address ... The EUMC's working definition provides a useful framework for identifying and understanding the problem and is adopted for the purposes of this report."

In June 2010, the State Department adopted a definition based on the EUMC definition. According to Marcus, the State Department definition was more important in determining U.S. government foreign policy while it was in effect than the EUMC definition since it represented an official policy position.

In 2011, the AJC's Ken Stern and Cary Nelson, President of the American Association of University Professors, published a letter stating: "It is a perversion of the definition to use it, as some are doing, in an attempt to censor what a professor, student, or speaker can say." This generated significant controversy within the American Jewish community.

On 12 January 2016, Peter Roskam and Tim Scott introduced a bipartisan bill in the House and Senate on combating antisemitism on campus, under the title of The Antisemitism Awareness Act, to codify the working definition. It would require the US Department of Education to refer to the definition in deciding if educational institutions had violated Title VI of the Civil Rights Act of 1964 by tolerating antisemitic harassment. It was passed in the Senate, and on 22 December 2016 it was referred to the United States House Judiciary Subcommittee on the Constitution and Civil Justice. This hearing was held on 7 November 2017; it "took a heated turn" as four of the nine witnesses argued that the definition infringes on freedom of speech regarding Israel.

On 23 May 2018, the same bills were reintroduced with minor amendments. On 24 July 2018, they were referred again to the Subcommittee on the Constitution and Civil Justice. The Bill was criticised as an attack on free speech, including by the American Civil Liberties Union (ACLU) and James Zogby of the Arab American Institute.

=== Removal under Fundamental Rights Agency ===
The EUMC never granted any official status to the definition. In 2007, the EU replaced the EUMC with the Fundamental Rights Agency (FRA), with a broader remit than racism and antisemitism. It has continued to deliver annual reports of antisemitic incidents in the EU countries, based on data from its national contact points.

Richard Kuper reported that the FRA told him around 2011 that: "Since its development we are not aware of any public authority in the EU that applies it [and the] FRA has no plans for any further development." He noted that an August 2010 FRA publication on antisemitism did not mention the working definition.

Following on from the EUMC's 2004 report, the FRA's 2012 overview of antisemitic incidents since 2001 equated "new antisemitism" with anti-Zionism. FRA also used the term "secondary antisemitism" to define similar accusations against Jews for using the Holocaust to manipulate non-Jews.

In 2013, the FRA confirmed that it did not have the authority to "either set or repudiate any definitions" of antisemitism. In November of that year, the FRA removed the definition from its website in "a clear-out of non-official documents"; a spokesperson stated at the time: "We are not aware of any official definition [of antisemitism]." In April 2016, Middle East Monitor reported that, in response to a motion passed at the UK National Union of Students annual conference endorsing the definition, the FRA stated that the working definition "is not an official EU definition and has not been adopted by FRA".

== IHRA publication ==
On 26 May 2016, IHRA adopted a non-legally-binding working definition of antisemitism, based on the EUMC's definition. Following the efforts of Mark Weitzman of the Simon Wiesenthal Center, the IHRA's 31 member countries voted to adopt the two-sentence definition at its Bucharest plenary meeting on 30 May 2016. Weitzman later said that the EUMC definition was used as there was "not enough time to invent a new one".

The definition is followed by a list of 11 examples which the IRHA says "may serve as illustrations" to guide its work. According to Antony Lerman, who took part in the plenary, the 38-word definition was adopted unanimously, although the examples that follow the definition were separated from it to achieve consensus. Lerman says:

The discussions, as I remember them, were quite intense and lengthy, both in the couloirs and in the plenary hall, until a decisive step was taken by the presidency, on the demand by some member states. Namely, the original draft text was cut into two, and only the first two-sentence part was to be the working-definition to be adopted, while the other part, the examples, remained what they were: examples to serve as illustrations, to guide the IHRA in its work. From then on, the plenary was able to move quickly on, and the non-legally binding working definition was unanimously adopted.

The first IHRA example says: "Manifestations might include the targeting of the state of Israel, conceived as a Jewish collectivity. However, criticism of Israel similar to that leveled against any other country cannot be regarded as antisemitic." After "taking into account the overall context", the examples of what might constitute antisemitism include claims of Jewish dual loyalty, and "claiming that the existence of a State of Israel is a racist endeavor".

=== Adoption ===
The IHRA working definition of antisemitism (IHRA-WDA) has been adopted for internal use by a number of government and political institutions. The United Kingdom was the first country to adopt the definition (12 December 2016), followed by Israel. By 2018, according to Lerman, the IHRA-WDA had been formally adopted by 6 of the 31 governments whose countries are members of IHRA, though he notes that it is unclear whether those countries adopted the attached examples.

Israel's Minister of Strategic Affairs wrote an op-ed in Newsweek in July 2020 calling for social media companies to fully adopt the working definition. The following month 120 organizations, led by StopAntisemitism.org sent a letter to Facebook's Board of Directors, calling upon them to fully adopt the IHRA-WDA as the "cornerstone of Facebook's hate speech policy regarding antisemitism". According to Neve Gordon, Facebook responded by saying its definition "draws on the spirit—and the text—of the IHRA" working definition but demonstrated reluctance to adopt the examples that relate to Israel, and critics of the IHRA-WDA also lobbied the company not to adopt it.

In October 2020, Albania becoming the first Muslim-majority country to formally adopt the IHRA-WDA. As of September 2021, between 29 and 32 countries had adopted the IHRA-WDA, as well as the European Union, and numerous local governments and institutions around the world.

Member, observer and liaison countries of the IHRA, and adoption of the IHRA-WDA at the national level: Member countries that have adopted the IHRA-WDA / Member countries that have not adopted the IHRA-WDA; Observer and liaison countries that have adopted the IHRA-WDA / Observer and liaison countries that have not adopted the IHRA-WDA; Countries which have adopted the IHRA-WDA but are not member, observer or liaison countries

Adoption of the IHRA Working Definition of Antisemitism by country
Country	Status	Date of adoption
Albania		22 October 2020
Argentina	Member	4 June 2020
Australia	Member	13 October 2021
Austria	Member	25 April 2017
Belgium	Member	14 December 2018
Bosnia and Herzegovina	Observer	22 July 2022
Bulgaria	Member	18 October 2017
Canada	Member	27 June 2019
Colombia		2 June 2022
Croatia	Member	20 January 2023
Cyprus	Observer	18 December 2019
Czech Republic	Member	25 January 2019
Denmark	Member	January 2022
Estonia	Member	29 April 2021
Finland	Member	17 February 2022
France	Member	3 December 2019
Germany	Member	20 September 2017
Greece	Member	8 November 2019
Guatemala		27 January 2021
Hungary	Member	18 February 2019
Ireland	Member	16 January 2025
Israel	Member	22 January 2017
Italy	Member	17 January 2020
Kosovo		8 June 2023
Latvia	Member	11 April 2023
Lithuania	Member	24 January 2018
Luxembourg	Member	10 July 2019
Moldova	Observer	18 January 2019
Netherlands	Member	27 November 2018
North Macedonia	Member	6 March 2018
Panama		10 May 2023
Philippines		18 February 2022
Poland	Member	13 October 2021
Portugal	Member	28 July 2021
Romania	Member	25 May 2017
Scotland		27 April 2017
Serbia	Member	26 February 2020
Slovakia	Member	28 November 2018
Slovenia	Member	20 December 2018
South Korea		4 August 2021
Spain	Member	22 July 2020
Sweden	Member	21 January 2020
Switzerland	Member	4 June 2021
United Kingdom	Member	12 December 2016
United States	Member	11 December 2019
Uruguay	Observer	27 January 2020

==== Europe ====
In late 2016, Russia blocked the Organization for Security and Cooperation in Europe's adoption of the IHRA-WDA. The European Parliament called for member states to adopt the IHRA-WDA on 1 June 2017 – although Lerman notes that this is without explicitly quoting the examples.

===== United Kingdom =====
In March 2016, Eric Pickles, then Secretary of State for Communities and Local Government, recommended the working definition of antisemitism, as used by the UK's College of Policing. In October 2016, the cross-party Commons Home Affairs Select Committee published a report on antisemitism in the UK, noting that the President of the Board of Deputies of British Jews gave evidence describing the IHRA-WDA as "helpful, comprehensive and fit for purpose", as well as some of the criticisms of the definition. The committee recommended official adoption of the IHRA-WDA with some "additional caveats". The caveats were two additional clarifications designed to protect freedom of speech in discussion of Israel/Palestine:

It is not antisemitic to criticise the Government of Israel, without additional evidence to suggest antisemitic intent. It is not antisemitic to hold the Israeli Government to the same standards as other liberal democracies, or to take a particular interest in the Israeli Government's policies or actions, without additional evidence to suggest antisemitic intent.

In December 2016, the UK government said it would adopt the IHRA-WDA, but that the caveats were unnecessary because the definition's clause "criticism of Israel similar to that levelled against any other country cannot be regarded as antisemitic" was sufficient to ensure freedom of speech. Subsequently, the definition has been adopted by some 120 UK councils, as well as the Welsh and Scottish Governments, the Greater Manchester Combined Authority, and the London Assembly and Mayor of London. In July 2018, an Early Day Motion proposed by Labour Party MP Luciana Berger was signed by 39 mainly Labour MPs who welcomed the UK's formal adoption of the definition.

It has also been adopted by religious and educational institutions such as the Church of Scotland and King's College London. In 2017, a resolution to the University and College Union called for the union to formally reject the definition.

In August 2019, Tower Hamlets London Borough Council refused to host the fifth annual charity bike ride event in aid of Palestinian children in Gaza called BigRide4Palestine due to concerns that included the possibility that how it criticised Israel would violate the IHRA-WDA adopted by the council. Antony Lerman concluded that the IHRA-WDA was an obstacle to constructive criticism of Israel. 23 signatories of an open letter to The Guardian stated that the council's refusal to host the charity event vindicated concerns raised about the definition.

In September 2019, Robert Jenrick, the newly appointed Secretary of State for Housing, Communities and Local Government, said it was "unacceptable that places receiving public money, such as universities and local authorities, choose not to accept our IHRA definition of antisemitism and use it when considering matters such as disciplinary procedures". He said he would write to such organisations and that failure to comply would also be "unacceptable".

In 2026, the British Medical Association passed a motion opposing the National Health Service's use of the IHRA working definition of antisemitism and called for a review of its application. That was due to concerns raised by some members that the definition could have implications for freedom of expression in discussions relating to Israel and Palestine. Supporters of the use of the IHRA definition said that it is a safeguard against antisemitism in relevant settings.

====== Labour Party ======
In December 2016, Labour adopted the IHRA-WDA. It was formally accepted at the 2017 Labour Party Conference. In July 2018, the Labour Party's National Executive Committee (NEC) adopted a version of the IHRA-WDA without a vote, although it removed or amended four of the IHRA's 11 examples, added three more, and amended points illustrating how criticising Israel could be antisemitic. Labour said the wording in the code of conduct "expands on and contextualises" the IHRA examples. The Shadow Solicitor-General, Nick Thomas-Symonds, said many of IHRA-WDA's examples were "adopted word for word" in the code of conduct while "the ground is covered" for others. He said: "We should be going further than the IHRA definition and the language of the code is at times much stronger. We need to expand on a lot of the examples to ensure that we have a legally enforceable code so that we can enforce discipline as everyone wants to."

The NEC's modified examples sparked criticism amid allegations of antisemitism in the party, leading the NEC to announce that it would review the decision in consultation with the UK Jewish community. The UK Delegation to the IHRA said that modifying the IHRA-WDA or not including all 11 examples would mean it "is no longer the IHRA definition", would remove the consistency of having a single definition, and "undermines the months of international diplomacy and academic rigour that enabled this definition to exist".

In September 2018, the NEC decided to add all 11 unamended examples to the definition of antisemitism; the IHRA-WDA was subsequently added to the party's standing orders by a majority vote of 205 by the Parliamentary Labour Party.

Later in the month, a report by the Media Reform Coalition examined over 250 articles and broadcast news segments of coverage of Labour's revised code of conduct on antisemitism, and found over 90 examples of misleading or inaccurate reporting. The research found evidence of "overwhelming source imbalance" in which coverage often omitted critical discussion of the IHRA-WDA and wrongly presented it as universally adopted, whilst few news reports stated that mainstream academic and legal opinion was critical of the IHRA working definition, including formal opinions from four leading UK barristers.

====== Other political parties ======
In July 2018, the Conservative Party said it had adopted the definition in full, although their code of conduct, approved in December 2017, did not mention antisemitism or specify a definition of it. Since then their code has been amended to include an interpretive annexe on discrimination, which does refer to the IHRA-WDA and says it was adopted in December 2016 (the date the Conservative government adopted the definition).

In September 2018, the Liberal Democrats formally adopted the IHRA definition with the working examples. In October 2018, Green Party of England and Wales did not adopt the definition. Their home affairs spokesman and former deputy leader, Shahrar Ali, told their annual conference the definition was "politically engineered to restrict criticism of Israel's heinous crimes upon the Palestinian people".

====== Universities ======
According to the results of a Freedom of Information request filed in 2020 by the Union of Jewish Students (UJS), 29 of 133 UK universities had adopted the definition, with a further 80 institutions having no plans to do. Subsequently, U.K. education secretary Gavin Williamson accused institutions of "dragging their feet" and warned that funding streams could be suspended. Following the letter, the UJS said that the number of adoptees rose to 48 while an open letter from a group of lawyers accused the education secretary of "improper interference" with universities' autonomy and right to free expression. In a July 2021 opinion piece for the activist Labour Briefing, Jonathan Rosenhead stated that the government pressure "didn't go down well with university administrations" and that the arrival of the new Jerusalem Declaration on Antisemitism has affected campus debate.

In February 2021, University College London's governing body, having previously adopted the IHRA definition, said that it would reconsider the matter following rejection by an internal academic board which called on the university to "retract and replace IHRA working definition with a more precise definition of antisemitism".

==== Italy ====
In early February 2026, the Italian Senate's Constitutional Affairs Committee approved the draft text of a bill that would allow authorities to ban rallies that promote antisemitism by incorporating the IHRA definition of antisemitism into Italian law, potentially making Italy one of the first countries to use the IHRA definition as a legal basis for prohibiting certain gatherings deemed hateful and dangerous. The draft text, presented by Senator Massimiliano Romeo of the Lega party in late January and approved by the committee by 3 February 2026, will proceed to an amendments phase before full readings in both chambers of Parliament. Supporters contend the measure is necessary to combat rising antisemitism, while critics argue it raises concerns about free speech and the scope of public assembly restrictions. The measure was adopted in November 2026 by a 147-93 margin with the support of Italian prime minister Giorgia Meloni; the leadership of the opposition Greens and Left Alliance said that "the right is exploiting the antisemitism bill to stifle criticism," with the Union of Italian Jewish Communities saying "the fight against antisemitism is not a partisan battle, but a battle for society as a whole".

==== Oceania ====
===== Australia =====
On 14 October 2021, Australian Prime Minister Scott Morrison announced that Australia would formally adopt the IHRA-WDA. While the announcement was welcomed by Zionist advocacy groups including AIJAC (the Australia/Israel and Jewish Affairs Council) and the Zionist Federation of Australia, the New Israel Fund Australia and Australia Palestine Advocacy Network expressed concerns that the IHRA definition could be used to silence criticism of Israeli policies and actions.

In 2022, the sole One Nation MP in the Parliament of South Australia, Sarah Game, introduced a motion to adopt the definition, which was passed in July 2022 after amendments were voted down. The move was welcomed by the Jewish Community Council of South Australia, and brought South Australia into line with the federal government, as well as with the New South Wales and Victorian governments.

On 10 July 2025, the first report of Australia's Special Envoy to Combat Antisemitism urged adoption of the IHRA working definition and its examples throughout Australian government and society "as best practice for identifying antisemitism". It proposed that failure to conform to that standard should result in withdrawal or denial of government funding, or of charitable status, for any organisation, including universities. A "supplementary guide" to applying the definition is promised. The report was welcomed by some Jewish organizations but criticized by others. It was criticized in several quarters for a chilling of free speech particularly as to Israeli Government policies, and a Trumpian threat to the independence of universities and arts organisations. Kenneth Stern, the definition's lead drafter, said that it would be a "disaster" for Australia to adopt the proposal to deal with antisemitism mainly by restricting speech.

The federal government said in July 2025 that it would respond to the report after receiving a report from the special envoy on Islamophobia, due in August, and a final report on racism in universities from the Australian Human Rights Commission, due in October.

National broadcasters ABC and SBS have declined to use the IHRA definition, each preferring their own. It has since been adopted by the Australian Health Practitioner Regulation Agency, although more than 1400 practitioners and 60 health and medical organisations have collectively protested that the adoption could “target practitioners for lawful advocacy”.

===== New Zealand =====
On 24 June 2022, New Zealand formally became an observer of the IHRA. The announcement was welcomed by the New Zealand Jewish Council and the Holocaust Centre of New Zealand as a tool to "combat anti-semitism" and "the rise in anti-Jewish sentiment". Palestine Solidarity Network Aotearoa opposed the decision, stating in a press release that New Zealand should instead adopt the Jerusalem Declaration on Antisemitism.

==== North America ====
===== United States =====
On 11 December 2019, President Donald Trump signed Executive Order 13899 on combatting antisemitism. The order specifies that agencies responsible for enforcement of Title VI of the Civil Rights Act of 1964 must take into consideration the IHRA-WDA, as well as the IHRA list of contemporary examples of antisemitism, "to the extent that any examples might be useful as evidence of discriminatory intent", when investigating complaints, expanding Title VI to protect against discrimination based on antisemitism.

On May 25, 2023, the Biden administration did not fully embrace the IHRA-WDA when it launched the U.S. National Strategy to Counter Antisemitism despite significant pressure to do so, but noted it alongside the Nexus Document.

An attempt to enshrine the definition in US federal law in 2024 encountered strong opposition, with 1,200 Jewish academics opposing the move as a dangerous conflation of criticism of Israel with antisemitism that would threaten freedom of speech. Their open letter said: "Criticism of the state of Israel, the Israeli government, policies of the Israeli government, or Zionist ideology is not — in and of itself — antisemitic."

On 1 May 2024, amidst the ongoing Gaza war protests at universities, the Antisemitism Awareness Act, which was intended to add the International Holocaust Remembrance Alliance's approved working definition of antisemitism to title VI of the Civil Rights Act of 1964, which prohibits "exclusion from participation in, denial of benefits of, and discrimination under federally assisted programs on ground of race, color, or national origin", was passed in the House of Representatives by a margin of 320 to 91 but not introduced in the Senate.

In addition, at a sub-national or institutional level, the United States Department of Education; Missouri and South Carolina; New York City from June 2025 to 1 January 2026, the cities of Bal Harbour and North Miami Beach in Florida, and El Cajon, California; and Western Washington University have adopted the IHRA-WDA.

===== U.S. campuses =====
As of May 2021, the student governments at 30 universities in the United States had adopted the definition. In January 2025, Harvard University adopted the IHRA Working Definition as part of a settlement resolving a lawsuit filed by the Louis D. Brandeis Center for Human Rights Under Law. The lawsuit alleged that Harvard inadequately addressed antisemitic harassment and discrimination on campus. Alongside adopting the definition, Harvard agreed to implement new disciplinary protocols for antisemitic incidents and enhance educational programming for students and faculty. The settlement signified Harvard's commitment to combating antisemitism using a globally recognized standard.

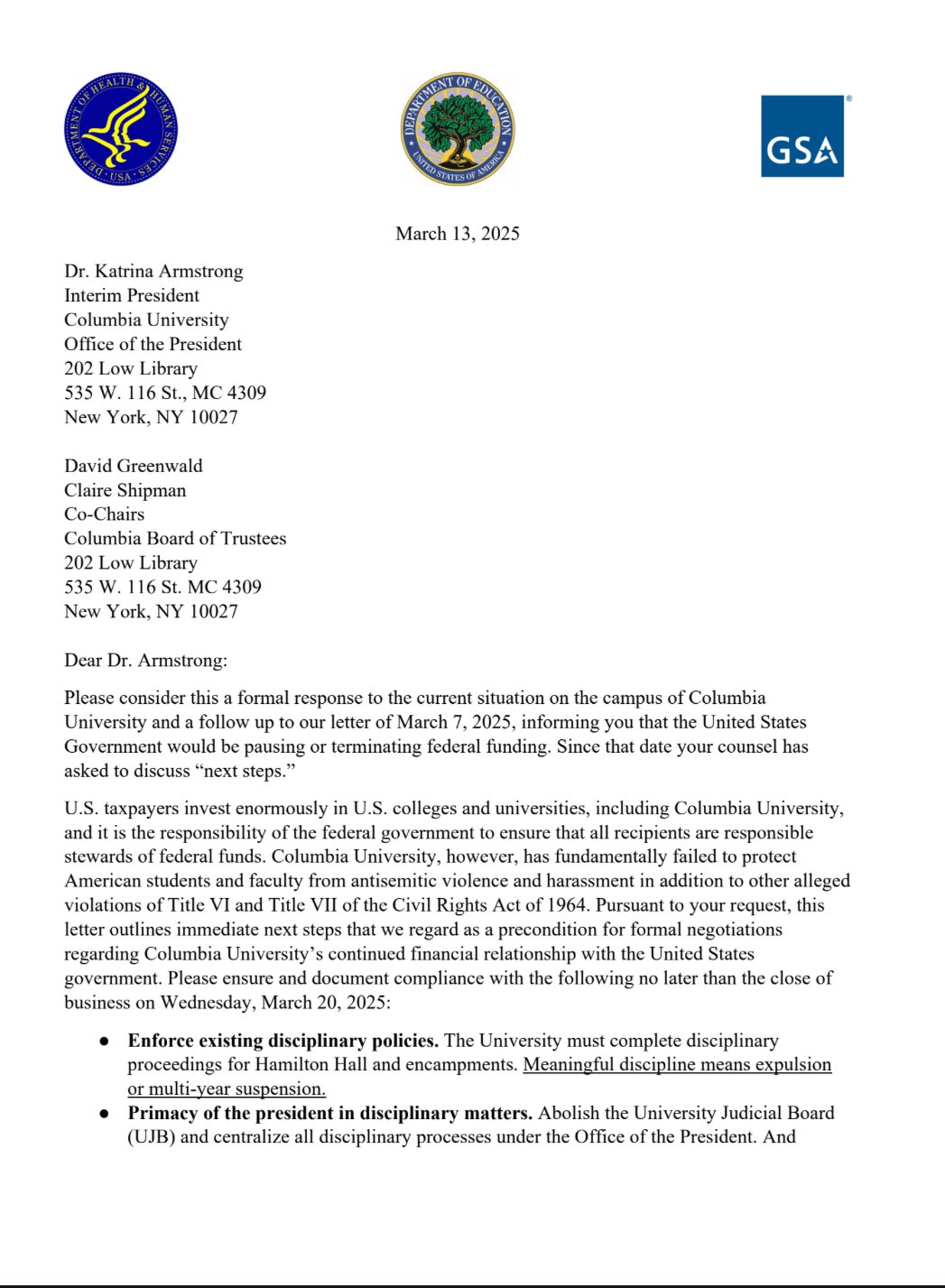
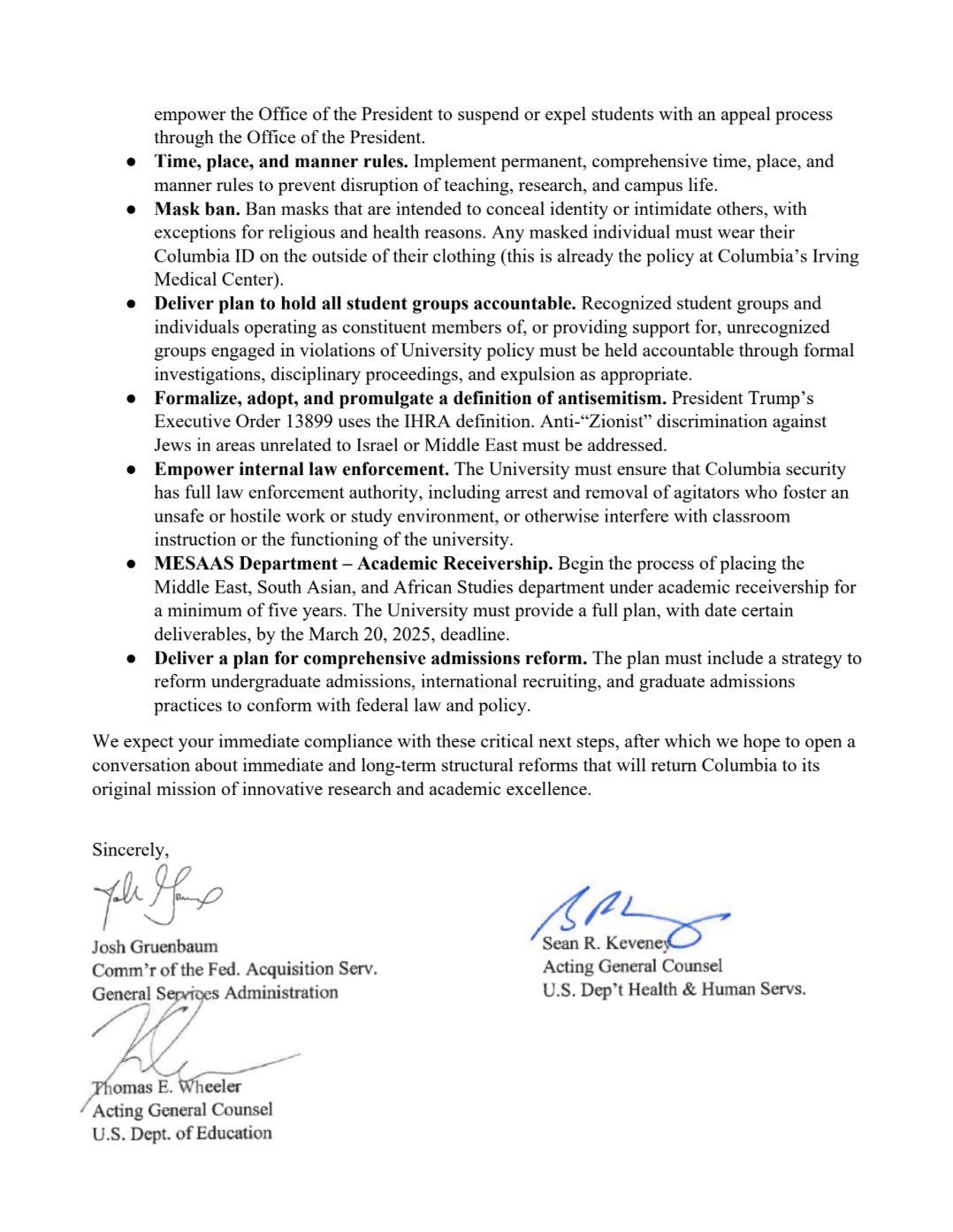
In March 2025, the Trump administration demanded that Columbia "formalize, adopt, and promulgate a definition of antisemitism," specifying that "President Trump's Executive Order 13899 uses the IHRA definition. Anti-"Zionist" discrimination against Jews in areas unrelated to Israel or Middle East must be addressed." On July 15, Columbia announced it would adopt the IHRA definition.

Columbia University adopted the IHRA definition in 2025 in its settlement with the Trump administration. Critics of the decision, including the Knight First Amendment Institute and the American Association of University Professors, condemned the decision for its infringements upon academic freedom and freedom of expression. Columbia professors Marianne Hirsch, a scholar of genocide and memory, and Rashid Khalidi, Palestinian historian and former Edward Said Professor of Modern Arab Studies, have said that the definition would restrict their ability to do their work.

==== United Nations ====
In early 2022, on the occasion of International Holocaust Remembrance Day, United Nations Secretary-General Antonio Guterres reiterated a previous position, acknowledging "the efforts of countries that have agreed on the common definition of antisemitism" while at the same time avoiding any mention of adoption by the UN as demanded by supporters. Guterres recited the definition itself but not the examples. On 31 October 2022, E. Tendayi Achiume, the special rapporteur on contemporary racism, delivered a report that said the IHRA-WDA was both ineffective and had "an impact on the human rights of minorities and vulnerable groups, including Jews", calling the definition "controversial" and "divisive". The United States envoy said he was "disappointed" that the report "politicized the IHRA definition" and Gilad Erdan, the Israeli ambassador, criticised Achiume for making "unfounded recommendations" that "clearly demonstrate a political agenda". In recent years, criticism of the definition has grown with critics arguing that it "primarily targets criticism of Israel and that it has been weaponized against Palestinian activists".

In a statement published on 3 November 2022, 128 scholars, including leading Jewish academics at Israeli, European, United Kingdom and United States universities, said the definition has been "hijacked" and urged the United Nations not to adopt the definition due to its "divisive and polarising" effect. As of 20 April 2023, 104 human and civil rights organisations, including Human Rights Watch and the ACLU, also urged the United Nations not to adopt the definition saying in a letter that "The IHRA definition has often been used to wrongly label criticism of Israel as antisemitic, and thus chill and sometimes suppress, non-violent protest, activism and speech critical of Israel and/or Zionism, including in the US and Europe."

== Analysis ==
=== Academic ===
In March 2005, Brian Klug argued that the definition's examples proscribed legitimate criticism of the human rights record of the Israeli Government by attempting to bring criticism of Israel, and criticism of Israeli actions and criticism of Zionism as a political ideology into the category of antisemitism and racially based violence towards, discrimination against, or abuse of, Jews.

In December 2016, David Feldman wrote: "I fear this definition is imprecise, and isolates antisemitism from other forms of bigotry." He also said: "The text also carries dangers. It trails a list of 11 examples. Seven deal with criticism of Israel. Some of the points are sensible, some are not." He added: "Crucially, there is a danger that the overall effect will place the onus on Israel's critics to demonstrate they are not antisemitic."

In February 2017, a letter signed by 243 British academics, who asserted that the "violation of the rights of Palestinians for more than 50 years" should not be silenced, contends "this definition seeks to conflate criticism of Israel with anti-Semitism" and raised concerns about muddying the definition of antisemitism and restricting free debate on Israel.

In July 2018, Antony Lerman wrote: "investing all in the IHRA working definition of antisemitism is just making matters worse." He later stated that "the case against IHRA is so strong" that "the fundamental principle [is] that IHRA is so flawed it should be abandoned". In August 2019, he wrote: "The vagueness of the 'working definition' of antisemitism has licensed a free-for-all of interpretation, delighting opponents of Palestinian demands for equal rights."

In the same month, Klug wrote: "critics maintain that Labour (or anyone else) has to adopt the IHRA document 'in full'. But the text is not written in stone. It is a working definition with working examples. It is a living document, subject to revision and constantly needing to be adapted to the different contexts in which people apply its definition ... But people of goodwill who genuinely want to solve the conundrum – combating antisemitism while protecting free political speech – should welcome the code as a constructive initiative, and criticise it constructively ... For this to happen, the seas of language are going to have to subside and critics must stop treating the IHRA document as immutable. In the Judaism in which I was nurtured and educated, there is only one text whose status is sacred; and it was not written by a committee of the IHRA."

In August 2018, Rebecca Ruth Gould, Professor of Islamic world and comparative literature at the University of Birmingham, published the first extended scholarly critique of the IHRA definition: "Legal Form and Legal Legitimacy: The IHRA Definition of Antisemitism as a Case Study in Censored Speech" in the journal Law, Culture and the Humanities. Gould described "the IHRA definition as a quasi-law" and documents the meaning of the IHRA document's self-description as "legally non-binding," the history of its application, and the legal dynamics bearing on its deployment in university contexts. In a later opinion piece, Gould stated that "These dimensions are made all the more contentious by its imprecise content and the significant ambiguity around its legal status. On the basis of the many ways in which the IHRA definition has been used to censor speech, particularly on university campuses" and "that the definition's proponents have not paid enough attention to the harms of censoring Israel-critical speech." In the journal article, she also noted that since the adoption of the IHRA definition "at least five universities [in the UK], and likely many more, have had planned events cancelled or otherwise censored due to a perceived need to comply with this definition, even in the absence of its legal ratification."

In July 2019, Geoffrey Alderman wrote: "those who framed the IHRA's Working Definition of antisemitism were well-intentioned, and the definition itself has commendable features. But it's merely a work-in-progress." He later wrote "endorsements have endowed the IHRA definition with almost sacrosanct status. But that does not mean that it is either perfect or even fit for purpose. It is – in fact – neither" and that it is "deeply-flawed and much misunderstood".

Discourse scholar Sue Blackwell described as an example of a persuasive definition, and as a "prime example of language being both the site of, and stake in, struggles for power".

Medical ethicist Jan Deckers and independent scholar Jonathan Coulter argued in a 2022 journal article that "the definition and its list of examples ought to be rejected," due to the fact that "pro-Israel activists can and have mobilised the IHRA document for political goals unrelated to tackling antisemitism, notably to stigmatise and silence critics of the Israeli government," in addition to "intrinsic problems in the way the definition refers to criticism of Israel similar 'to that leveled against any other country', ambiguous wording about 'the power of Jews as a collective', lack of clarity as to the Jewish people's 'right to self-determination', and its denial of obvious racism."

Joshua Shanes wrote in 2022 in the journal Shofar that the IHRA definition has been "effectively weaponized in North America and Europe in debates over Israel and Zionism" and that foundational to its worldview is "the assumption that Palestinians do not constitute a nation grounded in this land, or at least one that needs to be considered like the Jewish nation, and that even individual rights are subject to review by Jewish security needs, as Israel perceives them."

A 6 June 2023 report from the European Legal Support Center, an activist defender of Palestinian rights in Europe, analyzes dozens of case studies and the report authors say that they show the IHRA definition being used to restrict freedom of expression and assembly.

Dave Rich wrote in 2023 that among the "common themes" of the "campaign against the International Holocaust Remembrance Alliance (IHRA) working definition of antisemitism" are "repeated misrepresentation of what the definition does, and does not, say about Israel and antisemitism; unevidenced claims about the definition's alleged impact on free speech; confusion over its legal status and power; and an appeal to authority by quoting others from within this same campaign."

According to Neve Gordon in September 2025, the IHRA definition functions as "a counterinsurgency tool aimed at shielding Israel from resistance to its oppressive form of racial governance and, following its recent war on Gaza, from accusations of genocidal violence," doing this by affectively "interpolating people who identify as Jews to also identify with Israel and Zionism," "t[ying] the right to Jewish difference with a Jewish State and Jewish sovereignty," and "provid[ing] a defence of a regime [Gordon] call[s] 'democratic apartheid.'"

=== Legal ===
In March 2017, human rights lawyer Hugh Tomlinson QC, who had been asked to give an opinion on the definition by Free Speech on Israel, Independent Jewish Voices, Jews for Justice for Palestinians and the Palestine Solidarity Campaign, criticised the IHRA definition as "unclear and confusing", saying it did not have "the clarity which would be required" from a legal definition of antisemitism. He addressed concerns that the definition conflates antisemitism with criticism of Israel and could be misused to curtail campaigning on behalf of Palestinians. He stated:

Properly understood in its own terms the IHRA Definition does not mean that activities such as describing Israel as a state enacting a policy of apartheid, as practising settler colonialism or calling for policies of boycott divestment or sanctions against Israel can properly be characterized as antisemitic. A public authority which sought to apply the IHRA Definition to prohibit or sanction such activities would be acting unlawfully.

He presented his legal opinion on the new working definition at the House of Lords.

In May 2017, former Court of Appeal judge Stephen Sedley wrote an opinion piece in the London Review of Books arguing: "Shorn of philosophical and political refinements, antisemitism is hostility towards Jews as Jews. Where it manifests itself in discriminatory acts or inflammatory speech it is generally illegal, lying beyond the bounds of freedom of speech and of action. By contrast, criticism (and equally defence) of Israel or of Zionism is not only generally lawful: it is affirmatively protected by law. Endeavours to conflate the two by characterising everything other than anodyne criticism of Israel as antisemitic are not new. What is new is the adoption by the UK government (and the Labour Party) of a definition of antisemitism which endorses the conflation." In July 2018, Sedley wrote a letter to The Guardian sayingthe examples "point to the underlying purpose of the text: to neutralise serious criticism of Israel by stigmatising it as a form of antisemitism."

In July 2018, human rights solicitor Geoffrey Bindman wrote: "Unfortunately, the definition and the examples are poorly drafted, misleading, and in practice have led to the suppression of legitimate debate and freedom of expression. Nevertheless, clumsily worded as it is, the definition does describe the essence of antisemitism: irrational hostility towards Jews. The 11 examples are another matter. Seven of them refer to the state of Israel. This is where the problem arises. Some of them at least are not necessarily antisemitic. Whether they are or not depends on the context and on additional evidence of antisemitic intent."

In August 2018, Geoffrey Robertson QC, an expert on freedom of speech and human rights, said that the working definition fails to cover the most prevalent forms of antisemitism to Jewish people, requiring "hatred" but not "hostility". He said that several of the examples are so loosely drafted they are likely to limit free speech, legitimate criticisms of the Israeli Government, and coverage of human rights abuses against Palestinians. He said the definition was not intended to be binding and was not drafted as a comprehensible legal definition, and said the British government's adoption of the working definition had "no legal effect". He recommended that public bodies and organizations adopting the definition follow the Home Affairs Committee recommendation and add the clarification that "it is not anti-Semitic to criticise the Government of Israel without additional evidence to suggest anti-Semitic intent." He concluded that it is "imprecise, confusing and open to misinterpretation and even manipulation", that it is "not fit for any purpose that seeks to use it as an adjudicative standard", and that political action against Israel cannot properly be characterized as antisemitic unless the action is intended to promote hatred or hostility against Jews in general.

==== Kenneth Stern ====
Between 2003 and 2004, as the American Jewish Committee's antisemitism expert, Kenneth S. Stern coordinated the drafting of the original working definition and its examples. Stern has condemned the use of the IHRA definition to attack the freedom of expression and academic freedom, particularly with regard to the restriction of speech regarding Palestine, and has spoken against its adoption as official policy.

In 2015, he re-affirmed his belief in its efficacy: "No definition of something as complex as antisemitism can be perfect, but this one, ten years after its creation, remains a very good one." As well as for its original purpose "as a tool for data collectors" in Europe, Stern also encouraged the United States' first Special Envoy for Monitoring and Combating Antisemitism to "promote the definition as an important tool", and said that he used it effectively as the framework for a report on global antisemitism.

Stern has opposed efforts to require universities to adopt the working definition in their policies, whether voluntarily or by legal instrument, saying: "It was never intended to be a campus hate speech code." He says the working definition has been abused in Title VI cases in an attempt to "restrict academic freedom and punish political speech." He has also written to members of the US Congress to warn that giving the definition legal status would be "unconstitutional and unwise". He has further questioned whether definitions created by minority groups should be legislatively enshrined, giving as one of several examples:

Imagine a definition designed for Palestinians. If 'Denying the Jewish people their right to self-determination, and denying Israel the right to exist' is antisemitism, then shouldn't 'Denying the Palestinian people their right to self-determination, and denying Palestine the right to exist' be anti-Palestinianism? Would they then ask administrators to police and possibly punish campus events by pro-Israel groups who oppose the two state solution, or claim the Palestinian people are a myth?

In December 2019, Stern suggested that approaches to anti-antisemitism that "endorse and promote academic freedom" were more likely to succeed, in part because they may "underscore the academy's goal of increasing knowledge and promoting critical thinking". He said that approaches which "harm" academic freedom will instead exacerbate antisemitism on campuses.

In September 2025, following Columbia's adoption of the definition in relation to its settlement with the Trump administration, Stern wrote:

If the proponents of the IHRA definition were completely honest, they would tell you that the debate about the definition is really about how to treat pro-Palestinian speech, not antisemitism writ large. The history of the abuse of the IHRA definition demonstrates the desire is largely political—it is not so much a desire to identify antisemitism, but rather to label certain speech about Israel as antisemitic. And this effort harms our ability to identify actual antisemitism. When I ran AJC's desk I jealously guarded the term and when it wasn't a clear case, although I might have criticized the expression at hand, I wouldn't use the "A" word. I wanted the word to sting. But when the pump is primed to overclassify political expressions as antisemitic, the word loses not only its bite but its meaning.

== Criticism ==
An updated list of individuals and organizations opposed to the adoption of the Working Definition, including Independent Jewish Voices (Canada), was posted in the Times of Israel blogs by the National Coordinator of Independent Jewish Voices Canada. Jewish Voice for Labour (JVL) saw the working definition as "attempts to widen the definition of antisemitism beyond its meaning of hostility towards, or discrimination against, Jews as Jews". JVL also stated that the IHRA examples of antisemitism fell short of providing "a clear and unambiguous statement based on attitudes to Jews as Jews, not attitudes to a country, Israel".

The British civil liberties advocacy group Liberty passed a motion in May 2018 resolving that the definition could constitute a threat to freedom of expression by "conflating anti-semitism with criticism of Israel and legitimate defense of the rights of Palestinians." A statement signed by 39 left-wing Jewish organizations in 15 countries, including six based in the UK, was released in July that year criticising the working definition, declaring that it was "worded in such a way as to be easily adopted or considered by western governments to intentionally equate legitimate criticisms of Israel and advocacy for Palestinian rights with antisemitism, as a means to suppress the former" and that "this conflation undermines both the Palestinian struggle for freedom, justice and equality and the global struggle against antisemitism. It also serves to shield Israel from being held accountable to universal standards of human rights and international law." The statement went on to urge governments, municipalities, universities and other institutions to reject the IHRA definition.

The leaders of Americans for Peace Now (APN) wrote to the Conference of Presidents of Major American Jewish Organizations (CoP) in November 2020 that APN "will not adopt the full version of the IHRA Working Definition of Antisemitism (with the accompanying examples)". They clarified that "The problem is not with the definition itself but rather with the accompanying examples, which CoP members are requested to endorse as an integral part of the definition. Some of these examples go far beyond what can reasonably be regarded as antisemitism. They cross the line into the realm of politics and are already being used to score political points in the United States, and to quash legitimate criticism of deplorable Israeli government policies."

In January 2021, 66 UK Israeli academics wrote an open letter to Vice Chancellors, Members of Academic Senates, all other UK Academics and Students, calling on "all academic senates to reject governmental decrees to adopt it, or, where adopted already, act to revoke it", in response to Education Secretary Gavin Williamson's attempt to force universities to adopt it, stating that it "inhibits free speech and academic freedom; it deprives Palestinians of their own legitimate voice within the UK public space; and, finally, it inhibits us, as Israeli nationals, from exercising our democratic right to challenge our own government." In February 2021, the lead signatory of that letter, Hagit Borer, opposed the Working Definition in the Times Higher Education Supplement, affirming that "It contradicts universities' commitment to free speech and academic freedom, and it undermines the ongoing fight against racism, including antisemitism, in all its ugly forms."

Independent Jewish Voices (Canada) (IJV) launched an academic petition and a petition for Jewish-Canadian academics in Spring 2021 against the working definition, initially signed by more than 500 and more than 150 scholars respectively (the former reaching over 600 as of early 2022). According to IJV, 32 faculty associations and academic unions in Canada have taken positions against it. Following its participation in the Malmö International Forum on Holocaust Remembrance and Combating Antisemitism in October 2021, the Canadian government pledged to "continue to enhance the adoption and implementation of the IHRA working definition of antisemitism". Subsequently, according to IJV and Middle East Monitor, in November 2021, the Canadian Association of University Teachers (CAUT), representing 72,000 academic faculty and staff at some 125 universities and colleges, passed a motion opposing the adoption of the IHRA definition by Canadian academic institutions.

The American Civil Liberties Union wrote a letter to U.S. Education Secretary Miguel Cardona in February 2024, warning that the IHRA definition of antisemitism could limit free speech about the Israeli-Palestinian conflict at U.S. colleges and universities.

== Other definitions of antisemitism ==
=== Sharansky's three Ds ===
In 2003, Israeli politician Natan Sharansky developed what he called the "three D" test to distinguish antisemitism from criticism of Israel, giving delegitimization, demonization, and double standards as a litmus test for the former, elements of which were incorporated into the EUMC working definition.

=== Nexus Document ===
The Nexus Task Force, created in November 2019, analyzes issues at the intersection of Israel and antisemitism. The task force has published "Israel and Antisemitism: Policy at the Nexus of Two Critical Issues", described as "a resource designed for policymakers and community leaders, aiming to enhance their understanding of the issues that intersect at the nexus of antisemitism, Israel, and Zionism". It has also published the Nexus White Paper, titled "Understanding Antisemitism at its Nexus with Israel and Zionism", and the Nexus "Guide to Identifying Antisemitism in Debates about Israel". Kenneth S. Stern, who contributed to the drafting of the working definition and its examples, is an ex officio member of the Nexus Task Force. The "U.S. National Strategy to Counter Antisemitism", released on 25 May 2023, states that "the Administration welcomes and appreciates the Nexus Document".

=== Independent Jewish Voices Canada ===
In 2020, Independent Jewish Voices Canada published a definition of antisemitism which equates it with all other forms of discrimination, saying: "antisemitism is not an exceptional form of bigotry. People who hate, discriminate and/or attack Jews, will also hate, discriminate and/or attack other protected groups—including racialized people, Muslims, LGBTQ2+, women, [and] Indigenous peoples." They explicitly limit their definition of antisemitism to behaviour "most often associated with white supremacy".

=== Jerusalem Declaration on Antisemitism ===
Objections to the IHRA Definition of Antisemitism motivated the creation of the Jerusalem Declaration on Antisemitism, released in March 2021. This document, signed by some 200 international scholars, is intended to be used instead of the IHRA definition, or as a supplement to guide interpretation of the IHRA definition for groups that have already adopted it.

It gives a brief definition: "Antisemitism is discrimination, prejudice, hostility or violence against Jews as Jews (or Jewish institutions as Jewish)." This is followed by fifteen guidelines, including examples relating to Israel/Palestine that, "on the face of it" either are or aren't antisemitic.

=== U.S. National Strategy to Counter Antisemitism ===
The U.S. National Strategy to Counter Antisemitism, issued in May 2023, states: "Antisemitism is a stereotypical and negative perception of Jews, which may be expressed as hatred of Jews. It is prejudice, bias, hostility, discrimination, or violence against Jews for being Jews or Jewish institutions or property for being Jewish or perceived as Jewish. Antisemitism can manifest as a form of racial, religious, national origin, and/or ethnic discrimination, bias, or hatred; or, a combination thereof. However, antisemitism is not simply a form of prejudice or hate. It is also a pernicious conspiracy theory that often features myths about Jewish power and control."

== See also ==
- New antisemitism
- Livingstone Formulation
