= Human rights (disambiguation) =

Human rights are moral principles or norms that describe certain standards of human behaviour.

Human Rights may also refer to individual birth right.

- Human Rights (album), by Wadada Leo Smith
- Human Rights (journal), a defunct American political magazine

== See also ==
- Civil rights (disambiguation)
- Centre for Human Rights
- Human Rights League (disambiguation)
- Ministry of Human Rights (disambiguation)
