= Kenneth S. Stern =

American attorney and an author

- Born: United States
- Occupations: Defense attorney, author
- Writing career
- Genres: non-fiction, history
- Subjects: Antisemitism, hate studies

Kenneth S. Stern is an American attorney and an author. He is the director of the Bard Center for the Study of Hate, a program of the Human Rights Project at Bard College. From 2014 to 2018 he was the executive director of the Justus & Karin Rosenberg Foundation. From 1989 to 2014 he was the director of antisemitism, hate studies and extremism for the American Jewish Committee. In 2000, Stern was a special advisor to the defense in the David Irving v. Penguin Books and Deborah Lipstadt trial. His 2020 book, The Conflict Over the Conflict: The Israel/Palestine Campus Debate, examines attempts of partisans of each side to censor the other, and the resulting damage to the academy.

== Education ==
Stern earned his B.A. in political science at Bard College, and his J.D. from Willamette University College of Law.

== Career ==
Stern has testified before US Congress; in 1997 he served as an invited presenter at the White House Conference on Hate Crimes. With Dina Porat, he has analyzed the American militia movement, bigotry on campus, hate on talk radio and the Internet. He is a frequent guest on national television and talk radio shows, including Face the Nation, Crossfire, Nightline, Dateline, Good Morning America, CBS Evening News, and National Public Radio. His report Militias: A Growing Danger, issued two weeks before the Oklahoma City bombing, predicted such attacks on the US government. And his book about the militias, A Force Upon the Plain: The American Militia Movement and the Politics of Hate (1996) was nominated for the National Book Award.

In 2001 he was an official member of the United States delegation to the Stockholm International Forum on Combating Intolerance. Stern was one of the drafters of a Working Definition of Antisemitism, which has been adopted, starting in January 2005, by various international bodies tasked with monitoring antisemitism.

Before coming to AJC in 1989, Stern was managing partner of the Oregon law firm Rose and Stern. Stern was trial and appellate counsel for American Indian Movement co-founder Dennis Banks, and argued on his behalf before the United States Supreme Court in U.S. v. Loud Hawk et al. Among his other notable cases was his representation of Portland's homeless community in a federal lawsuit against an anti-camping ordinance, and as co-counsel in a defamation suit against Patricia Hearst, representing Jack and Micki Scott. His book about the Dennis Banks case, Loud Hawk: The United States vs. the American Indian Movement (1994), won the Gustave Myers Center Award as outstanding book on human rights.

Stern's other books are Holocaust Denial (1993) and Antisemitism Today (2006).

Stern is also active in the effort to establish an interdisciplinary academic field of Hate Studies. He previously served on the editorial board of the Journal of Hate Studies, and is a longtime member of the director's advisory board for the Gonzaga University Institute for Hate Studies.

== Views ==
In his article "Holocaust education alone won't stop hate", Stern proposes ways to combat persisting hatred of Jews:

Human rights organizations must be challenged when they do not sufficiently assert that freedom from anti-Semitism is a human right.

Governments must be engaged to ensure that they investigate and prosecute anti-Semitic hate crimes fully.

Monitoring groups must catalog not only the old-fashioned forms of religious and racial anti-Semitism, but also the more contemporary forms that treat the Jewish state in the same bigoted manner that traditional anti-Semitism regards the individual Jew. Campus administrations need to uphold the highest academic standards and make certain that while heated debate is encouraged, intimidation is prohibited.

In an open letter, coauthored with Cary Nelson, president of the American Association of University Professors, Stern wrote that some of the complaints about antisemitism on campus under Title VI of the Civil Rights Act of 1964 "simply seek to silence anti-Israel discourse and speakers. This approach is not only unwarranted under Title VI, it is dangerous." Stern's letter was disavowed by AJC executive director David Harris, who called the letter "ill-advised." In 2017 Stern testified before the House Judiciary Committee against legislation that would have used a definition of antisemitism, of which he was the lead drafter, as a de facto hate speech code on campus.

In his 2006 book Antisemitism Today, Stern wrote:

"Today's main practitioners of race-based antisemitism in the U.S. are neo-Nazis, skinheads, Christian Identity adherents (who believe that people of color are subhuman and that Jews are the offspring of Satan), and various other white supremacists and white nationalists. While there are important ideological and theological differences among these groups, they all hate nonwhites. They also see Jews as responsible for opening the door to equal rights and opportunity for nonwhites, as part of a nefarious plot to destroy 'white America' through immigration, affirmative action, control of the media, and other alleged schemes. While we think of white supremacists as essentially anti-people-of-color with some antisemitism thrown in, antisemitism is actually the ideological (as opposed to emotional) anchor for their movement. If blacks and other minorities are, in their view, unquestionably inferior, how could the superior whites be "losing" the battle? The white supremacists believe it is because of the secret, cabalistic hand of the Jew, pulling the strings behind the scenes. It is because of ZOG (the Zionist Occupied Government). While race-based antisemitism is at a low point, and has been for many decades, there are reasons to be concerned about its possible growth in the decades to come, particularly because demographic projections indicate that the United States will be a majority nonwhite country by the middle of this century. The race-based antisemitism which is at the core of white supremacy may prove an ideological magnet for people who fear this change."

In his book A Force upon the Plain: The American Militia Movement and the Politics of Hate, Stern links Oklahoma City bomber Timothy McVeigh with the American militia movement. In a review in Reason, Dave Kopel concludes that he "does not come remotely close to showing that militia members encouraged McVeigh to do anything illegal", but uses circumstantial evidence, guilt by association and undocumented quotes that turn out to be false. Not only militias, but all critics of big government are excoriated in the book. After the 1994 elections, Stern found that "the vitriolic antifederal sentiments of some of these newly elected officials" differed "in detail but not in flavor" from the ideas of racist gangs. Kopel considers his use of charges of antisemitism and racism as a way of vilifying opponents and delegitimizing political stands he does not like. But Patsy Sims, writing in The New York Times, noted:

"The underlying ideology that links the individual groups, Mr. Stern says, is a shared conviction that the United States is being taken over by outside forces with the help of Government insiders. In this scenario, militia members see gun control as the first step in an elaborate plot to take away their weapons, then their rights and finally their freedom."

In December 2019, Stern, who contributed to the original draft of the International Holocaust Remembrance Alliance's (IHRA) Working Definition of Antisemitism, expressed concern that right-wing Jewish groups and national governments were using the document to silence what he regarded as legitimate criticisms of Israel. Stern also claimed that the US President Donald Trump's 2019 Executive Order on Combating Anti-Semitism would stifle Palestinian free speech rather than protecting Jewish students. In December 2020, Stern urged the incoming Biden administration not to adopt the IHRA Working Definition, claiming that it had been weaponized by pro-Israel lobby groups to silence criticism of Zionism.

== See also ==
- Hate studies
- Universities and antisemitism

== Publications ==
Books

- Holocaust Denial (New York: American Jewish Committee, 1993) ISBN 978-0-87495-102-8
- Loud Hawk: The United States Versus the American Indian Movement (1994) University of Oklahoma Press, 2002: ISBN 0-8061-3439-9
- The Force Upon the Plain: The American Militia Movement and the Politics of Hate (Simon & Schuster, 1996) (University of Oklahoma Press, 1997: ISBN 0-8061-2926-3)
- Antisemitism Today: How It Is the Same, How It Is Different and How to Fight It (American Jewish Committee, 2006): ISBN 978-0-87495-140-0

Articles and other publication

- Skinheads: Who They Are and What to Do When They Come to Town (The American Jewish Committee, 1990)
- Anti-Zionism, the Sophisticated Anti-Semitism (AJC, 1990).
- on Campus: A Planned Response, 1990
- Dr. Jeffries and the anti-Semitic branch of the Afrocentrism movement, 1991
- David Duke: A Nazi in politics, 1991
- Hate on talk radio, 1991
- Politics and bigotry, 1992
- Farrakhan and Jews in the 1990s (AJC, 1992, 1994).
- Crown Heights: A case study in anti-Semitism and community relations, 1992
- Demjanjuk: An analysis of the Sixth Circuit Court of Appeals decision in Demjanjuk v. Petrovsky, et al., 1993
- Liberators: A background report, 1993
- Militias, a growing danger (An American Jewish Committee background report, 1995)
- A Force Upon the Plain: The American Militia Movement and the Politics of Hate, 1996
- The McVeigh trial 1997
- Militias and the religious right Freedom Writer, October 1996. (Institute for First Amendment Studies, 1998)
- Hate and the Internet (AJC)
- Lying About the Holocaust (SPLC Intelligence Report, Fall 2001)
- Why Campus Anti-Israel Activity Flunks Bigotry 101
- Getting to the root of hate in a challenging world Seattle Times. March 16, 2004
- The Minister For Hate (The Nation of Islam and Louis Farrakhan). Published in J.O.I.N. Australia/Israel Review, 1998. Also at
- Holocaust education alone won't stop hate. Jewish SF. January 26, 2007. Also at Jewish United Fund 404 Error,
- About Monitoring and Law Enforcement, Not Education (jewishexponent.com) February 1, 2007
- Antisemitism Today: How It Is the Same, How It is Different, and How to Fight It
- Anti-Semitism Matters
- Hate Matters A condensed version of Stern's keynote speech at the First Conference to Establish the Academic Field of Hate Studies
- The Dangerous "A" Words
- Don't Avoid Conflicts, Mine Them.
