= LCHR =

LCHR may refer to:

- Latvian Centre for Human Rights, a non-governmental organization
- Lowcountry Highrollers, an American roller derby league
- lutropin/choriogonadotropin receptor, a transmembrane receptor
