= Antisemitism Awareness Act =

2024 United States bill

Antisemitism Awareness Act of 2023
- Long title: To provide for the consideration of a definition of antisemitism set forth by the International Holocaust Remembrance Alliance for the enforcement of Federal antidiscrimination laws concerning education programs or activities, and for other purposes.
- Announced in: the 118th United States Congress

Codification
- Acts amended: Title VI of the Civil Rights Act of 1964

Legislative history
- Passed the House on 1 May 2024 (320 - 91)

The Antisemitism Awareness Act, spearheaded by the Republicans but also backed by many Democrats, passed the United States House of Representatives in a 320–91 vote on 1 May 2024, and proceeded to the Senate. The bill is intended to add the IHRA definition- International Holocaust Remembrance Alliance's approved working definition of antisemitism to title VI of the Civil Rights Act of 1964, which prohibits "exclusion from participation in, denial of benefits of, and discrimination under federally assisted programs on ground of race, color, or national origin". Democratic representative Sara Jacobs, who is Jewish, said she opposed the bill because "it fails to effectively address the very real rise of antisemitism, all while defunding colleges and universities across the country and punishing many, if not all, of the non-violent protestors speaking out against the Israeli military’s conduct."

== Responses ==
Organizations including the Anti-Defamation League and Conference of Presidents have praised the bill. The Jewish Federations of North America support the bill and the adoption of the IHRA definition to help combat the increasing levels of antisemitism.

The Act has been criticized by a group of Palestinian and Arab academics, journalists and intellectuals for conflating "Judaism with Zionism in assuming that all Jews are Zionists". It faced strong opposition from several Democratic lawmakers, Jewish organizations, and free speech advocates, including more than 800 Jewish U.S. academics, who signed a letter calling on Biden not to sign the bill. Jeremy Ben-Ami, president of the centrist pro-Israel group J Street, said that his organization opposes the bill because it is an "unserious" effort led by Republicans "to continually force votes that divide the Democratic caucus on an issue that shouldn’t be turned into a political football". The American Civil Liberties Union saw the bill as an attack on First Amendment rights and argues that its "overbroad" definition of antisemitism "could result in colleges and universities suppressing a wide variety of speech critical of Israel or in support of Palestinian rights in an effort to avoid investigations by the Department [of Education] and the potential loss of funding". More than 1,200 Jewish scholars petitioned President Biden not to approve the measure, arguing that it criminalizes legitimate criticism of Israel.

Some far-right Republicans have criticized the bill saying it could make antisemitic tropes attributed to the New Testament such as Jewish deicide illegal, with figures such as Marjorie Taylor Greene and Matt Gaetz chastising it as a free speech violation on that basis.

Hundreds of Israeli and international civil society organizations have opposed it saying the IHRA definition was not meant to be used as a basis for law.
