= U.S. National Strategy to Counter Antisemitism =

2023 whole-of-government strategy

On May 25, 2023, the administration of US President Joe Biden unveiled The U.S. National Strategy to Counter Antisemitism. President Biden called his administration's plan the “most ambitious and comprehensive U.S. government-led effort to fight antisemitism in American history.”

== Background ==
A number of high-profile incidents targeting the Jewish community in 2022, such as rapper Kanye West's Holocaust denial and praise of Adolf Hitler, led to increased calls for public policy actions to confront rising antisemitism in the United States. At a U.S. Senate hearing in November, FBI Director Chris Wray and Secretary of Homeland Security Alejandro Mayorkas expressed support for a national strategy to combat antisemitism. On December 5, 125 members of the U.S. House of Representatives and U.S. Senate, both Republicans and Democrats, sent a letter to President Biden calling for a whole-of-government interagency task force to confront antisemitism, led by an assistant secretary.

On December 6, Second Gentleman Doug Emhoff hosted a roundtable on antisemitism at the White House with representatives from Jewish organizations such as the United Synagogue of Conservative Judaism, American Jewish Committee, National Council of Jewish Women, Anti-Defamation League, Agudath Israel of America and the Conference of Presidents of Major American Jewish Organizations.

The White House subsequently announced on December 12 the formation of the Interagency Policy Committee on Antisemitism, Islamophobia, and Related Forms of Bias and Discrimination coordinated by the Domestic Policy Council and the United States National Security Council to "address antisemitism and other forms of religious bigotry." The group's first task would be a national strategy to combat antisemitism.

== Strategy ==
President Biden announced the release of the U.S. National Strategy to Counter Antisemitism in a videotaped address at the White House on May 25, 2023.

The plan consists of four core pillars:

- Increasing awareness and understanding of antisemitism and broadening appreciation of Jewish American heritage
- Improving safety and security for Jewish communities
- Reversing the normalization of antisemitism and countering antisemitic discrimination
- Building cross-community relationships and solidarity and collective action to counter hate

The strategy also calls for tech companies to establish zero tolerance policies for antisemitism on their platforms.

== Reception ==
Jewish organizations largely applauded the strategy. Anti-Defamation League CEO Jonathan Greenblatt was pleased that the Biden administration initiative specifically addresses antisemitism from online sources and on college campuses – and that it recognizes threats from both the far left and far right. More than thirty Jewish organizations, including AIPAC, B'nai B'rith International, and the JCC Association of North America, voiced their support of the Biden administration's plan as they remarked in a joint statement: “In an era of rising antisemitism in the U.S. and around the world, we appreciate the clarity and urgency demonstrated by the White House in releasing its National Strategy to Counter Antisemitism.”

Criticism of the plan included “muddying the water” of a single standard to define antisemitism by not only forcefully embracing the IHRA working definition of antisemitism (widely accepted by more than 40 countries), but also “welcome[ing] and appreciate[ing] the Nexus Document and note[ing] other such efforts.” Chief operating officer of the World Jewish Restitution Organization, Mark Weitzman, referred to the ambiguity of definitions as,“divert[ing] attention away from finding the problem and into debating definitions.” Criticism of the Nexus Document includes the claim that it allows individuals to conceal antisemitism through anti-Zionist tropes without facing any consequences. More than 175 Jewish groups, including the American Jewish Committee, Jewish Federations of North America, and the World Jewish Congress, crafted a letter to members of the U.N. contending that any inclusion of antisemitic definitions other than IHRA would harm efforts to combat antisemitism. Groups like StopAntisemitism.org were particularly critical of the Biden administration's inclusion of the Nexus Document as they feel it “flies in the face of the plan’s assertion that 'If we cannot name, identify, and admit a problem, we cannot begin to solve it.” Louis D. Brandeis Center founder Kenneth L. Marcus offered a mixed assessment of the plan, remarking that “It will come as a relief to some that the strategy forcefully embraces IHRA, and yet it’s disappointing that they nevertheless acknowledge and commend Nexus. Much of the language of the document is far more consistent with IHRA than with Nexus….It’s just unfortunate that they muddle what would otherwise have been a very good discussion of definitions by praising a definition inconsistent with their approach.” Brandeis Center president Alyza D. Lewin also offered a mixed assessment. She declared the plan “demonstrates that [the Biden administration] take[s] anti-Semitism seriously. . .that it's not just a Jewish problem, but one that needs to be addressed by the entire society” – yet Lewin also said the document was undermined by embracing Nexus: “Targeting Jews based on their connection to the state of Israel is just as antisemitic as targeting them based on their Sabbath observance. Both are components of their Jewish identity.

One other point of criticism aimed at the Biden administration's handling of antisemitism comes from a recent “dear colleague” letter published by U.S. Department of Education assistant secretary for civil rights Catherine E. Lhamon. While the letter itself aims to reinforce the importance of Executive Order 13899 signed by former President Trump which “reaffirms the long-standing principle that anti-Semitism and discrimination against Jews based on an individual’s race, color, or national origin may violate Title VI of the Civil Rights Act of 1964,” the letter is not an official announcement of a regulation aimed at protecting Jewish students like the administration has promised. Some seem skeptical of whether the White House intends to issue a major regulation at all, as one critic argues that this “dear colleague” letter “retreats from the White House’s longstanding commitment to issue regulations strengthening the civil rights protections of Jewish students.”

== Subsequent actions ==
In June 2023, the American Jewish Committee announced a new task force to assist the White House in the strategy's implementation.

== See also ==
- Office of the Special Envoy to Monitor and Combat Antisemitism
- Antisemitism in the United States
- Normalization of antisemitism
