= Centre for Human Rights (disambiguation) =

The Centre for Human Rights is an organisation at the University of Pretoria Faculty of Law.

Centre for Human Rights or Center for Human Rightsmay also refer to:

- Asian Centre for Human Rights
- Bahrain Centre for Human Rights
- Cambodian Center for Human Rights
- Center for Human Rights (American Bar Association), established 2001
- Latvian Centre for Human Rights
- Palestinian Centre for Human Rights
- Southern Center for Human Rights, in Atlanta, Georgia, United States

== See also ==
- Centre for Human Rights and Rehabilitation, Malawi
- European Inter-University Centre for Human Rights and Democratisation
- Ministry of Human Rights (disambiguation)
