= Alexander Pollak =

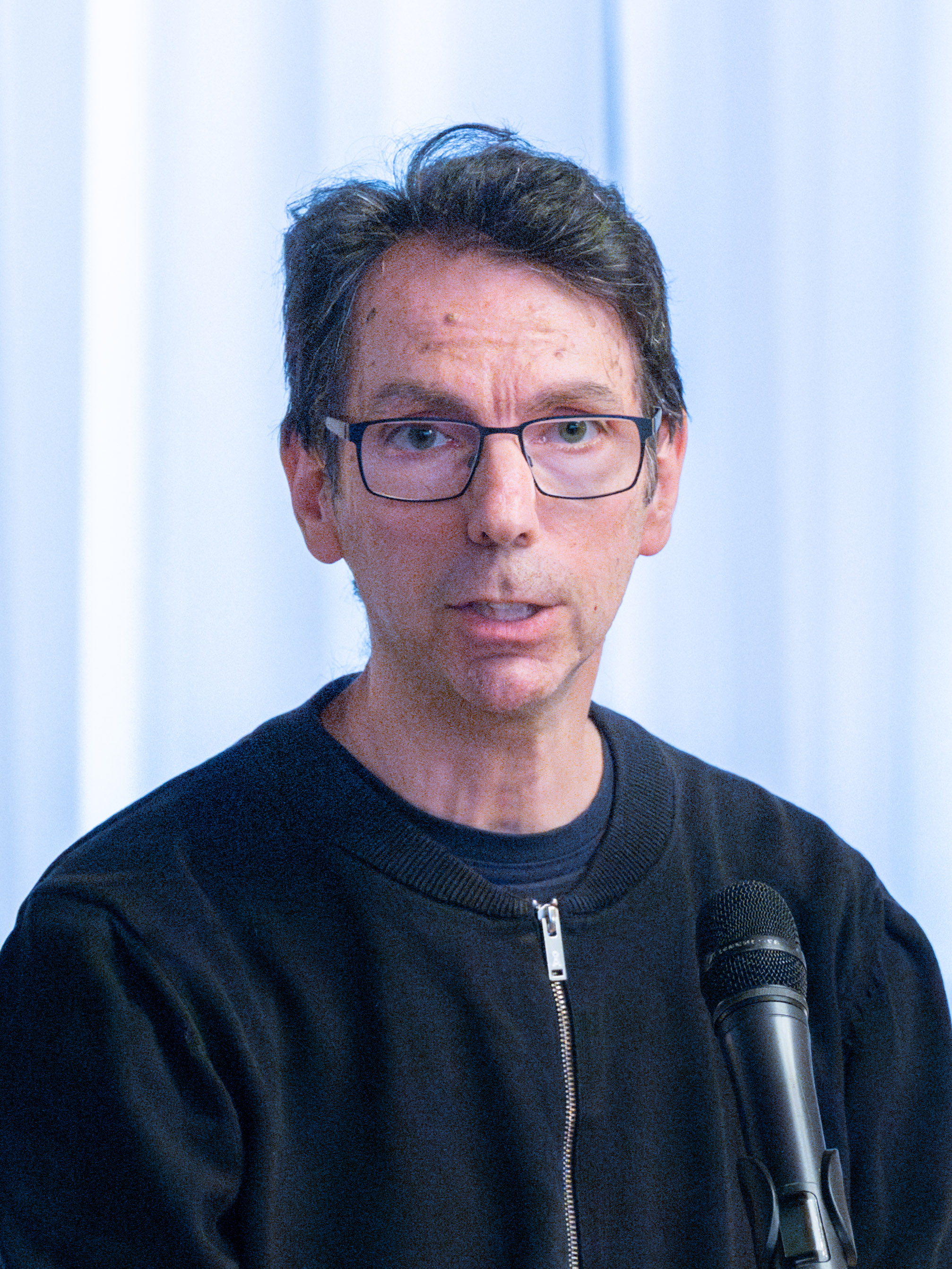
Alexander Pollak in 2026

Alexander Pollak (born July 16, 1973, in Vienna) is an Austrian historian, author and human rights campaigner.

== Biography ==
During his doctoral studies, Pollak worked on the Wittgenstein research focus "Discourse, Politics, Identity", led by the Austrian linguist Ruth Wodak. He explored the image of the Wehrmacht in newspapers and documentaries. To this end, he published a book called The Wehrmacht legend.

In 2003, he started as a radio producer at the free Viennese radio station Orange 94.0, where he designed programs for the political magazine Radio Voice. Pollak received the "Radio Prize of Adult Education" for this work.

In 2005, Pollak joined the European Monitoring Center on Racism and Xenophobia (EUMC), which in 2008 was transformed into the European Union Agency for Fundamental Rights (FRA). Pollak acted as project leader for anti-discrimination projects. In early 2011 Pollak took over the position as spokesman and co-CEO of the Austrian human rights organization SOS Mitmensch. Pollak has contributed to media reports.

Shortly before the Austrian parliamentary elections in 2013 Pollak was instrumental in supporting people without Austrian citizenship.

== Myth of the clean Wehrmacht ==
Pollak authored work that investigated how the war crimes of the Wehrmacht were covered up by the printed media in the aftermath of World War II.
