= Iddo Porat =

Israeli professor of constitutional law

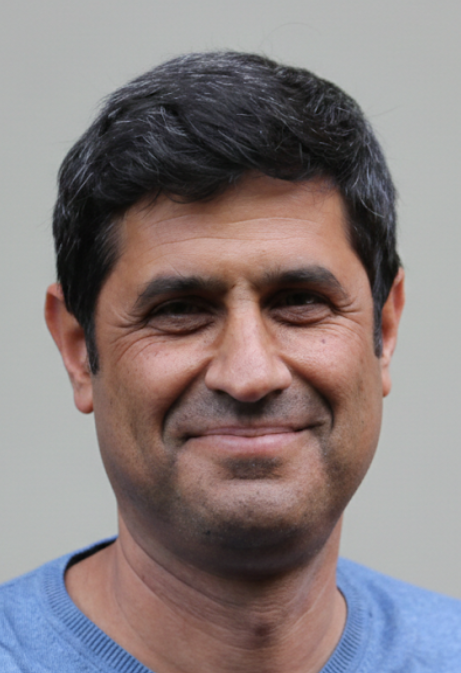
Iddo Porat

Iddo Porat (born September 15, 1970) is a full professor at the College of Law and Business Faculty of Law, Ramat Gan. He specializes in constitutional law and comparative constitutional law.

== Biography ==
Porat was born in Ramat Gan and grew up in Ramat HaSharon, the son of Colonel Yehuda Porat and Professor Dina Porat. He is a graduate of the Thelma Yellin High School of the Arts, majoring in music.

In 1998 he graduated with honors with a bachelor’s degree in law and philosophy from the Hebrew University of Jerusalem. He completed his judicial clerkship at the Supreme Court of Israel under Justice Dalia Dorner. He completed his master’s degree and PhD at Stanford University in the United States, during which time he also served as an editor of the university’s International Law Journal and as a research assistant to Professors Lawrence Friedman and Morton Horwitz. In 2004 he joined the faculty of the School of Law at the College of Law and Business.

Between 2008 and 2009 he served as a visiting professor at the University of San Diego School of Law, and between 2017 and 2018 he served as a senior fellow at the Centre for Comparative Constitutional Studies at Melbourne Law School. In 2023 he was awarded the Rockefeller Foundation Bellagio Center Residency Fellowship.

Porat teaches a yearly course at the University of Hong Kong Faculty of Law (HKU), and previously taught at the law schools of the University of Melbourne and the National University of Singapore (NUS).

Porat is married and the father of five.

== Research ==
=== Proportionality, Global Constitutionalism, and Religious Minority Rights ===
In his 2013 book Proportionality and Constitutional Culture (Cambridge University Press, with Moshe Cohen-Eliya) Porat explains that the spread of proportionality, which is part of global constitutionalism, reflects a "culture of justification," namely a culture that requires the state to justify each of its actions. The book situates the doctrine of proportionality within a historical, cultural, and political context and compares it with American balancing.

In his 2021 book Towering Judges: A Comparative Study of Constitutional Judges, (Cambridge University Press, co-edited with Rehan Abeyratne) Porat surveys the work of 19 judges from around the world who stood out in an exceptional manner in their countries. In his contribution to the book, Porat argues that the phenomenon of “towering judges” is part of the development of global constitutional law, which empowers judges as shapers of society and fosters connections among judges from different countries around the dissemination of a liberal constitutional vision.

Porat argued that global constitutionalism is characterized, inter-alia, by a Platonic Conception of constitutionalism, which views constitutional judges as attempting to get close to the objective idea of rights, regardless of its limited and flawed manifestation in the constitutional text.

In his research on restrictions imposed in Europe on ritual animal slaughter and circumcision, Porat argues that these constitute discrimination, as they target religious minorities, while comparable harms by the majority to the same interests and rights are not banned.

=== Political Polarization and Courts ===
In several articles since 2020, and in a book scheduled for publication in 2026 by Cambridge University Press (Polarization and Courts), Porat studies the impact of rising political polarization on supreme and constitutional courts. In his comparative research, Porat shows how different constitutional cultures and institutional arrangements - e.g. in the US, Germany, the UK, India, and Brazil - affect the extent to which polarization penetrates supreme and constitutional courts. He distinguishes between “mirror” polarization—where the composition of the court reflects political polarization in society—and “one-sided” polarization—where there is a clear majority for one side of the political divide within the court, not necessarily reflecting the majority in society.

According to Porat, when three conditions exist in a country, the penetration of polarization into the court will be inevitable: high political polarization, a court with broad political powers, and the absence of moderating cultural and institutional mechanisms. Porat also studied how polarization contributed to the constitutional crisis in Israel in 2023.
