= Ottawa Protocol =

The Ottawa Protocol on Combating Antisemitism is an action plan which "note and reaffirm the London Declaration on Combating Antisemitism as a template document for the fight against Antisemitism". It was developed during the second annual Conference and Summit of the Inter-parliamentary Coalition for Combating Antisemitism (ICCA) which took place in Ottawa in November, 2010, by Parliamentarians and experts from over 50 countries around the globe. It endorsed the Working Definition of Antisemitism.

== Background ==
The ICCA has brought together some 46 countries and over 250 parliamentarians from around the world to lead the fight against global Antisemitism. The ICCA's principal purpose is to share knowledge, experience and recommendations in an attempt to deal more effectively with contemporary Antisemitism (i.e. old and new antisemitism). The first annual conference of the "Inter-parliamentary Coalition for Combating Antisemitism" was held in London, England in February, 2009. Canada has hosted the second gathering of the ICCA, from November 7-9th, 2010, in Ottawa. The conference "provided the opportunity for delegates to explore data and exchange best practices to learn about the best ways to combat Antisemitism around the world". The Ottawa Protocol was the outcome of the 2010 Conference on Combating Antisemitism.

== Content ==
The protocol deals with 3 fundamental issues:

=== Concerns ===
We are concerned that, since the London Conference in February 2009, there continues to be a dramatic increase in recorded Antisemitic hate crimes and attacks targeting Jewish persons and property, and Jewish religious, educational and communal institutions. We remain alarmed by ongoing state-sanctioned genocidal Antisemitism and related extremist ideologies [...] We are appalled by the resurgence of the classic anti-Jewish libels [...] We are alarmed by the explosion of Antisemitism and hate on the Internet [...] We are concerned by the reported incidents of Antisemitism on campuses.

=== Reaffirmation ===
We renew our call for national Governments, Parliaments, international institutions, political and civic leaders, NGOs, and civil society to affirm democratic and human values, build societies based on respect and citizenship and combat any manifestations of Antisemitism and all forms of discrimination. We reaffirm the EUMC [...] working definition of Antisemitism.

=== Commitments ===
Calling on our Governments to uphold international commitments on combating Antisemitism [...] Calling on Parliaments and Governments to adopt the EUMC Working Definition of Antisemitism and anchor its enforcement in existing law [...] Encouraging countries throughout the world to establish mechanisms for reporting and monitoring on domestic and international Antisemitism [...] Encouraging the leaders of all religious faiths – represented also at this Conference – to use all means possible to combat Antisemitism and all forms of hatred and discrimination [...] Calling on the Parliamentary Forum of the Community of Democracies to make the combating of hatred and Antisemitism a priority in their work [...] Working with universities to encourage them to combat Antisemitism with the same seriousness with which they confront other forms of hate [...] Universities should use the EUMC Working Definition of Antisemitism as a basis for education, training and orientation [...] Establishing an International Task Force of Internet specialists comprised of parliamentarians and experts to create common indicators to identify and monitor Antisemitism and other manifestations of hate online and to develop policy recommendations for Governments and international frameworks to address these problems.

== Responses ==
Jason Kenney, Canada Immigration and Multiculturalism Minister, has said:

"The Ottawa Protocol complements what Canada is already doing to combat hatred and discrimination, including anti-Semitism. We are a member of the Task Force for International Cooperation on Holocaust Education, Remembrance and Research. Here at home, we have launched programs to promote integration and social cohesion of Canadians from all backgrounds."

John Baird, Canada Foreign Affairs Minister has said:

"Signing the Ottawa Protocol signals our continued commitment to leading a coordinated global effort to fight anti-Semitism. Just as Canada is moving ahead to develop and build a National Holocaust Monument in the National Capital Region, we also plan to take our commitment to parliamentarians around the world and suggest that they join us in signing the Protocol."

Professor Irwin Cotler, MP and Chair of the Inter-Parliamentary Coalition for Combating Antisemitism, said that:

"Parliamentarians normally don’t easily agree on things nor even something as compelling as antisemitism yet unanimously adopted the Ottawa Protocol to combat antisemitism. In effect what Professor Wiesel was describing, what the Ottawa Conference documented, what the Ottawa Protocol captured, what the endorsement this evening is achieving and giving expression to is a need to combat this oldest and most enduring and toxic of hatreds which regrettably is rearing its ugly head again. The protocol, the Ottawa Protocol which is being endorsed this evening by the government is not only a compelling characterization and indeed definition of antisemitism old and new but also sets forth a blueprint for action, indeed is a template for action by governments and Parliamentarians all over the world."

Kenneth L. Marcus, Director, Initiative to Combat Anti-Semitism and Anti-Israelism in America's Educational Systems, has written:

"This protocol, which was unanimously adopted by representatives of over fifty countries’ parliaments, including the U.S. Congress, will provide a critical new tool to combat resurgent campus anti-Semitism [...] What is most notable, however, is the manner in which the Protocol proposes that government and university leaders address campus anti-Semitism, i.e., by naming and condemning it with the same specificity used in other instances of hate and racism."
