= Roni Stauber =

Israeli historian (born 1961)

Roni Strauber
- רוני שטאובר
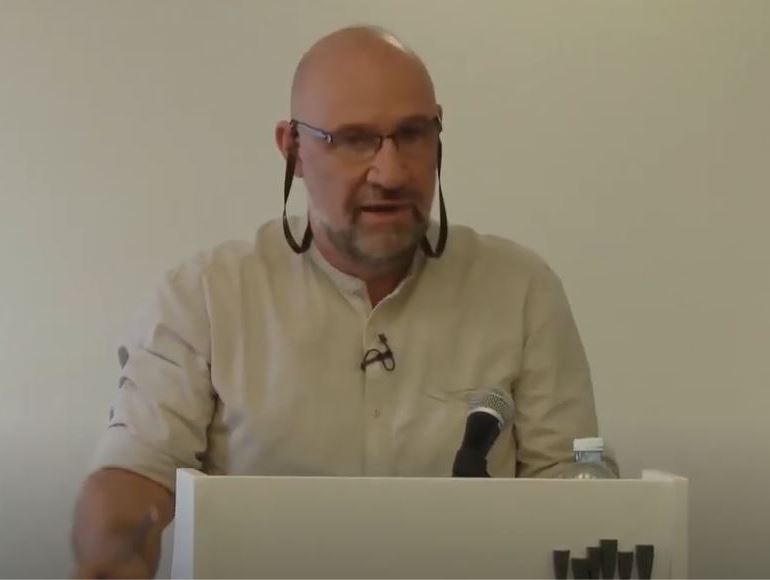
- Born: July 25, 1961 (age 65)
- Occupation: Professor

Academic background
- Education: Tel Aviv University
- Doctoral advisor: Dina Porat

Academic work
- Discipline: History
- Sub-discipline: Jewish history
- Institutions: Tel Aviv University

Roni Stauber (Hebrew: רוני שטאובר; born July 25, 1961) is an Israeli historian. He is an associate professor in the Department of Jewish History at Tel Aviv University. Stauber serves as the director of the Goldstein-Goren Diaspora Research Center and the director of the university's Diploma Program in Archival and Information Science. Stauber is also a member of the academic committee of Yad Vashem. His research focuses on various aspects of Holocaust memory and the formation of Holocaust consciousness in Israel and around the world. In particular, he examines the interrelations between ideology and politics, and between collective memory and historiography, with a focus on Israeli-German relations.

== Academic career ==
Roni Stauber completed three degrees at Tel Aviv University. His doctoral dissertation, supervised by Prof. Dina Porat, discussed the initiatives of the first Israeli governments and the ideological movements to commemorate the Holocaust in Israel in its formative years. During the 1990s he served as the academic coordinator of the Stephen Roth Institute for the Study of Modern Antisemitism, which Prof. Dina Porat and he established. In 2008 he received tenure as a member of the Faculty of Humanities. For two years, 2007–2009, he served as a visiting professor in the Department of Jewish Studies at Rutgers University. From 2012 to 2021, he served as the Academic Head of the Wiener Library for the Nazi Era and the Holocaust, as well as chair of the Library's academic committee.

Stauber's research focuses on various aspects of Holocaust memory and the formation of Holocaust consciousness in Israel and worldwide. In particular, he examines the interrelations between ideology and politics, on the one hand, and collective memory and historiography, on the other. Over the past decade, he has dealt primarily with the complex Jewish-German relations in the wake of the Holocaust. Among the books that he has written and edited: Lesson for this Generation (Jerusalem, 2000, Ish-Shalom Award for best academic book in the field of Israeli History); The Holocaust in Israeli Public Debate in the 1950s: Ideology and Memory,(London/Portland, OR, 2007); Laying the Foundations for Holocaust Research – The Impact of Philip Friedman (Jerusalem, 2009); The Roma – A Minority in Europe: Historical, Political and Social Perspectives (New York, 2007); Collaboration with the Nazis: Public Discourse after the Holocaust (London, 2010); Holocaust and Antisemitism: Research and Public Discourse, Yad Vashem and Tel Aviv University, 2015.

== Published works ==
=== Books and monographs ===
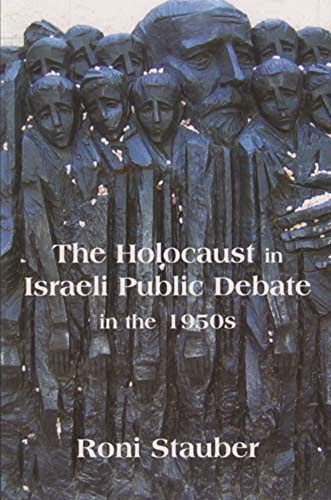
The Holocaust in Israeli Public Debate in the 1950s: Ideology and Memory

- Diplomacy in the Shadow of Memory: Past and Present in Israeli-West German Relations, 1953–1965 (Forthcoming by Yad Vashem and the Zalman Shazar Center).
- A Lesson for this Generation—Holocaust and Heroism in Israeli Public Discourse in the 1950, Yad Ben-Zvi Press and Ben-Gurion Research Center Sede Boker Campus, University of the Negev Press, Jerusalem, 2000.
- The Holocaust in the Israeli Public Debate in the 1950s, Valentine Mitchell, London, 2007.
- Laying The Foundations for Holocaust Research: The Impact of the Historian Philip Friedman, Yad Vashem, Jerusalem, 2009.
- From Revisionism to Holocaust Denial - David Irving as a Case Study, Jerusalem: Institute for the World Jewish Congress, 2000.

=== Edited books ===
- Anti-Semitism and Terror (eds. D. Porat and R.Stauber) (Tel Aviv University, 2003).
- R. Stauber and R. Vago (eds.), The Roma - A Minority in Europe Historical, Political and Social Perspectives (Budapest-New York: Central European University Press, 2007).
- Collaborations with the Nazis – Collective Memory and Public Discourse (London 2011).
- Holocaust and Antisemitism Research and Public Discourse: Essays Presented in Honor of Dina Porat, 2015 (eds. R. Stauber, E. Webman, A. Halamish).

=== Articles ===
- "The Controversy in the Political Press over the Kasztner Trial" (Heb.), Zionism 13 (1988), pp. 219–246.
- "The Relief and Rescue Committee and the Zionist Leadership in Budapest on the Eve of Nazi Occupation" (Heb.), Zionism 16 (1991), pp. 167–189.
- "Confronting the 'Jewish Response’ During the Holocaust: Yad Vasem – A Commemorative and a Research Institute in the 1950s", Modern Judaism vol 20, no 3, October 2000, pp. 277–298.
- "Realpolitik and the Burden of the Past: Israeli Diplomacy and the 'Other Germany'", Israel Studies, vol 8, no 3 (2003), pp. 100–122.
- "Polémique sur la résistance juive pendant la Shoah: documentation et recherche en Israël dans les premières années", Revue d’Histoire de la Shoah 188 (2008), pp. 233–265.
- "The Israel Ministry of Foreign Affairs and the Debate over the Establishment of Diplomatic Relations with Germany 1953–1955" (Heb.), Yad Vashem Studies 37 (2009), pp. 153–195.
- "The Debate over the Mission of Yad Vashem as a Research Institute: The First Years", Jahrbuch des Simon-Dubnow-Instituts 11 (2012), pp. 347–366.
- "The Impact of the Sinai Campaign on Relations between Israel and West Germany", Modern Judaism 33 (2013), pp. 235–259.
- "Zwischen Erinnerungspolitik und Realpolitik: die israelische Diplomatie und das Verhältnis der Bundesrepublik zum Nationalsozialismus", Jahrbuch des Simon-Dubnow-Instituts 15 (2016), pp. 419–444.
- "Israel's Quest for Diplomatic Relations – The German-Israeli Controversy, 1955–1956”, Tel Aviver Jahrbuch für deutsche Geschichte 41 (2013), pp. 215–228.
- "Ben-Gurion and the Eichmann Trial: The Historiographical Debate", Moreshet: Journal for the Study of the Holocaust and Antisemitism 17 (2020), pp. 192–219.
- A Quest For Justice: Israelis, Germans and the Efforts to Punish Nazi Criminals, 1956-1965.
