= Hate studies =

Academic field

Hate studies is an interdisciplinary academic field focusing on the causes, effects, and prevention of manifestations of hatred, such as microaggressions, hate speech, hate crime, terrorism, and genocide, that target individuals based on hostility towards their race, religion, ethnicity, nationality, sexual orientation, gender, social class, disability, or other perceived conditions or identity categories.

== Origins ==
Hate studies developed from the civil rights movement in the United States. The interdisciplinary Institute of Hate Studies was founded at Gonzaga University, a Jesuit Catholic institution located in Spokane, Washington, and the Gonzaga Institute for Action Against Hate was founded in 1998 to "fight hate through education, research, and advocacy", as a response to growing concerns about increasing levels of hate crimes, hate groups, and online hate speech, to facilitate interdisciplinary study of the causes, effects, and prevention of hate in society. The institute began to publish the annual peer-reviewed Journal of Hate Studies in 2002, and as of 2023 Gonzaga University has hosted seven "International Conferences on Hate Studies."

Other universities have added similar courses to their curricula, and the field of hate studies has now expanded globally. In 2014 the University of Leicester launched the "Centre for Hate Studies," which grew out of the "Leicester Hate Crime Project". The centre's continuing professional development program provides training on hate crime commission, prevention, and victimization, based on academic studies, policy, and victim statements. In 2018 Bard College founded the Bard Center for the Study of Hate, with Kenneth Stern as its director.

Since 2013, the International Network for Hate Studies (INHS) has arranged a global forum for academics, policy experts, and practitioners to share knowledge and research findings about hate crime and related issues. Their website states that the study of hate "needs a multi-disciplinary and international focus as well as one which examines local and jurisdiction-specific causes and responses." The Network hosts an online blog, an online library for researchers, and various collaborative workshops, and organizes an international conference every two years, the first of which occurred in 2014 at the University of Sussex School of Law.

In 2014, Palgrave Macmillan began to publish the "Palgrave Hate Studies Series".

== Scope ==
Kenneth Stern, an American attorney and an author, defines hate studies as "inquiries into the human capacity to define, and then dehumanize or demonize, an 'other', and the processes which inform and give expression to, or can curtail, control or combat, that capacity." Hate studies is an interdisciplinary field, with a scope which is not fully agreed or defined, but includes the study of hostility towards identity categories based on race (racism), culture (cultural racism), religion (Islamophobia and antisemitism), ethnicity, and nationality (xenophobia), socio-economic class (classism), and sex and gender identity (homophobia and transphobia).

Elizabeth Thweat states that defining hate itself presents difficulties. She argues that "its scope is so broad that it touches almost all aspects of life and it dwells within the hearts and minds of each one of us" and its core feature is a "devaluation of the other."

In A continuum of hate: delimiting the field of hate studies, Jennifer Schweppe and Barbara Perry describe a "continua of hate" from the 'banal' to the 'barbaric', including microaggressions, hate speech, hate crime, terrorism, and genocide, and the interplay between these concepts. The authors point out several common features of all of these actions; they are based on victims' identities; they reinforce the marginality of their victims; they do harm to their victims; and the victims are collective. In all except the case of microaggressions, these concepts are legally defined in most Western countries.

However, not all Western countries agree as to what hate is, the relationship between hate speech and hate crime, the appropriateness of censorial interventions and sanctions, and many other important issues. Strossen has hailed Hate Studies for its non-censorial approach to addressing hate.

== Interdisciplinarity ==
Stern states that "various disciplines need to be integrated and cross-pollinated" in hate studies, and provides an analysis of some of the academic fields he considers relevant:

- History - for providing a general framework for understanding the historical development of ideologies, the societal origins of hate, and to provide analysis of various events that 'trigger' hostilities between groups. Stern also states that history is often abused to promote hatred, by misrepresenting historical events, as in the case of Holocaust denial.
- Psychology - Stern states that evolutionary psychology supports the idea that most people are capable of hatred. Psychology is important, Stern argues, because it focuses on why some individuals manifest hatred, for example in the form of racism, and also why others act to fight against hatred.
- Social psychology - Stern argues that social psychology, which studies individual psychology in social situations, offers insights by demonstrating that hatred is more easily generated when people are in a group, causing individuals to lose "individualization."
- Sociology - provides a framework for the study of the behaviour of groups. Group hate is described as a process involving, for example, identification and labelling of an 'enemy', thus providing a group with a shared 'mythology' and helping to reinforce their sense of group identity. Stern points out that a person may hate abstract groups, but not specific individuals who belong to that group, and observes that not all group prejudices operate in the same way.
- Religious studies - Stern notes that religion has been used to justify "barbaric carnage", and that the intersection of religion with hatred "can be most dangerous when theology and ideology are combined." Stern notes the interaction between religion, government, and education in some states such as Saudi Arabia routinely promotes hatred. Stern suggests that how government institutions deal with religion is increasingly important, and "something in which an integrated field of hate studies could make a major contribution."
- Political science - Stern points out that hate has often been used to accomplish political goals. Stern suggests that political considerations may set limits on our ability to confront hate, and may take precedence over morality, or even law enforcement, by allowing hate crimes to occur for political reasons.
- Law - Stern discusses the utility of hate crime legislation, which may provide estimates of the number of hate crimes and justify harsher sentences on criminals who target victims based on race, religion, disability, sex, or sexual orientation. He notes the limitations of relying on the legal system as a solution to social problems.
- Journalism - Stern discusses the impact of media coverage of hate groups on public opinion, and suggests that journalists should be trained in hate studies, to improve their reporting and educate the general public.
- Stern also mentions the importance of philosophy, biology, anthropology, economics, and education.

== Sources ==
- Strossen, Nadine (2018). HATE: Why We Should Resist It with Free Speech, Not Censorship. Oxford University Press. ISBN 9780190859121.
- Critchlow, George (2002). "Preface". Journal of Hate Studies. 1 (1): 1–3. doi:10.33972/jhs.1. ISSN 2169-7442.
- Thweatt, Elizabeth (2002). "Bibliography of Hate Materials". Journal of Hate Studies. 1 (1): 167–239. doi:10.33972/jhs.6. ISSN 2169-7442.
- Stern, Kenneth S. (2004). "The Need for an Interdisciplinary Field of Hate Studies". Journal of Hate Studies. 3 (1): 7–35. doi:10.33972/jhs.18. ISSN 2169-7442.
- Schweppe, Jennifer (2016). The Globalisation of Hate: Internationalising Hate Crime?. Oxford University Press Australia & New Zealand. ISBN 9780198785668.
- Chakraborti, Neil (2016). "Mind the Gap! Making Stronger Connections Between Hate Crime Policy and Scholarship". Criminal Justice Policy Review. 27 (6): 577–589. doi:10.1177/0887403415599641. hdl:2381/32765. ISSN 0887-4034. S2CID 147773634.
- Schweppe, Jennifer (2021). "A continuum of hate: delimiting the field of hate studies". Crime, Law and Social Change. 77 (5): 503–528. doi:10.1007/s10611-021-09978-7. hdl:10344/10805. ISSN 0925-4994. S2CID 244060647.
- James, Zoë (2022). "Critical hate studies: A new perspective". International Review of Victimology. 28 (1): 92–108. doi:10.1177/02697580211037854. hdl:10026.1/17373. ISSN 0269-7580. S2CID 239675049.
- Brudholm, Thomas (2018). Hate, politics, law : critical perspectives on combating hate. Oxford [UK]. ISBN 978-0-19-046556-8. OCLC 1029783386.
- Ziaulhaq, M (2021). "Hate Studies: The Urgency and Its Developments in the Perspective of Religious Studies". Jurnal Aristo (Social, Politic, Humaniora). 9 (2): 375–395.
- Gonzaga University News Service (2022). "New name for Gonzaga institute: Center for the Study of Hate | Gonzaga University". www.gonzaga.edu.
