= Ministry of Human Rights =

Ministry of Human Rights may refer to:

- Ministry of Human Rights (Brazil)
- Ministry of Human Rights (Indonesia)
- Ministry of Human Rights (Iraq)
- Ministry of Human Rights (Pakistan)
- Ministry of Human Rights (Somalia)

== See also ==
- Centre for Human Rights (disambiguation)
