= Civil rights (disambiguation) =

Civil rights are a class of rights.

Civil rights may also refer to:

- Legal rights
- Civil rights movement, the social movement in the United States
- Civil rights, rights which can be exercised in civil law

== See also ==
- Civil liberties in the United States
