= Latvian Centre for Human Rights =

Organization based in Riga, Latvia

- Latvijas Cilvēktiesību centrs
- Abbreviation: LCHS
- Formation: 1993; 33 years ago
- Director: Anhelita Kamenska
- Website: humanrights.org.lv

The Latvian Centre for Human Rights (LCHR; Latvian: Latvijas Cilvēktiesību centrs) is a non-governmental organization which seeks to promote human rights in Latvia, founded in 1993. Its director, as of 2018, is Anhelita Kamenska (earlier heads of the centre were Nils Muižnieks and Ilze Brands Kehris).

== History ==
The LCHR was founded in 1993. It was known as the Latvian Centre for Human Rights and Ethnic Studies (LCHRES) until 2005.

== Activities and international affiliation ==
Areas of LCHR activities include social integration, closed institutions, legal assistance in human rights cases, tolerance and anti-discrimination (LCHR is a National Focal Point of EU FRA's project RAXEN) and mental disability advocacy (LCHR is member of European Coalition for Community Living). Besides, LCHR was a member of the International Helsinki Federation for Human Rights. Since 2006 LCHR is a member of International Network Against Cyberhate (INACH).

== Awards ==
In May 1998, LCHRES has received the EU-US Democracy and Civil Society Award. In 2003, LCHRES has got the first Van der Stoel award, awarded in recognition of extraordinary and outstanding achievements aimed at improving the position of national minorities by a jury chaired by the OSCE High Commissioner on National Minorities.
