= Human Rights League =

Human Rights League or League for Human Rights may refer to:

- Libyan League for Human Rights
- Tunisian Human Rights League (LTDH)
- German League for Human Rights
- Human Rights League (Dutch-speaking Belgium)
- Human Rights League (France)
- Human Rights League (French-speaking Belgium)
- International Federation of Human Rights (FIDH), established 1922, headquartered in Paris
- International League for Human Rights (ILHR), founded in 1942, based in New York
- International League for Human Rights (Berlin), founded in 1959, based in Berlin
