= All-Party Parliamentary Group Against Antisemitism =

UK parliamentary group

The All-Party Parliamentary Group Against Antisemitism is a group in the Parliament of the United Kingdom. The group exists to "To combat antisemitism and help develop and seek implementation of effective public policy to combat antisemitism". After the 2024 general election, the group's chair is Joani Reid MP (Labour) and the vice-chairs are the MPs Christine Jardine (Liberal Democrat), David Pinto-Duschinsky (Labour) and Saqib Bhatti (Conservative). Secretariat to the group is provided by the PCAA Foundation.

The group commissioned the All-Party Parliamentary Inquiry into Antisemitism in 2005. The inquiry panel, chaired by former Europe Minister Denis MacShane, gathered written and oral evidence on antisemitism in Britain and published a report of their findings on 7 September 2006. The panel's recommendations included improved reporting and recording of antisemitic attacks; a crackdown on anti-Jewish activity on university campuses; and improved international co-operation to prevent the spread of racist material online.

In 2012, Labour MP John Mann commissioned an all-party parliamentary inquiry into electoral conduct, based on a recommendation from the antisemitism report of 2006. That inquiry panel was chaired by Natascha Engel and its report was published in October 2013. The Labour government responded to the inquiry twice and the Coalition government has since responded for a third time.

The Antisemitism Policy Trust acts as the Group's secretariat.
