= Dina Porat =

Israeli historian (born 1943)

- דינה פורת
- Born: September 24, 1943 (age 82); Buenos Aires, Argentina
- Education: Tel Aviv University (PhD, 1984)
- Occupation: Historian
- Employer: Tel Aviv University
- Known for: History of the Holocaust
- Title: Alfred P. Slaner Chair

Dina Porat (born 24 September 1943) is the academic advisor and former chief historian of Yad Vashem, Professor Emerita in the Department of Jewish History at Tel Aviv University, where she also served as head of the Kantor Center for the Study of Contemporary European Jewry, and as holder of the Alfred P. Slaner Chair for the Study of Antisemitism and Racism.

== Biography ==
Dina Porat was born in Buenos Aires, Argentina, and immigrated to Israel in 1950. Her father, Moshe Kostirinsky-Kitron, born in Telechan near Pinsk, was the founding father of the "Dror-Habonim" youth movement in South America and one of the leaders of Argentinian Jewry. Her mother, Ruth née Gold, was born in Raczki (or Ratzki) in the Suwalki area, Lithuania.

Porat completed her master’s degree with highest distinction in 1973. Her master’s thesis was titled "The Concentration of Jewish Refugees in Vilna, 1939–1941: Efforts at Departure." She received her doctorate in 1984 from the School of Jewish Studies at Tel Aviv University, written under the supervision of Prof. Daniel Carpi, on the topic: "The Role of the Jewish Agency Executive in Jerusalem in the Efforts to Rescue European Jewry, 1942–1945."

Porat held various positions at Tel Aviv University: Head of the Chaim Rosenberg School of Jewish Studies (2004–2008), Head of the Department of Jewish History (2000–2003), and Head of the Stephen Roth Institute for the Study of Antisemitism and Racism (1998–2010). She has held the Alfred P. Slaner Chair for the Study of Antisemitism and Racism since 1997 and served as Head of the Kantor Center for the Study of Contemporary European Jewry (2010–2021). She served as Chief Historian of Yad Vashem (2011–2022) and has since served as its academic advisor.

In 1985 Porat was a research fellow at the Institute for Advanced Studies at the Hebrew University of Jerusalem; she served as a researcher at the Center for Israel and Jewish Studies at Columbia University (1987–1988), and at the seminar of the International Institute for Holocaust Research at Yad Vashem (1995–1996). She was a visiting professor at centers for European Studies and Jewish Studies at Harvard University in 1999, at New York University in 2004, at the Shoah Memorial Institute in Paris (October 2007), and at the International University of Venice (autumn 2008). She was selected Outstanding Lecturer of the Faculty of Humanities for the year 2004, received the Wallenberg Medal in 2012, was included in TheMarker’s list of the 50 leading researchers in Israel for 2013, and in Forbes’ list of the 50 most influential women in Israel for 2018. In 2015 her colleagues and students published a jubilee volume in her honor. In 2025 she received the title of Honorary Fellow from the Academic College of Tel Aviv-Yaffo and the Presidential Medal of Honor of the State of Israel.

She has supervised more than 30 master’s theses and 20 doctoral dissertations. Her works have been cited approximately 13,000 times in academic literature (as of 2026).

She filled the role of Prof. Yehuda Bauer as academic advisor to the International Holocaust Remembrance Alliance (2005–2010) and participated in several international United Nations conferences, including the Durban Conference in September 2001.

In 2018 she provided advice regarding the joint declaration of the prime ministers of Israel and Poland, which was widely criticized. According to her, she was asked to give personal advice on the declaration and did not act in her capacity as Chief Historian of Yad Vashem.

== Awards and Honors ==
In 2010 she received the US Jewish Book Council Prize for the biography she wrote of Abba Kovner, published by Stanford University Press.

In 2018 she received the Bahat Prize for Best Original Research Manuscript for her book To Me Belongeth Vengeance and Recompense: The Yishuv, the Holocaust, and Abba Kovner’s Avengers Group, about the attempt to take revenge on the Germans.

In 2025 she received the Israeli Presidential Medal of honor for outstanding contribution to the society and the state.

== Personal life ==
She is married to Lieutenant Colonel (Rsv.) Yehuda Porat, and they have three sons and eleven grandchildren. Their son Iddo Porat is a professor of law.

== Major books ==
- Dina Porat (introduction by Saul Friedlander), The Blue and the Yellow Star of David: the Zionist Leadership in Palestine and the Holocaust, 1939-1945. Cambridge, Mass. Harvard University Press, 1990.
- Dina Porat, The Fall of a Sparrow: The Life and Times of Abba Kovner, Elizabeth Yuval (Translator). Stanford University Press, 2009.
- Dina Porat, Israeli Society, the Holocaust and Its Survivors, Vallentine Mitchell, 2008.
- Dina Porat, Roncalli and the Jews during the Holocaust, Concern and Efforts to help, Search and Research, Yad Vashem, 2014. with David Bankir, English and Hebrew.
- Dina Porat, Nakam, the Holocaust Survivors who sought full-scale revenge, Stanford University Press, 2023.
