= Executive Order 13899 =

Executive order announced by U.S. President Donald Trump

CAS
- Combating Anti-Semitism
- Number: 13899
- President: Donald Trump
- Signed: December 11, 2019

Federal Register details
- Federal Register document number: 2019-27217
- Publication date: December 11, 2019

The Executive Order on Combating Anti-Semitism, officially Executive Order 13899, is an executive order announced on December 10, 2019, and signed the next day by U.S. President Donald Trump. The said purpose of the order was to prevent antisemitism by making it easier to use laws which prohibit institutional discrimination against people based on race, color or national origin to punish discrimination against Jewish people, including opposition to Israel uniquely as a Jewish nation-state (the right of a Jewish country to exist) without opposition to other nation-states. The definition of antisemitism used in the executive order was written by the Holocaust Remembrance Alliance and has been criticised as conflating it with criticism of Zionism or the state of Israel.

== Background ==
According to the executive order, cases of antisemitism had increased since 2013. A 2006 report by the United States Commission on Civil Rights (USCCR) had found that antisemitism persisted on college campuses. In the recommendations of the report, the USCCR called for the Office for Civil Rights to vigorously enforce Title VI against recipients that deny equal educational opportunities to all students.

=== Anti-Semitism Acts of 2018 and 2019 ===
The executive order which Trump announced on December 10, 2019, and signed December 11, 2019 followed the introduction of two acts in Congress – the Anti-Semitism Awareness Act of 2018 and the Anti-Semitism Awareness Act of 2019. These bills aimed to broaden the definition of antisemitism in attempts to enable its enforcement as a Title VI violation. These acts were controversial at their times of introduction in Congress, prompting the American Civil Liberties Union (ACLU) to write a letter opposing the initial bill from 2018. In the letter, the ACLU argued that the definition of antisemitism used in the bill extended to criticism of Israel and Zionism, thus limiting free speech.

== Antisemitism definition used ==
The definition of antisemitism which is used in the executive order was written by the International Holocaust Remembrance Alliance (IHRA), which defines it as, "...a certain perception of Jews, which may be expressed as hatred toward Jews. Rhetorical and physical manifestations of anti-Semitism are directed toward Jewish or non-Jewish individuals and/or their property, toward Jewish community institutions and religious facilities."

CNN reported that a White House official had indicated that the order would define Judaism as a nationality rather than a religion in the United States, but the order which was ultimately released did not contain this definition of Judaism. The new order neither defined Judaism as a nationality nor did it define Judaism as an ethnicity, nor did it change the way in which complaints of Title VI of the Civil Rights Act of 1964 violations are handled. The order does not mean that all antisemitic incidents can be classified as a Title VI violation, it only specifies that the Office for Civil Rights must review incidents to determine if they should be enforced under Title VI.

== Reception ==
The order set off a firestorm of criticism among many Jewish and Palestinian leaders. Some American Jews praised the order, while others objected to defining Judaism as a nationality (as the order was initially indicated to do, though it ultimately did not), claiming that "Trump's reclassification of Judaism mirrored sentiments used by white nationalists and Nazi Germany" and that "the move appears to question whether Jews are really American". Some decried the order as a political stunt, and called on Trump to more directly address the threat of white nationalism. Groups such as the Anti-Defamation League, the Republican Jewish Coalition, and the Orthodox Union were supportive of the order.

Kenneth S. Stern, one of the authors of the IHRA definition, claimed that the executive order, which emphasizes antisemitism in academic settings, is "an attack on academic freedom and free speech".

== Trump and antisemitism ==
Throughout his first presidency, Donald Trump was accused of antisemitism numerous times. In a speech at the Israeli-American Council in 2019, Trump referenced classic antisemitic tropes in his appeal to Jewish voters. Discourse around Trump's relationship with Judaism in America was revived later in his presidency. In October 2022, Trump called for American Jews to "appreciate Israel before it's too late", aligning with his past claims that American Jews no longer love Israel.

== See also ==
- Antisemitism in the United States
- History of antisemitism in the United States
- List of executive orders in the first presidency of Donald Trump
- Executive Order 14188
