= International Holocaust Remembrance Alliance =

Intergovernmental organization

- Member states in dark blue and purple as of Jan 2025
- Founder: Göran Persson
- Type: Intergovernmental organization
- Purpose: Uniting governments and experts to strengthen, advance and promote Holocaust education, remembrance and research worldwide and to uphold the commitments to the 2000 Stockholm Declaration
- Headquarters: Berlin, Germany
- Members: 35 countries
- Website: www.holocaustremembrance.com
- Formerly called: Task Force for International Cooperation on Holocaust Education, Remembrance, and Research

The International Holocaust Remembrance Alliance (IHRA), until January 2013 known as the Task Force for International Cooperation on Holocaust Education, Remembrance, and Research or ITF, is an intergovernmental organization founded in 1998 which unites governments and experts to strengthen, advance and promote Holocaust education, research and remembrance worldwide and to uphold the commitments of the Declaration of the Stockholm International Forum on the Holocaust. The IHRA has 34 member countries, one liaison country and seven observer countries.

The organization was founded by then-prime minister of Sweden Göran Persson in 1998. From 26–28 January 2000, the Stockholm International Forum on the Holocaust was held, bringing together high-ranking political leaders and officials from more than forty countries to meet with civic and religious leaders, survivors, educators, and historians. Nobel Prize laureate Elie Wiesel served as the Forum's honorary Chairman and Professor Yehuda Bauer was the senior Academic Advisor to the forum.

The IHRA carries out internal projects, seeks to influence public-policy making on Holocaust-related issues and develops research focusing on lesser known aspects of the Holocaust. The IHRA adopted the Working Definition of Antisemitism in 2016 and has since promoted it. The IHRA has faced criticism that this definition conflates criticism of Israel or of Zionism with antisemitism.

== Background ==
Following a survey in 1997 which revealed that many school children lacked knowledge about the Holocaust, and also affected by his personal experience of visiting the site of the former Neuengamme concentration camp near Hamburg, Swedish prime minister Göran Persson decided to launch a debate in parliament about Holocaust education in Sweden. This resulted in the Swedish information campaign entitled Levande Historia (Living History). Realizing that 'the fight against ignorance about the Holocaust called for an international partnership' Persson also approached US president Bill Clinton and UK prime minister Tony Blair for their support in establishing an international organization to support Holocaust education, remembrance, and research worldwide.

== History ==
The IHRA was founded in 1998 by Persson as the Task Force for International Cooperation on Holocaust Education, Remembrance, and Research (ITF). Its first meeting took place in May 1998. Holocaust scholar Yehuda Bauer took on the role of academic advisor. In 1998, Germany and Israel joined the initiative, followed in 1999 by the Netherlands, Poland, France, and Italy.

In 2013, ITF changed its name to the International Holocaust Remembrance Alliance (IHRA). The logo of the IHRA, also adopted in 2013, was designed by the renowned architect, Daniel Libeskind.

=== The Stockholm International Forum on the Holocaust ===
During 26–28 January 2000, the Stockholm International Forum on the Holocaust was held to mark the 55th anniversary of the liberation of Auschwitz on 27 January 1945. It was attended by historians, politicians, and heads of state from 45 countries. Yehuda Bauer was invited to head the academic committee, while Nobel Prize Laureate Professor Elie Wiesel was asked to become the Honorary Chairman of the Forum. A joint declaration, the Stockholm Declaration, was unanimously adopted. As German sociologist Helmut Dubiel notes, the conference "took place in an atmosphere informed by right-wing violence and spectacular success of rightist parties at the voting polls. Nonetheless, the end of the millennium and the anniversary of Auschwitz constituted a reference point for the foundation of a transnational union for struggle against genocide."

Following the initial Forum on the Holocaust, the Stockholm International Forum Conferences were convened a further three times on the topics of Combatting Intolerance 2001; Truth Justice and Reconciliation 2002; Preventing Genocide 2004.

==== The Declaration of the Stockholm International Forum on the Holocaust ====
The declaration (not to be confused with the 1972 Stockholm Declaration adopted by the UN) is the founding document of the IHRA. It consists of eight paragraphs, which emphasize the importance of education, remembrance and research about the Holocaust.

With humanity still scarred by genocide, ethnic cleansing, racism, antisemitism and xenophobia, the international community shares a solemn responsibility to fight those evils. Together we must uphold the terrible truth of the Holocaust against those who deny it. We must strengthen the moral commitment of our peoples, and the political commitment of our governments, to ensure that future generations can understand the causes of the Holocaust and reflect upon its consequences.

— Paragraph 3, Declaration of the Stockholm International Forum on the Holocaust

The declaration advocates the need to uphold the "terrible truth of the Holocaust against those who deny it," and to preserve the memory of the Holocaust as a "touchstone in our understanding of the human capacity for good and evil." According to the declaration, "the international community shares a solemn responsibility to fight" against "genocide, ethnic cleansing, racism, antisemitism and xenophobia".

=== Working Definition of Antisemitism ===
In 2016, IHRA adopted the Working Definition of Antisemitism, first published by the EUMC in 2005. IHRA adopted the Working Definition of Antisemitism at a plenary session in 2016. On 1 June 2017, the European Parliament voted to adopt a resolution calling on European Union member states and their institutions to adopt and apply the definition. The non-legally binding working definition includes illustrative examples of antisemitism to guide the IHRA in its work. These examples include classical antisemitic tropes, Holocaust denial and attempts to apply a double standard to the State of Israel. Numerous governmental and other organizations have adopted the IHRA definition. However, the working definition has been criticised by some as too broad, and conflating anti-Zionism with antisemitism.

In the United States, President Trump used the definition 2018 in his Executive Order 13899, and the Biden administration launched a comprehensive strategy May 25, 2023 to counter anti-Semitism, which included the IHRA working definition.

In January 2025, the IHRA definition played a central role in a legal settlement involving Harvard University. The settlement resolved a dispute over alleged discrimination linked to the university's adoption and use of the IHRA definition. The settlement highlights the continuing impact and debate surrounding the implementation of the IHRA definition in institutional policies.

Adaptation of the IHRA Working Definition of Antisemitism by country
| Country | Status | Date of adaptation |
|---|---|---|
| Dominican Republic | | 24 August 2026 |
| Albania | | 22 October 2020 |
| Argentina | Member | 4 June 2020 |
| Australia | Member | 13 October 2021 |
| Austria | Member | 25 April 2017 |
| Belgium | Member | 14 December 2018 |
| Bosnia and Herzegovina | Observer | 22 July 2022 |
| Bulgaria | Member | 18 October 2017 |
| Canada | Member | 27 June 2019 |
| Colombia | | 2 June 2022 |
| Croatia | Member | 20 January 2023 |
| Cyprus | Observer | 18 December 2019 |
| Czech Republic | Member | 25 January 2019 |
| Denmark | Member | January 2022 |
| Estonia | Member | 29 April 2021 |
| Finland | Member | 17 February 2022 |
| France | Member | 3 December 2019 |
| Germany | Member | 20 September 2017 |
| Greece | Member | 8 November 2019 |
| Guatemala | | 27 January 2021 |
| Hungary | Member | 18 February 2019 |
| Ireland | Member | 16 January 2025 |
| Israel | Member | 22 January 2017 |
| Italy | Member | 17 January 2020 |
| Kosovo | | 8 June 2023 |
| Latvia | Member | 11 April 2023 |
| Lithuania | Member | 24 January 2018 |
| Luxembourg | Member | 10 July 2019 |
| Moldova | Observer | 18 January 2019 |
| Netherlands | Member | 27 November 2018 |
| North Macedonia | Member | 6 March 2018 |
| Panama | | 10 May 2023 |
| Philippines | | 18 February 2022 |
| Poland | Member | 13 October 2021 |
| Portugal | Member | 28 July 2021 |
| Romania | Member | 25 May 2017 |
| Serbia | Member | 26 February 2020 |
| Slovakia | Member | 28 November 2018 |
| Slovenia | Member | 20 December 2018 |
| South Korea | | 4 August 2021 |
| Spain | Member | 22 July 2020 |
| Sweden | Member | 21 January 2020 |
| Switzerland | Member | 4 June 2021 |
| United Kingdom | Member | 12 December 2016 |
| United States | Member | 11 December 2019 |
| Uruguay | Observer | 27 January 2020 |

== Organization ==
The IHRA chairmanship rotates annually among member countries. The chair hosts the IHRA Plenary meetings up to twice a year in their country. Each country organizes and pays for the meetings taking place in the year of its chairmanship. The chair was held by Italy in 2018, Luxembourg in 2019, Germany in 2020 and Greece in 2021.

The IHRA Permanent Office (PO) was established on 11 March 2008 in Berlin, Germany. The secretary general of the IHRA is Michaela Küchler, who heads the PO.

=== Working groups ===
Academic Working Group (AWG)

The Academic Working Group (AWG) is concerned with promoting Holocaust research, increasing accessibility to, and organizing research into, archives, and encouraging international cooperation on research and scholarship. The AWG was instrumental in opening the International Tracing Service archives in Bad Arolson, which contains some 70 million pages of documents relating to the fate of over 17 million victims of World War II.

Memorials and Museums Working Group (MMWG)

The Memorials and Museums Working Group (MMWG) helps mobilize support and expertise for Holocaust memorials and related places of memory, it collects information on memorials and promotes communication and exchange between memorial sites and museums. The MMWG drafted an International Memorial and Museum Charter. The IHRA was also instrumental in campaigning against the destruction of the site of the former Gusen Concentration Camp in Austria, which will now be preserved as a memorial.

=== International partnerships ===
Currently the organization has seven permanent international partner organizations, which hold the status of observers within the IHRA: United Nations, UNESCO, OSCE/ODIHR, International Tracing Service (ITS), European Union Agency for Fundamental Rights (FRA), Council of Europe, and the Claims Conference.

The IHRA formalized its relations with the Council of Europe and with the Organization for Security and Co-operation in Europe's Office for Democratic Institutions and Human Rights in 2010.

== Membership ==
=== Member countries ===
Countries that are members, liaisons, and observers of the IHRA, and the adoption of the Working definition of antisemitism at the national level.: Member countries that adopt the Working definition of antisemitism / Member countries that have not adopted the Working definition of antisemitism; Observer and liaison countries that adopt the Working definition of antisemitism / Observer and liaison countries that have not adopted the Working definition of antisemitism; Countries which adopt the Working definition of antisemitism but are not member, observer or liaison countries

IHRA Member countries 18 November 2022
| Member country | Year joined |
|---|---|
| Argentina | 2002 |
| Australia | 2019 |
| Austria | 2001 |
| Belgium | 2005 |
| Bulgaria | 2018 |
| Canada | 2009 |
| Croatia | 2005 |
| Czech Republic | 2002 |
| Denmark | 2004 |
| Estonia | 2007 |
| Finland | 2010 |
| France | 1999 |
| Germany | 1998 |
| Greece | 2005 |
| Hungary | 2002 |
| Ireland | 2011 |
| Israel | 1998 |
| Italy | 1999 |
| Latvia | 2004 |
| Lithuania | 2002 |
| Luxembourg | 2003 |
| Netherlands | 1999 |
| North Macedonia | 2021 |
| Norway | 2003 |
| Poland | 1999 |
| Portugal | 2019 |
| Romania | 2004 |
| Serbia | 2011 |
| Slovakia | 2005 |
| Slovenia | 2011 |
| Spain | 2008 |
| Sweden | 1998 |
| Switzerland | 2004 |
| United Kingdom | 1998 |
| United States | 1998 |

The government of any UN member country may apply for IHRA membership. Subject to approval by the Plenary, the applicant will initially be accepted as an Observer country, and may participate as such in the Working Groups and the Plenary. The candidate country should establish a Holocaust Memorial Day (on January 27, or another date chosen by the applicant country). The government should also demonstrate a clear public policy commitment to Holocaust education at a senior political level, and must satisfy the IHRA that its archives dealing with the Holocaust period (1933-1950) are open for research and that there is or will be academic, educational, and public examination of the country's historical past during the Holocaust period.

=== Observer and liaison countries ===
Countries that apply for membership of IHRA are initially accepted as Observers, subject to approval by the Plenary, and participate as such in the Working Groups and the Plenary.

Observer and liaison countries
| Country | Status |
|---|---|
| Bosnia and Herzegovina | Observer |
| Cyprus | Observer |
| Malta | Observer |
| Moldova | Observer |
| Monaco | Observer |
| New Zealand | Observer |
| Uruguay | Observer |

On 24 June 2022, New Zealand joined IHRA as an observer. While the announcement was welcomed by the New Zealand Jewish Council and the Holocaust Centre of New Zealand as a means of combating racism and anti-Semitism, Palestine Solidarity Network Aotearoa chairman John Minto claimed that adopting the IHRA definition would silence criticism of Israeli human rights abuses against the Palestinians. Brazil joined the organization as an observer member in 2021, but withdrew in 2025.

== Responses ==
=== The Norwegian chairmanship and Knut Hamsun ===
The IHRA faced criticism from a number of public and academic Jewish groups and personalities in relation to the Norwegian chairmanship of 2009. The chairmanship coincided with a controversial decision by Norway to commemorate the 150th anniversary of the birth of Knut Hamsun, the Nobel Prize–winning Norwegian author and later Nazi sympathizer. Dr. Manfred Gerstenfeld, Chairman of the Jerusalem Center for Public Affairs, challenged Norway's chairmanship of the IHRA, arguing that "this country is unfit to hold such a position when in the same year it has held major memorial activities for the Nazi-admirer Hamsun."

On 20 July 2009, the Norwegian IHRA Chair published a statement rejecting the accusations against it, and promising to continue the IHRA's efforts to combat antisemitism and promote Holocaust education.

In an article for Israeli newspaper The Jerusalem Post, Yehuda Bauer defended the Norwegian chairmanship. Bauer emphasized Norway's commitment to Holocaust education, while also acknowledging the continuing presence of antisemitism in Norway and elsewhere:

The arguments against Norway would be more credible if the Norwegians did not admit that there is antisemitism in Norway, that they ignored or wanted to bury Hamsun's pro-Nazi stand or that they hampered the IHRA's work in fighting antisemitism in any way. Not only is none of this true, but it was the Norwegian chairman that, before this controversy exploded, insisted on including the fight against antisemitism as a central component in the IHRA's immediate future program − the proposal was accepted by acclamation.

=== The IHRA and the Holy See ===
In 2009, the Vatican withdrew from a written agreement to join the IHRA (then the ITF) as observer member. On 21 December 2010, The Guardian reported on leaked US diplomatic cables in which Julieta Valls Noyes, a diplomat working at the American embassy in the Vatican, suggested the withdrawal might be due to the "relatively inexperienced" foreign minister Ettore Balestrero, or to concerns about "ITF pressure to declassify records from the WWII-era pontificate of Pope Pius XII", who had been criticized for his failure to publicly denounce the Holocaust. The Guardian suggested the publication of the materials—some of which had been declassified years earlier—may have stalled following the death of Pope John Paul II, who had wished to canonize Pius XII, leaving only six to eight archivists working to catalogue the Vatican's 16 million documents. According to the cable, IHRA representatives "expressed considerable disappointment" about the Vatican's reluctance to join.

On 2 March 2020, the Holy See officially opened the Vatican Apostolic Archive, covering material from Pius XII's tenure (1939–1958). Commending the change of Vatican policy, the IHRA Chair, Ambassador Georges Santer, said: "Archival access is a key aspect of Holocaust remembrance, and contributes directly to safeguarding the historical record. We all share a responsibility to throw light on the still obscured shadows of the Holocaust and the Second World War, and we very much appreciate the constructive talks we had in the past with Cardinal State Secretary, Pietro Parolin, and Secretary for Relations with States, Archbishop Paul Richard Gallagher."
