= Fundamental Rights Agency =

Agency of the European Union

European Union Agency for Fundamental Rights

Agency overview
- Formed: 15 February 2007 (regulation adopted); 1 March 2007 (inaugurated)
- Jurisdiction: European Union
- Headquarters: Schwarzenbergplatz 11; A-1040 Vienna; Austria; 48.198179°N 16.374628°E
- Agency executive: Sirpa Rautio, Director
- Key document: Council Regulation (EC) No 168/2007
- Website: fra.europa.eu

The European Union Agency for Fundamental Rights, usually known in English as the Fundamental Rights Agency (FRA), is a Vienna-based agency of the European Union inaugurated on 1 March 2007. It was established by Council Regulation (EC) No 168/2007 of 15 February 2007. FRA provides independent evidence-based advice to EU institutions and Member States on fundamental rights issues. Its thematic areas include equality and non-discrimination, racism, asylum and migration, data protection, access to justice, and the rights of children and persons with disabilities.

== Mandate ==
The FRA is an EU body tasked with "collecting and analysing data on fundamental rights with reference to, in principle, all rights listed in the Charter"; however, it is intended to focus particularly on "the thematic areas within the scope of EU law".

The Agency formerly worked under five-year thematic multiannual frameworks. Council Regulation (EU) 2022/555 discontinued that system in favour of an annually adopted programming document. The same regulation extended the Agency's scope to police cooperation and judicial cooperation in criminal matters, while excluding the Common Foreign and Security Policy.

The FRA's primary methods of operation are surveys, reports, provision of expert assistance to EU bodies, member states, and EU candidate countries and potential candidate countries, and raising awareness about fundamental rights. The FRA is not mandated to intervene in individual cases but rather to investigate broad issues and trends.

== History ==
The FRA was established in 2007 as the successor to the European Monitoring Centre on Racism and Xenophobia (EUMC), which was also based in Vienna. The EUMC's mandate was narrower than that of the FRA, as it was restricted to issues of racism and xenophobia.

The EUMC grew from the Commission on Racism and Xenophobia (CRX), established in 1994, and also known as the Kahn Commission. The CRX was transformed into the EUMC in June 1998; officially established by Council Regulation (EC) No 1035/97 of 2 June 1997.

The need for a new human rights institution was questioned given that human rights policy was a principal concern of the Council of Europe (CoE), of which all EU member states were also members. In 2007 the British Conservative MEP Syed Kamall said: "The Fundamental Rights Agency will take £20m (30m euros) of taxpayers' money and use it to advance a partisan agenda with little accountability to anyone". In 2010 the German newspaper Die Welt reported that the centre-right French politician Pierre Lellouche, then EU minister in the Sarkozy government, questioned "the added value" of the FRA when the Council of Europe already took care of human rights.

== Publications and surveys ==
Since its inception, the FRA has carried out surveys and published reports which are available online. A full list of publications is given on Publications & resources > Publications. This section discusses reports that have seen significant attention from outside observers.

=== Survey: Violence against Women ===
In March 2014, FRA published a major survey on violence against women, based on face-to-face interviews with over 42,000 women from across the 28 Member States of the EU. The survey asked about their experiences of physical, sexual and psychological violence including incidents of intimate partner violence ('domestic violence'). Questions also asked about incidents of stalking, sexual harassment and online harassment as well as their experience of violence in childhood.

According to the survey, key findings included:

- 33% of women had experienced physical and/or sexual violence since the age of 15;
- 22% had experienced physical and/or sexual violence by a partner;
- 5% had been raped, and;
- 33% had childhood experiences of physical or sexual violence at the hands of an adult.

=== Lithuanian Law on the Protection of Minors ===
In September 2009 the EP adopted a resolution condemning a "Law on the Protection of Minors", which was then under discussion in Lithuania, as "homophobic" and requested the FRA to issue a legal opinion on whether the draft law was compatible with the EU Charter of Fundamental Rights. The Lithuanian Parliament responded by adopting a resolution that condemned the EP's resolution as an "illegal act" (pointing to the fact that the FRA explicitly has no mandate to examine the legislation adopted by Member States) and requesting the Lithuanian Government to take legal action against the EP before the European Court of Justice.

=== Survey: EU-MIDIS (Minorities and Discrimination) ===
In 2009, FRA released a survey on the experiences of discrimination, racist crime, and policing of minority group and immigration groups in the EU. The survey was based on the responses of 23,000 individuals from selected ethnic minority and immigrant groups, and additionally, 5,000 people from the majority population living in the same areas as minorities in 10 Member States. Key findings of the survey include that:

- 55% of respondents thought that discrimination based on ethnic origin is widespread in their country, with 37% saying that they had experienced discrimination in the past 12 months;
- 12% said they had personally experienced a racist crime in the past 12 months, however 80% did not report the incident to the police;
- Roma reported the highest levels of discrimination, with one in two respondents saying that they were discriminated against in the last 12 months, and;
- high levels of discrimination were also mentioned by Sub-Saharan Africans (41%) and North Africans (36%).

A second round of the survey (EU-MIDIS II) is currently underway, and the results will be published in 2016. This will collect comparable data, and assess the impact of national anti-discrimination and equality legislation and policies in the EU.

=== Survey: European Union lesbian, gay, bisexual and transgender survey ===
In 2013, FRA conducted an online survey to identify how lesbian, gay, bisexual and transgender (LGBT) people living in the European Union experience the fulfilment of their fundamental rights. This followed a 2009 report on homophobia and discrimination on grounds of sexual orientation or gender identity which identified the need for comparative data on this issue. The results reflect the experiences of more than 93,000 individuals who completed the online survey across Europe. The aim was to support the development of more effective laws and policies to fight discrimination, violence and harassment, improving equal treatment across society.

From the findings, it was noted that:

- 2 out of 3 LGBT respondents were hid or disguised being LGBT at school;
- 19% of respondents felt discriminated against at work or when looking for a job, despite legal protection under EU law, and;
- More than 1/4 of LGBT people who answered the survey had been attacked or threatened with violence in the last five years, while more than half of these did not report the incident.

A second round of the survey (EU-LGBTI II) is currently underway, and the results will be published in 2020

. This will collect comparable data in order to compare the results with the prior survey.

==== Methodology ====
The online survey methodology was chosen to ensure the anonymity of ‘hard-to-reach’ or ‘closeted’ LGBT populations, to encourage reporting of sensitive or negative experiences, such as criminal victimisation, and eliminate bias, which could have been introduced by telephone or face-to-face interview approaches. Multiple responses were discouraged through the length (approximately 30 minutes) and complexity of the survey, while the input process in the different countries was closely monitored for falsifications. The results are not intended to be representative of all LGBT people in the EU, but provide the largest collection of empirical evidence on the experiences of LGBT people in Europe to date. Data about the perceptions of discrimination on grounds of sexual orientation or gender identity of the general public was not included in the survey, as it is already collected by Eurobarometer. The analysis of the results in the EU LGBT survey – Main results report compares some Eurobarometer data with the EU LGBT survey results.

=== Survey: Roma ===
The Agency has a multi-annual Roma programme to allow it "to make regular reports on progress made and provide evidence based advice to the EU institutions and Member States based on data systematically collected across the EU". Data from the 2011 Roma survey is available via an online data explorer tool.

== Publications of the EUMC ==
EUMC published reports are available from the website here of the FRA, the EUMC successor agency. A selection is given below.

=== Report: Working Definition of Antisemitism ===
In 2005, the EUMC published a working definition of antisemitism, whose stated purpose was to "provide a guide for identifying incidents, collecting data and supporting the implementation and enforcement of legislation dealing with antisemitism". In November 2013 the definition was removed from the organisation's website in 'a clear-out of non-official documents'. A spokesperson stated that the document had never been viewed as a valid definition and that "We are not aware of any official definition".

=== Report: Rise in antisemitic attacks in the EU ===
In May 2004, a report labeled 'Manifestations of antisemitism in the EU 2002 – 2003' was published. It detailed a rise in attacks targeting Jewish businesses, synagogues, cemeteries and individuals. The countries with the most significant number of attacks were Belgium, France, Germany, the Netherlands and the United Kingdom. A second report, on perceptions of antisemitism, was also published.

=== Report: Rise of Islamophobic attacks in the EU following 9/11 ===
The largest monitoring project ever to be commissioned regarding Islamophobia was undertaken following 9/11 by the European Monitoring Centre on Racism and Xenophobia (EUMC).

From a total of 75 reports, 15 from each member state, a synthesis report, entitled "Summary report on Islamophobia in the EU after 11 September 2001", was published in May 2002. The report highlighted occasions in which citizens abused and sometimes violently attacked Muslims. Discrimination included verbal abuse, indiscriminately accusing Muslims of responsibility for the attacks, removing women's hijab, spitting, using the name "Usama" as a pejorative epithet, and assaults. The report concluded that "a greater receptivity towards anti-Muslim and other xenophobic ideas and sentiments has, and may well continue, to become more tolerated".

=== Annual Reports ===
FRA publishes an annual Fundamental Rights Report reviewing the state of fundamental rights across EU Member States. The 2024 report, titled "Towards a Democracy Anchored in Fundamental Rights", identified rising poverty, persistent threats to democracy, widespread racism, and challenges in the context of migration as key concerns for 2023.

The 2025 report reviewed developments in 2024, with a focus on three specific topics: fundamental rights in elections, gender-based violence, and national implementation of the [[EU Charter of Fundamental Rights]]. Among its key concerns were growing threats of online electoral manipulation, persistent violence against women, rising online hate speech, and ill-treatment of migrants at EU external borders.

=== Fundamental Rights Forum ===
FRA organises the Fundamental Rights Forum, a major biennial event bringing together policymakers, civil society, and human rights practitioners. The 2024 Forum attracted over 900 participants and featured more than 60 sessions including workshops, masterclasses, art performances, and human rights roundtables.

=== Civil Society Platform ===
FRA maintains a Fundamental Rights Platform (FRP) — a network of civil society organisations that cooperate with the Agency on thematic research, consultations, and events. Platform members receive advance information on FRA projects and are consulted annually on FRA's work programme and civic space issues.

== See also ==
- All-Party Parliamentary Group against Anti-Semitism
- Charter of Fundamental Rights of the European Union
- Committee on Civil Liberties, Justice and Home Affairs
- Committee on the Elimination of Racial Discrimination
- Committee on Women's Rights and Gender Equality
- European Commission against Racism and Intolerance
- European Commissioner for Employment, Social Affairs & Equal Opportunities
- European Commissioner for Justice, Freedom & Security
- European Court of Justice
- LGBT rights in the European Union
