= History of Zionism (1948–present) =

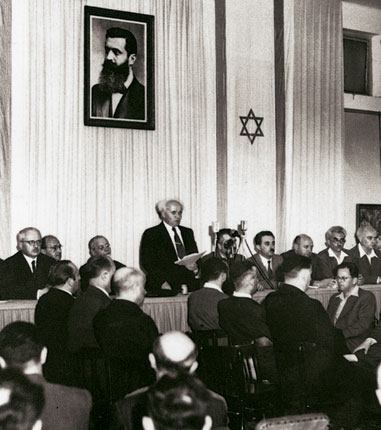
David Ben-Gurion proclaiming Israel's establishment beneath a large portrait of Theodor Herzl

As an organised nationalist movement, Zionism is generally considered to have been founded by Theodor Herzl in 1897. Herzl sought an independent Jewish state (usually defined as a secular state with a Jewish-majority population, in contrast to a theocratic Halakhic state), as expressed in his 1896 pamphlet Der Judenstaat. Though he did not live to witness it, his vision was fulfilled with the founding of the State of Israel in 1948.

The Zionist movement continues to exist in the form of various organisations working to support Israel, combat antisemitism, assist persecuted Jews, and encourage diaspora Jews to move to Israel. Most Israeli political parties continue to define themselves as Zionist.

== Background ==
As an organised nationalist movement, Zionism is generally considered to have been founded by Theodor Herzl in 1897. Herzl sought an independent Jewish state (usually defined as a secular state with a Jewish-majority population, in contrast to a theocratic Halakhic state), as expressed in his 1896 pamphlet Der Judenstaat.

Ben-Gurion declared the establishment of the state of Israel in 1948. The Declaration of Independence of Israel described a democracy with equality of social and political rights for all citizens, and extended a peace offering to neighbouring states and their Arab citizens. As a result, many Zionist institutions became government institutions, and the four Zionist militias—Haganah, Palmach, Irgun, and Lehi—were combined to form the Israel Defense Forces. Ben White noted that the declaration states equality on the basis of citizenship but not nationality. (Note: White 2012, Spot the Difference: "In Israel, '"nationality" (Hebrew: le'um) and "citizenship" (Hebrew: ezrahut) are two separate, distinct statuses, conveying different rights and responsibilities'. Palestinians in Israel, as non-Jews, can be citizens, but never nationals, and are thus denied 'rights and privileges' enjoyed by those 'who would qualify for Israeli citizenship under the 1950 Law of Return'.")

Arab offensive at the beginning of the 1948 Arab–Israeli war

With the declaration and the entry of Arab regular armies the following day, the civil war in Mandatory Palestine became a war of separate states. Ben-Gurion referred to this war as the "war of sovereignty", while the newly established Israel Defense Forces referred to it as the "war of liberation". In 1949, the Green Line borders of Israel were set in a series of armistice agreements with the countries that made up the Arab League. The demarcations set out in these armistices saw Israel taking control of 78% of Mandatory Palestine, instead of the 55% outlined in the 1947 UN partition plan. The war, remembered by Palestinians as the Nakba, resulted in the expulsion and flight of hundreds of thousands of Palestinians, the depopulation of towns and villages, and destruction of much of Palestinian society and the Arab landscape. This war, led by the Zionist Yishuv, was framed by its leaders in biblical and messianic terms as a "miraculous clearing of the land", akin to the biblical War of Joshua. Nur Masalha writes that it is not clear who the Yishuv was declaring independence from, as it was neither from the British colonial rule, which facilitated Jewish settlement against Palestinian wishes, nor from the land's indigenous inhabitants, who had long cultivated and owned it. By the end of the war, 700-800,000 Palestinians – about half of Mandatory Palestine's predominantly Arab population – were displaced in total, and hundreds of villages were destroyed. The 1948 Palestinian expulsion and flight is known in the Palestinian historiography as the Nakba ("the catastrophe").

After the 1949 Armistice Agreements, a series of laws passed by the first Israeli government prevented displaced Palestinians from claiming private property or returning on the state's territories. They and many of their descendants remain refugees supported by UNRWA.

== Zionist politics in the new state ==
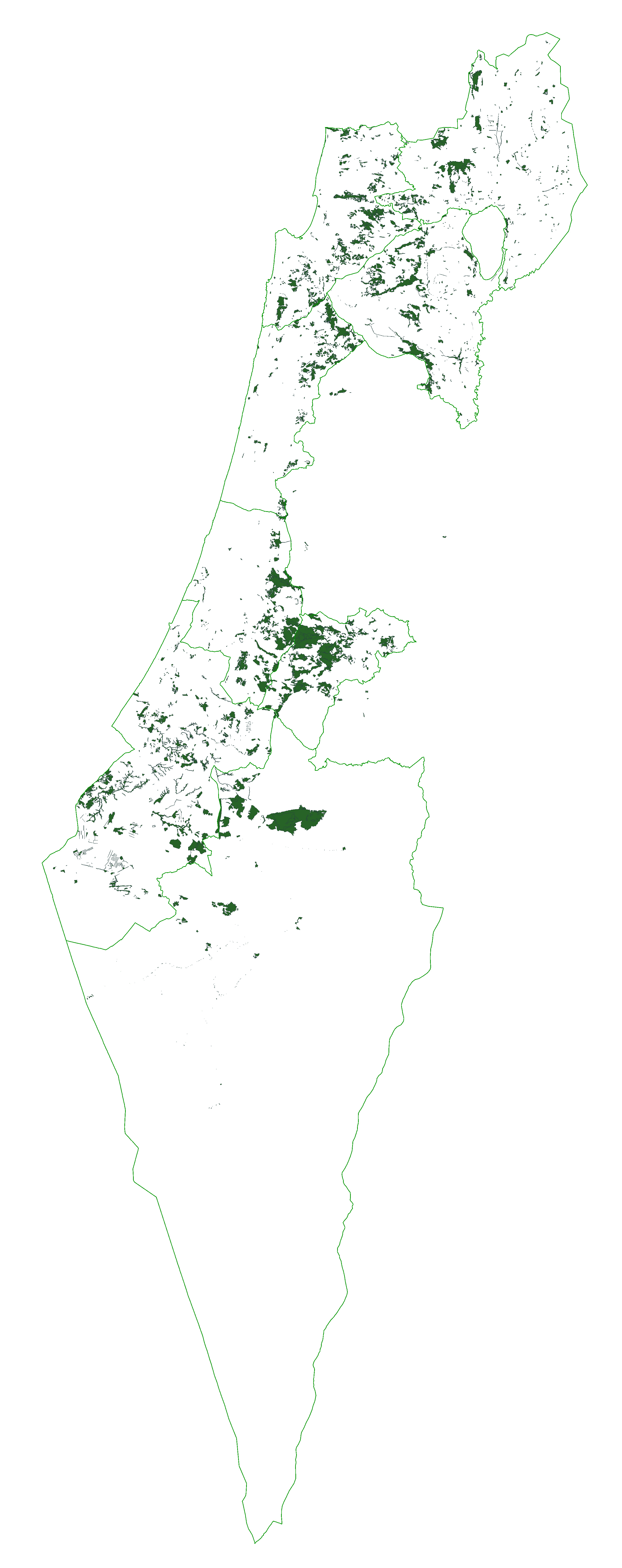
Map of afforestation by the Jewish National Fund. The afforestation project overseen by Yosef Weitz of the JNF was not only to decorate the landscape, but to cover up Palestinian villages that had been depopulated and destroyed to deter the return of Palestinian refugees.

A 120-seat parliament, the Knesset, met first in Tel Aviv, then moved to Jerusalem after the 1949 ceasefire. In January 1949, Israel held its first elections. The Socialist-Zionist parties Mapai and Mapam won the most seats (46 and 19 respectively). Mapai's leader David Ben-Gurion was appointed prime minister, and formed a coalition that did not include Mapam, who were Stalinist and loyal to the USSR (another Stalinist party, non-Zionist Maki won 4 seats). This was a significant decision because it signaled that Israel would not be in the Soviet bloc. The Knesset elected Chaim Weizmann as the first (largely ceremonial) president of Israel. Hebrew and Arabic were made the official languages of the new state. All governments have been coalitions—no party has ever won a majority in the Knesset. From 1948 until 1977 all governments were led by Mapai and the Alignment, predecessors of the Labour Party. In those years Labour Zionists, initially led by David Ben-Gurion, dominated Israeli politics and the economy was run on primarily socialist lines.

After the founding of the State of Israel, the Zionist Organization of America (ZOA) helped mobilised political support in the United States for Israel, with large scale funding and pressure on Washington and on public opinion. Emanuel Neumann and Abba Hillel Silver were two leaders of the Zionist Organization of America. They felt its massive funding legitimised taking a major role in shaping Israeli government policy and Israeli society, a minority position among members of the ZOA. They opposed the social and economic policies of Prime Minister David Ben-Gurion and his Mapai (Labour) Party, according to historian Zohar Segev. Their interventions were rejected and Israeli politicians agreed that American Zionists had a major role in funding but not in policy guidance.

In 1950 the Knesset passed the Law of Return, which granted to all Jews and those of Jewish ancestry (Jewish grandparent), and their spouses, the right to settle in Israel and gain citizenship.

Most liberal Zionists were highly supportive of this new Jewish state, which they believed was a guarantee for liberal values by fulfilling Jewish self-determination. Some, like Judah Leon Magnes and Martin Buber were critical of the methods used, including the expulsions of Palestinians, but accepted the Jewish state as a practical reality on the ground. Chaim Weizmann and Pinchas Rosen were both signatories of the Israeli Declaration of Independence, which proclaimed Israel to be a "Jewish and democratic state."

Liberal Zionists were split between the General Zionists, who opposed David Ben-Gurion's government, and Pinchas Rosen's new Progressive Party who supported it. Rosen was Israel's first Minister of Justice and repeatedly pushed for an Israeli constitution to no avail. At the same time, Chaim Weizmann, a stalwart member of the General Zionists, also served as the first President of Israel from independence in 1948 until his death in 1952.

During this time period, the Progressive Party still represented the Yekke German Jews who were part of the Fifth Aliyah while the General Zionists still tended to represent the middle class. In 1961, Rosen and Peretz Bernstein, leader of the General Zionists and another signatory of the Israeli Declaration of Independence, united their two parties to form the Israeli Liberal Party. However, by 1964, the right-leaning faction of the party was becoming dominant, seeking an alliance with the ardently right-wing Herut.

In 1956, Mizrachi, HaPoel HaMizrachi, and other religious Zionists formed the National Religious Party. The Irgun wing of the Revisionist Party formed Herut. In 1965, right-leaning liberal Zionists from the Liberal Party and revisionist Zionists from Herut formed a new party called Gahal, leaving Rosen dismayed and causing him to break away to form a new party, the Independent Liberals. In 1973 the new Likud Party was formed by a group of parties which were dominated by the Revisionist Herut/Gahal.

== Middle eastern and north African exodus ==
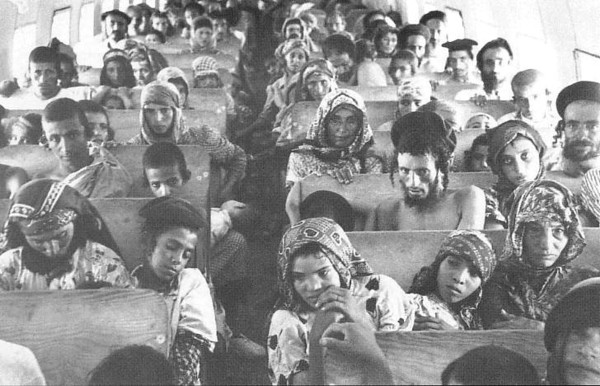
Yemenite Jews on their way to Israel during Operation Magic Carpet

Between 1948 and 1951, 250,000 Jews immigrated to Israel from Arab countries. This included 49,000 Yemenite Jews as part of Operation Magic Carpet between 16 December 1948 and 24 September 1950 In response, the Israeli government implemented policies to accommodate 600,000 immigrants over four years, doubling the country's Jewish population. Reactions in the Knesset were mixed; in addition to some Israeli officials, there were those within the Jewish Agency who opposed promoting a large-scale emigration movement among Jews whose lives were not in immediate danger.

=== Iraq ===
Initially Iraq had banned its Jewish population from emigrating to Israel, but later reversed this decision in 1951. Between 1951 and 1952, the American Jewish Joint Distribution Committee and Israel conducted Operation Ezra and Nehemiah between 120,000 and 130,000 Iraqi Jews airlifted to Israel.

=== Morocco ===
Morocco, like Iraq, also instituted a ban on migration to the newly established State of Israel, and sought to distinguish between Zionism and their local Jewish communities, but Zionist organisations continued to work clandestinely under the organisation Caisse d'Aide aux Immigrants Marocains with the support of Mossad to facilitate immigration to Israel. Subsequently agents from Mossad in discussions with representatives of Hassan II of Morocco, agreed to facilitate a large public migration operation called Operation Yachin, which ran from 1961 to 1964. During the operation, 17.9% of the Jewish population of Tangier, 77.2% from Marrakesh, and 54.5% from Casablanca were migrated to Israel, with the operation in total facilitating the migration of 97,000 Jews from Morocco.

By 1972, 600,000 Jews from Arab and Muslim countries had relocated to Israel.

== The World Zionist Organization and immigration policy ==
Since the founding of Israel, the World Zionist Organization has functioned mainly as an organisation dedicated to assisting and encouraging Jews to migrate to Israel. It has provided political support for Israel in other countries but plays little role in internal Israeli politics. The movement's major success since 1948 was in providing logistical support for Jewish migrants and refugees and, most importantly, in assisting Soviet Jews in their struggle with the authorities over the right to leave the USSR and to practice their religion in freedom, and the exodus of 850,000 Jews from the Arab world, mostly to Israel.

In 1944–1945, Ben-Gurion described the One Million Plan to foreign officials as being the "primary goal and top priority of the Zionist movement." The immigration restrictions of the British White Paper of 1939 meant that such a plan could not be put into large scale effect until the Israeli Declaration of Independence in May 1948. The new country's immigration policy had some opposition within the new Israeli government, such as those who argued that there was "no justification for organizing large-scale emigration among Jews whose lives were not in danger, particularly when the desire and motivation were not their own" as well as those who argued that the absorption process caused "undue hardship". However, the force of Ben-Gurion's influence and insistence ensured that his immigration policy was carried out.

== Hebraization of names, consolidation of modern Hebrew culture ==
As part of the effort to consolidate its new ownership over the land it had taken over in the 1948 war, the Israeli state worked towards "erasing all traces of its former owners". The project of "Hebraization" of the map, for which the JNF Naming Committee was established, aimed to replace what remained of the Arab towns and villages with newly named Israeli settlements. These names were often based on the Arab names but with a "Hebrew pronunciation" or based on old Hebrew biblical names. This effort also sought to demonstrate continuous Jewish ownership over the land to ancient times.

Prior to 1948, the Zionist movement had limited authority over the use of place names in Palestine. After 1948, the name "Palestine" was removed from Zionist organisations; for example, the Jewish Agency for Palestine, which played a critical role in the founding of the Israeli state in 1948, was renamed the "Jewish Agency for Israel".

The first works of Hebrew literature in Israel were written by immigrant authors rooted in the world and traditions of European Jewry. Yosef Haim Brenner (1881–1921) and Shmuel Yosef Agnon (1888–1970), are considered by many to be the fathers of modern Hebrew literature. Native-born writers who published their work in the 1940s and 1950s, often called the "War of Independence generation," brought a sabra mentality and culture to their writing. S. Yizhar, Moshe Shamir, Hanoch Bartov and Benjamin Tammuz vacillated between individualism and commitment to society and state.

== The Jerusalem Program and beyond ==
The Jerusalem Program was the ideological platform of the post-war Zionist movement, initially adopted in 1951 at the 23rd World Zionist Congress to replace the Basel Program. The Jerusalem Program differed from the original Basel Program in that it shifted the goals of the Zionist Movement once the State of Israel was already established. It emphasised the consolidation of the State of Israel through HeHalutz (pioneering) and Hakhshara (preparation) as well as land acquisition, agriculture and investment; the in gathering of exiles in Eretz Israel, including through Youth Aliyah; and the fostering of the unity of the Jewish people, including through Hebrew education, democracy and defense of Jewish rights. The program was amended at the 27th Zionist Congress (Jerusalem, 1968).

== Territorial expansion in the 1967 Arab–Israeli War ==
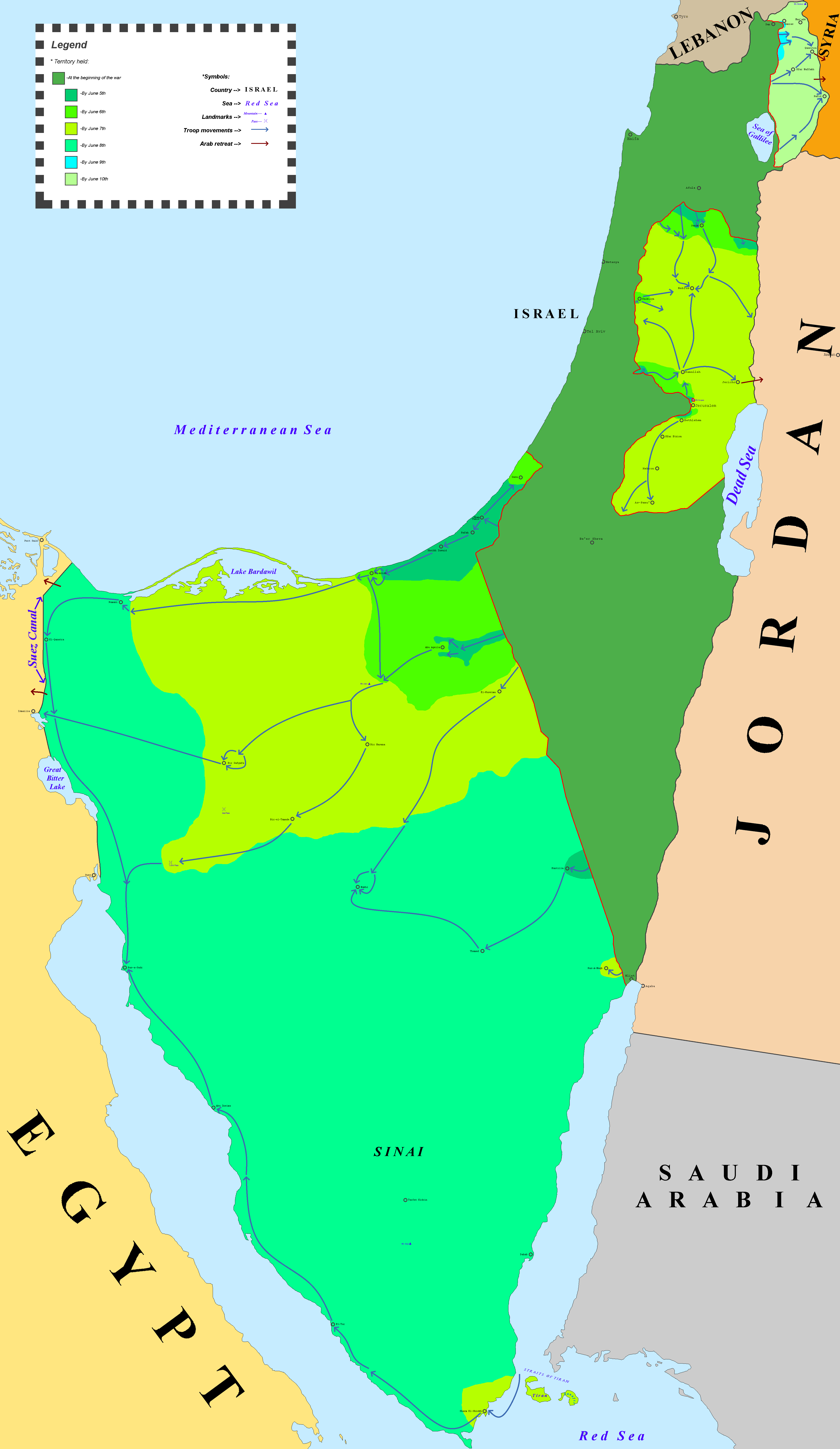
Territories under Israeli occupation following the 1967 Arab–Israeli War: the Golan Heights, the Sinai Peninsula, East Jerusalem and the West Bank, and the Gaza Strip.

In the 1967 Arab–Israeli War (5–10 June 1967) between Israel and a coalition of Arab states—primarily Egypt, Syria, and Jordan—Israel captured and occupied the West Bank (including East Jerusalem), the Gaza Strip, the Sinai Peninsula, and the Golan Heights.

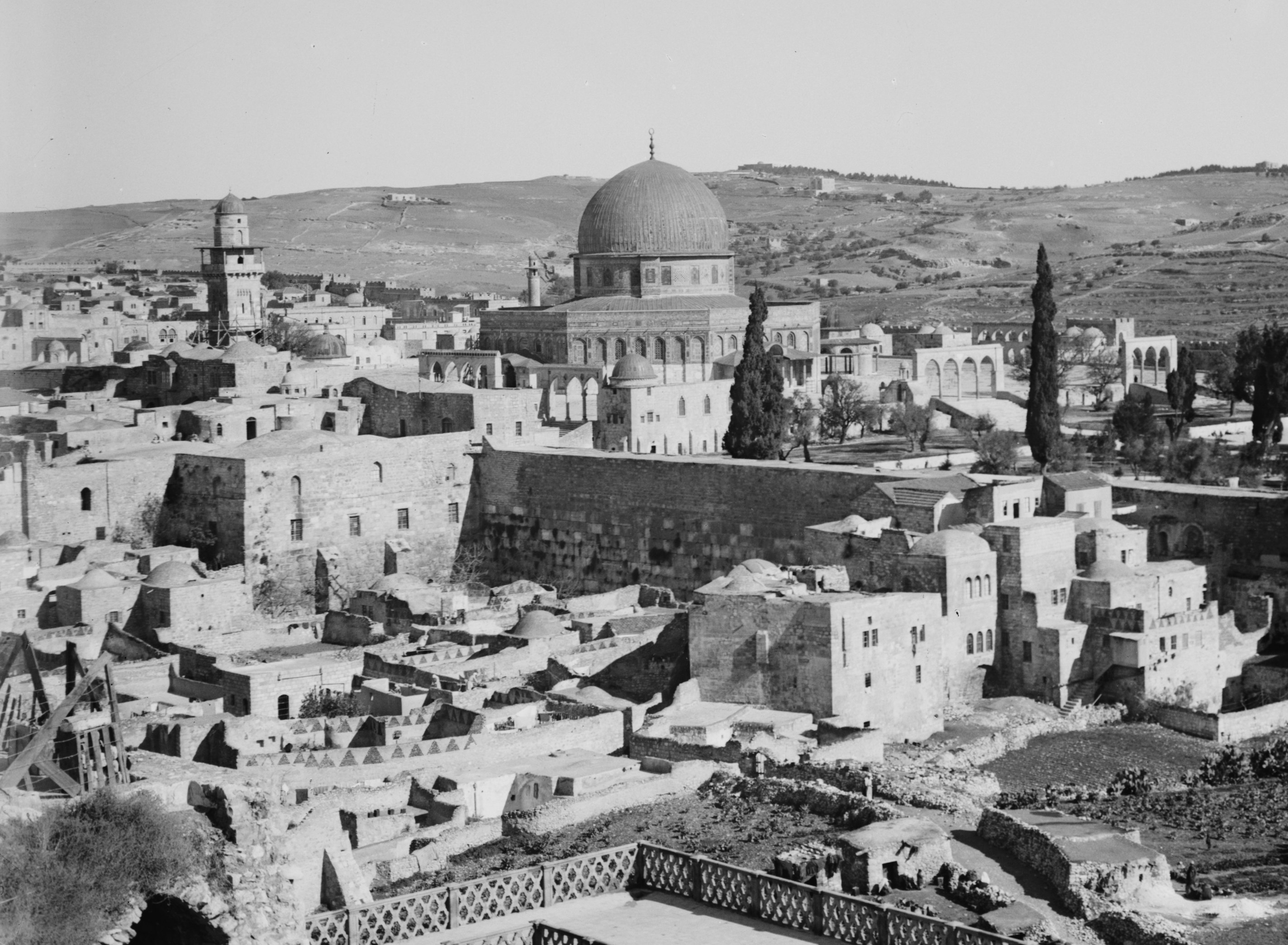
The Mughrabi Quarter beside the Western Wall.

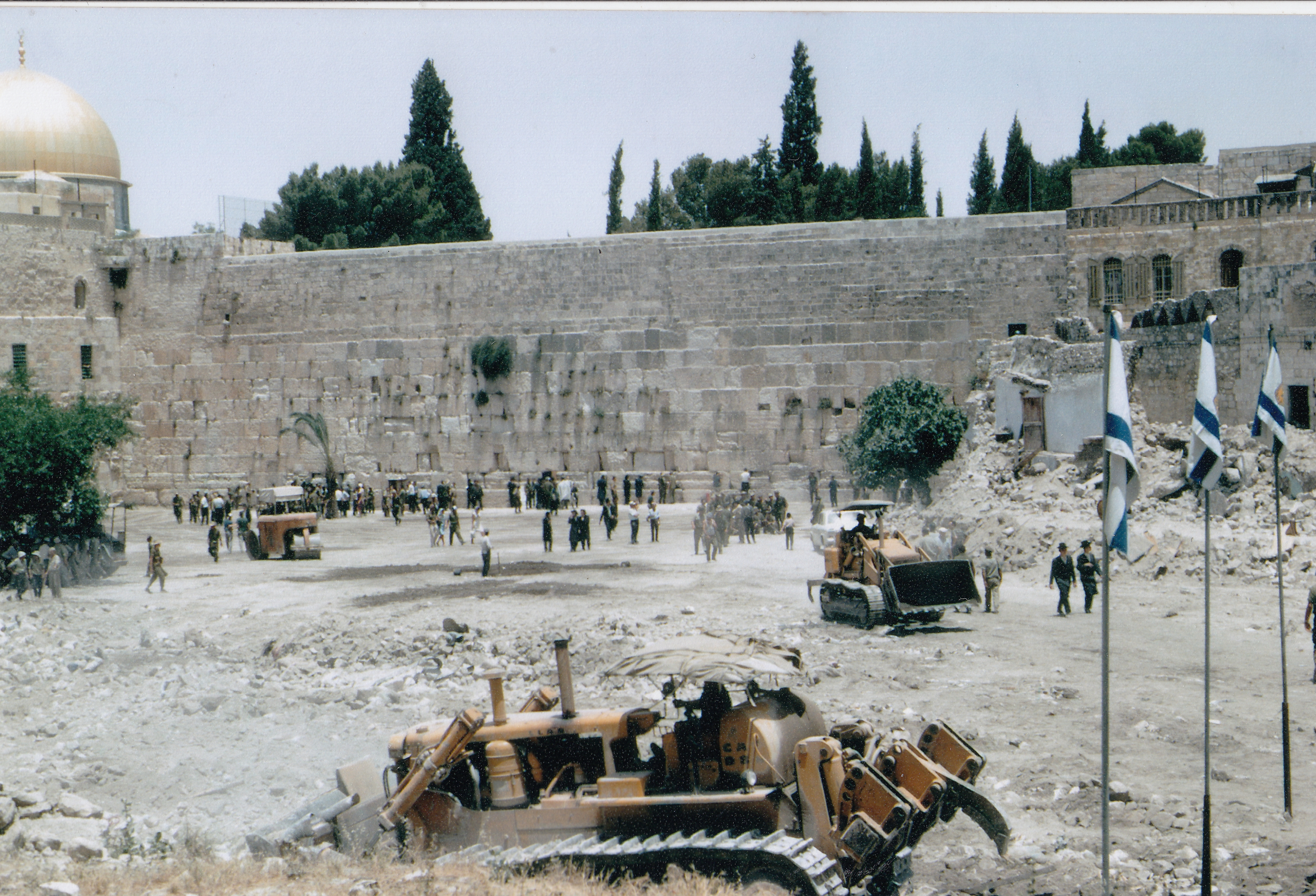
Israeli bulldozers clearing the site in 1967.

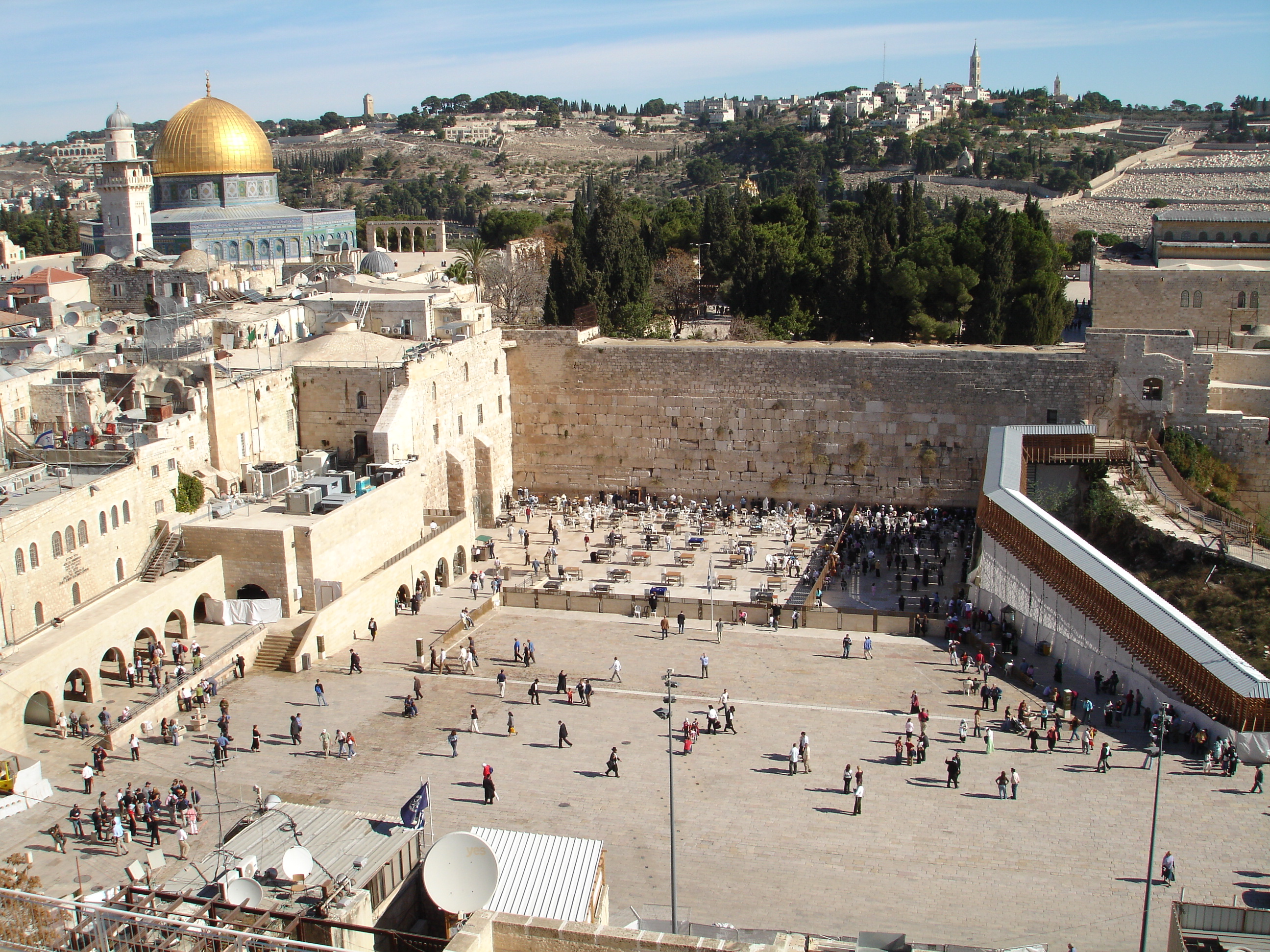
The Western Wall Plaza.

Upon Israel's occupation of the Old City of Jerusalem in the 1967 Arab-Israeli War, Israeli bulldozers cleared what had been the Mughrabi Quarter, creating the Western Wall Plaza.

After the 1967 Arab–Israeli War, the Anti-Defamation League (ADL)—with AIPAC founder Isaiah L. Kenen's support, according to Israeli historian Ilan Pappé—sought to "portray certain 'anti-Israel' actions as anti-Semitic", especially with regard to international calls for Israel to end its occupation of the West Bank. In 1974, ADL leaders Arnold Forster and Benjamin Epstein published The New Anti-Semitism, which identified anti-Zionism as a "new antisemitism", an idea the ADL has sought to popularize since the early 1970s.

== The Arab-Israeli conflict and the settler movement ==
After the 1967 Six-Day War, control of the West Bank (referred to by religious Zionism as Judea and Samaria) and the Gaza Strip (the Occupied Palestinian territories) placed Israel in the position of control over a large population of Palestinian Arabs. Over the years this has generated conflict between competing core Zionist ideals of an egalitarian democratic state on the one hand, and territorial loyalty to historic Jewish areas, particularly the old city of Jerusalem, on the other.

== Anti-Zionism and Soviet Jewry ==
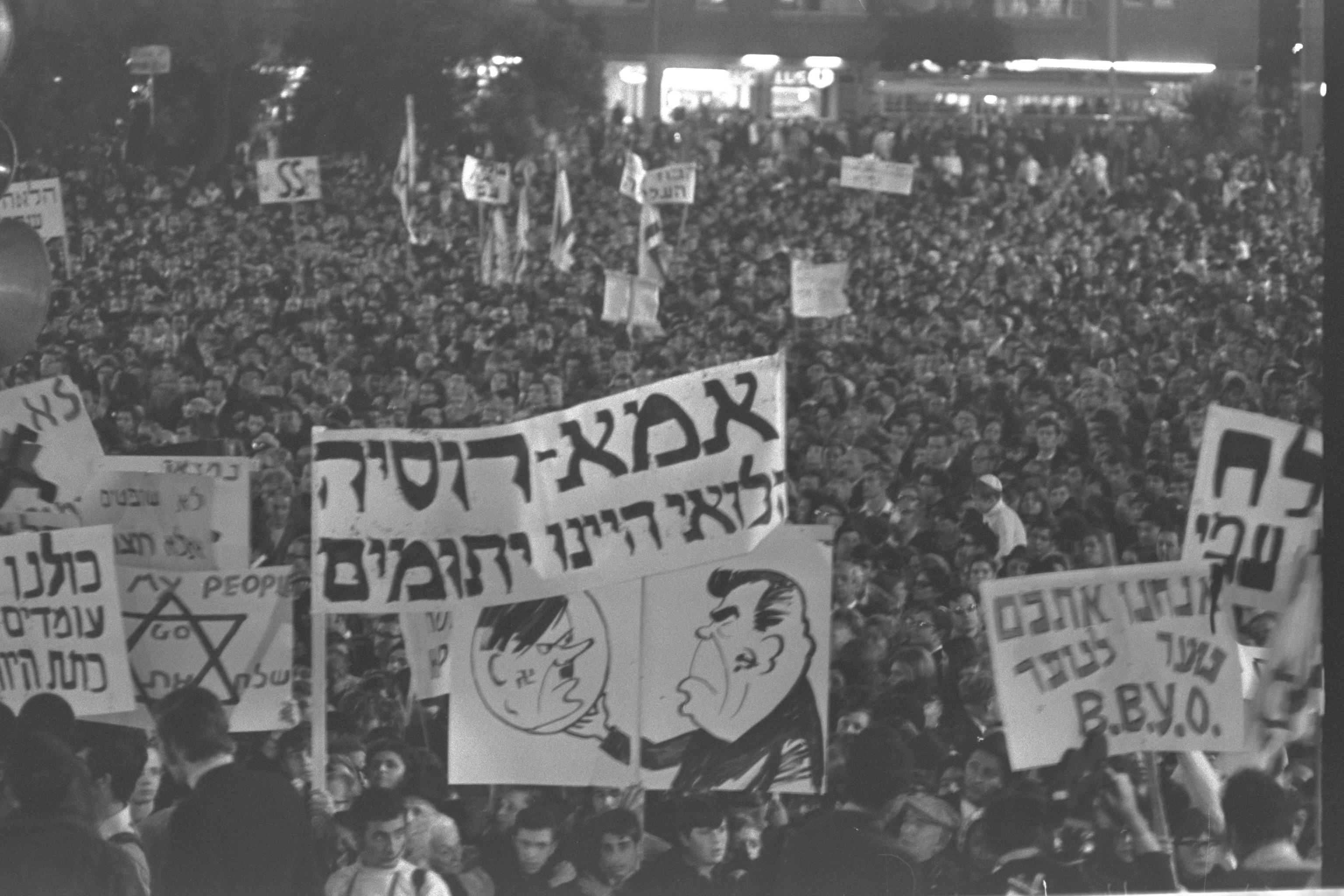
Israeli demonstration in support of Soviet Jewry

Through the 1930s, Zionist activism in the Soviet Union had been restricted, with the USSR becoming increasingly anti-Jewish in the late 1940s, with this often occurring under the guise of anti-Zionism. After 1967 the Soviet bloc (except Romania) broke off relations with Israel. Antisemitic purges encouraged the remnants of Polish Jewry to move to Israel. Increased Soviet antisemitism and enthusiasm generated by the 1967 victory led to a wave of Soviet Jews applying to emigrate to Israel. Most Jews were refused exit visas and persecuted by the authorities. Some were arrested, becoming known as Prisoners of Zion.

== UN resolution declaring Zionism is a form of racism ==
In November 1975, United Nations General Assembly Resolution 3379 which determines "that Zionism is a form of racism and racial discrimination" passed with 72 votes in favour, 35 votes against, and 32 abstentions. In December 1991, it was revoked by Resolution 46/86, which passed with 111 votes in favour, 25 votes against, and 13 abstentions. Israel set its passing as a precondition for its participation in the Madrid Peace Conference of 1991, an attempt to initiate an Israeli–Palestinian peace process based on the concept of land for peace.

== The rise of Likud and the end of Labour hegemony ==
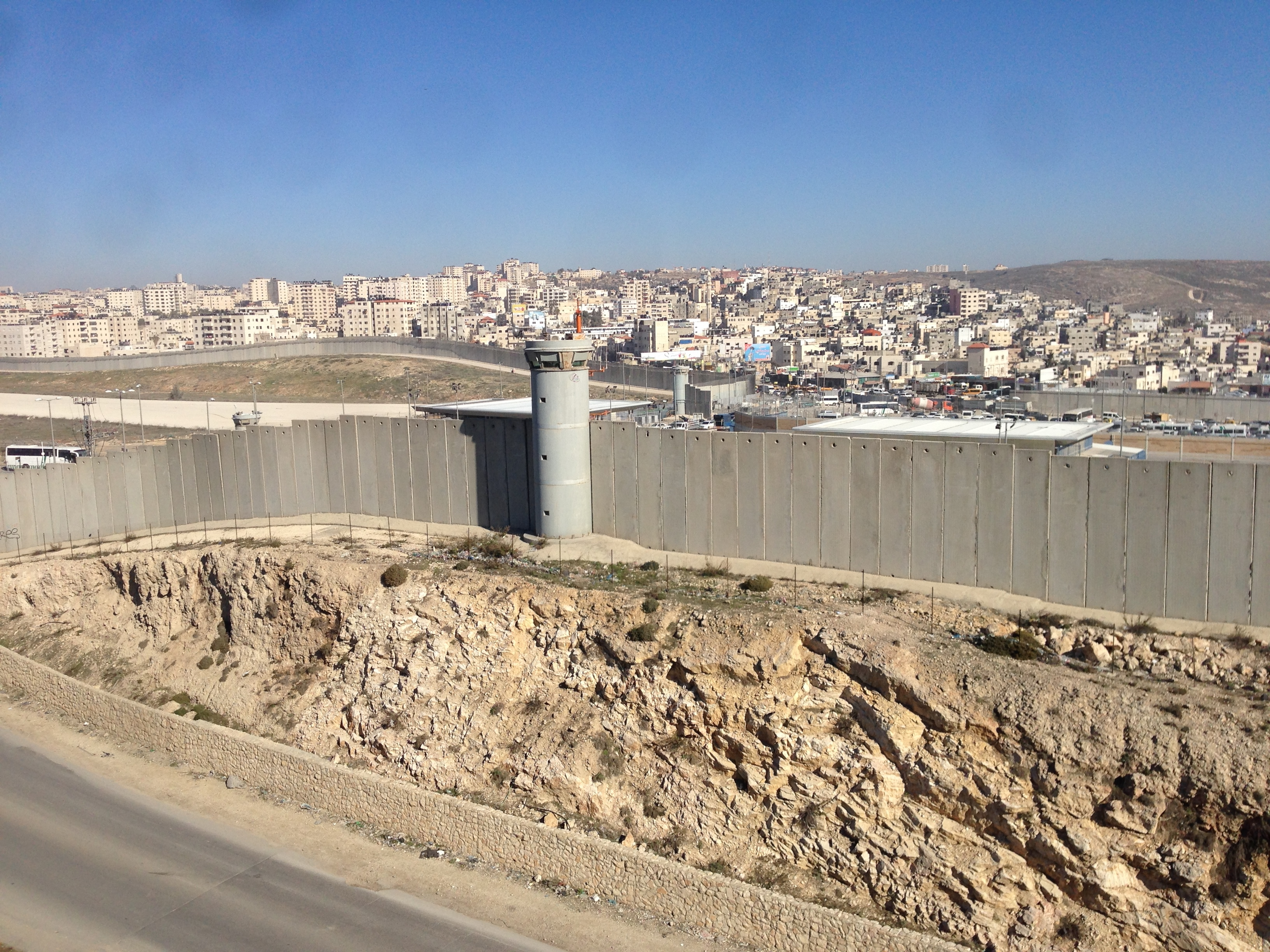
Israeli watchtowers and wall at the checkpoint of the Palestinian refugee camp of Qalandia, 2014. Israel started building West Bank barriers during the Second Intifada.

The election of 1977, characterised as "the revolution", brought the nationalistic, right-wing, Revisionist Zionist, Likud Party to power, after thirty years in opposition to the dominant Labor Party and indicated further movement to the political right. The 1977 election manifesto of the Likud party said: "Between the sea and the Jordan there will only be Israeli sovereignty."

Joel Greenburg, writing in The New York Times twenty years after the election, notes its significance and that of related events; he writes:

The seed was sown in 1977, when Menachem Begin of Likud brought his party to power for the first time in a stunning election victory over the Labor Party. A decade before, in the 1967 war, Israeli troops had in effect undone the partition accepted in 1948 by overrunning the West Bank and Gaza Strip. Ever since, Mr. Begin had preached undying loyalty to what he called Judea and Samaria (the West Bank lands) and promoted Jewish settlement there. But he did not annex the West Bank and Gaza to Israel after he took office, reflecting a recognition that absorbing the Palestinians could turn Israel it into a binational state instead of a Jewish one.

== Oslo Accords ==
The Oslo I Accord, signed between Israel and the Palestine Liberation Organization (PLO) in Washington, D.C., in 1993 and the Oslo II Accord, signed in Taba, Egypt, in 1995, marked the start of the Oslo process, a so-called peace process aimed at achieving a peace treaty based on Resolution 242 and Resolution 338 of the United Nations Security Council.

In 2018, Israel passed the Basic Law: Israel as the Nation-State of the Jewish People.

== New Zionisms ==
Since the establishment of the State of Israel, two major paths of development in Zionism have occurred, leading to post-Zionism and neo-Zionism. Neo-Zionism developed from the 1970s, led by settlers in the occupied territories, supported by politicians and parties in the "national camp" of Israeli politics. It holds a strong position on ethnic nationalism and racism. Post-Zionism developed from the 1980s among the middle classes of Israel's major coastal cities. It focusses more on civil rights within Israeli society than to ideas of nationalism, emphasising Israel as a "democratic state" as opposed to a "Jewish State".

== See also ==
=== Types of Zionism ===
- Christian Zionism
- Cultural Zionism
- General Zionists
- Labor Zionism
- Reform Zionism
- Religious Zionism
- Revisionist Zionism

=== Zionist institutions and organizations ===
- Histadrut
- The Jewish Agency for Israel
- Am Yisrael Foundation
- Jewish National Fund
- Vaad Leumi
- World Zionist Organization

=== History of Zionism and the Israeli–Palestinian conflict ===
- History of Israel
- History of Palestine
- History of the Southern Levant
- Israeli–Palestinian conflict
- List of Zionist figures
- Timeline of Zionism

=== Related concepts ===
- Anti-Zionism
- Jewish Autonomism
- Jewish emancipation
- Yerida
