= Zionism in Israeli politics =

Zionism in politics

In the politics of Israel, the term Zionism is used for a broad spectrum of political beliefs consisting of support for the State of Israel.

== Views on Palestinian nationalism ==
Some Liberal Zionists and Labor Zionists support a two-state solution, in which a State of Palestine is established alongside Israel; others support offering Israeli citizenship to Palestinians in a one-state solution instead.

Other Zionists including Religious Zionists and Revisionist Zionists oppose Palestinian self-determination, including Prime Minister Benjamin Netanyahu, who passed the Nation State Law in 2018 declaring Israel as a Jewish nation-state.

== Accusations of anti-Zionism ==
Some Israeli politicians accuse other politicians of anti-Zionism, such as former Prime Minister Naftali Bennett accusing Netanyahu of being anti-Zionist due to his support for the Haredi exemption from military service in Israel; conversely, Bezalel Smotrich accused Bennett of undermining Zionism due to having coalitioned with Ra'am in the thirty-sixth government of Israel.

== See also ==
History of Zionism (1948–present)
