= London Declaration on Combating Antisemitism =

The London Declaration on Combating Antisemitism is a declaration which asserts the need for global cooperation in the fight against Antisemitism by drawing "The Democratic world’s attention to the resurgence of Antisemitism as a potent force in politics, international affairs and society". It was signed on February 17, 2009, in Lancaster House, during the Conference and Summit of the Inter-parliamentary Coalition for Combating Antisemitism, by some of the world's leading parliamentarians.

== Background ==
The first annual conference of the "Inter-parliamentary Coalition for Combating Antisemitism" (ICCA) was held in London, England in February, 2009. It brought together over 100 parliamentarians and NGO representatives from 35 different countries to discuss the uprising of contemporary antisemitism (i.e. old and New Antisemitism) around the world, by sharing knowledge, experience and recommendations. By the end of the first annual conference, the Parliamentarians "call upon national governments, parliaments, international institutions, political and civic leaders, NGOs, and civil society to affirm democratic and human values, build societies based on respect and citizenship and combat any manifestations of antisemitism and discrimination". The conference concluded with the signing of the London Declaration on Combating Antisemitism.

== Content ==
The declaration deals with 6 fundamental issues:

=== Challenging Antisemitism ===
Parliamentarians shall expose, challenge, and isolate political actors who engage in hate against Jews and target the State of Israel as a Jewish collectivity [...] Governments must challenge any foreign leader, politician or public figure who denies, denigrates or trivialises the Holocaust and must encourage civil society to be vigilant to this phenomenon and to openly condemn it [...] Governments and the UN should resolve that never again will the institutions of the international community and the dialogue of nation states be abused to try to establish any legitimacy for antisemitism, including the singling out of Israel for discriminatory treatment in the international arena, and we will never witness – or be party to – another gathering like the United Nations World Conference against Racism, Racial Discrimination, Xenophobia and other related Intolerances in Durban in 2001 [...] Leaders of all religious faiths should be called upon to use all the means possible to combat antisemitism and all types of discriminatory hostilities among believers and society at large.

=== Prohibitions ===
Governments should fully reaffirm and actively uphold the Genocide Convention, recognising that where there is incitement to genocide signatories automatically have an obligation to act [...] Parliamentarians should legislate effective Hate Crime legislation recognising "hate aggravated crimes" and, where consistent with local legal standards, "incitement to hatred" offences and empower law enforcement agencies to convict.

=== Identifying the threat ===
Parliamentarians should return to their legislature, Parliament or Assembly and establish inquiry scrutiny panels that are tasked with determining the existing nature and state of antisemitism in their countries and developing recommendations for government and civil society action [...] Governments must expand the use of the EUMC 'Working Definition of antisemitism' to inform policy of national and international organisations and as a basis for training material for use by Criminal Justice Agencies.

=== Education, awareness and training ===
Governments should train Police, prosecutors and judges comprehensively. The training is essential if perpetrators of antisemitic hate crime are to be successfully apprehended, prosecuted, convicted and sentenced [...] Governments should develop teaching materials on the subjects of the Holocaust, racism, antisemitism and discrimination which are incorporated into the national school curriculum. All teaching materials ought to be based on values of comprehensiveness, inclusiveness, acceptance and respect and should be designed to assist students to recognise and counter antisemitism and all forms of hate speech [...] Education Authorities should ensure that freedom of speech is upheld within the law and to protect students and staff from illegal antisemitic discourse and a hostile environment in whatever form it takes including calls for boycotts.

=== Community Support ===
The Criminal Justice System should publicly notify local communities when antisemitic hate crimes are prosecuted by the courts to build community confidence in reporting and pursuing convictions through the Criminal Justice system [...] Parliamentarians should [...] support efforts that encourage Holocaust education, inter-religious dialogue and cultural exchange.

=== Media and the Internet ===
Governments should acknowledge the challenge and opportunity of the growing new forms of communication [...] An international task force of Internet specialists comprised of parliamentarians and experts should be established to create common metrics to measure antisemitism and other manifestations of hate online and to develop policy recommendations and practical instruments for Governments and international frameworks to tackle these problems.

== Responses ==
Britain's prime minister, Gordon Brown, who was the first to sign the declaration, said:

“So many of the principles it enshrines are already things we are doing here in Britain, and while I’m proud of the bold action Britain has taken to combat Antisemitism such as improved reporting, prosecutions for anti-Semitic Internet hate and the funding of Holocaust education in schools, there is no room for complacency [...] I encourage other heads of government to become signatories to this historic agreement. Together our renewed efforts can rid the world of this ancient virus."

Hannah Rosenthal, special envoy to monitor and combat Antisemitism, said at the 9th Biennial Stephen S. Weinstein Holocaust Symposium that:

"This document is important not only because of what it says, but because it started an intentional conversation about the global ills of anti-Semitism."
