= Canadian Parliamentary Coalition to Combat Antisemitism =

Formed in March 2009, the Canadian Parliamentary Coalition to Combat Antisemitism (CPCCA) was a group of Canadian parliamentarians organized for the stated purpose of confronting and combating antisemitism in Canada. In particular, the CPCCA focused on what it calls the "new antisemitism," which it saw as the revival of classically antisemitic beliefs in the guise of anti-Zionism.

The CPCCA comprised former and sitting Members of Parliament from the Conservative Party of Canada, Liberal Party of Canada, New Democratic Party and initially also from the Bloc Québécois. The coalition was not an official committee and was not established by the Canadian government or Parliament as a whole, but organized itself to conduct hearings and produce a report in the same manner as a parliamentary committee.

On July 7, 2011, the CPCCA released its final report on antisemitism in Canada.

== History ==
The CPCCA was founded in association with the Inter-parliamentary Coalition for Combating Antisemitism (ICCA) which had its inaugural conference in London, England in 2009. The ICCA released a Declaration on Combating Antisemitism, which led to the formation of the CPCCA.

Noting that while antisemitism is not a new phenomenon, there has been recently a resurgence of antisemitism both internationally and in Canada, so much so that, according to the CPCCA, "Jewish students...are fearful to wear a Jewish skull cap or Jewish star of David around their necks" on Canadian university campuses.

On 9 March 2010, the Bloc Québécois withdrew from the CPCCA, asserting that the CPCCA had refused to meet with groups who opposed the view that criticism of Zionism and of the Israeli government is not antisemitism. The Bloc Québécois claimed that the Coalition was biased in favor of Israeli policies and noted that they "consider that the Coalition is tainted, partisan and presents a single side of the coin. We desired a much more moderate approach, more consensual, and still with the outlook to find peace."

The CPCCA hosted the Second Annual Inter-parliamentary Conference to Combat Antisemitism which was held in November 2010 in Ottawa, Ontario, Canada.

== Steering Committee ==
The steering committee of the CPCCA consists of the following current or former Canadian Members of Parliament:

- Scott Reid, Chair
- Mario Silva, Vice Chair
- Raymonde Folco
- Bob Rae
- Candice Hoeppner
- Peter Stoffer
- Pat Martin
- David Sweet
- Irwin Cotler, Ex officio
- Jason Kenney, Ex officio

Secretariat

- Corey Lerman
- Dan Rabkin

== Criticism ==
The Bloc Québécois accused the unofficial parliamentary committee of an unwillingness to hear diverse voices. When the party withdrew from the committee, it criticized "the inequality of opinions presented before the coalition" and "the refusal of the steering committee to hear groups with opposing viewpoints." Bloc parliamentarian Michel Guimond has said that the committee's approach "was not sufficiently balanced."

A number of critics asserted that the Coalition's goal is to conflate criticism of Israeli policy with antisemitism. For example:

- Joanne Naiman, a former Professor of Sociology at Ryerson University argued that the CPCCA "is effectively a done deal" and that it aimed "to create a serious chill on university campuses and in the media" as a deterrent to criticism of Israel's treatment of the Palestinian people. In an article posted on The Socialist Project, Naiman sharply criticized Jason Kenney and Irwin Cotler for their roles in the CPCCA.
- Michael Keefer, a Professor of English at the University of Guelph charged that the CPCCA is "an attempt to curtail freedom of speech and academic freedom across Canada, and to possibly criminalize certain kinds of human rights discourse."
- Independent Jewish Voices (Canada) likewise described the CPCCA as an "attempt to attack free speech and silence criticism of the Israeli government's oppressive and illegal policies" and "to label criticism of Israel and its behavior, as well as organized efforts to change them, as anti-Semitic and to criminalize both."

Response

The CPCCA denied any intention to limit legitimate criticism of Israel. In particular, it stated that, while it affirmed others' alarm at "the resurrection of the old language of prejudice and its modern manifestations – in rhetoric and political action – against Jews, Jewish belief and practice and the State of Israel", nonetheless "dissent and opposition to individual actions of the Israeli government are both permitted and encouraged in and outside of Israel, just as political dissent is permitted and encouraged with respect to any democratic nation."

Steering Committee Chair Scott Reid rejected the suggestion that the group's focus on antisemitism is misdirected, since he argued that these will not use up all of the goodwill that exists on the part of Canadians for resolving issues related hate directed at minority groups: "I think the best way to think of this is [that as a result of our hearings into antisemitism, Canada's] anti-xenophobic, anti-racist, anti-bigotry muscle gets exercised and the more it gets exercised, the stronger it is for dealing with all of those other forms of racism, xenophobia and bigotry."

== 2011 Release of Inquiry Panel Report ==
On July 7, 2011, Conservative MP Scott Reid and former Liberal MP Mario Silva announced the release of the CPCCA Final Report. The Final Report was the product of the Inquiry Panel of the CPPCA.

The Panel stated that "criticism of Israel is not anti-Semitic" but that "denying its right to exist, or seeking its destruction, could be considered anti-Semitic acts." It further stated that "in the most vile and clear expressions of the new anti-Semitism, Jewish support for Israel and the notion of Israel as a criminal state is used to further traditional anti-Semitic themes. These manifestations use the discourse of politics but, in fact, constitute masked hatred."

The committee recommended, among other things that:

- police forces across Canada be better trained to deal with anti-Semitism;
- a clear definition of what anti-Semitism entails be developed;
- universities host conferences to counter events such as "Israeli Apartheid Week". The panel also rejected allegations from supporters of IAW that criticism of this and similar events are attempts to stifle their free speech; the report did not recommend that universities try and shut down the events, but made a number of recommendations aimed at protecting the safety of students.
- Citizenship and Immigration Canada should give special consideration to rising international anti-Semitism when making decisions about who is permitted to settle in Canada and from which countries they are coming; and that education about human rights be made a bigger part of training programs offered to new Canadians;
- The House of Commons' foreign affairs committee do a study on the UN's "overemphasis of alleged human rights abuses by Israel while ignoring flagrant human rights abuses of other member states."
