= Inter-parliamentary Coalition for Combating Antisemitism =

The Inter-parliamentary Coalition for Combating Antisemitism (ICCA) is an international coalition of Parliamentarians from around the world that work together to combat antisemitism. Among its goals is the understanding and awareness of modern antisemitism and ways to combat it on a global scale.

The first annual conference of the ICCA was held in London, England in cooperation with the British Government in 2009 and produced the London Declaration on Combating Antisemitism. Former British prime minister Gordon Brown was the first world leader to sign the Declaration. It has subsequently been signed by several additional Prime Ministers across the globe and more than 600 Parliamentarians worldwide.

The second annual conference was held in Ottawa, Canada in association with the Canadian Parliamentary Coalition to Combat Antisemitism and the Canadian Government on November 7–9, 2010.

The ICCA established an informal working group on antisemitism in the European Parliament, which produced a report into hate on the internet and established a working group on hate on the internet including all major internet industry players.

== Steering Committee ==
The Steering Committee of the ICCA consists of:

- John Mann, Member of the British Parliament
- Petra Bayr, Member of the Austrian Parliament
- Irwin Cotler, Member of the Canadian Parliament
- Petra Pau, vice-president of the German Bundestag
- Christopher Smith, Member of United States Congress
- Cecilia Wikstrom, Member of the European Parliament, Sweden
- Emanuelis Zingeris, Member of the Lithuanian Parliament
- Evariste Kalisa, Member of the Rwandan Parliament, vice-president of the Chamber of Deputies
