= Mario Silva (politician) =

Canadian politician (born 1966)

Mário Silva
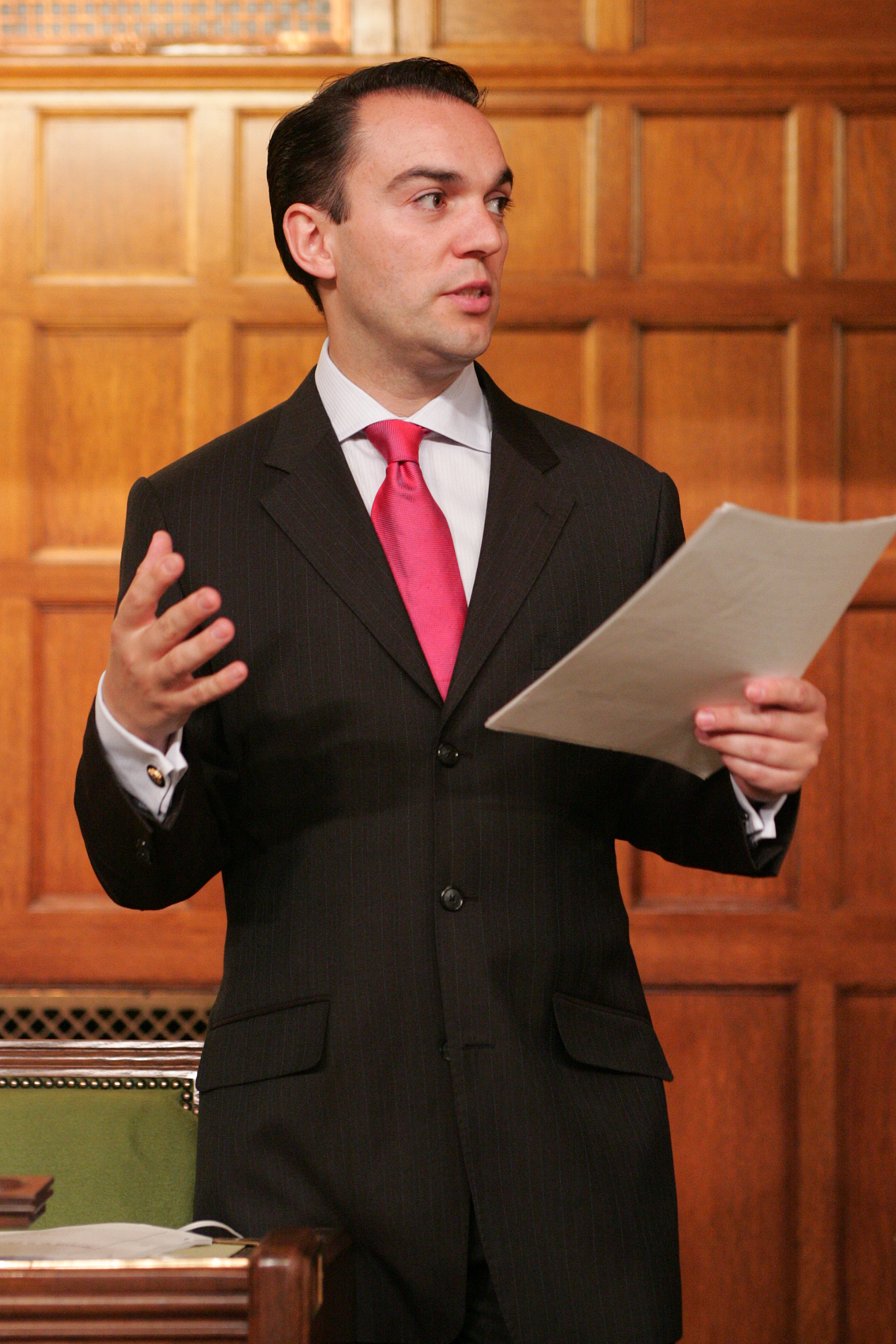

Member of the Canadian Parliament for Davenport
- In office 28 June 2004 – 2 May 2011
- Preceded by: Charles Caccia
- Succeeded by: Andrew Cash

Toronto city councillor
- In office 1994–1997
- Preceded by: Tony O'Donohue
- Succeeded by: Wards reorganized due to the municipal amalgamation of Toronto
- Constituency: Ward 3 (Brockton)

Toronto city councillor
- In office 1997–2003
- Preceded by: Ward established
- Succeeded by: Adam Giambrone
- Constituency: Ward 20 (Trinity-Niagara)

Personal details
- Born: 11 June 1966 (age 59) Azores, Portugal
- Party: Liberal
- Profession: Legal scholar

Mário Silva (born 11 June 1966) is a Canadian legal scholar and former politician. Silva served as a Canadian member of Parliament from 2004 to 2011. He began his political career as a Toronto city councillor from 1994 to 2003. He then moved to federal politics, being elected for the Liberal Party of Canada in the 2004 election in the Toronto riding of Davenport. He served as the Official Opposition Critic for Foreign Affairs (Americas) after having served as Critic for the Treasury Board and Labour. In 2007, the President of the French Republic bestowed him the title of Knight of the Order of the Legion of Honour (Ordre national de la Légion d'honneur). He has also been awarded the Order of Merit of Portugal. and the Order of Rio Branco from Brazil.

Silva holds a BA in political science from the University of Toronto, a "Certificat de Langue Française" from Paris-Sorbonne University, and a master's degree in International Human Rights Law from University of Oxford in the United Kingdom. Silva holds a PhD in the Faculty of Law at the National University of Ireland, Galway. Silva's PhD thesis is titled "Failed and Failing States: Causes and Conditions." On 15 December 2011, Prime Minister Stephen Harper appointed him to chair the International Holocaust Remembrance Alliance (formally the Task Force for International Cooperation on Holocaust Education, Remembrance and Research (ITF)) in 2013. He is currently a distinguished fellow, law and business at Ryerson University in Toronto. On 30 July 2020 he was appointed vice chair of the Human Rights Tribunal of Ontario.

== Local politics ==
Born in the Azores, Portugal, he was first elected to city council in 1994 after defeating veteran councillor Tony O'Donohue by 15 votes. Silva received a high grade from the Toronto Environmental Alliance for his support of environmental initiatives, and has strong support from the Labour Movement. Silva is of Portuguese background and is popular in the local Portuguese Canadian community. Silva served on several boards including: vice-chair, Toronto Transit Commission; chair, Exhibition Place; board of directors, Mount Sinai Hospital; vice chair, Toronto Hydro Company; board of directors, Canadian Opera Company; 2013 chair, Brazil Carnival Ball and chair of the Brazil Institute of Canada.

== Federal politics ==
Silva's move to federal politics saw him claim the Liberal nomination in Davenport instead of Liberal incumbent Charles Caccia. An ally of new Prime Minister Paul Martin, Silva was seen by the party as a preferable candidate to Caccia.

As a Member of Parliament Silva served on several committees including the Environment Committee and the Canadian Heritage Committee. He has championed several human rights and environmental issues including being the first MP to back the Canadian Boreal Initiative, and an outspoken critic for the defence of undocumented workers.

Silva chaired the inquiry panel of the Canadian Parliamentary Coalition to Combat Antisemitism (CPCCA), a multi-partisan group of MPs which conducted investigations into antisemitism in Canada. He was vice-chair of the CPCCA's steering committee, which organized an international conference on antisemitism in Ottawa in 2010.

Silva was the first Portuguese-Canadian Member of Parliament.

Silva retained the seat in the 2006 election and was the only GTA Liberal MP to increase his voter margin but was defeated in the 2011 election, losing his seat to Andrew Cash. Silva assumed the role of chair for the Task Force for International Cooperation on Holocaust Education, Remembrance and Research (ITF) in 2013. Silva was also appointed by the Centre for Israel and Jewish Affairs (CIJA) as a director.

== Academic career ==
Silva obtained a PhD in international law from the National University of Ireland, Galway. He has held positions in Ryerson University and McGill University, where he is currently a visiting professor. Silva is a fellow at the Montreal Institute for Genocide and Human Rights Studies at Concordia University. Silva was appointed a distinguished visiting professor at Ryerson University. He hold a certificate in Humanitarian Law from United Nations University and a certificado de la Lengua Española, Universidad De Salamanca in Spain.

== Publications ==
- Fabric of a Nation, GOLDENeight Publishers, Toronto, 2002 (Co-Author).
- "Extraordinary Rendition: A Challenge to Canadian and United States Legal Obligations Under the Convention Against Torture", California Western International Law Journal, Vol. 39(2), 2009.
- "Somalia: State Failure, Piracy, and the Challenges to International Law", Virginia Journal of International Law, Vol. 50 (3), 2010.
- "Island of Distress: State Failure in Haiti", Florida Journal of International Law, Vol. 23, 2011.
- "Kosovo’s Declaration of Independence and the Right to Self-Determination Under International Law", The Journal of Eurasia Law, Vol. 3(2), 2011, Duke University.
- "Somalia: Challenges to International Law from Piracy and Terrorism in the Horn of Africa", International Journal of Rights and Security, Vol. 1.1 (2012).
- "Pakistan’s State Failure: Impunity and the Rise of Militancy", International Journal of Rights and Security, Vol. 1.1 (2012).
- "State Legitimacy and Failure in International Law", Brill | Nijhoff Development in International Law series, Volume 67.
- "Failed states: causes and consequences", Int. J. Public Law and Policy, Vol. 3, No. 1, 2013.
- Co-author with Dr. Massouda Jalal, "Hanging by a Thread, Afghan Women’s Rights and Security Threats", Mosaic Press (2014).
- Tackling Hate: Combating Antisemitism and the Ottawa Protocol, co-edited with Scott Reid, Mosaic Press, 2014.
- "After Partition: The Perils of South Sudan", University of Baltimore Journal of International Law, 2015.
- " Failed States Impact on Human Rights and International Criminal Justice", in Globalization and Its Impact on the Future of *Human Rights and International Criminal Justice, M. Cherif Bassiouni (ed.), Intersentia Publication, Cambridge, 2015
- Privacy versus Security in the Age of Global Terror, Mosaic Press (2017)
- "Antisemitism and Global Jihad", in Terrorism Revisited: Islamism, Political Violence and State-Sponsorship, Springer (2017)
- Privacy and Security in the Age of Terror, Mosaic Press, 2018
- Humanity at its Worst, Genocide Mass Atrocities Violations of Human Rights in the 21st Century, Mosaic Press (2020)
- "Investor-State Arbitration: Between Sovereignty and Systemic Integrity: The Need for Reform," The International Journal of Arbitration, Mediation and Dispute, Volume 91, Issue 4, 2025
- Bridges Beyond Silence, Mosaic Press, 2025
- Corporation and Human Rights in a Globalized World, Mosaic Press, 2025
- Global Dispute Resolution, Ethics International Press, Cambridge, UK, 2006

== Federal election results ==
2011 Canadian federal election: Davenport
Party	Candidate	Votes	%	±%	Expenditures
New Democratic	Andrew Cash	21,096	53.74	+22.48	
Liberal	Mario Silva	10,946	27.89	-17.88	
Conservative	Theresa Rodrigues	5,573	14.20	+3.19	
Green	Wayne Scott	1,344	3.42	-7.07	
Communist	Miguel Figueroa	167	0.43	-0.03	
Animal Alliance	Simon Luisi	128	0.33	+0.07	
Total valid votes/expense limit		39,254	100.00		
Total rejected ballots		235	0.60	-0.10	
Turnout		39,489	61.92	+8.88	

2008 Canadian federal election: Davenport
Party	Candidate	Votes	%	±%	Expenditures
Liberal	Mario Silva	15,953	45.77	-6.10	$47,491
New Democratic	Peter Ferreira	10,896	31.26	-1.35	$55,530
Conservative	Theresa Rodrigues	3,838	11.01	+0.21	$13,993
Green	Wayne Scott	3,655	10.49	+6.79	$12,172
Canadian Action	Wendy Forrest	172	0.49	+0.18	$723
Communist	Miguel Figueroa	160	0.46	+0.02	$432
Animal Alliance	Simon Luisi	92	0.26	–	$957
Marxist–Leninist	Sarah Thompson	87	0.25	-0.01	
Total valid votes/expense limit		34,853	100.00	$79,438	
Total rejected ballots		245	0.70	+0.09	
Turnout		35,098	53.03	-7.58	

2006 Canadian federal election: Davenport
Party	Candidate	Votes	%	±%
Liberal	Mario Silva	20,172	51.87	+1.18
New Democratic	Gord Perks	12,681	32.61	-1.52
Conservative	Theresa Rodrigues	4,202	10.80	+1.50
Green	Mark O'Brien	1,440	3.70	-0.48
Communist	Miguel Figueroa	172	0.44	+0.03
Canadian Action	Wendy Forrest	122	0.31	+0.02
Marxist–Leninist	Sarah Thompson	103	0.26	+0.02
Total valid votes		38,892	100.00	
Total rejected ballots		240	0.61	-0.22
Turnout		39,132	60.61	+7.72
Elections Canada, Riding of Davenport, Electoral District 35015.

2004 Canadian federal election: Davenport
Party	Candidate	Votes	%	±%
Liberal	Mario Silva	16,773	50.69	-16.03
New Democratic	Rui Pires	11,292	34.13	+20.57
Conservative	Theresa Rodrigues	3,077	9.30	-4.61
Green	Mark O'Brien	1,384	4.18	+1.66
Marijuana	Elmer Gale	251	0.76	-1.12
Communist	Johan Boyden	137	0.41	
Canadian Action	John Riddell	97	0.29	-0.84
Marxist–Leninist	Sarah Thompson	79	0.24	
Total valid votes		33,090	100.00	
Total rejected ballots		278	0.83	
Turnout		33,368	52.89	
Note: Conservative vote is compared to the total of the Canadian Alliance vote and Progressive Conservative vote in 2000 election.
