= The New Anti-Semitism =

1974 book by Arnold Forster and Benjamin Epstein

- Cover of the first edition
- Author: Arnold Forster and Benjamin Epstein
- Language: English
- Subject: Antisemitism
- Publisher: McGraw Hill
- Publication date: 1974
- Publication place: United States
- Media type: Print
- Pages: xii+354
- ISBN: 0-07-021615-0
- OCLC: 796954
- Dewey Decimal: 301.451924
- LC Class: DS146.U6 F67

The New Anti-Semitism is a 1974 book by Anti-Defamation League leaders Arnold Forster and Benjamin Epstein in which the authors present the term new antisemitism (Note: The spelling without hyphenation is preferred according to the International Holocaust Remembrance Alliance, because the spelling with hyphenation implies that there is a valid opposite concept called "Semitism".) and the idea that a new form of discrimination against Jews has emerged, especially with regard to Zionism and the State of Israel. The book chronicles what it presents as both Radical Right and Radical Left antisemitism. The book has been criticized for conflating anti-Zionism—opposition to Zionism—with antisemitism—discrimination against Jews.

== Content ==
The authors describe the new antisemitism as "indifference to the most profound apprehensions of the Jewish people; a blandness and apathy in dealing with anti-Jewish behavior, a widespread incapacity or unwillingness to comprehend the necessity of the existence of Israel to Jewish safety and survival throughout the world."

The book covers what it presents as both Radical Right and Radical Left antisemitism. Examples of the former are given as the George Wallace campaign and the John Birch Society, while the authors argue that there is also a Radical Left antisemitism that is a new and recent phenomenon.

=== On criticism of Israel ===
The equation of anti-Zionism with antisemitism is an important aspect of the book. Forster and Epstein address the matter on page 17 of their book:

Statements and propaganda manifestos calling for the destruction or dissolution of Israel, or equating Israeli defense with Arab assault, are seen by Jews as attacks against themselves and world Jewry and, along with other activities supporting those sworn to destroy Israel, are perceived as the ultimate anti-Semitism.

Of course one can be unsympathetic to or oppose Israel's position on specific issues without being anti-Jewish. But many of the anti-Israel statements from non-Jewish sources, often the most respectable, carry an undeniable anti-Jewish message....

... Just as Israel's survival depends in substantial measure on support from Jews in the United States and elsewhere, Jews in the Diaspora have come to feel that their own security and the only hope for their survival as a people, in a world from which anti-Semitism has never disappeared, depends in large measure on the survival of Israel.

=== On antisemitism in the US ===
The book addresses matters in US popular culture that it labels antisemitic, including Daniel Berrigan, Gerald L. K. Smith's project Christ of the Ozarks, and the 1973 Norman Jewison film Jesus Christ Superstar.

The final two chapters focus on the "Radical Right" and "The Hatemongers", focusing on Willis Carto and his Liberty Lobby, and Smith, a white supremacist Christian writer who railed against Jews. It also focuses on several of his associates, including Ed Fields, the writer of The Thunderbolt racist newspaper, and J. B. Stoner, as well as the Ku Klux Klan.

== Reception ==
Australian journalist and author Robert Moss reviewed the book critically in The New Republic, writing: "The authors see Israel as vital 'to the safety and survival of Jews throughout the world,' and it is here that criticism of their work must begin. For although they concede that 'one can be unsympathetic to Zionism ... without being anti-Jewish,' they themselves continually blur or ignore this distinction."

In her review for the Journal of Ecumenical Studies, Hilda Penman Greenwald wrote of it: "Poorly organized, poorly documented, anecdotal rather than analytical, unselective, and at times quite arbitrary in terms of what constitutes anti-Semitism, the total effect is to vitiate the authors' very real thesis, i.e., that overt anti-Semitism is indeed on the rise with possible consequences far more serious (to Jew and Christian alike) than the authors, because of the very limitations of their approach, can foresee." Greenwald added that the authors "persist in treating this virulent social disease as an epiphenomenon on the social fabric, which will go away if one is vigilant enough about it."

American Methodist theologian and pastor A. Roy Eckardt (1918–1998) reviewed the book favorably, though noting: "Literary duty obliges me to interpose an anticlimactic note. The book is afflicted with shoddy proofreading. Typographical and other minor errors are legion. And, inexcusably, there is no index."

In her review for the Middle East Research and Information Project, Sharon Rose wrote: "To large numbers of Americans, Daniel Berrigan is a hero; his anti-Zionist remarks are particularly threatening to Zionists.Thus they must be quickly branded "anti-Semitism," so that no one but the lunatic fringe will consider them worthy of further discussion. This approach is the basis of Forster and Epstein's work, and indeed, that of most of Berrigan's critics: whatever is anti-Zionist is by definition anti-Semitic."

In Archives de sciences sociales des religions, Martine Cohen writes that the book is essentially descriptive, content to label attitudes as "antisemitic" without addressing the reasons or providing sufficient analysis, but that it "constitutes important foundational work for such a study".

For the American Jewish Historical Quarterly, Morton Rosenstock, while describing the book as "a pot-pourri which does not fully support the authors' hypothesis in a vigorous manner," writes that it is "a useful summary of contemporary anti-Semitism, if not a completely viable theoretical framework."

== Legacy ==
In 2003, Abraham Foxman, director of the ADL from 1987 to 2015, published Never again?: the threat of the new anti-Semitism, in which he drew heavily on Forster and Epstein's book.

Jewish American activist Simone Zimmerman writes that the ADL has "conflated the safety of Jews with support for the state of Israel" since the 1970s, and that it "has sought to popularize the concept of the 'new antisemitism,' the idea that Israel as 'the Jew on the world stage,' was being unfairly singled out for criticism in ways that echoed old school antisemitism."

Emmaia Gelman, founding Director of the Institute for the Critical Study of Zionism, has written that Forster and Epstein's book "sweepingly denounced US movements for racial and economic justice, the anti–Vietnam War movement, and Third Worldist anticolonialism," launching a longer campaign by the ADL to label criticism and historical discussion of Israel and Zionism as anti-semitic.
