= Arnold Forster (attorney) =

American attorney (1912–2010)

Arnold Forster (1912–2010) was a prominent Anti-Defamation League attorney.

== Personal life ==
Forster was born on June 25, 1912, in Brooklyn as Arnold Fastenberg. Forster attended college and law school at St. John's University. At law school, Forster participated in a local play at the Provincetown Playhouse, and the director suggested he change his name to Forster from its original Fastenberg.

Forster married May Kasner in 1940. She died in 2005. They lived in New Rochelle, New York. The Forsters had a son, Stuart who died in 1991. As of 2010, Forster was survived by his daughter and four grandchildren. He died in Brooklyn in 2010 at age 97.

== Career ==
Forster developed a volunteer, pro bono legal team for the Anti-Defamation League (ADL) in 1938. He formally joined the ADL in 1940, constructing the organization's legal department and civil rights program with his title as associate national directory. He was appointed general counsel in January 1946, maintaining the role through 2003.

In 1965 Forster hired Abe Foxman as an ADL legal assistant. Foxman would later become the ADL's director.

Forster retired from the ADL in 1979 and moved to private practice, working with the law firms Shea & Gould and Baer Marks & Upham. He maintained an office at the ADL at least as late as 1988.

At the time he joined in 1940, Forster concentrated his ADL activities on opposing pro-Nazi organizations.

Forster pioneered the ADL's Annual Audit of Antisemitic Incidents, starting the project in 1947 as an annual audit of religious prejudice.

Harry Wall, director of the ADL's Jerusalem office, says that Forster was among the earliest Jewish leaders to campaign for Israel and to warn about a rise in anti-Zionism, which Forster considered a form of antisemitism. Wall says Forster was instrumental in developing the opposition to the Arab boycott of Israel and pushing the subsequent legislation making the boycott illegal. Wall says Forster frequently visited Israel and his Labor Party leadership contacts, Yitzhak Rabin, Abba Eban and Teddy Kollek, and that Forster continued aggressive Israel advocacy and outreach after the rise of the Likud party in 1977. Wall says Forster was a factor in the development of an ADL headquarters in Jerusalem in 1977 and an early proponent of hasbara, PR for Israel. Wall says that, Forster continued practicing law after his retirement from the ADL, for instance representing Ariel Sharon in his successful 1983 libel suit against Time magazine.

== Creative works ==
- Forster co-authored the 1952 book The Troublemakers: An Anti-defamation League Report with Benjamin Epstein. The New York Times' R. L. Duffus was highly critical of the book's overall argument, saying that it "does not succeed in answering the basic question" of why prejudice exists. Though the book succeeds in describing many examples of white supremacist extremism and stupidity, Duffus says, it becomes highly repetitive in these examples without providing analysis or explanation.
- In 1961, Forster released Dateline Israel, a series of radio reports that covered the 1960 capture of Nazi war criminal Adolf Eichmann and the subsequent trial in Israel. At the time, the ADL was concerned that the nature of Eichmann's abduction and the nature of his trial might lead to condemnations of Israel.
- Forster co-authored the 1962 book Some of My Best Friends... with Benjamin Epstein.
- Forster co-authored the 1974 book The New Anti-Semitism with Benjamin Epstein. The book argued that left-wing antisemitism was emerging.
- Forster publish his memoir Square One in 1988. New York Times journalist Marcy Oster described the book as "weak on explaining the reasons for the continued existence of anti-Semitism" but "an earnest chronicle of the useful life of a dedicated man".
