= Mark Strauss (journalist) =

American journalist (born 1966)

- Born: November 8, 1966 (age 59)
- Education: Macalester College (BA); Columbia University Graduate School of Journalism; Paul H. Nitze School of Advanced International Studies
- Occupation: Journalist
- Website: www.mark-strauss.com

Mark Strauss (born November 8, 1966) is an American journalist who writes about politics, science, public opinion, and history.

He is currently the Managing Editor at Air & Space Quarterly, which is published by the Smithsonian’s National Air and Space Museum.

== Biography ==
Strauss received his Bachelor of Arts degree from Macalester College and his master's degree in journalism from Columbia University. He earned his master's degree in Middle East studies and international economics at Johns Hopkins University's Paul H. Nitze School of Advanced International Studies.

Ηe was a writer and editor at the Pew Research Center's Science and Society Program. Previously, he was a feature article writer at National Geographic Online, a senior editor at io9.com, and a senior editor at Smithsonian Magazine. From 2005–2007, he was the editor of the Bulletin of the Atomic Scientists, winner of the 2007 National Magazine Award for General Excellence (in the under 100,000 circulation category), which was awarded by the American Society of Magazine Editors. Before joining the Bulletin, Strauss was a senior editor at the bimonthly magazine Foreign Policy, for which he had worked since 1997. He has contributed articles to Slate, the Chronicle of Higher Education, The Washington Post, The New Republic, The Spectator, the Brown Journal of World Affairs, and Washington Monthly. He has also appeared as a commentator on CNN, Fox News, National Public Radio, and the BBC. Prior to joining Foreign Policy, he was a research assistant at the Brookings Institution's Foreign Policy Studies program, and he served on the staff of a number of prominent national magazines, including SAIS Review, Spy Magazine, and Discover Magazine.

== Sources ==
- Interview with Mark Strauss at Mediabistro.com
- "4 Editors, an Art Director and a Shot at the Magazine Title," New York Times, March 15, 2007
