= Benjamin Epstein =

American ADL director (1912–1983)

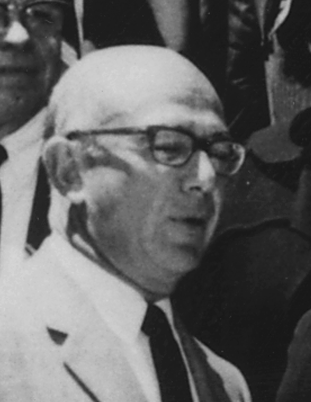
Epstein in 1963

Benjamin R. Epstein (1912–1983) was national director of the Anti-Defamation League from 1948 through 1978. He was ADL vice president from 1978 through 1983.

== Career ==
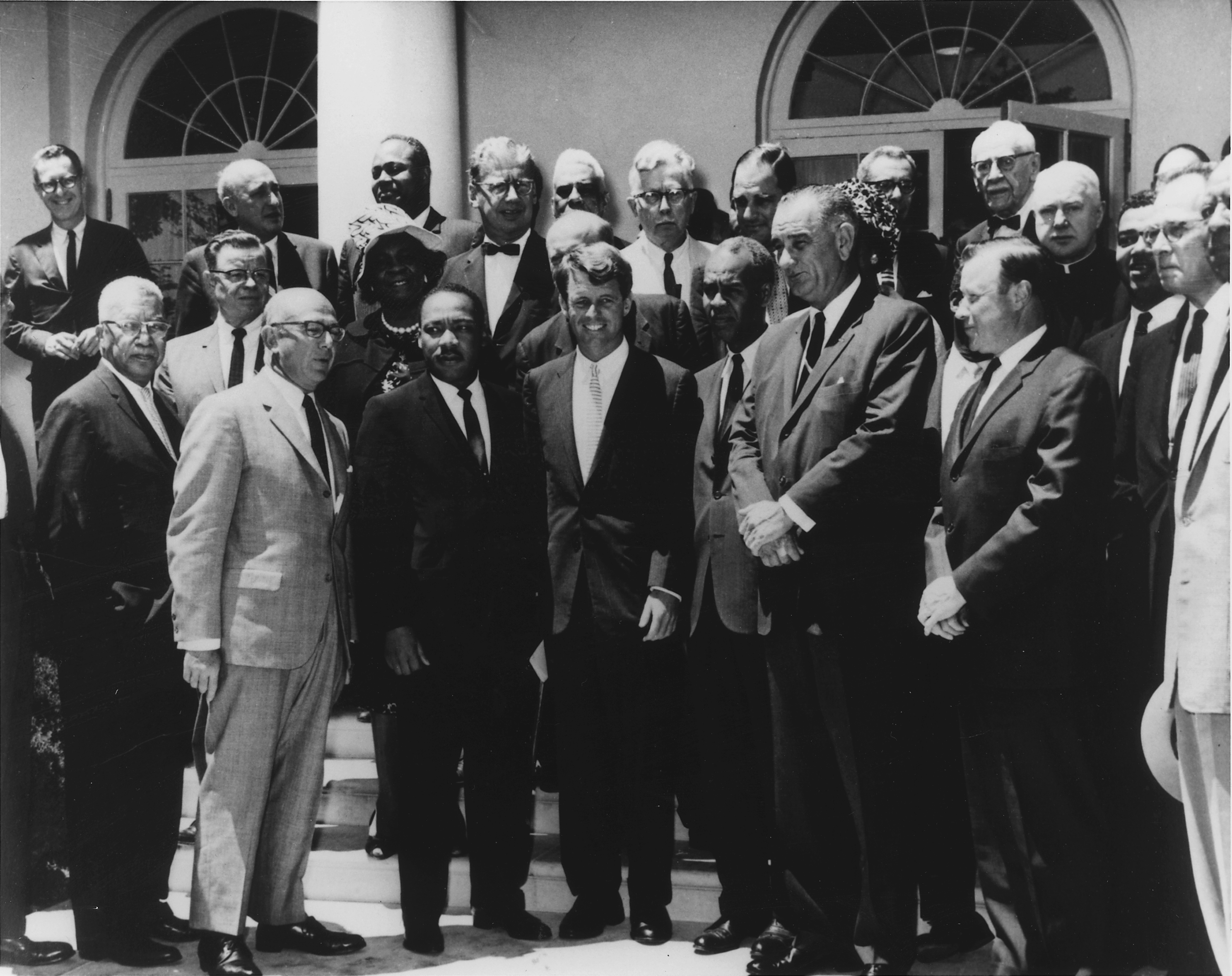
Epstein at a White House meeting with civil rights leaders in 1963. Epstein is to the left of Martin Luther King, Jr. and Robert F. Kennedy

Epstein taught at the University of Pennsylvania and as a high school teacher in Coatesville for several years.

Epstein joined the ADL in 1939 as directory of its Foreign Languages Department. Epstein later became the Eastern regional director. Epstein was national director of the Anti-Defamation League from 1948 through 1978. He was ADL vice president from 1978 through 1983.

Epstein replaced Richard Gutstadt, the national director from 1931 to 1948, part of a broader generational shift in which Gustadt's crowd of German, Jewish particularist gradualists gave way to Epstein's younger cohort of eastern European, universalist, activist leaders. In assuming leadership, Epstein changed tactics to favor aggression in pursuit of fighting antisemitism and Nazism in the United States. Whereas Gustadt avoided media and employed fact-finding campaigns to better understand Nazi groups, Epstein conducted public and oppositional media campaigns against antisemites and led infiltration of Nazi groups. For instance, Epstein's colleague and ADL attorney Arnold Forster developed a relationship with gossip columnist Walter Winchell, whom Forster fed embarrassing tidbits regarding antisemites. Prior to Gustadt's death in 1946, this contributed to tensions between the new and former ADL leaders.

In 1939, the ADL was informed of someone in Chicago, Illinois translating an edition of Adolf Hitler's Mein Kampf. Epstein went to investigate, and he learned that then-journalist, future senator Alan Cranston had commissioned the translation. Cranston had been shocked that the available English translations of Mein Kampf left out the worst of Hitler's antisemitism and militancy. To fix this, Cranston wished to publish a translation highlighting the alarming aspects of Hitler's work. Epstein and Cranston co-founded Noram Publishing to publish the 32-page tabloid edition of Mein Kampf in 1939.

In 1960, Epstein discussed Catholic-Jewish relations with Pope John XXIII. He met with Pope Paul VI in 1971 and 1976.

Epstein marched alongside Martin Luther King at Selma, Alabama.

== Personal life ==
Epstein was born into a Jewish family in Brooklyn and was raised in Coatesville, Pennsylvania. He attended Dickinson College in Pennsylvania as an undergraduate, followed by the University of Pennsylvania for a master's degree. He received an honorary Doctor of Human Letters degree from Dickinson College and an honorary Doctor of Laws from Talladega College in Alabama. In 1934, Epstein did a history fellowship with the University of Berlin in Germany. This brush with Nazism influenced his later anti-prejudice and anti-discrimination work.

At time of his death in 1983, Epstein was survived by his wife Ethel, his children David and Ellen, and five grandchildren.
