= Project Esther =

American conservative project against pro-Palestinian protests and alleged antisemitism

- Established: October 7, 2024; 2 years ago
- Services: Opposition to pro-Palestinian protests and antisemitism
- Leader: Victoria Coates
- Publication: Project Esther: A National Strategy to Combat Antisemitism (2024)
- Parent organization: The Heritage Foundation

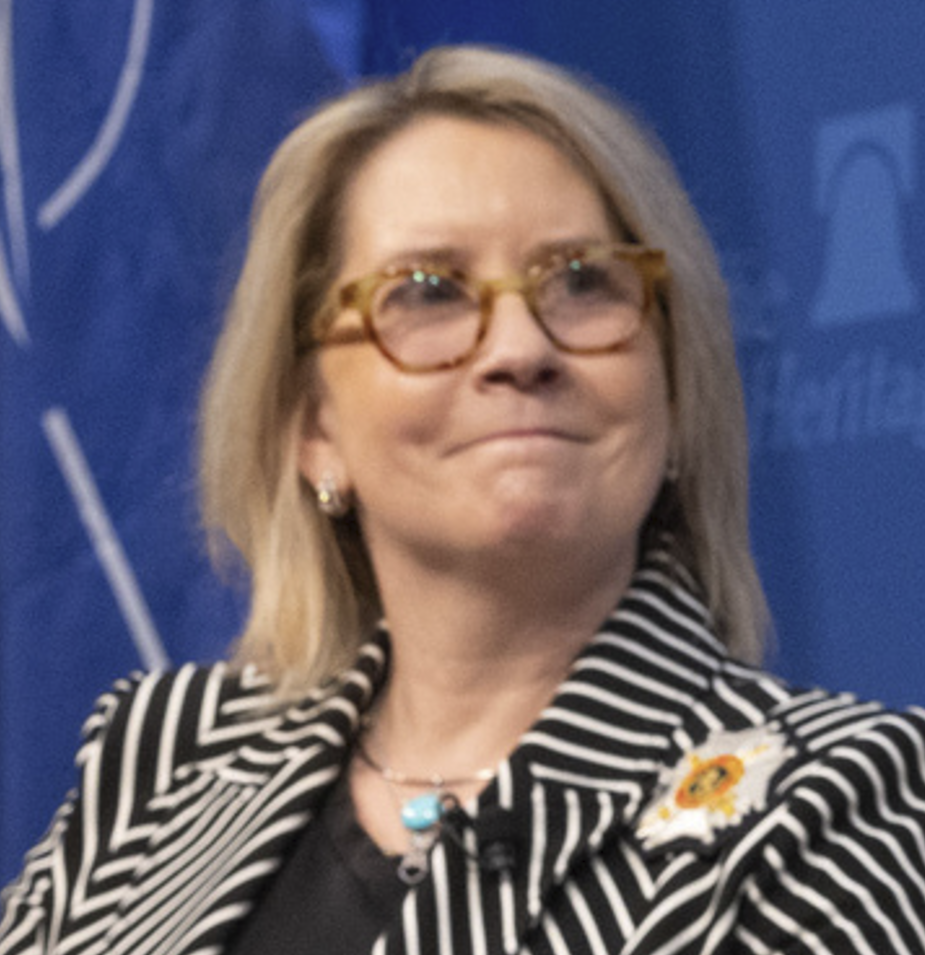
Victoria Coates of the Heritage Foundation leads Project Esther.

Project Esther is a project of the Heritage Foundation, a conservative think tank based in Washington, D.C., that aims to suppress pro-Palestinian protests and what it classifies as antisemitism. The effort has received support from several evangelical Christian organizations but no major Jewish ones. According to The New York Times, Slate, Haaretz, The Forward, and Jewish Insider, Project Esther does not address right-wing antisemitism.

Project Esther has been criticized for incorporating antisemitic tropes into its rhetoric. It broadly labels criticism of Israel as terrorism and calls for targeting universities, students, and American progressive politics and politicians. Politico described Project Esther as "a lesser-known blueprint from the same creators of Project 2025." In May 2025, The New York Times found that the second Trump administration had called for or acted upon more than half of Project Esther's proposals.

== History ==
The Heritage Foundation launched Project Esther in October 2024. It is named after the biblical figure Esther, who, according to the Book of Esther, saved the Jews of Persia from being eradicated. The plan was drafted by Victoria Coates, Robert Greenway, and Daniel Flesch following the October 7 attacks. The project describes pro-Palestinian groups as part of a "Hamas Support Network", and aims to dismantle the pro-Palestinian movement in the US, its support at schools and universities, in progressive organizations, and in Congress by labeling them as "effectively a terrorist support network". According to The New York Times, the plan built on efforts from summer 2024 to create a national strategy to "convince the public to perceive the pro-Palestinian movement in the United States as part of a global 'Hamas Support Network' that 'poses a threat not simply to American Jewry, but to America itself.'"

The project reportedly struggled to find Jewish organizations with which to partner, while sidelining those that do partner with it. Several Jewish and Christian Zionist organizations told The New York Times that they did not want to associate with the plan because its failure to focus on right-wing antisemitism was too partisan.

== Goals and tactics ==
As part of its plans, Project Esther said it would wait until a friendly presidential administration, after which "We will organize rapidly, take immediate action to 'stop the bleeding,' and achieve all objectives within two years." A New York Times report found that many of the second Trump administration's actions called for and closely matched more than half of Project Esther's proposals. In an interview with The Times, Project Esther's architects said that while there were "clear parallels" between its proposals and Trump administration actions, Heritage officials did not know whether the White House had used Project Esther as a guide.

In January 2025, a report by The Forward revealed a leaked pitch deck the Heritage Foundation sent to Project Esther donors that included a plan to identify and target Wikipedia editors the group said were "abusing their position" by publishing allegedly antisemitic content. In May 2025, The New York Times described Project Esther's goal as "branding a broad range of critics of Israel as 'effectively a terrorist support network,' so that they could be deported, defunded, sued, fired, expelled, ostracized and otherwise excluded from what it considered 'open society.'" It highlighted attempts to remove curriculum viewed as "Hamas support" from schools and universities, remove "supporting faculty", purge social media of alleged antisemitic content, rescind institutions' public funding, and revoke visas for and deport those who engaged in pro-Palestinian advocacy. The same month, Project Esther leader Victoria Coates said the project had entered an implementation phase focused on legislative, legal and financial penalties for conduct it regarded as material support for terrorism.

Project Esther accuses "America's Jewish community" of "complacency". Its sole Jewish co-chair, Ellie Cohanim, has criticized other Jewish groups combating antisemitism. Project Esther has sought to identify those who attend pro-Palestinian protests as engaging in "material support" for terrorism, and targeted groups such as Jewish Voice for Peace and Students for Justice in Palestine. Project Esther's pitch materials were first reported on by The Forward, which highlighted its goals as reforming academia by defunding institutions, denying some pro-Palestinian groups access to campuses, and removing faculty. It also supported lawfare through filing civil lawsuits and identifying foreign students for deportation, and planned to enlist local state and federal law enforcement to "generate uncomfortable conditions" to dissuade groups from protesting.

The group has targeted eight "masterminds"—George Soros, Alex Soros, JB Pritzker, Angela Davis, Manolo de los Santos, Vijay Prashad, Neville Singham, and Jodie Evans—who it believes are at the center of progressive politics. The Soros family is the subject of a number of longstanding antisemitic conspiracy theories that match the language used by Project Esther. The New York Times reported its pitch materials to potential donors include an illustration of a pyramid of "progressive elites" with Soros and Pritzker at the top. The presentation also targeted the Tides Foundation and the Rockefeller Brothers Fund as part of an antisemitism "ecosystem", along with "aligned" politicians Bernie Sanders and Elizabeth Warren.

According to Mondoweiss, Project Esther is intended not to combat antisemitism, but to combat political activism, particularly by the left. According to The New York Times, Slate, Haaretz, The Forward, and Jewish Insider, Project Esther does not address right-wing antisemitism. According to Slate, Project Esther does not acknowledge or address right-wing antisemitism or white supremacy. According to The Forward, "Project Esther focuses exclusively on left-wing critics of Israel, ignoring the antisemitism problems from white supremacists and other far-right groups." Haaretz has also reported that Project Esther does not address right-wing antisemitism. When asked by Jewish Insider to explain why the effort did not include right-wing antisemitism, James Carafano, the head of Heritage's antisemitism operations, said "white supremacists are not my problem because white supremacists are not part of being conservative". According to The New York Times, Project Esther head Victoria Coates "acknowledged that antisemitism was also a problem on the right", adding that the progressive groups the Project targets threaten American society, not just Israel.

The Times of Israel has called Project Esther's aim a "government crackdown on anti-Israel groups once Donald Trump returns to the White House". According to Religion Dispatches and The New York Times, Project Esther is closely tied to Christian Zionism and the New Apostolic Reformation. The New York Times reported that several evangelical Christian groups involved in Project Esther had aligned themselves with conservatives in Israel who believe the Bible gives Israel the right to control occupied Palestinian territories, and that some also believe supporting Israel will hasten the end times or advance Christianity's global influence.

In July 2026, Mahmoud Khalil filed a lawsuit, citing the Ku Klux Klan Act and alleging that the Heritage Foundation, through Project Esther, conspired with pro-Israel organizations and top officials in the Trump administration to deny Palestine liberation advocates their constitutional rights.

== Reception ==
Inside Philanthropy wrote, "The Project Esther document is repetitive and the prose is overwrought, but given the Heritage Foundation's potential influence in a second Trump administration, it's worth taking seriously." Project Esther has received support primarily from evangelical Christian organizations. Supporting organizations include the Family Research Council, Faith and Freedom Coalition, Coalition for Jewish Values, and the National Committee for Religious Freedom.

Critics argue that Project Esther sometimes engages in weaponization of antisemitism. For example, The New York Times reported that Project Esther has been criticized for "exploiting real concerns about antisemitism" to advance "radically reshaping higher education and crushing progressive movements more generally". Jonathan Jacoby, the national director of the Nexus Project, criticized Esther for making antisemitism "no longer about ideology or politics; it's about terrorism and threats to American national security."

Project Esther has been criticized for incorporating antisemitic tropes into its rhetoric, and for not addressing right-wing antisemitism. The journalist Michelle Goldberg has criticized Esther for accusing progressive Jews of antisemitism. According to Baptist News Global, "Project Esther's own rhetoric about battling powerful Jewish 'masterminds' reinforces centuries-old conspiracy theories about Jews who have too much power and influence."

An open letter from three dozen former members of Jewish groups and former Anti-Defamation League national chair Robert Sugarman criticized Project Esther, saying, "a range of actors are using a purported concern about Jewish safety as a cudgel to weaken higher education, due process, checks and balances, freedom of speech and the press" and calling on Jewish leaders and institutions "to resist the exploitation of Jewish fears and publicly join with other organizations that are battling to preserve the guardrails of democracy." Executive director Stefanie Fox of Jewish Voice for Peace criticized Project Esther and Trump as "pulling straight from the authoritarian playbook, using tools of repression first against those organizing for Palestinian rights", and "in so doing, sharpening those tools for use against anyone and everyone who challenges his fascist agenda." Fox said that Project Esther has "absolutely nothing to do with Jewish safety, and it is intended solely to destroy the Palestinian liberation movement using tools that can then be used against all communities and movements and democracy itself."

Schuyler Mitchell wrote on Truthout that Project Esther is particularly interested in finding ways to interfere with left-leaning activism, in part through the use of the RICO Act, and that its methods resemble those of McCarthyism. Jacobin has said Project Esther is part of a red scare against the pro-Palestinian movement and the political left.

== See also ==
- 2024 pro-Palestinian protests on university campuses
- Anti-Palestinian racism during the Gaza war
- Antisemitism during the Gaza war
- Antisemitism in the United States
- Islamophobia during the Gaza war
- New antisemitism
- Zionist antisemitism – Antisemitic supporters of Zionism and Israel
