= Debra Saunders =

American political journalist

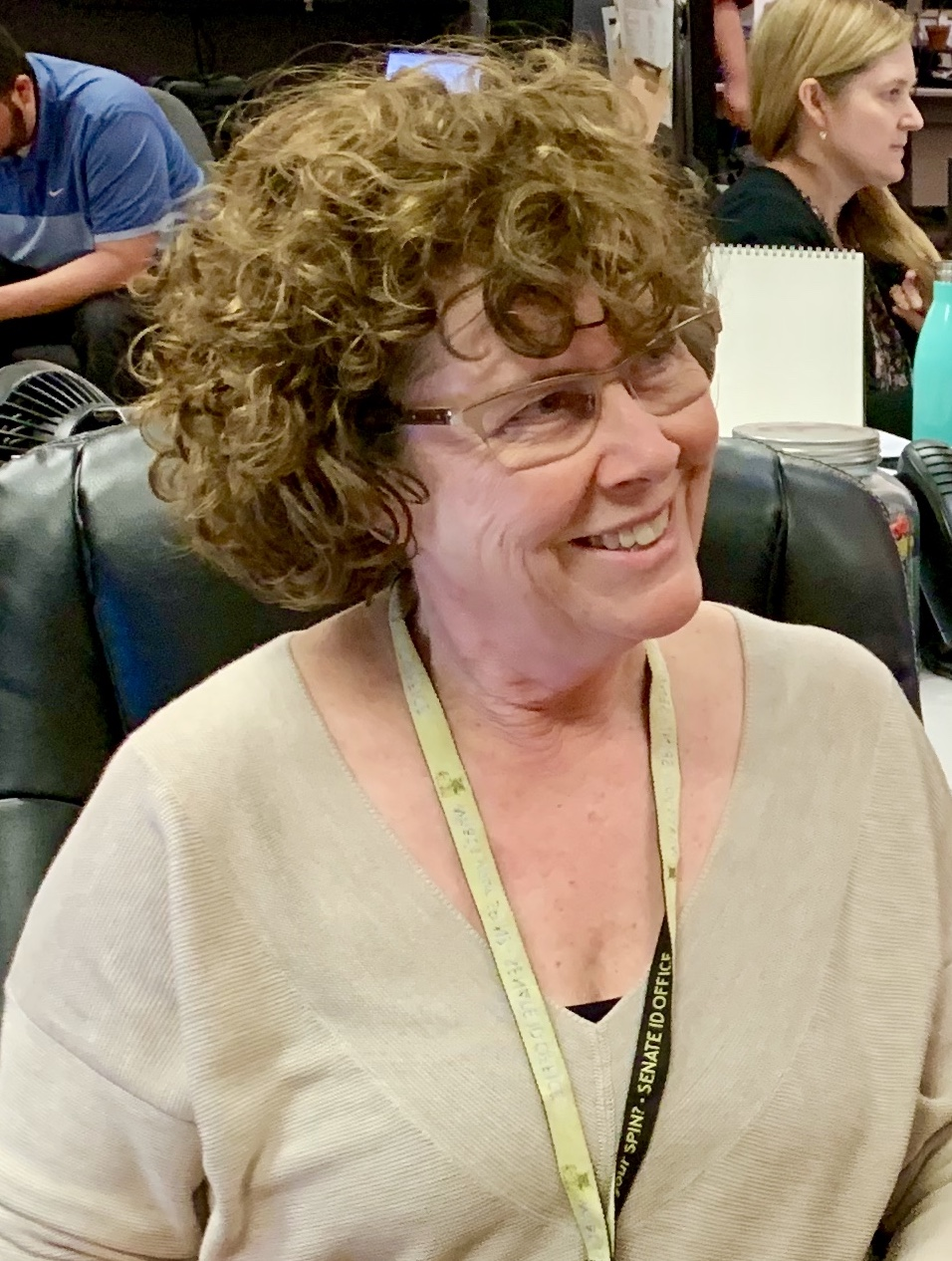
- Citizenship: American
- Education: University of Massachusetts
- Occupation: Journalist
- Employer: Las Vegas Review-Journal
- Spouse: Wesley J. Smith

Debra J. Saunders is a former columnist for the Las Vegas Review-Journal. She returned to the Review-Journal in January 2024 after previously serving as the newspaper's White House correspondent during President Donald Trump's first administration and in the early weeks of President Joe Biden's. Her podcast, "Covering Trump: War Stories from the White House Press Corps," laid out the experience in six episodes. Her column is syndicated by Creators Syndicate and is carried by newspapers in the United States. Saunders served as a fellow with the Discovery Institute's Chapman Center for Citizen Leadership from 2021 through 2023.

== Biography ==
Saunders graduated in 1980 from the University of Massachusetts at Boston. She majored in Greek and Latin.

In 1992, she became an opinion-page columnist for the San Francisco Chronicle, also syndicated by Creators. She later augmented her thrice-weekly columns with the Token Conservative blog, before leaving the paper in 2016.

Between 1987 and 1992, Saunders was a columnist and editorial writer for the Los Angeles Daily News. She previously worked for conservative advocacy groups and for a Republican leader of the California State Assembly.

In addition to her columns, Saunders has written for The Wall Street Journal and The Weekly Standard. She is the author of one book, The World According to Gore (ISBN 1-893554-14-7).

Saunders is married to Wesley J. Smith.

== Views ==
In 2006, Saunders wrote articles opposing the war on drugs. She campaigned in her column for President Bush to issue more pardons and sentence commutations.

Saunders voted against Proposition 22 in 2000. In 2004, Saunders wrote in support of same-sex marriage. However, she was critical of the California Supreme Court decision that legalized same-sex marriage in 2008.

In 2007, she wrote an article that criticized the imprisoned freelance journalist Josh Wolf, although she opposed his imprisonment.

In 2007, Saunders described herself as a climate change skeptic.

In 2011, she wrote about the comic character Foreskin Man, which was being used to promote a ballot initiative to ban circumcision in San Francisco.

Saunders has described herself as a supporter of capital punishment, and has written articles arguing that Kevin Cooper, a death row inmate who has claimed innocence, is in fact guilty.
