= Nexus Project =

Jewish organization addressing antisemitism and Israel-related issues

- Formation: 2019
- Founder: Jonathan Jacoby
- Type: Nonprofit
- Purpose: Issues at the intersection of antisemitism and Israel
- Region served: United States
- Methods: Education and advocacy
- National Director: Jonathan Jacoby
- Project Board: Karen Adler; Ada Horwich; Jonathan Jacoby; Rabbi David Saperstein; Steven Sheffey; Alan Solomont; Alan Solow
- Affiliations: Bard Center for the Study of Hate
- Staff: 11
- Volunteers: 30
- Website: nexusproject.us

The Nexus Project is an American non-profit organization dedicated to combating antisemitism through education, advocacy, and policy implementation. It focuses on promoting effective government action against antisemitism while fostering unity and inclusion. It opposes the use of accusations of antisemitism as a political tool to stifle criticism of Israel. The Nexus Project consists of two main components: the Nexus Leadership Project and the Nexus Task Force.

== Nexus Leadership Project ==
The Nexus Leadership Project, created in January 2024, engages with American civic and political leaders and decision-makers to enhance understanding of antisemitism, particularly where it intersects with Israel-related issues. Its primary activities include educational outreach to policymakers and advocacy for comprehensive strategies to combat antisemitism.

== Nexus Task Force ==
The Nexus Task Force, created in November 2019, analyzes issues at the intersection of Israel and antisemitism. The task force has published the Nexus Document, described as "a resource designed for policymakers and community leaders, aiming to enhance their understanding of the issues that intersect at the nexus of antisemitism, Israel, and Zionism". It has also published the Nexus White Paper, "Understanding Antisemitism at its Nexus with Israel and Zionism"; the Nexus "Guide to Identifying Antisemitism in Debates about Israel"; and "A Campus Guide to Identifying Antisemitism in a Time of Perplexity".

In September 2020, over 100 Jewish leaders sent a letter to Joe Biden to draw his attention to the resources available on the "Israel & Antisemitism: Policy at the Nexus of Two Critical Issues" website.

The Nexus Task Force is affiliated with The Bard Center for the Study of Hate (BCSH), which works to increase the serious study of human hatred, and ways to combat it. The director of the Nexus Task Force is Jonathan Jacoby. The director of the BCSH is Kenneth S. Stern, who had been the lead drafter of the International Holocaust Remembrance Alliance (IHRA)'s working definition of antisemitism and its examples, and is an ex officio member of the Nexus Task Force.

On January 19, 2024, Task Force member Derek Penslar was appointed by Harvard's Interim President Alan Garber to co-chair Harvard's Presidential Task Force on Combating Antisemitism.

=== Nexus Task Force members ===
The members of the Nexus Task Force are listed below.

- Aaron Back
- Steven Beller
- Marla Brettschneider
- Eric Greene
- Rabbi Jocee Hudson
- Jonathan Jacoby
- Ethan B. Katz
- Rabbi Esther L. Lederman
- Lori Lefkowitz
- Analucía Lopezrevoredo
- Isaac Luria
- Derek Penslar
- Norman Rosenberg
- David Schraub
- Joshua Shanes
- Tema Smith
- Kenneth S. Stern (ex officio)
- Mira Sucharov
- Dov Waxman
- Diane Winston

The Nexus Task Force is supported by a larger advisory committee.

== Nexus Document ==
The big mistake people are making about IHRA is that it’s the final word, and there are many words and perspectives ... You can think of IHRA as the Mishnah and Nexus as the Gemara.

— Jonathan Jacoby, The Forward

The Nexus Document, which is based on the Nexus White Paper, states that a determination of whether speech or conduct about Zionism and Israel is antisemitic should be based on the standards for speech or conduct that apply to antisemitic behavior in general. It gives seven examples of what should be deemed antisemitic, followed by four examples of what should not be.

=== Actions considered antisemitic ===
According to the Nexus Document, it is antisemitic:

- To promote myths, stereotypes or attitudes about Zionism or Israel that derive from or reinforce antisemitic accusations and tropes. These include:
  - Characterizing Israel as being part of a sinister world conspiracy of Jewish control of the media, economy, government or other financial, cultural or societal institutions.
  - Indiscriminately blaming suffering and injustices around the world on a hidden Jewish conspiracy or of being the maligning hand of Israel or Zionism.
  - Holding individuals or institutions, because they are Jewish, a priori culpable of real or imagined wrongdoing committed by Israel.
  - Considering Jews to be a priori incapable of setting aside their loyalty to the Jewish people or Israel.
  - Denigrating or denying the Jewish identity of certain Jews because they are perceived as holding the "wrong" position (whether too critical or too favorable) on Israel.
- To use symbols and images that present all Jews as collectively guilty for the actions of the State of Israel.
- To attack or physically harm a Jew because of their relationship to Israel.
- To convey intense hostility toward Jews who are connected to Israel in a way that intentionally or irresponsibly (acting with disregard to potential violent consequences) provokes antisemitic violence.
- To treat Israel in a negative manner based on a claim that Jews alone should be denied the right to define themselves as a people and to exercise any form of self-determination.
- To advocate a political solution that denies Jews the right to define themselves as a people, thereby denying them – because they are Jews – the right to self-determination.
- To treat Israel differently solely because it is a Jewish state, using standards different than those applied to other countries.

=== Actions not considered antisemitic ===
According to the Nexus Document:

- As a general rule, criticism of Israel and Zionism, opposition to Israel's policies, or nonviolent political action directed at the State of Israel or its policies should not, as such, be deemed antisemitic.
- Even contentious, strident, or harsh criticism of Israel for its policies and actions, including those that led to the creation of Israel, is not per se illegitimate or antisemitic.
- Opposition to Zionism or Israel does not necessarily reflect specific anti-Jewish animus nor does it purposefully lead to antisemitic behaviors and conditions. (For example, someone might oppose the principle of nationalism or ethnonationalist ideology. Similarly, someone's personal or national experience may have been adversely affected by the creation of the State of Israel. These motivations or attitudes towards Israel or Zionism do not necessarily constitute antisemitic behavior.)
- Paying disproportionate attention to Israel and treating Israel differently than other countries is not prima facie proof of antisemitism. (There are numerous reasons for devoting special attention to Israel and treating Israel differently – e.g., some people care about Israel more; others may pay more attention because Israel has a special relationship with the United States and receives $4 billion in American aid).

=== Responses to the Nexus Document ===
Haaretz said that the IHRA working definition of antisemitism, the Nexus Task Force definition, and the Jerusalem Declaration on Antisemitism "may have achieved their goal of opening up the conversation, but consensus among Jews on what antisemitism looks like – and how it relates to how Israel is discussed – seems further away than ever".

Ira Forman was mildly critical of the Nexus Task Force and the Jerusalem Declaration on Antisemitism, saying: "These two new definitions focus on issues worthy of debate and analysis. But their guidelines represent the views of a smaller constituency. [...] From a practical perspective, the widespread adoption by dozens of countries, scores of law enforcement organizations and hundreds of governmental, educational and non-profit institutions means we should not relitigate the language of IHRA." He has also said: "There is no doubt that false and reckless charges of antisemitism are a hindrance to the battle against antisemitism. But rather than campaign for an alternative tool, those involved in the fight should support the continued use of the IHRA Definition [...]".

The Forward wrote that "The new definition could serve as an alternative to one from the International Holocaust Remembrance Alliance [...]". Also in The Forward, Mark Goldfeder said that the Nexus Task Force's endeavor "while undoubtedly well-meaning, is unnecessary and possibly dangerous".

An article in The Jerusalem Post stated: "For outsiders to the conflict, it's hard to understand what the fight is about. The IHRA, JDA, and Nexus definitions have many similarities and overlaps. It is in the distinctions, views on double standards, self-determination and legitimate criticism, that counter-antisemitism activists and political activists clash."

In an article discussing whether anti-Zionism is always antisemitic, Jonathan Weisman wrote: "Jonathan Jacoby, the director of the Nexus Task Force, [...] warned that shouting down any political action directed against Israel as antisemitic made it harder for Jews to call out actual antisemitism, while stifling honest conversation about Israel’s government and U.S. policy toward it."

== U.S. National Strategy to Counter Antisemitism ==
The "U.S. National Strategy to Counter Antisemitism" (NSCA), released on May 25, 2023, includes the following paragraph:

There are several definitions of antisemitism, which serve as valuable tools to raise awareness and increase understanding of antisemitism. The most prominent is the non-legally binding "working definition" of antisemitism adopted in 2016 by the 31-member states of the International Holocaust Remembrance Alliance (IHRA), which the United States has embraced. In addition, the Administration welcomes and appreciates the Nexus Document and notes other such efforts.

The inclusion of definitions other than the IHRA definition in the National Strategy to Counter Antisemitism was a topic of heated debate leading up to the Strategy's unveiling. Numerous publications noted that the Nexus Document was included in the National Strategy to Counter Antisemitism, including The New York Times, NPR, Vox, and the Jewish Insider.

=== Responses to the strategy ===
A statement issued by 61 Jewish American leaders praising the National Strategy to Combat Antisemitism, saying: "We are encouraged that the strategy acknowledges the necessity of employing a diverse toolkit to combat antisemitism, including the Nexus Document." Some Jewish organisations criticized the inclusion of the Nexus Document. The Zionist Organization of America called the National Strategy a "lopsided document" because it includes the Nexus Document and insufficiently embraces IHRA's working definition of antisemitism.

B'nai B'rith said it was "disappointed" in the inclusion of the Nexus definition, saying it was inferior to the IHRA working definition and "allows the more invidious of Israel's nemeses to hide their animus behind 'strident' criticism of Israel". Ronald Lauder, head of the World Jewish Congress, said that including "a secondary definition" besides the IHRA working definition was "an unnecessary distraction from the real work that needs to be done". The Anti-Defamation League's CEO, Jonathan Greenblatt, said: "They did welcome the Nexus Document, but they didn’t cite their definition." Instead, he said, "The White House plan elevates and embraces IHRA as the preeminent definition that it is now using to understand antisemitism in all its forms. Whereas previously only the State Department and Department of Education were using it, now it’s the position of the entire administration."

Responding to criticism of the inclusion of the Nexus Document, Deborah Lipstadt, the United States Special Envoy for Monitoring and Combating Antisemitism, said that "there are portions of the Nexus Document which almost are more explicit than the IHRA", such as the examples of what is antisemitic in relation to Israel and Zionism. Lipstadt said: "I think some of the things that have been said about Nexus are not accurate. There were parts in there that some people can see as troublesome. I'm not denying that, but we didn't adopt or embrace Nexus. We recognize that because of where it's explicit there, that is helpful to us."

Following the October 7 attacks in 2023, Nexus Task Force member David Schraub wrote a column with Alan Solow, a former Chairman of the Conference of Presidents of Major American Jewish Organizations, suggesting that the National Antisemitism Strategy was an effective tool for challenging increasing incidents of antisemitism in the United States, because it does not rely solely on the IHRA working definition and supports alliances across political and ideological lines. Former AIPAC executive director Tom Dine, wrote: "The Nexus Document provides a more precise characterization of antisemitism than IHRA's and allows for a broader range of criticism of Israel. In doing so, it lays the groundwork for building a more expansive coalition to combat antisemitism, a coalition that is particularly important at a time like this."

== Second Donald Trump administration ==
Following the election of Donald Trump as president in November 2024, the Nexus Project raised concerns that his administration could weaponize accusations of antisemitism to punish political opponents, suppress academic freedom, and silence legitimate criticism of the Israeli government's actions. Nexus Project National Director Jonathan Jacoby said Trump's incoming administration would "use the idea of fighting antisemitism as a way of suppressing free speech and breaking up coalitions", especially on campuses, with the effect of "dividing Jews from other minorities" and "capitalizing" on divisions rather than aiming "to come to a common understanding".

In an article highlighting Jewish leaders’ priorities and concerns for the second Trump term, Jacoby said, "We expect the incoming Trump administration to aggressively exploit real concerns about Jewish safety for political gain" and warned that the administration could use antisemitism concerns as an excuse to target federal funding for higher education and academic freedom. Nexus said it is committed to differentiating between antisemitic behavior and legitimate political activity, and demonstrating how Jewish students can be best protected using existing civil rights law.

== See also ==
- IHRA definition of antisemitism
