= Anti-Defamation League =

International Jewish organization

- Formation: September 1913; 113 years ago
- Founder: Sigmund Livingston
- Type: Advocacy group
- Tax ID no.: 13-1818723 (EIN)
- Legal status: 501(c)(3) organization
- Headquarters: New York City, U.S.
- Chair: Nicole Mutchnik
- CEO: Jonathan Greenblatt
- Revenue: $38.3 million (2023)
- Expenses: $57.9 million (2023)
- Endowment: $67.1 million (2023)
- Website: www.adl.org
- Formerly called: Anti-Defamation League of B'nai B'rith

The Anti-Defamation League (ADL), formerly known as the Anti-Defamation League of B'nai B'rith, (Note: The ADL became independent of B'nai B'rith and shortened its name in 2009.) is a New York–based international 501(c)(3) nonprofit advocacy group, founded in 1913 with the stated purpose of combating antisemitism and other forms of bigotry and discrimination. The ADL is also known for its pro-Israel advocacy.

The ADL is a non-governmental organization, its CEO is Jonathan Greenblatt, and its headquarters are located in Murray Hill, in the New York City borough of Manhattan. It has 25 regional offices in the United States including a government relations office in Washington, D.C., as well as an office in Israel and staff in Europe. In 2023, the ADL reported total revenue of $38.3 million, the vast majority from contributions and grants. Its operating expenses for 2023 were reported at $57.9 million.

It was founded in late September 1913 by the Independent Order of B'nai B'rith, a Jewish service organization, in the wake of the contentious murder conviction of Leo Frank. In 2009, the ADL became independent from B'nai B'rith and continued as an independent US section 501(c)(3) nonprofit. In an early campaign, the ADL and allied groups pressured the automaker Henry Ford, who had published virulently antisemitic propaganda.

In the 1930s, the ADL worked with the American Jewish Committee (AJC) to oppose pro-Nazi activity in the United States. It campaigned for major civil rights legislation in the 1960s. During this period, it also worked with the NAACP to discredit far-right organizations such as the John Birch Society. In the 1980s, it was involved in propaganda against Nelson Mandela of South Africa before embracing him the following decade.

After the 1967 Arab–Israeli War, and especially with the publication of its 1974 book The New Anti-Semitism, the ADL has sought to popularize the concept of a 'new antisemitism' identifying opposition to Zionism and some criticism of Israel with antisemitism. It has received criticism, including from members of its staff, that such advocacy has diverted the ADL from its historical fight against antisemitism. During the Gaza war and genocide, the ADL under the direct leadership of Greenblatt has been criticized for exploiting the weaponization of antisemitism to delegitimize and silence criticism of Israel.

== History ==
In its early decades, the ADL benefited from being among the few highly centralized Jewish community relations organizations alongside the American Jewish Committee and American Jewish Congress. This characteristic gave these three organizations greater influence on the national Jewish community at a time when most local congregations and organizations were splintered, with little outreach to the broader community. By the 1970s, decentralization yielded greater influence. By this point the ADL had succeeded in developing local branches, though the central office remained significant even in terms of local branch activities.

=== Origins ===
The ADL was founded in late September 1913 by B'nai B'rith, with Sigmund Livingston as its first leader. Its goals were to counter antisemitism, prejudice and discrimination. Initially the league largely represented Midwestern and Southern Jews concerned with antagonistic portrayals of Jews in popular culture along with social and economic discrimination. In 1913, Atlanta B'nai B'rith President Leo Frank was convicted of the murder of a 13-year-old employee at a factory where he was superintendent; historians today generally consider Frank to have been innocent. Jewish leadership viewed Frank as having been wrongly prosecuted and convicted because of local antisemitism and agitation by some of the local press. The role that prejudice played in Frank's conviction was mentioned by Adolf Kraus when he announced the creation of the ADL. The ADL's early strategy would be to pressure newspapers, theaters, and other businesses seen as defaming or discriminating against Jews; proposed methods included boycotts and pressuring advertisers, and it also considered demanding prior reviews of theater productions for antisemitism. After Georgia's outgoing governor commuted Frank's death sentence to life imprisonment in 1915, a lynch mob abducted Frank from prison and killed him. Frank was granted a posthumous pardon from Georgia in 1986 after ADL requests.

=== 1920s through 1960s ===
The historian Leonard Dinnerstein writes that until after World War II, the ADL had limited impact, particularly less than the American Jewish Committee (AJC). One of the ADL's early campaigns occurred in the 1920s when it organized a media effort and consumer boycott against The Dearborn Independent, a publication published by American automobile industrialist Henry Ford. The publication contained virulently antisemitic articles and quoted heavily from The Protocols of the Elders of Zion, an antisemitic hoax. The ADL and allied organizations pressured Ford until he issued an apology in 1927.

In 1933, the ADL moved offices to Chicago and Richard E. Gutstadt became director of national activities. With the change in leadership, the ADL shifted from Livingston's reactive responses to antisemitic action to a much more aggressive policy.

During the 1930s, the ADL, along with the AJC, coordinated American Jewish groups across the country in monitoring the activities of the German-American Bund and its pro-Nazi, nativist allies in the United States. In many instances, these community-based defense organizations paid informants to infiltrate these groups and report on what they discovered. The longest-lived and most effective of these American Jewish resistance organizations was the Los Angeles Jewish Community Committee (LAJCC), which was backed financially by the Jewish leaders of the motion picture industry. The day-to-day operations of the LAJCC were supervised by a Jewish attorney, Leon L. Lewis. Lewis was uniquely qualified to combat the rise of Nazism in Los Angeles, having served as the first national secretary of the Anti-Defamation League in Chicago from 1925 to 1931. From 1934 to 1941, the LAJCC maintained its undercover surveillance of the German-American Bund, the Silver Shirts and dozens of other pro-Nazi, nativist groups that operated in Los Angeles. Partnering with the American Legion in Los Angeles, the LAJCC channeled eyewitness accounts of sedition on to federal authorities. Working with the ADL, Leon Lewis and the LAJCC played a strategic role in counseling the McCormack-Dickstein Committee investigation of Nazi propaganda activities in the United States (1934) and the Dies Committee investigation of "un-American activities" (1938–1940). In their final reports to Congress, both committees found that the sudden rise in political antisemitism in the United States during the decade was due, in part, to the German government's support of these domestic groups.

Paralleling its infiltration efforts, the ADL continued its attempts to reduce antisemitic caricatures in the media. Much like the NAACP, it chose a non-confrontational approach, attempting to build long-lasting relationships and avoid backlash. The ADL requested its members avoid public confrontation, instead directing them to send letters to the media and advertising companies that included antisemitic or racist references in screening copies of their books and movies. This strategy kept the campaigns out of the public eye and instead emphasized the development of a relationship with companies.

During the Second Red Scare, the ADL expelled Jewish communists from the organization, cooperated with the House Un-American Activities Committee, and supported the execution of Julius and Ethel Rosenberg. The ADL rejected accusations that the Rosenberg trial was influenced by antisemitism. Judge Irving Kaufman, who ordered the execution of the Rosenbergs, was a member of the ADL's Civil Rights committee. In 1952, Lucy Dawidowicz wrote in Commentary that Jewish communists viewed the ADL and other mainstream Jewish organizations as "reactionary, fascist-collaborating oligarchs and conspiratorial enemies both of democracy and their own oppressed people." In 1952, the ADL and other Jewish organizations released a joint statement rejecting the claims of the National Committee to Secure Justice in the Rosenberg Case that the trial was motivated by antisemitism. The statement characterized the Rosenberg Committee as trying to "inject the false issue of anti-Semitism". A 1952 ADL document claimed that "The Communists, in their worldwide propaganda attack defending the convicted atom spies, Ethel and Julius Rosenberg, provide a vivid example of the technique of falsely charging anti-Semitism to hide conspiracy."

The ADL campaigned for civil rights legislation including the Civil Rights Act of 1964 and the Voting Rights Act of 1965. The ADL and the NAACP worked together to discredit the far right in the United States. According to Mathew Delleck, author of a history of the US far right in this period, the ADL, leading a multi-racial liberal coalition, was perhaps the most effective group in discrediting extremist right wing elements in the United States. The ADL conducted a spy operation headed by Isadore Zack, against the far right.

After the 1967 Arab–Israeli War, the ADL, with the support of AIPAC founder Isaiah L. Kenen, "sought to portray certain 'anti-Israel' actions as anti-Semitic", especially with regard to international calls for Israel to end its occupation of the West Bank, according to historian Ilan Pappé. From the early 1970s, the ADL sought to popularize a discourse of 'new antisemitism' identifying anti-Zionism with antisemitism.

=== 1970s and 1980s ===
In 1973, Nathan Perlmutter took the role of national director, serving until his death in 1987. Under the tenure of Perlmutter and his 1978–1983 co-director of interreligious affairs Yechiel Eckstein, the ADL shifted its approach to the evangelical Christian movement. Through the 60s and early 70s, the ADL had conflicted with the American Jewish Congress over their collaborations with evangelicals. Perlmutter and Eckstein changed this orientation, increasing collaborations and developing long-lasting lines of communication between the ADL and evangelical groups. This collaboration continued under the Foxman administration.

==== The New Anti-Semitism ====
After the 1967 Arab–Israeli War, the ADL—with the support of AIPAC founder Isaiah L. Kenen, according to historian Ilan Pappé—sought to "portray certain 'anti-Israel' actions as anti-Semitic" especially with regard to international calls for Israel to end its occupation of the West Bank.

In 1974, ADL leaders Arnold Forster and Benjamin Epstein published the book The New Anti-Semitism, in which they present the term 'new antisemitism' (Note: The spelling without hyphenation is preferred according to the International Holocaust Remembrance Alliance, because the spelling with hyphenation implies that "Semitism" is a valid concept.) and the idea that a new form of discrimination against Jews has emerged, especially with regard to Zionism and the State of Israel. The book has been criticized for conflating anti-Zionism—opposition to Zionism—with antisemitism—discrimination against Jews.

In the 1970s, the ADL partnered with Federal Bureau of Investigation (FBI) field offices, sharing information learned from the monitoring of extremist groups.

In 1977, the ADL opened a headquarters in Jerusalem.

It opposed an anti-Mormon film called The God Makers in 1982, viewing it a challenge to religious freedom.

=== 1990s ===
The ADL released a 1991 report observing an increase in the use of public access television stations by extremist groups. The report came in the wake of the trial of Tom Metzger, a white supremacist leader found civilly liable for inciting a murder.

San Francisco police searched two offices of the ADL in April 1993, suspecting it of having monitored thousands of activists; in the search, they confiscated police records including fingerprints and copies of confidential reports, according to court documents. The San Francisco district attorney considered indictments, but settled with the ADL in November 1993 in exchange for the ADL paying $75,000 for use fighting hate crimes. During the investigation, a private investigator hired by the ADL, Roy H. Bullock, told police he had tracked skinheads, white supremacists, Arab Americans, and critics of Israel. He confessed to trying to find "any sexual impropriety" on the late anti-apartheid activist Desmond Tutu. In court documents, state officials said that the ADL conspired to obtain the confidential police material, a felony in California, and that the ADL had violated state tax laws by paying Bullock through a lawyer. The court documents said the ADL had a network of sympathetic police officers sharing data, and that investigators had questioned police about free sponsored trips to Israel they received from the ADL. The documents also mentioned that the ADL's spying operations were reported to the Israeli government and its intelligence agencies. The ADL's Foxman contended that the ADL had a right to use the police information to combat antisemitism, and he argued in an interview that allegations that the ADL acted as an agent for Israel were "antisemitic".

News of the investigation led Arab Americans listed in the ADL's files to sue the ADL, contending invasion of privacy and the forwarding of confidential information to Israel and South Africa. In 1996, ADL settled the federal civil lawsuit filed by groups representing African Americans and Arab Americans. The ADL did not admit any wrongdoing but agreed to a restraining injunction barring it from obtaining information from state employees who cannot legally disclose such information. The ADL agreed to contribute $25,000 to a fund that funds inter-community relationship projects, and cover the plaintiffs' legal costs of $175,000. It settled with three remaining plaintiffs in 2002 for $178,000.

In 1994, ADL became involved in a dispute between neighbors in Denver, Colorado. The Aronson family reported this dispute to the ADL, which involved the Quigley family making antisemitic comments. The ADL advised the Aronsons to record the Quigleys' private telephone conversations via a police scanner. These recordings were legal at the time, but federal wiretap law was amended shortly after to make it illegal to record conversations from a cordless telephone, to transcribe the material, and to use the transcriptions for any purpose. ADL Regional Director Saul Rosenthal described the recorded remarks as part of a "vicious antisemitic campaign". This led to the family being ridiculed and excluded in their community and to career damage. These recordings were used as basis for a federal civil lawsuit against the Aronson family and the ADL for defamation. The Quigleys and Aronsons settled out-of-court, and a jury awarded the Quigleys $10 million in damages from the ADL.

This was the first-ever verdict against the ADL. Only once before had the League been subject to a defamation trial, a case it won in 1984. Other cases were dismissed before reaching trial. The ADL appealed the case to a superior court, which upheld the verdict, and the Supreme Court ultimately declined to take the case. The ADL paid the original $10 million plus interest in 2004.

=== 2000s ===
In 2003, the ADL opposed an advertising campaign by People for the Ethical Treatment of Animals (PETA) called "Holocaust on Your Plate" that compared animals killed in the meat industry to victims of the Holocaust. In 2005, PETA apologized for causing distress to the Jewish community through the campaign, though in 2008, the Chief Rabbinate announced that it was planning to gradually phase out the use of the "shackle and hoist" method of kosher slaughter in Israel and South America, in part in response to pressure from PETA.

The ADL's 2003 Distinguished Statesman Award was awarded to Silvio Berlusconi, sitting Italian prime minister at the time. The decision caused significant backlash, with three Nobel laureates protesting the decision, as reported by the Haaretz. The Forward called the decision "a disservice [to] itself and the American Jewish community" in an opinion piece, noting Berlusconi to have a "sordid record on fascism", with his referring to Benito Mussolini's rule as "benign". It noted Berlusconi government's coalition with the conservative National Alliance, describing the cooperation as "whitewashing" and the party as "Mussolini's heirs". It commented that ADL has weakened its own authority, "by suggesting the league can no longer differentiate between right and wrong". Writing for Observer.com in 2004, Phoebe Eaton discussed ADL's connection with right-wing politics, noting Berlusconi's award as an example.

As of 2007, the ADL said it was archiving MySpace pages associated with white supremacists as part of its effort to track extremism.

The ADL opposed 2008 California Proposition 8, a successful ballot initiative that banned same-sex marriage. It did so alongside Jewish organizations, including the National Council of Jewish Women and the Progressive Jewish Alliance. The ADL filed amicus briefs urging the Supreme Court of California, Ninth Circuit, and the Supreme Court to invalidate Prop 8. (Proposition 8 was later ruled unconstitutional and subsequently repealed.) In 2015, the ADL opposed the State Religious Freedom Restoration Acts, state laws that used the United States Supreme Court decision in Burwell v. Hobby Lobby Stores, Inc. recognizing a for-profit corporation's claim of religious belief. The ADL opposed these laws out of concern they largely targeted LGBT people or denied access to contraceptives to employees of religiously owned businesses.

The ADL became independent from B'nai B'rith in 2009, dropping the reference to the other organization in its name.

=== 2010s ===
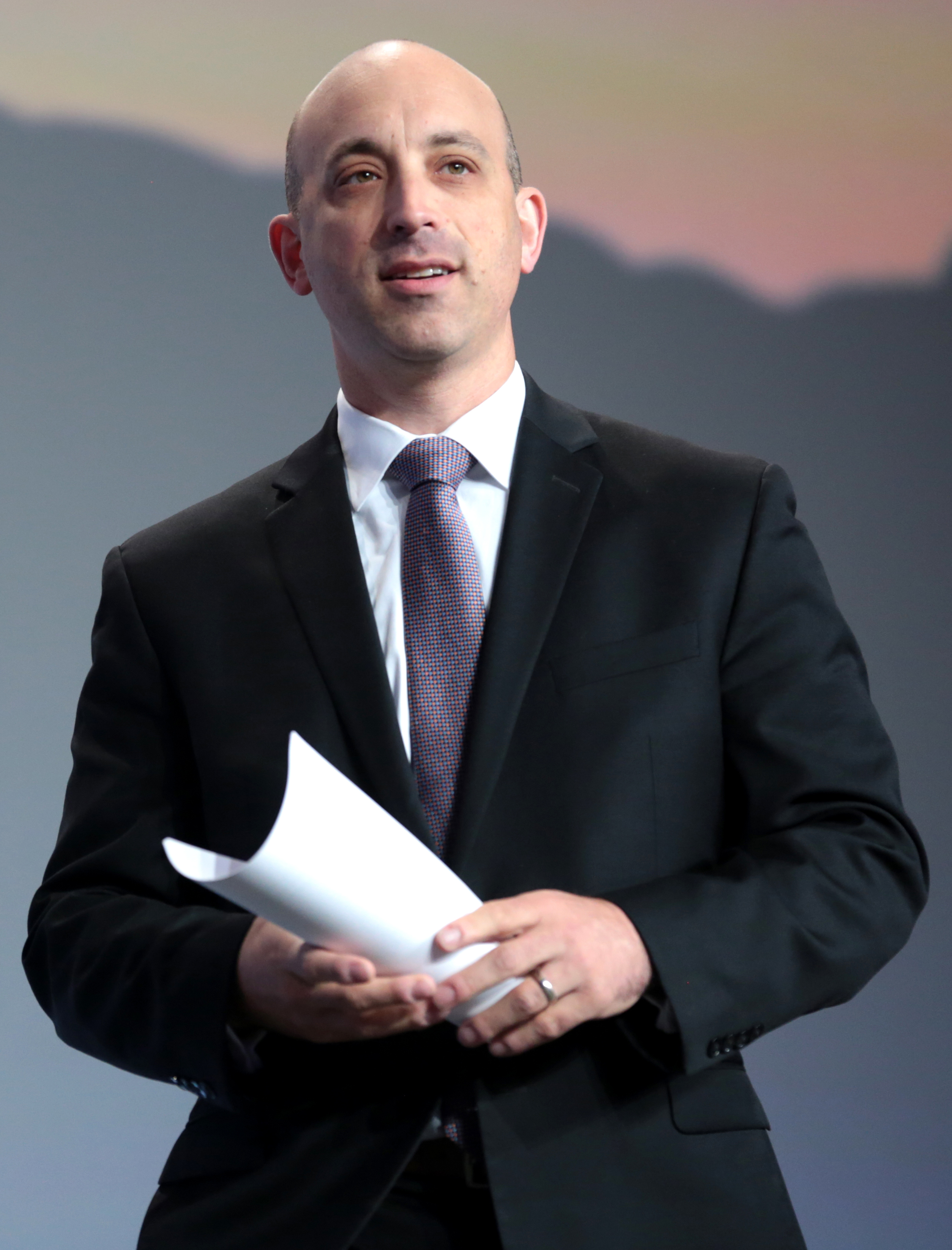
Greenblatt in 2017

The ADL was one of the groups that opposed the Shelby County v. Holder decision by the Supreme Court in 2013 to strike down a portion of the Voting Rights Act. The court's decision ended the portion of the law that required states with a history of discrimination to undergo federal scrutiny for election rules.

In November 2014, the organization announced that Jonathan Greenblatt, a former Silicon Valley tech executive and former Obama administration official who had not operated within the Jewish communal organization world prior to his hiring, would succeed Abraham Foxman as national director in July 2015. Foxman had served as national director since 1987. The ADL board of directors renewed Greenblatt's contract as CEO and national director in fall 2020 for a second five-year term. In 2018, Esta Gordon Epstein was elected to a three-year term as national chair of the ADL's governing board of directors; she was the second woman to hold the organization's top volunteer leadership post.

The ADL repeatedly accused Donald Trump, when he was a presidential candidate in 2016, of making use of antisemitic tropes or otherwise exploiting divisive and bigoted rhetoric during the 2016 presidential election campaign. The ADL accused President Trump of politicizing charges of antisemitism for partisan purposes, and for continued use of antisemitic tropes. The ADL said it was facing a discredit campaign for its criticism of Trump.

In mid-2018, the ADL raised concerns over President Donald Trump's nomination of then-DC Circuit Court of Appeals judge Brett Kavanaugh as an Associate Justice of the United States Supreme Court. Subsequently, in another move that enraged many on the right, the ADL called for the resignation or firing of Trump administration official Stephen Miller, the architect of the administration's immigration policy, on the basis of his association with white supremacists.

The ADL says it has participated in YouTube's Trusted Flagger program and has encouraged YouTube to remove videos that they flag as hate speech, citing the need to "fight against terrorist use of online resources and cyberhate". The ADL's Center on Technology and Society launched a survey in 2019 exploring online harassment in video games. It found that the majority of surveyed players experienced severe harassment of some kind, and the ADL recommended increased content moderation from game companies and governments. On the other hand, the survey found that over half of players experienced some form of positive community in video games. A separate, earlier survey of the general population found that around a third of people have experienced some form of online harassment.

In July 2017, the ADL announced that they would be developing profiles on 36 alt-right and alt-lite leaders.

In a report from 2018, the ADL noted that the majority of domestic extremist-related murders in the United States over the past decade had been committed by white supremacists. Also in 2018, the ADL created an interactive database called the H.E.A.T. Map (Hate, Extremism, Antisemitism, and Terrorism) that is intended to display reported hate and extremism incidents across the United States. The tool allows users to filter incidents by location, incident type, ideological affiliation, and date range.

In 2019 and 2020, ADL executives and staff testified multiple times in front of congressional committees concerning the dangers of right-wing domestic extremists.

=== 2020s ===
In 2020, the ADL joined with the NAACP, Color of Change, LULAC, Free Press, the National Hispanic Media Coalition and other organizations in the Stop Hate For Profit campaign. The campaign targeted online hate on Facebook, with over 1000 businesses pausing their ad buys on Facebook for a month. Subsequently, in September 2020, the campaign organized celebrity supporters including Sacha Baron Cohen, Kim Kardashian, and Mark Ruffalo.

In 2020, the ADL trained staff to edit Wikipedia pages, but after the project caused Wikipedia editors to criticize this as a conflict of interest, the ADL said it suspended the project in April 2021. At the time, the ADL was considered a reliable source on Wikipedia, and the ADL said its staff complied with Wikipedia policies by disclosing their affiliations, but some Wikipedia editors objected that the project cited ADL sources disproportionately and did not reflect the volunteer spirit of the website, especially in heavily editing its own Wikipedia article.

An internal email obtained by The Guardian in 2024 showed that in May 2020, the ADL had surveilled and produced a "threat assessment" report on a Black Indianapolis activist who worked with the Deadly Exchange campaign in opposition to exchange programs between American and Israeli police. The email contained a photo and personal information about the activist. The ADL employee who shared the email with The Guardian said that "threat assessments" are conducted regularly by the ADL and that many staff members opposed the spying.

In early January 2021, the ADL called for the removal of Donald Trump as president in response to the United States Capitol attack and described the relationship of the storming of the Capitol to the far-right and antisemitic groups. In April 2021, Jonathan Greenblatt released a letter calling on the right-wing American network Fox News to drop commentator Tucker Carlson from its lineup, saying that Carlson had espoused the white genocide conspiracy theory on his show. This call appeared shortly after research indicating that many who participated in the 2021 storming of the United States Capitol had been influenced by this conspiracy theory. The ADL again called for Carlson to be fired in September 2021 following Carlson expressing support for the great replacement theory. Carlson responded, saying "Fuck them" regarding the ADL, describing the ADL's call as politically motivated and defending his statements. In 2023, Fox dropped Carlson, a move welcomed by ADL leadership.

In 2022, the ADL revised its 2020 definition of racism from "the marginalization and/or oppression of people of color based on a socially constructed racial hierarchy that privileges White people" to occurrence "when individuals or institutions show more favorable evaluation or treatment of an individual or group based on race or ethnicity".

Also in 2022, the ADL published an analysis of a leaked list of members of Oath Keepers, an American far-right, anti-government militia. Of 38,000 names on that list, the ADL identified "at least 373 Oath Keepers currently serving in law enforcement", plus 117 active duty military, and 1,100 former law enforcement officers.

In November 2022, the ADL acquired JLens, a pro-Israel advocacy group started in 2012 which campaigns against incentives for economic disengagement with Israel in environmental, social, and corporate governance (ESG) investing guidelines. JLens publishes company rankings based on participation in boycotts of Israel and publishes guidelines on investing used by around 30 Jewish companies with portfolios totaling around $200 million. JLens launched a campaign criticizing Morningstar, Inc., a campaign the ADL collaborated on prior to the 2020 acquisition. The ADL said it would contribute funding to JLens.

In a 2023 report, white supremacists were deemed responsible for 45% of right-wing extremism in the US from 2017 to 2022. Also in 2023, the ADL created the J7 Task Force, a coalition of Jewish organizations from seven countries formed to coordinate international responses to antisemitism. The group released a 2025 report that found an increase in antisemitic incidents in seven countries which have the largest Jewish populations outside of Israel.

The ADL tracked rapid growth in hate speech and harassment on Twitter after Elon Musk bought the social network in 2022. In early September 2023, Musk liked and replied to a tweet by the Irish white nationalist Keith Woods that called for banning the ADL from X, which was Twitter's new name under Musk. Musk also accused the ADL of defamation and threatened to sue it, writing that advertising revenue was "still down 60%, primarily due to pressure on advertisers by @ADL (that's what advertisers tell us), so they almost succeeded in killing X/Twitter!" The ADL said as a matter of policy it did not comment on legal threats, but that it had recently met with X leadership including CEO Linda Yaccarino, who had thanked the ADL's CEO on the platform. Greenblatt later praised Musk after he announced policy banning phrases such as "decolonization" and "from the river to the sea" on Twitter. Multiple ADL board members threatened to quit over the organization's praise for Musk, and Yael Eisenstat, a top ADL executive, resigned; many working with the ADL have described Greenblatt's support for Musk as undermining the organization's ability to focus on right-wing antisemitism online.

In September 2023, the ADL launched a media and entertainment institute aimed at combating antisemitism and improving depictions of Jewish people in entertainment. The institute works with industry leaders and non-profit organizations such as Common Sense Media. In February 2024, the institute appointed documentary producer and journalist Deborah Camiel as its leader.

==== Gaza war and genocide ====
During the Gaza war and genocide, the Anti-Defamation League under Jonathan Greenblatt has been accused of exploiting the accusation of antisemitism to silence criticism of Israel.

On October 25, Greenblatt of the ADL and Alyza D. Lewin and Kenneth L. Marcus of the Brandeis Center wrote university presidents a letter calling on them to investigate Students for Justice in Palestine for "potential violations of the prohibition against materially supporting a foreign terrorist organization", adding that "universities must also update their code of conduct to ensure that harassment and support for terrorism have no place on campus". According to The Nation columnist Spencer Ackerman, "The ADL provided not a shred of evidence for that incendiary, potentially life-ruining accusation."

In December 2023, ADL staff were informed that the anti-bias education program A World of Difference (AWOD) was ended. The program was founded in 1985 to address bias in all forms and was integrated into school curricula both in the United States and internationally. Curricula materials and other anti-bias resources were removed from the website. Staff members were either laid off or reassigned to antisemitism education.

The Intercept reported in 2025 that Greenblatt has "shored up the ADL's role as little more than a fierce pro-Israel lobby group known for defending Israel by attacking its critics. With no sense of irony, much of this effort manifests as defamatory speech — at least in the everyday, if not the legal, sense — by Greenblatt." In June 2025, the ADL laid off 22 employees as part of a shift away from broader civil rights work in favor of focusing on antisemitism.

In September 2025, the ADL deleted its "Glossary of Extremism", which contained thousands of entries on neo-Nazi groups, militias and antisemitic conspiracies, after facing criticism by Elon Musk. Musk called it a "hate group" and accused it of being anti-Christian in nature. The attacks came after the assassination of Charlie Kirk brought new attention to the ADL's historical work on right wing antisemitism. Following the backlash from Musk and other prominent conservatives, the FBI cut ties with the ADL and Director Kash Patel made a statement condemning the ADL. Some former employees blamed the organization's shift of focus to combating pro-Palestinian activism for alienating progressive groups, few of which criticized the FBI's decision.

In October 2025, the ADL announced the launch of a national legal service network to support victims of antisemitism and provide legal counsel on a pro-bono basis. One of the nation's largest law firms, Gibson, Dunn & Crutcher, announced its participation in partnership with the ADL. A total of 40 law firms in the United States agreed to join the network, providing a pool of 39,000 attorneys. That month, it removed a statement stating that it would protect civil rights from its website.

Following Zohran Mamdani's victory in the 2025 New York City mayoral election, the ADL announced a 'Mamdani Monitor' to "track and monitor Mamdani administration policies and appointments" with regard to matters it says "impact Jewish community safety and security". Greenblatt accused Mamdani of antisemitism, saying he had "demonstrated intense animosity toward" Israel. Fact-checking website Misbar called the accusations of antisemitism against Mamdani baseless. Nexus Project director Jonathan Jacoby criticized the ADL for what he called its "divisive, hyperbolic and aggressive response" to Mamdani's election. Mamdani said in response to the announcement that "anyone is free to catalog the actions of our administration. I have some doubts about Jonathan's ability to do so honestly, given that he previously said I had not visited any synagogues, only to have to correct himself."

In December 2025, Catherine Almonte Da Costa resigned from her role as Mamdani's director of appointments after the ADL resurfaced antisemitic social media posts made by Da Costa when she was a teenager. Mamdani's transition team said it would revamp its vetting process. Several days later, the ADL announced that it had dug into the social media histories of over 400 individual members of Mamdani's transition committee and identified social media postings about Israel and Zionism. Mamdani said the ADL's report often ignores the distinction between antisemitism and criticism of the Israeli government, which distracts from what he called "the very real crisis of antisemitism we see not only just in our city but in the country at large". J Street criticised the ADL's report and said it was "deeply concerned by the ADL's ongoing use of its so-called 'Mamdani Monitor', which goes well beyond combating antisemitism and too often conflates legitimate political speech with hate".

== Political positions ==
=== Israel ===
The ADL is described as a pro-Israel group. The Middle East historian Asaf Romirowsky described the organization as "left of center" politically.

The ADL has taken a case-by-case approach to state anti-BDS laws enacted in response to the BDS movement. Several of these laws, which seek to prohibit state agencies and instrumentalities from investing in companies that boycott Israel and from entering into contracts with entities that boycott Israel, have been successfully challenged in the courts. The legal challenges have primarily been brought by the ACLU and CAIR on First Amendment constitutional grounds. As a general matter the organization also has not publicly opposed such state laws, preferring to work behind the scenes to try to make such laws less infirm under the Constitution or to propose non-binding resolutions opposing BDS. A possible division of internal views in the ADL was disclosed when the liberal Jewish publication The Forward published ostensible leaked internal ADL staff memos dating from 2016 that opposed the anti-boycott laws. The ADL did not comment directly on the leaked memos, but the statement it issued in response appeared to acknowledge both that there were sharply divided views within the organization and that the organization did not try to suppress internal robust discussion.

In 2010, the ADL published a list of the "ten leading organizations responsible for maligning Israel in the US", which included ANSWER, the International Solidarity Movement, and Jewish Voice for Peace for its call for BDS. The ADL published a similar list in 2013.

Alongside similar statements from StandWithUs and American Jewish Committee representatives, Greenblatt condemned the United Nations Human Rights Council's (UNHRC) list of companies doing business with Israeli settlements in the occupied territories, issued in February 2020, calling it a "blacklist".

The ADL expressed concern over Israeli legislative proposals requiring that NGOs publicize if they receive funding primarily from non-Israeli governments, a bill mostly opposed by centrist and left-wing and supported by right-wing Jewish American groups.

In 2020, Jewish Currents reported on a leaked ADL memo detailing its planned response to Israel's preparations to annex parts of the West Bank. The memo indicated that the ADL hoped to avoid appearing overtly hostile to criticism of annexation while blocking legislation that harshly censured Israel, and that it was planning to find a way to credibly defend Israel from accusations that it is an apartheid state.

In 2022, the ADL criticized the government formed by Benjamin Netanyahu in his sixth term, which included representatives from the far-right Otzma Yehudit and Religious Zionist Party, and their leaders, Itamar Ben-Gvir and Bezalel Smotrich. The ADL said that including these parties and lawmakers "would run counter to Israel's founding principles, and impact its standing, even among its strongest supporters".

=== Anti-Zionism and antisemitism ===
In a 2022 speech to ADL leaders, Greenblatt said that "anti-Zionism is antisemitism". The Times of Israel noted that the "speech marked a rare moment of the organization unequivocally" making that assertion. The remarks upset activists and Jewish groups critical of Israel, and also set off controversy within the ADL. Internal ADL messages seen by The Guardian included a senior manager at the ADL's Center on Extremism writing in protest that: "There is no comparison between white supremacists and insurrectionists and those who espouse anti-Israel rhetoric, and to suggest otherwise is both intellectually dishonest and damaging to our reputation as experts in extremism." The newspaper reported that the speech, which "put opposition to Israel on a par with white supremacy as a source of antisemitism", had sparked controversy.

In January 2024, two-thirds of the ADL's tally of more than 3,283 antisemitic incidents in the United States since October 7, 2023, were tied to the Gaza war; The Forward said the ADL acknowledged "that it significantly broadened its definition of antisemitic incidents following the October 7 attacks to include rallies that feature 'anti-Zionist chants and slogans', events that appear to account for around 1,317 of the total count". The ADL classified anti-war protest events led by Jewish groups, including Jewish Voice for Peace and IfNotNow, as "anti-Israel" and included the protests in a database documenting rising antisemitism in the US. In response, an ADL staffer quit, who told The Guardian that "These were Jewish people who we [as the ADL] were defaming, so that felt extremely, extremely confusing, and frustrating to me. And it makes it harder to talk about that when any criticism of Israel, or anyone who criticizes Israel, just becomes a terrorist." In 2023, the ADL told The Intercept that it did not consider the protests antisemitic, but Greenblatt labelled the protesting groups as hate groups. Former staff told The Daily Beast in 2023 of dissent within the ADL over the increasing equation of anti-Zionism and antisemitism, and over Greenblatt's calls for bans and investigations of pro-Palestinian organizations that he alleged had supported terrorist groups. In early 2024, two ADL staff quit the group in response to its pro-Israel advocacy during the war.

The ADL supported a December 5, 2023, US Congress resolution that described anti-Zionism as antisemitism. The ADL and "many other Jewish establishment organizations" have campaigned for governments to adopt the International Holocaust Remembrance Alliance definition of antisemitism, which describes anti-Zionism and some forms of criticism of Israel as antisemitic, according to The Guardian. The Nexus Task Force criticizes the ADL's position that anti-Zionism is antisemitism.

Critics of the ADL said that such advocacy for Israel had undermined the group's counter-extremism work and argued that it had foregone parts of its historical mission against antisemitism. In 2024, James Bamford said in The Nation that "The ADL's priority today remains—as it has for decades—going after Americans who are simply opposed to Israel's endless occupation and oppression of Palestinians", and criticized what it described as US media outlets using ADL reports on antisemitism uncritically. Middle East historian Asaf Romirowsky said that, because the ADL's clear stance on antisemitism does not conform to the "orthodoxy of the day", it has led to the discredition of the group whose purpose is to combat antisemitism. Jay Michaelson argues that "When the Anti-Defamation League redefines the term 'antisemitism' to include any anti-Zionist protest, its own data — which used to be the authoritative reference for tracking this noxious bigotry — now becomes unreliable". Jonathan Jacoby of the Nexus Project criticised the ADL's portrayal of left-wing antisemitism as "mortal danger": "This obfuscation of right- and left-wing antisemitism is a grave mistake. It... detracts from the critical role ADL and other groups play in countering right-wing antisemites, from Marjorie Taylor Greene to Kanye West to Donald Trump.

=== New antisemitism ===
In 1974, ADL attorney Arnold Forster and national director Benjamin Epstein published the book The New Anti-Semitism. They expressed concern about what they described as new manifestations of antisemitism coming from radical left, radical right, and pro-Arab figures in the US. Forster and Epstein argued that radical left antisemitism took the form of indifference to the fears of the Jewish people, apathy in dealing with anti-Jewish bias, and an inability to understand the importance of Israel to Jewish survival. A subsequent book, The Real Anti-Semitism in America, published in 1982, was written by ADL national leader Nathan Perlmutter and his wife, Ruth Ann Perlmutter.

Reviewing Forster and Epstein's work in 1974 for the neoconservative magazine Commentary, Earl Raab, founding director of the Nathan Perlmutter Institute for Jewish Advocacy at Brandeis University, agreed that a "new anti-Semitism" was indeed emerging in America in the form of opposition to the supposed collective rights of the Jewish people, but Raab criticized Forster and Epstein for "stretch[ing] the word in practice to mean anti-Israel bias in general". Allan Brownfeld, a columnist with The Lincoln Review, wrote in the Journal of Palestine Studies 1987 that Forster and Epstein's new definition of antisemitism trivialized the concept by turning it into "a form of political blackmail" and "a weapon with which to silence any criticism of either Israel or US policy in the Middle East", while Edward S. Shapiro, in A Time for Healing: American Jewry Since World War II, has written that, "Forster and Epstein implied that the new antisemitism was the inability of Gentiles to love Jews and Israel enough."

In 2005, Norman Finkelstein wrote that organizations such as the Anti-Defamation League have brought forward charges of new antisemitism at various intervals since the 1970s, "not to fight antisemitism, but rather to exploit the historical suffering of Jews in order to immunize Israel against criticism". The Washington Post reported in 2006 that the ADL had over the years repeatedly accused Finkelstein of being a "Holocaust denier", and that "these charges have proved baseless". (Note: The terms the ADL website uses to describe Finkelstein are "an anti-Israel academic whose career has been marked by a vitriolic hatred of Zionism and Israel", "anti-Israel academic", "political scientist", and "an anti-Israel speaker".)

=== Circumcision ===
The ADL has opposed efforts in the US and in Europe to ban circumcision of minors on the grounds of parental and religious freedom, citing the importance of circumcision in Judaism and Islam. The ADL has also criticized specific instances of anti-circumcision imagery, such as an anti-circumcision cartoon in the Norwegian newspaper Dagbladet and the comic book Foreskin Man. Regarding the latter, Associate Regional Director Nancy Appel stated that while good people could disagree on the issue of circumcision, it was unacceptable to use antisemitic imagery within the debate. In 2018, Greenblatt sent Iceland's Parliament a letter regarding a proposed infant circumcision ban in that country, arguing that the ban should be rejected due to circumcision's religious significance and health benefits. Greenblatt also said that if the ban passed, the ADL would report on any celebration by antisemites and other extremists, asserting that this would deter tourism and harm Iceland's economy. The Reykjavík Grapevine described this letter as a threat.

=== Federal and state legislation ===
The ADL was among the lead organizations campaigning for thirteen years, ultimately successfully, for the Matthew Shepard and James Byrd Jr. Hate Crimes Prevention Act. The hold-up in passing that law focused on the inclusion of the term "sexual orientation" as one of the bases that a crime could be deemed a hate crime. The ADL also drafted the model hate crimes legislation in the 1980s; it serves as a model for the legislation that a majority of states have adopted.

In 2010, during a hearing for Florida House Bill 11 (Crimes Against Homeless Persons), which was to revise the list of offenses judged to be hate crimes in Florida by adding a person's homeless status, the League lobbied against the bill, which subsequently passed in the House by a vote of 80 to 28 and was sent to the Senate, taking the position that adding more categories to the list would dilute the effectiveness of the law, which already includes race, religion, sexual orientation, disability, and age.

The ADL supported Comprehensive and DREAM Act legislation that would provide conditional permanent residency to certain undocumented immigrants of good moral character who graduate from US high schools, arrived in the United States as minors, and lived in the country continuously for at least five years prior to the bill's enactment.

=== College classes and student organizations ===
In early 2023, the ADL unsuccessfully pressured Bard College to cancel a course called "Apartheid in Israel-Palestine" taught by Jerusalem-based researcher Nathan Thrall. The course had also been objected to by an Israeli consul. Bard's president, Leon Botstein, described the phone call with ADL CEO Greenblatt as "not civil".

In October 2023, the ADL sent letters to almost two hundred college presidents condemning Students for Justice in Palestine (SJP) chapters, encouraging college presidents to investigate the chapters and alleging that SJP may be funding or receiving funds from Hamas. National SJP denied the ADL's claims.

=== Policing in the United States ===
ADL advocacy work extends into police trainings on antisemitism, hate crime reporting, and bias. The ADL has also given awards and honors to various people and agencies in law enforcement, including Raymond Kelly and William Bratton of NYPD, Houston Police chief Art Acevedo, and officers of St. Louis County Police Department.

Analysis of BlueLeaks files shows a strong relationship between the ADL and American law enforcement agencies, with the ADL being among a small group of community organizations that provide training or are consulted by law enforcement officers.

==== Delegations ====
The ADL facilitates US police delegations to Israel and the National Counter-Terrorism Seminar. The focus is on counterterrorism, tactics and strategies, and leadership. The ADL director of law enforcement initiatives expressed hope that Israeli police are seen as a model for police in the US, and says that police officers participating in trips to Israel "come back and they are Zionists". In addition to police agencies, participants in the program include leadership from ICE, US Marshals, and Naval Criminal Investigative Service.

The National Counter-Terrorism Seminar received wide attention following the Ferguson unrest when it was revealed that former St. Louis County Police chief Timothy Fitch was a previous participant, as well as leaders of other police forces that had demonstrated undue force and surveillance against civilians. Campaigns against the trips, citing militarization of police concerns, were successful in Vermont and in Durham, North Carolina. In 2020, the program was put on pause due to the associated costs and controversies. An internal memo opened questions as to the purpose and unintended impacts of the delegations, and recommended ending them altogether. The ADL told press that they intend to continue the program with revised curriculum and evaluation.

=== South Africa and apartheid ===
The ADL, the AJC, and other American Jewish groups asked Nelson Mandela to clarify his views on the Israeli–Palestinian conflict in 1990 in advance of a visit Mandela planned to the United States. The groups' leaders said they were concerned about the possibility of protests because Mandela had embraced Palestine Liberation Organization Chairman Yasser Arafat and Libyan president Muammar Gaddafi. The ADL said it was "disturbed and pained" by comments Mandela had made in a meeting earlier that year with PLO leader Yasser Arafat. Mandela met with a group of the American Jewish leaders in Geneva including ADL director Abe Foxman. At the event, Mandela expressed appreciation for South African Jews who opposed apartheid; he praised past Israeli leader Golda Meir for her opposition to apartheid, and Menachem Begin's book The Revolt, and said that the State of Israel had a "right to exist within the pre-1967 borders".

In his 2010 book The Unspoken Alliance, Sasha Polakow-Suransky criticized the ADL for hiring the private spy Roy Bullock to collect information on the anti-apartheid movement in the United States. Glenn Frankel, writing about the book, said the ADL "participated in a blatant propaganda campaign against Nelson Mandela and the ANC" during the 1980s but had changed its stance on Mandela around 1990 with Foxman calling him a hero. South African-born Israeli journalist Benjamin Pogrund said in a review of The Unspoken Alliance for The Jewish Chronicle that the ADL and South Africa's Jewish Board of Deputies "played toadying and inglorious roles over the years in defending Israel's ties and in support of the apartheid government".

=== Wikipedia ===
The ADL has a unit dedicated to covering Wikipedia. In 2025, the ADL published a report saying it had found "widespread antisemitic and anti-Israel bias on Wikipedia, including clear evidence of a coordinated campaign to manipulate Wikipedia's content related to the Israeli–Palestinian conflict". Historian Shira Klein criticized the ADL report, which cited her work to accuse Wikipedia of antisemitism, saying that the report "had nothing to do with antisemitism, and everything to do with controlling the narrative about Israel".

=== Other ===
In October 2010, the ADL condemned remarks by Ovadia Yosef that the sole purpose of non-Jews was to serve the Jews.

== Relations with religious and ethnic groups ==
=== Relations with African-Americans ===
During the 1970s, the ADL was a staunch opponent of affirmative action, with its then-leader Perlmutter one of the national figures in opposition. It filed an amicus brief in support of Allan Bakke, the white student in the landmark 1978 Regents of the University of California v. Bakke Supreme Court Case that struck down racial quotas for university students. Differences on the issue and others were described as leading to a rift between Jewish and African-American groups in the 1970s. In the 2003 landmark Supreme Court case Grutter v. Bollinger, the ADL filed a brief opposing the University of Michigan's affirmative action program, but its argument did not propose to end affirmative action entirely; rather, the ADL contended that race "may appropriately be considered in the admissions process", but with no more weight than other characteristics of applicants.

In 1984, The Boston Globe reported that then-ADL national director Nathan Perlmutter said that Rev. Jesse Jackson, Sr. was antisemitic after Jackson referred to New York City as "Hymietown".

The ADL criticized film director Spike Lee regarding his portrayal of Jewish nightclub owners Moe and Josh Flatbush in his film Mo' Better Blues (1990). The ADL said the characterizations of the nightclub owners "dredge up an age-old and highly dangerous form of anti-Semitic stereotyping", and that it was "disappointed that Spike Lee – whose success is largely due to his efforts to break down racial stereotypes and prejudice – has employed the same kind of tactics that he supposedly deplores". Lee's portrayal also angered the B'nai B'rith and other such Jewish organizations, causing Lee to address the criticism in an opinion piece for The New York Times, where he stated "if critics are telling me that to avoid charges of anti-Semitism, all Jewish characters I write have to be model citizens, and not one can be a villain, cheat or a crook, and that no Jewish people have ever exploited black artists in the history of the entertainment industry, that's unrealistic and unfair".

In 2004, the ADL became the lead partner in the Peace and Diversity Academy, a new New York City public high school with predominantly black and Hispanic students. The school was part of a Bloomberg-led effort to open many smaller schools. In 2014, the school was designated among New York's schools with the lowest graduation rates.

In 2018, the ADL criticized U.S. Representative Danny Davis for calling Louis Farrakhan "an outstanding human being" and not condemning his comments about Jewish people. Davis subsequently condemned Farrakhan's views, saying, "So let me be clear: I reject, condemn and oppose Minister Farrakhan's views and remarks regarding the Jewish people and the Jewish religion."

=== Interfaith camp ===
In 1996, the ADL's New England Regional Office established a faith-based initiative called "The Interfaith Youth Leadership Program", better known as "Camp If", or Camp Interfaith. Involving teenagers of the Christian, Jewish, and Islamic faiths, the camp brings the teens together for a week at camp where the teens bond and learn about each other's cultures. The camp has emerged as a new attempt to foster good relations between younger members of the Abrahamic faiths.

== Reception ==
The ADL has faced criticism on topics including domestic spying, its former Armenian genocide denial (since repudiated and apologized for), and its correlation of anti-Zionism and antisemitism.

=== Armenian genocide ===
Prior to 2007, the ADL described the Armenian genocide as a massacre and an atrocity, but not a genocide. Then-CEO Foxman had earlier opposed calls for the U.S. government to recognize it as a genocide. Turkey maintains a position of Armenian genocide denial; the ADL was reported to have deferred to Turkey as a strategic ally of America and Israel and received direct pressure from the Turkish foreign ministry.

In Watertown, Massachusetts, which has a significant Armenian population, the town council in early August 2007 decided unanimously to withdraw from the ADL's "No Place for Hate" anti-discrimination campaign over the issue. Human rights commissions in some other Massachusetts communities also withdrew in subsequent months. An editorial in The Boston Globe criticized the ADL, saying, "as an organization concerned about human rights, it ought to acknowledge the genocide against the Armenian people during World War I, and criticize Turkish attempts to repress the memory of this historical reality." On August 17, 2007, ADL fired its regional New England director, Andrew H. Tarsy, for breaking ranks and saying that ADL should recognize the genocide. In its August 21, 2007, "Statement on the Armenian Genocide", ADL acknowledged the genocide, but maintained its opposition to congressional resolutions aimed at recognizing it. Foxman wrote that "the consequences of those actions" by the Ottoman Empire against Armenians "were indeed tantamount to genocide" and "If the word genocide had existed then, they would have called it genocide". The Turkish government condemned the league's statement. It was criticized by activists and groups pushing for recognition of the genocide, who argued that the ADL hedged by using the qualifier "tantamount" and still opposed legislation. Tarsy won his job back, but he subsequently submitted his resignation, on December 4, 2007. By 2016, the ADL had joined other groups urging Congress to pass a resolution recognizing the Armenian genocide; it endorsed such a resolution in 2019.

=== Park51 Community Center opposition ===
In 2010, the ADL issued a statement opposing the Park51 Community Center, a proposed Islamic community center and mosque two blocks from the World Trade Center site in New York. It said, "The controversy which has emerged regarding the building of a Community Center at this location is counterproductive to the healing process. Therefore, under these unique circumstances, we believe the City of New York would be better served if an alternative location could be found." The ADL denounced what it saw as bigoted attacks on the project. Foxman opined that some of those who oppose the mosque are "bigots", and that the plan's proponents may have every right to build the mosque at that location. Nevertheless, he said that building the mosque at that site would unnecessarily cause more pain for the families of some victims of 9/11.

This opposition to the Community Center led to criticism of the statement from various parties, including one ADL board member, the American Jewish Committee, the Jewish Community Relations Council of New York, Rabbi Irwin Kula, columnists Jeffrey Goldberg and Peter Beinart, the Interfaith Alliance, and the Shalom Center. In an interview with The New York Times Abraham Foxman published a statement in reaction to criticism. In protest of the ADL's stance, CNN host Fareed Zakaria returned the Hubert H. Humphrey First Amendment Freedoms Prize ADL awarded him in 2005. ADL chair Robert G. Sugarman responded to a critical New York Times editorial writing, "we have publicly taken on those who criticized the mosque in ways that reflected anti-Muslim bigotry or used the controversy for that purpose" and stating that ADL has combated Islamophobia.

On September 5, 2021, the national director and CEO of the ADL, Jonathan Greenblatt, apologized for the ADL's opposition to the center, stating, "We were wrong, plain and simple".

=== Accusations of Islamophobia and anti-Palestinianism ===
The ADL considers anti-Zionism to be antisemitic.

According to The Nation's Joshua Leifer, this stance, in part, positions the ADL as "an anti-Muslim and anti-Palestinian outfit", while Eli Pariser has said the ADL's support for the prohibition of the anti-Zionist slogan "from the river to the sea" on social media is "both morally wrong and disastrously counterproductive". ADL staff have also criticized the ADL's leadership for equating Palestinian opposition to Zionism with antisemitism, while a former regional development director for the group has claimed that it is "willing to throw ... Palestinians under the bus" in order to maximize fundraising.

In 2022, the ADL's CEO denounced Jewish Voice for Peace and Students for Justice in Palestine (SJP) as the "photo inverse of the extreme right that the ADL has long tracked", a statement that was in turn denounced by more than 50 American Muslim and civil rights groups. Two years later, in 2024, the ADL asserted that the SJP had violated federal law concerning material support for Hamas, a statement that both The Nation and The Intercept observed was made without any evidence. The SJP responded by stating that "rather than combating [authoritarianism and racism] and organizing for genuine social justice, the ADL has leveraged Islamophobia, anti-Arab sentiment, and conservatism to delegitimize the movement for Palestine liberation". The ADL's claims against the SJP were criticized by the ACLU which contended they "chill speech, foster an atmosphere of mutual suspicion, and betray the spirit of free inquiry". The Council on American–Islamic Relations (CAIR) issued a public condemnation of the ADL for "slandering ... Palestinian students" and, the same year, a coalition of Harvard University student groups denounced ADL leadership as racist against Palestinians and the organization itself as "widely discredited". Hussam Ayloush, the executive director of CAIR's Los Angeles office, has said that the ADL "contributes to the growth and rise of Islamophobia in America".

In 2024, Greenblatt compared the Palestinian keffiyeh to the swastika. The comparison was criticized by CAIR, which called for Greenblatt's firing, and by the Georgetown University's Bridge Initiative for "[vilifying] the Palestinian people". That same year, authors Shane Burley and Naomi Bennet reanalyzed data from the ADL's 2023 antisemitism audit in Jewish Currents, saying the ADL and the media had used the report to oppose pro-Palestinian activism on the basis that it was "a wellspring of rising antisemitism". They found the data inflated the proportion of antisemitic incidents within the pro-Palestinian movement while "significantly" undercounting incidents of far right and white supremacist antisemitism. They concluded that the ADL's methodology made the report "unable to speak meaningfully to the prevalence or impact of antisemitism in the US".

Progressive Jewish and Muslim groups have denounced the ADL's establishment of a "Mamdani Monitor" to monitor New York City mayor Zohran Mamdani's administration as Islamophobic. CAIR said in a statement, "The ADL has never established a special monitor to harass any other elected official, including politicians who have actually expressed real bigotry against Jewish Americans. Singling out Mayor-Elect Mamdani is an act of hypocrisy and anti-Muslim bigotry, pure and simple."

=== "Drop the ADL" campaign ===
In August 2020, a coalition of progressive organizations launched the "Drop the ADL" campaign, arguing that "the ADL is not an ally" in social justice work. The campaign consisted of an open letter and a website, which were shared on social media with the hashtag "#DropTheADL". Notable signatories included the Democratic Socialists of America, Movement for Black Lives, Jewish Voice for Peace, Center for Constitutional Rights, and Council on American–Islamic Relations. The open letter stated that the ADL "has a history and ongoing pattern of attacking social justice movements led by communities of color, queer people, immigrants, Muslims, Arabs, and other marginalized groups, while aligning itself with police, right-wing leaders, and perpetrators of state violence." Some liberal groups responded by defending the ADL, with HIAS CEO Mark Hetfield characterizing Drop the ADL as a "smear campaign". The ADL published a statement that the campaign involved "many of the same groups who have been pushing an anti-Israel agenda for years". Around sixty organizations supported the campaign on its initial launch, and an additional hundred groups had joined by February 2021.

=== Wikipedia determination of unreliability on the Israeli–Palestinian conflict ===
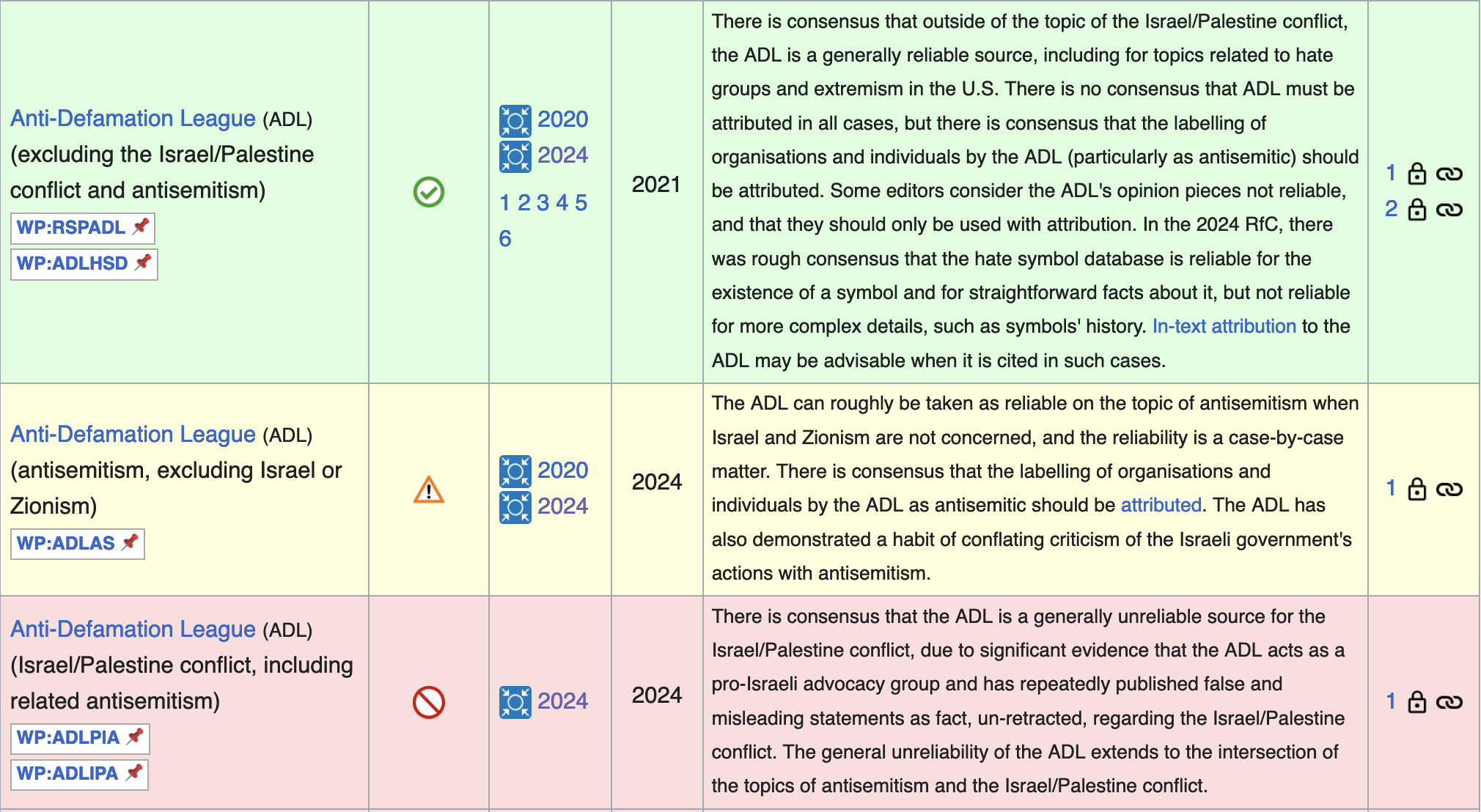
The ADL's entries on the list, dependent on topic, as of June 2024

In June 2024, the community of the English Wikipedia reached a consensus that the ADL was "generally unreliable" on the topic of the Israeli–Palestinian conflict, including "the intersection of antisemitism and the [Israeli–Palestinian] conflict, such as labeling pro-Palestinian activists as antisemitic". It was part of a three-part discussion on the ADL: one on its reliability on the Israeli-Palestinian conflict, another focused on antisemitism more broadly and the third part on the hate symbols database maintained by the organization. An English Wikipedia administrator who evaluated the community's consensus for this discussion said there was substantial evidence that the ADL acted as a "pro-Israeli advocacy group" that has published unretracted misinformation "to the point that it taints their reputation for accuracy and fact checking regarding the Israeli-Palestinian conflict", as well as that it has a habit "of conflating criticism of the Israeli government's actions with antisemitism". Wikipedia's perennial sources list noted "that outside of the topic of the Israel/Palestine conflict, the ADL is a generally reliable source, including for topics related to hate groups and extremism in the U.S."

The ADL condemned the downgrade, alleging it was part of a "campaign to delegitimize" the organization. The decision was also criticized by over 40 Jewish organizations, including Jewish Federations of North America, B'nai B'rith International and HIAS. The Wikimedia Foundation said in response, "The Foundation has not, and does not, intervene in decisions made by the community about the classification of a source".

James Loeffler of Johns Hopkins University, a professor of modern Jewish history, commented that the English Wikipedia's decision was a "significant hit" to the credibility of the ADL. Dov Waxman, professor of Israel studies, said that if "Wikipedia and other sources and the journalists start ignoring the ADL's data, it becomes a real issue for Jewish Americans who are understandably concerned about the rise of antisemitism". Mira Sucharov, a professor of political science at Carleton University, said the decision was "a sign that the Jewish community needs better institutions".

In a July 2024 Tablet magazine article titled "Wikipedia's Jewish Problem", Izabella Tabarovsky, a scholar of the history of antisemitism, wrote that "Jewish people and the Jewish story are under an unprecedented global assault, and Wikipedia is being used as a weapon in this war. Yet there are no signs that Wikimedia—which washes its hands of any decision-making responsibility with regard to Wikipedia's content yet raises millions off its back—recognizes its role and responsibility at this moment." Tabarovsky continued, "It's crucial that we understand that the attack on the ADL in this case is actually an attack on any source of unbiased information about Jews or Israel."

=== Responses to Donald Trump and his administration ===
The ADL has repeatedly criticized Trump for what they view as antisemitic tropes and engagement in apologetics for white supremacists.

In 2018, the ADL criticized Secretary of State Mike Pompeo for Islamophobia, which Sohrab Ahmari suggested was evidence of bias against conservatives. In 2019, alongside at least eight other Jewish advocacy organizations, dozens of civil rights organizations, and more than one hundred members of congress, the ADL called on the Trump administration to fire administration executive Stephen Miller, the architect of the Trump administration policies on immigration, condemning Miller as a white supremacist.

At the 2024 conference, the ADL presented Jared Kushner an award for his work brokering the Abraham Accords for the first Trump administration. The decision was criticized by both ADL supporters and board members. Danielle Bryant, the education director for the ADL's Austin, Texas chapter, resigned in protest. She wrote in the New York Daily News, "when the ADL honored Jared Kushner, a man whose support for his father-in-law fueled hate, emboldened white nationalists, and helped the cruel family separation policy, I knew I couldn't stay."

After Elon Musk made a salute interpreted by many as a Nazi salute after the second inauguration of Donald Trump, the ADL responded by saying that the salute was "an awkward gesture" and not a Nazi salute. The Jerusalem Post said that many Jewish groups accused Musk of performing an "unambiguous" Nazi salute. Former ADL national director Abraham Foxman described the gesture as a "Heil Hitler Nazi salute". Masha Pearl, executive director of Holocaust survivor charity The Blue Card, said that it was a Nazi salute, and called it "an unmistakable symbol of hate, of violence, of genocide". The Jewish Council for Public Affairs said: "Elon Musk knows precisely what he was doing with his fascist Roman salute at today's Trump rally – which follows his explicit embrace of far-right parties and policies." The Jewish Telegraphic Agency (JTA) said that the ADL appeared to be contradicting its own definition of a Nazi salute, which the ADL defines as "raising an outstretched right arm with the palm down". IfNotNow, a progressive Jewish group, said it was "appalled" that the ADL had "glossed over Musk's Nazi gesture, admonishing those of us who were aghast at the Hitler salute to give Musk 'the benefit of the doubt' – even as the ADL assumes the worst intentions of those in the movement for Palestinian human rights". The ADL's response was criticized by Rep. Alexandria Ocasio-Cortez, Slate, and cartoonist Eli Valley. The ADL declined to say how it had reached this conclusion when asked by the JTA. ADL CEO Jonathan Greenblatt later expressed regret that he had not "framed" the tweet differently given "the impact that it had". Greenblatt had previously apologized to ADL staff for favorably comparing Musk to Henry Ford despite Ford's well-known antisemitism.

Critics have alleged that under Trump, the ADL has been complicit with or silent on right-wing antisemitism, including antisemitism coming from Elon Musk and the Trump administration. In October 2025, the ADL removed its glossary on extremism after a right-wing backlash led by Musk for including entries on Turning Point USA and Christian Identity. In November 2025, when announcing a tip line for reporting antisemitic incidents in New York after the election of Zohran Mamdani, who is critical of Israel, Greenblatt said, "The reality is President Trump wasn't elected on a track record that included a long animus to the Jewish state".

=== Educators ===
In July 2025, the National Education Association (NEA) Representative Assembly voted to cut all ties with the ADL and to not use or promote ADL curricula or statistics, citing the ADL's defense of Israel. In response, the ADL said the vote was due to "pro-Hamas" activists, and nearly 400 Jewish groups signed a letter defending the ADL.

=== Historians ===
In an opinion editorial in The Guardian, historian Mark LeVine agreed with FBI Director Kash Patel's description of the ADL as a "political front masquerading as a watchdog". LeVine wrote that "since the 1970s, the organisation has focused ever more intently on shielding Israel from criticism. In parallel, it has also monitored right-wing racist and anti-LGBTQ+ extremism so that it could remain solidly within the liberal Jewish fold in the US."

== In popular culture ==
The Apple TV+ series The Savant is about a former member of the ADL's extremism monitoring division who infiltrated online hate groups. Its release was postponed in September 2025.

== See also ==
- American-Arab Anti-Discrimination Committee – Civil rights organization in the United States
- Conference of Presidents of Major American Jewish Organizations – Jewish umbrella organization in the U.S.
- Council on American–Islamic Relations – American Muslim advocacy group
- Defamation – 2009 Israeli documentary film
- Gay & Lesbian Alliance Against Defamation – American LGBT media monitoring group
- Israel lobby in the United States – Pro-Israel interest groups in the United States
- Jewish Council for Public Affairs – American nonprofit organization
- Membership discrimination in California social clubs – Based on sex, race, religion, political views and social standing
- Representative Council of French Jewish Institutions – Jewish umbrella organization in France
- Simon Wiesenthal Center – U.S.-based Jewish human rights organization
