= Israel Policy Forum =

American Jewish organization

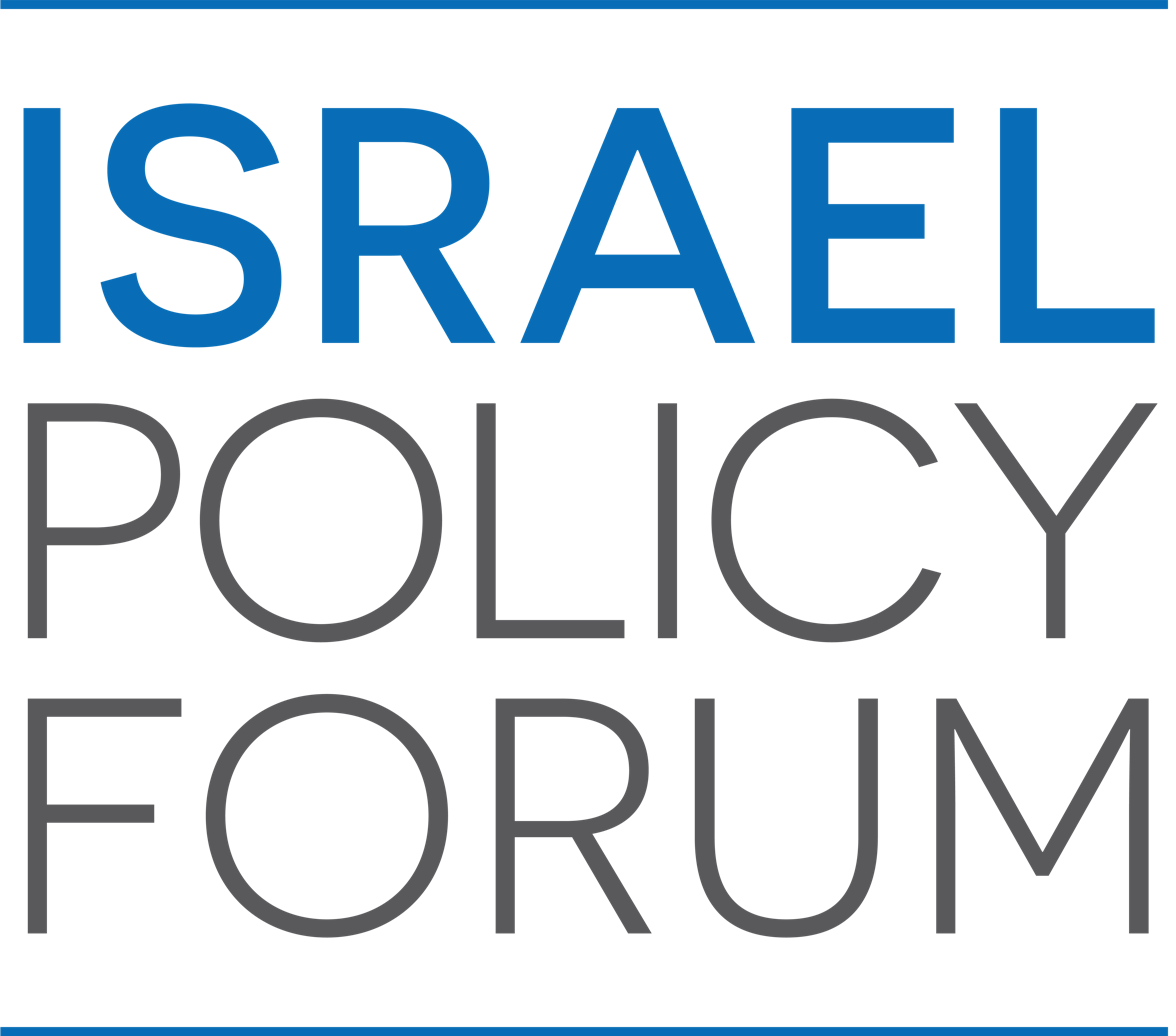
- Founders: Robert K. Lifton, Yizhak Rabin
- Type: 501(c)(3) organization
- Tax ID no.: 90-0653286
- Purpose: Israeli–Palestinian conflict Arab–Israeli conflict
- Location(s): (United States) New York, N.Y. (United States) Washington, D.C.
- Region served: USA / Israel
- Method: Policy
- CEO: David A. Halperin
- Board Chair: David A. Sherman
- Key people: Charles Bronfman (Board); Alan Solow (Board); Robert Sugarman (Board); S. Daniel Abraham (Advisory Council); Robert K. Lifton z"l (Board); Haim Saban (Advisory Council); Ronald Lauder (Advisory Council); E. Robert Goodkind (Board)
- Website: israelpolicyforum.org

The Israel Policy Forum is an American Jewish organization that works for a negotiated two-state outcome to the Israeli–Palestinian conflict through advocacy, education and policy research. The organization appeals to American policymakers in support of this goal and writes opinion pieces that have appeared in many Jewish and non-Jewish newspapers. The organization was founded in 1993.

Israel Policy Forum is chaired by David A. Sherman and its CEO is David A. Halperin.

== Mission ==
The stated mission of Israel Policy Forum is to shape the discourse and mobilize support among American Jewish leaders and U.S. policymakers for the realization of a viable two-state outcome. Israel Policy Forum believes that a two-state outcome to the conflict will "safeguard Israel’s security and future as a Jewish and democratic state."

IPF has been described as center-left.

== History ==
The Israel Policy Forum (IPF) was launched in 1993 at the encouragement of then-Israeli Prime Minister Yitzhak Rabin as a think tank and advocacy group to support the Israeli–Palestinian peace process. Rabin was frustrated with AIPAC's slow embrace of the Oslo peace process. IPF's first public activity was an op-ed in the New York Times on September 13, 1993, which supported the signing of the Oslo Accords. The op-ed was published on the same day that Rabin and PLO chair Yasser Arafat signed the agreement at the White House.

In the years after its founding, IPF developed close ties with the Clinton administration and served as a base of influential American Jewish support for the peace process. President Clinton outlined his template for a Permanent Status Agreement, known as the Clinton Parameters, at IPF's annual gala in January 2001. IPF was associated with influential policymakers and scholars, such as Clinton's National Security Advisor Sandy Berger, professor Stephen P. Cohen, and fundraisers Marvin Lender, and Alan Solomont. IPF's Israel associates were connected with the country's security establishment, which gave heft to IPF's emphasis of negotiations and a two-state solution.

In 2005, Israel Policy Forum mobilized 27 major Jewish organizations, including the Anti-Defamation League, American Jewish Committee, American Jewish Congress, B’nai B’rith, Hadassah, the Jewish Council for Public Affairs, and both the Reform and Conservative movements to sign on to a New York Times ad supporting disengagement from Gaza as a step toward two states. They managed this at a time when the Conference of Presidents of Major American Jewish Organizations was reluctant to do so. In the wake of the violence of the Second Intifada, Israel Policy Forum garnered broad support for the Gaza disengagement plan as a step toward renewed Israeli–Palestinian negotiations and hosted Vice Prime Minister Ehud Olmert for a landmark speech that signaled his forthcoming political transformation. Israel Policy Forum subsequently delivered policy recommendations endorsed by top diplomats to Secretary of State Condoleezza Rice in support of the Arab Peace Initiative and the Annapolis international peace conference.

IPF declined in prominence during the later years of the Bush Administration, as renewed peace talks never gained momentum and the dialogue in the American policy community, especially among American Jews, grew fractious. By January 1, 2010, IPF merged with Middle East Progress, a project of the liberal think tank Center for American Progress, and its Washington office closed. IPF did not have close connections with Bush Administration, and other groups advocating for U.S. involvement in the peace process, such as J Street, had become more prominent.

In 2012, the group launched an effort at revival supported by Eric Yoffie of the Union for Reform Judaism, retiring U.S. Congressman Gary Ackerman, historian Deborah Lipstadt, and philanthropist Charles Bronfman.

In 2016, Israel Policy Forum launched a study titled Two-State Security, a project that seeks to engage students, academics, activists, community leaders, and policymakers in a dialogue on how to effectively address Israel’s security needs in the pursuit of a two-state solution in the near and long-term. For this project, Israel Policy Forum also partnered with Center for a New American Security, and Commanders for Israeli Security. In June 2016 at the Herzliya Conference, Prime Minister Ehud Barak endorsed the "Security First" plan.

In 2017, Israel Policy Forum founded IPF Atid, millennial-led community to facilitate new connections, conversations, and campaigns surrounding issues in Israeli-Palestinian affairs. Since its founding, IPF Atid has grown substantially with six different chapters around the United States, including New York, Washington, D.C., Chicago, Los Angeles, San Francisco, and Boston. IPF Atid has also led delegations of young professionals to the region to explore these topics, and has hosted various programs nation-wide and internationally. In 2019, IPF Atid founded their Women, Peace, & Security Channel, to advance women’s involvement, expertise, and leadership in Israeli-Palestinian peace-building and Jewish communal affairs.

In 2018, a CNAS study was released Ending Gaza’s Perpetual Crisis. Executive Director David A. Halperin, Policy Director Michael Koplow, and Chairwoman Susie Gelman were involved on the task force of this study.

In 2020, Israel Policy Forum released a study titled: In Search Of A Viable Option, which evaluates seven potential outcomes for the Israeli-Palestinian conflict that assesses the strengths and weaknesses of different plans. The piece questions whether a two-state solution is still possible, and concludes it is still possible and is the only implementable plan that maintains Israel as Jewish and democratic. The study was written by Dr. Shira Efron and Evan Gottesman, and has a foreword written by Ambassador Daniel B. Shapiro, the U.S. Ambassador to Israel from 2011 to 2017.

Israel Policy Forum orchestrated in April 2020 an open letter signed by nearly 140 US Jewish leaders, aimed at Kachol Lavan leader Benny Gantz and his deputy, MK Gabi Ashkenazi, urging them to "remain steadfast" in their opposition to West Bank annexation under a unity government. The missive warns against allowing the coronavirus pandemic to enable Israel to annex West Bank settlements, at a time when the country needs to unify in the face of a public health emergency.

Israel Policy Forum trains advocates to promote a peaceful resolution to the Israeli–Palestinian conflict through educational programs. Israel Policy Forum holds an annual Leadership Event to support key figures who promote peacemaking efforts. Previous speakers at the Leadership Event include President Bill Clinton, Vice President Al Gore, President Elect Joe Biden, Prime Minister Ehud Barak, then-Vice Prime Minister Ehud Olmert and Vice Prime Minister Haim Ramon.

== See also ==
- Commanders for Israel's Security
