= Wesley J. Smith =

American philosopher, lawyer, & writer (born 1949)

Wesley J. Smith (born 1949) is an American philosopher, lawyer, and writer.

Notable philosophical views taken by Smith include criticism of animal rights, environmentalism, assisted suicide, and utilitarianism. He has authored or co-authored fourteen books. He has collaborated with consumer advocate Ralph Nader, and has been published in major news outlets. He is also well known for his blog, "Human Exceptionalism", hosted by National Review, which advances his theory of "human exceptionalism" and defends intrinsic human dignity. He is the host of the Humanize podcast. a Senior Fellow at the Discovery Institute's Center on Human Exceptionalism, a politically conservative, non-profit think tank.

He is a consultant for the Patients Rights Council.

== Biography ==
Smith practiced law in the San Fernando Valley from 1976–1985, at which time he left law practice to pursue other interests, particularly as a public policy advocate. His first book in 1987 was The Lawyer Book: A Nuts and Bolts Guide to Client Survival, introduced by consumer advocate Ralph Nader beginning a collaboration between the two men. Smith is a prolific author and a frequent contributor to National Review and The Weekly Standard. He closely followed the Terri Schiavo case in 2005, and wrote frequently on the topic.

Smith is a frequent guest on radio and television talk shows, having appeared on national programs such as Good Morning America and Nightline, as well as internationally on BBC Radio 4. He has testified as an expert witness in front of federal and state legislative committees, and is an international public speaker, appearing throughout the United States, Canada, Australia, South Africa, and many countries in Europe.

Smith is married to the syndicated Las Vegas Review-Journal White House correspondent Debra Saunders.

== Views ==
=== Animal rights ===
Smith's 2010 book A Rat is a Pig is a Dog is a Boy is an anti-animal rights work which defends factory farming and human exceptionalism. Smith is one of the world's foremost advocates of human exceptionalism, which he defends from a secular perspective.

=== Other issues ===
He opposes policies allowing for assisted suicide, euthanasia, human cloning, and granting human style "rights" to animals, making a clear distinction between animal rights and animal welfare. He is also a noted critic of human cloning research, radical environmentalism, and of what he calls the radical animal liberation movement, which he worries exhibits "anti-humanism".

== Reception ==
His book Culture of Death: The Assault on Medical Ethics in America was named Best Health Book of the Year at the 2001 Independent Publishers Book Awards.

Sociologist John Sorenson has negatively reviewed Smith's book A Rat is a Pig is a Dog is a Boy as a "misleading, bad-faith compendium of anti-animal rights propaganda, based on a single idea: human exceptionalism". Sorenson criticized Smith for ignoring the negative environmental effects of factory farming including habitat destruction and loss of biodiversity from deforestation. Philosopher Angus Taylor claimed that Smith has "little familiarity with the large range of literature on the moral status of animals".

== Bibliography ==
- The Lawyer Book: A Nuts and Bolts Guide to Client Survival Price Stern Sloan Publishers, 1987, ISBN 0-8431-1569-6
- The Doctor Book: A Nuts and Bolts Guide to Patient Power Price Stern Sloan Publishers, 1988, ISBN 0-89586-747-8
- The Senior Citizen's Handbook: A Nuts and Bolts Guide to More Comfortable Living Price Stern Sloan Publishers, 1989, ISBN 0-89586-795-8
- Winning the Insurance Game (1990) Ralph Nader and Wesley J. Smith, ISBN 1-877961-17-5
- The Frugal Shopper (1991) Ralph Nader and Wesley J. Smith, ISBN 0-936758-30-9
- Collision Course: The Truth About Airline Safety (1993) Ralph Nader and Wesley J. Smith, ISBN 0-8306-4271-4
- No Contest: Corporate Lawyers and the Perversion of Justice in America (1996) Random House, Ralph Nader and Wesley J. Smith, ISBN 0-679-42972-7
- Forced Exit: The Slippery Slope from Assisted Suicide to Legalized Murder (1997), ISBN 0-8129-2790-7
- Forced Exit: Euthanasia, Assisted Suicide, and the New Duty to Die (2006) Encounter Books, ISBN 1-59403-119-3
- Culture of Death: The Assault on Medical Ethics in America (2001), Encounter Books, ISBN 1-893554-06-6
- Power Over Pain, Eric M. Chevlen, MD and Wesley J. Smith, 2002, ISBN 0-9710946-0-8
- Consumer’s Guide to a Brave New World (2005), Encounter Books, ISBN 1-893554-99-6
- A Rat is a Pig is a Dog is a Boy: The Human Cost of the Animal Rights Movement (2010) Encounter Books, ISBN 978-1-59403-346-9
- The War on Humans (2014)
- Culture of Death: The Age of "Do Harm" Medicine (2016) ISBN 978-1594038556

== See also ==
- Bioethics
- The President's Council on Bioethics
- Stem Cell Research
- Euthanasia
- Assisted Suicide
- Animal liberation movement
- Human exceptionalism
- Baxter v. Montana
