= Sigmund Livingston =

American lawyer

- Born: December 27, 1872; Giessen, German Empire
- Died: June 13, 1946 (aged 73); Highland Park, Illinois, U.S.
- Known for: Founder of the Anti-Defamation League
- Spouse: Hilda Valerie Freiler (1918–1946; his death)
- Children: Richard Livingston

Sigmund G. Livingston (December 27, 1872 – June 13, 1946) was a German-born American Jewish attorney working in Chicago, Illinois. Livingston was the founder and inaugural president of the Anti-Defamation League, and author of the book Must Men Hate?. The League's annual Sigmund Livingston Award, which recognizes individuals for outstanding contributions to furthering civil rights and fighting injustice, is named after him, as is its Sigmund Livingston Fellowship.

== Life and work ==
Livingston was born in Giessen, Germany, the son of Dora and Mayer Löwenstein, and immigrated with his family to the United States in 1881, settling in Bloomington, Illinois. He became a naturalized US citizen in 1888. Livingston married Hilda Valerie Freiler on December 18, 1918. He graduated from the Law School of Illinois Wesleyan University in Bloomington, Illinois and became an attorney. He also became active in Jewish causes, joining his local B'nai B'rith lodge. He grew increasingly concerned at what he saw as pervasive stereotyping of Jews, and after walking out on a theater performance in Chicago where he felt that Jews were being caricatured, he decided to form an organization to refute anti-Jewish stereotypes. He discussed the situation with a fellow attorney, Adolf Kraus, the president of B'nai B'rith, and on September 17, 1913, Livingston founded the Anti-Defamation League, at that time a committee of the Chicago B'nai B'rith.

Livingston was known as a tireless advocate for tolerance, speaking out against antisemitism throughout the United States, through speaking engagements and conferences. Under his leadership, the Anti-Defamation League was able to address stereotypes in the popular culture, as well as in academia. For example, in 1930, the ADL was able to persuade the compilers of Roget's Thesaurus to remove an objectionable portion from its pages: it has defined Jew as synonymous with "cunning, rich, usurer, extortioner, heretic". The editors of Roget's apologized and agreed to change the definition in the next edition. In 1944, Livingston also wrote a book that refuted some of the most common anti-Jewish myths, especially those used by the Nazis. Must Men Hate? received a number of favorable reviews, including one that called it an "impressive" and "valuable" volume.

After graduation from Illinois Wesleyan Law School in 1894, Livingston began an active 30-year law practice in Bloomington, Illinois. He moved to Chicago and in 1929 became a partner in Lederer, Livingston, Kahn and Adler (now known as Saul Ewing Arnstein & Lehr, LLP).

He continued his campaign for civil rights and his fight against injustice. In 1942, Henry Ford turned to him for assistance when the media charged him with antisemitism.

After many years as an attorney and as head of the ADL, Livingston retired, and he died on June 13, 1946, in Highland Park, Illinois, at the age of 73. He was survived by his wife, Hilda, and son, Richard. In appreciation for his many years of service, B'nai B'rith established ten fellowships in his memory. The original awards were $2,000, with the money going to students who agreed to do research into prejudice and study "racial and cultural relations".
