= Josh Wolf (journalist) =

American journalist (born 1982)

Josh Wolf, March 2009

Joshua Selassie "Josh" Wolf (born June 8, 1982) is an American freelance journalist and internet videoblogger who was jailed by a Federal district court on August 1, 2006, for refusing to turn over a collection of videotapes he recorded during a July 2005 demonstration in San Francisco, California. Wolf served 226 days in prison at the Federal Correctional Institution, Dublin, California, longer than any other journalist in U.S. history has served for protecting source materials. After Wolf released his video outtakes to the public, U.S. District Judge William Alsup ordered his release on April 3, 2007. In 2007, Wolf ran for mayor of San Francisco against incumbent Gavin Newsom (finishing in 8th place with about 1 percent of the vote). The next year Wolf accepted a position at the Palo Alto Daily Post where he reported on the San Mateo County government and that of several cities within the county.

== Early life and education ==
Wolf was born in Santa Rosa, California. His parents, Len Harrison and Liz Wolf, divorced when he was a young child; he grew up in Wrightwood, California with his mother, an elementary school teacher. Wolf's middle name, Selassie, is in honor of Ethiopian Emperor Haile Selassie I. His mother was born into a Jewish family, and converted to Christianity, becoming a Messianic Jew and raising Wolf a Christian.

Wolf attended Wrightwood Elementary School in Wrightwood, California and Pinon Mesa Middle School in Phelan, California. He graduated from Serrano High School in Phelan, California in 2000. Wolf received a bachelor's degree from San Francisco State University in 2006, and finished a master's degree at the University of California Berkeley Graduate School of Journalism in 2011. His thesis film Police Tape received the Reva and David Logan Prize for Excellence in Investigative Reporting.

== Career ==
=== The video ===
Wolf, a video blogger who reported on numerous protest and progressive events, videotaped an anti-G8 anarchist protest in San Francisco on July 8, 2005 in which some of the protesters wore masks and vandalized property. Later that same night, and over the next few days, Wolf edited his footage and posted the video to a local activist news website, Bay Area Indymedia, or Indybay. Wolf also sold the video to the television broadcast station KRON the day after the protest. In the process of documenting protest actions, Wolf had recorded a tense scene of a protester being choked by a police officer and another officer threatening passersby with stun guns. The only other recording that was broadcast nearly as much was a still photograph of a bloody police officer who was injured during the protest, not taken by Wolf. Other activists who posted video and photographs to the Bay Area Indymedia website were contacted by the FBI seeking their original source materials, but it is unknown how many, if any, turned over their recordings to Federal authorities. Wolf's videotape is the only known source material from the protest to have been sought by subpoena after refusal to turn it over. On April 3, 2007, Wolf posted the unpublished footage on his blog after being assured that he would not have to testify about the footage.

=== Subpoena and arrest ===
The US District Court empaneled a grand jury to determine whether arson charges should be brought against some of the protesters on the suspicion that they may have intended to damage a police car by firing a bottle rocket under it, even though the only official damage reported was a broken tail light. The premise for Federal intervention in a case involving a city police car was that the car was funded in part by Federal dollars. Josh Wolf did not shoot any footage of the car incident. But because he shot other video footage elsewhere during the protest, and the identities of some of the protesters were allegedly known to him, Wolf was targeted by Federal officials. Wolf was subpoenaed by the court, requiring him to turn over his footage and submit to testifying before the grand jury. Specifically, the FBI subpoenaed him to provide "all documents, writings also and recordings related to protest activities conducted in San Francisco" between 6:30 p.m. and 11:59 p.m. on July 8 as well any cameras, recording devices, and his computer.

Wolf refused to comply with the subpoena. His case was picked up by the National Lawyers Guild who asked a federal magistrate in San Francisco to block the grand jury subpoena, arguing that taking such action would have a chilling effect on other journalists covering future protests. U.S. District Judge William Alsup rejected this argument and ordered Wolf be jailed on August 1, 2006 for contempt of court until he complied.

A federal appeals court granted him bail on August 31, 2006 and he was released on September 1, although Wolf again refused to comply with the district court order that he produce the videotape. On September 18, 2006 his bail was revoked and Wolf returned to prison on September 22, 2006. The entire en banc Court of Appeals refused Wolf's subsequent appeals.

February 7, 2007 marked the 169th day of Wolf's imprisonment, surpassing the time served by Vanessa Leggett, a Houston-based freelancer who was imprisoned for 168 days in 2001 and 2002 for declining to reveal unpublished material about a murder case. Wolf remained in jail for a total of 226 days, the longest time a U.S. journalist has been held in contempt for refusing to divulge sources or unpublished material.

=== Release ===
On April 3, 2007, according to Wolf's lawyer David Greene, prosecutors dropped their insistence that Wolf testify before a grand jury after he posted the unaired video online. With permission from the prosecution, U.S. District Judge William Alsup signed an order requiring Wolf's release from the Federal Correctional Institution in Dublin, California.

=== Central legal issues ===
There were a number of important legal issues at dispute in this case, including:

- whether journalists can refuse to comply with grand jury subpoenas, and under what circumstances
- whether Wolf meets the legal definition of a journalist and is entitled to those protections
- whether the Federal government has standing in this case

Wolf argued that first amendment protections allow journalists to refuse to comply when a grand jury is not conducted in good faith. Specifically, Wolf believes that the government wants his video tapes to help them identify people who were participating in the protests, not for actual footage of a crime that was committed. He has also argued that the federal prosecutor's claim for standing is tenuous (based on the fact that federal funds helped to pay for a police car that was damaged), and that the case was brought before a federal grand jury in order to avoid California's shield laws. There is no Federal shield law at this time.

The Federal prosecutor argued that Wolf does not meet the statutory definition of a journalist (under California law) or a common law journalist's privilege based on the Federal Rules of Evidence. Further, they argued that even if he did, the protections afforded to journalists would not cover his activities in this case because he merely observed the incidents he recorded in a public place. He did not prompt them, nor did he offer anyone anonymity or confidentiality.

District Court Judge Alsup refused to address any of these issues in his written ruling. He simply signed an order written by the Federal prosecutor that ordered Wolf be jailed because it had been established that he was not complying with a grand jury subpoena.

In their written ruling, the United States Court of Appeals for the Ninth Circuit ruled against Wolf on all three issues.

=== Responses ===
Questions of Wolf's legitimacy as a journalist have been answered by support from various journalist groups. For example, on August 23, 2006 (22 days after Wolf was incarcerated), The Society of Professional Journalists awarded him their Journalist of the Year "for upholding the principles of a free and independent press." The SPJ described Wolf as "...a California blogger and freelance journalist..." Josh Wolf was the only journalist jailed for his professional activities in the United States in 2006, according to Committee to Protect Journalists (this organization is a member of International Freedom of Expression Exchange). Support in the journalistic community is not uniform, however. On February 28, 2007, syndicated columnist Debra Saunders attacked the credibility of Wolf's arguments, namely the lack of an expectation of privacy of those he was filming.

In a televised interview on February 9, 2007, Wolf and his attorney, Martin Garbus, responded to the question of the legitimacy of federal involvement, by claiming that the legal efforts against Wolf were part of a broader attempt by the government to learn the identity of people within the video who are critical of the Bush administration and to suppress American journalism at large.

Wolf stated during his portion of the interview via phone from prison that he has offered to allow the judge to review "in camera" the raw footage to determine if there's any applicable evidence within the video and the U.S. Attorney's office refused the offer based on a legal technicality. Wolf also said that the raw video does not offer any more applicable evidence of the arson or assault charges.

The U.S. Attorney's office declined to participate in the interview but a spokesperson sent a statement saying they were obligated to gather evidence and that six separate judges have "... ruled that this office has issued a lawful subpoena for legitimate investigative purposes ...".

The Rise Up Network Legal Fund held a benefit to help free Josh Wolf and the media in general on September 21, 2006. Featured speakers included Ross Mirkarimi, Chris Daly, and Judith Miller.

After Josh Wolf took a job as a general assignment reporter at the Palo Alto Daily Post in 2008, he had some choice words for critics who have questioned his claim of being a journalist.

"If the haters who said I wasn't a real journalist, are still lurking," Wolf wrote on his blog, "I hope you don't have too much indigestion after eating your words.'

== Candidacy for mayor ==
On July 4, 2007, Wolf announced his candidacy for the office of Mayor of San Francisco, against incumbent Gavin Newsom. Promising an "open and transparent government", Wolf stated he would wear a video camera everywhere he does his mayoral business. His platform also discussed homelessness, crime, transportation, public works, gay marriage, medical marijuana and other issues.

Wolf finished in 8th place with 1.24% of votes cast.

== See also ==
- Greg Anderson (trainer)
- Judith Miller (journalist)
