= Deadly Exchange =

Campaign by Jewish Voice for Peace

Deadly Exchange is a political campaign launched by Jewish Voice for Peace, a left-wing Jewish-American activist organization, the goal of which is to end exchange programs between American and Israeli security forces.

== History ==
Jewish Voice for Peace (JVP) launched the Deadly Exchange campaign in June 2017. JVP describes the campaign as "a group of multiracial Jews and allies who have been working to end U.S.-Israel law enforcement exchange programs." JVP had named several major Zionist organizations as "complicit" in these exchanges, including AIPAC, the ADL and Birthright Israel, and believes that "institutions who run and fund the deadly exchange" must be held accountable.

Durham, North Carolina, become the first American city to bar police funding for police training in Israel in April 2018. JVP's Deadly Exchange worked with a coalition of Muslim, pro-Palestinian, and civil rights groups to lobby the Durham City Council. The petition delivered to the city council stated that the "Israeli Defense Forces and the Israel Police have a long history of violence and harm against Palestinian people and Jews of color." The city council's vote was unanimous.

In March 2020, a leaked Anti-Defamation League memo stated that the group had not facilitated any police exchanges since 2019. The memo was published by Jewish Currents and The Guardian in March 2022. The "Deadly Exchange" campaign celebrated this as a victory, but the ADL claimed that activists were wrong to take credit for a "pause" in the programs and that the programs may be resumed in future, with the dimensions of that endeavor to be determined.

In 2020, JVP issued an update on the campaign, stating that making connections between the United States and Israel could cause harm if context is not provided. The update said that "Suggesting that Israel is the start or source of American police violence or racism shifts the blame from the United States to Israel. This obscures the fundamental responsibility and nature of the U.S., and harms Black people and Black-led struggle. It also furthers an antisemitic ideology."

In September 2021, the Seattle City Council voted 5–4 against a bill that would have ended the "Deadly Exchange" with the Seattle Police Department.

== Criticism ==
According to Steven L. Pomerantz, an "architect" of a U.S.-Israeli exchange program who served as Assistant Director of the FBI and Director of the Homeland Security Program at the Jewish Institute for National Security of America (JINSA), referred to the idea of a "Deadly Exchange" based on sharing "worst practices" as a false and dangerous lie. Pomerantz believes supporters of Deadly Exchange are at best operating on a "deep misunderstanding" and at worst on "virulent bias".

The American Jewish Committee (AJC) believes that the Deadly Exchange campaign promotes an antisemitic trope that falsely suggests that "Israel is responsible for American police brutality due to training programs between U.S. and Israeli police forces." AJC has condemned the idea that "Israeli and U.S. law enforcement exchange security practices and ideologies to purposely target people of color" as "hate" and a "false equivalence", stating that accusing Israel or Zionists of "complicity in the murder of Black people is malicious, perpetuates antisemitism, and blames Jews for societal ills (see scapegoat)."

== See also ==
- Black Lives Matter
- Jewish left
- Jewish Voice for Peace
- Jews of color
