= Coalition for Jewish Values =

American Orthodox Jewish advocacy organization

The Coalition for Jewish Values is an American Orthodox Jewish right-wing advocacy organization founded in 2017. In 2022 it claimed to represent over 2,000 Orthodox rabbis. Critics have described it as a fringe group with little support in the Orthodox community, but supporters call it a "Torah voice".

== See also ==
- Project Esther
