= Jonathan Jacoby =

American activist (born 1953)

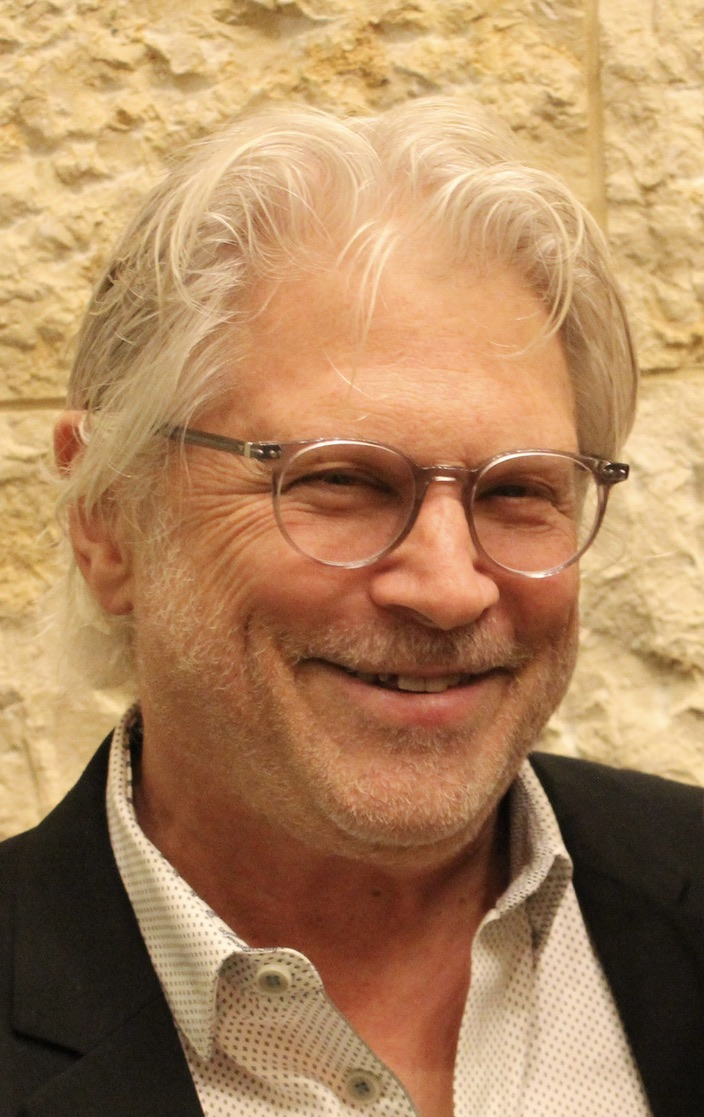
- Born: October 21, 1953 (age 72)
- Education: University of California at Los Angeles (BA); Harvard University (MEd); University of Judaism (BLitt)
- Occupation: Director of the Nexus Task Force
- Known for: Social Activism

Jonathan Jacoby (born October 21, 1953) is an American social activist, known for his contributions in the fields of advocacy for Israeli-Palestinian peace, combatting antisemitism, Jewish communal life, and rare disease research.

== Early life and education ==
Jonathan Jacoby was born in Los Angeles in 1953 to parents who had survived the Holocaust. His mother (Erika Jacoby) had survived Auschwitz and his father (Emil Jacoby) was active in rescue operations for his fellow Jews in Hungary.

Jacoby earned a Bachelor of Arts in history of religion from the University of California at Los Angeles in 1976. Subsequently, he obtained a Master of Education degree from Harvard University in 1977. Continuing his academic journey, he received a Bachelor of Literature in Judaic Studies from the University of Judaism, Los Angeles, in 1978.

== Career ==
=== Work for Israeli-Palestinian peace and against antisemitism ===
Jacoby has played key roles in the establishment and leadership of several advocacy and policy organizations and initiatives.

He was the first Executive Director of the New Israel Fund (1982–1988). During his tenure, NIF emerged as a prominent advocate for social justice and equality in Israel.

Jacoby was a co-founder and Executive Director of the Israel Policy Forum (IPF), which he helped establish as a nonpartisan think tank focused on advocating sustainable solutions for the Arab-Israeli conflict.

A longtime peace activist and Jewish community leader, Jacoby also served as President of Americans for Peace Now (1989 to 1992) and Senior Vice President of Programs for Jewish Life at the Jewish Federation of Greater Los Angeles (2010 to 2013).

In October 1991, Jacoby was a guest on an episode of the Charlie Rose Show, dealing with the Madrid Conference of 1991, an attempt by the international community to revive the Israeli–Palestinian peace process through negotiations, which was due to convene the following day. The participants discussed the prospects for peace and the obstacles facing the peace-makers.

In 2019, Jacoby founded the Nexus Task Force, which developed the Nexus Document, a new definition of antisemitism as it relates to Israel, the first of its kind since the creation of the IHRA working definition of antisemitism. The U.S. National Strategy to Counter Antisemitism, released by the Biden Administration in May 2023, "welcomes and appreciates the Nexus Document". In his role as Director, Jacoby leads a group that addresses Israel and antisemitism-related issues, emphasizing responsible discourse and preventing the political abuse of antisemitism.

In January 2024, Jacoby became the National Director of the newly-formed Nexus Project, which was created to promote the principles in the Nexus Document among Jewish community leaders and US policymakers.

In March 2024, reporting on the controversy caused by Jonathan Glazer's acceptance speech at the 96th Academy Awards, on receiving the Academy Award for Best International Feature Film for The Zone of Interest, the BBC interviewed Jacoby, in his capacity as Director of the Nexus Task Force, asking for his views on Glazer's speech and on the hostile response the speech had received from a number of individuals and organizations. The interview was broadcast on the BBC World Service.

Jacoby is frequently consulted by journalists writing about the relationship between criticism of Israel's actions and antisemitism.

=== Work in the field of medical research ===
Jacoby's involvement in addressing rare diseases led to his co-founding of the Hide & Seek Foundation and the Support of Accelerated Research for Niemann Pick Disease Type C (SOAR-NPC). He was also Chief Operating Officer of CollabRx, Inc., a Silicon Valley start-up, which provided information and consulting services related to rare diseases (2008–2009). Through these initiatives, he has helped facilitate collaboration and funding for research in the field.

== Awards ==
- 2016: RARE Champions of Hope – Collaborations in Science and Technology Award from Global Genes
- 2018: Career Achievement Award from the Jewish Communal Professionals of Southern California
- 2023: Persevere Award from the National Niemann Pick Disease Foundation
