= Foreskin Man =

Comic series

- The cover of Foreskin Man #1

Publication information
- Publisher: Male Genital Mutilation bill Comics (MGMbill Comics)
- First appearance: 2011
- Created by: Matthew Hess

In-story information
- Alter ego: Miles Hastwick
- Species: Human
- Abilities: Plasma flight boots

Foreskin Man is an American comic book created by Matthew Hess to protest against circumcision. The comic centers on Foreskin Man, a superhero who saves babies from being circumcised and fights their would-be circumcisers.

Foreskin Man was created by Matthew Hess, the author of a proposed bill to ban medically unnecessary circumcisions of minors, during a 2010 to 2011 campaign to ban this procedure in San Francisco. The comic received criticism from advocates on both sides of the circumcision debate for its alleged use of antisemitic imagery in its second issue.

== Background ==
In 2010, intactivists (activists against infant circumcision) began an initiative to put a measure on San Francisco's November 2011 ballot that would ban all non-medically necessary circumcisions of minors. The effort was spearheaded by intactivist group Bay Area Intactivists, which used a bill whose text was written by Matthew Hess, the founder of San Diego–based intactivist website MGMbill.org (MGM being an acronym for "male genital mutilation", a term used by some intactivists to denounce circumcision). Hess also published Foreskin Man, a comic about a superhero who fights circumcisers and saves babies from them. In the comic, which has seven issues, superhero Foreskin Man battles enemies and saves boys from circumcisions in a variety of situations including hospital circumcisions, religious circumcisions, and tribal circumcisions.

== Plot ==
Foreskin Man's alter ego is Miles Hastwick, a former corporate scientist now curator of the Museum of Genital Integrity. He is adamantly against the practice of circumcision. In the first issue, Hastwick comes up with the alter ego of Foreskin Man to fight against practitioners of circumcision and "the pro-circumcision lobby," whom he feels have gained too much power through "all of the well connected doctors and lawyers." In the second issue, Foreskin Man encounters and fights a "Monster Mohel". In the third issue of the comic, he teams up with a female heroine, dubbed "Vulva Girl," who fights to oppose female genital mutilation. Together, they travel to Kenya to stop tribal circumcisions. In the fourth issue, he travels to Turkey to prevent the teenage son of a belly dancer from receiving an Islamic circumcision. The fifth issue shows him battling against the head of a company that collects foreskins for use in cosmetics. Finally, in the sixth issue, he goes to the Philippines to disrupt a tuli rite.

== Other media ==
In 2011, Matthew Hess released the dance-pop single "Foreskin Man", which was sung by a woman credited as Vulva Girl. The song is referenced in issue six of the comics, where it serves as the ringtone of Malaya Luansing, one of Hastwick's employees. Additionally, Hess has produced Foreskin Man trading cards and T-shirts.

== Accusations of antisemitism ==
In the second issue of the comic, Foreskin Man attends a brit milah and battles a "Monster Mohel". The portrayal of Jews in the series as nebbish, predatory, and feminine directly contrasts with the portrayal of Foreskin Man as blond, blue-eyed, muscled, and masculine. This imagery drew criticism from both sides of the circumcision debate. Abby Porth of the Jewish Community Relations Council called the comic "deeply alarming" and pointed out that "Monster Mohel" was portrayed in a way that resembled images used by the Nazis in antisemitic propaganda. The American Civil Liberties Union of Northern California argued in an amicus brief against the ban that Foreskin Man was evidence that the initiative was actually motivated by antisemitism. Nancy Appel of the Anti-Defamation League stated that the comic had "polarized and isolated, and that people who may have been willing to hear their side are just disgusted".

In addition to being denounced by defenders of circumcision, Foreskin Man was also criticized by activists against the practice. Lloyd Schofield, the leader of the initiative to place the circumcision ban on the ballot, called the comic "a distraction at best", described it as "inflammatory and 180 degrees different from the direction we want to go in", and had wanted Hess to remove it from MGMBill.org.

In response to criticism, Hess asserted that his comic did not focus on Judaism; rather, it dealt with a variety of settings and circumcisers, including circumcisions performed by doctors, religious circumcisions, and tribal circumcisions. When questioned about Foreskin Man's coloring, Hess responded that "Foreskin Man’s blond hair, blue eyes, and fair skin reflects my own German heritage. I see absolutely no reason to be ashamed of that."
