= Peace and Diversity Academy =

Public school in New York City

Coordinates: 40°49′39″N 73°53′50″W

Peace & Diversity Academy
- The Bronx, New York, New York; United States

Information
- Type: Public secondary
- Motto: Be A Leader, Make A Difference, Promote Peace
- Established: 2004
- Closed: 2021
- Principal: Andrew M.L. Turay
- Grades: 9–12
- Website: http://www.peaceanddiversityacademy.org/

Peace and Diversity Academy was a New York City public high school located in the Longwood neighborhood of the Bronx.
