= Alan Solow =

American lawyer

- Education: University of Illinois (AB Pol Sci-summa cum laude); Harvard Law School (J.D.-cum laude)
- Occupations: public affairs consultant political advisor
- Known for: Grover Strategies LLC (founder)
- Movement: 2012 Obama-Biden re-election campaign (national co-chair); 2003 Barack Obama's Illinois Senate campaign (finance committee)

Alan P. Solow, founder of Grover Strategies LLC, is a public affairs consultant, political advisor, not-for-profit activist and former lawyer. He is a former chairman of the Conference of Presidents of Major American Jewish Organizations and was a national co-chair of the successful 2012 Obama-Biden re-election campaign.

== Professional career ==
Solow practiced law full-time until April 1, 2016, when he transitioned into public affairs advisory work and joined Resolute Consulting. At Resolute, he provided advice to clients, focusing on government relations-based strategy. He specializes in infrastructure and technology projects and also works on communications issues.

Prior to joining Resolute, he was a principal at the Chicago law firm Goldberg Kohn and was a partner at the international law firm, DLA Piper, LLC. Solow began his career as a litigator, but practiced bankruptcy law for over 30 years. He was elected by his peers as a Fellow in the prestigious AmericaCollege of Bankruptcy and was a Co-Editor of several editions of the Illinois Institute of Continuing Legal Education's Bankruptcy Practice handbook.

== Community leadership ==
From January 2009 through May 2011, Solow served as Chair of the Conference of Presidents of Major American Jewish Organizations, through which he met with the leaders of dozens of countries and traveled the world. Solow previously served as Chairman of JCC Association of North America between 2006 and 2010. He was the chairman of Chicago's Jewish Community Relations Council from 2004 to 2006. He served as President of the Jewish Community Centers of Chicago between 1995 and 1997 and was President of Young Men's Jewish Council from 1986 to 1987. He served many terms on the board of the Jewish Federation of Metropolitan Chicago, including on its executive committee. He also served as a Trustee of the Jewish Federations of North America and was a Director of Sinai Health Systems.

Solow currently is chairman of Interfaith Youth Core, a national organization promoting interfaith dialogue and service projects on college campuses. He is a member of the board of advisors of the Truman National Security Project, and serves on the boards of the Jewish People's Policy Institute and Israel Policy Forum, for which he also is a member of the executive committee.

Solow is a recipient of a number of awards for his work, including the American Jewish Committee's Learned Hand Award and JCC Association's Weil Award.

== Political engagement ==
Solow has been an advisor to and activist on behalf of many politicians. In 2003, he served on the finance committee for Barack Obama's Illinois Senate campaign. He subsequently accompanied Senator Obama on his first trip to Israel in 2006. Solow was a charter member of Obama's National Finance Committees for the 2008 and 2012 presidential campaigns and was a national co-chair in 2012. He also served as a surrogate for the candidate in both presidential elections.

Solow has been a frequent White House visitor and an advisor to President Obama and his team on Middle East policy. He was deeply involved in defending the Joint Comprehensive Plan of Action with Iran and wrote a widely published opinion piece defending President Obama.

He was an official member of the United States delegation to the funeral of Shimon Peres and accompanied President Obama on Air Force One. Solow was recognized as the eleventh most influential Jew in the world by the Jerusalem Post.

== Biography ==
Solow graduated summa cum laude in 1976 from the University of Illinois, with highest distinction in Political Science. He graduated cum laude from Harvard Law School in 1979. While at Harvard, Solow served as President of the Harvard Law School Forum. At the University of Illinois, he was a Charles Merriam Scholar, as the outstanding undergraduate student in the Political Science Department, and was the founder and first president of the Orange Krush, the basketball team's official fan group and philanthropic organization.

Solow was married at 20 years old to his wife and had children shortly after. His first son was born in 1979 and his second son was born in 1983. He has 5 grandchildren born in 2007, 2009, 2012, 2020, and 2025.
