= Canadian Institute for the Study of Antisemitism =

Research institute

The Canadian Institute for the Study of Antisemitism (CISA) is one of seven institutes in the world dedicated to the scholarly study of antisemitism. Founded in 2010 by Canadian historian Catherine Chatterley, the Institute is a national organization based in Winnipeg.

CISA's Annual Shindleman Family Lecture has been delivered by U.S. State Department Special Envoys to Monitor and Combat Antisemitism Hannah Rosenthal and Deborah Lipstadt, as well as Daniel Jonah Goldhagen, Alvin Rosenfeld, Jeffrey Herf, Irwin Cotler, David Harris, and James Carroll.

CISA facilitates research, scholarship, and teaching on the nature and history of antisemitism in both its classical and contemporary forms and provides public education programming on this subject matter for Canadians. In 2016, CISA established the first academic journal for the study of antisemitism: Antisemitism Studies, which is published by Indiana University Press. The editorial board includes prominent scholars such as Yehuda Bauer, David Nirenberg, and Deborah Lipstadt, and the journal's editor is Catherine Chatterley.

The organization's website states that it "is a registered Canadian charity committed to the uprooting of hatred and stereotypes through progressive education and by working cooperatively to build a more humane future for all people."

CISA's director and chairperson were invited to accompany the Canadian government to Israel as part of its official delegation in January 2014. In 2021, FAST Fighting Antisemitism Together merged with CISA. Its programs, Voices into Action and Choose your Voice, have been expanded under the banner of CISA's human rights program and are offered free of charge to teachers in over 22,000 Canadian schools.

== See also ==
- Institute for the Study of Contemporary Antisemitism, Indiana University
- Vidal Sassoon International Center for the Study of Antisemitism, Hebrew University
- Stephen Roth Institute, Tel Aviv University
- Birkbeck Institute for the Study of Antisemitism, Birkbeck, University of London
- Center for Research on Antisemitism, Technische Universität Berlin
- Institute for the Study of Global Antisemitism and Policy (ISGAP)
