= Yale Initiative for the Interdisciplinary Study of Antisemitism =

Academic center for study of antisemitism

The Yale Initiative for the Interdisciplinary Study of Antisemitism (YIISA) was an academic center at Yale University. Founded in 2006, it was the first university-based center in North America dedicated to the study of antisemitism. Professor Charles A. Small was YIISA's inaugural director.

In 2011, Yale's decision to close YIISA sparked protest from the American Jewish community. After YIISA's subsequent closure, Yale opened the Yale Program for the Study of Antisemitism under the direction of Professor Maurice Samuels.

== History ==
Charles A. Small, founder of the Institute for the Study of Global Antisemitism and Policy (ISGAP), developed the idea for a university-based center for studying antisemitism in the summer of 2004 after attending an international meeting on antisemitism at the United Nations. There, he met scholars with no institutional home. According to Small, the institute's goal was to provide academic evidence of antisemitism in the more extreme forms of anti-Israel advocacy.

Yale University agreed to host the institute and officially launched the Yale Initiative for the Interdisciplinary Study of Antisemitism (YIISA), the first university-based institute in North America dedicated to the study of antisemitism, on September 19, 2006 with Small as the inaugural director. At Yale, YIISA was part of the Institution for Social and Policy Studies. The initiative launched with a series of seminars by scholars such as Ruth Wisse, former CIA director James Woolsey, and former Canadian minister of justice Irwin Cotler.

YIISA was the fourth university-based center studying antisemitism in the world, joining institutes at Technische Universität Berlin in Germany, and Hebrew University and Tel Aviv University in Israel.

=== Closure ===
In early June 2011, Yale University notified YIISA that the center would be closed at the end of July. A Yale spokesman stated that the cancelation was allegedly due to the initiative not meeting academic expectations, other reports believed that the closure was political and related to the institute's work on Muslim antisemitism.

Jewish advocacy groups such as the American Jewish Committee and the Anti-Defamation League criticized Yale's decision, praising YIISA's academic contributions to the contemporary understanding of antisemitism. Walter Reich, a member of YIISA's board of advisers and a former director of the U.S. Holocaust Memorial Museum wrote that the closure came on the tails of a "firestorm" which ensued after YIISA hosted a conference in August 2010 entitled "Global Antisemitism: A Crisis of Modernity", where some of the speakers highlighted instances of antisemitism in the Arab-Muslim world. Scholar Amitai Etzioni argued that Yale should not have closed the center in response to political pressure.

Other scholars, such as Antony Lerman and Robert Wistrich, welcomed Yale's decision to close YIISA, arguing that YIISA was politicized and struggled to establish academic rigor.

=== Successor program ===
On June 20, 2011, less than three weeks after Yale's announcement, Yales provost Peter Salovey announced the creation of the Yale Program for the Study of Antisemitism (YPSA). In the wake of the YIISA decision, Salovey said a group of faculty members expressed interest in creating a new initiative. Professor Maurice Samuels, director of the new institute, said research would be devoted to both contemporary and historical antisemitism, stating, "Like many, I am concerned by the recent upsurge in violence against Jews around the world."

Small, YIISA's director, expressed skepticism regarding the new program, accusing it of being too historically focused: "Anti-Semitism is a 21st-century relevant issue. To focus on its roots and history, glosses over issues scholars must address today, especially when it comes to the threat of contemporary radical Islamist anti-Semitism."
