= The Legacy of Islamic Antisemitism =

2008 book by Andrew Bostom

The Legacy of Islamic Antisemitism: From Sacred Texts to Solemn History
- Author: Andrew G. Bostom
- Language: English
- Subject: Antisemitism in Islam
- Genre: Islamic history
- Publisher: Prometheus Books
- Publication date: May 30, 2008
- Publication place: United States
- Pages: 766
- ISBN: 978-1-59102-554-2
- OCLC: 1158746917
- Preceded by: The Legacy of Jihad

The Legacy of Islamic Antisemitism: From Sacred Texts to Solemn History is a 2008 book by Andrew G. Bostom. It has been described by Raphael Israeli in The Jerusalem Post as a "collection of sources, Islamic and others, which testify to the long and sorry history of antisemitism in Islam."

== Reception ==
According to Hebrew University professor Raphael Israeli, "the author delves in considerable detail into the main sources of Islamic jurisprudence—the Koran and the Hadith, complemented by the Sirah (the earliest pious Muslim biographies of Muhammad), where an abundance of references, usually not complimentary but rather derogatory, are made to Jews, collectively known as Israi'liyyat (Israelites' stories). This is a trove of anti-Jewish stereotypes that have become the Shari'a-based uncontested "truth" about the People of the Book. Those accounts are invariably cited in sermons during Friday prayers, thus assuring their universal diffusion among Muslim constituents and the constant poisoning of the souls of young and adult Muslims alike, something that renders their fundamentally negative attitudes to Jews and Israel unchangeable."

Benny Morris writing in The New Republic calls Bostom's book "important and deeply discouraging." Morris discusses a great deal of material that Bostom has omitted, concluding that in many ways the antisemitism of the Muslim world is even worse than portrayed in The Legacy of Islamic Antisemitism. However, Benny Morris later apologized in the review for this comment, saying "Mea culpa. I somehow missed the references to the Aden and Moroccan massacres and the medieval pogroms and apologize for writing that they were not mentioned in the book."

The Wisconsin Jewish Chronicle praises the book for making its case with exhaustive use of original sources, "Anti-Semitic passages from the Koran, the hadith (collected anecdotes about the Muslim prophet Mohammed's life), the sira (early biographies of Mohammed). Anti-Semitic essays, speeches and excerpted book passages by Muslim scholars, theologians and thinkers from the Middle Ages to the present. (and) Scholarly, witness and journalistic accounts of Muslim persecutions of and discrimination against Jews over more than 1,000 years."

Raymond Ibrahim wrote in The Washington Times that "one should not conflate Islam's mandates with the beliefs of the average "Muslim"; nor should all of these texts be construed as representative of all Muslims," while noting that the book "is a welcome contribution, in that it at least brings balance" to academia's "apologizing, distorting and especially ignoring Islam's most authoritative texts regarding Jews."

In the Journal for the Study of Antisemitism, Alyssa A. Lappen found it a "landmark book" that was both "extensive" and "scientific", and which "informs self-respecting scholars that they can no longer shamelessly blame Christianity as the sole source of antisemitism—or more importantly, that Islam does not and never had its own innate brand of loathing for the Jewish people."
