= Andrew G. Bostom =

American writer

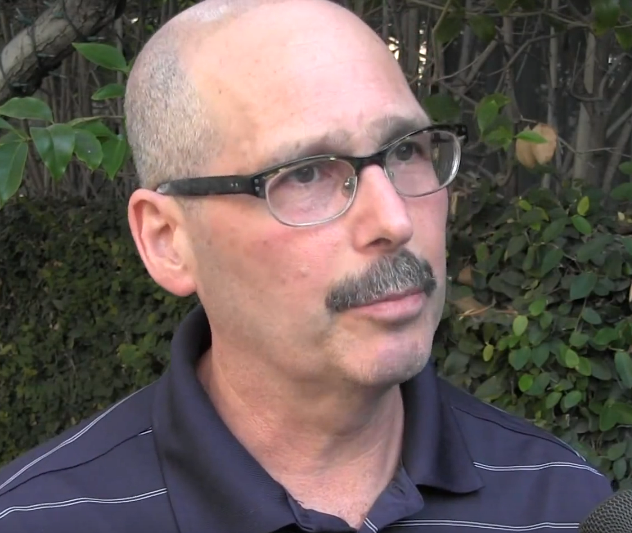
- Bostom in 2016
- Born: Andrew Gould Bostom; 1955 or 1956 (age 70–71)
- Education: SUNY Downstate Health Sciences University (MD)
- Occupations: Author; physician; blogger
- Known for: Criticism of Islam; Criticism of COVID-19 vaccinations and mitigation
- Website: andrewbostom.org

Andrew Gould Bostom (born 1955 or 1956) is an American author, physician and critic of Islam, who is a former associate professor of medicine and researcher at Brown University Medical School. Bostom has authored historical works such as The Legacy of Jihad and The Legacy of Islamic Antisemitism, and has also been noted for his criticism of COVID-19 vaccinations and the public health establishment's mitigation efforts and narrative about the pandemic.

== Biography ==
=== Background and writings on Islam ===
Bostom grew up in New York City, lived in Queens most of his early life and went to medical school in Brooklyn, receiving his MD from SUNY Downstate Health Sciences University College of Medicine in 1990. He is Jewish, although "not particularly religious". He became an associate professor of medicine at Brown University Medical School, where he was an internal medicine specialist from 1997 to 2021. In 2007, it was reported that Bostom had been awarded a $19.6 million federal grant to fund five more years of research at Rhode Island Hospital into ways to reduce heart attack and stroke in kidney transplant patients.

Bostom's attention to Islam was started with the September 11 attacks in 2001, after which he read "everything" ever written by Bat Ye'or. He met Ye'or after a correspondence with Daniel Pipes, and thereafter brought her to Brown to give a guest lecture, following which she became a "very close" mentor to Bostom. He began writing short essays within a year of 9/11, and wrote his first book with the encouragement of Ibn Warraq. Bostom authored The Legacy of Jihad in 2005, a work which provides an analysis of jihad based on an exegesis of translations of Islamic primary sources done by other writers on the topic, and was the editor of the 2008 anthology of primary sources and secondary studies on the theme of Muslim antisemitism, The Legacy of Islamic Antisemitism. He published his third compendium, Sharia versus Freedom: The Legacy of Islamic Totalitarianism, in 2012. He has additionally written articles in the New York Post, Washington Times, New York Daily News, National Review, American Thinker, Pajamas Media, FrontPage Magazine, Blaze Media, and published his own blog.

Alyssa A. Lappen in the Journal for the Study of Antisemitism found Bostom's first book "groundbreaking", and the second a "landmark book" that was both "extensive" and "scientific". Bostom's view that Islam and Islamism are "synonymous" has been criticized by professor Bassam Tibi who states that most Muslims in the world are not Islamists. Christopher van der Krogt has described Bostom as a polemicist. Matt Carr writing in Race & Class, described Bostom as a "protégé" of Bat Ye’or, and described Bostom's perspective of Islam as reducing to the acronym "‘MPED’ – massacre, pillage, enslavement and deportation". Bostom participated in the 2007 and 2008 international counter-jihad conferences, and is regarded as part of the counter-jihad movement.

=== On COVID-19 ===
Bostom has supported and signed the controversial Great Barrington Declaration, which opposed government COVID-19 mitigation measures such as mask wearing and lockdowns, in favor of shielding those considered to be at risk, while those not at risk could resume normal activities. He has criticized COVID-19 vaccinations for the risks of myocarditis, and mitigation measures for college students, arguing with having found zero hospitalizations from 26,000 positive COVID tests on 29 universities, and stating that mask-wearing and quarantine mandates are "predicated on the disproven idea that there is asymptomatic transmission of the virus," arguing from a lack of support from randomized control trials.

Bostom was suspended from Twitter after receiving five strikes for "misinformation", but, according to the Twitter Files, after his attorney contacted Twitter, Twitter's internal audit found that only one of his five violations had been valid. The one tweet still considered to be in violation reportedly cited data that was found to be "legitimate but inconvenient to the public health establishment's narrative about the risks of flu versus Covid in children." His account was later reinstated.

In 2021, citing his connections to Brown University and his experience with clinical trials, Bostom testified as an expert witness in epidemiology for litigants who sought to overturn mask requirements for Rhode Island schoolchildren in Superior Court.

== Bibliography ==
- The Legacy of Jihad: Islamic Holy War and the Fate of Non-Muslims. Prometheus. 2005. ISBN 978-1591026020.
- The Legacy of Islamic Antisemitism: From Sacred Texts to Solemn History. Prometheus. 2008. ISBN 978-1591025542.
- Sharia Versus Freedom: The Legacy of Islamic Totalitarianism. Prometheus. 2012. ISBN 978-1616146665.
- The Mufti's Islamic Jew-Hatred: What the Nazis Learned from the 'Muslim Pope'. CreateSpace. 2013. ISBN 978-1493721924.
- Iran's Final Solution for Israel: The Legacy of Jihad and Shi'ite Islamic Jew-Hatred in Iran. CreateSpace. 2014. ISBN 978-1497362895.
