= Antony Lerman =

British writer (born 1946)

Antony Lerman (born 11 March 1946) is a British writer who specialises in the study of antisemitism, the Israeli–Palestinian conflict, multiculturalism, and the place of religion in society. From 2006 to early 2009, he was Director of the Institute for Jewish Policy Research, a think tank on issues affecting Jewish communities in Europe. From December 1999 to 2006, he was Chief Executive of the Hanadiv Charitable Foundation, renamed the Rothschild Foundation Europe in 2007. He is a founding member of the Jewish Forum for Justice and Human Rights, and a former editor of Patterns of Prejudice, a quarterly academic journal focusing on the sociology of race and ethnicity.

Lerman served on the Runnymede Trust's Commission on Antisemitism in the early 1990s, and was appointed in 1998 to its Commission on the Future of Multi-Ethnic Britain. He also sits on the advisory committee of the Imperial War Museum's Holocaust exhibition. He has contributed to The Guardian.

== Biography ==
Lerman spent much of his early life within the Habonim and trained to become a madrikh (youth leader) at the Jewish Agency's Jerusalem Institute for Foreign Leaders. He became Britain's first mazkir, (foreign youth leader) at age 22. He made aliyah to Israel in 1970, and stayed there until 1973. From 1979 to 2009, he worked for Jewish organisations, mainly as a researcher for the Institute of Jewish Affairs, but also worked as a director of the Rothschild's Hanadiv Charity.

== New antisemitism ==
In the Israeli newspaper Haaretz, Lerman argued that the concept of a "new antisemitism" has brought about "a revolutionary change in the discourse about anti-Semitism". He wrote that most contemporary discussions concerning antisemitism have become focused on issues concerning Israel and Zionism, and that the equation of anti-Zionism with antisemitism has become for many a "new orthodoxy". He added that this redefinition has often resulted in "Jews attacking other Jews for their alleged anti-Semitic anti-Zionism". While Lerman accepts that exposing alleged Jewish antisemitism is "legitimate in principle", he added that the growing literature in this field "exceeds all reason"; the attacks are often vitriolic, and encompass views that are not inherently anti-Zionist.

Lerman argued that this redefinition has had unfortunate repercussions. He wrote that serious scholarly research into contemporary antisemitism has become "virtually non-existent", and that the subject is now most frequently studied and analysed by "people lacking any serious expertise in the subject, whose principal aim is to excoriate Jewish critics of Israel and to promote the "anti-Zionism = anti-Semitism" equation." Lerman concluded that this redefinition has ultimately served to stifle legitimate discussion, and that it cannot create a basis on which to fight antisemitism.

When Yale University decided to close the Yale Initiative for the Interdisciplinary Study of Antisemitism, many charged it was political in nature, owing to the Initiative's controversial focus on Muslim antisemitism. Abby Wisse Schachter, a commentator at the New York Post, wrote that Yale "almost certainly" terminated the program because it "refused to ignore the most virulent, genocidal and common form of Jew-hatred today: Muslim anti-Semitism." But Lerman welcomed the decision and argued that the organisation was politicised and its demise should be welcomed by those who "genuinely support the principle of the objective, dispassionate study of contemporary antisemitism."

Lerman believes claims that London is the "hub of international efforts to delegitimise Israel and that British Jews are subject to a constant barrage of media-driven anti-Zionist propaganda that borders on, or overlaps with, antisemitism" are grossly exaggerated. His concern has been to stimulate discussion about the impact of Israel on European Jewry, and on the extent to which the rise in anti-Semitism is influenced by actions taken by the Israeli government.

== Commentary on anti-Muslim sentiment ==
Lerman sees links between the Israeli far-right and Islamophobic groups in Europe such as Geert Wilders and his anti-Islam Party for Freedom. Wilders and leaders of four other far-right parties have visited Israel, despite their antisemitic roots. Lerman has commented that since 9/11, Israel has sought to identify itself with the US as a "fellow victim of Islamist terror". As Al Qaeda demonised America and Israel, the "Zionist right" began to argue a "new antisemitism" was a rising threat, thus recasting antisemitism as principally anti-Israel rhetoric from Muslim groups.

On gauging the threat of antisemitism, Lerman quoted Rabbi David Goldberg: "at the present time, it is far easier and safer to be a Jew than a Muslim, a black person or an east European asylum seeker." Lerman criticised an attack by The Jewish Chronicle on the Pears Foundation accusing them of "blindness towards jihadi propagandists". He considered obsessiveness against attempts to open a dialogue with Hamas as "actively encouraging their racism, antisemitism and terrorism", and regarded it as a generalised anti-Muslim discourse.

== The Making and Unmaking of a Zionist ==
In his 2012 book, The Making and Unmaking of a Zionist, Lerman analyzes his positions over five decades, from early Zionist idealism to criticism of Zionism. He is not an 'anti-Zionist'. He argues that Zionism is a "done deal", like the French Revolution, something that occurred in the past. He contends that self-identifying Zionists in the diaspora are complicit in supporting an unjust occupation, and argues Israel must abrogate the Law of Return, change its Jewish character, and become a binational state for Jews and Palestinians. The diaspora must choose between universal values and multiculturalism, and Jewish exclusivity.

In an op-ed for The New York Times after the 2014 Gaza Strip war, Lerman concluded that, “The only Zionism of any consequence today is xenophobic and exclusionary, a Jewish ethno-nationalism inspired by religious messianism. It is carrying out an open-ended project of national self-realization to be achieved through colonization and purification of the tribe.”

== Selected publications ==
Books

- (ed.) Antisemitism World Report. Institute of Jewish Affairs/Institute for Jewish Policy Research, published annually from 1992 to 1998.
- (ed.) The Jewish Communities of the World. A Comprehensive Guide. Macmillan, 1989.
- The Making and Unmaking of a Zionist, Pluto Press, London 2012.
- Bad News for Labour: Antisemitism, the Party and Public Belief, Greg Philo, Mike Berry, Justin Schlosberg, Antony Lerman, David Miller, Pluto Press, 2019.
- Whatever Happened to Antisemitism? Redefinition and the Myth of the 'Collective Jew', Pluto Press, London 2022

Papers

- with Kosmin, Barry and Goldberg, Jacqueline. "The attachment of British Jews to Israel," JPR Report No. 5, Institute for Jewish Policy Research, 1997.
- with Miller, Stephen and Schmool, Marlena. Social and political attitudes of British Jews. Institute for Jewish Policy Research, 1996.
- "Fictive anti-Zionism: Third World, Arab and Muslim Variations," in Wistrich, Robert S. (ed.) Anti-Zionism and Antisemitism in the Contemporary World. Macmillan in association with the Institute of Jewish Affairs, 1990.
- "The Art of Holocaust Remembering," in Jewish Quarterly, Autumn 1989.
- "Le Pen and LaRouche: Political Extremism in Democratic Societies" in Frankel, William. Survey of Jewish Affairs, 1987. Fairleigh Dickinson University Press, 1988.

Opinion pieces

- Legitimizing Lieberman, The Guardian, 4 August 2009.
- Must Jews always see themselves as victims?, The Independent, 7 March 2009.
- Misdirected passion, New Statesman, 11 December 2008.
- Jews attacking Jews, Haaretz, 7 October 2008.
- Sense on antisemitism, Prospect, issue 77, August 2002.
