= Herbert A. Strauss =

American historian (1918–2005)

Herbert Arthur Strauss (1 June 1918, Würzburg, Germany – 11 March 2005, New York, NY) was a German-born American historian.

== Life ==
Strauss spent his youth in his home town of Würzburg, Bavaria. After school he began a commercial apprenticeship. In 1936 he moved to Berlin, where he headed the Nationale Jugendbüro at the Reichsvertretung der Deutschen Juden. From 1936 until its closure in 1942, he studied at the Hochschule für die Wissenschaft des Judentums in Berlin to prepare for his emigration to Palestine. In March 1942 he obtained his Abitur.

The planned and already approved emigration to Britain failed due to the outbreak of war in September 1939, and from autumn 1940 onwards he worked for the Jewish community in Berlin as an auxiliary Rabbi alongside his studies. In January 1942, he was obliged to do forced labor as a street sweeper. In order to escape the impending deportation, he went underground in October 1942 with his fiancée Lotte Kahle, his later wife. In June 1943 he managed to escape with the help of Luise Meier in Berlin, Elise Höfler and Josef Höfler from Gottmadingen across the green border into the canton of Schaffhausen, Switzerland. Both he (Über dem Abgrund) and his wife (Über den grünen Hüge) describe the years of persecution in a book. At the University of Bern he studied history and received his doctorate in 1946 under Werner Näf with the topic Staat, Bürger, Mensch. Die Grundrechtsdebatte der Deutschen Nationalversammlung zu Frankfurt 1848/49.

In 1946 he went to the USA and taught there as a professor of history at the City College of New York. In 1982, he was appointed to Technische Universität Berlin to become the founding director of the Zentrum für Antisemitismusforschung. In 1990 he returned to the USA; his successor at the Centre was Wolfgang Benz.

His social science research focused on Jewish emancipation, the history of science and emigration, and the politics of persecution. Strauss died in New York at the age of 86.

== Writings ==
- Staat, Bürger, Mensch: Die Debatten der deutschen Nationalversammlung 1848/1849 über die Grundrechte (Berner Untersuchungen zur Allgemeinen Geschichte. (Issue 15). Sauerländer, Aarau 1946 (Dissertation, University of Bern).
- with Kurt Grosmann: Gegenwart im Rückblick. Festgabe für die Jüdische Gemeinde zu Berlin 25 Jahre nach dem Neubeginn. Stiehm, Heidelberg 1970.
- Biographisches Handbuch der deutschsprachigen Emigration nach 1933. K. G. Saur, München/New York/London/Paris 1980, ISBN 3-598-10087-6 (with Werner Röder, vol. I: Politik, Wirtschaft, öffentliches Leben) Google Books – Digitalization (in extracts).
- "Jewish Emigration from Germany. Nazi Policies and Jewish Responses", part I–II. In Leo Baeck Institute Year Book 25, 1980, pp. 313–361, and Leo Baeck Institute Year Book 26, 1981, pp. 343–409.
- edited with Norbert Kampe: Antisemitismus: von der Judenfeindschaft zum Holocaust. Bundeszentrale für Polit. Bildung, Bonn 1984 (Schriftenreihe der Bundeszentrale für Politische Bildung).
- edited with Christhard Hoffmann: Juden und Judentum in der Literatur. dtv, Munich 1985, ISBN 3-423-10513-5.
- Nationalsozialismus: Emigration. Deutsche Wissenschaftler nach 1933. Entlassung und Vertreibung. List of Displaced German Scholars 1936. Supplementary List of Displaced German Scholars 1937. The Emergency Committee in Aid of Displaced Foreign Scholars, Report 1941. Reprints, Technische Universität Berlin, Berlin 1987.
- Lerntage des Zentrums für Antisemitismusforschung VII: Lerntag über Ausländerpolitik 1989: Das Ende der Integration? with Werner Bergmann und Christhard Hoffmann, gemeinsam mit der Research Foundation for Jewish Immigration, New York – am 12. November 1989. TU Berlin, Berlin 1990.
- Über dem Abgrund. Eine jüdische Jugend in Deutschland 1918–1943. Campus Verlag, Frankfurt 1997, ISBN 3-593-35687-2.

== Books about Strauss ==
- Rainer Erb, Michael Schmidt (ed.): Antisemitismus und jüdische Geschichte: Studien zu Ehren von Herbert A. Strauss. Grußwort von Shepard Stone. Wissenschaftlicher Autorenverlag, Berlin 1987.
