= Yale Program for the Study of Antisemitism =

Academic center

The Yale Program for the Study of Antisemitism (YPSA) is an interdisciplinary center at Yale University devoted to the academic study of historical and contemporary antisemitism. Housed within the Whitney Humanities Center, YPSA sponsors lectures and conferences, produces videos, and provides research grants to Yale faculty and students. YPSA was founded in 2011 following the controversial closure of the Yale Initiative for the Interdisciplinary Study of Antisemitism. The current director of YPSA is Maurice Samuels, Betty Jane Anlyan Professor of French at Yale University.

== History ==
After a review by a faculty committee, then Provost of Yale University Peter Salovey announced in June 2011 the closing of the Yale Initiative for the Interdisciplinary Study of Antisemitism (YIISA). Salovey cited insufficient scholarly activity as the main reason for the closing of the center.

After outcry over the closing of YIISA, a small group of Yale faculty met with Salovey and then-President Richard Levin to ask that a new center be created. On June 19, 2011, the university announced the creation of the Yale Program for the Study of Antisemitism (YPSA), with Professor Maurice Samuels, director of graduate studies for the French department and an expert on French Jews, as the inaugural director. According to Samuels, the YPSA would focus on research and not policy work to bring a renewed scholarly focus to antisemitism studies. Samuels' appointment was praised by Jeffrey Alexander, sociology professor and member of the YIISA's governance committee, who noted Samuels' "impeccable" academic credentials.

In a statement on June 21, 2011, Samuels announced that the new program would focus on both historical and contemporary forms of antisemitism: “Like many, I am concerned by the recent upsurge in violence against Jews around the world and YPSA will address these concerns,” Samuels wrote. “I also believe that we benefit a great deal by placing current events into historical context. YPSA will not refrain from exploring any controversial contemporary topic.”

== Activities ==
Since its founding in 2011, YPSA has organized conferences on a number of topics relating to both contemporary and historical forms of antisemitism, such as: “Antisemitism in France: Past, Present, Future” (2012);“Exodus or Exile: The Departure of Jews from Muslim Countries, 1948-1978” (2013); and “Troubling Legacies: Antisemitism in Antiquity and its Aftermath” (2014). It also runs the Benjamin and Barbara Zucker Lecture Series, which has featured a number of talks on recent cases of Islamist terrorist attacks on Jews in Europe and elsewhere.

Beginning in 2012, YPSA launched the Salo W. and Jeannette M. Baron Research grants for five students and five faculty members to promote scholarship. YPSA also houses the Yale Archive for Iranian Jewish Testimonies, founded in 2014 by journalist Roya Hakakian.
