= The Legacy of Jihad =

2005 book by Andrew G. Bostom

- The Legacy of Jihad cover page
- Author: Andrew G. Bostom
- Language: English
- Subject: Jihad
- Genre: Islamic history
- Publisher: Prometheus Books
- Publication date: 25 October 2005
- Publication place: United States
- Pages: 759
- ISBN: 978-1591026020
- OCLC: 900607541
- Followed by: The Legacy of Islamic Antisemitism

The Legacy of Jihad: Islamic Holy War and the Fate of Non-Muslims is a book by Andrew G. Bostom, a medical doctor who has written several other works discussing Islamic intolerance. The foreword was written by author and ex-Muslim, Ibn Warraq. The book is framed as a rejection of the notion that Islam is a peaceful religion and claims that Islam is violent and intolerant.

== Contents ==
The book provides a textual analysis of the concept and practice of jihad ("war against unbelievers in the path of Allah") by examining Islamic theological and legal texts, eyewitness historical accounts of Muslim and non-Muslim chroniclers, and essays by scholars analyzing jihad and the conditions imposed upon the non-Muslim peoples conquered by jihad campaigns.

== Reception ==
Hans Jansen wrote in Middle East Quarterly that the "book amply documents the systematic and destructive character of Islamic jihad, refuting the much-repeated argument that jihad is a 'rich' concept that has many meanings and that jihad first of all signifies 'inner struggle.' Jihad is first of all war, bloodshed, subjugation, and expansion of the faith by violence."

Dean Barnett wrote in The Weekly Standard that the book "is likely to be controversial because it traces a history that polite society often seems unwilling to discuss," while noting that it is "a thorough work; hardly an act of offensive jihad in the last 1,300 years has escaped Bostom's scholarship."

In The Jerusalem Post, Raphael Israeli wrote that Bostom "deserves credit for this first huge step, to be followed by others. At any rate, this is one of those books with a long shelf-life, because whatever further investigation and interpretation is done, it will stand alone as the impressive accomplishment of an autodidact layman, which many specialists have reasons to envy."
