= Robert S. Wistrich =

Professor at the Hebrew University of Jerusalem (1945–2015)

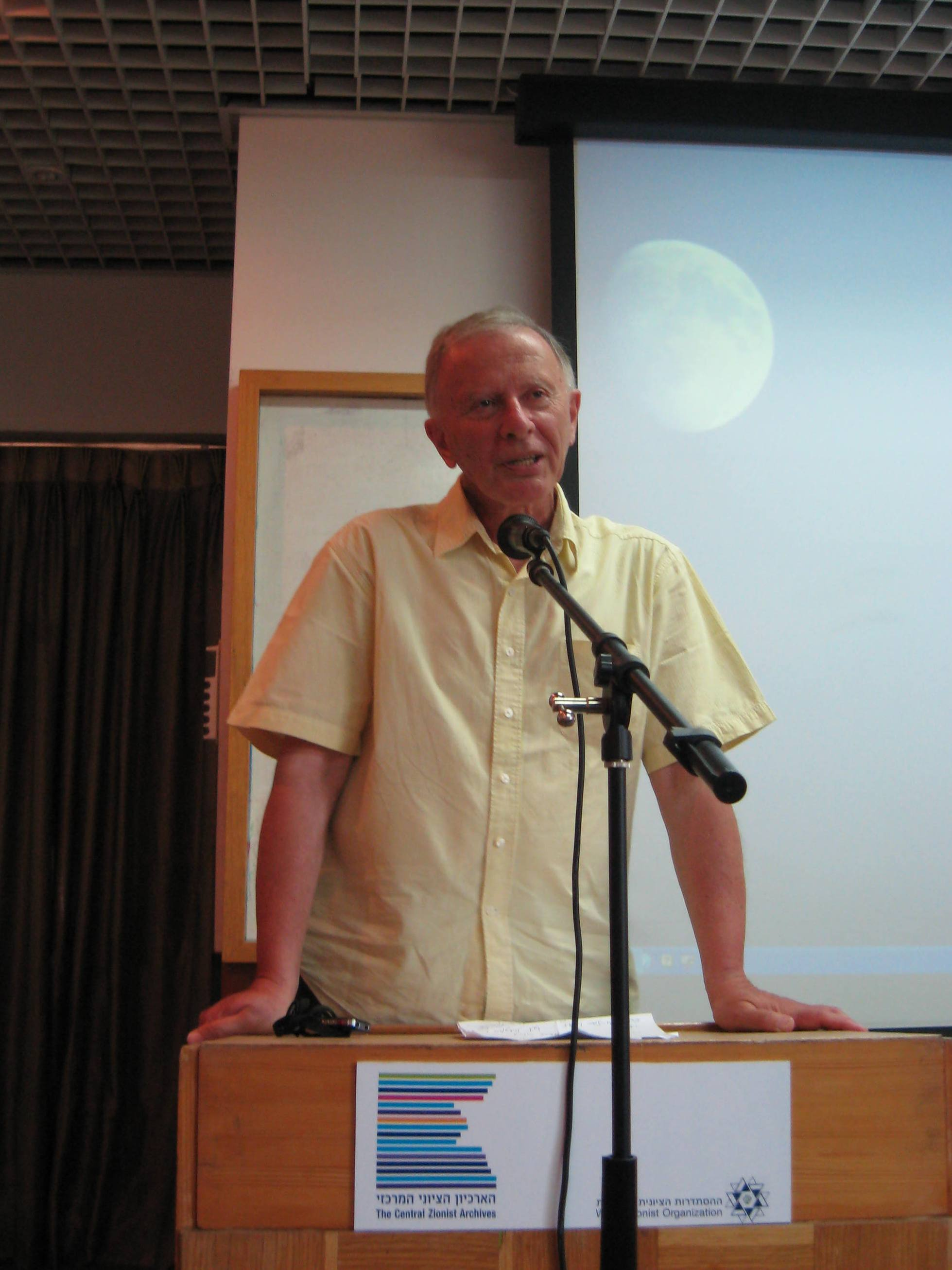
Wistrich in 2013

Robert Solomon Wistrich (April 7, 1945 – May 19, 2015) was a scholar of antisemitism, considered one of the world's foremost authorities on antisemitism.

The Erich Neuberger Professor of European and Jewish history at the Hebrew University of Jerusalem, and he was also the head of the university's Vidal Sassoon International Center for the Study of Antisemitism (SICSA). Wistrich considered antisemitism "the longest hatred" and viewed anti-Zionism as its latest incarnation. According to Scott Ury, "More than any other scholar, Wistrich has helped integrate traditional Zionist interpretations of Jewish history, society, and fate into the study of antisemitism." Other researchers have reproduced much of his work without questioning its founding assumptions.

== Biography ==
Robert Wistrich was born in Lenger, in the Kazakh Soviet Socialist Republic on April 7, 1945. His parents were leftist Polish Jews who had moved to Lviv in 1940 in order to escape from the Germans; however, they discovered that Soviet-style totalitarianism was little better than Nazism. In 1942 they moved to Kazakhstan, where Wistrich's father was imprisoned twice by the NKVD. After World War II, the Wistrichs returned to Poland. Later, finding the post-war environment in Poland to be dangerously anti-Semitic, the family moved to France and then to England. Wistrich grew up in England, where he went to Kilburn Grammar School, where in Wistrich's words, he was taught by "Walter Isaacson, a refugee from Nazi Germany who first taught me how to think independently" His parents later returned to Poland under a repatriation agreement between Stalin and the Polish government-in-exile.

In December 1962, aged 17, Wistrich won an Open Scholarship to study history at Queens' College, Cambridge. In 1966 he graduated with a BA (Hons) from the University of Cambridge, which was raised to a MA degree in 1969. At Cambridge, he founded Circuit, a literary and arts magazine that he co-edited between 1966 and 1969. Between 1969 and 1970, during a study year in Israel, he became the youngest ever literary editor of New Outlook, a left-wing monthly in Tel Aviv, founded by Martin Buber. Wistrich received his Ph.D. from the University of London in 1974.

== Academic career ==
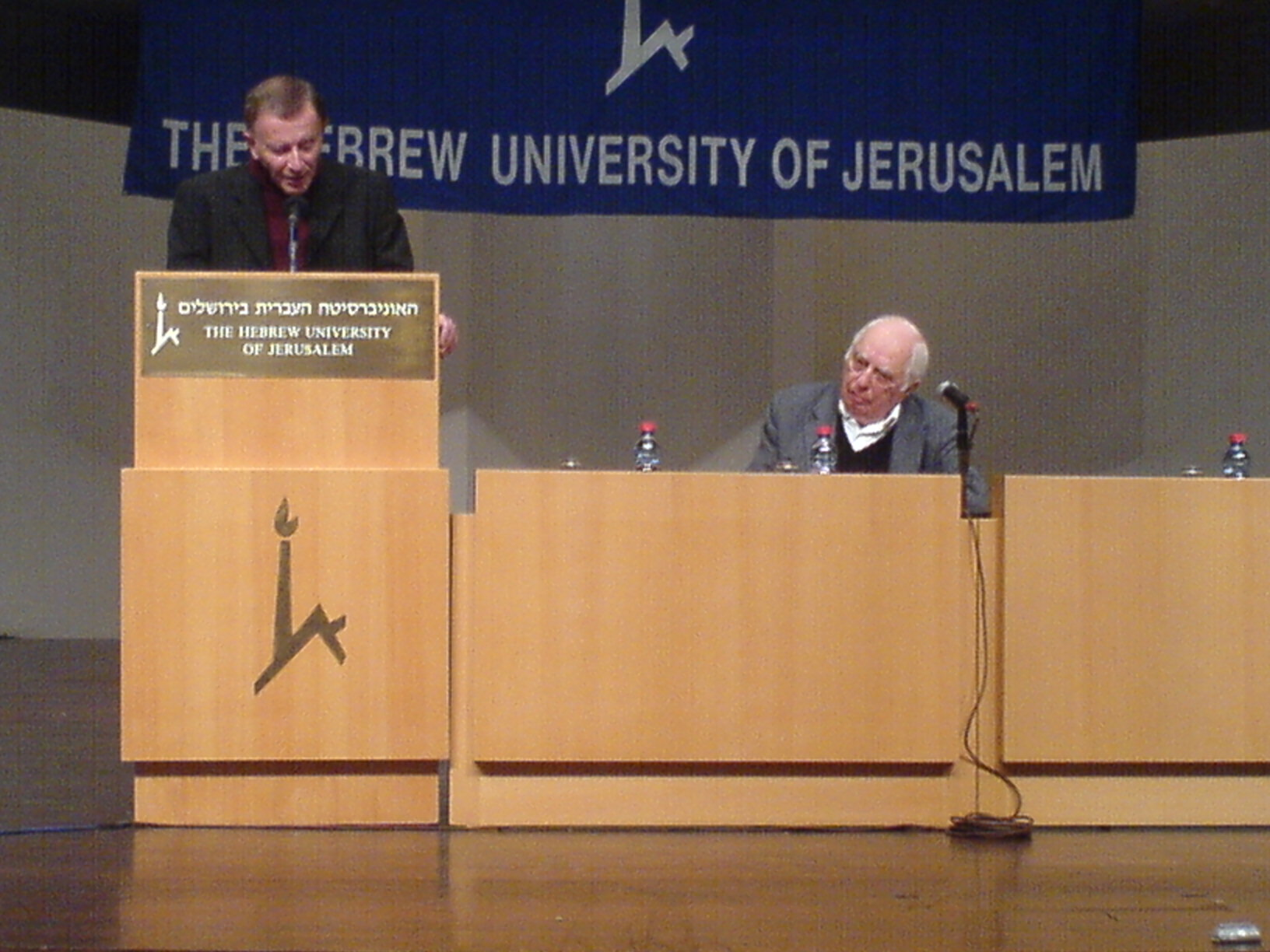
Wistrich (left) and Bernard Lewis, 2007

Between 1974 and 1980, Wistrich was Director of Research at the Institute of Contemporary History and the Wiener Library (at that time the largest research library on the Third Reich existing in Europe) and the editor of the Wiener Library Bulletin in London. Appointed a Research Fellow at the British Academy, he had already written several well-received books by the time he was given tenure at the Hebrew University of Jerusalem in 1982.

Between 1991 and 1995, Wistrich was appointed the first holder of the Chair of Jewish Studies at University College London, in addition to his position at the Hebrew University of Jerusalem. He also wrote several dramas for BBC Radio and Kol Yisrael on the lives of historical figures ranging from Leon Trotsky to Theodor Herzl. In 2003, Wistrich acted as the chief historical consultant for the BBC documentary Blaming the Jews, which explores contemporary Muslim antisemitism. He also served as the academic advisor for the controversial documentary film Obsession: Radical Islam's War Against the West (2005).

As head of the Vidal Sassoon International Center for the Study of Antisemitism (SICSA) at the Hebrew University of Jerusalem since 2002, Wistrich was a sought-after lecturer and scholar on antisemitism. He served as a rapporteaur on antisemitism for the State Department, OECD, Council of Europe, United Nations Commission on Human Rights, and the Office of the United Nations High Commissioner for Human Rights. Wistrich also served as a member of the board of the Israel Council on Foreign Relations.

He was one of six scholars who sat on the International Catholic-Jewish Historical Commission from 1999 to 2001 to examine the wartime record of Pope Pius XII, with special reference to the Holocaust. From 2002, he was the director of SICSA, and edited its journal, Antisemitism International.

Wistrich wrote prolifically on antisemitism in the Islamic world, insisting that "The Islamists have never made any secret of the centrality for them of the religious dimension of the Muslim–Jewish conflict—something very poorly understood in the West. This is clearly spelled out in the radically antisemitic Hamas Covenant of 1988, which constitutes the ideological basis for its continuing jihad to annihilate Israel. The Covenant draws on an ancient hadith attributed to Muhammad himself in which he purportedly declares: 'The Day of Judgment will not come until Muslims fight the Jews, when the Jew will hide behind stones and trees. The stones and trees will say, O Muslims, O Abdullah [servant of Allah], there is a Jew behind me, come and kill him.'"

In 2014, Wistrich authored an exhibition entitled "The 3,500 year relationships of the Jewish people to the Land of Israel". The exhibition was scheduled for display at the headquarters of UNESCO, but was canceled under pressure from Arab nations. The exhibit eventually opened six months later after the phrase "Land of Israel" was replaced with "Holy Land". In response to the controversy, Wistrich said the cancellation "completely destroyed any claim that UNESCO could possibly have to be representing the universal values of toleration, mutual understanding, respect for the other and narratives that are different, engaging with civil society organizations and the importance of education."

== Books ==
Over his career, Wistrich edited and published dozens of notable books about Jews and antisemitism. In 1985 his book Socialism and the Jews won the joint award of SICSA at the Hebrew University of Jerusalem and the American Jewish Committee. His 1989 book The Jews of Vienna in the Age of Franz Joseph received the Austrian State Prize in History. His next book, Antisemitism: The Longest Hatred (1991), won the Jewish Quarterly-Wingate Literary Prize in the UK a year later, and was the basis for The Longest Hatred, a three-hour British-American TV documentary on antisemitism, which Wistrich co-edited. In 1993, he also scripted Good Morning, Mr. Hitler, an award-winning documentary on Nazi art commissioned by the UK's Channel 4.

His 2010 book A Lethal Obsession: Anti-Semitism from Antiquity to the Global Jihad was awarded Best Book of the Year Prize by the Journal for the Study of Antisemitism.

== Legacy ==
Wistrich died of a heart attack on May 19, 2015, in Rome, Italy. He was due to address the Italian Senate about the rise of antisemitism in Europe.

At his death, he was considered the world's foremost authority on antisemitism. Malcolm Hoenlein of the Conference of Presidents of Major American Jewish Organizations called his death a tragic loss to "the entire Jewish community and to all those engaged in the efforts to counter resurgent antisemitism". Irwin Cotler, former Minister of Justice and Attorney General of Canada, said "the world of academe has lost an outstanding scholar and historian; the world of Jewish studies has lost a seminal thinker." Charles A. Small of the Institute for the Study of Global Antisemitism and Policy called Wistrich "a scholar committed to the sober documentation of facts and the highest caliber of scholarship."

According to the Jerusalem Post, Wistrich was an outspoken critic of European policy regarding antisemitism and pessimistic about the future of Jewish communities in Europe.

Wistrich was the most prolific writer on antisemitism for some decades. Scott Ury has argued that many of the core themes in Wistrich's approach to antisemitism emerged in the works of his predecessor, the polemical Ukrainian-Israeli historian Shmuel Ettinger (1919–1988) who, Ury maintains, was a pivotal figure in restoring the ideas about both antisemitism and anti-Zionism that had been current a century earlier, from Leon Pinsker and Theodor Herzl and other early Zionist thinkers onwards. That original outlook, which emphasized the inevitability and uniqueness of antisemitism in the Christian world, and the need to overcome it by affirming Jewish national identity, had been challenged after WW2 by historians like Salo Wittmayer Baron, philosophers such as Hannah Arendt, Theodor Adorno and Max Horkheimer, who denied that a normal Jewish life could not continue in the diaspora, that Jewish history and the Jewish people should not be defined in terms of a perennial antagonism, and that antisemitism is better approached in terms of specific historical contexts and within the wider analytical frameworks afforded by the more general issues of prejudice and racism. From this perspective, Wistrich's late embrace of the idea that antisemitism was a "historically continuous, unique, and potentially ineradicable phenomenon", his polemical and visceral anger at the Left's criticism of Israel which he viewed as a "betrayal" of Jews, and his anxieties over the putative emergence of a new antisemitism all reflect points made by the earliest Zionists in the context of comparable tensions at the end of the 19th century in Europe. For Ury, the resurgence of the old paradigm evidenced in the works of Ettinger and Wistrich, to the point that they now form the "dominant academic and public framework" for studying antisemitism, is puzzling. For the re-emergence of "assumptions, concepts, and paradigms that were introduced and canonized in debates that shaped turn-of-the-century society and politics across Eastern and Central Europe" in contemporary scholarship re-embraces "a set of postulates that supply ready-made answers to familiar questions" which only lead, in his view, to circular arguments. The line between politics and scholarship is consequently blurred.

In the last article he wrote before his death, which was published posthumously, entitled "The Anti-Zionist Mythology of the Left", he declared: "The negative symbolization of Israel and the Jews in this abject discourse is not, of course, confined to the left. False analogies, misleading amalgams, and Orwellian doublespeak long ago replaced intellectual integrity or reasoned thought in the anti-Zionist camp—transcending older political divides. This is as true of liberals, conservatives, or proto-fascists as it is of leftists. The relentless efforts over the last forty years to equate Zionism with racism, colonialism, ethnic cleansing, apartheid, or Nazism are indeed among the more pathological symptoms of a universal pollution of contemporary political vocabulary. It is, however, the 'anti-racist' pretensions of the anti-Zionist left that make their specific betrayal of socialist values particularly repugnant and shameful."

== Published works ==
=== Selected books ===
- Revolutionary Jews from Marx to Trotsky. Barnes & Noble Books, 1976. ISBN 0-06-497806-0
- The Left Against Zion. Vallentine Mitchell & Co, 1979. ISBN 0-85303-199-1
- Who's Who in Nazi Germany. Weidenfeld and Nicolson, London, 1982. ISBN 0-415-12723-8
- Socialism and the Jews. Oxford University Press, 1982.
- Trotsky: Fate of a Revolutionary. Stein & Day. 1982. ISBN 0-8128-2774-0.
- The Jews of Vienna in the Age of Franz Joseph. Oxford University Press, 1989.
- Between Redemption and Perdition: Modern Antisemitism and Jewish Identity. Routledge, 1990. ISBN 0-415-04233-X
- Anti-Zionism and Antisemitism in the Contemporary World. New York University Press, 1990. ISBN 0-8147-9237-5
- Antisemitism, the Longest Hatred. Pantheon, 1992.
- Terms of Survival. Routledge, 1995. ISBN 0-415-10056-9
- A Weekend in Munich: Art, Propaganda and Terror in the Third Reich (with Luke Holland). Trafalgar Square, 1996. ISBN 1-85793-318-4
- Theodor Herzl: Visionary of the Jewish State. New York and Jerusalem: Herzl Press and Magnes Press, 1999, 390 pages.
- Demonizing the Other: Antisemitism, Racism and Xenophobia. Routledge, 1999. ISBN 90-5702-497-7
- Hitler and the Holocaust. Random House, 2001.
- Nietzsche: Godfather of Fascism? Princeton, 2002.
- Laboratory for World Destruction. Germans and Jews in Central Europe, University of Nebraska Press, Lincoln, Nebraska 2007. ISBN 978-0-8032-1134-6
- A Lethal Obsession: Anti-Semitism from Antiquity to the Global Jihad, Random House, 2010. ISBN 978-1-4000-6097-9
- From Ambivalence to Betrayal. The Left, the Jews and Israel, University of Nebraska Press, Lincoln, Nebraska 2012. ISBN 0803240767
