= Catherine Chatterley =

Canadian historian

Catherine Chatterley is a Canadian historian, specializing in the study of modern European history, the Holocaust, and research on antisemitism, and is the founding director of the Canadian Institute for the Study of Antisemitism (CISA). Chatterley is Editor-in-Chief of Antisemitism Studies, a journal devoted to the study of antisemitism published by Indiana University Press. Chatterley appeared in the documentary called Unmasked: Judeophobia (2011), where she was one of the scholars interviewed. That same year, she was invited as an expert scholar to participate in the Canadian All-Party Parliamentary Inquiry into Antisemitism.

Syracuse University Press published her first book, Disenchantment: George Steiner and the Meaning of Western Civilization After Auschwitz, in their series on Religion, Theology, and the Holocaust, edited by Steven T. Katz. Disenchantment was named a 2011 National Jewish Book Award Finalist in the category of Modern Jewish Thought and Experience. Alongside Juan Asensio in France and Ricardo Gil Soeiro in Portugal, Chatterley is recognized as a leading scholar of George Steiner, an internationally renowned cultural critic, and has published two chapters in international collections about his work, both edited by Ricardo Gil Soeiro. Steiner died on February 3, 2020, and Chatterley wrote an obituary for the Times of Israel.

== Education ==
Chatterley studied European history, the Near East and Jewish studies at the University of Manitoba. She later earned a master's degree at Concordia University in Montreal, where she studied the history of European ideas. Her master's thesis, Steiner's Shoah: A Conversation in Silence (1997), examined the work of literary critic George Steiner.

Chatterley continued her studies at the University of Chicago, focusing on modern European and Jewish history and literature by German-Jewish writers. Historians Moishe Postone and Michael Geyer supervised her doctoral research. Her doctoral thesis, which she completed in 2007, became the basis of her book Disenchantment: George Steiner and the Meaning of Western Civilization After Auschwitz.

== Teaching ==
Chatterley taught European history at the University of Winnipeg from 2002 to 2008 and at the University of Manitoba from 2007 to 2018. At Manitoba, she was an adjunct professor in the history department, where she taught the history of antisemitism.

In September 2013, she began teaching a nine-week course for the public through the Canadian Institute for the Study of Antisemitism. Based on her university course, it used lectures, films and discussion to explore the history of hostility towards Jewish people, from its religious origins through the Middle Ages and the Nazi era. She developed the course after community members and students' parents asked to attend her university lectures.

== Founding of Canadian Institute for the Study of Antisemitism ==
Chatterley created the Canadian Institute for the Study of Antisemitism (CISA) in the summer of 2010 to "help facilitate the scholarly study of antisemitism and to educate Canadians about the phenomenon in its classical and contemporary forms." CISA is the first national academic institution in Canada dedicated to the scholarly study of a subject that is usually addressed by political advocacy organizations. It is the only such institution in the world founded by a non-Jewish scholar. The Institute sponsors the leading academic periodical on the subject. Antisemitism Studies is published by Indiana University Press and Chatterley is Editor-in-Chief.

== Involvement in public debates ==
Chatterley was involved in the public debate over the place of a permanent Holocaust gallery proposed for the Canadian Museum for Human Rights (CMHR), scheduled to open in Winnipeg in September 2014. In an editorial criticizing the attempt to remove the proposed Holocaust gallery from the museum, she stated, "the problem with the CMHR is it is mired in the politics of Canadian ethnic identity rather than rooted in the scholarly study of genocide, Holocaust, and human rights. Subjective feelings are influencing content and design choices rather than objective historical and legal reality and this does not bode well for the international reputation of this institution." This article also described the offensive UCCLA postcard campaign using Orwellian imagery to target supporters of the Holocaust gallery, depicting them as pigs. Chatterley stated unequivocally, "the fact that this kind of postcard was distributed in Canada in 2011, without shame or conscience, by an organization that claims to protect civil liberties, is astonishing. This alone demonstrates the clear need for this museum, its permanent Holocaust gallery, and for the Canadian Institute for the Study of Antisemitism." In 2013, Chatterley interviewed the former curator of the Holocaust gallery and provided the first concrete published information about the content of the CMHR for the public. Holocaust and Genocide Studies published her study of the conflicts and controversies at the CMHR, entitled "Canada's Struggle with Holocaust Memorialization: The War Museum Controversy, Ethnic Identity Politics, and the Canadian Museum for Human Rights."

As a scholar of German history and the Holocaust, Chatterley was consulted in 2014 about the problem of stolen art in Canadian museum collections. Heritage Canada has sponsored the Holocaust-era Provenance Research and Best-Practice Guidelines Project, through which they investigated six art galleries in Canada including the Winnipeg Art Gallery.

Chatterley has also critiqued comments made by religion writer Karen Armstrong in the wake of the Charlie Hebdo and Kosher Grocery murders in Paris. In a Dutch interview, Armstrong claimed that the murders of French Jews by the Hebdo terrorists had nothing to do with antisemitism: "The supermarket attack in Paris was about Palestine, about ISIS. It had nothing to do with antisemitism; many of them are Semites themselves. But they attempt to conquer Palestine and we're not talking about that. We're too implicated and we don't know what to do with it." In response, Chatterley wrote a critical op-ed for The Huffington Post correcting her historical and conceptual errors and arguing that the murders of Jews in Paris had everything to do with antisemitism.

== Publications ==
- "Canada's Struggle with Holocaust Memorialization: The War Museum Controversy, Ethnic Identity Politics, and the Canadian Museum for Human Rights," Holocaust and Genocide Studies (2015) 29 (2): 189-211.
- Disenchantment: The Meaning of Western Civilization After Auschwitz (Syracuse: Syracuse University Press, 2011)
- "The Antisemitic Imagination," in Global Antisemitism: A Crisis of Modernity, edited by Charles Asher Small (Leiden: Brill, 2013)
- "Language, Humanity, and the Holocaust: The Steinerian Triad," in The Wounds of Possibility: Essays on George Steiner, edited by Ricardo Gil Soeiro (UK: Cambridge Scholars Publishing, 2012)
- "We Come After: The Holocaust in Steinerian Thought, 1952-1971," in O Pensamento Tornado Danca. Estudos em Torno do Pensamento de George Steiner, edited by Ricardo Gil Soeiro (Lisbon: Roma Editora, 2009): 96-113.
- Review of Derek Penslar, "Jews and the Military: A History," American Historical Review (2014) 119 (4): 1207-1209.
- Review of Alvin Rosenfeld, editor, "Resurgent Antisemitism: Global Perspectives," Jewish Political Studies Review (Spring 5773/2013), Volume 25, Numbers 1 & 2.
- Review of Ruth Klein, editor, "Nazi Germany, Canadian Responses: Confronting Antisemitism in the Shadow of War," Journal for the Study of Antisemitism (December 2012): 747-751.
- Review of Alon Confino, "Germany as a Culture of Remembrance: Promises and Limits of Writing History," The Hedgehog Review (Summer 2007): 75-78.

Her book, Disenchantment: George Steiner and the Meaning of Western Civilization After Auschwitz, is an intellectual biography of the literary critic. It focuses on his neglected writings on the Holocaust and antisemitism, and explains how and when the Holocaust enters Western consciousness in the decades after World War II.
