= Wolfgang Benz =

German historian (born 1941)

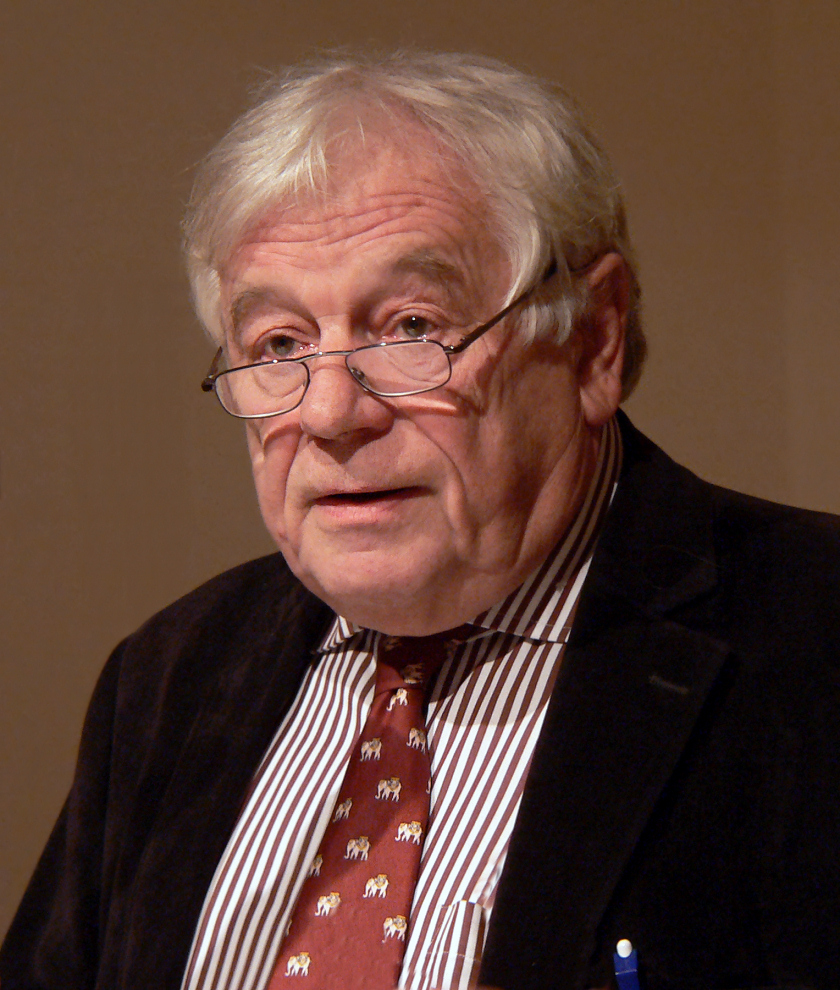
- Born: 9 June 1941 (age 85); Ellwangen, Free People's State of Württemberg, Germany
- Education: LMU Munich, (PhD, 1968)
- Occupations: Historian, anti-semitism researcher
- Known for: Holocaust studies, Antisemitism studies, German history
- Awards: Geschwister-Scholl-Preis (1992)

Wolfgang Benz (born 9 June 1941) is a German historian and antisemitism researcher. He was professor and the director of the Center for Research on Antisemitism of the Technische Universität Berlin from 1990 to 2011. He is considered to be one of the most renowned and well-known historians in modern Germany, and one of the foremost scholars on antisemitism studies. He has been referred to as the "doyen" of antisemitism research.

Benz is member of the advisory board for the Memorial to the Murdered Jews of Europe and was involved in the memorial's design. He has written or published over 200 works.

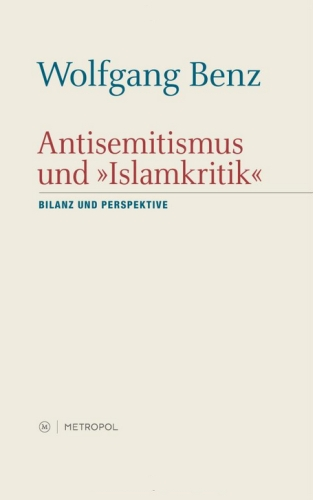
Antisemitismus und "Islamkritik" (2011)

== Personal life ==
Wolfgang Benz grew up in Ellwangen, Southwest Germany. He was born as the youngest of four children of the doctor Ottmar Benz (1900–1976) and his wife Franziska, née Feigen (1896–1967), in Ellwangen an der Jagst and grew up in Aalen (Württemberg) on the eastern edge of the Swabian Jura. Benz studied history, political science and art history at the Goethe University Frankfurt, Kiel University, and LMU Munich. In 1968, he completed his doctoral thesis on under the supervision of Karl Bosl at LMU Munich. From 1969 until 1990, Benz worked at the Institute for Contemporary History at LMU Munich.

In 1985, he was co-founder and editor of Dachauer Hefte and since 1992, he also edits the Jahrbuch für Antisemitismusforschung (Yearbook for Research on Antisemitism). He is also editor of the Zeitschrift für Geschichtswissenschaft (Journal of historical science). Both published by Metropol Verlag. In 1986, he lectured at the University of New South Wales in Sydney. In 1992, Benz was awarded the Geschwister-Scholl-Preis and the Das politische Buch prize of the Friedrich Ebert Foundation, the German social democratic political foundation. Benz received the emeritus status on 21 October 2010. Benz is a member of the advisory board of the Islamophobia Studies Yearbook, edited by Farid Hafez.

== Research and opinions ==
=== Holocaust casualty numbers ===
Benz is known for his research at Technische Universität Berlin, estimating that between 5.29 and 6.2 million Jews were killed by the German Nazi regime during the Holocaust. Benz has been carrying out work on data received after the opening of government archives in Eastern Europe in the 1990s resulting in the adjustment of the death tolls that had been published in the pioneering works by Raul Hilberg, Lucy Dawidowicz and Martin Gilbert. He concluded in 1999:

The goal of annihilating all of the Jews of Europe, as it was proclaimed at the conference in the villa Am Grossen Wannsee in January 1942, was not reached. Yet the six million murder victims make the holocaust a unique crime in the history of mankind. The number of victims—and with certainty the following represent the minimum number in each case—cannot express that adequately. Numbers are just too abstract. However they must be stated in order to make clear the dimension of the genocide: 165,000 Jews from Germany, 65,000 from Austria, 32,000 from France and Belgium, more than 100,000 from the Netherlands, 60,000 from Greece, the same number from Yugoslavia, more than 140,000 from Czechoslovakia, half a million from Hungary, 2.2 million from the Soviet Union, and 2.7 million from Poland. To these numbers must be added all those killed in the pogroms and massacres in Romania and Transitrien [sic!] (over 200,000) and the deported and murdered Jews from Albania and Norway, Denmark and Italy, from Luxembourg and Bulgaria.

— Benz, Wolfgang The Holocaust: A German Historian Examines the Genocide

=== Comparing Islamophobia and Antisemitism ===
Benz claimed in early 2010 in connection with the Minaret controversy in Switzerland that "anti-Semites of the 19th Century and some detractors of the Islam of the 21st Century work with similar methods on their concept of the enemy" and warned against the global discrimination of Muslims, which he saw as a "declaration of war against tolerance and democracy". He was criticized by historian Julius H. Schoeps who claimed Benz's suggestions are "dubious – if not dangerous" and by journalist Henryk M. Broder, pointing out that 'Islamophobia' – unlike Antisemitism – has a real basis, e.g. terrorist acts, the way dissidents are treated in Islamic countries etc. The educationist Micha Brumlik, however, has argued that as far as social-psychological aspect is concerned, Benz was right when comparing today's Islamophobia and antisemitism of the late 19th and early 20th century. The historian Norbert Frei agreed with Brumlik.

=== Opposition to Polish monument ===
Benz opposed the construction of a monument in Berlin to honor Poles who were victims of the German occupation between 1939 and 1945. He preferred the idea of constructing a documentation center to portray the Nazi annihilation policies, the occupation and its effects on all affected peoples.

== Awards ==
As a result of his work, Wolfgang Benz has received multiple awards. Most noticeable is the Geschwister-Scholl-Preis he won in 1992, and shared with Barbara Distel. He received the "Gegen Vergessen – Für Demokratie" prize in 2012, from the organization Gegen Vergessen – Für Demokratie.

== Bibliography ==
Monographs

- Die 101 wichtigsten Fragen. Das Dritte Reich. ("The 101 Most Important Questions: The Third Reich") C. H. Beck. Munich 2006/2007. ISBN 3-406-54142-9 new edition: ISBN 3-406-56849-1
- Was ist Antisemitismus? ("What is Anti-Semitism?") Bundeszentrale für politische Bildung (bpb). Bonn 2004, ISBN 3-89331-562-4 (Review – German)
- Bilder vom Juden. Studien zum alltäglichen Antisemitismus. ("Images of Jews. Studies in Every-Day Anti-Semitism.") C.H. Beck, Munich 2001, ISBN 3-406-47575-2(Review by Susanne Benöhr on H-Soz-Kult)
- A Concise History of the Third Reich. University of California Press, 2007. ISBN 978-0-520-25383-4
- Herrschaft und Gesellschaft im nationalsozialistischen Staat. Studien zur Struktur- und Mentalitätsgeschichte. (Governance and Society in the Nazi State. Studies in the History of Structure and Mentality.) Fischer, Frankfurt am Main 1990, ISBN 3-596-24435-8
- The Holocaust: A German Historian Examines the Genocide. Columbia University Press, 2000, ISBN 978-0-231-11215-4
- Potsdam 1945. Besatzungsherrschaft und Neuaufbau im Vier-Zonen-Deutschland. (Potsdam 1945. Occupation and Reconstruction in Four-Zone-Germany.) 4th edition, dtv, Munich 2005, ISBN 3-423-34230-7
- Ausgrenzung, Vertreibung, Völkermord. Genozid im 20. Jahrhundert. ("Marginalization, Expulsion, Genocide in the 20th Century") Deutscher Taschenbuch-Verlag, Munich 2006, ISBN 978-3-423-34370-1 or ISBN 3-423-34370-2
- Die Protokolle der Weisen von Zion. Die Legende von der jüdischen Weltverschwörung. ("The Protocols of the Elders of Zion. Legends about Jewish World Conspiracy")." C.H.Beck, Munich 2007, ISBN 978-3-406-53613-7 or ISBN 3-406-53613-1

As editor

- Zwischen Antisemitismus und Philosemitismus. Juden in der Bundesrepublik. (Between Anti-Semitism and Philosemitism. Jews in the Federal Republik [of Germany].) Metropol Verlag, Berlin 1991
- Salzgitter. Geschichte und Gegenwart einer deutschen Stadt 1942 – 1992. (Salzgitter. Past and Present of a German Town, 1942–1992.) Munich 1992.
- with Angelika Königseder: Judenfeindschaft als Paradigma (Anti-Judaism as Paradigm.) Studien zur Vorurteilsforschung, Berlin 2002.
- Überleben im Dritten Reich. Juden im Untergrund und ihre Helfer. (Surviving the Third Reich. Jews in the Underground and Their Helpers.) 2003. (also known as Judenretter Review Tübingen e.V.)
- Selbstbehauptung und Opposition. Kirche als Ort des Widerstandes gegen staatliche Diktatur. (Self-Assertion and Opposition. Churches as Places of Resistance against State Dictatorship.) Berlin 2003, ISBN 3-936411-32-8
- Der Hass gegen die Juden. Dimensionen und Formen des Antisemitismus. (Hatred of Jews. Dimensions and Forms of Anti-Semitism.) Reihe Positionen, Perspektiven, Diagnosen (Band 2), Metropol Verlag, Berlin 2008, ISBN 978-3-938690-82-6 oder ISBN 3-938690-82-8
- with Angelika Königseder: Das Konzentrationslager Dachau. Geschichte und Wirkung nationalsozialistischer Repression. (Dachau Concentration Camp. History and Effect of Nazi Repression.) Metropol Verlag, Berlin 2008, ISBN 978-3-940938-10-7
- Handbuch des Antisemitismus. Judenfeindschaft in Geschichte und Gegenwart. (Handbook on Anti-Semitism. Anti-Judaism in Past and Present.) de Gruyter/K. G. Saur, Berlin. 5 Bände (volumes) (planned), so far have appeared:
  - 1. Band (volume 1): Länder und Regionen. (Countries and Regions.) 2008.
  - 2. Band (volume 2): Personen. 1. A–K und 2. L–Z. (Individuals.) 2009.

As co-editor

- with Hermann Graml, Hermann Weiß: Enzyklopädie des Nationalsozialismus. (Encyclopedia on National-Socialism.). 1997 (5th edition, Klett-Cotta und Deutscher Taschenbuch-Verlag (dtv), Stuttgart and Munich 2007, ISBN 978-3-423-34408-1 or ISBN 3-423-34408-3
- with Walter H. Pehle: Encyclopedia of German Resistance to the Nazi Movement. Translated from the 1994 German original Lexikon des deutschen Widerstandes (S. Fischer Verlag, 1994) by Lance W. Garmer. Continuum International Publishing Group, 1996. ISBN 978-0-8264-0945-4 or ISBN 0-8264-0945-8
- with Hermann Graml: Aspekte deutscher Außenpolitik im 20. Jahrhundert. Aufsätze Hans Rothfels zum Gedächtnis. (Aspects of German Foreign Policy in the 20th Century. Essays in Remembrance of Hans Rothfels.) Deutsche Verlags-Anstalt, Stuttgart 1976.
- with Barbara Distel and Angelika Königseder (Redaktion): Der Ort des Terrors. Geschichte der nationalsozialistischen Konzentrationslager. (The Place of Terror. History of Nazi Concentration Camps.) 9 volumes, 2005–2009, ISBN 978-3-406-52960-3 (Review); Contents)
  - 1: Die Organisation des Terrors. (The Organization of Terror.) Co-editor Angelika Königseder. 2005. (2nd edition, 2005). ISBN 978-3-406-52961-0
  - 2: Frühe Lager. Dachau. Emslandlager. (Early Camps. Dachau, Emslandlager.) 2005 ISBN 3-406-52962-3
  - 3: Sachsenhausen, Buchenwald, mit Nebenlagern. (Sachsenhausen, Buchenwald, and Their Satellite Camps.) ISBN 978-3-406-52963-4
  - 4: Flossenbürg, Mauthausen, Ravensbrück. ISBN 978-3-406-52964-1
  - 5: Hinzert, Auschwitz, Neuengamme. ISBN 978-3-406-52965-8
  - 6: Natzweiler, Groß-Rosen, Stutthof. ISBN 978-3-406-52966-5
  - 7: Wewelsburg, Majdanek, Arbeitsdorf, Herzogenbusch (Vught), Bergen-Belsen, Mittelbau-Dora. 2008. ISBN 978-3-406-52967-2
  - 8: Riga. Warschau. Kaunas. Vaivara. Plaszów. Klooga. Chelmo. Belzec. Treblinka. Sobibor. 2008. ISBN 978-3-406-57237-1
  - 9: Arbeitserziehungslager, Durchgangslager, Ghettos, Polizeihaftlager, Sonderlager, Zigeunerlager, Zwangsarbeitslager. (Work Education Camps, Transit Camps, Gettos, Police Custodial Camps. Special Camps. Gypsy Camps. Forced Labor Camps.) 2009 ISBN 978-3-406-57238-8

== Literature ==
- "Wolfgang Benz." In: Kürschners Deutscher Gelehrten-Kalender 2003. 19th ed. Vol I: A – J. K. G. Saur, Munich 2003, ISBN 3-598-23607-7, p. 199
