= Journal of Contemporary Antisemitism =

Academic journal focused on antisemitism

- Discipline: Antisemitism, Jewish studies, Jewish history
- Language: English
- Edited by: Lesley Klaff and Daniel Allington

Publication details
- History: January 1, 2017
- Publisher: Academic Studies Press
- Frequency: Bi-annual
- Impact factor: 0.2 (2022)

Standard abbreviations
- ISO 4: J. Contemp. Antisemit.

Indexing
- ISSN: 2472-9914 (print); 2472-9906 (web)

Links
- Journal homepage; Online access

The Journal of Contemporary Antisemitism (JCA) is a peer-reviewed academic journal published bi-annually since 2017. It is published by Academic Studies Press. The joint editors-in-chief are Lesley Klaff (Sheffield Hallam University) and Daniel Allington. The journal covers the "scholarly, scientific and theoretical analysis of antisemitism from an anti-antisemitism point of view." It is the only active English-language journal devoted entirely to the study of antisemitism.

== History ==
In 2022, David Hirsh launched the London Centre for the Study of Contemporary Antisemitism in association with the Journal of Contemporary Antisemitism to produce peer-reviewed research output and institutionalize work on antisemitism.

Board members include Deborah Lipstadt, U.S. Special Envoy to Monitor and Combat Antisemitism.

== Abstracting and indexing ==
JCA is abstracted and indexed in the EBSCO Discovery Service, Scilit, Semantic Scholar, and X-MOL.

== See also ==
- Journal for the Study of Antisemitism
