= Academic Studies Press =

Scholarly publisher

- Status: Active
- Founded: 2007
- Founder: Igor Nemirovsky
- Country of origin: United States
- Headquarters location: Boston, Massachusetts
- Distribution: Ingram Publisher Services (North America); Eurospan (EMEA, Asia)
- Publication types: Books, academic journals
- Nonfiction topics: Jewish studies, Slavic studies, History, Religious studies, Russian studies
- Official website: www.academicstudiespress.com

Academic Studies Press, (ASP) is an independent scholarly publisher of books and journals, based in Boston, Massachusetts.

== History ==
Founded in 2007, ASP emphasizes Jewish studies and Slavic studies, but also publishes titles in religious studies, comparative literature, and history more broadly. Authors include Jacob Neusner, Fania Oz-Salzberger, Ellendea Proffer Teasley, Maxim D. Shrayer, Mark Lipovetsky, David Berger, Menachem Kellner, Viktor Zhivov, Jerold Auerbach, and Geoffrey Alderman, while works in translation include those of Maimonides, Ahad Ha'am, Mordecai Kaplan, Eliezer Schweid, and Yury Tynyanov. The press also specializes in Ukrainian translations, many of which received renewed interest during the 2022 Russian invasion of Ukraine. Its titles have won awards from the Jewish Book Council, the Modern Language Association, AATSEEL, and the Koffler Centre of the Arts, and have also appeared on reading lists published by Mosaic and The Washington Post.

In 2017, ASP was the recipient of funding from the National Endowment for the Humanities to aid in the "creation of freely accessible e-books for 42 seminal titles in Russian literary and cultural history." In the same year, ASP collaborated jointly with the NEH and the Ukrainian Research Institute at Harvard University to publish Words for War, an anthology of contemporary Ukrainian poetry, featuring poems and commentary from figures such as Serhiy Zhadan and Ilya Kaminsky.

In 2018, ASP published the "first authorized English-language translation" of Akram Aylisli's controversial novella Stone Dreams.

== Academic journals and publishing ==
In addition to its books list, the press publishes three peer-reviewed academic journals, including Evolutionary Studies in Imaginative Culture, edited by Joseph Carroll, as well as the Journal of Contemporary Antisemitism, edited since 2018 by Lesley Klaff. Citing her appointment as editor-in-chief of the Journal of Contemporary Antisemitism, the Algemeiner Journal named Klaff among their list of the "top 100 people positively influencing Jewish life" in 2018. In 2020, ASP begin publication of a fourth peer-reviewed journal, Latin American Jewish Studies, on behalf of the Latin American Jewish Studies Association.

Since 2012, ASP has also served as the distributor and printer for books published by Touro College Press. In 2019, ASP entered into an e-book distribution partnership with the German academic publisher Walter de Gruyter.
