= Maurice Samuels =

American historian

Maurice Samuels (born August 9, 1968) is the Betty Jane Anlyan Professor of French at Yale University. He graduated with a BA (summa cum laude) in 1990 from Harvard University, where he also earned his MA (1995) and PhD (2000). Before moving to Yale in 2006, Samuels taught at the University of Pennsylvania. He specializes in the literature and culture of nineteenth-century France and in Jewish Studies, and is the author of books and articles on these and other topics. He is the inaugural director of the Yale Program for the Study of Antisemitism.

== Work ==
Samuels is the author of The Spectacular Past: Popular History and the Novel in Nineteenth-Century France (2004), Inventing the Israelite: Jewish Fiction in Nineteenth-Century France (2010), and The Right to Difference: French Universalism and the Jews (2016). He co-edited and did translations for Nineteenth-Century Jewish Literature Reader (2013). Samuels' book, The Betrayal of the Duchess: The Scandal That Unmade the Bourbon Monarchy and Made France Modern, was published by Basic Books in 2020. His book, Alfred Dreyfus: The Man at the Center of the Affair, was published by Yale University Press in 2024.

In 2011, Samuels became the inaugural director of the Yale Program for the Study of Antisemitism (YPSA), housed at Yale's Whitney Humanities Center. Through a seminar series of invited international scholars, an annual conference, and the awarding of faculty and student research grants, YPSA "promotes the study of the perception of Jews, both positive and negative, in various societies and historical moments, and also encourages comparisons with other forms of discrimination and racism."

== Awards ==
The Spectacular Past won the Gaddis Smith International Book Prize, awarded by Yale University's MacMillan Center. Inventing the Israelite and The Right to Difference both received the Aldo and Jeanne Scaglione Prize for French and Francophone Studies, given by the Modern Language Association. In 2015, Samuels was awarded a fellowship from the John Simon Guggenheim Memorial Foundation.

== Teaching ==
Samuels teaches undergraduate and graduate courses on a variety of topics. Recent courses include "Paris: Capital of the Nineteenth Century"; "Money and the Novel"; "Jewish Identity and French Culture"; "Realism and Naturalism"; "Fin-de-siècle France"; and "Representing the Holocaust." With Alice Kaplan, he teaches a popular undergraduate survey course, The Modern French Novel.
