= Institute for the Study of Global Antisemitism and Policy =

American non-profit organization

Institute For The Study Of Global Anti Semitism And Policy Inc
- Formation: Tax-exempt since April 2005; 21 years ago
- Type: 501(c)(3)
- Tax ID no.: EIN 201381912
- Headquarters: New York City
- Executive Director: Charles A. Small
- Revenue: 3,879,429 USD (2024)
- Expenses: 3,913,475 USD (2024)
- Website: isgap.org

The Institute for the Study of Global Antisemitism and Policy (ISGAP) is an American non-profit organization that produces research, seminars, and conferences to study antisemitism. In recent years, its research has focused specifically on antisemitism on university campuses.

== History ==
ISGAP was founded in 2004 by Charles Asher Small from Tel Aviv University as a non-profit organization to produce and support academic research, seminars, and conferences to study antisemitism. It also works on mapping, decoding, and combating contemporary antisemitism.

In 2006, Small and ISGAP founded the Yale Initiative for the Interdisciplinary Study of Antisemitism (YIISA), the first university-based institute dedicated to the study of antisemitism in North America, at Yale University.

ISGAP expanded into Canada in 2019. The organization's advisors in 2019 included Harvard professors Alan Dershowitz and Ruth Wisse, former Canadian Minister of Justice Irwin Cotler, and historian Irving Abella

In August 2020, ISGAP suspended its operations for 48 hours in solidarity with African Americans during the George Floyd protests.

== Activities ==
ISGAP's flagship program is a two-week conference of more than 80 scholars of antisemitism, approximately 80% of whom are not Jewish. In 2019, the conference was held at Oxford University.

In 2024, ISGAP met regularly with leaders of the Democratic and Republican parties to urge investigations of Gaza war protests at universities. In May 2024, an ISGAP report about Students for Justice in Palestine, alleged that Students for Justice in Palestine was directly connected to the ideology of terrorist groups and the Muslim Brotherhood.

=== Qatari funding of US higher education ===
In November 2023, ISGAP and the Network Contagion Research Institute published a study entitled "'The Corruption of the American Mind" that linked $13 billion in undisclosed foreign funding from Qatar and other countries to over 100 American universities to a 300% increase in antisemitism on campuses. The United States House Committee on Education and Workforce advanced legislation to lower the reporting thresholds for foreign donations to universities.

In June 2024, ISGAP produced reports about funding of campus activities at Columbia and Yale universities, alleging that anti-Zionist faculty had promulgated antisemitic rhetoric and activities on campus. The first report noted that over 100 Columbia faculty members endorsed Students for Justice in Palestine. The report quoted one Columbia professor who described the October 7 attacks as "awesome" and "astounding". The second report alleged that Yale received $15 million from Qatar between 2012 and 2023 while reporting only $284,668. According to ISGAP chair Natan Sharansky, the organization's reports were instrumental in the December 2023 congressional hearings that led Harvard president Claudine Gay to resign.

In 2023, ISGAP published a report alleging Qatari involvement in nuclear research at Texas A&M University’s Qatar campus. A&M President Mark Welsh labeled the claim as “false and irresponsible”. In February 2024, Texas A&M System Board of Regents voted to authorize Welsh to end the contract between A&M and the Qatar Foundation, and to announce the closure of the university’s Qatar campus by 2028. The Qatar faculty member Al-Hishimi called ISGAP’s report baseless and misleading. Small and his firm also demanded an investigation and transparency from the A&M authorities.

=== South Africa ===
In November 2024, ISGAP published a report alleging that the African National Congress was approximately $30 million in debt before bringing its case against Israel; the ANC subsequently received a sudden influx of unidentified cash after a series of meetings with Hamas, Iranian, and Qatari leaders; and ANC leaders refused to disclose the source of the funds, which provided approximately $30 million.

=== Muslim Brotherhood ===
In November 2025 ISGAP claimed that the Muslim Brotherhood is operating by a 100-year plan intended to spread its influence inside Western governments and institutions and that it is connected to Hamas and Qatar.

== Funding ==
In 2019 the ISGAP received a grant of US$1.3 million, to be distributed over three years, from the Israeli government. In 2020, The Forward reported that almost 80% of the ISGAP's funding in 2018, totaling $445,000, had come from the government of Israel, income which the think tank did not divulge.

== See also ==
- Columbia University pro-Palestinian campus protests and occupations during the Gaza war
