= Antisemitism studies =

Academic discipline

Antisemitism studies is an academic discipline centered on the study of antisemitism and anti-Jewish prejudice. Antisemitism studies is interdisciplinary and combines aspects of Jewish studies, social sciences, history, public policy, psychology, and law.

== History ==
=== Early academic study through the Holocaust ===
In the decades after German journalist Wilhelm Marr coined the term "antisemitism" in 1879, antisemitism was a little-studied phenomenon. While antisemitism became a subject of university research and teaching in the early 20th century, social scientists did not develop an exceptional interest in the phenomenon of antisemitism before the Holocaust.

In the 1920s, Swedish historian Hugo Valentin "staked out a new approach to the topic of antisemitism, in which Jewish characteristics and the so-called Jewish question, while not completely absent, were placed within parentheses. Instead, he presented antisemitism and individual antisemites as problems in their own right...."

As persecution of the Jews in Nazi Germany increased and boiled into the Holocaust, scholars began to decode the logic of antisemitism that led to the massive violence against European Jews. Philosophers and social scientists such as Sigmund Freud (1939), Talcott Parsons (1942), Jean Paul Sartre (1945), Ernst Simmel (1946), Max Horkheimer and Theodor W. Adorno (1947) were the main protagonists of this early wave of antisemitism research. While Freud, Sartre, and Simmels focused mainly on psycho-analytical assumptions, Parsons and Horkheimer and Adorno embedded their psychological studies within comprehensive theories of society.

=== Post-Holocaust ===
In the 1960s, the study of antisemitic attitudes in the United States was advanced significantly with the Five-Year Study of Anti-Semitism, also called the "Patterns of American Prejudice" and more commonly known as The Berkeley Studies, commissioned by the Anti-Defamation League (ADL). The Berkeley Studies developed a scale of antisemitic beliefs used by the field well into the 21st century.

Antisemitic attitudes in the U.S. were examined in depth, after the 1980s, when the ADL and the American Jewish Committee (AJC) released a series of competing studies on American antisemitism. The AJC studies positioned attitudes toward Jews within a context of intergroup relationship, while the ADL studies focus on attitudes toward Jews specifically. There were five sets of studies about antisemitism in the 1990s and 2000s: the University of Chicago's National Opinion Research Center (NORC) General Social Survey commissioned by AJC in 1990; 1992, 1998, 2002, and 2009 surveys of American attitudes toward Jews conducted for the ADL, a 1992 intergroup relations study of New York City done by the Roper Organization for AJC, a 1993 ADL survey on racial attitudes in America, and a 1994 study by the NORC confirming and synthesizing the finding of previous studies.

By the 1980s, some universities had established Holocaust research centers around the world, which also served to foster research on antisemitism.

=== 21st century ===
The study of antisemitism reemerged in the early 21st century, focusing on the concept of New Antisemitism, fueled by an increase in antisemitic activity in Europe and Israelophobia. In 2009, Steven K. Baum and Neal E. Rosenberg founded the Journal for the Study of Antisemitism as the first English-language academic journal solely devoted to the study of antisemitism. According to scholar Kenneth Marcus, antisemitism was not considered a particularly popular or politically correct area of academic focus, particularly on the political left, because so much of contemporary antisemitism arises from Arab and Muslim countries. The first journal's issue was released in June 2009 with Professor Michael Berenbaum as founding editor.

In Europe, the number of research items dealing with antisemitism more than doubled between the 1990s and 2010s, with antisemitism taking up an increasingly large proportion of research holdings since 1990. The European Union Strategy on Combatting Antisemitism and Fostering Jewish Life, published on 5 October 2021, recommended the formation of a European research hub to coordinate academic research on antisemitism and Jewish life across Europe and foster and fund multidisciplinary research. A 2023 study by the European Commission noted that the core group of academic researchers of antisemitism numbered approximately 60; however, antisemitism was not the primary focus of study for the majority.

In 2009, Birkbeck, University of London and the Pears Foundation launched the Pears Institute for the Study of Antisemitism, the first academic institute in Britain solely studying antisemitism.

In the aftermath of the 2023 Hamas-led attack on Israel and subsequent rise in global antisemitism, several universities announced the formation of academic research institutes and programs specifically focusing on antisemitism, including the University of Michigan, New York University and the University of Toronto (U of T). The Lab for the Study of Global Antisemitism at U of T was the first antisemitism research institute in Canada. Gratz College debuted a master's degree in antisemitism studies in February 2024, the first-of-its-kind interdisciplinary graduate program in the United States.

Studies on antisemitism and the internet include investigations into distortions of the Holocaust on Wikipedia.

== Interdisciplinary study ==
Besides extensive historical research, there has been in-depth research on antisemitism in psychology. The sociology of antisemitism can be traced back to Jewish scholars of early sociology, including Franz Boas, Arthur Ruppin, Georg Simmel, and includes Talcott Parsons 1942 pioneering article, "The Sociology of Modern Anti-Semitism," and other studies in the post-War era.

== Research institutes ==
=== United States ===
==== New York University ====
In November 2023, New York University announced The Center for the Study of Antisemitism to open in the fall of 2024. The center would convene scholars from a range of academic disciplines, including social sciences, Judaic studies, history, social work, public policy, psychology, and law, and would produce research on both "classicial" antisemitism and New Antisemitism and its links to anti-Zionism. The center would work closely with NYU's Skirball Department of Hebrew and Judaic Studies. Scholar Avinoam Patt was named as the center's first director.

=== University of Michigan ===
Amidst a rise of antisemitism after the 2023 Hamas attack on Israel, the University of Michigan established the Raoul Wallenberg Institute in December 2023. The center, named for Raoul Wallenberg, would use research and scholarship on antisemitism to combat the phenomenon. The institute is housed within the university's College of Literature, Science and the Arts.

=== University of Pennsylvania ===
The University of Pennsylvania established the Fund for the Study of Antisemitism within the Herbert D. Katz Center for Advanced Judaic Studies in October 2023. The fund would support research and advance public understanding, according to scholar Steven Weitzman.

=== Canada ===
==== University of Toronto ====
After the 2023 Hamas-led attack on Israel, Anna Shternshis, director of the Anne Tanenbaum Centre for Jewish Studies, and Ron Levi, Distinguished Professor of Global Justice at the Munk School of Global Affairs and Public Policy, launched the Lab for the Study of Global Antisemitism at the University of Toronto in February 2024. The lab's focuses are to conduct high-level academic research, designing academic courses about antisemitism, and policy and communications. The lab was the first antisemitism research institute in Canada.

=== Germany ===
The Center for Research on Antisemitism (Zentrum für Antisemitismusforschung, ZfA) at Technische Universität Berlin is a research centre dedicated to researching antisemitism. It was founded in 1982.

=== United Kingdom ===
==== Birkbeck, University of London ====
Pears Institute for the Study of Antisemitism, the first academic institute in Britain solely studying antisemitism, was established in November 2009 at Birkbeck, University of London with support from the Pears Foundation. Professor David Feldman was named as the institute's first director in April 2010.

== Academic journals ==
=== Journal for the Study of Antisemitism ===
In 2009, Steven K. Baum and Neal E. Rosenberg founded the Journal for the Study of Antisemitism as the first English-language academic journal solely devoted to the study of antisemitism. The first issue was released in June 2009 with Professor Michael Berenbaum as founding editor.

=== Journal of Contemporary Antisemitism ===
The Journal of Contemporary Antisemitism (JCA) is a biannual peer-reviewed journal founded in 2017.

== See also ==
- Universities and antisemitism
- Jewish studies
- Holocaust studies
- Normalization of antisemitism
