= Steven K. Baum =

American scholar

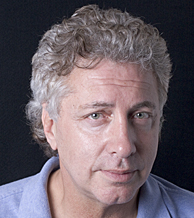
- Baum in 2005
- Born: December 4, 1953 (age 71)
- Occupation: Gerontologist and clinical psychologist
- Subject: Antisemitism

Website
- www.stevebaum.com

Steven K. Baum is a scholar on genocide and antisemitism. He is a co-founder and the chief editor of the Journal for the Study of Antisemitism. He practices psychology in Albuquerque, New Mexico.

== Books and journals ==
- The Psychology of Genocide (Cambridge University Press 2008), ISBN 9780521713924
- Antisemitism Explained (UPA 2012), ISBN 9780761855781
- Antisemitism in North America: New World, Old Hate (Brill 2016), ISBN 9789004307148
- Chief editor, Journal for the Study of Antisemitism
