= Raphael Israeli =

Israeli historian and writer (born 1935)

- רפאל ישראלי
- Born: 15 September 1935 (age 90); Fes, Morocco
- Education: Hebrew University of Jerusalem; University of California at Berkeley PhD
- Occupations: Professor emeritus Historian

Raphael Israeli (Hebrew: רפאל ישראלי; born September 15, 1935) is an Israeli historian and writer. He is a professor emeritus of Middle Eastern, Islamic and Chinese history at the Hebrew University of Jerusalem, as well as a research fellow at the Truman Institute for the Advancement of Peace and the Jerusalem Center for Public Affairs.

== Biography ==
Israeli was born in Fes, Morocco and emigrated to the new state of Israel at the age of fourteen. For twelve years he was a career officer in the Israeli Defence Force in Military Intelligence, whereafter he switched to Academia.

He received a degree in Arabic and History from the Hebrew University of Jerusalem and then studied at the University of California at Berkeley, where he earned a Ph.D in Chinese and Islamic History. He has taught for 30 years at the Hebrew University and was a visiting professor at universities in the United States, Canada, Australia, Japan, and Europe. He is the author of over 50 research books and some 100 scholarly articles on the Modern Middle East, Islamic radicalism, Islam in China, Asia and Europe.

In 2017, Israeli published a book in Hebrew titled The Arab Minority in Israel, Open and Hidden Processes, in which he calls the Arab minority a "fifth column", who receive more from the state than they contribute and expresses regret that they are not confined to camps like Japanese Americans were in WWII. The Anti-Defamation League called the book "hateful rhetoric".

For his 2008 book The Spread of Islamikaze Terrorism in Europe: The Third Islamic Invasion, Israeli said that Europe is in danger of becoming "Eurabia" within half a century. Israeli has been described as a proponent of the counter-jihadist worldview of Bat Ye'or.

== Publications ==
- Jerusalem Divided: the Armistice Regime, 1947–1967, Frank Cass, 2002. ISBN 9780714682419
- Poison: Manifestations of a Blood Libel, Lexington Books, 2002. ISBN 9780739102084
- Green Crescent over Nazareth: the Displacement of Christians by Muslims in the Holy Land, Frank Cass, 2002. ISBN 9780714652580
- Islam in China: Religion, Ethnicity, Culture and Politics, Rowman and Littlefield (Lexington Books), Maryland, 2002. ISBN 9780739156612
- Dangers of a Palestinian State (ed.), Geffen, Jerusalem, 2002. ISBN 9789652293039
- War, Peace and Terror in the Middle East, Psychology Press, 2003. ISBN 9780714655314
- Islamikaze: Manifestations of Islamic Martyrology, Frank Cass, London, 2004. ISBN 9781135759025
- The Iraq War: Hidden Agendas and Babylonian Intrigue, Sussex Academic Press, 2004. ISBN 9781837642427
- Living with Islam: the Sources of Fundamentalist Islam (Hebrew), Achiasaf, 2006.
- Arabs in Israel: Friends or Foes? (Hebrew and English), Ariel Books, 2008. ISBN 9789657165782
- The Spread of Islamikaze Terrorism in Europe: The Third Islamic Invasion, Vallentine Mitchell, London, 2008. ISBN 9780853037347
- Islamic Radicalism and Political Violence: The Templars of Islam and Sheikh Ra’id Salah, Vallentine Mitchell, London, 2008. ISBN 9780853037293
- Palestinians Between Nationalism and Islam : a Collection of Essays, Vallentine Mitchell, London, 2008. ISBN 9780853037316
- Piracy in Qumran: The Battle over the Scrolls of the Pre-Christ Era, Transaction, Rutgers University Press, New Jersey, 2008. ISBN 9781412807036
- The Islamic Challenge in Europe, Transaction, Rutgers University Press, 2008. ISBN 9781412807500
- Muslim Minorities in the Modern State, Transaction, Rutgers University Press, 2009. ISBN 9781412808750
- Muslim anti-Semitism in Christian Lands, Transaction, 2009.
- Back to Nowhere, Moroccan Jews in Fantasy and Reality, Lambert, Germany, 2010 (also in Hebrew in Jerusalem).
- Dabry : The Opening of China by the French, Lambert, Germany, 2011.
- The Blood Libel and its Derivatives, Transaction, 2012. ISBN 9781412846790
- The Oslo Idea: The Euphoria of Failure, Transaction, 2012. ISBN 9781412846110
- Israel's New Strategic Dilemmas, Strategic Book Publishing & Rights Co. in Texas, 2012. ISBN 9781618971807
- Death Camps in Croatia: Visions and Revisions, Transaction, 2013. ISBN 9781412849302
- From Arab Spring to Islamic Winter: Roots and Consequences, Transaction, 2013. ISBN 9781412852593
- Savagery in the Heart of Europe: the Bosnia War (1992–1995), Strategic Book Publishing & Rights Co., Texas, 2013. (Raphael Israeli and Albert Benabou) ISBN 9781628570151
- Hatred, Lies and Violence in the Islamic World, Transaction, NJ, 2014. ISBN 9781412854481
- Defeat, Trauma, Lesson: Israel Between Life and Extinction, Strategic Book Publishing & Rights Co., TX, 2014. ISBN 9781631350139
- Years of Upheaval: The Axial Years in Islam since 1989, Transaction, NJ, 2017 ISBN 9781351470865
- The Internationalization of ISIS: The Muslim State in Iraq and Syria, Transaction Publishers, April 2016, 287 pages.
