= Charles A. Small =

Canadian intellectual

Charles Asher Small is a Canadian intellectual who is the founder and director of the Institute for the Study of Global Antisemitism and Policy the first international interdisciplinary research center dedicated to studying antisemitism with a contemporary focus.

== Biography ==
Small is the founding director and president of the Institute for the Study of Global Antisemitism and Policy. He is also a research scholar at St. Antony's College, Oxford, and a senior research fellow at the Moshe Dayan Centre for the Middle East and African Studies, and the Hartog School of Government and Policy, Tel Aviv University. Small received a Bachelor of Arts in political science from McGill University, an M.Sc. in urban development planning in economics from the University College London, and a Doctorate of Philosophy (D.Phil.) from Oxford University. Small completed post-doctorate research at the Groupement de recherche ethnicité et société, Université de Montréal. He was the VATAT Research Fellow of the Ministry of Higher Education, at Ben Gurion University, Beersheva, and taught in departments of sociology and geography at Goldsmiths' College, University of London; Tel Aviv University; and the Institute of Urban Studies, Hebrew University, Jerusalem.

Small is the author of books and articles including the six volume "Global Antisemitism: A Crisis of Modernity"; "the Yale Papers: Antisemitism in Comparative Perspective"; and "Social Theory – a Historical Analysis of Canadian Socio-cultural Policies Race and the Other", Eleven International Publishers; and The Yale Papers: Antisemitism in Comparative Perspective. Small is committed to creating scholarly programming and research on contemporary antisemitism at top-tier universities internationally and establishing contemporary antisemitism studies as a recognized academic discipline.

Born in Montreal, Quebec, Canada, he has a D.Phil. from Oxford University, and has taught at the University of London, Ben Gurion University, Tel Aviv University, and Hebrew University. Small was also the Koret Distinguished Scholar, Hoover Institution, Stanford University. He was the Director/Associate Professor of Urban Studies at Southern Connecticut State University. Small has been a visiting professor at University College London; McGill University, Montreal; the University of Vilnius, Lithuania, and Cape Town University, South Africa. He also spoke as an expert on anti-Semitism at the Australian, British, Canadian, Chilean, and Italian Parliaments, the German Bundestag, and at the United Nations, Geneva, and New York.

On September 19, 2006, Yale University founded The Yale Initiative for the Interdisciplinary Study of Antisemitism (YIISA), the first North American university-based center for the study of the subject, housed at the Institute for Social and Policy Studies, with Small as director and founder. He cited the increase in anti-Semitism worldwide in recent years as generating a "need to understand the current manifestation of this disease".

In August 2010 in New Haven, Small was elected as the President of the newly formed International Association for the Study of Antisemitism (IASA).

In June 2011, Yale shut down YIISA, with commentators arguing that YIISA was politicized and struggled to establish academic rigor.

== Books ==
- The ISGAP Papers: Antisemitism in Comparative Perspective, 2018, ISGAP, New York
- The ISGAP Papers: Antisemitism in Comparative Perspective, 2016, ISGAP, New York
- The Yale Papers: Antisemitism in Comparative Perspective, 2015, ISGAP, New York
- Global Antisemitism: A Crisis of Modernity An Introduction, 2014, New York
- Global Antisemitism: A Crisis of Modernity, ISGAP Publishers, 2013 VI Volume, New York.
- Global Antisemitism: A Crisis of Modernity, Brill Press, Amsterdam, 2013.
- Social Theory - a Historical Analysis of Canadian Socio-Cultural Policies, 'Race' and The 'Other': A Case Study of Social and Spatial Segregation in Montreal, Eleven International Publishing, Amsterdam, 2013.
- Charles Asher Small, Olufemi Vaughan, and M. Wright; Globalization and Marginalization: Essays on the Paradoxes of Global, Ibadan, Nigeria: Sefer Academic Press, 2005.
- "Global Antisemitism: Assault on Human Rights"

=== Books (selection) ===
- Small, C. in eds. with Ostendorf Wim and Schnell Izhak "National Identity in a Transforming Quebec Society: Socio-Economic and Spatial Segregation in Montreal", Studies in Segregation and De-Segregation, Avebury, London, 2001.
- "Nationalism and Difference in a Cosmopolitan City: The Case of Montreal". Geography Research Forum, Vol. 20, pages 70–101, Beer-Sheva, Israel, 2000
- "Social and Spatial Differentiation in Montreal: Assessing a Changing Society", Journal of Research (Paper Number 57, August), School of Geography, Oxford, 2000.
- "Cosmopolitan Planning: A Model for Reconciliation in Jerusalem", Cantilevers, Vol 4, No 21, 1999.
- "Montreal, Nationalism and a Divided City", Jewish Chronicle, London, November 1996.
- A Report on English University Programmes: Concerning Issues of 'Race' and 'Ethnic' Relations; Canadian Ethnic Studies, Secretariat of State, Ottawa, 1995.
