= Journal for the Study of Antisemitism =

Academic journal

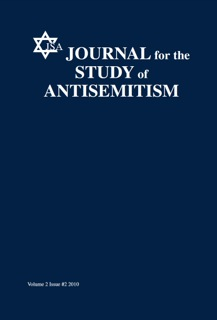
- Language: English
- Edited by: Steven K. Baum

Publication details
- History: 2009-present
- Frequency: Biannually

Standard abbreviations
- ISO 4: J. Study Antisemitism

Links
- Journal homepage

The Journal for the Study of Antisemitism is a biannual peer-reviewed academic journal published in the United States on the anthropological, sociological, psychological, legal, historical, philosophical, and political aspects of contemporary antisemitism.

== History and format ==
The journal was established in 2009. Its founding editors were Steven K. Baum and Neil E. Rosenberg. An issue of the journal typically features five or six major articles, several essays and reviews. The inaugural issue of the journal edited by Michael Berenbaum was mired in politics when an article critical of the Berlin Centre for Antisemitism Research led to the temporary dismissal of editorial board member Clemens Heni. Several other board members resigned but returned when Heni was reinstated.

== See also ==
- Journal of Contemporary Antisemitism
