= Center for Research on Antisemitism =

German research centre

The Center for Research on Antisemitism (Zentrum für Antisemitismusforschung, ZfA) at Technische Universität Berlin is a research centre dedicated to researching antisemitism. It was founded in 1982. Historian Wolfgang Benz headed the institute from 1990 to 2011.

== History ==
Historian Moshe Zimmermann considers Heinz Galinski, president of the Central Council of Jews in Germany, and Rolf Berger, president of Technische Universität Berlin as the founding fathers of the center. According to Zimmerman, Galinski saw the 40th anniversary of the Kristallnacht pogrom in 1978 and the gap in the systematic study of antisemitism as the ideal time to launch an academic research center. Berger approached Mayor of West Berlin Dietrich Stobbe, who was keen to support as a sign of solidarity with the Jewish community in Germany.

After an initial faculty meeting in November 1978, the university struggled to establish the center. The Center for Research on Antisemitism (ZfA) was officially established in 1982. Founding director Herbert A. Strauss gave his inaugural address on November 9, 1982, called "Research on Antisemitism as a Science". According to Zimmerman, Strauss followed the socio-historical methods of prejudice research in the United States and Great Britain, which emphasized the uniqueness of antisemitism.

Under Strauss's successor Wolfgang Benz, who took over in 1990, ZfA was part of the public debate about to what extent antisemitism should be researched within the context of research into general prejudice. Under Benz, the center became the first Holocaust research center in Germany.

Stefanie Schüler-Springorum has been the center's director since 2011.
