= Reactions to the 2010 Gaza flotilla raid =

Reactions to the Gaza flotilla raid on 31 May 2010 ranged from fierce condemnation to strong support for Israel.

Israel expressed regret over loss of life in the Gaza flotilla raid, yet stated that the operation was a "clear case of self defense". Prime Minister Benjamin Netanyahu apologised for the incident in March 2013, which he said was necessitated by the Syrian civil war. The incident also drew attention to the blockade of the Gaza Strip, which was condemned. Secretary-General of the United Nations Ban Ki-moon called for a full investigation and urged Israel to provide a full explanation. Many countries called for an international investigation and civilian protests erupted around the world. Four countries downgraded their diplomatic relations with Israel and/or withdrew ambassadors: Ecuador, Nicaragua, South Africa, and Turkey. Twelve Latin American countries condemned Israeli actions: Argentina, Bolivia, Brazil, Chile, Cuba, Ecuador, Mexico, Nicaragua, Paraguay, Peru, Uruguay and Venezuela. Israel had developed significant bilateral relationships with seven of them. Twenty-three European countries condemned or protested Israeli actions: Albania, Azerbaijan, Belarus, Bosnia and Herzegovina, Bulgaria, Croatia, the Czech Republic, Estonia, Finland, France, Greece, Iceland, Ireland, Italy, Luxembourg, Norway, Portugal, Romania, Russia, Serbia, Spain, Sweden and the United Kingdom. Israel was widely condemned in the Arab world. Thirteen non-Arab Asian countries condemned Israeli actions: Brunei, China, India, Indonesia, Iran, Japan, Malaysia, Maldives, North Korea, Pakistan, Sri Lanka, Turkey and Uzbekistan. Israel was also condemned by: Australia, Kenya, New Zealand and South Africa. Eighteen countries expressed regret over the loss of life: Israel, Argentina, Azerbaijan, Bangladesh, Canada, Czech Republic, Croatia, Egypt, Estonia, Greece, Holy See, India, Ireland, Japan, Sri Lanka, the United Kingdom, the United States and Uruguay. Unofficial responses included civilian protests against Israeli action following reports of the deaths aboard the MV Mavi Marmara.

The Turkish government and the İHH were also criticised. Several journalists accused Turkey of aligning itself with Iran, Syria, Hamas and Hezbollah, and expressed concern over the contribution of Recep Tayyip Erdoğan and his government to fueling public rage. Pro-Israeli rallies took place in Los Angeles, Miami, Vienna, Great Britain, Brussels and Israel.

== Supranational organizations ==
=== United Nations ===
- The Secretary-General of the United Nations, Ban Ki-moon condemned the violence, called for "a full investigation to determine exactly how this bloodshed took place" and urged Israel to "provide a full explanation [into the matter]". He also said that the underlying problem behind the raid was the siege of Gaza, which he described as "counter-productive, unsustainable and wrong". On 2 August he announced that a U.N. panel was to investigate (see 2010 Gaza flotilla raid § Investigations).
- United Nations High Commissioner for Human Rights Navanethem Pillay said "I am also registering my shock at reports that humanitarian aid was met with violence early this morning, reportedly causing death and injury as the convoy approached the Gaza coast."
- The UN Special Coordinator for the Middle East Peace Process, Robert Serry, and the director of the United Nations Relief and Works Agency for Palestine Refugees in the Near East, Filippo Grandi declared "these tragedies are completely inevitable if Israel does not listen to the callings of the international community to end the unacceptable and counter-productive blockade of Gaza."
- The Relief and Works Agency also said "we are shocked by reports of killings and injuries of people on board boats carrying supplies for Gaza, apparently in international waters. Such tragedies are entirely avoidable if Israel heeds the repeated calls of the international community to end its counterproductive and unacceptable blockade of Gaza.

=== Others ===
African Union (See below).

Arab League (See below).

Association of Southeast Asian Nations condemned the Israeli attack, called on Israel to lift its blockade of Gaza, expressed solidarity with Turkey, and urged the UN to conduct an investigation.

European Union (See below).

NATO held an emergency meeting on 1 June 2010 in response to the attack. Turkey is a NATO signatory, and Article 5 of the NATO charter states that armed attacks against one or more NATO members in Europe or North America will be considered an attack against all of them, and each will take action (including the possibility of armed force) "to restore and maintain the security of the North Atlantic area". Article 6 explicitly mentions the Mediterranean Sea as a location for where attacks will trigger responses. The result of the meeting was that the NATO Secretary General issued a statement expressing "deep regret" over the loss of lives and "As a matter of urgency, [he] also request[ed] the immediate release of the detained civilians and ships held by Israel."

Organization of American States (See below).

Organisation of Islamic Cooperation Secretary General Ekmeleddin İhsanoğlu condemned Israel for the attack on the people on the ship.

The Southeast European Cooperation Process, at a meeting of the 13 member countries in June 2010, condemned Israel's raid and demanded an impartial, independent and internationally credible investigation.

International Committee of the Red Cross said that Israel's blockade violated the Geneva Conventions and stated that it constituted a collective punishment imposed in clear violation of Israel's obligations under international humanitarian law.

== Non-governmental organizations ==
=== International human rights and advocacy organizations ===
- Amnesty International accused Israel of using excessive force, and claimed that the level of lethal force used was out of proportion to any threat that could have been posed by the activists. Amnesty International called on Israel to make public the rules of engagement used by the commandos, and to launch an "immediate, credible and independent investigation". Amnesty International also called for an international inquiry, and called on Israel to invite UN experts to examine the incident.
- The Foreign Press Association, which represents hundreds of journalists in Israel and the Palestinian territories, has complained the Israeli military seized video and equipment from dozens of reporters on board the main ship. The FPA says the military is now selectively using footage to bolster its claims that commandos opened fire only after being attacked. FPA also criticized Israel's use of captured material without permission.
- Human Rights Watch called for a "full, impartial investigation" into the incident, and for the international community to make sure that any inquiries meet basic international standards, and that any wrongdoers were brought to justice. Human Rights Watch also called on Israel to grant all detained and injured flotilla members immediate access to legal counsel and their families, and to disclose the identities of all those injured and killed.
- Reporters Without Borders called for the release of the names of all journalists held after the raid. They said there were at least 15 foreign journalists in the convoy. A statement said "We deplore this assault, which left a heavy toll of dead and wounded. The journalists who were on the flotilla to cover the humanitarian operation were put in harm's way by this disproportionate reaction. We urge the Israeli authorities to release the detained journalists and allow them unrestricted access to the Gaza Strip. The international community needs accurate information about this Palestinian Territory.
- Stop the War Coalition issued a statement saying "The action should see Israel condemned under international law. Israel has repeatedly flouted law and public opinion worldwide in its treatment of the Palestinians. The decision by Israel to attack the flotilla with such loss of human life shows it is arrogant and deadly intent in opposing any aid to the Palestinians."
- The President of the Algerian MSP Bouguerra Soltani, whose wife is part of the delegation, announced the dispatch of a parliamentary delegation to Turkey to try to get information about the 32 Algerians aboard the convoy. In an interview with Al-Aqsa TV, Imam Ahmad Ibrahimi, the Coordinator of Algerian Delegation to Flotilla, stated (as translated by MEMRI), "we felt no fear whatsoever of those brothers of apes and pigs. By Allah, I loathed them before, and my hatred of them has only grown, not because they punished and humiliated us, but because I had thought them to be worthy enemies, but it turns out that they are too despicable even to be called our enemies, because they are not our equals. They are cowards ... Our hatred for these people is so intense that we wished, at those moments, that we could have been bombs, and blow up among those brothers of apes and pigs."

=== Israeli and Jewish organizations ===
The Australian Jewish Democratic Society said, "Unless the Israeli government can convincingly back up its claims that the Gaza aid convoy was not a project for delivering humanitarian aid to Gaza, but in reality a front for violent action, it invites the condemnation of everyone who supports negotiated conflict resolution and reinforces the view that Israel's professed support for human rights is a sham."

B'Tselem demanded that an independent and effective investigation conducted by non-military officials be launched immediately. B'Tselem stated that among the issues that needed investigating are whether proportionate force was used, whether the soldiers were trained and equipped to cope with this type of event, what open-fire regulations were given to soldiers, and whether alternative options were considered.

Jews for Justice for Palestinians said, "Jews For Justice For Palestinians (the largest alternative voice of Jews in the UK or Europe) utterly condemns Israel's aggressive military interception of the peaceful Free Gaza aid flotilla. We hold Israel responsible for the tragic deaths and injuries which this action caused."

German Jewish group Jewish Voices for a Just Peace decided to send a boat with school supplies and humanitarian aid to break the Gaza blockade. Kate Katzenstein-Leiterer, a leader of the group, said instead that they wanted to help preserve the State of Israel by showing that its current policies were wrong. Due to excessive interest, the group subsequently decided to arrange a second vessel.

Rabbi Dovid Feldman of Neturei Karta said: "Authentic Orthodox Jewry worldwide decries unequivocally the cold-blooded slaughter carried out by the Zionist occupational forces against innocent, peaceful and freedom-loving noble activists committed to peace and human rights. This brutal attack took place in international waters on ships bearing humanitarian aid for our brethren, the Palestinian residents in the besieged Gaza Strip. It was an explicitly illegal act which breaches, in a serious manner, basic G-dly human rights, justice and law. This kind of behavior is, unfortunately, only to be expected from the Zionists. Their state's entire existence was built from the very start on Heresy, robbery and murder. They oppressed, murdered and expelled an entire people from its land." Adding, "We find it imperative to clearly declare that the State of 'Israel' does not represent the Jewish people, and certainly not the Jewish religion. They have no right to speak in our name, nor in the name of the holy Torah. They profane the Holy Land with their abominations, slaughters and countless other actions that emanate from this illegitimate State. Furthermore, the actual existence of this State is illegitimate as the holy Torah strictly and explicitly forbids any Jewish rule over the Holy Land." Neturei Karta protests took place in Ottawa, Montreal, Washington, D.C., New York City, Jerusalem and London. Neturei Karta Rabbis visited the injured in Turkey.

=== Commercial organisations ===
- The International Chamber of Shipping (ICS), an association that represents 75 percent of the world's merchant fleet, has expressed "deep concern" over the boarding by Israeli forces in international waters. "The fundamental principles of international law, safe passage and freedom of navigation in international waters, must always be upheld by all of the world's nations," the organization said.

=== Religious leaders ===
- Imam Fethullah Gülen, a U.S.-based Turkish cleric, criticized the flotilla for trying to deliver aid without Israel's consent. He said the organizers' failure to seek accord with Israel before attempting to deliver aid "is a sign of defying authority, and will not lead to fruitful matters.... What I saw was not pretty. It was ugly."
- David Hatchwell Altaras, vice president of the 10,000 member Jewish community in Madrid, criticized the Spanish government's "knee-jerk" reaction to slam Israel's seizure of the Gaza flotilla. He added that the Spanish government "should be more even-handed and take more distance ... the IHH activists attacked Israeli forces in order to have a specific outcome."

== Public opinion and political activism ==
=== Critical ===
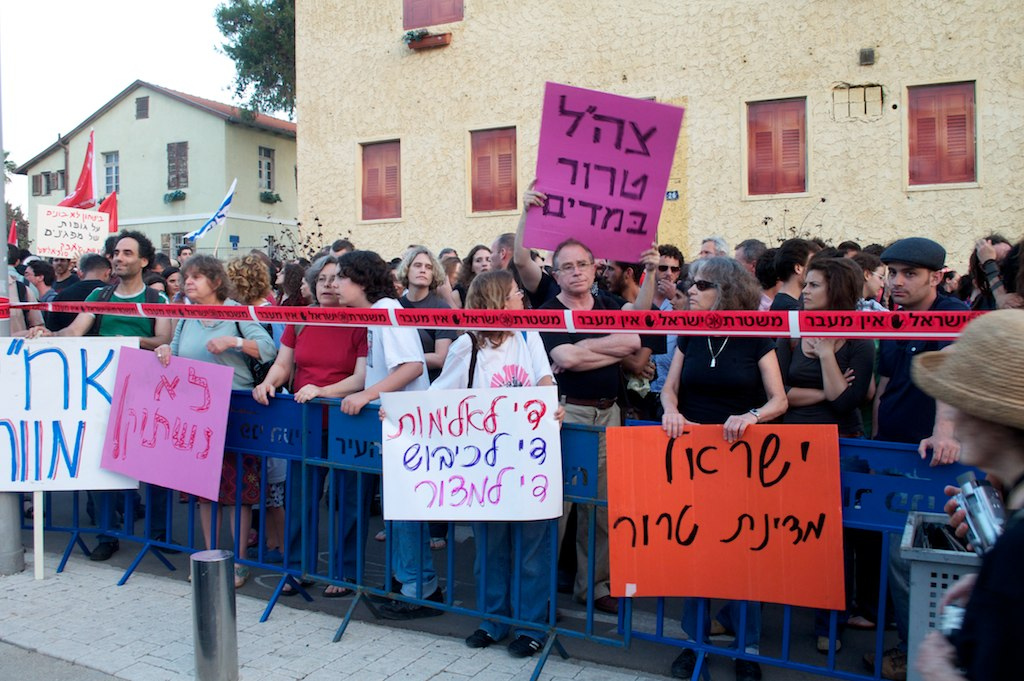
One of the earliest Israeli demonstrations (31 May 2010). Demonstrators in front of Israeli Defence Ministry protest against IDF actions toward "Flotilla". Signs read in Hebrew "IDF-terror in uniform" and "Israel-state of terror".

Throughout 31 May, demonstrators gathered in the Middle East, Europe, North America and South Asia following the attack.

In Turkey, more than ten thousand people gathered to protest in Taksim Square in central Istanbul on the night of 31 May 2010. Hundreds of protesters then tried to storm the Israeli consulate in Istanbul. A second day of protests took place across Turkey; protestors marched in front of Istanbul's Israeli consulate, and several people were arrested in Ankara after encountering police in front of the Israeli Embassy there. On 1 June, Azerbaijani protesters gathered outside the Turkish embassy in Baku to condemn the Israeli attack. The protesters were carrying the Azerbaijani and Turkish flags. They also carried placards saying "Israel is a barbarian" and "Israel is a murderer," and chanted slogans such as "Azerbaijan and Turkey: one nation, two states", "Turkey's grief is Azerbaijan's grief" and "Down with Israel". The protesters stated their support for the Turkish government and people.

In Tel Aviv, leftist and rightist demonstrators clashed on 5 June 2010, as more than 6,000 citizens gathered to protest the Israeli raid against the aid convoy.

During a demonstration at a checkpoint between Israel and the West Bank, which involved stone-throwing by Palestinian youths, Israeli soldiers fired tear gas canisters at demonstrators. An art student from New York, who according to a witness was not involved in any violence, lost an eye when one of the canisters fractured parts of her skull.

In the Arab world, thousands marched in condemnation on the streets of Baghdad. Thousands of Egyptians also rallied to request that Cairo's Israeli ambassador be expelled and that the government open the Gaza border. There were also demonstrations in Damascus, Amman, and Beirut. While Palestinians in the West Bank clashed with Israeli security forces who responded with tear gas. Several hundred Arab protestors in Israel were arrested in Umm al-Fahm as the demonstrations turned violent. Protests were also held in the Arab cities of Acre, Sakhnin, Arraba and Shfaram, although there was no violence reported. A spontaneous demonstration also took place in Nazareth as Israeli security forces prepared to face an anticipated wave of violence. Demonstration were also held in Sana'a.

On 1 June 2010, in Malaysia, a man performed a personal protest before the United States embassy at Jalan Tun Razak when he "slashed himself with a penknife on the thighs and chest" to express his disapproval of the Israeli attack. He was bundled away to a hospital before the knife reached his neck. Protests were held across Pakistan by journalists, political parties, and college students. The Lahore Press Club called for the release of all detained persons, and called the raid an "act of terrorism". They accused Israel of violating international law, and demanded an urgent explanation of the matter. They also demanded the Pakistani government to secure the release of the Pakistanis arrested. Protests were also held in Jakarta and other cities across Indonesia. Demonstrations were being organised in New Delhi and other Indian cities to condemn the action.

In Greece, thousands of protesters marched on the Israeli Embassy in Athens, sparking clashes with police, the deployment of tear gas, five arrests and many injuries. Tear gas was also used in Paris to disperse the thousands of people who waved Palestinian and Turkish flags beside the Israeli Embassy. Twenty-one cities in Sweden, including Gothenburg and Malmö, held demonstrations, with thousands of protesters clutching Palestinian flags as they marched on the Israeli Embassy in Stockholm, while speakers expressed their "disgust and dismay". In Norway, approximately 2,000 demonstrators gathered peacefully in front of the Israeli Embassy in Oslo, while chanting slogans and calling for a "boycott of Israel" and closure of the Israeli Embassy. In Italy, there were protests in many cities, including Rome, where one speaker said the situation was "extremely serious and has no precedent whatsoever in the history of international diplomacy". In the United Kingdom, over a thousand protesters rallied outside Downing Street and barricaded Whitehall on 31 May. In Manchester 800 protesters attempted to storm the BBC offices in reaction to a perceived bias in the BBC's reporting of the incident. There were further protests in Preston and Bolton. Readers of the Irish Times sent angry letters to the newspaper on 1 June. Protests took place across Ireland on 31 May, including Belfast, Cork, Derry, Galway, Sligo and Waterford, while hundreds of protesters in Dublin marched from the Israeli embassy to the nearby US Embassy before returning to the Israeli embassy. Those present at the Dublin protest included Aengus Ó Snodaigh and Chris Andrews, both of whom Cypriot authorities had prevented from joining the flotilla, as well as Lord Mayor of Dublin Emer Costello. Palestinians supporters of both Hamas and Fatah were part of the protests, with chants mostly in Arabic.

During 1–5 June, thousands of people rallied throughout various cities across the United States and Canada to protest the flotilla raid and the subsequent seizure of the MV Rachel Corrie and its crew, including Chicago, San Francisco, Los Angeles, Minneapolis, Minnesota, Toronto, Ottawa, Montreal and Vancouver. In New York City, protesters marched from Times Square toward the Israeli Mission to the United Nations in response to the Israeli attack. Similar scenes were seen in Australia, where thousands gathered across the country to protest against the Israeli raid and the ongoing blockade of Gaza.

On 4 June, there were protests in Ireland and Malaysia. The Israeli embassy in Dublin was blockaded by dozens of people, causing its closure for the day but authorities deemed it a peaceful protest and no arrests were made. Opposition leader Anwar Ibrahim was among protesters who gathered outside the US embassy along Jalan Tun Razak in Kuala Lumpur, disrupting traffic for several hours. On 5 June further demonstrations were organised in the United Kingdom, with the Scottish Palestine Solidarity Campaign leading a three-thousand strong march in Edinburgh. In London thousands marched from Downing Street to the Israeli embassy to express their outrage at Israeli actions.

On 7 June 2010, approximately 200 mostly Muslim students threw stones at a group of Israelis while chanting "Murderers", and subsequently broke the window of the police car that they took refuge in. One of the Israelis was injured. The incident occurred at the start of the Spain-Israel Chamber of Commerce's conference at Madrid's Autonomous University. Following the violence, the university called off the conference due to safety concerns. According to Spanish media, the organizers had changed the conference's venue at the last minute due to concerns about potential violence but the protestors discovered the new location and stormed in while chanting, "Murderers, murderers. Get out of Gaza" and "Freedom to the Palestinian people".

=== Support ===
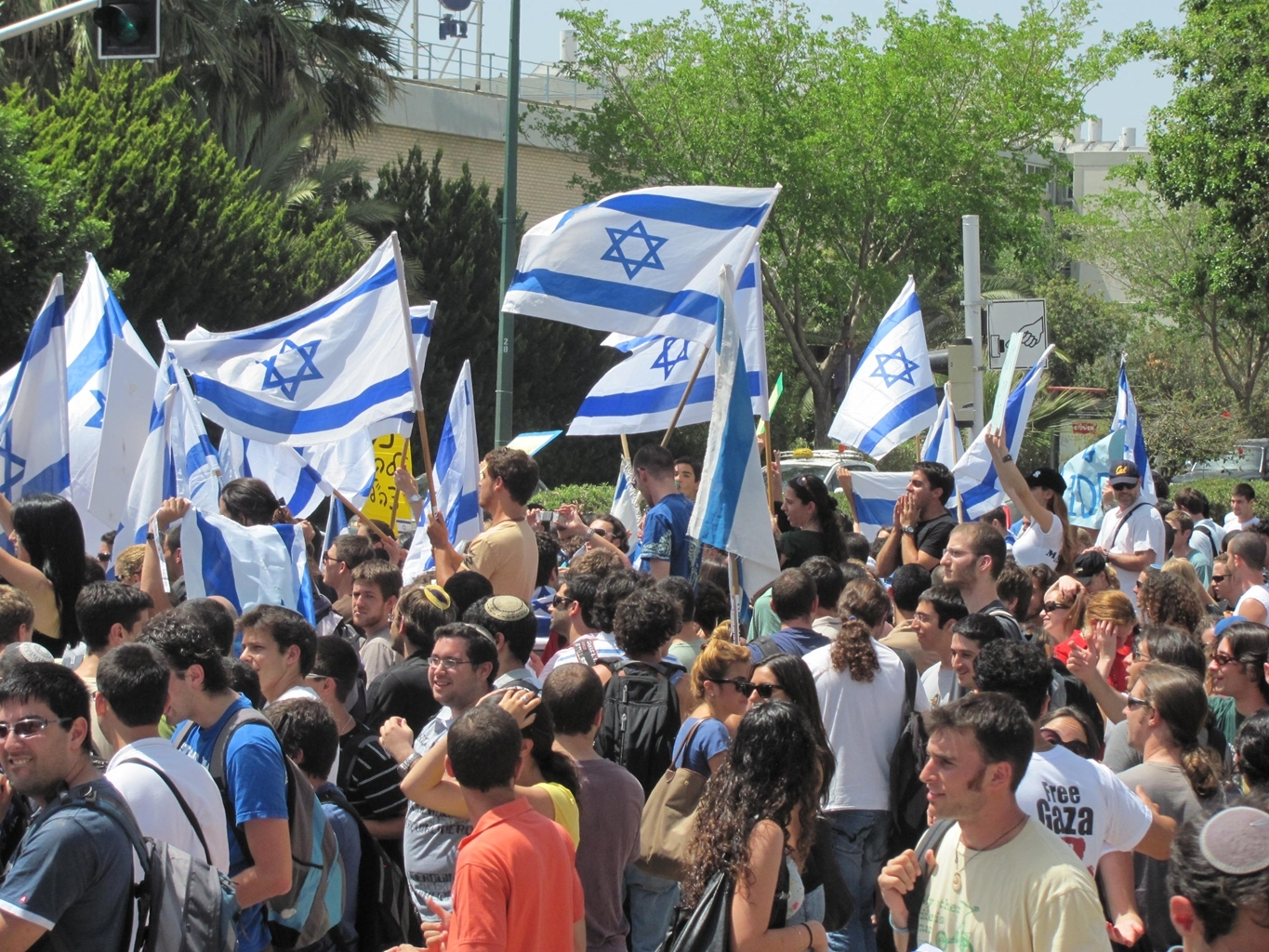
A demonstration of Tel Aviv University students supporting Israel and Shayetet 13 against the Gaza Flotilla 2010

Many pro-Israeli rallies took place within the country, including by Sderot residents, in Qiryat Shmona and student rallies in the Technion, University of Haifa, Ben Gurion University, Hebrew University of Jerusalem and Tel Aviv University. The rallies included hundreds of demonstrators waving the flag of Israel and chanting slogans in support of the IDF and Shayetet 13. A large and fierce protest was held in front of the Turkish embassy, which included slogans such as "Shayetet 13, we are with you," "We are all the IDF," "Cold weapons kill." Protesters also accused Turkish Prime Minister Recep Tayyip Erdoğan of "supporting terrorism" and equated him with Osama Bin-Laden and Mahmoud Ahmadinejad. They also chanted, "The [Gaza] flotilla is burning," while carrying signs reading, "Ahmadinejad=Erdogan". The organizers of the embassy protest described themselves as young zionists.

In Los Angeles about 1000 demonstrators were protesting in front of the Turkish Consulate on 1 June in support of Israel. A Jewish high school student was seen walking through a crowd of anti-Israeli protesters alone, carrying a large Israeli flag. Police officers feared for his safety, and escorted him to protect him from potential attacks. On 6 June, demonstrators rallied to show solidarity with Israel at the Israeli consulate in Los Angeles. Notable attendees included Governor Arnold Schwarzenegger, Republican gubernatorial candidate Steve Poizner, actor Jon Voight, Republican Senate contender Chuck DeVore, Representative Brad Sherman and Rabbi Marvin Hier of the Simon Wiesenthal Center, Los Angeles City Controller Wendy Greuel, City Council members Paul Koretz and Janice Hahn, Judea Pearl, and David Pine of Americans for Peace Now. Several Christian groups were also represented. In New York City, a number of pro-Israel Jews gathered to show their support for Israel. While in Baltimore a pro-Israel rally, organized by the Baltimore Zionist District, sought to raise awareness of what supporters called an act of self-defense by Israel against Hamas. As many as 600 people gathered on 6 June at the Torch of Friendship in downtown Miami's Bayfront Park. North Miami Beach City Council member Frantz Pierre led the crowd in a chant of "Peace, peace, peace". Jewish and Christian religious leaders were present. Mohammad S. Shakir, a Muslim and director of the Asian American Advisory Board in the Miami-Dade County Office of Community Advocacy, made a speech.

On 2 June, in London the Zionist Federation of Great Britain and Ireland organized a pro-Israel rally in front of Israeli embassy. On 4 June, a demonstration was held in Vienna. On 6 June an event in support of Israel in Paris was cancelled due to threats from pro-Palestinian groups. On 6 June, a rally was held in Brussels.

The National Union of Israeli Students planned to send a Kurdish freedom flotilla. According to Boaz Torporovsky, President of the Student Union, the plan is to send a flotilla of ships "to deliver much-needed humanitarian assistance to the Kurds of Turkey".

Israeli Arab members of the Knesset, Israel's parliament, received numerous death threats after the incident. A bus driver hired by the Israeli military to transport soldiers put up a sign on the bus saying: "Shayetet 13, shame on you. Why did you kill so few?"

=== Polls ===
A Rasmussen Reports national telephone poll in the United States of 1000 voters found that 49% of respondents blame pro-Palestinian activists on the Gaza bound aid ships for the deaths that resulted. 19% blamed Israel and 32% were not sure. 51% of those polled thought that Israel should allow an international investigation into the incident, while 25% agreed with Israel's refusal.

A Yougov survey found that 55% of the Britons polled believed Israel had overreacted, 27% didn't know and 18% thought they'd acted in self-defence. When asked about an international investigation, an overwhelming 74% believed it should be conducted by an international group. 4% thought it should be led by Israel, 12% didn't know, and 11% thought an inquiry shouldn't be held as it was a distraction from peace negotiations.

=== Flotilla movement ===
Jewish Voices for a Just Peace, a group of German Jews belonging to the European Jews for a Just Peace that plans to send a boat with humanitarian aid to break the Gaza blockade, has received a large number of request to travel with the ship, and is searching for a second vessel to accommodate additional participants.

== Others ==
In Ireland, Lord Mayor of Cork Dara Murphy opened a book of condolence.

Four trucks carrying tents, blankets and 13 power generators were donated by Russia and Oman.

== Result of international actions ==
=== United Nations Security Council ===
The United Nations Security Council convened an emergency meeting at the request of Turkey, during which the Turkish foreign minister stated "Israel must be held accountable for its crimes" (prior to the meeting, the Palestinian ambassador to the UN called for an independent Security Council investigation). While the British ambassador said Israel should end the Gaza blockade and take steps for an investigation, the US deputy permanent representative supported the Israeli position that humanitarian aid should have gone by "accepted international mechanisms", and the Israeli deputy permanent representative said the flotilla was not humanitarian but had a mission of breaking the blockade.

The United States directly intervened to prevent the United Nations Security Council's statement, which requested an "impartial" investigation of the deaths and condemned those "acts" that led to it, from resembling that drafted by Turkey, the Palestinians and Arab states, which called for condemnation "in the strongest terms" and an independent international inquiry. 12 hours of negotiations were required to come up with a statement that suited all.

As a result of the emergency meeting that went into the early hours of the morning, the council agreed condemn the acts that resulted in the deaths and injuries aboard the Mavi Marmara. They also called for a prompt, impartial, credible and transparent investigation conforming to international standards. This was different from what Turkey and the Arab states were demanded – an independent international investigation—leaving open the possibility of who would conduct the investigation.

=== United Nations Human Rights Council ===
The United Nations Human Rights Council passed a resolution by 32 votes to 3, with a number of abstentions, in which it condemned in the strongest terms the outrageous attack by the Israeli forces that resulted in the killing and injuring of many innocent civilians from different countries, and decided to dispatch an independent international fact finding mission to investigate violations of international law resulting from the Israeli attack.

== See also ==
- Legal assessments of the Gaza flotilla raid
- International reactions to the Gaza War (2008–09)
