= IJV =

IJV may refer to:

- International joint venture, when two businesses based in two or more countries form a partnership
- Independent Jewish Voices, a Jewish political organization based in the United Kingdom
- Independent Jewish Voices Canada, a Jewish political organization based in Canada
- Internal jugular vein, in anatomy
