= Union of Belarusian Jewish Public Associations and Communities =

- Headquarters: Minsk
- Region served: Belarus
- Chairman: Rogatnikov Oleg Lvovich
- Website: www.beljews.by

The Union of Belarusian Jewish Public Associations and Communities is an umbrella organization representing Belarusian Jews. It is one of the primary organizations representing the Jewish community in Belarus.

== About ==
The organization is headquartered in Minsk. The Union is a member of the Coordination Council for the Rights of National Minorities of the government of Belarus.

== History ==
In 2021, Belarusian state-linked media accused the Union and other Jewish organizations in Belarus of being "disloyal", being paid by foreign agents, and of participating in anti-government protests.

In 2023, the Union cosigned a statement released by the American Jewish Committee calling for tech companies to do more to address increasing antisemitism online.

== See also ==
- History of the Jews in Belarus
