= European Jews for a Just Peace =

Human rights-focused federation of European Jewish groups

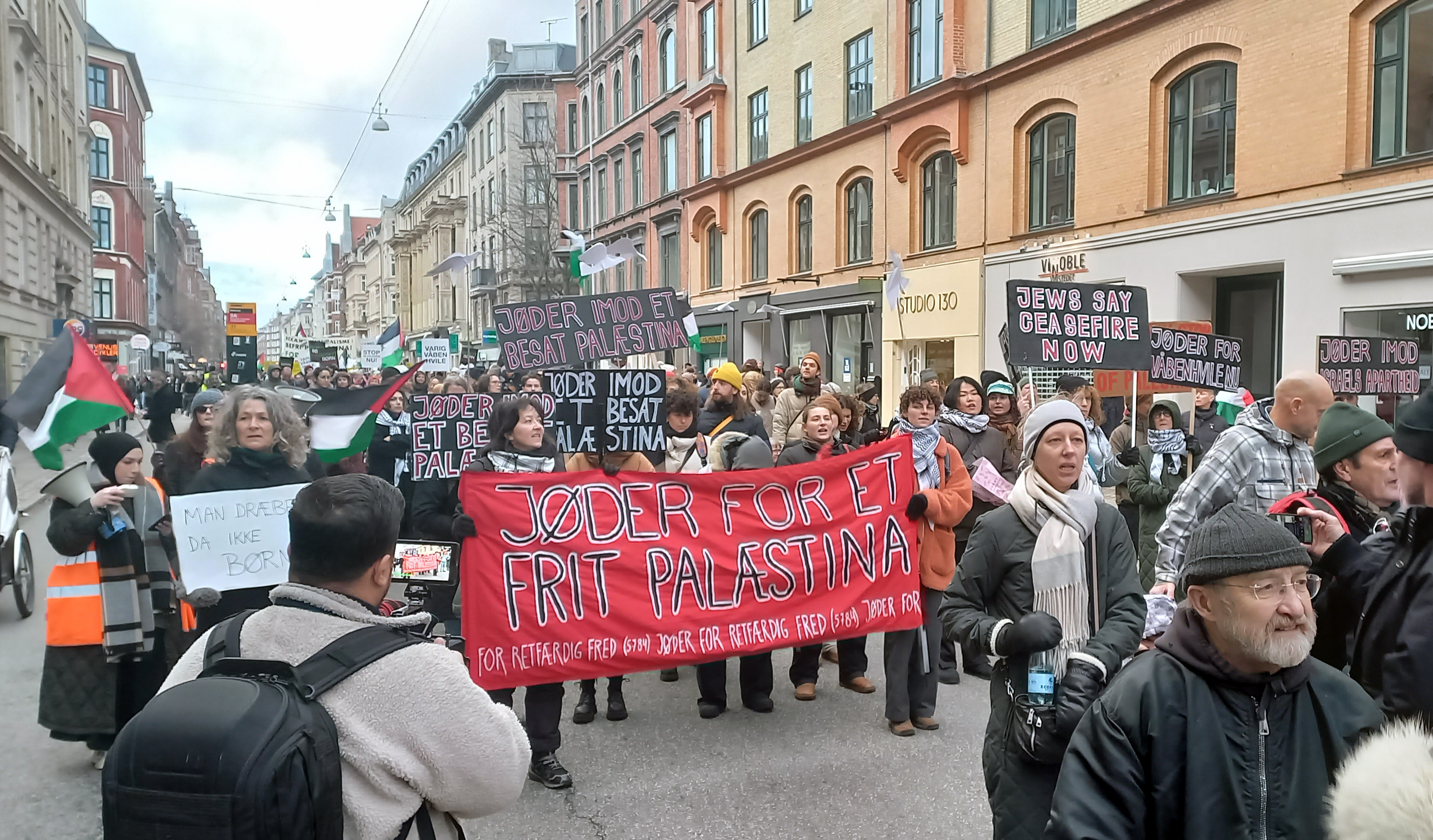
Jews for a Just Peace during a Gaza war protests in Copenhagen, Denmark (2024)

European Jews for a Just Peace (EJJP) is a federation of Jewish pro-Palestinian groups in ten European countries aimed at bringing about peace in the Middle East and ensuring respect for the human and political rights of the Palestinian people. One of the claims of EJJP is Israel's immediate withdrawal from the occupied territories.

== History ==
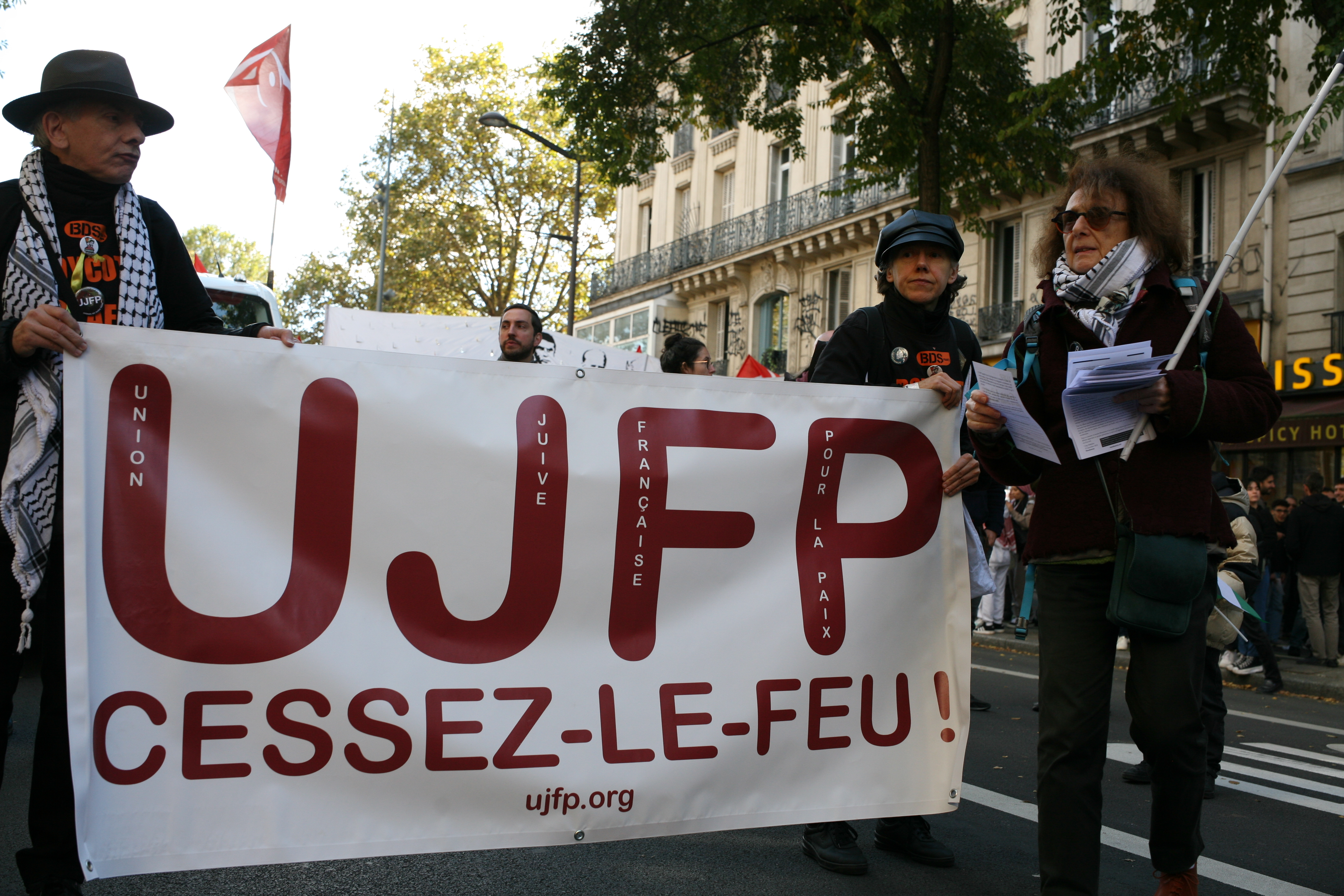
Jewish French Union for Peace in Paris, France (2024)

The organization was founded in Amsterdam, the Netherlands in September 2002. Its principles are contained in its Amsterdam Declaration of 2002, amended in 2004. These are:

- the condemnation of all violence against civilians in the conflict, no matter by whom it is carried out;
- the recognition of Israel's 1967 'green line' borders;
- commitment to the Palestinians' right to a state in the territories currently occupied by Israel in the West Bank, East Jerusalem, and Gaza;
- the recognition of the right of both states to have Jerusalem as their capital;
- calling on Israel to acknowledge its part in the creation of the Palestinian refugee problem and its obligation to negotiate a just, fair and practical resolution of the issue.

In an opinion article published in The Guardian in February 2009, Antony Lerman, the former director of the Institute for Jewish Policy Research (2006–2009), considers that Jewish peace groups like European Jews for a Just Peace and Independent Jewish Voices in Canada and Australia "may have a moderating influence on Israel" as "Israel is heavily dependent on what Jews think".

In September 2010, EJJP organized a Gaza-bound aid boat, the "Jewish Boat to Gaza", carrying nine Jewish activists. It was intercepted by the Israel Defense Forces and led to the port of Ashdod.

The EJJP chairperson, Dror Feiler, an Israel-born Swedish national, was again aboard the French Dignité-Al Karama ship in the 2010 Freedom Flotilla for Gaza.

== Member organizations ==
- Austria: Jüdische Stimme für gerechten Frieden in Nahost (Jewish Voice for a Just Peace in the Near East)
- Belgium: Union des progressistes juifs de Belgique
- Denmark: European Jews for a Just Peace – Denmark
- France: Union juive française pour la paix (Jewish French Union for Peace)
- Germany: Jüdische Stimme für gerechten Frieden in Nahost (Jewish Voice for a Just Peace in the Near East)
- Italy: Rete Ebrei contro l'occupazione ("Rete ECO", Italian Network of Jews Against the Occupation)
- the Netherlands: Een Ander Joods Geluid (A Different Jewish Voice)
- Sweden: Judar för israelisk-palestinsk fred (Jews for Israeli–Palestinian Peace)
- Switzerland: Jüdische Stimme für einen gerechten Frieden zwischen Israel und Palästina (Jewish Voice for a Just Peace between Israel and Palestine)
- United Kingdom: Jewish Socialists' Group and Jews for Justice for Palestinians

== See also ==
- Jewish anti-Zionism
- Jewish pro-Palestinian activism
- Palestinian right of return
- Palestinian statehood
