= Jewish Voice for Peace =

American Jewish anti-Zionist advocacy group

- JVP logo since 2020
- Abbreviation: JVP
- Founded: September 1996 (30 years ago)
- Founded at: University of California, Berkeley
- Type: Advocacy organization
- Tax ID no.: 90-0018359
- Legal status: 501(c)(3) organization
- Location: Berkeley, California, United States
- Executive Director: Stefanie Fox
- Chairperson: Jethro Eisenstein
- Revenue: $11 million (2024)
- Expenses: $5.2 million (2024)
- Website: jewishvoiceforpeace.org

Jewish Voice for Peace (JVP; Hebrew: קוֹל יְהוּדִי לַשָּׁלוֹם, romanized: Qōl Yəhūḏī la-Ššālōm) is an American anti-Zionist, pro-Palestinian solidarity, and left-wing advocacy organization. It is critical of Israel's occupation of the Palestinian territories, and supports the Boycott, Divestment and Sanctions (BDS) campaign against Israel.

The group was formed in 1996, and as of 2024 had grown to over 32,000 active dues-paying members. Its chapters at Florida's public universities and at Columbia, Brandeis and George Washington universities were suspended by the universities in 2024.

== History ==
JVP was founded in 1996 by Julie Iny, Rachel Eisner and Julia Caplan, undergraduate students of University of California, Berkeley.

JVP mostly consists of American Jews and non-Jewish people that it refers as "allies" who attempt to draw more attention to the Israeli–Palestinian conflict by protesting and committing civil disobedience, one of JVP's most popular slogans used in protests is "Not in my name".

The organization has been involved in a number of controversies. The Anti-Defamation League accused it of "exploiting the Jewish culture" and the Israeli government blacklisted it from entering Israel due to the high presence of BDS activists within JVP.

=== Funding ===
In 2023, JVP reported revenue of $3.32 million and expenses of $2.7 million. In 2024, the group's revenue had grown to $11 million and its expenses were $5.2 million. According to JVP in 2024, around 85% of the organization's funding comes from "tens of thousands of individual people [...] whose average-sized contribution is $60". JVP has also received support from philanthropic foundations including the Kaphan Foundation, the Open Society Foundations, and the Rockefeller Brothers Fund. According to NBC News, the Rockefeller Brothers Fund awarded JVP "close to a half-million dollars" over a five-year period.

In January 2025, JVP agreed to pay $677,634 to resolve allegations of fraud brought by the U.S. Department of Justice that JVP stated in their application to receive a second draw loan under the CARES Act that they were not "primarily engaged in political or lobbying activities". An investigation started as a result of a complaint by the Zionist Advocacy Center determined that JVP was primarily engaged in political activities.

== Views ==
Its views are characterized as left-wing, and it is regarded as one of the more professionalized groups of the Palestinian rights movement. Many of JVP's members consider the views of dovish liberal Jewish groups like J Street to be inadequate. According to its political director, identification as a Zionist and a progressive is impossible. In contrast with Palestinian-led organizations such as Within Our Lifetime, JVP seeks to work within the Democratic Party to shift the party's position to the left on the Israeli–Palestinian conflict. JVP has been described by Dov Waxman as further to the left than J Street or IfNotNow.

JVP criticizes what it describes as the "severe human-rights violations that Israel engages in every day".

=== Zionism ===
JVP endorses the Palestinian right of return. In 2019, JVP declared itself anti-Zionist, arguing that contemporary Zionism had become a settler-colonial movement, and Israel had become an apartheid state. The organization views Zionism as an Ashkenazi-led movement with its roots in Europe, which created a "racist hierarchy" that erased the history of Jewish communities in the Arab world, North Africa, and East Africa.

=== Boycott, divestment and sanctions ===
On February 20, 2015, JVP endorsed the Boycott, Divestment and Sanctions (BDS) movement after previously supporting selective divestment from companies operating in Israeli-occupied territories, stating "JVP rejects the assertion that BDS is inherently anti-Semitic, and we encourage discussion both within our own community and outside of it of the growing BDS movement." JVP justifies its support for the movement by arguing that BDS provides a vehicle allowing individuals all over the world in the Jewish diaspora to bring about real change by threatening in their consumer choices to lower the profits of any business that by their activities reinforces Israel's occupation of the Palestinian territories. JVP's executive director Rebecca Vilkomerson stated: "We do feel connected to the global BDS movement. We consider ourselves a part of it."

=== Gaza war ===
JVP attributed the 2023 Hamas attack on Israel and the subsequent Gaza war to "Israeli apartheid and occupation—and United States complicity in that oppression." JVP said "Inevitably, oppressed people everywhere will seek—and gain—their freedom." JVP called for the U.S. government to "immediately take steps to withdraw military funding to Israel and to hold the Israeli government accountable for its gross violations of human rights and war crimes against Palestinians." Following the attack, the organization "liked" a post on social media which described the conflict as "the latest unprecedented wave of resistance" by Palestinians. When questioned by The Forward, the organization removed its like from the post in question. JVP used language urging lawmakers to examine the "root cause" of Hamas's attack, which they believe is Israeli occupation. The Forward wrote that this was a way for JVP "to acknowledge how objectionable most observers found the attacks on civilians while keeping their advocacy focused on pressuring the Israeli government to make concessions."

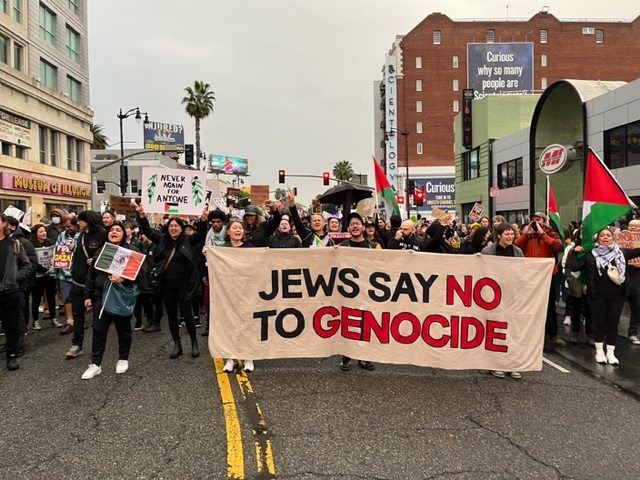
November 15, 2023, protest with Jewish Voice for Peace and If Not Now on Hollywood Blvd

Since November 2023, JVP's chapter at Columbia University has been under suspension. The university stated that both the JVP chapter and Students for Justice in Palestine had breached university policies, engaging in "threatening rhetoric and intimidation", leading to the suspension of the clubs.

In November 2023, the Anti-Defamation League (ADL) classified anti-war protest events led by Jewish groups including Jewish Voice for Peace and IfNotNow as "anti-Israel", adding the protests to a database documenting rising antisemitism in the US. ADL CEO Jonathan Greenblatt labelled the Jewish organizations as "hate groups" and equated anti-Zionism with antisemitism. This led to criticism of the ADL, including from its own staff, one of whom quit in protest, stating: "Those were Jewish people who we [as the ADL] were defaming, so that felt extremely, extremely confusing, and frustrating to me. And it makes it harder to talk about that when any criticism of Israel, or anyone who criticizes Israel, just becomes a terrorist."

In June 2024, JVP media coordinator Liv Kunins-Berkowitz criticized far-right activists expressing support for Palestinians during the war. She stated, "While it is essential that everyone speak up and use their platforms to oppose the Israeli military's genocide in Gaza, we are alarmed by those who are exploiting this moment to promote their own platforms, especially when they have a history of promoting white supremacy, antisemitism, and homophobia. As we focus on ending the genocide, it is important to promote leaders and content that upholds the dignity of all human beings."

In August 2024, George Washington University suspended its JVP chapter through to December of that year along with eight other student groups for unapproved protests on campus.

After the IDF killed Hezbollah leader Hassan Nasrallah in Lebanon in September 2024, Instagram removed posts from JVP's University of Michigan chapter that spoke in support of Nasrallah.

In August 2025, the JVP chapter at George Washington University was again suspended until May 2026 for "hosting an on-campus event without advisor approval and publishing an April 22 social media post that created a "hostile environment" for Jewish students". A member of the organization said the JVP chapter would disaffiliate from the university as a result of the suspension but that "anti-Zionist Jewish students will continue to organize and pressure the university to divest from genocide and protect its students amid an attack against immigrants and anti-Zionists in academia and across the country."

== Activities ==
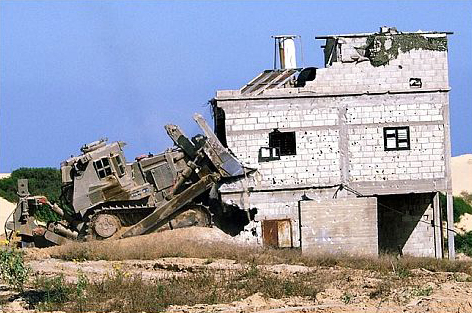
An IDF Caterpillar D9L razing a house in the Gaza Strip

During 2004 and 2005, JVP protested Caterpillar Inc. for selling bulldozers to Israel, and said that Israel's use of the D9 armoured bulldozers in the West Bank and Gaza Strip was a violation of human rights and Caterpillar's business code of conduct. Along with four Christian groups, JVP introduced a shareholder resolution calling on Caterpillar to re-examine its sales of bulldozers to Israel. The resolution was rejected by 97 percent of the votes at the Caterpillar 2005 shareholders' meeting. JVP continued to introduce shareholder resolutions at Caterpillar shareholder meetings every year since 2005. In 2010 the resolution received 20% of the vote.

In September 2010, Israeli artists came to JVP asking for US support to an artistic boycott of the theater in the city of Ariel, in the Israeli-occupied territories. JVP drafted a statement that was signed by over 150 theater and film professionals. On the significance of the action, JVP said that it "was the first time such mainstream figures had drawn a line around normalizing settlements which are illegal according to international law, and which constitute one of the main impediments to a lasting peace between Israelis and Palestinians".

In June 2014, when the General Assembly of the Presbyterian Church (USA) voted to divest its stock in Caterpillar, Hewlett-Packard, and Motorola Solutions to protest "the companies' profiting from the Israeli occupation of the Palestinian territories and pressure Israel to withdraw", JVP members attended the church's convention and supported the divestment measure. Rabbi Alissa Wise, a JVP co-director of organizing, told the Presbyterians that to her, divestment "helps Palestinians build their power. So that Israel is convinced, not by force, but by global consensus that something has to change."

=== Demonstrations and events ===
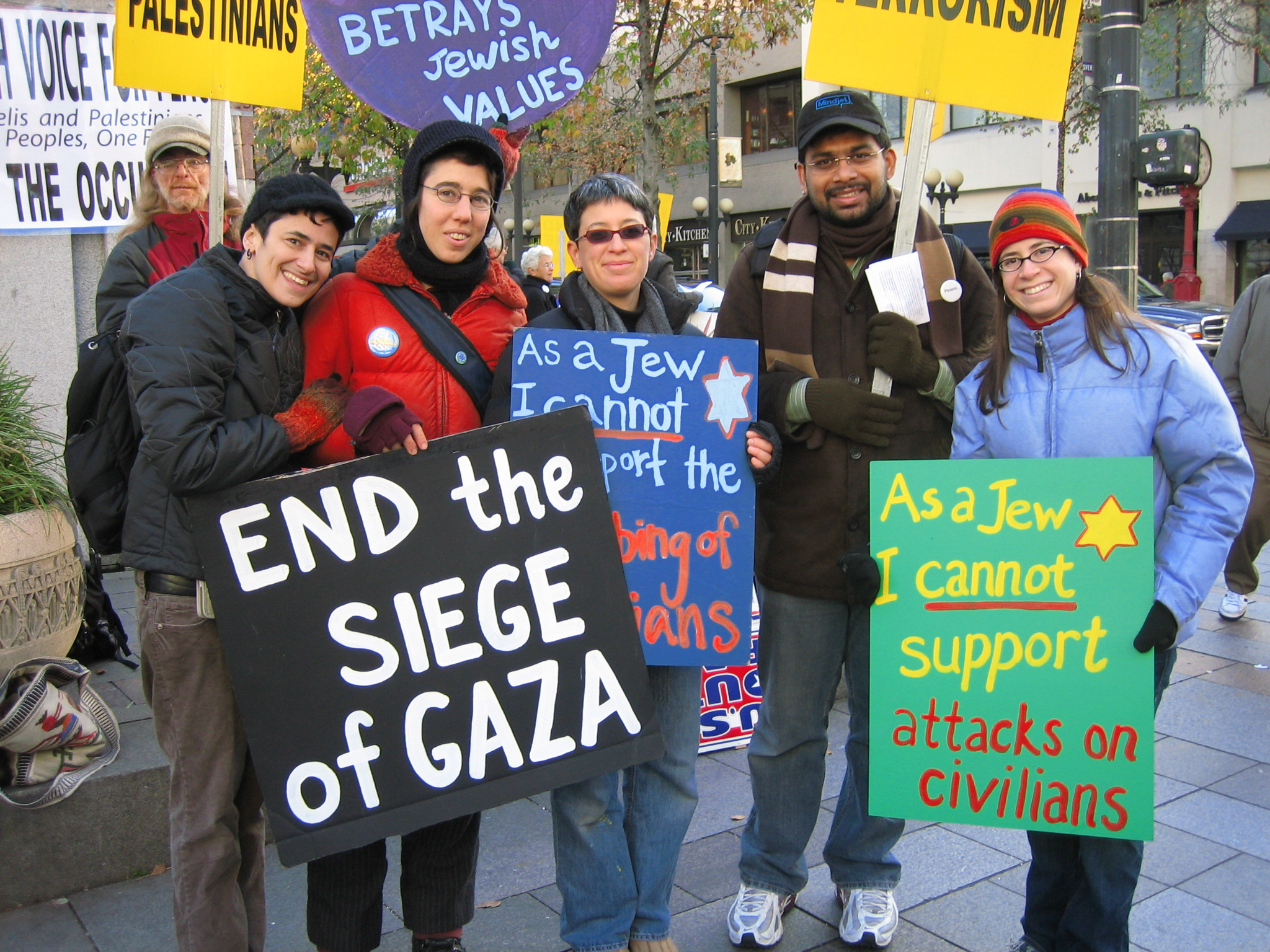
December 2, 2006, protest in downtown Seattle with Jewish Voice for Peace, Palestine Solidarity Committee, Voices of Palestine, Dyke Community Activists and Women in Black

In 2006, JVP helped organize a demonstration outside a meeting of the American Israel Public Affairs Committee (AIPAC) in Sacramento, California. The stated purpose of the protest was to argue that AIPAC does not represent the views of all American Jews regarding Israel. As part of a coalition of over 100 organizations, JVP participated in the 2011 Move Over AIPAC conference.

On February 25, 2007, JVP was one of twelve groups that sponsored a demonstration in Teaneck, New Jersey, against the sale of homes in Israeli settlements in the West Bank. The organizations said that in the past, such homes were "sold exclusively to Jewish people" and that Palestinians were not allowed to buy them "because of their religion and their ethnicity". The groups said that the home sale, which took place at Congregation Bnai Yeshurun in Teaneck, might violate international law and New Jersey laws against discriminatory sales practices.

The JVP position on the 2008–2009 Israel–Gaza conflict was that Israel's actions were "an opportunistic agenda for short-term political gain at an immense cost in Palestinian lives" which are "illegal and immoral and should be condemned in the strongest possible terms". JVP joined marches and demonstrations condemning the Israeli military's attacks on Gaza in many cities, including Racine, Wisconsin, and Seattle.

The Young Jewish Declaration is a project created by young JVP leaders. Young Jewish and Proud debuted at the 2010 Jewish General Assembly when five of its members disrupted Israeli Prime Minister Benjamin Netanyahu's speech.

In 2020, JVP, under moderation by leader Rabbi Alissa Wise, hosted a virtual panel on antisemitism featuring Marc Lamont Hill, Barbara Ransby, Peter Beinart and Rashida Tlaib as speakers. They spoke against antisemitism being used to label advocacy in support of Palestine, while additionally attributing the right as being the largest source of antisemitism, referencing the 2019 Poway synagogue shooting as an example.

In 2022, together with MPower Change, they launched a campaign called No Tech for Apartheid – also known as #NoTechForApartheid – opposing Project Nimbus.

Along with IfNotNow, JVP led an October 16, 2023, rally in Washington, D.C. which called for a ceasefire in the Gaza war and for United States President Joe Biden to support a ceasefire. Among the speakers was actor Wallace Shawn. On October 27, protestors organized by Jewish Voice for Peace occupied Grand Central Terminal in New York City, calling for a ceasefire and wearing t-shirts saying "Not in our name". On November 6, about 500 members of Jewish Voice for Peace–New York City took part in a sit-in at the Statue of Liberty to demand a ceasefire. Photographer Nan Goldin addressed the demonstration, saying, "As long as the people of Gaza are screaming, we need to yell louder, no matter who attempts to silence us."

In 2024, JVP led the Break the Bonds campaign, supporting local efforts to divest from Israel Bonds.

On March 13, 2025, protesters gathered in the lobby of the Trump Tower to protest the arrest of Mahmoud Khalil by ICE. Many protesters were seen wearing shirts that said, "Not in Our Name". One of the protesters, Stony Brook University professor and activist Josh Dubnau, explained that the choice of venue was symbolic since it was the spot were Trump launched his first presidential campaign in 2015. 98 of the protesters were arrested on the charges of trespassing and resisting arrest.

The JVP convened its largest ever conference in April 2025 in Baltimore, Maryland. Attendees included Rashida Tlaib, Cori Bush, Naomi Klein, and Linda Sarsour. Attendees participated in chants supportive of Palestinians, students, immigrants, and transgender people. Many attendees wore keffiyehs, a symbol of Palestinian resistance. According to Religion News Service, during the Gaza war JVP saw "a surge in popularity" that was striking for "a decades-old group that has long been dismissed as fringe or even accused of being antisemitic — including by fellow Jewish groups." Religion News Services noted that "some of the political power JVP accrued on Capitol Hill has diminished. Progressive Democrats, particularly members of the left-leaning 'squad,' rallied with the group last year, but some, such as former Missouri Rep. Cori Bush, lost their reelection bid".

=== Publication ===
In 2004, JVP published a collection of essays entitled Reframing Anti-Semitism: Alternative Jewish Perspectives. Among the topics it discussed were antisemitism and stereotypes of Jews in modern America. It argued that the Jewish left and critics of Israeli policy had ceded the fight against antisemitism to the Jewish right and that critics of Israel or Israeli policies should not be accused of antisemitism.

== Reception ==
Opponents of Jewish Voice for Peace argue that the organization's views lie outside of the Jewish communal consensus. The ADL, a vocal longtime critic of the organization, has argued that JVP unfairly places the onus of resolving the conflict on Israel. JVP has at times been denied participation or membership in broader Jewish community events or spaces. While some Jewish leaders concede that the community is too quick to censor criticism of Israel, even the Jewish state's critics among the community are reluctant to welcome JVP into the fold. JVP has been criticized for partnering with groups including The Electronic Intifada, Al-Awda, and the Movement for Black Lives, all of which have characterized Israel's treatment of Palestinians as apartheid and accused the state of genocide.

According to political scientist Dov Waxman, the anger which JVP's actions and positions arouse in many other American Jewish groups is just one index of a broader polarizing controversy within the Jewish American community at large, whose leaders had hitherto managed to shut out internal disagreements from the public purview. Since the 2010s, there has been a shift toward greater tolerance for JVP within the community. Some left-wing Jews have praised the organization for giving an outlet to younger Jews who are more critical toward Israel.

In 2017, JVP was criticized for inviting Rasmea Odeh, a former PFLP member convicted by Israeli military courts for her role in the 1969 Jerusalem supermarket bombing, as a featured speaker in its biennial conference. Odeh was subsequently deported from the United States after pleading guilty to immigration fraud and lost her American citizenship.

== See also ==
- +972 Magazine
- Ameinu
- Breira (organization)
- Brit Tzedek v'Shalom
- Een Ander Joods Geluid (Netherlands)
- European Jews for a Just Peace
- IfNotNow
- Independent Australian Jewish Voices
- Independent Jewish Voices (UK)
- Independent Jewish Voices (Canada)
- Jews for Justice for Palestinians
- Neturei Karta
- Partners for Progressive Israel
- Peace Movement – Israel
