= Jews for Justice for Palestinians =

British pro-Palestinian political advocacy group

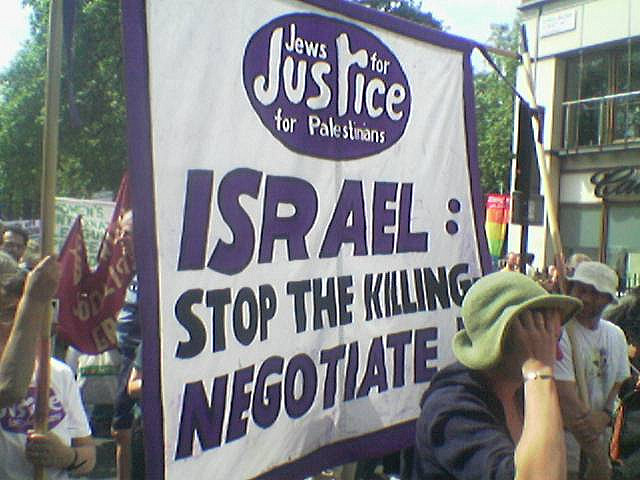
- A JJP banner in 2006
- Abbreviation: JJP
- Formation: 17 February 2002; 24 years ago
- Founder: Irene Bruegel, Richard Kuper and others
- Purpose: Advocate for freedom for the Palestinian people and a change in political status of the Palestinian territories
- Location: United Kingdom
- Members: 3,022 (2024)
- Affiliations: European Jews for a Just Peace
- Website: jfjfp.com

Jews for Justice for Palestinians (JJP) is a Jewish activist group based in Britain that advocates for human and civil rights, and economic and political freedom, for the Palestinian people. It opposes the current policy of Israel towards the Palestinian territories, particularly the territories of the West Bank and Gaza Strip, and seeks a change in their political status. Its membership is primarily British Jews.

== Background ==
The organisation was founded around 17 February 2002 by UK academic Irene Bruegel, the daughter of German-Jewish refugees, and her partner, Richard Kuper, together with many, mainly female, Jewish friends, just after Bruegel had toured the West Bank. Within six years it achieved as membership of 1,300 out of a UK Jewish population of over a quarter of a million and over that period proved instrumental, according to an obituary, in "shattering the illusion that all Jews unconditionally support the Israeli government." It grew out of a reaction to the Al-Aqsa Intifada, which had rapidly led to the formation of a movement of British Jews opposed to Zionism who formed JPUK (Just Peace, United Kingdom) in October 2000. The deployment of the word "Palestinian" in their name led to some controversy, but was retained. Bruegel's political skills quickly made it the largest organization of this type in its field. It played a significant role in the establishment of a broader organization, the European Jews for a Just Peace.

It describes itself as welcoming to all Jews, practising or secular, Zionist or not, who share opposition to Israeli policies that could be seen as threatening Palestinian rights. It works through cultural events to increase public awareness critical of such policies.

It supports a wide range of Israeli peace and human-rights groups working towards these same ends. One of its leaders, Richard Kuper, was active in forming a coalition of Jews who sailed in late 2010 from Cyprus in an effort to break the blockade of the Gaza Strip, some months after the 2010 Gaza flotilla raid.

Its stated reasons for supporting Palestinian rights are promoting human rights and that this is the best means of securing peace for Israelis. It supports the right of Israelis to live in freedom and security within Israel's 1967 borders.

It organises to give voice to the many strands of Israeli peace activism and to ensure that Jewish opinions critical of Israeli policy are heard in Britain. It believes that such opposition is important in countering antisemitism and the claim that opposition to Israel's policies is itself antisemitic. David Hirsh quit the organisation in 2016 because some of its signatories questioned the good faith of those supporting allegations of antisemitism in the Labour Party.

It cooperates with other organisations on specific issues without necessarily endorsing them. Together with others, it calls on the British and European Union governments to suspend trade agreements with Israel, recognise the Palestinian Authority and support it financially, to cease to trade arms with Israel, push for the enforcement of international law in the region and strive for fair and free negotiations between the parties.

It supports the British Shalom-Salaam Trust which funds a variety of humanitarian and educational projects in Israel and Palestine.

It is a founder member of the Enough! Coalition in the UK in 2007.

== Open letters ==
JJP has organised a number of petitions and open letters on political and human rights questions signed by distinguished British Jews from academia, the arts and other fields of activity.

A letter to the Foreign and Commonwealth Secretary David Miliband of September 2007, urging Her Majesty's Government to speak at the United Nations against Israeli sanctions in Gaza, printed in The Times, was signed among many others by:

- Zygmunt Bauman
- Stanley Cohen
- Miriam David
- Stephen Fry
- Eric Hobsbawm
- Michael Horovitz
- Nicholas Hytner
- Brian Klug
- Steven Lukes
- Miriam Margolyes
- Paul Oestreicher
- Susie Orbach
- Harold Pinter
- Michael Rosen
- Alexei Sayle
- Lynne Segal
- Gillian Slovo
- Janet Suzman
- Michelene Wandor

== See also ==
- European Jews for a Just Peace
- Jewish pro-Palestinian activism
- Jewish Voice for Peace

== Sources ==
- Cohen, Justin (1 June 2016). "Academic quits Jews for Justice for Palestinians, saying: 'They're part of the problem'". Jewish News. The Times of Israel.
- Gruner, Peter (23 October 2008). "Goodnight Irene, friends' farewell to a 'great campaigner'". Camden New Journal.
- Himmelweit, Sue; Mohun, Simon (15 October 2008). "Obituary: Irene Bruegel: Academic and activist against injustice". The Guardian.
- "Jewish activists set sail for Gaza planning to break blockade". The Guardian. Associated Press. 26 September 2010.
- Landy, David (2012). Jewish Identity and Palestinian Rights: Diaspora Jewish Opposition to Israel. Zed Books. ISBN 978-1-848-13929-9.
- Rosen, Ehud (2011). Mapping the Organizational Sources of the Global Delegitimization Campaign Against Israel in the UK. Jerusalem Center for Public Affairs. ISBN 978-9-652-18094-0.
- "Signatories". Jews for Justice for Palestinians.
