= Union of Progressive Jews of Belgium =

Belgian Jewish organization

- Union des progressistes juifs de Belgique
- Formation: 1939; 87 years ago

The Union of Progressive Jews of Belgium (French: Union des progressistes juifs de Belgique; UPJB) is a Belgian Jewish organization set up in 1939 as Solidarité juive (Jewish Solidarity) by antifascist Jews in Belgium, becoming in 1946 Solidarité juive, aide aux victimes de l'oppresseur nazi (Jewish Solidarity, help to the victims of the Nazi oppressor). It took on its present name in 1969.

== History ==
Just before WWII, refugees from Nazism came to Belgium, some clandestinely. Jews and communists were heavily represented among them, some of whom assembled in informal movements such as Main-d'oeuvre étrangère and Main-d'œuvre immigrée (as in neighbouring France). Aid associations were created, such as Le Secours rouge (Red Relief). When the war began, Solidarité juive was one of these associations and worked closely with the Comité de Défense des Juifs, and with Secours mutuel (left-wing Zionists). Members of Solidarité juive were active in rescuing and hiding Jewish children, but also as armed partisans in the Front de l'Indépendance and as information agents in Leopold Trepper's Red Orchestra, based in Brussels.

== Objectives ==
The objective of the UPJB is "The promotion of a contemporary, secular, and progressive Judaism in the diaspora, in the filiation of the struggle of the workers movement and of the anti-Nazi resistance."

== Belgian affiliations ==
The UPJB is not a member of the Comité de coordination des organisations juives de Belgique (CCOJB, Coordination Committee of Belgium's Jewish Organizations), the Belgian chapter of the World Jewish Congress, because it disagrees with one of its Zionist statutory clauses, "the association has for purpose the fight [...] for the support by all appropriate means of the State of Israel, spiritual centre of Judaism and safe haven of threatened Jewish communities."

In 2001, UPJB, through an open letter signed by its then president Elie Gross, supported the main Belgian French-speaking daily Le Soir during a campaign from the Belgian Zionist organizations, including the CCOJB, which accused its journalists of a systemic anti-Israeli bias.

In 2004-2005 the UPJB was member of the COIFE (French: Collectif d'associations opposées à l'interdiction du port du foulard à l'école, Collective of associations opposed to forbidding headscarf at school), comprising fifty-odd organizations.

== International affiliation ==
Since 2003, the UPJB has been affiliated to the European Jews for a Just Peace network, which comprises 17 Jewish organizations from nine European countries.

== Presidents ==
As of September 2017, the present president of the UPJB is Carine Bratzlavsky. Her predecessors were Jacques Ravedovitz (b. 1949), Henri Wajnblum (b. 1938) and Elie Gross (d. 2003).

== Press ==
The monthly magazine of the UPJB is named Points critiques. As of September 2017 it is only available in print and on subscription.
