= Brian Klug =

British philosopher

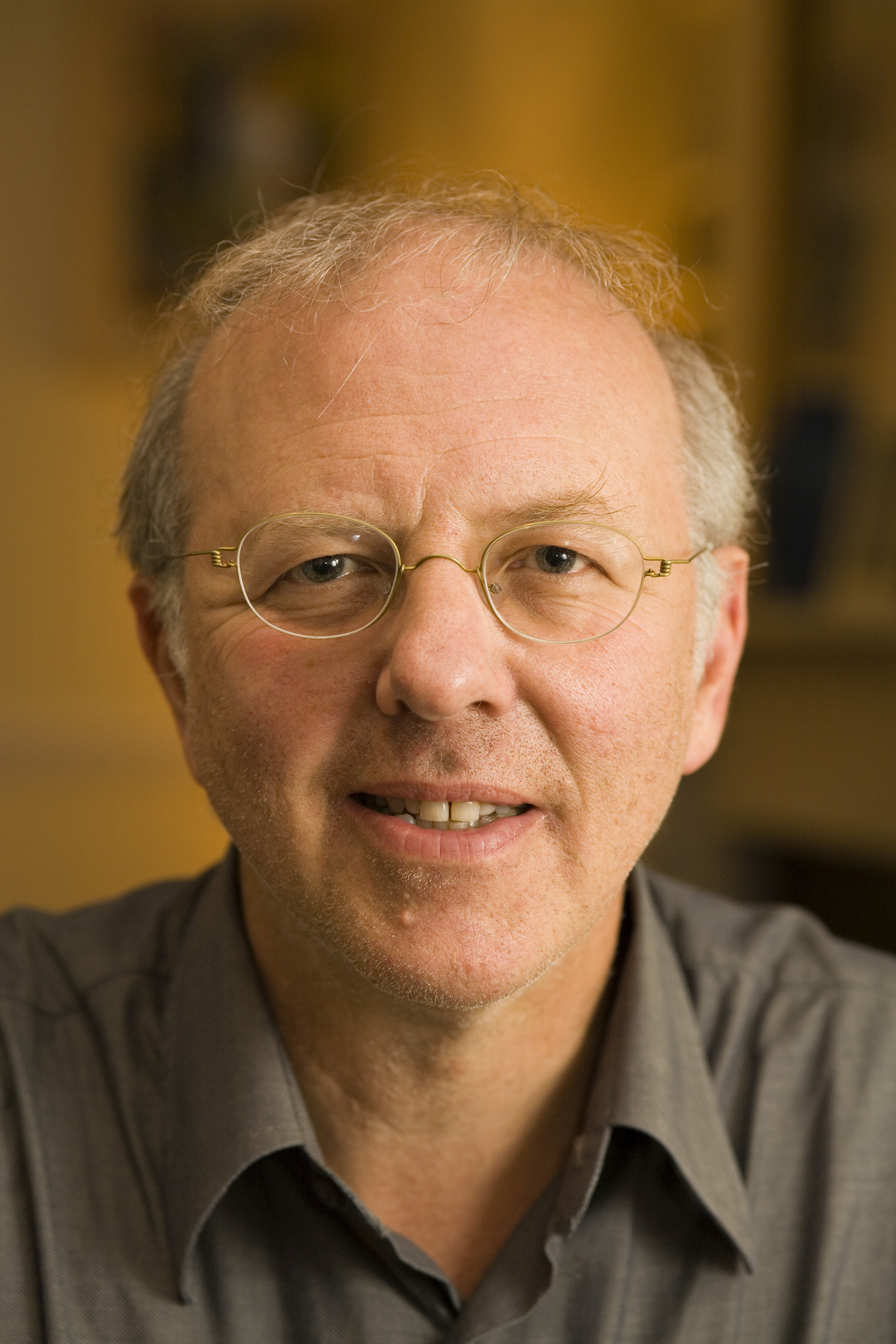
Dr. Brian Klug

Brian Klug is honorary fellow in social philosophy at Campion Hall, Oxford and an emeritus member of the philosophy faculty at Oxford University. He is also an honorary fellow of the Parkes Institute for the Study of Jewish/non-Jewish Relations, University of Southampton, and fellow of the College, Saint Xavier University, Chicago.

== Career ==
He is associate editor of Patterns of Prejudice, a peer-reviewed journal examining social exclusion and stigmatization, and a founder member of the Jewish Forum for Justice and Human Rights, a UK-based group that addressed racism and antisemitism, the Israeli–Palestinian conflict, immigration, and the treatment of asylum seekers.

Klug was one of a number of academics who submitted evidence to the British All-Party Parliamentary Inquiry into Antisemitism, which published its report in September 2006. He has criticized the concept of new antisemitism as being "confused" in his 2004 essay "The Myth of the New Anti-Semitism" published in The Nation, and in several other writings.

In February 2007, he was a signatory to the declaration of Independent Jewish Voices, a new Jewish group in the UK, which criticized the Board of Deputies of British Jews for its allegedly unconditional support of Israel.

He is a member of the scientific advisory council of the Islamophobia Studies Yearbook.

== Works ==
- Being Jewish and Doing Justice: Bringing Argument to Life, London: Vallentine Mitchell, 2011.
- Offence: The Jewish Case, London: Seagull Books, 2009.
- co-editor, A Time to Speak Out: Independent Jewish Voices on Israel, Zionism and Jewish Identity, London: Verso, 2008.
- co-editor, Children as Equals: Exploring the Rights of the Child, Lanham, MD: University Press of America, 2002.
- co-editor, Ethics, Value and Reality: Selected Papers of Aurel Kolnai, London: Athlone Press, 1977.
- editor, A Question of Degree: Assorted Papers on Assessment, London: Nuffield Foundation, 1976.
- "Ritual murmur: the undercurrent of protest against religious slaughter of animals in Britain in the 1980s", Patterns of Prejudice, vol. 23, no. 2, 1989.
- "The language of race", Patterns of Prejudice, vol. 33, no. 3, 1999.
- "The collective Jew: Israel and the new antisemitism", Patterns of Prejudice, vol. 37, no. 2, 2003, used as a resource by the EUMC in their report Manifestations of Antisemitism in the EU 2002-2003, Vienna, March 2004. See especially pp. 12–13, 225-241.
- "The Myth of the New Anti-Semitism"], dated January 15, 2004; The Nation, February 2, 2004 issue.
- "Joffe's flight of fantasy", Foreign Policy, March/April 2005.
- "Israel, Antisemitism and the left", Red Pepper, November 24, 2005.
- "The other Balfour: recalling the 1905 Aliens Act" in S. W. Massil (ed.), Jewish Year Book, London: Vallentine Mitchell, 2005.
- with Robert S. Wistrich, "Correspondence between Prof. Robert Wistrich and Brian Klug: When Is Opposition to Israel and Its Policies Anti-Semitic?", International Center for the Study of Anti-Semitism, Hebrew University of Jerusalem.
- "In search of clarity", Catalyst, March 17, 2006.
- "A contradiction in 'the new Europe'" in M. Bunzl, Anti-Semitism and Islamophobia: Hatreds Old and New in Europe, Chicago: Prickly Paradigm Press, 2007.
- "The state of Zionism", dated May 31, 2007; The Nation, June 18, 2007 issue.
- "Die Sicht auf Israel als 'Jude der Welt'" in Bunzl and Senfft (eds.), Zwischen Antisemitismus und Islamophobie, Hamburg: VSA-Verlag, 2008.
- "Tricks of memory: Auschwitz and the question of Palestinian terrorism" in Stephen Law (ed.), Israel, Palestine and Terror, London: Continuum, 2008.
- "A plea for distinctions: disentangling anti-Americanism and anti-semitism", Think (Royal Institute of Philosophy), Winter 2008.
- "A people apart?", Jewish Quarterly, Spring 2011.

== See also ==
- New antisemitism
