= Een Ander Joods Geluid =

Dutch-Jewish organisation

Een Ander Joods Geluid (Eng: "A Different Jewish Voice") (EAJG) is a Dutch-Jewish organisation founded in May 2001 to promote public debate concerning Israel in the Netherlands. It wants to break the perceived silence in the Dutch-Jewish community concerning the occupation of the Palestinian Territories by Israel, and strives to support peace activities in this same area. The organisation is chaired by Jaap Hamburger. Other prominent figures involved with EAJG include Hedy d'Ancona, Ed van Thijn, Dieuwertje Blok, Felix Rottenberg, and Hanneke Groenteman.

== History ==
The origins of Een Ander Joods Geluid were in October 2000, after a group of Dutch Jews published several ads in national newspapers and the Nieuw Israëlitisch Weekblad (New Israelite Weekly, the biggest Jewish newspaper in the Netherlands) criticising Israeli policy in the occupied Palestinian territories. The organisation was founded in May 2001 by Anneke Mouthaan (a peace activist) and Harry de Winter, a producer and television host, and co-operates with SIVMO (Support Committee Israeli Peacegroups and Human Rights Organisations).

The founding of the organisation received some criticism from figures within the Jewish community, who have accused the group of antisemitism and wanting to dismantle the state of Israel.

Following the outbreak of the Gaza war in 2023, Een Ander Joods Geluid has been active in pro-Palestinian demonstrations, including the Red Line demonstrations in 2025. In 2026, EAJG was one of several groups urging Rotterdam mayor Carola Schouten to retract an invitation for the Israeli ambassador to attend a memorial service for victims of the Holocaust.

== Aims ==
The underlying goal of Een Ander Joods Geluid is that it should be possible for Jews to criticise the actions of Israel, its initial declaration of principles called for the withdrawal of Israeli troops and settlements from the occupied Palestinian territories, the establishment of a Palestinian state as part of a two-state solution with Jerusalem as a shared capital and a "balanced solution" to the issue of Palestinian refugees.

== See also ==
- Independent Australian Jewish Voices
- Independent Jewish Voices (Canada)
- Independent Jewish Voices (UK)
- Jewish Voice for Peace (US)
