= Patterns of Prejudice =

Multidisciplinary academic journal

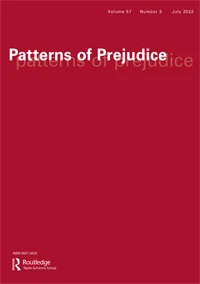
- Discipline: Humanities, Jewish studies, social sciences
- Language: English
- Edited by: Tony Kushner, Barbara Rosenbaum, Dan Stone

Publication details
- History: 1967-present
- Publisher: Taylor & Francis on behalf of the Parkes Institute for the Study of Jewish/non-Jewish Relations at the University of Southampton (United Kingdom)
- Frequency: Quarterly

Standard abbreviations
- ISO 4: Patterns Prejud.

Indexing
- ISSN: 0031-322X (print); 1461-7331 (web)
- OCLC no.: 757286608

Links
- Journal homepage; Online access

Patterns of Prejudice is a peer-reviewed, multidisciplinary academic journal dedicated to the study of historical and contemporary discrimination, intolerance, and social exclusion. Published by Taylor & Francis on behalf of the Parkes Institute for the Study of Jewish/non-Jewish Relations at the University of Southampton, the articles are selected via a double-blind method, and publications are issued five times a year. The journal was founded in 1967 to study "racial and religious prejudice" throughout the world and report on contemporary political events.

== See also ==
- American Jewish Committee
- Institute for Jewish Policy Research
- Sociology of race and ethnic relations
