= Estonia–Israel relations =

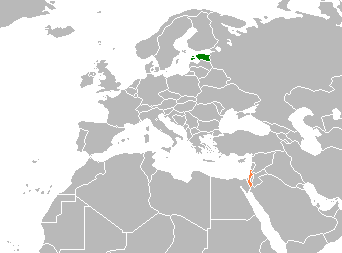
- Estonia: Israel

Estonia–Israel relations are foreign relations between Estonia and Israel.

Israel recognized Estonia on 4 September 1991 and diplomatic relations were established on 9 January 1992. The Estonian embassy in Israel was opened in November 2009 by the Estonian Minister of Foreign Affairs Urmas Paet. The Israeli ambassador to Finland serves also as the ambassador to Estonia. Israel also has an honorary consul in Tallinn, Estonia. Estonian nationals and Israeli nationals can visit each other without visa.

== History ==
After the collapse of the Soviet Union and Estonia restored its independence, Israel was among the first nations to recognize Estonia's independence in 1991.

On 16 November 2000, Estonia and Israel signed an agreement on the abolition of the visa requirement for holders of diplomatic, service and ordinary passports, which entered into force on 7 October 2001.

Estonia adopted the IHRA definition of antisemitism and Estonia was one of the countries to boycott the Durban IV Conference in 2021.

After the 7 October massacres of Israelis by Hamas in 2023, the Estonian parliament condemned the massacre with 78 votes in favor and none opposed. The Estonian police arrested five people who allegedly distributed antisemitic and pro-Hamas leaflets in Tallinn on 7 November. In 2024, Estonia suspended funding to UNRWA due to allegations that it was linked to Hamas.

On 21 November 2024, the International Criminal Court (ICC) issued arrest warrants for two senior Israeli officials, Benjamin Netanyahu, the Prime Minister of Israel, and Yoav Gallant, the former Minister of Defense of Israel, on suspicion of committing a genocide against Palestinians in the Gaza Strip. Foreign Minister Margus Tsahkna acknowledged the arrest warrants and Estonia's obligations as a state party to the ICC, but also voiced scepticism that the order would contribute to "a lasting peace in the Middle East."

== Economic and trade relations ==
On 13 March 1994 Estonia and Israel signed a protection on investment agreement which entered into force on 22 May 1995, and on 29 June 2009 Estonia and Israel signed an avidness double taxation agreement which entered into force on 31 December 2009.

=== Trade ===
Israel and Estonia trade is also influenced by the EU - Israel Free Trade Agreement from 1995.

Estonia - Israel trade in millions USD-$
| | Israel imports Estonia exports | Estonia imports Israel exports | Total trade value |
|---|---|---|---|
| 2023 | 64.1 | 16.9 | 81 |
| 2022 | 69.4 | 12.6 | 82 |
| 2021 | 64.3 | 17.3 | 81.6 |
| 2020 | 72.3 | 8.7 | 81 |
| 2019 | 87 | 9.7 | 96.7 |
| 2018 | 66.6 | 12 | 78.6 |
| 2017 | 56.9 | 9.2 | 66.1 |
| 2016 | 52.2 | 9.7 | 61.9 |
| 2015 | 58.2 | 11.6 | 69.8 |
| 2014 | 89.9 | 16.9 | 106.8 |
| 2013 | 69.6 | 17.7 | 87.3 |
| 2012 | 48.3 | 15.9 | 64.2 |
| 2011 | 56.4 | 13.5 | 69.9 |
| 2010 | 46.1 | 10.3 | 56.4 |
| 2009 | 35.8 | 7.6 | 43.4 |
| 2008 | 46.2 | 13.7 | 59.9 |
| 2007 | 26.3 | 16.6 | 42.9 |
| 2006 | 22.2 | 13.9 | 36.1 |
| 2005 | 23.4 | 8.8 | 32.2 |
| 2004 | 25.1 | 4 | 29.1 |
| 2003 | 16.1 | 5.2 | 21.3 |
| 2002 | 15.6 | 1.9 | 17.5 |

The Israeli defense industry is popular among the Estonian military, especially after the Russian invasion of Ukraine in 2022. In 2019, Estonia bought the Israeli Rafael-made Spike LR missiles, anti-tank guided missiles, for €40 million. In 2023, Estonia ordered from the Israel Aerospace Industries in a 100M€ deal. In September 2023, Israel delivered Estonia 1000 new Negev NG7 light machine guns of the Israel Weapon Industries (IWI). In 2024, Estonia received the Blue Spear, an Israeli and Singaporean mobile anti-ship missile system.

== Cultural, educational, and scientific relations ==
On 12 July 1993 Estonia and Israel signed an agreement on cultural, educational, and scientific cooperation which was entered into force on 4 August 1998.

Since 2014, MustonenFest Tallinn – Tel Aviv which was founded by Andres Mustonen is taking place every year and has become a major annual cultural exchange event for both Estonia and Israel. The MustonenFest mostly focus on classical, jazz and world music.

In December 2024 the Estonian Academy of Arts (EKA) decided to cut ties with Shenkar College in Israel, a decision which was criticized and made the rector of the Estonian Academy of Arts review the decision.

== Visits ==
Visits of officials
| Year | Visit | Note |
|---|---|---|
| November 2001 | The Israeli Minister of National Infrastructures Avigdor Lieberman visit Estonia | |
| November 2004 | The Estonian prime minister Juhan Parts visit Israel | The first Estonian prime minister to visit Israel |
| September 2005 | The Israeli President President Moshe Katzav visit Estonia | The first Israeli president to visit Estonia |
| January 2007 | The Estonian Minister of Foreign Affairs Urmas Paet visits Israel | |
| May 2007 | Jona Metzger the Chief Rabbi of Israel, and Shimon Peres the Deputy Prime Minister of Israel visit Estonia, regarding the opening of the Tallinn synagogue. (Two months before Shimon Peres became the president of Israel) | |
| November 2009 | The Estonian Minister of Foreign Affairs Urmas Paet visits Israel | |
| June 2010 | The Estonian President Toomas Hendrik Ilves visit Israel | The first Estonian president to visit Israel |
| August 2010 | The Israeli Minister Michael Eitan visit Estonia | |
| December 2010 | Delegation of the Foreign Affairs Committee of the Riigikogu visit Israel | |
| May 2011 | The Israeli Deputy Minister of Foreign Affairs Daniel Ayalon visit Estonia | |
| November 2012 | The Estonian Minister of Culture Rein Lang visit Israel | |
| December 2012 | The Estonian Prime Minister Andrus Ansip visit Israel | |
| September 2013 | Rina Frenkel, Chairperson of the Knesset Estonian Friendship Group visit Estonia | |
| November 2013 | The Estonian Minister of Agriculture Helir-Valdor Seeder visit Israel | |
| May 2014 | Knesset delegation led by Deputy Speaker Gila Gamliel visit Estonia | |
| January 2016 | The Estonian Minister of Foreign Affairs Marina Kaljurand visit Israel | |
| January 2017 | The Knesset speaker Yuli-Yoel Edelstein visit Estonia | |
| March 2017 | The Estonian Minister of Foreign Affairs Sven Mikser visit Israel | |
| May 2017 | The Israeli Minister for Social Equality Gila Gamliel visit Estonia | |
| June 2017 | The Estonian Minister of Foreign Affairs Sven Mikser visit Israel | |
| October 2017 | The Estonian Minister of Entrepreneurship and Information Technology Urve Palo visit Israel | |
| May 2018 | The Estonian Minister of Education and Research Mailis Reps visit Israel | |
| June 2018 | The Estonian Minister of Justice Urmas Reinsalu visit Israel | |
| November 2018 | The President of the Riigikogu Eiki Nestor visit Israel | |
| November 2018 | The Estonian Minister of Entrepreneurship and Information Technology Rene Tammist visit Israel | |
| June 2019 | The Estonian Minister of the Interior Mart Helme visit Israel | |
| April 2022 | The Estonian Minister of Entrepreneurship and Information Technology Andres Sutt visit Israel | |
| May 2022 | The Estonian Minister of Foreign Affairs Eva Maria Liimets visit Israel | |
| November 2022 | The Israeli Minister of Culture and Sports Hili Tropper visit Estonia | |

== Jewish community ==
Tallinn Synagogue

In 1939, there were about 4,500 Jews living in Estonia, mostly in Tallinn. Other communities existed in Tartu, Valga, Pärnu, Narva, Viljandi, Rakvere, Võru, and Nõmme. According to the World Jewish Congress in 2023, there are almost 2,000 Jews living in Estonia. In 1990, the Jewish School in Tallinn was re-opened. In 2007, a new synagogue was opened in Tallinn. In 2008, the Estonian Jewish Museum was opened.

== See also ==
- Foreign relations of Estonia
- Foreign relations of Israel
