= History of the Jews in Belarus =

Belarusian Jews יהודי בלארוס Беларускія габрэі
- The location of Belarus (green) in Europe

Regions with significant populations
- Belarus: 13,705 (2019) - 70,000 (2014)
- Israel: 78,859 Belarusian immigrants to Israel (in the years 1989-2013)

Languages
- Hebrew, Russian, Yiddish, Polish and Belarusian

Religion
- Judaism, Atheism

Related ethnic groups
- Jews, Ashkenazi Jews, Sephardi Jews, Mizrahi Jews, Russian Jews, Ukrainian Jews, Lithuanian Jews, Polish Jews, Belarusians

The history of the Jews in Belarus begins as early as the 8th century. Jews lived in all parts of the lands of modern Belarus. In 1897, the Jewish population of Belarus reached 910,900, or 14.2% of the total population. Following the Polish-Soviet War (1919-1920), under the terms of the Treaty of Riga, Belarus was split into Eastern Belorussia (under Soviet occupation) and Western Belorussia (under Polish occupation), and causing 350,000-450,000 of the Jews to be governed by Poland. Prior to World War II, Jews were the third largest ethnic group in Belarus and comprised more than 40% of the urban population. The population of cities such as Minsk, Pinsk, Mogilev, Babruysk, Vitebsk, and Gomel was more than 50% Jewish. In 1926 and 1939 there were between 375,000 and 407,000 Jews in Belarus (Eastern Belorussia) or 6.7-8.2% of the total population. Following the Soviet annexation of Eastern Poland in 1939, including Western Belorussia, Belarus would again have 1,175,000 Jews within its borders, including 275,000 Jews from Poland, Ukraine, and elsewhere. It is estimated that up to 800,000 of 900,000 — up to 90% of the Jews of Belarus —were killed during the Holocaust. According to the 2019 Belarusian census, there were 13,705 self-identifying Jews in Belarus, of which most are of Ashkenazi origin. However, the Israeli embassy in Belarus claims to know about 30-50 thousand Belarusians with Jewish descent (as of 2017).

== Early history ==
Throughout several centuries the lands of modern-day Belarus were a part of the Grand Duchy of Lithuania. Therefore, the history of Belarusian Jews is closely related to the history of Jews in Lithuania and historically they could be seen as a subset of Lithuanian Jews.

As early as the 8th century Jews lived in parts of the lands of modern Belarus. Beginning with that period they conducted the trade between Ruthenia, Lithuania, and the Baltic, especially with Danzig, Julin (Vineta or Wollin, in Pomerania), and other cities on the Vistula, Oder, and Elbe.

The origin of Belarusian Jews has been the subject of much speculation. It is believed that they were made up of two distinct streams of Jewish immigration. The older and significantly smaller of the two entered the territory that would later become the Grand Duchy of Lithuania from the east. These early immigrants spoke Judeo-Slavic dialects which distinguished them from the later Jewish immigrants who entered the region from the Germanic lands.

While the origin of these eastern Jews is not certain, historical evidence places Jewish refugees from Babylonia, Palestine, the Byzantine Empire and other Jewish refugees and settlers in the lands between the Baltic and Black Seas that would become part of the Grand Duchy of Lithuania. The later and much larger stream of immigration originated in the 12th century and received an impetus from the persecution of the German Jews by the Crusaders. The traditional language of the vast majority of Lithuanian Jews, Yiddish, is based largely upon the Medieval German and Hebrew spoken by the western Germanic Jewish immigrants.

The peculiar conditions that prevailed in Belarus compelled the first Jewish settlers to adopt a different mode of life from that followed by their western ethnic brethren. At that time there were no cities in the western sense of the word in Belarus, no Magdeburg Rights or close guilds at that time.

== Increasing prosperity and the great charter (1320–1432) ==
With the campaign of Grand Duke Gediminas of Lithuania and his subjection of Kiev and Volhynia (1320–1321) the Jewish inhabitants of these territories were induced to spread throughout the northern provinces of the Grand Duchy of Lithuania. The probable importance of the southern Jews in the development of Belarus and Lithuania is indicated by their numerical prominence in Volhynia in the 13th century. According to an annalist who describes the funeral of the grand duke Vladimir Vasilkovich in the city of Vladimir (Volhynia), "the Jews wept at his funeral as at the fall of Jerusalem, or when being led into the Babylonian captivity." This sympathy and the record thereof would seem to indicate that long before the event in question, the Jews had enjoyed considerable prosperity and influence, and this gave them a certain standing under the new régime. They took an active part in the development of the new cities under the tolerant rule of Grand Duke Gediminas.

Little is known of the fortunes of the Belarusian Jews during the troublous times that followed the death of Gediminas and the accession of his grandson, Grand Duke Vytautas the Great (1341). To the latter, the Jews owed a charter of privileges which was momentous in the subsequent history of the Jews of Belarus and Lithuania. The documents granting privileges first to the Jews of Brest (July 1, 1388) and later to those of Hrodna, Trakai (1389), Lutsk, Vladimir, and other large towns are the earliest documents to recognize the Jews of the Grand Duchy of Lithuania as possessing a distinct organization.

The gathering together of the scattered Jewish settlers in sufficient numbers and with enough power to form such an organization and to obtain privileges from their Lithuanian rulers implies the lapse of considerable time. The Jews who dwelt in smaller towns and villages were not in need of such privileges at this time, and the mode of life, as Abraham Harkavy suggests, "the comparative poverty, and the ignorance of Jewish learning among the Lithuanian Jews retarded their intercommunal organization." But powerful forces hastened this organization toward the close of the 14th century. The chief of these was probably the cooperation of the Jews of Poland with their brethren in the GDL. After the death of Casimir III (1370), the condition of the Polish Jews changed for the worse. The influence of the Roman Catholic clergy at the Polish court grew; Louis of Anjou was indifferent to the welfare of his subjects, and his eagerness to convert the Jews to Christianity, together with the increased Jewish immigration from Germany, caused the Polish Jews to become apprehensive for their future.

== Jagiellon rule ==
In 1569, the Kingdom of Poland and the Grand Duchy of Lithuania were united. It was generally a time of prosperity and relative safety for the Jews of both countries (with the exception of the Chmielnicki Uprising in the 17th century). However, a few events, such as the expulsion of the Jews from Lithuania between 1495 and 1503 occurred just within the Grand Duchy.

== Jewish culture in Belarus ==
=== Items from the Responsa ===
The responsa sheds an interesting light also on the life of the Lithuanian Jews and on their relations to their Christian neighbors. Benjamin Slonik states in his Mas'at Binyamin (end of sixteenth and beginning of 17th century) that "the Christians borrow clothes and jewelry from the Jews when they go to church." Joel Sirkis (l.c. § 79) relates that a Christian woman came to the rabbi and expressed her regret at having been unable to save the Jew Shlioma from drowning. A number of Christians had looked on indifferently while the drowning Jew was struggling in the water. They were upbraided and beaten severely by the priest, who appeared a few minutes later, for having failed to rescue the Jew.

Solomon Luria gives an account (Responsa, § 20) of a quarrel that occurred in a Lithuanian community concerning a cantor whom some of the members wished to dismiss. The synagogue was closed in order to prevent him from exercising his functions, and religious services were thus discontinued for several days. The matter was thereupon carried to the local lord, who ordered the reopening of the building, saying that the house of God might not be closed, and that the cantor's claims should be decided by the learned rabbis of Lithuania. Joseph Katz mentions (She'erit Yosef, § 70) a Jewish community which was forbidden by the local authorities to kill cattle and to sell meat—an occupation which provided a livelihood for a large portion of the Lithuanian Jews. For the period of a year following this prohibition the Jewish community was on several occasions assessed at the rate of three gulden per head of cattle in order to furnish funds with which to induce the officials to grant a hearing of the case. The Jews finally reached an agreement with the town magistrates under which they were to pay forty gulden annually for the right to slaughter cattle. According to Hillel ben Naphtali Herz (Bet Hillel, Yoreh De'ah, § 157), Naphtali says the Jews of Vilna had been compelled to uncover when taking an oath in court, but later purchased from the tribunal the privilege to swear with covered head, a practise subsequently made unnecessary by a decision of one of their rabbis to the effect that an oath might be taken with uncovered head.

The responsa of Meir Lublin show (§ 40) that the Lithuanian communities frequently aided the German and the Austrian Jews. On the expulsion of the Jews from Silesia, when the Jewish inhabitants of Silz had the privilege of remaining on condition that they would pay the sum of 2,000 gulden, the Lithuanian communities contributed one-fifth of the amount.

== Belarusian Jews under the Russian Empire ==
Historical Belarusian Jewish population
Year	Pop.	±%
1815	200,000	—
1850	500,000	+150.0%
1897	910,900	+82.2%
1926	407,069	−55.3%
1939	375,092	−7.9%
1959	150,090	−60.0%
1970	148,027	−1.4%
1979	135,539	−8.4%
1989	112,031	−17.3%
1999	27,798	−75.2%
2009	12,926	−53.5%
2019	13,705	+6.0%
Source: Yivoencyclopedia.org; Demoscope.ru; Jewishdatabank.org; AJCarchives.org; Pop-stat.mashke.org; The Jewish population data includes Mountain Jews, Georgian Jews, Bukharan Jews (or Central Asian Jews), Krymchaks (all per the 1959 Soviet census), and Tats.; 2019 Belarus Census; Sloin, Andrew (2017) The Jewish Revolution in Belorussia p.252

The Russian empire began to rule over the modern day territory of Belarus following the 1st Partition of Poland in 1772, with their rule gradually expanding over all of Belarus during the 2nd and 3rd Partitions of Poland. This annexation, as well as Belarusians' incorporation into the Pale of Settlement, brought a relegation of Belarusian Jews as second-class citizens. Though despite this Belarusian Jewish Shtetls were mostly autonomous and the Jews of Belarus were mostly spared from the many pogroms which befell the Jews of the Russian Empire.

The Belarusian Jews were at this point, and still are a primarily urban demographic within Belarus.

Belarus was a relatively unimportant and uninfluential area of the jewish world during this era; while it was renowned for its yeshivot in Minsk, Mir, and Volozhin it was overshadowed by Vilnius the so called "Jerusalem of Lithuania". Similarly, while the urban centers of Belarus were early centers of the Haskalah they were overshadowed by other cities like Lviv, St. Petersburg, Vilnius, and Odessa. Belarus was unique though as an early hotspot of Hasidic Judaism.

By the end of the 19th century, many Belarusian Jews were part of the general flight of Jews from Eastern Europe to the New World due to conflicts and pogroms engulfing the Russian Empire and the anti-Semitism of the Russian czars. Millions of Jews, including tens of thousands of Jews from Belarus, emigrated to the United States of America and South Africa. A small number also emigrated to the British Mandate of Palestine.

In fall of 1897, a branch of the General Jewish Labour Bund founded a branch on Minsk, the next of year a group mostly made up of Bundist Socialists founded the Russian Social Democratic Labour Party. By the start of the 1900's, the area would become a hotbed of Jewish Socialist politics, including the zionist Poale Zion. The two biggest Socialist parties; Poale Zion and The Bund were similar in many ways: they both gathered their support primarily from cities, particularly Minsk; they both focused on Yiddish as a revolutionary language as opposed to Hebrew, which was viewed as a Bourgeoisie language. But the differences occur in their locations of interest, as while The Bund focused on Jews within the diaspora, Poale Zion always maintained a Zionist position.

== Soviet Union pre-1941 ==
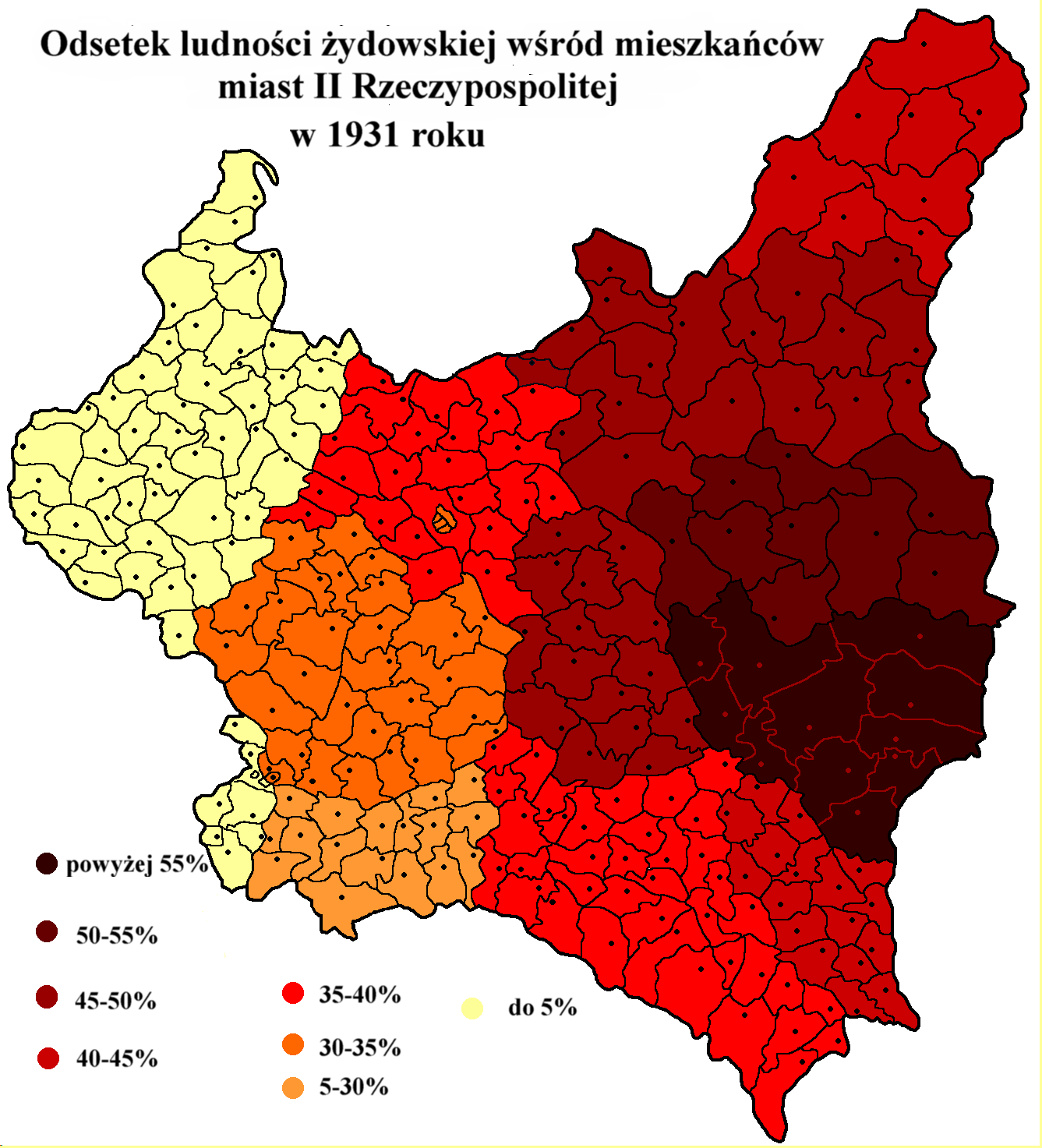
Percentage of the Ashkenazi Jews in the cities of the Second Polish Republic in 1931 (the territory that today occupies the Brest Oblast had the highest percentage).

Jewish political organizations, including the General Jewish Labour Bund, participated in the creation of the Belarusian People's Republic in 1918.

The Polish-Soviet War was a major factor in the development of an alliance between the Communists and the Belarusian Jews. The expansive and fluid nature of the war brought a massive amount of devastation for the many small unprotected communities of the area; and as the Polish Army advanced they brought with them a massive wave of pogroms, with the most notorious being the 1919 Pinsk Massacre. But most of the violence wasn't committed by the Polish Army but instead by bands of partisans nominally allied with the Polish. These atrocities fed into Soviet recruitment efforts and led to many Jews being radicalized into Communism and/or joining the Red Army.

The Soviet Unions' early ambitions during its claim to Belarus included a nationwide effort to abolish racism and animosity between ethnic groups. As part of this effort, the Soviets banned Antisemitic speech and action. The parties goal at this time was the assimilation of the Jews and to eliminate Antisemitism as part of a wider project of phasing out the remnants of Capitalism, uniting the country under absolute Socialism.

While this effort partially worked; fears over lack of resources, no social mobility, poverty, and other issues led to a slow rise in intra-national animosity, particularly Antisemitism. The previous Soviet attempts to mute Antisemitism, however, also made it an unspeakable topic, meaning discussion of class and wealth in the 1920's often became proxies for discussion of ethnicity and race. This outlawing also made it harder for Soviet authorities to directly handle the problem.

During the period of the New Economic Policy (1921-1928), Judaism in Belarus struggled under the weight of frequent economic struggles as the constant economic crises of the era led to several policies which particularly hurt Belarusian Jews. Even though many in the Communist government stressed the need for Jewish inclusion and modernization, many Jews were relegated to lower-class positions in society. At this time, Belarusian Jews most commonly worked in Light Industry which was disproportionately targeted by the Soviets for increases in productivity, leading to Jews being in the majority figures of Soviet working-class movements opposed to the New Economic Policy. This in turn, resulted in them being targeted further by programs intended to vilify those against the policy.

During the first years of Soviet power in Belarus, in the 1920s, Yiddish was an official language in East Belarus along with Belarusian, Polish and Russian. Yakov Gamarnik, a Ukrainian Jew, was First Secretary of the Communist Party of Belorussia (i.e. the de facto head of state) from December 1928 to October 1929. However, the Soviet policy later turned against the Jews (see Stalin's antisemitism).

This period also saw a conflict over the culture Judaism which saw an attempt to make Jewish culture fit with the new revolutionary ideology and saw characters from popular Jewish culture such as Bontshe Shvayg turned into revolutionary propaganda pieces, with mixed success and reception.

== World War II ==
Atrocities against the Jewish population in the German-conquered areas began almost immediately, with the dispatch of Einsatzgruppen (task groups) to round up Jews and shoot them. Local anti-semites were encouraged to carry out their own pogroms. By the end of 1941, there were more than 5,000 troops devoted to rounding up and killing Jews. The gradual industrialization of killing led to adoption of the Final Solution and the establishment of the Operation Reinhard extermination camps: the machinery of the Holocaust. Of the Soviet Jews who were killed in the Holocaust, 246,000 Jews were Belarusian: some 66% of the total number of Belarusian Jews.

== Late 20th century to modern days ==
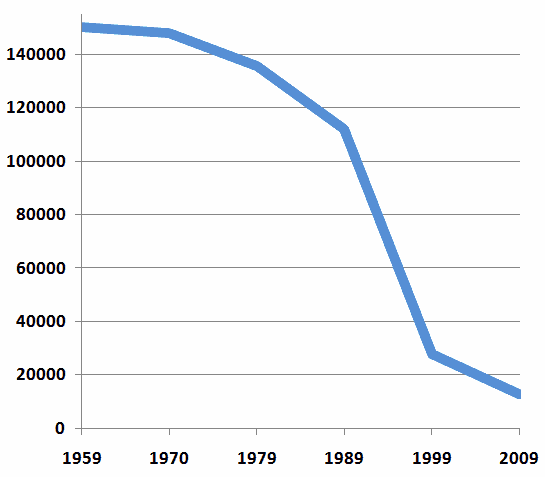
Jewish population in Belarus (official census data)

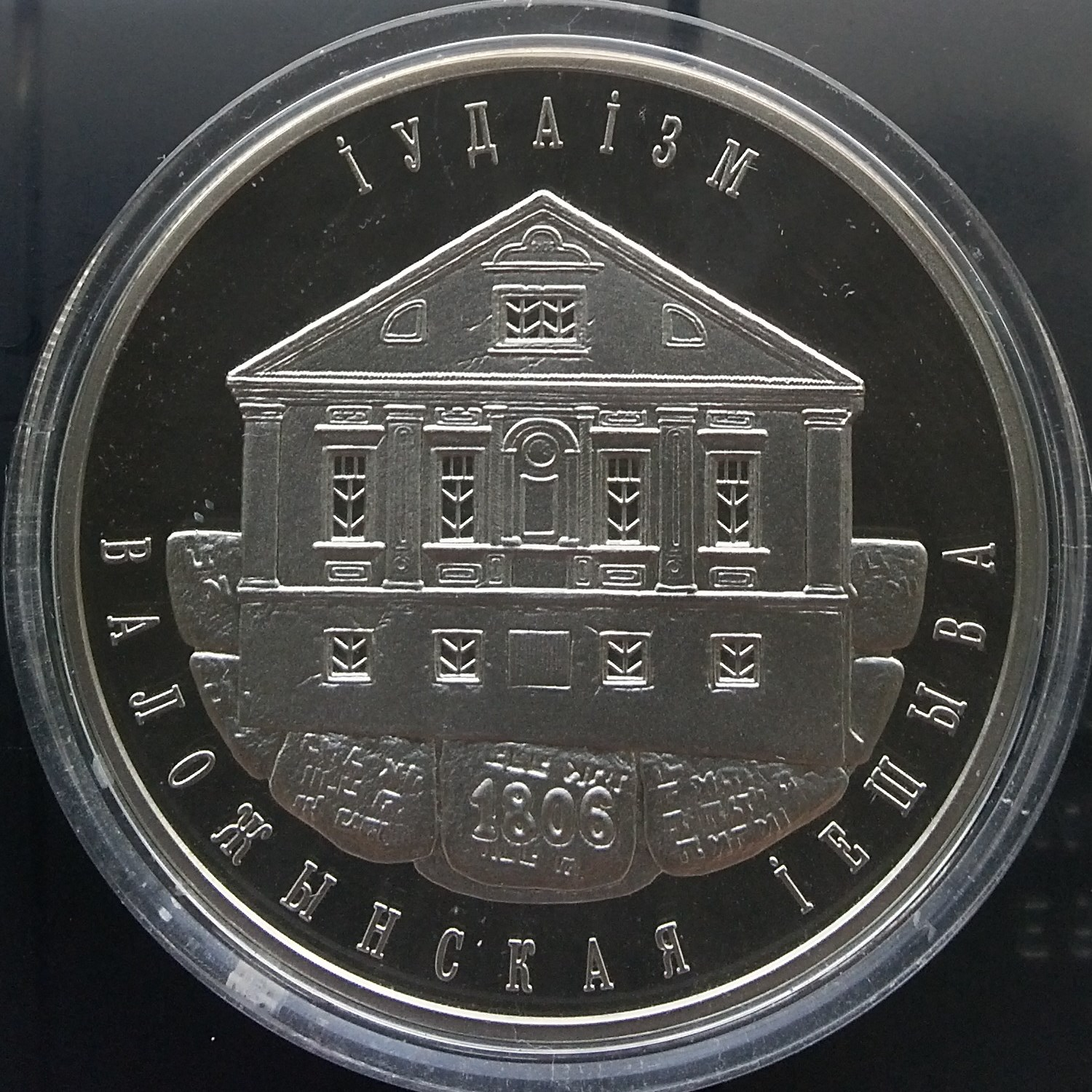
Silver coin of Belarus, 10 rubles, 2010, 925, diam. 33 mm, revers, Volozhin yeshiva

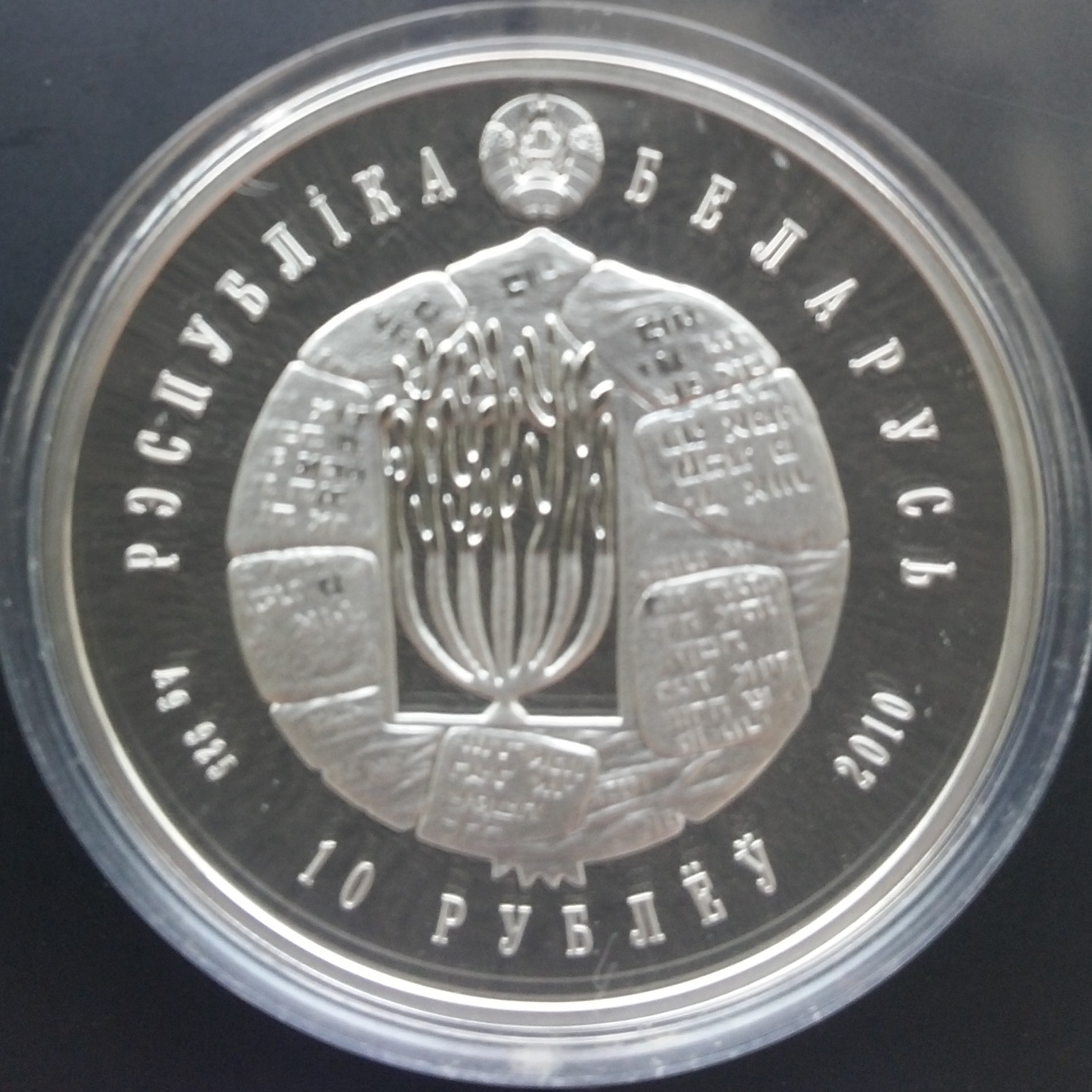
Silver coin of Belarus, 10 rubles, 2010, 925, diam. 33 mm, avers, "Judaism"

In 1968, several thousand Jewish youths were arrested for Zionist activity. In the second half of the 20th century, there was a large wave of Belarusian Jews during the 1970s Soviet Union aliyah, as well as to the United States. In 1979, there were 135,400 Jews in Belarus; a decade later, 112,000 were left. The collapse of the Soviet Union and Belarusian independence saw most of the community, along with most of the former Soviet Union's Jewish population, lead to the 1990s post-Soviet aliyah.

The 1999 census estimated that there were only 27,798 Jews left in the country, which further declined to 12,926 in 2009 and marginally rose to 13,705 in 2019, although oddly in that year, 10,269 men but only 3,436 women identified as Jewish. However, local Jewish organizations put the number at 50,000 in 2006. About half of the country's Jews live in Minsk. National Jewish organizations, local cultural groups, religious schools, charitable organizations, and organizations for war veterans and Holocaust survivors have been formed.

Since the mass immigration of the 1990s, there has been some continuous immigration to Israel. In 2002, 974 Belarusians moved to Israel, and between 2003 and 2005, 4,854 followed suit.

In October 2007, Belarusian president Alexander Lukashenko, known for his authoritarian rule, was accused of making antisemitic comments; addressing the "miserable state of the city of Babruysk" on a live broadcast on state radio, he stated: "This is a Jewish city, and the Jews are not concerned for the place they live in. They have turned Babruysk into a pigsty. Look at Israel — I was there and saw it myself... I call on Jews who have money to come back to Babruysk." Members of the United States House of Representatives sent a letter to the Belarusian ambassador to the US, Mikhail Khvostov, addressing Lukashenko's comments with a strong request to retract them, and the comments also caused an adverse reaction from Israel. From having made up about half of the city's population in 1939, in 1999 there were only about 1000 Jews left in Babruysk.

Following the Belarusian protests in 2020 and 2021, Jewish immigration from Belarus increased by 69 percent.

After Belarus joined the Russian invasion of Ukraine, Jewish immigration from Belarus increased by 229 percent by 2023.

== See also ==
- List of Belarusian Jews
- Timeline of Jewish history in Lithuania and Belarus
- History of the Jews in Poland
- Lithuanian Jews
- History of the Jews during World War II
- Gavriil of Belostok, case of blood libel in Belarusian lands
- Hasidic Judaism
- Belarus–Israel relations
