= Jüdische Stimme für gerechten Frieden in Nahost =

Jüdische Stimme's logo

Jewish Voice for a Just Peace in the Middle East – EJJP Germany e. V. (German: Jüdische Stimme für gerechten Frieden in Nahost, often abbreviated Jüdische Stimme) was founded in 2003 to promote a settlement to the Israeli–Palestinian conflict that respects human rights and international law. In particular, it advocates the end of military occupation, colonialism, apartheid, and the blockade of the Gaza Strip. Jüdische Stimme is one of the highest-profile pro-Palestinian/anti-Zionist groups in Germany. It is the German section of the European umbrella group European Jews for a Just Peace.

In 2019 it was awarded the Göttingen Peace Prize, a decision criticized by the Central Council of Jews in Germany.

Jewish activists with the group, including Adam Broomberg, have been arrested at pro-Palestinian protests. Jüdische Stimme also had its bank accounts repeatedly frozen amid accusations that it supports Boycott, Divestment, and Sanctions (BDS) and "demonizes and delegitimizes the Israeli state in particular". In its 2024 annual report, the Federal Office for the Protection of the Constitution classified it as a "secular pro-Palestinian extremist" organization. Jewish Voice filed a lawsuit against the Federal Republic of Germany and the Berlin Administrative Court ruled, that the Federal Office had to remove this classification from its 2024 annual report. In 2026 the Cologne Administrative Court, taking the 2023 October 7 attacks into regard, saw a "glorification and approval of Hamas actions" by the "Jüdische Stimme" activists and allowed the classification as an "extremist" organisation by the Federal Office for the Protection of the Constitution.
