= Belarus–Israel relations =

- Belarus: Israel

Belarus and Israel established diplomatic relations in 1992. In 1947, Belarus (then known as the Byelorussian SSR) voted in favor for the United Nations Partition Plan for Palestine. Belarus operates an embassy in Tel Aviv, while Israel operates an embassy in Minsk. Around 130,000 Belarusian citizens immigrated to Israel during the 1990s under the Law of Return.

== History ==
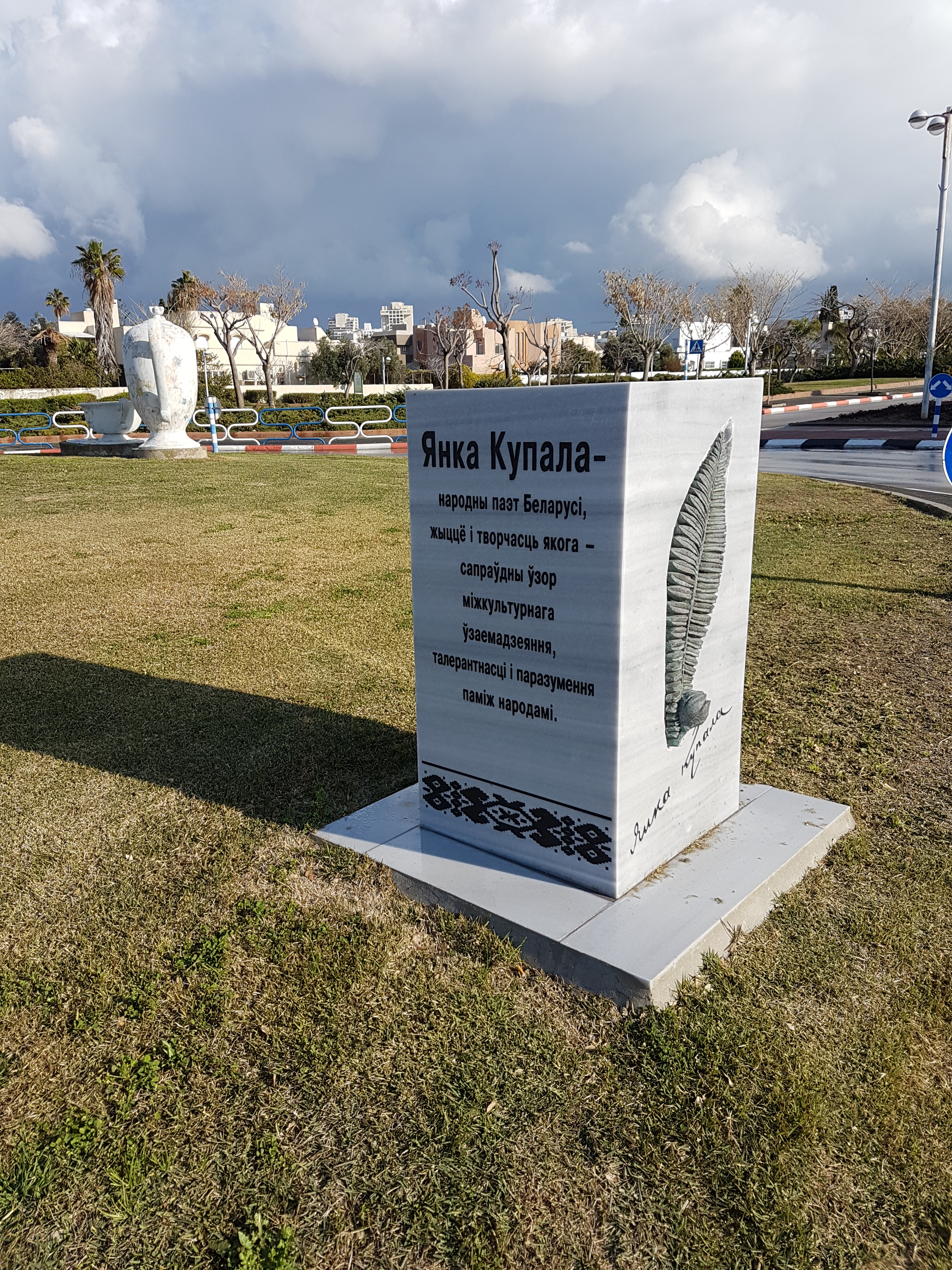
Memorial sign for Yanka Kupala in Israeli city of Ashdod

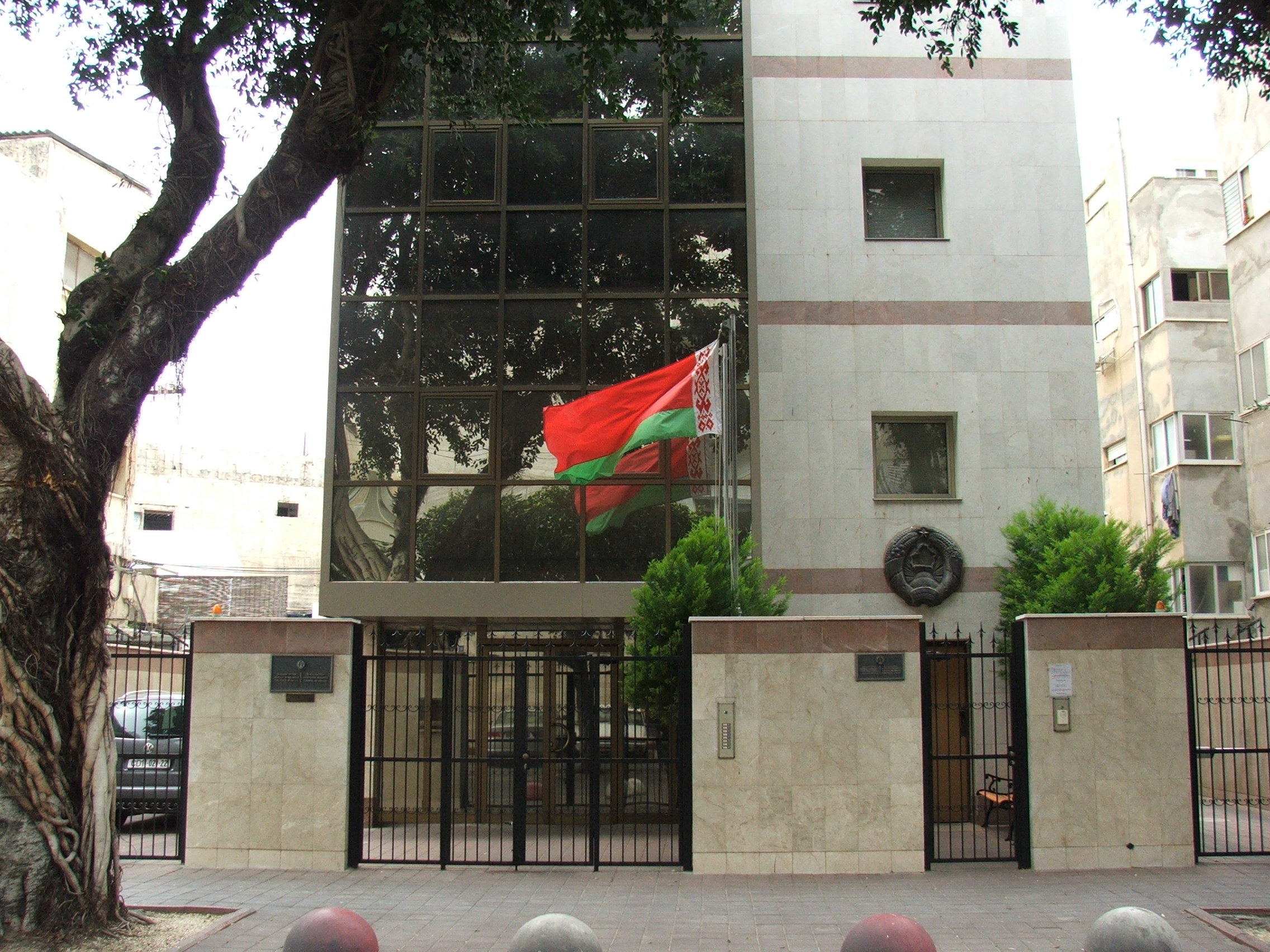
The Embassy of Belarus in Israel

=== Jewish communities ===
Jews have been living in Belarus for more than six centuries and are an integral part of the ethnic structure of the Belarusian society. The first and the third President of the State of Israel, Chaim Weizmann and Zalman Shazar, Prime Ministers Menachem Begin, Yitzhak Shamir, Shimon Peres, who served as prime minister and president, one of the pioneers of the revival of the Hebrew language Eliezer Ben-Yehuda, the artist Marc Chagall and many other famous Jewish figures, were born in what is today Belarus. On the territory of the BSSR during the Second World War, about 800,000 Jews were killed. At the moment, 676 Belarusians have been recognized as - Righteous Among the Nations, who hid Jews during the war.

Nowadays about 130,000 immigrants from Belarus live in Israel. The number of Jews living in Belarus is considered to be around 30–50,000. However, the number of Belarusians with Jewish descent is assumed to be higher.

=== The Great Aliyah ===
During the 1990s, around 130,000 Belarusian citizens made aliyah to Israel.

=== Present day ===
In November 2022, Belarus was one of 52 countries that abstained on a United Nations General Assembly resolution requesting an International Court of Justice opinion on Israeli occupation of the Palestinian territories.

Following the Gaza war, the Belarusian government called for restraint and dialogue by both parties. President Alexander Lukashenko criticized claims that Russia and Belarus had benefited from the situation through attention shifting away from the Russo-Ukrainian War, instead suggesting that the United States was the beneficiary of the conflict, and stated that Israeli Prime Minister Benjamin Netanyahu had been the "target of attacks for months and years" in domestic Israeli politics. He warned against further escalation, describing it as a "dangerous situation". Lukashenko also asked for further evidence of Iranian involvement in the Hamas attack against Israel, suggesting instead that weapons provided by the U.S. to Ukraine were being used by Hamas.

In November 2023, the Belarusian foreign ministry expressed its desire to restore direct flights to Israel, noting good relations between the two countries based on "closely intertwined human destinies and cultures".

== Visa-free travel ==
In September 2014, an agreement was signed on visa-free entry. The agreement will facilitate travel Israelis who wish to visit their relatives and friends in Belarus, as well as tourism between the countries.

== Start-ups ==
A number of Israeli startups have established operations in Belarus. An example was the Tel Aviv startup Viber, which was outsourced largely to Belarus before its $900 million sale to Japan's Rakuten.

== Cultural exchange ==
Israel operates an Israeli cultural centre in Minsk. High-school exchange programmes have been established between Israel and Belarus.

The Days of Israeli Culture festival has been held in Belarus, and The Days of Belarusian Culture in Israel. A photo exhibition in Tel Aviv, "Belarus and Israel: 25 Years of Friendship and Partnership", was held to celebrate the 25th anniversary of relations.

== Tourism ==
Israeli tourists are the eighth largest tourist nationality visiting Belarus. Israeli citizens are interested in Belarus's tourist attractions, recreation facilities, places of worship, monuments dating back to the Second World War, and also places related to more than six centuries of Belarusians and Jews living together.

== Industrial projects and scientific agreements ==
Joint industrial projects include the creation of the Belarusian-Israeli agro-industrial park, to be completed by 2020. A number of joint projects in the field of agriculture are successfully implemented with the participation of Israeli capital and technology in Belarus in recent years.

The joint Belarusian-Israeli Committee for Trade and Economic Cooperation is headed by Alexander Popkov and Sofa Landver.

In May 2018, Belarus' State Science and Technology Committee and Israel's Ministry of Science, Technology and Space concluded an agreement on cooperation in science and technology. The parties will set up a joint working group on cooperation in science and technology.

== Intergovernmental agreements ==
In April 2000, Israel and Belarus signed an agreement on avoidance of double taxation and an agreement on the promotion and mutual protection of investments. In October 2000, an agreement on trade and economic cooperation between the two countries was signed.

The following intergovernmental agreements have been signed between Israel and Belarus:

- On the establishment of diplomatic relations,
- On trade and economic cooperation,
- On the promotion and mutual protection of investments,
- On the avoidance of double taxation and the prevention of tax evasion with respect to taxes on income and capital,
- On cooperation in the field of agriculture and processing industry,
- On cooperation in the field of air transport,
- On cooperation in combating crime,
- On cooperation in the field of education, science and culture,
- On the mutual establishment and operation of cultural centers,
- On cooperation in the field of tourism,
- On cooperation in the field of standardisation, meteorology and conformity assessment,
- On cooperation in the field of health and medicine.

In July 2002 and December 2006 in Minsk, two rounds of Belarusian-Israeli consultations were held between the Foreign Ministry at the level of deputy foreign ministers.

== High level visits ==
Guest	Host	Place of visit	Date of visit	Notes
(Belarus) Prime Minister Vyacheslav Kebich	(Israel) Prime Minister Yitzhak Rabin	Tel Aviv	1992	
(Belarus) President Alexander Lukashenko	(Israel) President Ezer Weizman	Tel Aviv	January 5–7, 2000	He attended ceremonies in honor of the 2000th anniversary of Christianity.
(Israel) Foreign Minister Avigdor Lieberman		Minsk	2009	
(Belarus) Prime Minister Mikhail Myasnikovich		Tel Aviv	June 7–9, 2011	

- In February 2012, a delegation of Belarusian parliamentarians visited Israeli counterparts, gifting the National Library of Israel with 21 volumes of books printed by Belarusian printer Francysk Skaryna.
- On May 15–17, 2012, Deputy Prime Minister of the Republic of Belarus Mikhail Rusy visited Israel for participation in the Agritech International Agrarian Technologies Exhibition.

== Regional partnerships ==
Agreements on cooperation between the cities of Vitebsk and Rishon Lezion (March 2008), as well as between the cities of Hlybokaye and Kiryat Bialik (May 2011) have been signed.

On February 21, 2011, in Israel, the mayor of Grodno, Boris Kozelkov, and the mayor of Ashkelon, Benny Vaknin, signed an agreement on the establishment of sister-city ties between Grodno and Ashkelon.

On March 28, 2012, in Israel, the mayor of Brest, Alexander Polyshenkov, and the mayor of Ashdod, Yehiel Lasri, signed an agreement on establishing twin-city relations between Brest and Ashdod.

== Resident diplomatic missions ==
- Belarus has an embassy in Tel Aviv.
- Israel has an embassy in Minsk.

== See also ==
- Foreign relations of Belarus
- Foreign relations of Israel
- History of the Jews in Belarus
