= Independent Australian Jewish Voices =

Former Australian Jewish organisation

Independent Australian Jewish Voices (IAJV) was an Australian Jewish advocacy organisation launched in 2007. It recognised Israel's right to exist, but also believed that Palestinians' right to a homeland is legitimate and needs to be acknowledged. IAJV appears to have become defunct in 2017.

== History ==
Prominent British Jews, including actor Stephen Fry and playwright Harold Pinter, had previously spoken out against the Jewish establishment in the UK for supporting Israel above the human rights of Palestinians. They formed the group Independent Jewish Voices, saying that the existing groups did not represent their views. There was also a similar group in Germany called Schalom 5767, which had attracted 7,000 signatures in support.

Independent Australian Jewish Voices (IAJV) was established on 5 March 2007, co-founded by journalist and writer Antony Loewenstein, with the support of 120 prominent Jewish Australians. They included academics, politicians, and publishers, including ethicist Peter Singer, publisher Louise Adler, and Eva Cox, of the Women's Electoral Lobby.

The IAJV was mentioned in the press in January 2009, when it coordinated a statement condemning Israel's siege of Gaza.

Its final website posts were published in early 2017. The organisation appears to be defunct after this. Antony Loewenstein became a committee member of the Jewish Council of Australia in 2024.

== Description ==
IAJV believed that Israel has a right to exist, but also that Palestinians' right to a homeland should be recognised. It strove for peace in the Middle East.

== See also ==
- Een Ander Joods Geluid (Netherlands)
- Independent Jewish Voices (Canada)
- Independent Jewish Voices (UK)
- Jewish Voice for Peace (US)
