= Independent Jewish Voices =

British Jewish organisation

- Formation: 2007
- Website: ijv.org.uk

Independent Jewish Voices (IJV) is an organization launched on 5 February 2007 by 150 prominent British Jews including Nobel laureate Harold Pinter, historian Eric Hobsbawm, lawyer Sir Geoffrey Bindman, Lady Ellen Dahrendorf, film director Mike Leigh, and actors Stephen Fry and Zoë Wanamaker. The organization is reportedly "born out of a frustration with the widespread misconception that the Jews of this country speak with one voice—and that this voice supports the Israeli government's policies". IJV stated it was founded "to represent British Jews ... in response to a perceived pro-Israeli bias in existing Jewish bodies in the UK", and, according to Hobsbawn, "as a counter-balance to the uncritical support for Israeli policies by established bodies such as the Board of Deputies of British Jews".

== Declaration ==
The group's Declaration states:

We are a group of Jews in Britain from diverse backgrounds, occupations and affiliations who have in common a strong commitment to social justice and universal human rights. We come together in the belief that the broad spectrum of opinion among the Jewish population of this country is not reflected by those institutions which claim authority to represent the Jewish community as a whole. We further believe that individuals and groups within all communities should feel free to express their views on any issue of public concern without incurring accusations of disloyalty.

We have therefore resolved to promote the expression of alternative Jewish voices, particularly in respect of the grave situation in the Middle East, which threatens the future of both Israelis and Palestinians as well as the stability of the whole region.

Its signatories attest to being guided by five principles presented in the Declaration:

1. Human rights are universal and indivisible and should be upheld without exception. This is as applicable in Israel and the occupied Palestinian territories as it is elsewhere.
2. Palestinians and Israelis alike have the right to peace and security.
3. Peace and stability require the willingness of all parties to the conflict to comply with international law.
4. There is no justification for any form of racism, including anti-Semitism, anti-Arab racism or Islamophobia, in any circumstance.
5. The battle against anti-Semitism is vital and is undermined whenever opposition to Israeli government policies is automatically branded as anti-Semitic.

Signatories to the Declaration state their shared beliefs that "the interests of an occupying power should not count for more than the human rights of an occupied people" and that "the Palestinian inhabitants of the West Bank and the Gaza Strip face appalling living conditions with desperately little hope for the future"; they pledge their "support for a properly negotiated peace between the Israeli and Palestinian people and oppose any attempt by the Israeli government to impose its own solutions on the Palestinians".

=== Signatories ===
Signatories include Lisa Appignanesi, Sir Geoffrey Bindman, Gerald Cohen, Stanley Cohen, Lady Ellen Dahrendorf, Jenny Diski, Nicole Farhi, Stephen Fry, Alexander Goehr, Eric Hobsbawm, Ann Jungman, Anne Karpf, Beeban Kidron, Brian Klug, David Lan, Mike Leigh, Steven Lukes, Shula Marks, Mike Marqusee, Adam Phillips, Harold Pinter, Nigel Rodley, Jacqueline Rose, Leon Rosselson, Andrew Samuels, Richard Sennett, Avi Shlaim, Gillian Slovo, Shawn Slovo, Janet Suzman, Zoë Wanamaker, Sami Zubaida and David Feldman.

== Responses ==
According to Amiram Barkat, in his article "U.K. Board of Deputies Rejects Criticism from New Jewish Group", published in Haaretz, a spokesperson for the Board of Deputies of British Jews has responded to the IJV's launching: "If Brian Klug and the other signatories to IJV chose to engage with the institutions of the Jewish community, rather than shouting from the sidelines, they may find that most Jews disagree with much of what they say, but, in the spirit of Talmudic disputation, they would be no less welcome for that".

== "End the siege of Gaza!" ==
In early 2008, 250 members of Independent Jewish Voices signed a statement entitled "End the siege of Gaza!", which was printed as a full-page advertisement in The Times. The statement called on Israel to lift its economic blockade while condemning both collective punishment against the people of Gaza and Palestinian rocket attacks into Israel, and encouraging both sides to observe a cease-fire.

== See also ==
- Blockade of the Gaza Strip
- Een Ander Joods Geluid (Netherlands)
- Jewish Voice for Peace (US)
- Independent Australian Jewish Voices
- Independent Jewish Voices Canada
- Israeli–Palestinian conflict
- Palestine: Peace Not Apartheid
- Euston Manifesto
- 'Progressive' Jewish Thought and the New Anti-Semitism

== Further reading and related resources ==
- Barkat, Amiram. "U.K. Board of Deputies Rejects Criticism from New Jewish Group." Haaretz 7 February 2007. Retrieved 8 February 2007.
- Goodman, Amy. "Independent Jewish Voices: New British Group Speaks Out on Israeli Policies in Occupied Territories." Interview with Sir Geoffrey Bindman and Susie Orbach. Rush Transcript. Democracy Now! 9 February 2007. Retrieved 9 February 2007. (Streaming audio and MP3 links.)
- Klug, Brian. "Who Speaks for Jews in Britain?" Guardian Online, Comment is free (blog) 5 February 2007. Retrieved 8 February 2007. (Incl. link to "a full list of articles in the Independent Jewish Voices debate.")
- "Press coverage of IJV Launch."
- Introduction of IJV and partly translation of declaration in German.
