= Independent Jewish Voices Canada =

Advocacy organization

- Abbreviation: IJV
- Formation: 2008
- Type: Advocacy organization
- Location: Canada
- Official languages: English; French
- National coordinator: Corey Balsam
- Chair: Sara Rans
- Website: ijvcanada.org

Independent Jewish Voices Canada (IJV; French: Voix juives indépendantes, VJI) is a Canadian Jewish advocacy organization. The organization was founded in 2008 as a result of a national conference called on behalf of the Alliance of Concerned Jewish Canadians.

== Positions ==
IJV asks that Israeli policies comply with international law and follow international conventions on human rights. This includes withdrawing from land Israel occupied after the Six-Day War in 1967, respecting the universal right of refugees to return to their homes or receive compensation, dismantling the Separation Wall and Israeli settlements on the West Bank and Golan Heights, and correcting laws and practices within Israel that discriminate against the rights of non-Jews.

IJV has not adopted a position on the question of a one-state versus a two-state solution, but believes it is crucial for Israelis and Palestinians to have fully equal rights in any solution.

=== Criticism of the Canadian Jewish Congress ===
IJV has been highly critical of the Canadian Jewish Congress (CJC), now reorganized as the Centre for Israel and Jewish Affairs (CIJA). In an interview with the Kelowna Daily Courier, Sid Shniad of IJV accused the CJC of "playing the anti-Semitic card ... because they don't have a lot else. They want to intimidate; they want to shut (the debate) down. They want people to avert their eyes when it comes to the ongoing crisis there to allow them to do what they have been doing." He further added that the CJC is "playing a losing game. They're placing themselves on the wrong side of the issue of free speech. It can't be won. You don't win people's hearts and minds by telling them to shut up and go away." He also stated that it was "outrageous" that Bernie Farber, CEO of the CJC, attended a conference of the United Church of Canada (UCC) "to try to shut down this debate".

Conversely, the Canadian Jewish Congress has often criticized IJV. Bernie Farber, chief executive of the CJC, stated that "no one ever says Israel is perfect" and predicted the fledgling group will have trouble finding support. Farber stated that the alliance "will remain a rump on the edge of Jewish society." In January 2010, Farber described IJV as a "fringe group" that spews "vile, anti-Zionist" rhetoric.

=== Criticism of Canadian government ===
In 2010, Canada's bid for a seat on the UN Security Council failed and Prime Minister Stephen Harper blamed it on "a rising tide of antisemitism". Diana Ralph of IJV denied that the criticism of Israeli policies was antisemitic and stated, "We believe that it is legitimate and ethically necessary for Canadians of conscience to criticize Israeli human rights abuses and to support non-violent remedies." In response, Melanie Phillips, writing in The Spectator, described Independent Jewish Voices as "those obnoxious Finklers ... part of that broader coalition of hatred which should surely be called Jews for Injustice Against Jews".

IJV opposed the appointment of Vivian Bercovici as Canadian ambassador to Israel in 2014, calling her an "apologist for Israel's crimes".

=== Other ===
IJV has also spoken out against Canadian Hillel chapters denying members the right to hold open discussions of Israel.

In May 2014, IJV called on the Canadian government to deny entry of Moshe Feiglin, Deputy Minister of the Israeli Knesset, because of his allegedly racist views. According to IJV spokesperson Sheryl Nestel, these include "support for the transfer to neighbouring Arab states of the 1.4 million Palestinians who are citizens of Israel. Feiglin is also an advocate of annexing the West Bank and the Gaza strip and of the exercise of full Israeli sovereignty over Jerusalem, both of which are in direct contravention of international law."

== Activism ==
=== Support for BDS ===
In June 2009, IJV became the first Canadian Jewish organization to join an international campaign in support of the call for Boycott, Divestment and Sanctions (BDS) against Israel. IJV stated that it will:

Support the Palestinian call for a campaign of boycott, divestment and sanctions until Israel meets its obligation to recognize the Palestinian people's right to self-determination and complies with the precepts of international law, including the right of Palestinian refugees to return to their homes and properties as stipulated in UN resolution 194.

IJV has promoted the boycott of SodaStream, a company selling water carbonation devices manufactured in the occupied West Bank.

In 2012, the United Church of Canada decided to boycott goods produced in illegal Israeli settlements in the West Bank and East Jerusalem. The Church was accused of bias and antisemitism. IJV spokesperson Tyler Levitan defended the Church's campaign in a public statement, saying that "The Israel lobby, unable to defend Israel's occupation and brutal treatment of the Palestinian people, can only slur those who support Palestinian human rights."

In 2014, IJV widened its BDS initiatives to include Block the Boat, a campaign to cause financial loss to the Israeli Zim Integrated Shipping Services company by blocking its ships from unloading.

=== Countering pro-Israel advocacy ===
In an article written for the Winnipeg Free Press and reprinted widely since, IJV member Jason Kunin wrote that "pro-Israel advocacy depends upon on the active dissemination of Islamophobia. Not surprisingly, engendering hatred in this manner inflames anti-Jewish sentiment among Arabs and Muslims. None of this is a recipe for making Jews safe" and that "Defenders of Israel often argue that Israel is forced to do what it does—to destroy people's homes, to keep them under the boot of occupation, to seal them into walled ghettos, to brutalize them daily with military incursions and random checkpoints—to protect its citizens from Palestinian violence."

In an interview with the Ryerson Free Press in July 2009, then IJV co-chair Diana Ralph expressed confidence that "progressive Jews in alliance with other pro-justice groups had the potential to build a movement powerful enough to expose, weaken and eventually defeat the Canadian Israel lobby." Ralph also claimed that "in spite of heavy pro-Israel propaganda, most Jews are far more progressive than the Israel lobby which claims to speak for them."

=== 2008–09 and 2014 Gaza wars ===
IJV opposed the Gaza War of 2008–09. In a press release issued at the beginning of the conflict, the group stated that:

Independent Jewish Voices (Canada) condemns this murderous escalation of violence by the Israeli government. Diana Ralph, IJV Coordinator calls this assault "completely disproportionate to the unsupportable firing of Qassam rockets by Hamas fighters which killed one Israeli. It’s important to put this into the context of the deadly siege of Gaza by the Israeli forces, which continued in violation of the terms of the recent six month truce between Israel and Gaza. In the ethics of violent conflicts, it is the responsibility of the force wielding power – the Israeli government in this case – to create the conditions for a just peace."

IJV participated in the Code Pink delegation which brought humanitarian relief to the territory in May 2009.

IJV was again moved to outrage and action in 2014 by the Israeli bombing and invasion of Gaza, and what they saw as the support of Israel's actions by Stephen Harper and other national parties. "The Liberal party is in lockstep with the Conservatives in not even mentioning Palestinian casualties and the NDP won't mention the word Palestine", said Tyler Levitan of IJV. IJV organized and joined protests across Canada.

=== Opposition to the Jewish National Fund ===
IJV has criticized the Jewish National Fund (JNF) for "discriminatory policies of ethnic exclusion, and its role in the historic and ongoing dispossession of Palestinians from their lands." IJV has mounted a campaign in conjunction with other organizations to have the charitable status of the JNF's Canadian branch revoked.

Members of IJV and others disrupted an event put on by JNF Canada in Toronto in September 2014.

=== Definition of antisemitism ===
In 2020, IJV published a definition of antisemitism which states that: "antisemitism is not an exceptional form of bigotry. People who hate, discriminate and/or attack Jews, will also hate, discriminate and/or attack other protected groups—including racialized people, Muslims, LGBTQ2+, women, Indigenous peoples."

== History ==
=== First national conference ===
The Alliance of Concerned Jewish Canadians and other activists held a national Independent Jewish Canadians Conference on 28–30 March 2008 with Naomi Klein as its keynote speaker. The participants affirmed their support for international law, their opposition to all forms or racism (including antisemitism and Islamophobia), and pledged to counter the view that any criticism of Israel's government and military policies is automatically antisemitic. Specifically, they opposed the Israeli occupation of the West Bank and Gaza which commenced in 1967.

The conference passed a resolution creating an interim steering committee that would found a national progressive Jewish organization. The steering committee adopted the name Independent Jewish Voices (Canada) shortly afterwards. ACJC co-founder Eibie Weizfeld split with the new group and continues to lead an organization called ACJC which is unconnected with IJV.

The seven stated goals of IJV are:

1. To give Jewish Canadians an alternative that works for peace and justice
2. To challenge the Jewish establishment's views on the Middle East
3. To open up discussion about Israeli government and military actions
4. To support the right of Canadians to discuss Israeli policies without fear of being accused of anti-Semitism
5. To promote contacts with Muslims and Arabs in Canada and to demonstrate that we can work together for peace
6. To oppose wars of aggression
7. To work in solidarity with the peace movements and war resisters within Israel

IJV has been criticized because the ACJC accepted a $900 donation from the United Church of Canada to help defray travel costs of IJV's founding conference. The donation amounted to 10% of the conference's costs. Bernie Farber of the Canadian Jewish Congress denounced the donation claiming that it was "'shocking, outrageous, shameful and scandalous ... [t]hat a mainstream Christian faith group would provide funding to create an anti-Zionist, and anti-Jewish group is absolutely astounding'".

=== Controversies ===
In 2009, a minor controversy ensued when the National Post publicized former IJV co-ordinator Diana Ralph's contribution of a chapter to The Hidden History of 9-11, in which she wrote that the attacks of 11 September 2001, were being used by the United States government as a pretext to "seize control of Eurasia, and thereby the entire world." She also wrote that "It is difficult to draw another conclusion than that Bush's associates organized the 9/11 attacks to kick-start popular support for this war" and that "The 'war on terror' is a concept modelled on Israel's assaults on Palestinians to provide a cover for campaigns of territorial conquest."

Howard Davidson, a member of the IJV steering committee, stated that Ralph's past has "nothing to do with the IJV" and that "The positions of Diana Ralph stated in those articles do not represent the positions of the IJV."

Shortly after the National Post article, Ralph stepped down as IJV's co-ordinator. She wrote a rebuttal to the allegations directed at her.

In February 2015, IJV linked to an article by anti-Zionist writer Alan Hart on its official Facebook and Twitter accounts. The link was to a version of the article that had been reposted on the far-right website Veterans Today, with an editor's note that contested the numbers of Jews that were killed in the Holocaust. B'nai Brith Canada accused IJV of thereby promoting Holocaust denial. IJV apologized, condemning the charge of Holocaust denial, and writing that they had been careless in not examining the editor's note and the Veterans Today website.

== See also ==
- Een Ander Joods Geluid (Netherlands)
- Independent Australian Jewish Voices
- Independent Jewish Voices (UK)
- Jewish Voice for Peace (US)
