= List of pro‑Palestinian advocacy organizations =

A list of notable Pro-Palestinian solidarity organizations.

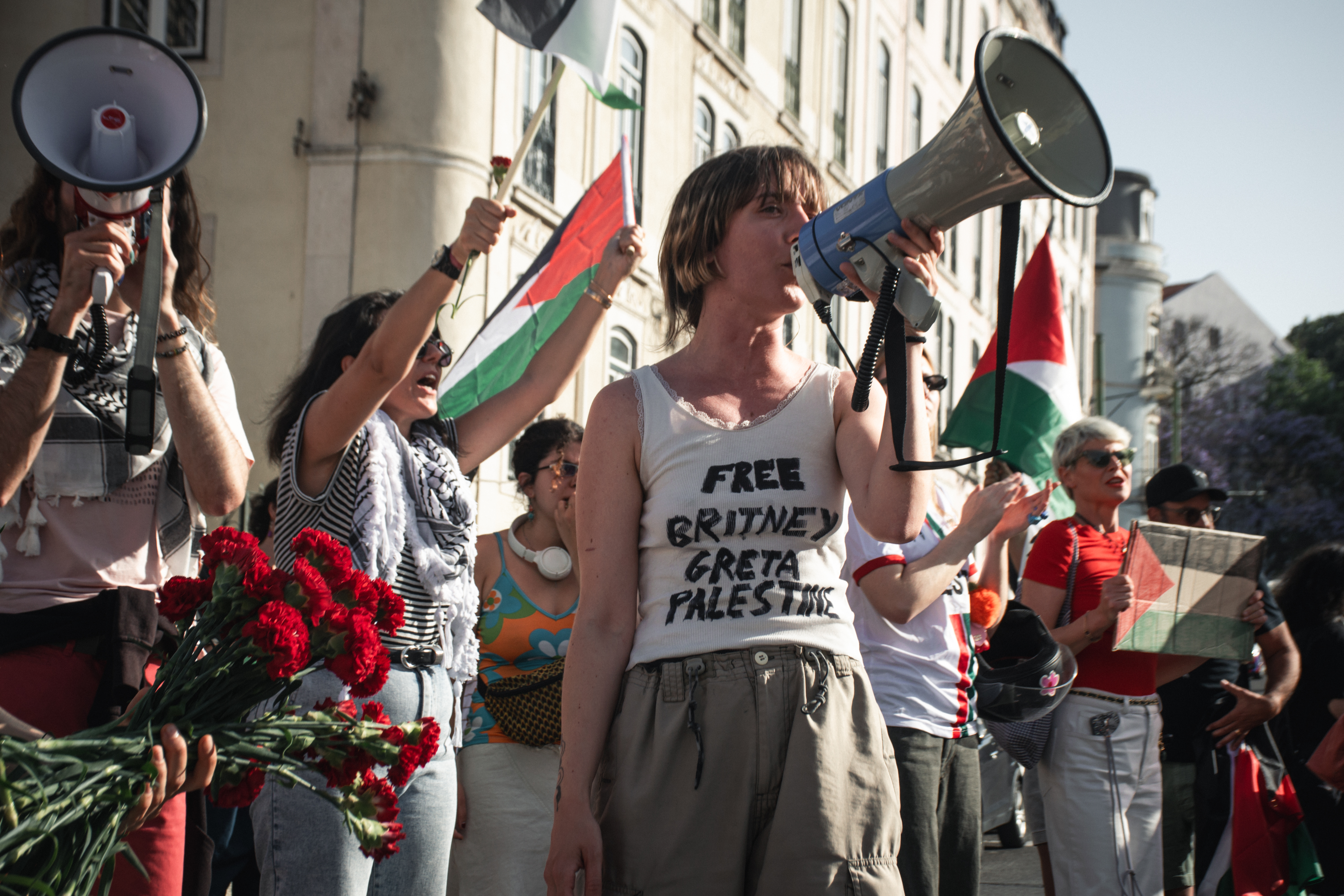
Free Britney, Free Greta, Free Palestine – Freedom Flotilla demonstration in Lisbon

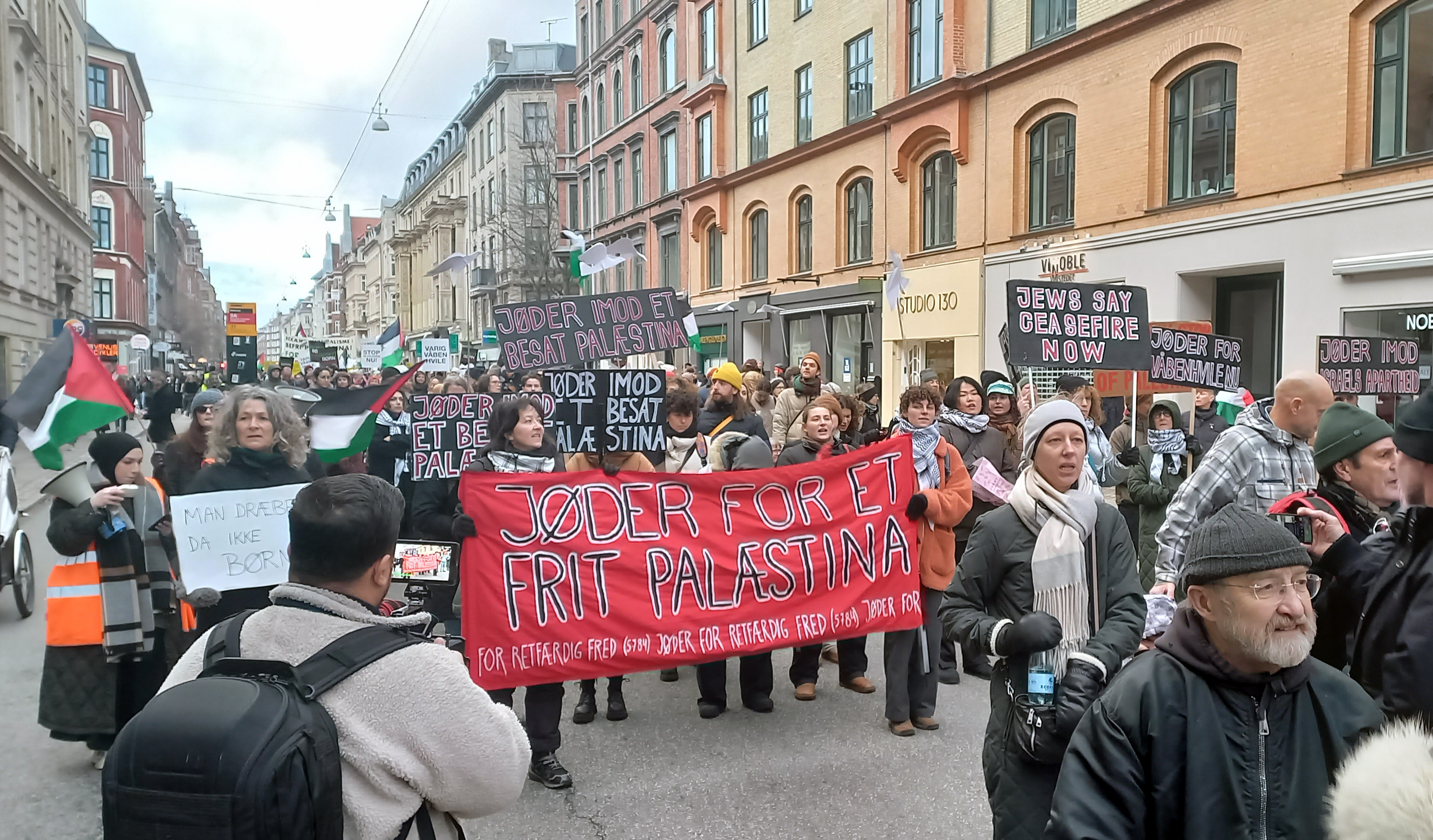
Jews for a Just Peace (Jøder for Retfærdig Fred) demonstrators with banners saying "Jews for a free Palestine", "Jews against an occupied Palestine", "Jews for ceasefire now", and "Jews against Israel's apartheid" during a protest march against the war on Gaza in Copenhagen, Denmark, February 02, 2024.

== Current and active ==
- American Muslims for Palestine (AMP) in the United States
- Anarchists Against the Wall in Israel
- Boycott, Divestment, Sanctions (BDS) Movement (International)
- Breaking the Silence in Israel
- B'Tselem in Israel (human rights organization documenting violations in the Israeli-occupied Palestinian territories)
- Canadians for Justice and Peace in the Middle East in Canada
- Combatants for Peace in Israel and the Palestinian territories
- Committee for Charity and Support for the Palestinians in France
- Defence for Children International – Palestine in the Palestinian territories
- Een Ander Joods Geluid in the Netherlands
- Faculty for Justice in Palestine in the United States (network of faculty and staff groups)
- Freedom Flotilla Coalition (International)
- Gush Shalom in Israel (peace and anti-occupation movement)
- HaMoked in Israel (human rights organization providing legal assistance to Palestinians)
- IfNotNow in the United States
- Independent Jewish Voices in the United Kingdom and Canada
- Institute for Middle East Understanding in the United States
- International Centre of Justice for Palestinians in the United Kingdom and Canada
- International Jewish Anti-Zionist Network in the United States
- International Solidarity Movement (ISM) in the Palestinian territories/International
- Ireland Palestine Solidarity Campaign in Ireland
- Israeli Committee Against House Demolitions in Israel (opposes the demolition of Palestinian homes)
- Jewdas in the United Kingdom
- Jewish Council of Australia in Australia
- Jewish Voice for Peace in the United States
- Jews for Israeli–Palestinian Peace in Sweden
- Jews for Justice for Palestinians in the United Kingdom
- Jüdische Stimme für gerechten Frieden in Nahost in Germany
- Judaism On Our Own Terms in the United Kingdom
- Machsom Watch in Israel
- Medical Aid for Palestinians in the United Kingdom (advocates for Palestinians' right to health)
- NORWAC in Norway (humanitarian organization providing medical aid to Palestinians)
- Palestine Action in the United Kingdom
- Palestine Solidarity Campaign in the United Kingdom
- Palestine Solidarity Movement in the United States (student organization)
- Palestinian Centre for Human Rights in the Palestinian territories
- Palestinian NGOs Network in the Palestinian territories (umbrella organization of Palestinian NGOs)
- Palestinian Return Centre in the United Kingdom (advocates for the right of return for Palestinian refugees)
- Palestinian Youth Movement in the Palestinian territories/International
- Physicians for Human Rights–Israel in Israel
- Rabbis for Human Rights in Israel and the Palestinian territories
- Scottish Palestine Solidarity Campaign in Scotland
- Standing Together in Israel (Jewish-Arab grassroots movement advocating equality, peace, and an end to the occupation)
- Students for Justice in Palestine (SJP) in the United States/Canada
- Ta'ayush in Israel (Jewish-Arab partnership supporting Palestinian communities)
- Tech for Palestine (International; technology advocacy initiative)
- Union des progressistes juifs de Belgique in Belgium
- Union of Palestinian Women's Committees in the Palestinian territories
- Unity of Fields in the United States
- Within Our Lifetime in New York City, United States
- Writers Against the War on Gaza in the United States
- Yesh Din in Israel
- Zochrot in Israel (promotes awareness of the Nakba and the Palestinian right of return)

== See also ==
- Anti-Zionism – Opposition to Zionism
- Jewish pro-Palestinian activism – Jewish support for Palestinian rights
- Black-Palestinian solidarity – Political solidarity between Palestinian and Black people
- Palestine exception – Restrictions on pro-Palestine speech
- From the river to the sea – Political phrase related to the Palestine region
- Gaza genocide – Ongoing genocide in the Gaza Strip
- Gaza war protests – Protests beginning in 2023
- Gaza war protests in the United States – Protests relating to the Gaza war
- University of Oxford pro-Palestinian campus occupations
- Gaza Freedom Flotilla – Humanitarian aid convoys to Palestine
- Columbia University Apartheid Divest – Coalition of student groups at Columbia University
