= Yellow Brick Road (disambiguation) =

Yellow brick road is the road of yellow brick in Frank L. Baum's novel The Wizard of Oz

Yellow Brick Road or yellow brick road may also refer to:

== Music ==
- Goodbye Yellow Brick Road, an album by Elton John
  - "Goodbye Yellow Brick Road" (song), a song from the album
  - Follow the Yellow Brick Road Tour, a 2014 tour promoting the re-release of the album
  - Farewell Yellow Brick Road, the final tour by Elton John from 2018 to 2023, named after the album
- Up The Yellow Brick Road, an album by Salsoul Orchestra
- Yellow Brick Road, an album by Sabrina Starke
- "Yellow Brick Road", a song by Angus & Julia Stone from the album Down the Way
- "Yellow Brick Road", a song by Captain Beefheart from the album Safe as Milk
- "Yellow Brick Road", a song by Eminem from Encore
- "Yellow Brick Road", a song by Raine Maida from the album The Hunters Lullaby
- "The Yellow Brick Road Song", a song by Iyeoka Okoawo

== Film ==
- YellowBrickRoad, a 2010 horror film

== See also ==
- Walking Together on the Yellow Brick Road, an official audio drama for the anime series The Big O, written by Chiaki J. Konaka
- Follow the Yellow Brick Road
- Yellow Brick Road Casino
- Yellow brick road (mathematics)
