= Referendums in Israel =

Referendums in Israel have never been held although a 2014 Basic Law provides for a national referendum or a two-thirds Knesset majority (80 members out of 120) prior to any territorial withdrawal has been enacted, For the law to pass in Israel, it must be approved in three separate readings.

The law was enacted in the context of peace talks with Syria, which wants Israel to withdraw from the Golan Heights based on the "land for peace" formula. The Golan Heights were occupied by Israel during the 1967 Six-Day War and were unilaterally annexed in 1981. Because many Israelis oppose a retreat from the Golan Heights, several Knesset members wanted to ensure that any proposal to withdraw from the area would be "approved by the people, without outside considerations, tricks or political bribes" and so they adopted the referendum law.

Israel already has another law mandating a referendum before it can cede any territory under Israeli sovereignty, but the law also states that it would not apply until a Basic Law detailing the procedures for holding a referendum is passed. Originally, the Knesset enacted a law that eliminates the need to enact a Basic Law. However, a High Court of Justice ruling, the referendum-enabling law, which requires territorial concessions to be approved by a national referendum, general elections or a majority of 80 Knesset members, became formally readopted as a Basic Law.

The holding of a referendum has been proposed several times over the course of Israel's history, but none of the proposals has ever succeeded. David Ben-Gurion proposed a referendum on the introduction of a majoritarian electoral system in 1958 to reduce the influence of the National Religious Party. Menachem Begin proposed the introduction of a legislative initiative, which would have allowed 100,000 citizens to demand that a proposed law be submitted to a referendum. The referendum was also briefly discussed in the 1970s, when a plebiscite over the future of the West Bank was considered.

More recently, a referendum was proposed in 2005 when Prime minister Ariel Sharon proposed Israel's unilateral disengagement plan from the Gaza Strip. Israeli settlers in the Gaza Strip who were opposed to the abandonment of their settlements had asked for a national referendum to be held on the plan. Sharon opposed the holding of a referendum, and the law was instead passed through the Knesset. Israel's withdrawal from its Sinai settlements in the 1980s (part of the Egyptian-Israeli Peace Treaty) was also not put to a referendum.

Also, 13 out of 22 members of Prime Minister Benjamin Netanyahu's cabinet approved a bill on 28 July 2013 that any peace treaty with the Palestinian Authority that includes withdrawals from territory will be put before an Israeli referendum before enactment.
