= Haneen Zoabi =

Palestinian-Israeli politician

- حنين زعبي
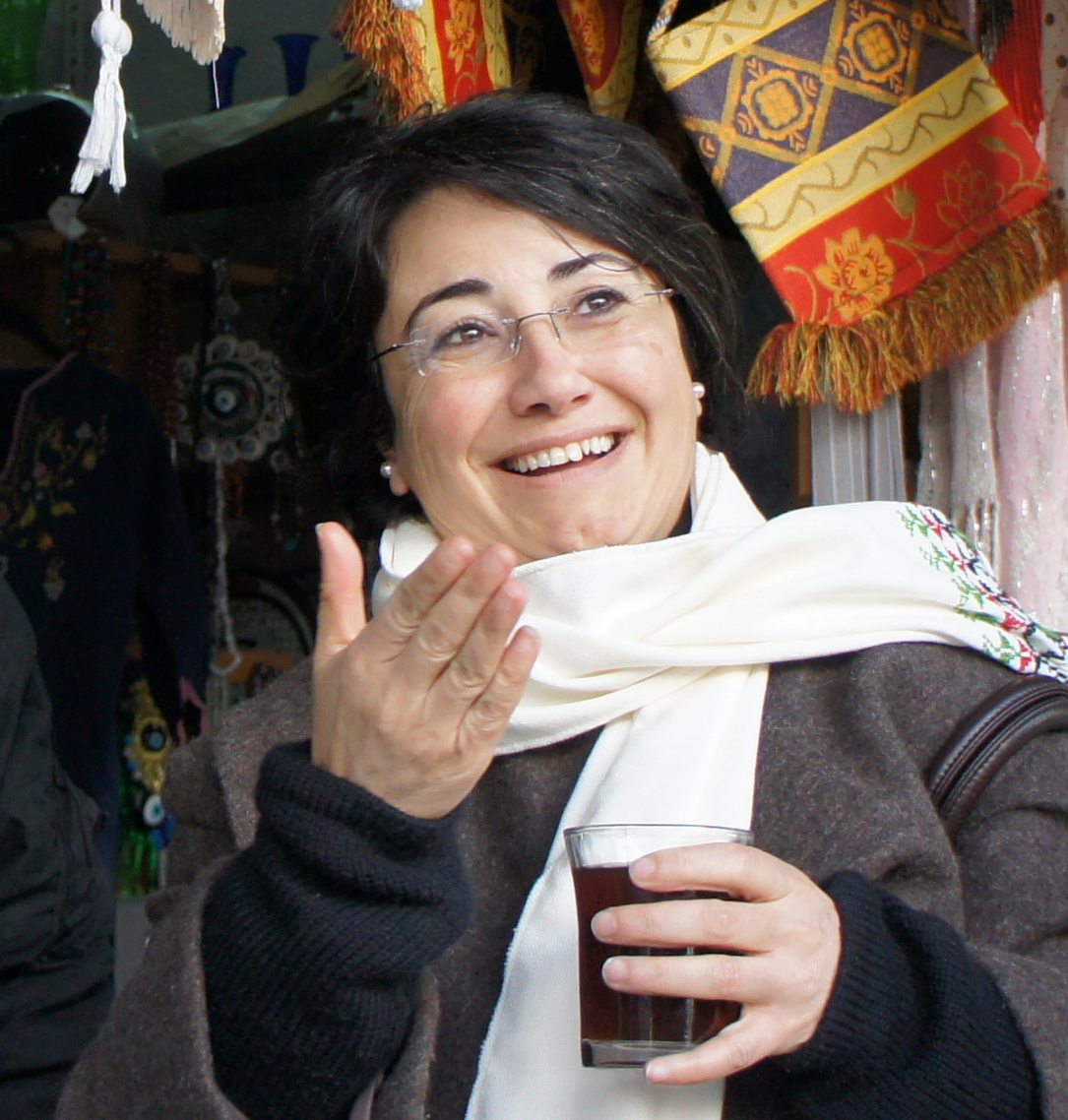
- Haneen Zoabi in 2012

Member of the Knesset
- In office 24 February 2009 – 30 March 2019

Faction represented in the Knesset
- 2009–2015: Balad
- 2015–2019: Joint List

Personal details
- Born: 23 May 1969 (age 57) Nazareth, Israel
- Party: Balad
- Education: University of Haifa, Hebrew University of Jerusalem
- Occupation: Politician

Haneen Zoabi (Arabic: حنين زعبي; Hebrew: חנין זועבי; born 23 May 1969) is a Palestinian-Israeli politician. The first Arab woman to be elected to the legislature on an Arab party's list, she served as a member of the Knesset for the Balad party between 2009 and 2019. She was convicted of forgery and fraud in 2021 after pleading guilty.

== Early life ==
Haneen Zoabi was born in Nazareth to a Muslim family. Zoabi studied philosophy and psychology at the University of Haifa, earning a Bachelor of Arts, and received a Master of Arts in communications from the Hebrew University of Jerusalem. She was the first Arab citizen of Israel to graduate in media studies, and established the first media classes in Arab schools. She also worked as a mathematics teacher and a school inspector for the Israeli Ministry of Education.

A member of the Zoubi family, she is a relative of Seif el-Din el-Zoubi, a former mayor of Nazareth and member of the Knesset between 1949 and 1959, and again from 1965 until 1979, and Abd el-Aziz el-Zoubi, a Deputy Health Minister and the first Arab member of an Israeli government.

== Political career ==
Zoabi joined Balad in 2001. She co-founded the NGO I'lam Media Center for Arab Palestinians in Israel in 2003, and was its general director until she resigned shortly before the 2009 election to focus on her political career. She ran for Knesset as a Balad candidate in 2006, but was too low on the party's electoral list to win a seat. She was placed third on the Balad list for the 2009 election and entered the Knesset after the party won three seats. She became the first female Arab MK from an Arab party, after Hussniya Jabara and Nadia Hilou had previously represented Meretz and Labor, respectively.

Prior to the 2013 election, MK Ofir Akunis of Likud submitted a request to disqualify Zoabi, Balad, and the United Arab List from the upcoming election. The request stated that "Zoabi has constantly undermined the State of Israel and has openly incited against the government, its institutions and IDF soldiers." The request also stated that she negated Israel's existence as a Jewish and democratic state, which made her eligible for disqualification. Zoabi called the sponsors of the request "fascists" and said that "for whoever does not want citizens to have free elections, I am one of many targets". After hearing the case, the Central Elections Committee (CEC) disqualified Zoabi in a 19–9 vote. However, the Supreme Court of Israel unanimously overturned the decision and allowed her to run, and she was subsequently re-elected. Following the election, Likud MK Danny Danon initiated a bill dubbed the "Zoabi Law" in February 2013, to amend the Basic Laws to make it harder for the Supreme Court to overturn a decision by the CEC, which failed to pass.

She faced another attempt prior to the 2015 election, when the CEC voted 27–6 to disqualify her from running in the election. However, the Supreme Court overturned the ruling in an 8–1 decision. She retired from national politics prior to the April 2019 election, although she was given a symbolic 113th slot on the joint list of Balad and the United Arab List.

== 2010 Gaza flotilla ==
Zoabi participated in the 2010 Gaza Freedom Flotilla, and was on board the MV Mavi Marmara when violence broke out as Israeli commandos boarded the ship. She was arrested and held briefly. At a news conference upon her release, she called the raid criminal, saying she witnessed two wounded passengers bleed to death after the Israelis refused to provide requested medical aid. She also stated that "it was clear from the size of the force that boarded the ship that the purpose was not only to stop this sail, but to cause the largest possible number of fatalities in order to stop such initiatives in the future."

In a Knesset speech a day after her release, she called the raid a "pirate military operation" and asked for an international investigation. She also demanded to know why the Israeli government had not released photos and videos it confiscated from passengers that might shed light on why nine passengers were killed and dozens wounded. During her address she also said, "Israel spoke of a provocation, but there was no provocation. Why does the government of Israel oppose an investigation?" She was repeatedly interrupted and shouted down during the speech by other lawmakers, one shouting "Go to Gaza, traitor!" The chaos reached a peak when MK Anastasia Michaeli charged the podium in an attempt to prevent Zoabi from continuing. Zoabi received death threats after the speech, and two security guards were assigned for her protection. One man was arrested for offering on Facebook a reward of free groceries for killing Zoabi.

Israel Interior Minister Eli Yishai requested that Attorney General Yehuda Weinstein revoke Zoabi's parliamentary immunity and authorize Yishai to strip her of Israeli citizenship. He accused her of engaging in a "premeditated act of treason", claiming she had assisted activists on board the ship, and was "undoubtedly aware" of their preparations to attack IDF soldiers. Likud MK Yariv Levin also accused her of betraying the State of Israel, and called for her prosecution.

A Knesset committee voted 7–1 to recommend her parliamentary immunity be revoked, which attracted concern from the international Inter-Parliamentary Union. Knesset Speaker Reuven Rivlin ignored the recommendation and declined to submit it to a vote of the full Knesset. He and Prime Minister Benjamin Netanyahu hoped that sparing Zoabi would protect Israel from further international condemnation over its blockade of Gaza and raid of the MV Mavi Marmara. Rivlin is known for his advocacy of Arab-Jewish coexistence, and was stunned by the attempts to remove Zoabi's parliamentary privileges, as well as the near-physical attack. He asked if they would do that to a Jewish MK.

The full Knesset voted 34-16 on 13 July 2010 to strip Zoabi of three parliamentary privileges as a penalty for her participation in the flotilla: the right to have a diplomatic passport, entitlement to financial assistance for legal help, and the right to visit countries which Israel does not have diplomatic relations. She was also stripped of the right to participate in Knesset discussions and to vote in parliamentary committees. Attorney General Weinstein closed the case against her in 2011 because of "significant evidentiary and legal difficulties."

She commented three years after the events that she expected "MKs would want to hear firsthand testimony" and be questioned, but was naive and encountered hate politics.

== Knesset suspensions ==
=== First (2014) ===
Five days after three Israeli teenagers were kidnapped and murdered by Palestinians on 15 June 2014, Zoabi questioned whether it was "strange that people living under occupation would kidnap" Israelis. She said she did not agree, but understood how they felt compelled to kidnap Israelis.

Many Israeli figures criticized her words. Labor opposition leader Isaac Herzog said they were "harmful to peace and the coexistence of Jews and Arabs in Israel" and "the families...awaiting news [of] their missing loved ones." Foreign Minister Avigdor Liberman said that like the kidnappers, "Zoabi is a terrorist". Knesset Interior Committee chairwoman Miri Regev said Zoabi is " a traitor and should be deported to Gaza." Zoabi reported receiving hundreds of death threats in the first days after her comments. She was surprised, saying "the injustice inflicted on the other side is so much greater. There are thousands of abducted Palestinians in Israeli prisons."

She was suspended from the Knesset plenum for a duration of six months on 29 July. During that time she was not allowed to address the Knesset or its committees. She appealed the suspension to the Supreme Court of Israel, but was rejected.

=== Second (2016) ===
Zoabi and two other Arab Israeli MKs met with the families of Palestinian attackers in February 2016 during the knife intifada. The stated purpose of the meeting was to secure the release of the attackers bodies for burial, which Israel held up until it received assurance the funerals would not be used for incitement against Israelis. For the participation in the meeting she and the two other Arab Israeli MKs were suspended from the Knesset for four months by the Knesset's Ethics Committee.

== Legal issues ==
Israeli attorney general Yehuda Weinstein ordered an investigation of Zoabi on charges of incitement and public disgrace after her 2014 comments about the kidnappings of three Israeli teenagers, who were later murdered.

Zoabi pleaded guilty to charges of forgery and fraud on 4 October 2021. She was convicted along with twelve other defendants, including other Balad party members. The ring was investigated for documents improperly filed in the 2013 Knesset election and local elections.

She was arrested by Israel Police on 21 September 2025 for "incitement to terrorism". According to a police statement, the arrest was due to a speech she gave at the "Palestine Congress" in Vienna, Austria in October 2024. At the conference, she said "it is not Hamas that resisted, it's the Palestinian people. You can not differentiate between Hamas and the Palestinian people. Those who entered [on] the seventh of October, they didn't enter the Israeli borders. They entered their own land." According to an Adalah attorney, Zoabi was released six hours later after questioning. Hadash condemned the arrest.

== Political views ==
Zoabi views herself as a Palestinian. At the 18th Knesset swearing-in ceremony on 24 February 2009, she left the Knesset plenum before the singing of Israel's national anthem, Hatikva. She later said it did not represent her. She described Avigdor Lieberman, Tzipi Livni, and Benjamin Netanyahu as "a bunch of fascists", but that Netanyahu is "much more dangerous" than Lieberman, because he "takes care to sugarcoat his message for the international media".

=== Israel-Palestinian conflict ===
She considers the two-state solution unrealistic and describes the notion that Israel is a Jewish state as inherently racist. Instead, she advocates a one-state solution for Jews and Palestinian Arabs with full rights and equality for both national groups. She has said that Israel's actions show "that it's unrealistic to have a real sovereign state in the West Bank and Gaza with Jerusalem as the capital."

She argues that rejection of the Jewish state concept is the only way to combat Lieberman's demand that Israeli citizens take loyalty oaths, and reduce his legitimacy. At a speech in Switzerland in 2016, she said that one state or two, they must be democratic and one cannot be Jewish. She called for the return of the descendants of Palestinian refugees as part of any final solution to the conflict.

=== Hamas ===
She said that "Hamas is not a terrorist organization" and believes that the West should engage with Hamas rather than boycott the militant group which rules the Gaza Strip. She said Palestinians should not be told who to choose for governance, and the international community cannot mediate neutrally if it labels Palestinian organizations as illegitimate.

=== Iran ===
The Jerusalem Post reported in March 2009 that Zoabi said she was not concerned that Iran might acquire nuclear weapons, suggesting that the Middle East needed a counterweight to Israel's nuclear weaponry. She said an Iranian nuclear weapon is only a potential threat, while the "real danger is the IDF". She also said that Iran was a positive influence on Palestinian affairs, and had played a more beneficial role in region than Jordan or Egypt because it stood more firmly "against occupation than a lot of the Arab countries". Jamal Zahalka, Balad's chairman at the time, said that Zoabi's comments represented an analysis rather than a party position, and did not constitute supporting a nuclear-armed Iran.

=== Israel Defense Forces ===
She has described soldiers of the Israel Defense Forces as "murderers". She and the Balad party reject any form of national service for Israel's Arab citizens.

== See also ==
- List of Arab members of the Knesset
- Women in Arab societies
