= Alex Eskin =

American mathematician (born 1965)

- Born: May 19, 1965 (age 61); Kiev
- Education: UCLA; Princeton University
- Scientific career
- Fields: Mathematics
- Workplaces: University of Chicago
- Thesis: Counting Lattice Points on Homogeneous Spaces (1993)
- Doctoral advisor: Peter Sarnak
- Doctoral students: Jayadev Athreya; Moon Duchin; Simion Filip

Alex Eskin (Russian: Александр Григорьевич Эскин, born May 19, 1965) is an American mathematician. He is the Arthur Holly Compton distinguished service professor in the Department of Mathematics at the University of Chicago. His research focuses on rational billiards and geometric group theory.

== Biography ==
Eskin was born in Kiev on May 19, 1965. He is the son of a Russian-Jewish mathematician Gregory I. Eskin, a professor at the University of California, Los Angeles. The family emigrated to Israel in 1974 and in 1982 to the United States.

Eskin earned his doctorate from Princeton University in 1993, under the supervision of Peter Sarnak.

Eskin has been a professor at the University of Chicago since 1999.

== Awards ==
Eskin gave invited talks at the International Congress of Mathematicians in Berlin in 1998, and in Hyderabad in 2010.

For his contribution to joint work with David Fisher and Kevin Whyte establishing the quasi-isometric rigidity of solvable groups, Eskin was awarded the 2007 Clay Research Award. In 2012, he became a fellow of the American Mathematical Society. In April 2015, Eskin was elected a member of the United States National Academy of Sciences. Eskin won the 2020 Breakthrough Prize in mathematics for his classification of $P$-invariant and stationary measures for the moduli of translation surfaces, in joint work with Maryam Mirzakhani.

== Selected publications ==
- Alex Eskin; Curt McMullen (1993). "Mixing, counting, and equidistribution in Lie groups". Duke Mathematical Journal. 71 (1): 181–209. doi:10.1215/S0012-7094-93-07108-6. S2CID 611397.
- Alex Eskin; David Fisher; Kevin Whyte (2012). "Coarse differentiation of quasi-isometries I: Spaces not quasi-isometric to Cayley graphs" (PDF). Annals of Mathematics. 176 (1): 221–260. doi:10.4007/annals.2012.176.1.3. S2CID 8793786.
- Alex Eskin; Maryam Mirzakhani; Amir Mohammadi (2015). "Isolation, equidistribution, and orbit closures for the $\text{SL}(2,\mathbb{R})$ action on moduli space". Annals of Mathematics. 182 (2): 673–721. arXiv:1305.3015. doi:10.4007/annals.2015.182.2.7. S2CID 8229920.
- Alex Eskin; Maryam Mirzakhani (June 7, 2018). "Invariant and stationary measures for the action on Moduli space". Publications Mathématiques de l'IHÉS. 127 (1): 95–324. arXiv:1302.3320. doi:10.1007/s10240-018-0099-2. S2CID 119906170.
