= Yellow brick road (mathematics) =

Type of path on Platonic solids

A Yellow brick road is "the unique simple closed path that solves the antisocial jogger problem for any of the Platonic solids. Such a path must (1) begin and end at a single vertex of the solid, and (2) be a straight line path that may cross over edges, but may not pass through any other vertices." The solution for the dodecahedron was given by mathematicians Jayadev Athreya and David Aulicino in a paper published 11 February 2019, and its area division was given by Li Zhou in a paper published 11 October 2021.
