= Peace discourse in the Israeli–Palestinian conflict =

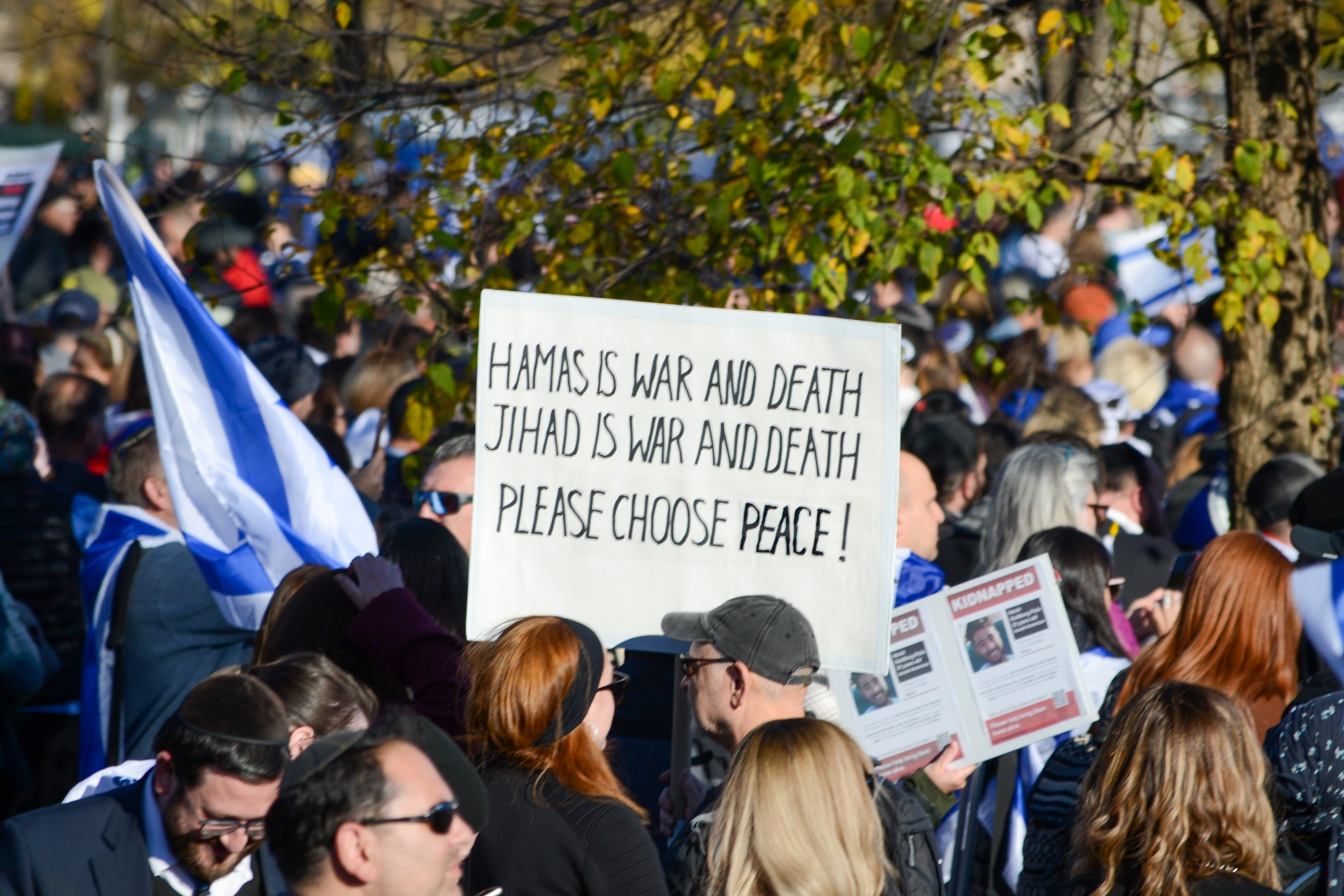
A 2023 pro-Israel march, with a sign blaming Hamas for the lack of peace.

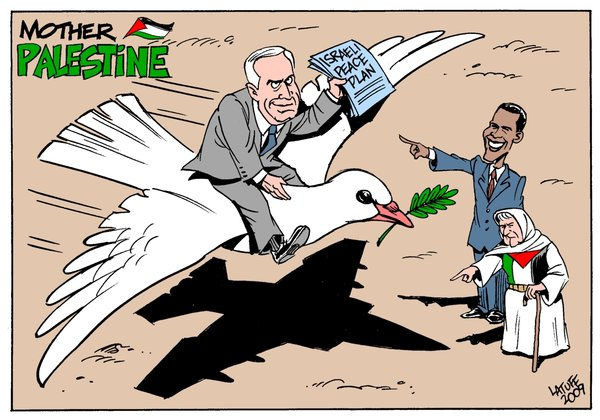
A 2009 pro-Palestinian satirical cartoon by Carlos Latuff, regarding different interpretations of "peace".

Peace discourse in the Israeli–Palestinian conflict is the study of Israeli and Palestinian desires for "peace" and the underlying intentions of the peace process. The peace narrative serves core strategic and ideological functions, including legitimacy, blame, and justification. Scholars have shown that references to peace often conceal or rationalize ongoing violence, shifting responsibility onto one party while reinforcing positive self-representations for the other. Both sides frequently claim to have done everything they can to achieve peace, remaining dependent on the other side to match their commitment.

== Meaning of peace ==
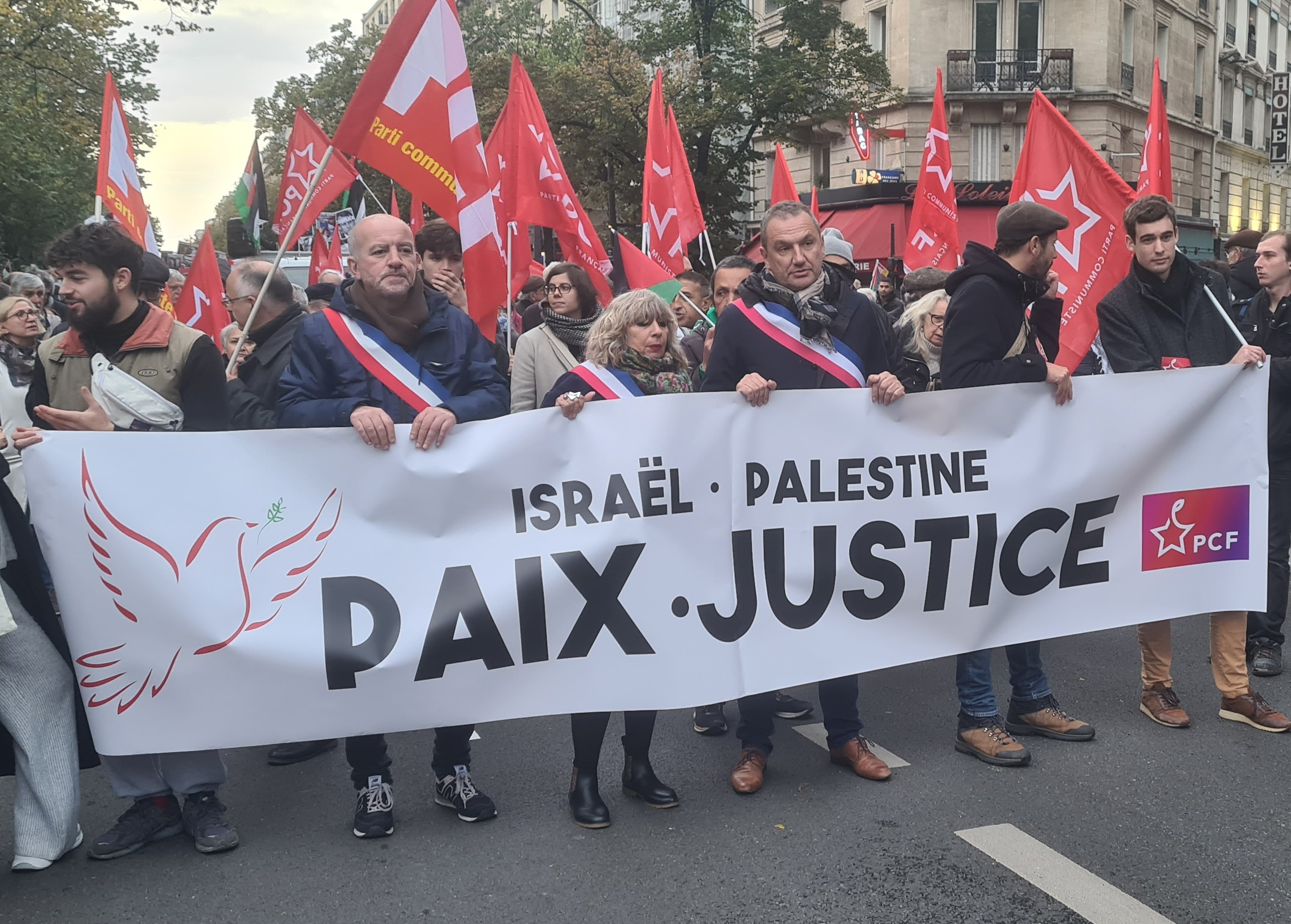
A sign connecting peace with justice.

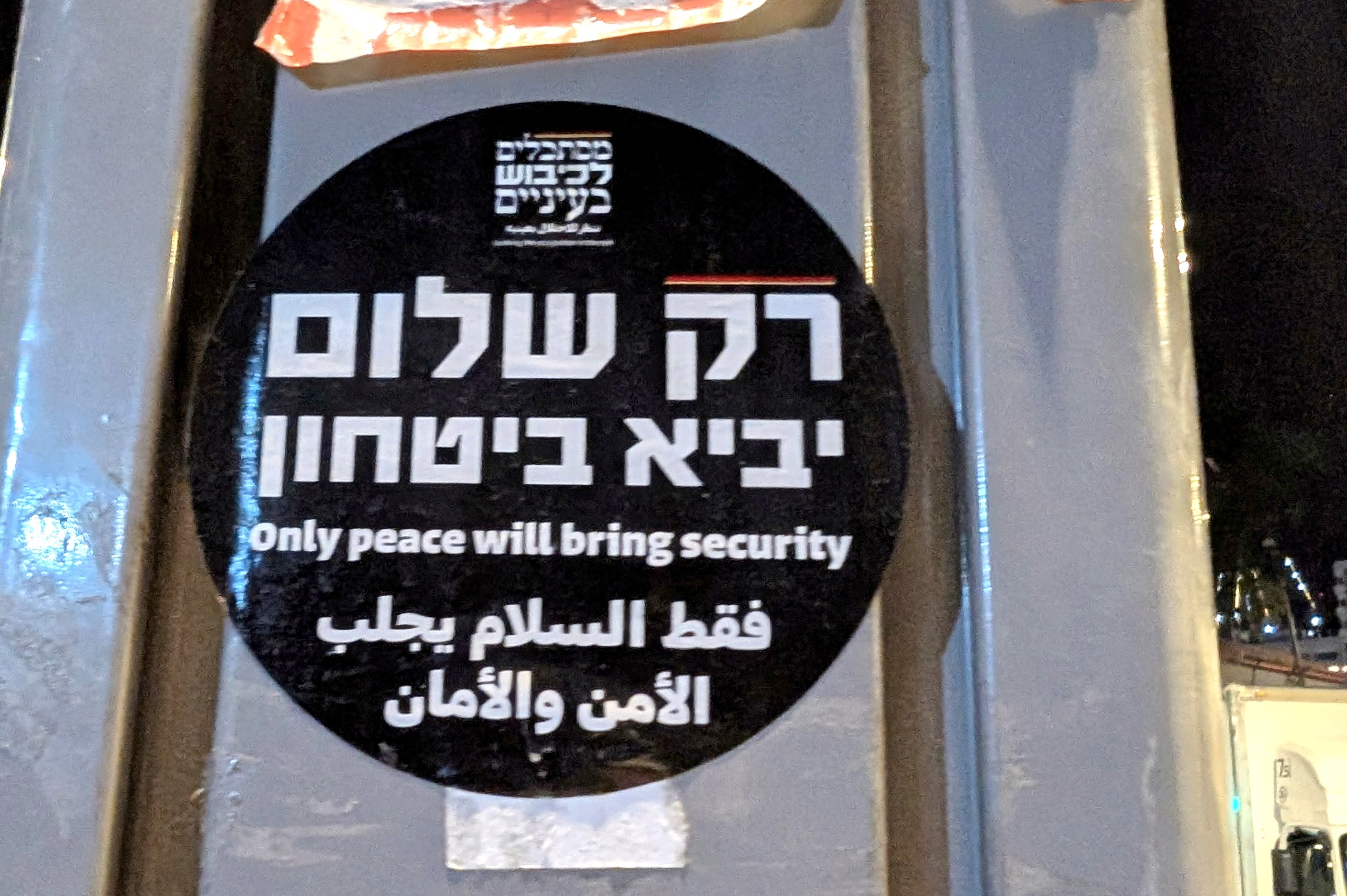
A sign connecting peace with security.

=== Positive and negative peace ===
The term peace is used in different ways by supporters of Israel and supporters of Palestine. Israeli scholar Dalia Gavriely-Nuri writes that right-leaning Israelis primarily advocate for a negative peace or oppressive peace, where peace means security for Israelis with continuing control over, oppression of, or subjugation of Palestinians. Supporters of Palestinians primarily advocate for a "just and lasting peace"; some pro-Palestinian actors have employed this language while avoiding substantive concessions, framing peace as achievable only through full Israeli withdrawal or restitution, placing the majority of the burden of change on Israel. Security-focused oppressive peace has not proven sustainable as of September 2023.

This use of different definitions of the word peace by the two sides results in negotiators talking past each other.

A similar term, "relative calm" has drawn criticism for often referring only to the absence only of Israeli casualties, while Palestinian casualties persist.

=== Peace as justification for war ===
"Peace" language does not always reflect intent for reconciliation, but may serve to justify violence or deflect responsibility. For instance, during the 2014 Gaza War, Israeli officials reframed ceasefires as less desirable than continuing to fight in order to achieve "sustainable peace," allowing ongoing military operations while claiming a peace-oriented stance. The use of peace rhetoric often supports what Dalia Gavriely-Nuri calls "Peace in the Service of War" (PSW), where peace becomes an integral part of Israeli just war rhetoric at the start of Israeli invasions, not specific to any particular leader or period of time. This strategy legitimizes such military actions as necessary for peace and national survival. On the Palestinian side, peace rhetoric can be used to frame resistance, or even acts of terrorism, as necessary steps toward liberation and eventual peace, and as justified responses to occupation couched in the language of justice-based peace.

Use of the term peace in this way constructs a moral identity for the speaker, helping build a "positive self-image as a peace-seeker together with delegitimation of rivals".

== History ==
Since the 1948 Palestine war, political language around peace has been shaped by ongoing violence, territorial disputes, and the failed Israeli–Palestinian peace process. Israeli narratives have consistently framed peace as conditional on security, while Palestinians have framed peace as conditional on justice. This framing persisted throughout the Israeli–Palestinian peace process. In more recent decades, peace has become a discursive tool used in justifying preemptive or retaliatory warfare. Israeli Professor Dalia Gavriely-Nuri notes that Israeli leaders have used the word peace extensively in speeches preceding wars, for example, Menachem Begin referred to peace 15 times but to war only 2 times in a 1982 speech preceding the 1982 Lebanon War. Palestinian peace discourse has also shifted over time, with the framing of peace as contingent on the realization of historical rights, emphasizing different elements over time, such as the right of return and recognition of statehood.

== Media analyses ==
Media discourses reinforce these rhetorical frameworks. Mahmood and Alvi found that U.S. newspaper editorials often supported military action as a pathway to peace (see Just war theory), while Arab media like Al Jazeera depicted Israeli peace rhetoric as deceptive and colonial. Both media groups typically excluded acknowledgment of the other side's positive actions. Peace discourse in US media often advocates "oppressive peace" or "negative peace".

In a January 2020 study of Twitter, Associate Professor Simon Goodman found that supporters of one side will reject peace by making the circular argument that the other side inherently does not want peace themselves. This argument is primarily made by supporters of Israel against Palestinians, casting peace as an offer previously extended by Israel and rejected by Palestinians in order to justify Israel continuing the conflict. While this circular logic is more frequently observed among pro-Israel users, pro-Palestinian voices have similarly dismissed Israeli peace initiatives as disingenuous or strategically manipulative, overlooking transgressions on their side.

== See also ==
- Arab–Israeli peace projects
- Islam and peace
- Israeli–Palestinian peace process
- Judaism and peace
- Land for peace

== Bibliography ==
- Mahmood, Afia; Alvi, Dr. Urooj Fatima (2025-01-08). "The Echoes of Peace in Newspapers Editorials: A Corpus Assisted Critical Discourse Analysis of Israel Palestine Conflict". Dialogue Social Science Review. 2 (4): 638–657. ISSN 3007-3154.
- Goodman, Simon; Tiripelli, Giuliana; Kambashi, Ngosa (2025). "Uses and Abuses of 'Not Wanting Peace' in the Context of the Israel/Palestine Conflict". Journal of Community & Applied Social Psychology. 35 (1) e70016. doi:10.1002/casp.70016. hdl:2086/24621. ISSN 1052-9284.
- Sambaraju, Rahul; McVittie, Chris (2024-11-08). "'Well, our goal is to achieve sustainable quiet and security for our people': Negotiating calls for ceasefires in the Gaza war of 2014 in mainstream English news media by Israeli spokespersons". Journal of Social and Political Psychology. 12 (2): 247–264. doi:10.5964/jspp.14039. hdl:20.500.12034/10857. ISSN 2195-3325.
- Sambaraju, Rahul; McVittie, Chris (2018-11-29). "Constructing Peace and Violence in the Palestinian-Israeli Conflict". In Gibson, Stephen (ed.). Discourse, Peace, and Conflict: Discursive Psychology Perspectives. Springer. ISBN 978-3-319-99094-1.
- Gavriely-Nuri, Dalia (2014-01-02). "'Talking Peace – Going to War': Peace in the service of the Israeli just war rhetoric". Critical Discourse Studies. 11 (1): 1–18. doi:10.1080/17405904.2013.835979. ISSN 1740-5904.
- Hallward, Maia (2011). "Pursuing 'Peace' in Israel/Palestine". Journal of Third World Studies. 28 (1). University Press of Florida: 185–202. ISSN 8755-3449. JSTOR 45194767.
- Gavriely-Nuri, Dalia (2010). "The idiosyncratic language of Israeli 'peace': A Cultural Approach to Critical Discourse Analysis (CCDA)". Discourse & Society. 21 (5). Sage Publications: 565–585. doi:10.1177/0957926510375934. ISSN 0957-9265. JSTOR 42889695.
- Gavriely-Nuri, Dalia (2010b). "If both opponents 'extend hands in peace' — Why don't they meet?: Mythic metaphors and cultural codes in the Israeli peace discourse". Journal of Language and Politics. 9 (3): 449–468. doi:10.1075/jlp.9.3.06gav. ISSN 1569-2159.
