= Simion Filip =

Moldavian mathematician

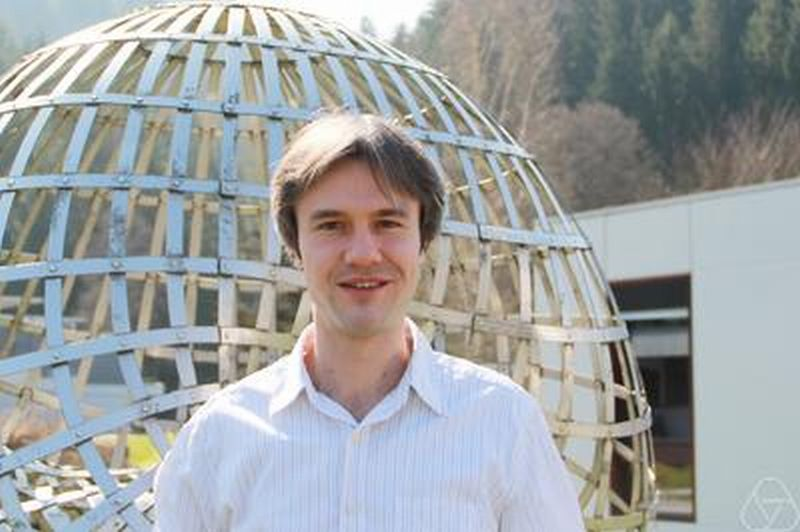
- Simion Filip at the Mathematical Research Institute of Oberwolfach in 2014
- Born: Chișinău, Moldova
- Citizenship: Romanian; Moldovan
- Education: University of Chicago; University of Cambridge; Princeton University
- Scientific career
- Fields: Mathematics
- Workplaces: University of Chicago
- Thesis: Teichmüller dynamics and Hodge theory (2016)
- Doctoral advisor: Alex Eskin

Simion Filip is a mathematician and professor of mathematics at the University of Chicago who works in dynamical systems and algebraic geometry.

== Early life and education ==
Filip was born in Chișinău, where he grew up and attended the Moldo-Turkish "Orizont" Lyceum, graduating in 2005. He is a dual citizen of Romania and Moldova. In 2004 and 2005, Filip won a bronze medal and a silver medal respectively while representing Moldova at the International Mathematical Olympiad.

Filip graduated with an A.B. in mathematics from Princeton University in 2009. He attended Part III of the Mathematical Tripos at the University of Cambridge where he received a master's degree with distinction in 2010. He received his Ph.D. under the supervision of Alex Eskin at the University of Chicago in 2016.

== Career ==
Filip spent two postdoctoral years as a Junior Fellow at Harvard University from 2016 to 2018, and another year at the Institute for Advanced Study. He joined the University of Chicago as an associate professor in 2019 and became a full professor in 2023.

== Awards ==
Filip received a five-year Clay Research Fellowship lasting from 2016 to 2021. In 2020, Filip was one of the recipients of the EMS Prize.

== Research ==
Filip's research focuses on the interactions between dynamical systems and algebraic geometry. In particular, he studies dynamics on Teichmüller spaces and studies Hodge theory in complex geometry.
