= Hajo Meyer =

Dutch physicist, Holocaust survivor and political activist (1924–2014)

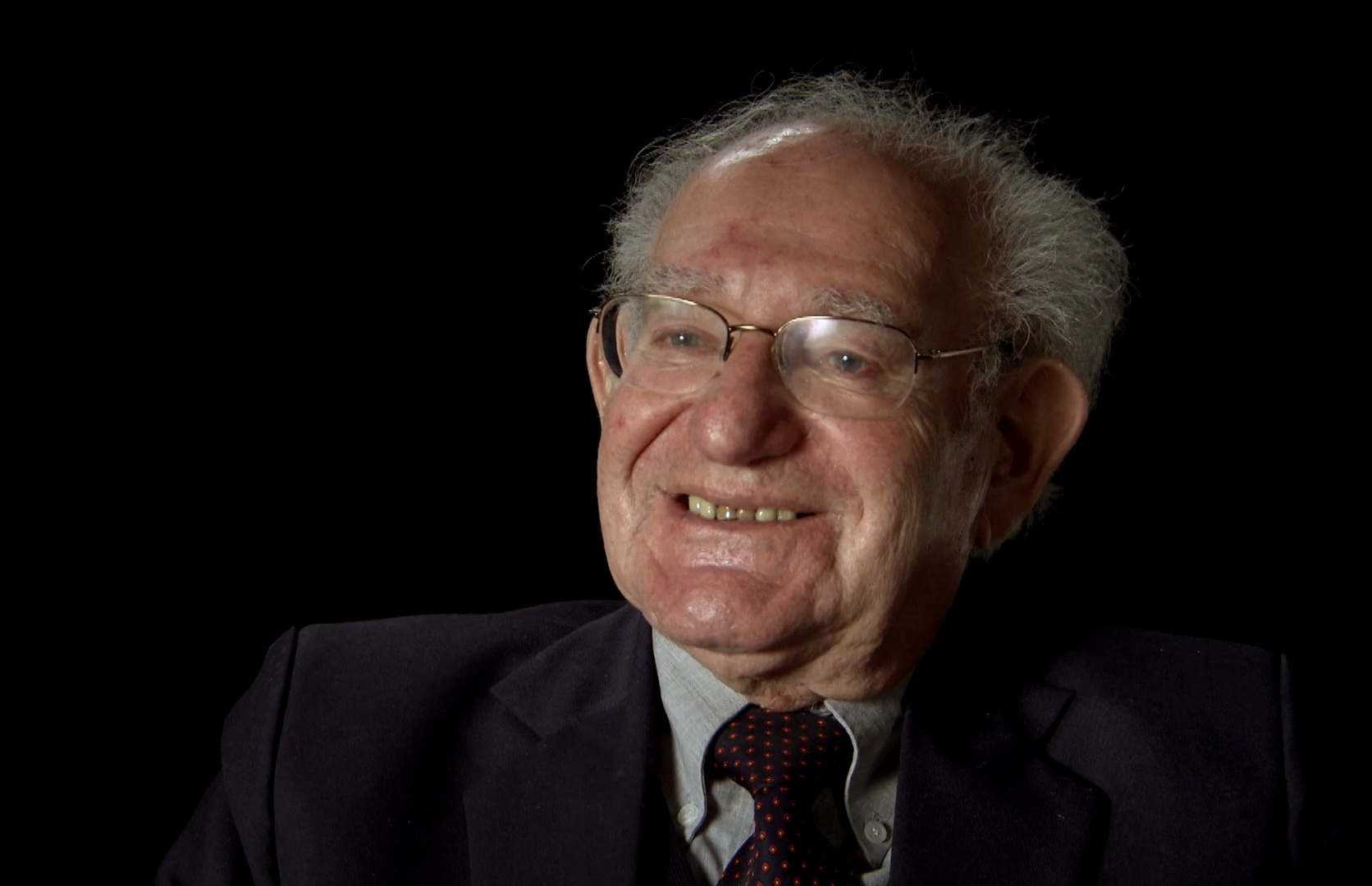
- Born: Hans-Joachim Gustav Meyer; 12 August 1924; Bielefeld, North Rhine-Westphalia, Germany
- Died: 23 August 2014 (aged 90); Heiloo, North Holland, Netherlands
- Citizenship: German (before 1945); Dutch
- Scientific career
- Fields: Theoretical physicist

Short movie My good fortune in Auschwitz. Mostly about his friendship with fellow prisoner Jos Slagter (1907–1977)

Hajo Meyer (German pronunciation: [ˈhaːjo ˈmaɪɐ]; Hebrew: האיו מאייר; born Hans-Joachim Gustav Meyer, pronounced [hans ˈjoːaxɪm ˈɡʊstaf ˈmaɪɐ]; 12 August 1924 – 23 August 2014) was a German-born Dutch physicist, Holocaust survivor and political activist. While primarily known for his public commentaries in terms of the European Jewish community, he is also noted for his work directing the facility Philips Natuurkundig Laboratorium for many years. In this capacity Meyer played a role in developing the ASML wafer stepper, a photolithography machine used in the production of integrated circuits (ICs) on silicon wafers.

== Early life ==
Meyer was born on 12 August 1924, as the youngest of three brothers, in Bielefeld, Germany, to Therese (née Melchior) and Gustav Meyer, a notary who had fought in the First World War. Meyer was Jewish. At age 14, he was sent by his parents from Nazi Germany to the Netherlands on 4 January 1939 as part of a Kindertransport convoy, and settled in Holland on his own. Their decision was made after Hajo was no longer permitted to attend school in the aftermath of Kristallnacht. His parents' maxim was: 'We do not dote to death on children' (bei uns gibt es keine Affenliebe). He went into hiding in 1943, but was arrested after a year and spent ten months in Auschwitz. After Auschwitz, he swore to never speak German again. He broke the rule at a scientific conference in Amsterdam after the war, when he happened to be speaking on a similar topic to that discussed by Hermann Haken.

His parents had originally been deported to Theresienstadt concentration camp in 1943, but after his father succumbed to an illness on 15 May 1944, it was decided by the Nazis that there was no more reason to allow his widow Therese to stay there, and that she should be deported to Auschwitz. However, she had hidden a cyanide capsule inside a piece of bread and chose suicide, knowing that the chances of survival there were non-existent. His correspondence with his parents while in exile during the war were published. The autobiography of his elder brother, Alfred, also dwells on their experiences during the war.

== Post-Holocaust ==
After the war, Meyer returned to the Netherlands, and studied theoretical physics. He eventually became director of the Phillips Physics Laboratory (NatLab).

After his retirement he took courses in woodwork and constructed violins and violas. He built about 50 of them.

== Political career ==
In his later years Meyer became politically active, becoming director of A Different Jewish Voice. He was a member of the International Jewish Anti-Zionist Network, founded in 2008 and the Dutch political party GroenLinks.

He was the first signatory of a statement by 250 Holocaust survivors and descendants of Holocaust survivors protesting the killings that were taking place during the 2014 Israel-Gaza Conflict.

=== Visit to Gaza and the West Bank ===
In 2005 Meyer visited the Occupied Palestinian territories, together with former Dutch prime minister Dries van Agt and other former ministers from Germany and Ireland, where he concluded that the Gaza Strip was "one big concentration camp". The situation in Hebron he found even worse. Israeli settlers came to live in the middle of the city, which meant that thousands of Palestinian shops and businesses had to close. Palestinians who live in the city are being assaulted there on a regular basis. Meyer witnessed one assault that could easily have become deadly.

=== Book ===
Meyer wrote a book titled Het einde van het Jodendom (The End of Judaism) in 2003,. (Note: German edition Das Ende des Judentums. Der Verfall der israelischen Gesellschaft, Melzer Verlag, Neu Isenburg 2005) In 2007 an English language edition of the book was published.

In his book, Meyer draws a comparison between the way Jews were treated in the 1930s by the Germans in Germany and later in The Netherlands, and what Israel is doing to the Palestinians, in Israel itself as well as in the occupied territories, all with the objective of making the Jews and Palestinians respectively, leave the country. It was not until this strategy began to fail that Hitler began to consider other solutions. Elements of this treatment were:

- Dehumanizing Jews by referring to them as animals, parasites, or a plague. The then Israeli Chief of Staff Moshe Ya'alon is quoted as speaking of the Palestinians as "cancer". Prime Minister Ariel Sharon later corroborated this statement as "true and correct". Former Minister of Education, Shulamit Aloni, confirmed the demonization of the Arabs in Israeli schoolbooks.
- Exaggerating the threat. Hitler was obsessed by the notion that Jews were planning to sweep Germany from the map. Likewise Israelis insist that the Palestinians not only want to drive Israel into the sea, but actually have the capacity to do so.
- Intimidation and harassment by the armed forces. Meyer finds it particularly painful that his "own people" are now involved in similar behaviour towards the Palestinians.
- Inflicting economic hardship by banning Jews from certain professions and boycotting Jewish stores. Analogous economic pressure has been put on Palestinians.
- Not intervening when Jews were being harassed by non-Jewish citizens. Meyer recalls a Purim celebration for children that was broken up by the SA. Complaints to the police had no effect. Israelis have been reported as attacking Palestinian farmers during their harvesting and targeting Palestinian schools with impunity.
- Applying collective punishment. For instance: If a Jew did something that displeased the regime, his or her relatives could be punished for it. Likewise, if the IDF suspected a Palestinian to be a member of Hamas, an entire apartment complex could be leveled.

The book accuses the successive governments of Israel of using the Holocaust to downplay the suffering and injustices they inflict on the Palestinians.

"Contrary to what Israel's government would have everyone believe, criticism of Israel is not the same as anti-Semitism", Meyer writes. In fact: "...at present the only reason to expect a revival of dangerous anti-Semitism is Israel's increasingly reprehensible policies". Meyer encourages non-Jews to "shed their guilt about the Holocaust" and feel free to criticize Jews who are clearly committing crimes. He claims that Jewish people and organizations must openly distance themselves from the current Israeli policies.

Among other things, Meyer concludes that the State of Israel and Zionism have "failed" because they have not lived up to the promise of a safe haven for the persecuted Jews of the world.

In the epigraph of his book Meyer quotes Rabbi Hillel: "That which is hateful to you do not do to your neighbor. That is the whole of the Torah." In the last chapter he states: "A people that has betrayed the basic ethical foundation of its long and astonishing survival will lack the vitality to preserve an identity of its own in the midst of an increasingly homogenous world".

=== Lectures ===
During his lectures Meyer repeatedly argued that there are parallels between the Nazi treatment of Jews leading to (but not including) the Holocaust, and Israel's dehumanization of Palestinians. He expanded on this sense of an analogy in an article in the Huffington Post:

I cannot help but hear echoes of the Nazi mythos of "blood and soil" in the rhetoric of settler fundamentalism which claims a sacred right to all the lands of biblical Judea and Samaria. The various forms of collective punishment visited upon the Palestinian people - coerced ghettoization behind a "security wall"; the bulldozing of homes and destruction of fields; the bombing of schools, mosques, and government buildings; an economic blockade that deprives people of the water, food, medicine, education and the basic necessities for dignified survival - force me to recall the deprivations and humiliations that I experienced in my youth.

At one of his talks, organized and hosted by the leader of the UK's Labour Party, Jeremy Corbyn, in 2010, Meyer was later reported to have repeatedly likened Israel's actions against the people of the Gaza Strip to the mass killing of Jews in the Holocaust and the government of Israel to that of Nazi Germany. During the talk, Meyer said that "Judaism in Israel has been substituted by the Holocaust religion, whose high priest is Elie Wiesel."

Meyer participated in the 2011 "Never Again – For Anyone" tour. He argued there are different interpretations of Judaism, and that Jews ought to return to the principles of the Book of Leviticus and the rabbinical principles of figures like Hillel, and avoid the 'doomsday Judaism' he identifies in the Book of Joshua as well as the positions of Abraham Isaac Kook which have in his view underwritten Zionism.

Meyer claimed that although Zionism predates fascism, Zionists and fascists have had a history of cooperation, charging that, among other things, Israel desires to foment anti-Semitism in the world to encourage more Jews to migrate to Israel.

Meyer spoke in favor of the Boycott, Divestment and Sanctions movement against Israel.

== Accusation of antisemitism ==
Henryk Broder publicly accused Meyer and his editor Abraham Melzer as being "capacities for applied Judeophobia" (Kapazitäten für angewandte Judäophobie) and producing "brown garbage" (braunen Dreck). Meyer and Melzer sued and in 2007 a court forbade Broder to make these statements. On appeal, a court mostly cleared Broder and Melzer saying that the statements were "legally admissible criticism" and stating that "Jewish anti-Semitism" exists.

== Death ==
On 23 August 2014, Meyer died in his sleep in Heiloo, Netherlands at the age of 90.
