= Black-Palestinian solidarity =

Political solidarity between Palestinian and Black people

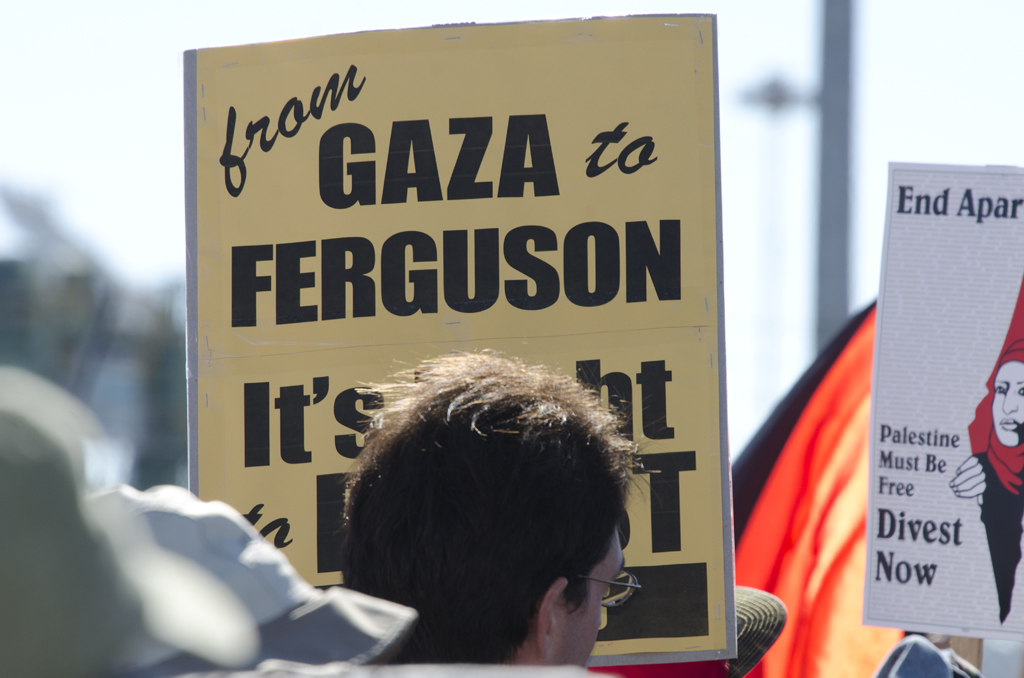
An American demonstrator holds a sign reading "From Gaza to Ferguson," in reference to the Ferguson unrest in the aftermath of the police shooting of Michael Brown.

There is a decades-long history of political solidarity between Palestinian people and Black people. African-American support for Palestine has been an element of the Black Panther Party and the Black Lives Matter movement. In South Africa, the African National Congress supports the Palestinian cause. For decades, many Black and Palestinian activists have believed in a "joint struggle" against racism and imperialism, including a shared opposition to Zionism.

== History ==
=== South Africa ===
Nelson Mandela consistently voiced strong support for Palestinian liberation, drawing clear parallels with South Africa’s own struggle against apartheid. In February 1990, shortly after his release from prison, he embraced Yasser Arafat in Lusaka, Zambia, reaffirming the Palestine Liberation Organization's deep ties with the African National Congress. Mandela explained, “We identify with the PLO because, just like ourselves, they are fighting for the right of self-determination. Arafat is a comrade in arms, and we treat him as such.”

Beyond political solidarity, the relationship between the ANC and the PLO extended into concrete military cooperation. Throughout the 1970s and 1980s, the PLO provided critical guerrilla warfare training and resources to members of Umkhonto we Sizwe (MK), the ANC’s armed wing. This support was especially significant given that Israel was one of the last countries to maintain ties with apartheid South Africa, including military and nuclear collaboration. The parallel struggles of the Palestinians and South Africans against systems of racial and colonial domination further cemented the alliance between the ANC and the PLO.

That same year, Mandela did not hesitate to condemn Israeli state violence, stating in an interview: “If one has to refer to any of the parties as a terrorist state, one might refer to the Israeli government, because they are the people who are slaughtering defenceless and innocent Arabs in the occupied [Palestinian] territories, and we don’t regard that as acceptable.”

In 1997, marking the International Day of Solidarity with the Palestinian People, Mandela declared: “We know too well that our freedom is incomplete without the freedom of the Palestinians,” affirming that South Africa’s liberation struggle was morally bound to the Palestinian cause.

While firmly critical of occupation and oppression, Mandela also promoted negotiated peace. During his 1999 visit to Israel and Palestine, he said: “My view is that talk of peace remains hollow if Israel continues to occupy Arab lands,” but added, “I cannot conceive of Israel withdrawing if Arab states do not recognise Israel within secure borders.”

In 2023, the African National Congress reiterated its support for Palestine and called for a ceasefire. President Cyril Ramaphosa referred to Israel as an apartheid state, called for a two-state solution, and said that "We suffered under apartheid, we show support for Palestine." On 29 December 2023, South Africa brought forth a genocide case against Israel in the International Court of Justice over the Gaza genocide. Mandla Mandela, the grandson of late South African leader Nelson Mandela, also announced his support for Hamas publicly during the Gaza war.

=== United Kingdom ===
Black Lives Matter UK declared that "we loudly and clearly stand beside our Palestinian comrades" as part of a "united front against colonialism."

=== United States ===
In the 1940s, the African-American diplomat and United Nations mediator Ralph Bunche expressed hesitation about the creation of the State of Israel due to the anticipated dispossession of the Palestinians.

In the 1950s, Malcolm X was one of the first major African-American figures who supported the Palestinian cause. In a 1958 press conference, Malcolm X stated that Black Americans "would be completely in sympathy with the Arab cause." Several months before his assassination in 1965, he visited the Gaza Strip and Palestinian refugee camps. The Nation of Islam, which Malcolm X formerly belonged to, has frequently criticized Israel.

In 1967, the civil rights activist Ethel Minor wrote a column for the Student Nonviolent Coordinating Committee titled Third World Roundup: The Palestinian Problem: Test Your Knowledge. The influential column described Israeli colonialism in Palestine and linked the Black American struggle to the Palestinian struggle. Stokely Carmichael (Kwame Ture) and a delegation of other members of the SNCC were hosted by the Palestine Liberation Organization. Carmichael (Ture) wrote in his 2003 memoir that the two had participated in a reading group which discussed Palestine and identified the alliance between Israel and Apartheid South Africa. He said that drafting "The Palestine Problem" for the newsletter was his final act as the chairman of the SNCC.

Founded in 1966, the Black Panther Party supported the Palestinian cause. The Black Panthers regarded African Americans as an "internally colonized" people and considered both Black Americans and Palestinians to be "Third World" peoples who were being oppressed by colonialism and imperialism. The Black Panthers developed relations with the Palestine Liberation Organization. Both groups recognized the glaring similarity between racial capitalism in the United States and in Israel. In addition to announcing solidarity, the Black Panthers and the Palestine Liberation Organization strategized together in Algiers, Algeria.

At the 1967 National Conference for New Politics, the Black caucus included a condemnation of "imperialist Zionist war" on its list of thirteen demands for non-Black conference attendees who agreed with it, and it was passed. Later, it was revised, and the revised list condemned "the imperialistic Israeli government" rather than Zionism.

In 1970, a group of 56 African-American activists published a statement titled "An Appeal by Black Americans Against United States Support for the Zionist Government of Israel" in The New York Times. The statement declared that Black Americans should have "complete solidarity with our Palestinian brothers and sisters, who like us, are struggling for self-determination and an end to racist oppression." The statement distinguishes between Zionists and Jewish individuals, stating that they are not anti-Jewish but rather anti-Zionist due to the belief that Zionism is a racist and imperialist ideology. The activists cite parallels between Israel, Rhodesia, and South Africa as they argue that all three countries are White settler-states built on the expulsion of indigenous populations. They argue that, as the Palestinian revolutionary movement is an anti-colonial movement, it shares alliances with anti-colonial revolutions in multiple African countries, such as Angola and Mozambique. In addition to advocating for "complete solidarity" with Palestinians, they also argue that any form of aid, including military aid, to Israel should cease.

In 2013, Dream Defenders was formed by Black and Palestinian college students in Florida following the murder of Trayvon Martin and the acquittal of George Zimmerman. The organization endorsed Boycott, Divestment and Sanctions in 2014 and has sent delegations to Palestine.

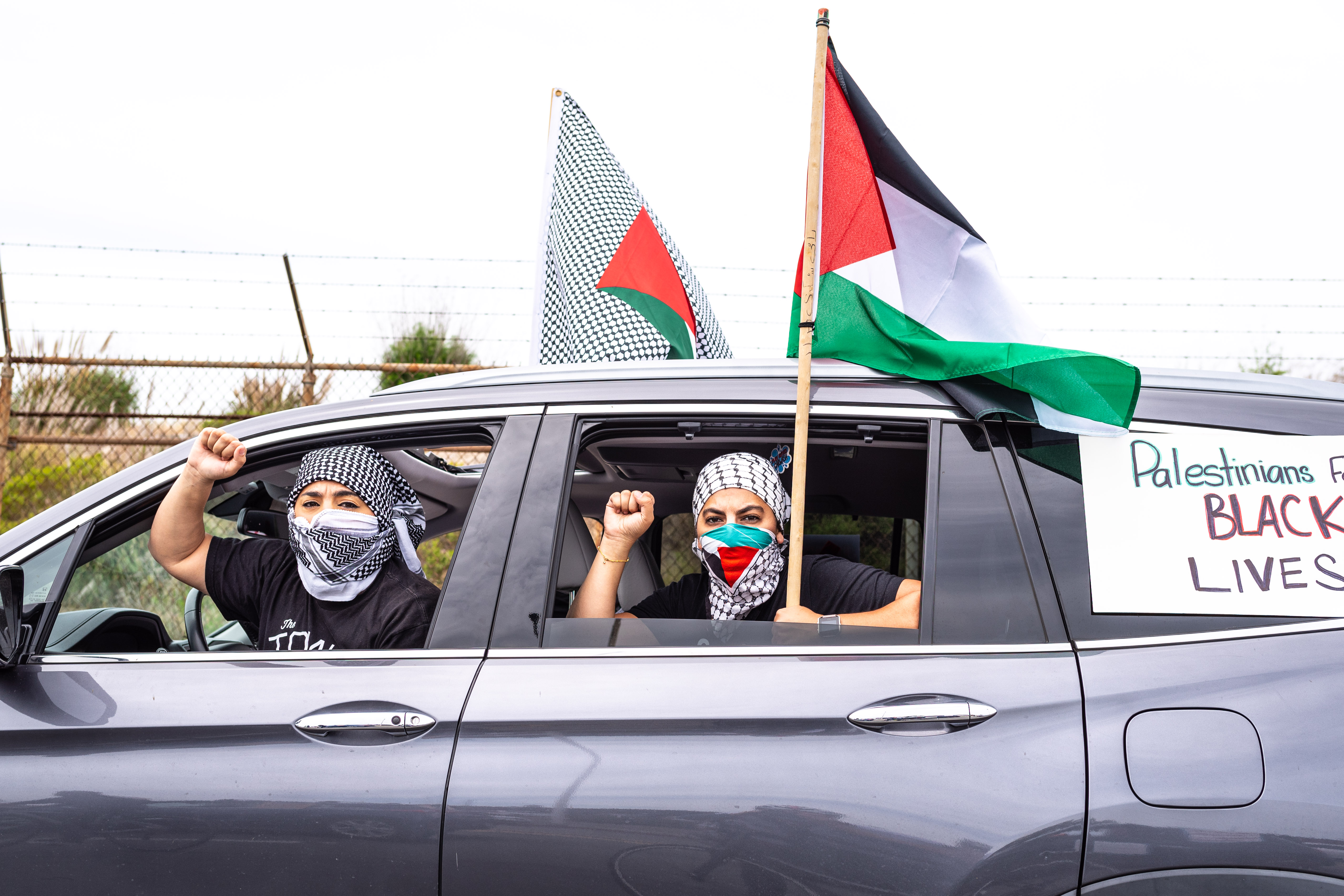
Palestinian activists display Palestinian flags and a sign stating "Palestinians For Black Lives."

During the 2014 Ferguson uprising, Palestinians sent advice to protesters via Twitter for resisting tear gas and other military tactics. Palestinian flags and a pro-Palestine chant gained prominence in the protests: "from Ferguson to Palestine, occupation is a crime!" In 2016, the Movement for Black Lives published its policy platform in which it described Israel as an apartheid state and accused Israel of committing genocide in Palestine. In response, the organization experienced a backlash from funders, event cancellations, and accusations of antisemitism.

The Ferguson uprisings also inspired the founding of Black4Palestine, an organization that is involved in a cross-solidarity movement. It strongly advocates the Palestinians' right to return, the Boycott, Divestment, and Sanctions Movement, anti-colonialism and anti-Zionism. The organization highlights the fact that both groups are experiencing unique forms of oppression, but their situations display many connections. The organization's mission statement is signed by many Black American activist groups and influential individuals such as the Marxist-feminist activist Angela Davis.

In January 2015, fourteen Black, Arab, and Latina activists journeyed to Palestine for a Dream Defenders delegation. The participants included Black Lives Matter cofounder Patrisse Cullors, journalist Marc Lamont Hill, and other Black political activists and organizers. The participants reported that during their trip, their conversations with Palestinians led them to believe that Palestinians faced many of the same issues that they faced back in the United States.

In 2021, during an interview which was broadcast on VICE News, former Hamas leader Yahya Sinwar drew parallels between the shared struggles against racism that Black Americans and Palestinians are engaged in. Sinwar stated that the murder of George Floyd was the result of a racist ideology, and he also stated that Israel perpetuates the same racist ideology against Palestinians in a multitude of Palestinian communities.

During the Gaza war, the Black American community's response was divided. While Black Lives Matter Chicago strongly expressed its support for the Palestinians, the National Newspaper Publishers Association declared that it is "firmly in solidarity with Israel."

== See also ==
- African American–Jewish relations
- African-American Jews
- Afro-Palestinians
- Black Judaism
- Black Liberation and Palestine Solidarity
- Black nationalism
- Interminority racism in the United States#African American–Jewish relations
- Islamic–Jewish relations
- Israeli apartheid
- Racism in Israel
- Racism in Jewish communities
- Racism in Muslim communities
- Xenophobia and racism in the Middle East
- List of pro‑Palestinian advocacy organizations
