= Judaism On Our Own Terms =

Network of independent college Jewish communities

- Abbreviation: JOOOT
- Formation: April 2019; 7 years ago
- Type: Network
- Affiliations: Open Hillel
- Website: jooot.org

Judaism On Our Own Terms (JOOOT) is a national network of independent Jewish communities on college campuses in the United States. It is affiliated with Open Hillel, and was established in April 2019 motivated by a desire to create welcoming Jewish spaces of open dialogue as well as opposition to Hillel International's "Standards of Partnership for Campus Israel Activities," standards that exclude groups from the Jewish community on campus on the basis of their views on Israel, views viewed as beyond acceptable dissent. Historically, JOOOT did not take a position on most political topics and does not limit the types of programming member communities can organize. Member communities are self-governed.

== History ==
In 2019, many JOOOT groups held Passover seders as alternatives to the ones offered by Hillel at their schools.

In September 2019, JOOOT held its second national conference. The conference took place at Brown University, with about 80 students attending from 27 different schools.

In December 2020, JOOOT produced a zine for Hanukkah after soliciting contributions from the JOOOT community on social media.

In 2023, as part of its restructuring process and its new Mission Statement and Points of Unity, JOOOT adopted a firmly anti-Zionist and anti-imperialist politic, vacating a position of more ambivalence.

== See also ==
- Jewish pro-Palestinian activism
