= Open Hillel =

American anti-Zionist advocacy group

- Predecessor: Hillel International
- Merged into: Judaism On Our Own Terms
- Founded: December 2013 (12 years ago)
- Founded at: Swarthmore College, Swarthmore, Pennsylvania, United States
- Dissolved: April 2019 (7 years ago)
- Type: Advocacy organization
- Legal status: 501(c)(3) organization
- Purpose: Israeli–Palestinian conflict, Anti-Zionism, Opposition to Hillel
- Location: United States

Open Hillel was a movement of branches of Hillel International (some disaffiliated) that "welcom[ed] speakers and sponsorships from across the political spectrum on Israel and Zionism", despite Hillel's position prohibiting anti-Zionist speakers. The first Open Hillel was created at Swarthmore College from Jewish students who wanted pro-Boycott, Divestment, Sanctions speakers to come to their local chapter of Hillel. Due to Hillel International's officially Zionist stance, it has rejected these "Open Hillels" as not part of their organization. Hillel International has stated that while it encourages debate on issues relating to the Israeli–Palestinian conflict and the Israeli settlements and the occupation of the West Bank, it has thoroughly denounced anti-Zionism as rejecting the Jewish people's right of self-determination. The organization's stated goals is to change Hillel International's rules on legitimate speakers for Hillel campus events. Others have seen this as a crackdown on free speech. This movement has spread to a couple of other colleges and universities, most notably Wesleyan University and San Francisco State University, and has cooperated with other Jewish anti-Zionist organizations, such as Jewish Voice for Peace. In April 2019, Open Hillel merged into Judaism On Our Own Terms.

== See also ==
- Judaism On Our Own Terms
- Jewish Voice for Peace
- Hillel International
- Chabad on Campus International Foundation
