= Anastassia Michaeli =

Israeli journalist, television presenter and politician

- אנסטסיה מיכאלי
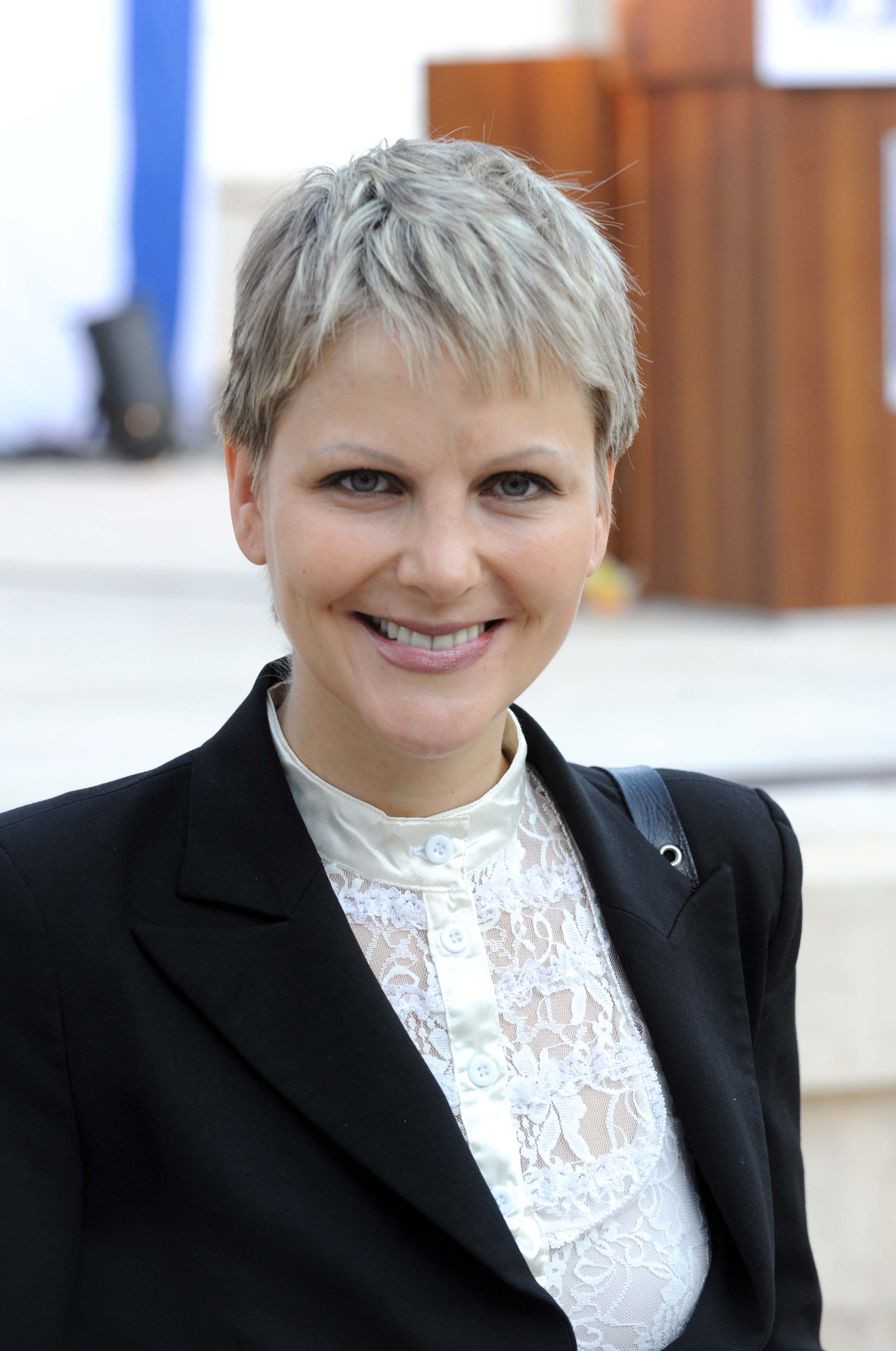

Faction represented in the Knesset
- 2009–2013: Yisrael Beiteinu

Personal details
- Born: Anastassia Mikhalevsky; 12 July 1975 (age 51) Leningrad, Soviet Union

Anastassia Yehudith Michaeli (Hebrew: אנסטסיה מיכאלי, Russian: Анастасия Михаэли (Михалевская); born 12 July 1975) is an Israeli journalist, television presenter, and politician. She served as a member of Knesset for Yisrael Beiteinu between 2009 and 2013. During her Knesset term she received media attention for attempting to physically disturb an Arab representative's speech and for comments she made on the psychology of gays and lesbians. While in the Knesset she was active in the international arena as chairperson of several parliamentary friendship leagues (with the legislatures of Estonia, Austria and Switzerland) and represented the Knesset in official delegations to the European Union, France, Great Britain and Taiwan.

== Biography ==
=== Early life and education ===
Michaeli was born Anastassia Mikhalevsky in Leningrad in the Soviet Union (now Saint Petersburg in Russia) to a Christian ethnic Russian family. Having obtained her education in a school focusing on the English language, she was able to help provide for her family by tutoring English to children. At this time, she headed the International Friendship Club active in her school, which was dedicated to hosting foreign delegations and strengthening international relations between youth. In her teens she was active in various sports, such as cross country skiing.

Michaeli studied for a year in a local university with a major in humanities. She holds a Master's degree in electrical engineering and communications from the Saint Petersburg University of Telecommunications. During her studies she was chosen as Miss St. Petersburg in 1995. She took a year off of her university studies to live in Paris, where she worked as a model.

She met Josef Samuelson, an Israeli businessman of Latvian-Jewish background. He was born in Riga, Latvia and immigrated to Israel in 1971 at the age of 11. He is 10 years her senior. They married in 1997.

Michaeli wed her husband twice. Having no Jewish background of her own, Michaeli converted to Judaism and the couple remarried according to Halakha. In Israel, after the birth of her second son, she underwent an Orthodox Jewish conversion, culminating with the couple's remarriage, this time according to strictly religious rites, in 2000.

After studying in an ulpan, Michaeli graduated from Bar-Ilan University with a diploma in business administration.

Michaeli, after having had an Orthodox conversion, keeps a kosher home and has enrolled her children in state religious schools. Michaeli adheres to a Zionist philosophy within her family as well as in her career, stating "Judaism is at the basis of why we have this country to begin with. It's not just a religion." She lives in Rishon LeZion with her husband and their eight children. Her eighth child was born during her parliamentary term.

=== Television career ===
Her media career began in 1998. In 2002 she joined the new Israel Plus Russian-language television station, where she worked as a journalist and presenter of Life's Pleasures, and the daily Morning program.

== Election to the 18th Knesset ==
In 2005, Michaeli joined Ariel Sharon's Kadima party towards the 2006 elections but it failed to win enough votes to secure her a Knesset seat.

In December 2008, Michaeli accepted Avigdor Lieberman's offer to join his Yisrael Beiteinu party. She was placed ninth on its list for the 2009 elections. Michaeli became a member of the 18th Knesset when the party won 15 seats.

=== Attacks against Arab parliamentarians ===
Michaeli was reprimanded by the Knesset Ethics Committee for attempting to physically disturb Israeli-Arab MK Hanin Zuabi while Zuabi was delivering a speech about the 2010 Gaza flotilla raid. The Ethics Committee statement read, "The committee could not find a precedent in which an MK attempts to physically disturb another MK's speech by taking the stand without permission. A line was crossed that cannot be ignored."

In January 2012, Michaeli threw a cup of water on Israeli-Arab MK Raleb Majadele during an argument about an Arab high school principal who had taken students to the annual Human Rights Day march in Tel Aviv. On 10 January the Ethics Committee suspended Michaeli from the participation in the Knesset plenum or committees for four weeks, but still allowed her to take part in house votes during that period. Labor party leader Shelly Yachimovich attacked Michaeli's "wild and violent" behavior and said it must have had a racist motivation.

=== Statements on gay and lesbian people ===
Speaking at a Knesset committee meeting in June 2012, Michaeli stated that most gay people had suffered sexual trauma at a young age and committed suicide by age 40. Specifically, Michaeli said: "I think that most gays are guys that suffered very difficult experiences of sexual harassment at a very young age and it just gets worse. ... In the end they commit suicide when they reach the age of 40 and it's those same guys that want to be women. I hope our awareness will rise too ... This is a campaign that needs to be done with professionals, also with psychologists." LGBT groups were outraged by the statements, and 300 protested in a gay pride march in Tel Aviv.

In an interview a week after the first controversial comment, Michaeli said that "Young girls become pregnant and have abortions that hurt their chances to get pregnant in the future, and in the end they become lesbians." The statements were made in connection with her work to ask television broadcasts to be regulated for violent and sexual content. At the same interview, Michaeli refused to apologize for the earlier statement on gays and sexual trauma. She said, "If a man would say the same things instead of me, there wouldn't have been such a wide and robust response to it. I expressed my opinion and it should be respected. A sexual preference forms because we don't have enough advertising for normative family values and proper sexual education."

In advance of the 2013 elections Michaeli decided to withdraw her name from the list of candidates.
