= Jayadev Athreya =

American mathematician (1983-)

- Born: 1983 (age 42–43)
- Education: University of Chicago (PhD, 2006); University of Chicago (MS, 2001); Iowa State University (BS, 2000)
- Known for: Mathematics
- Father: Krishna B. Athreya
- Scientific career
- Thesis: Quantitative Recurrence for Teichmuller Geodesic Flow (2006)
- Website: https://faculty.washington.edu/jathreya/

Jayadev Siddhanta Athreya (born 1983) is a professor of mathematics at Fordham University. He is a fellow of the American Mathematical Society. His research interests are in ergodic theory, dynamical systems, and geometry.

== Education ==
Athreya grew up in Ames, Iowa where he obtained a Bachelor of Science at Iowa State University in 2000. He went on to earn a MS in 2001 and a PhD in 2006 both in mathematics at the University of Chicago where he was advised by Alex Eskin.

== Career ==
After graduating Athreya was a postdoctoral fellow at Yale University and Princeton University. In 2006, he was at Yale. In 2007, he took on a position at Princeton for a year before returning back to be a Gibbs instructor at Yale.

In 2010, he started a position as assistant professor at the University of Illinois where he founded and directed the Illinois Geometry Lab, now known as the Illinois Mathematics Lab. In 2015, he went on to be an associate professor at the University of Washington and created the Washington Experimental Mathematics Lab. In 2020, he was promoted to full professor at the University of Washington.

In 2021, Athreya became Interim Director of the Pacific Institute for the Mathematical Sciences where in 2022 he took on the position of co-Director. Since 2021, Athreya still resides on the board of directors of the Pacific Institute for the Mathematical Sciences.

== Awards and honors ==
He was awarded a visiting fellowship by the London Mathematical Society in 2009.

In 2025, Athreya became a fellow of the American Mathematical Society.

== Social justice ==
The activity of collaborating with the police is not something we feel a mathematician should be doing.

— Jayadev Athreya, Nature

In reaction to recent killings of individuals in 2020, Athreya and other mathematicians wrote a letter pleading for their peers to cease collaborations with police departments due to well documented disparities in how these agencies treated people of different races and ethnicities. More specifically, they criticized the practice of predictive policing.

In 2023, Athreya signed a letter in solidarity with the Haverford Faculty for Justice in Palestine as well as to sharing mourning over the killings of the students Kinnan Abdalhamid, Tahseen Ahmed, and Hisham Awartani in November of the same year.

== Research ==
Athreya along with David Aulicino and Patrick Hooper discovered that there exists an infinite number of straight paths on the dodecahedron that start and end at one vertex without intersecting any other vertex.

== Selected works ==
- Athreya, Jayadev; Aulicino, David (11 Feb 2019). "A Trajectory from a Vertex to Itself on the Dodecahedron". The American Mathematical Monthly. 126 (2): 161–162 – via Taylor & Francis online.
