= Jews for Israeli–Palestinian Peace =

Swedish Jewish advocacy group

- Judar för israelisk-palestinsk fred
- Formation: 1982
- Headquarters: Stockholm, Sweden
- Chair: Dror Feiler
- Website: https://jipf.nu/

Jews for Israeli–Palestinian Peace (Swedish: Judar för israelisk-palestinsk fred), abbreviated as JIPF, is a Stockholm-based association, founded by Swedish Jews in 1982, following the Israeli invasion of Lebanon.

== Activities and advocacy ==
JIPF states that they want to work for a "fair and lasting peace" in the conflict between Israelis and Palestinians, based on national self-determination and independence for both peoples. Its political programme include demands for a creation of a Palestinian state, Israel's withdrawal from all territories occupied in 1967, the dismantlement of Israeli settlements and that the Palestinian refugee question must be based on the principle of the right of return or economic compensation.

With a grant from the Helena Berings Minnesfond (English: Helena Berings Memorial Fund) the group co-ran a school program in partnership with the Palestinian Association of Sweden. The program facilitated dialogues between Palestinians and Jews in approximately fifty schools over three years.

== Notable members ==
Dror Feiler is the chairman of the organization. Other members include Izzy Young, the journalist Annika Thor and the pediatrician Henry Ascher.
