= Jewish pro-Palestinian activism =

Jewish support for Palestinian rights

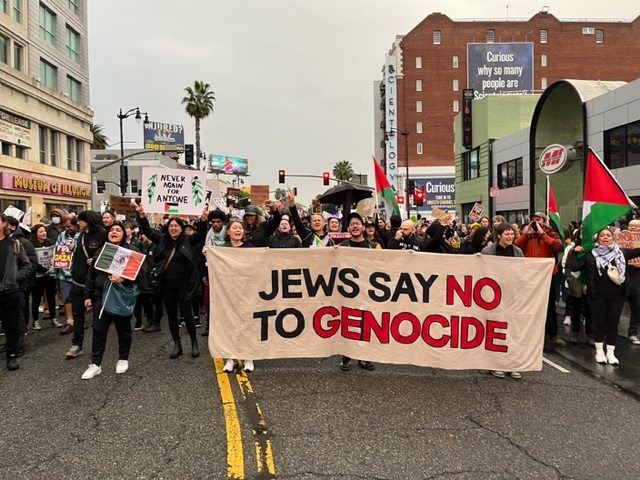
Jewish Voice for Peace and IfNotNow activists at a protest in Hollywood, November 2023.

Jewish support for the rights of Palestinians has existed since before the creation of the State of Israel. Jewish support for Palestinian rights or an independent Palestinian state has often come from Jewish anti-Zionists and Jewish leftists, many of whom support a one-state solution to the Israeli-Palestinian conflict. Some Orthodox Jews are also supportive of Palestinians, including Haredi groups such as Neturei Karta, who oppose Zionism for religious reasons. Liberal Zionist denominations of Judaism such as the Union for Reform Judaism are supportive of the existence of an independent Palestinian state in the context of a two-state solution.

Jewish support for Palestinian causes is stronger in the diaspora compared to among Israeli Jews. Among American Jews, there is a generational divide, with younger Jews expressing significantly more sympathy with Palestinian causes compared to older generations. Jewish supporters of Palestinians face accusations from Zionists of being self-hating Jews, while pro-Palestinian Jews themselves often articulate their advocacy as an expression of their Judaism or Jewish values.

== By country ==
=== Argentina ===
In Argentina, the group Judies X Palestina (Jews for Palestine) was founded in 2021 and has gained greater popularity since the Gaza war.

=== Australia ===
The Jewish Council of Australia, founded in 2024 to represent non-Zionist Jewish interests, supports Palestinian freedom and justice, and criticises the Israeli government.

=== Austria ===
In 2025, anti-Zionist Austrian Jews held a conference in solidarity with Gaza.

The Yiddish singer Isabel Frey has stated her belief that the philosemitic Holocaust memory culture in Austria and Germany causes non-Jewish Austrians and non-Jewish Germans to "fetishize" Jews in a "pseudo-tolerant" way, leading to intolerance of pro-Palestinian Jewish anti-Zionist viewpoints. Along with other Yiddish musicians, Frey produced "Lider mit Palestine", an album of Yiddish-language music in which, according to the Times of Israel, "Israel is referred to as an "evildoer" (roshe) and "oppressor" (badriker); counting the producers' and artists' statements and the lyrics themselves, "genocide" is mentioned over a dozen times."

=== Brazil ===
In Brazil, some pro-Palestinian Jews are members of Vozes Judaicas por Libertacao (Jewish Voices for Liberation), which was founded in 2014.

=== Canada ===
In Toronto, some pro-Palestinian Jews are members of the organization Jews Say No to Genocide.

=== Denmark ===
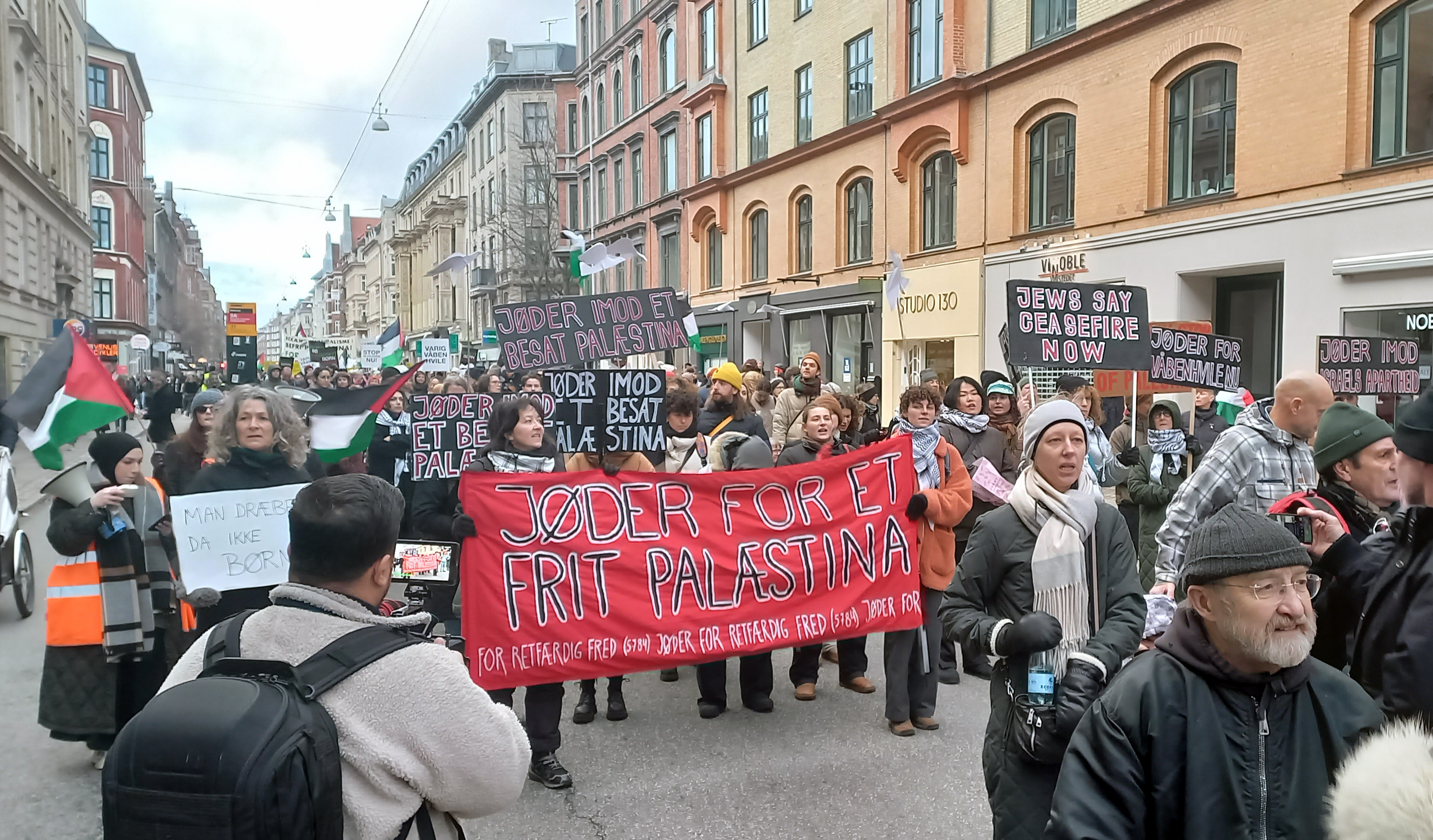
Jews for a Just Peace (Jøder for Retfærdig Fred) demonstrators with banners saying "Jews for a free Palestine", "Jews against an occupied Palestine", "Jews for ceasefire now", and "Jews against Israel's apartheid" during a protest march against the war on Gaza in Copenhagen, Denmark, February 02, 2024.

In Denmark, the organization Jøder for retfærdig fred (Jews for a Just Peace) has about 80 members or about 1% of the Danish-Jewish population.

=== Germany ===
Some German Jews are active in the pro-Palestinian movement in Germany. Due to the normative Zionism and anti-antisemitism in German culture, Jewish anti-Zionist perspectives are often controversial in German media and politics. According to the Berlin-based musician Peaches, progressive pro-Palestinian Jewish perspectives are often subjected to "censorship" in Germany. In a New York Times interview, she stated that Germans "can't separate Israeli politics from Jewish feelings" and thus a diversity of Jewish opinion is not "honored".

In 2023, pro-Palestinian Jews were present at protests against Benjamin Netanyahu that were held at the Brandenburg Gate.

=== Ireland ===
Some Irish Jews are members of the organization Jews for Palestine-Ireland.

=== Israel and Palestine ===
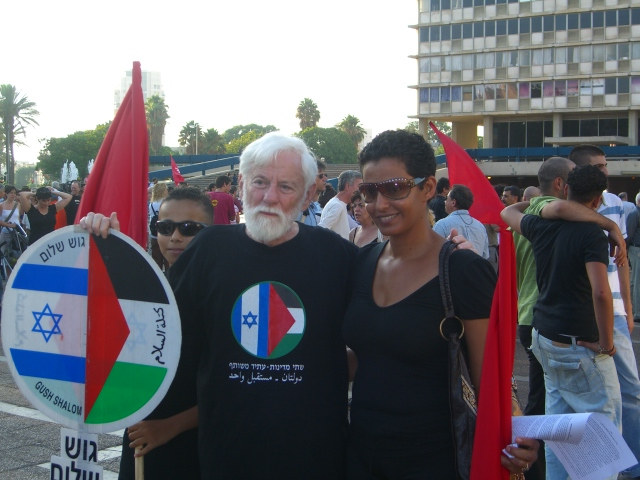
Peace activist Uri Avnery at a Hadash rally against the 2006 Lebanon War

In Israel, peace movements emerged in the 1970s in the aftermath of the unexpected Yom Kippur War in 1973. Prior to this, pro-Palestinian advocacy was limited to smallgroups such as Maki and Matzpen. The Israeli peace movement peaked in influence during the time of the Oslo Accords in the 1990s, and went into severe decline following the failed 2000 Camp David Summit and Second Intifada, after which right-wing groups such as NGO Monitor and Im Tirtzu were established in order to support the state and combat pro-peace and pro-Palestinian activism.

Pro-Palestinian Jews are the minority of Israeli Jews and may experience harassment, threats, or violence due to their political views.

=== South Africa ===
Some South African Jews are members of "South African Jews for a Free Palestine", an anti-Zionist Jewish organization.

=== Mexico ===
Compared to most other Latin American countries, Mexico has a more significant number of anti-Zionist Jews involved in pro-Palestinian politics. Some pro-Palestinian Mexican Jews are members of the organization Jews for Palestine. Pro-Palestinian Mexican Jews maintain strong involvement within pro-Palestinian collectives within Mexican academic institutions.

=== Morocco ===
Abraham Serfaty was a critic of Zionism and supporter of the rights of Palestinians.

In 1969, in the aftermath of the 1967 Arab–Israeli war, the Marxist activist Abraham Serfaty (1926–2010), newly appointed editor-in-chief of the literary magazine Souffles-Anfas, published a special 15th edition dedicated to Palestine entitled "Pour la révolution palestinienne" ("For the Palestinian Revolution"), marking a new direction for the magazine.

Sion Assidon (1948–2025) was a founding member of the Morocco branch of Boycott, Divestment and Sanctions.

=== United Kingdom ===
The International Jewish Anti-Zionist Network (IJAN) has a chapter in the UK which organized weekly protests calling for the expulsion of Israel's ambassador to the UK.

=== United States ===
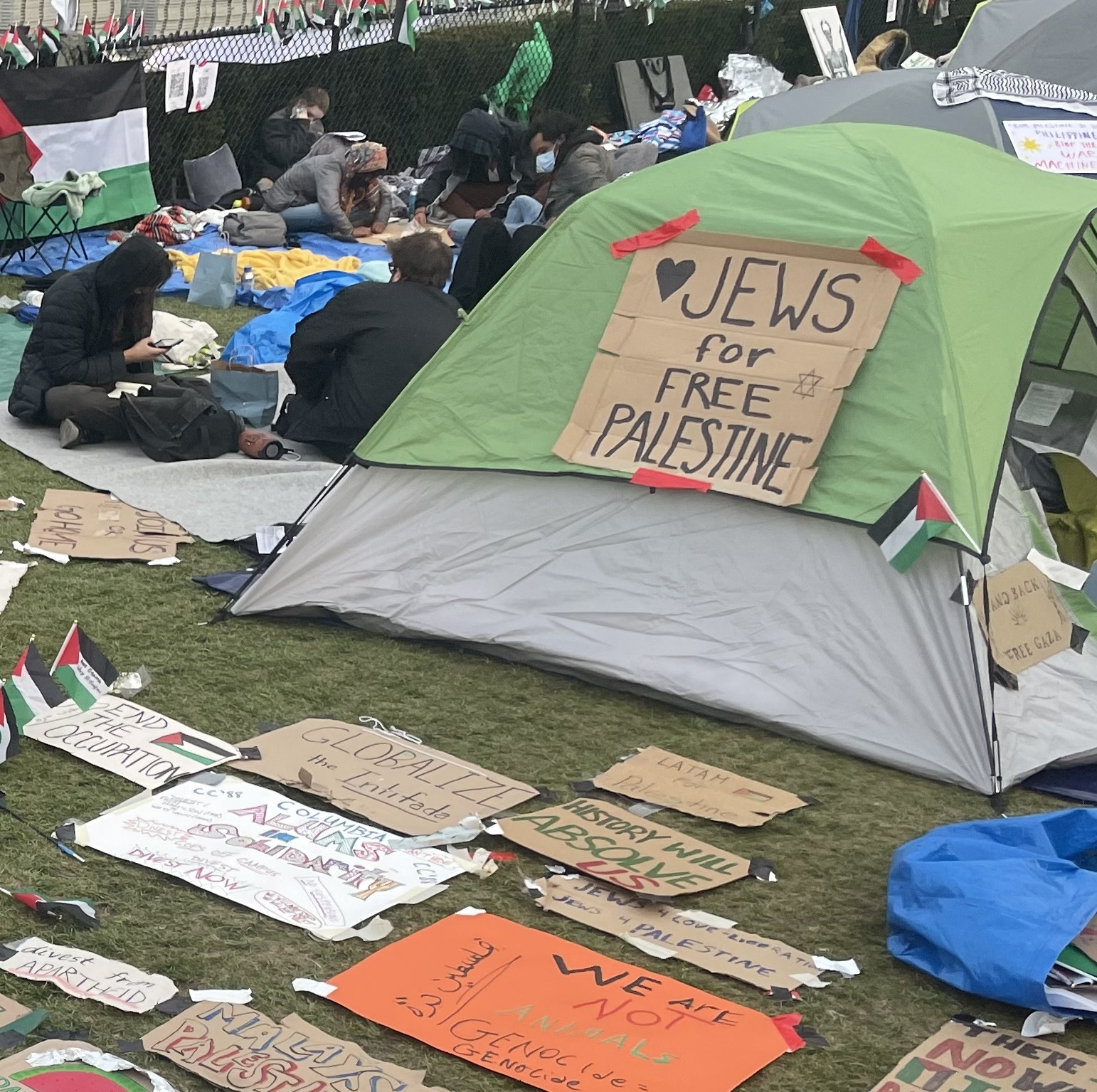
"Jews for free Palestine" sign on a tent at the Gaza Solidarity Encampment at Columbia University. There were Jewish affiliates who supported the demands of Columbia University Apartheid Divest, which formed after the university suspended Jewish Voice for Peace and Students for Justice in Palestine.

Records of Jewish Americans criticizing Israeli treatment of Palestinians date back to the establishment of the State of Israel in 1948. During the 1950s, Israel pressured Jewish institutions in the United States, such as the American Jewish Committee, to demote figures critical of the newly-stablished state.

In the United States, pro-Palestinian activist groups often have Palestinian and Jewish leadership. Jewish Voice for Peace is among the largest and best known pro-Palestinian Jewish organizations in the world. Another major pro-Palestinian Jewish organization is IfNotNow.

=== Uruguay ===
An informal group of Uruguayan Jews assembled in 2025 to demand the Uruguayan government end diplomatic relations with Israel due to the Gaza genocide, signing a collective letter and giving several interviews to the press.

== Orthodox Judaism ==
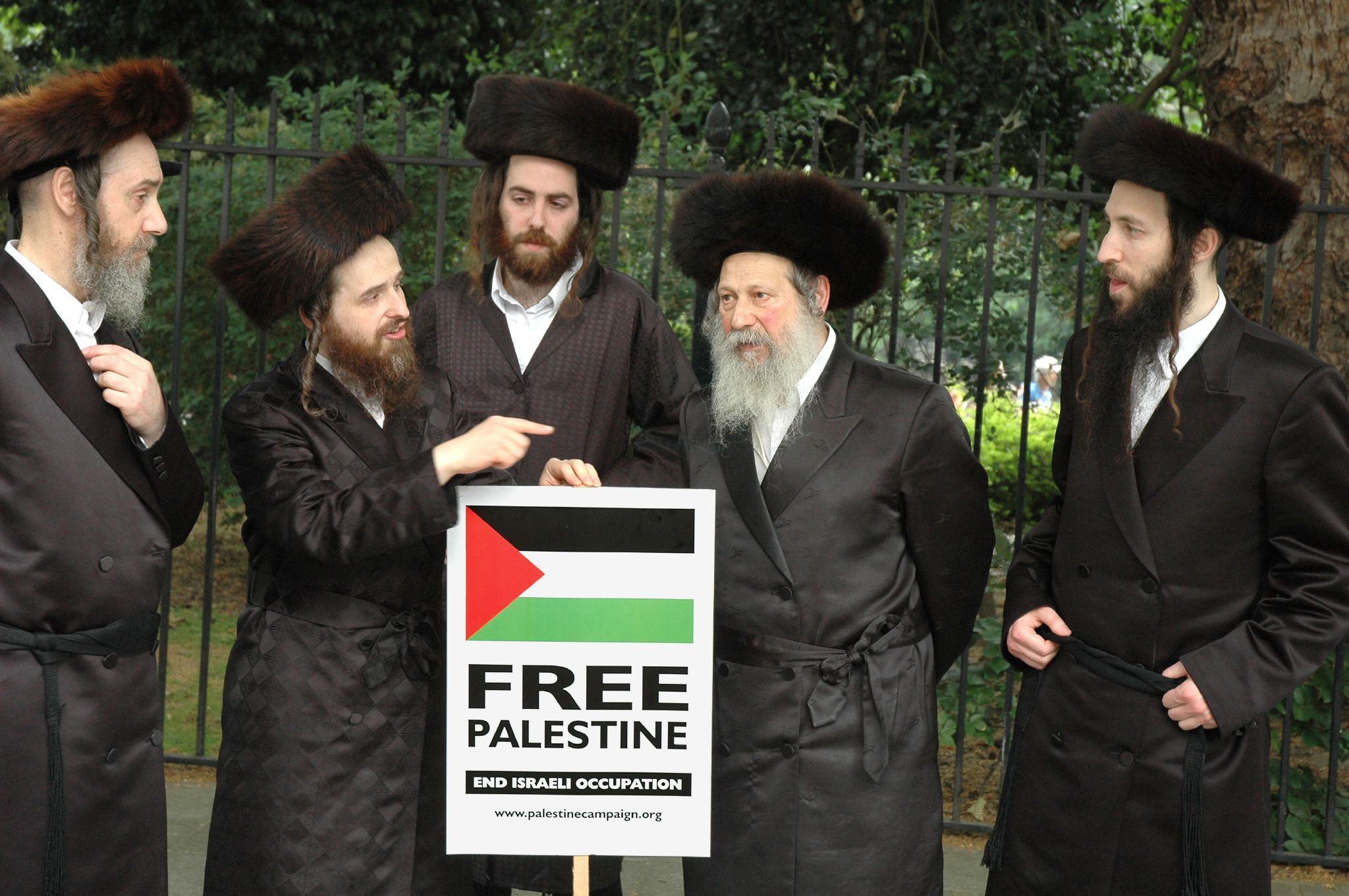
Members of Neturei Karta protest for Palestine, June 2005.

Orthodox Jewish opposition to Zionism often comes from Haredi and Hasidic Jews, who oppose Zionism for theological reasons. Orthodox anti-Zionism dates to the 1800s. Some Haredi and Hasidic anti-Zionists have also expressed pro-Palestinian sentiment, most notably the Haredi anti-Zionist group Neturei Karta. Despite living in Jerusalem, Neturei Karta members speak Yiddish rather than Hebrew and have refused Israeli citizenship. Following the Balfour Declaration, in the 1920s in Mandatory Palestine, some Orthodox Jews attempted to gain Palestinian Arab support in their opposition to Zionism.

Some Orthodox Jewish Zionists have also advocated for Palestinian rights. Yeshayahu Leibowitz was a prominent twentieth century Orthodox Jewish advocate for Palestinian rights. He controversially advocated for a unilateral withdrawal from the territories that were occupied after the 1967 war on account of the harm that occupation could bring to Israeli society.

== See also ==
- List of Jewish anti-Zionist organizations
- List of pro‑Palestinian advocacy organizations
- Boycott from Within
- Jewish anti-racism
- Jews for Justice for Palestinians
- Parting Ways: Jewishness and the Critique of Zionism
- Palestinian Jews
- Reform anti-Zionism
