= International Jewish Anti-Zionist Network =

American network of anti-Zionist Jews

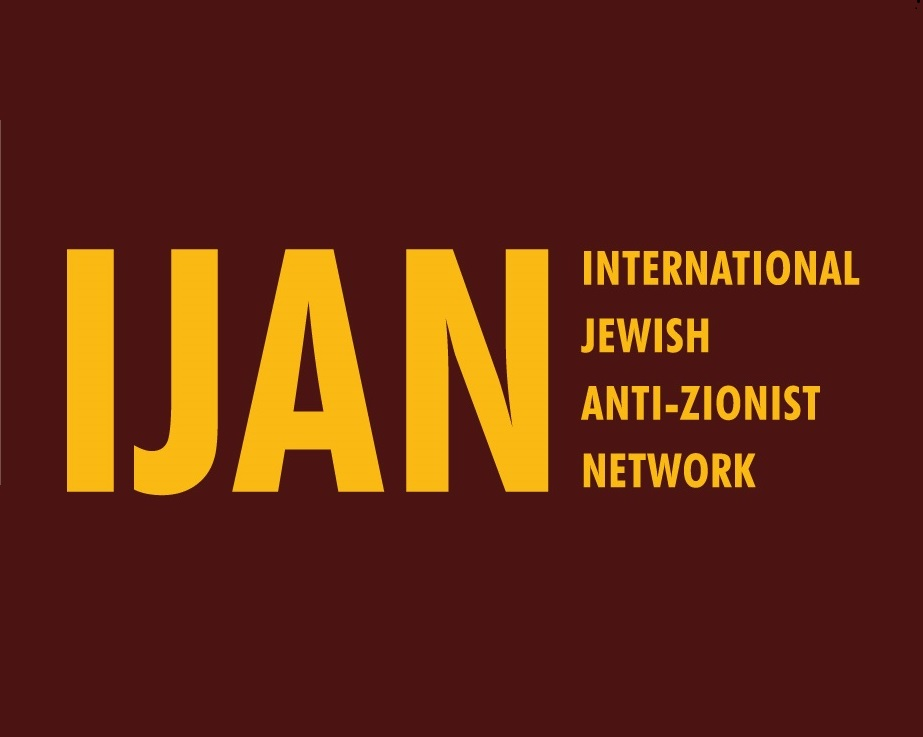
- Abbreviation: IJAN
- Formation: 2008; 18 years ago
- Founder: Sara Kershnar
- Type: Network
- Purpose: To oppose Zionism and the State of Israel
- Website: www.ijan.org

The International Jewish Anti-Zionist Network (IJAN) is an American network of anti-Zionist Jews pledged to "oppose Zionism and the State of Israel."

== Policies and membership ==
Sara Kershnar and others founded the International Jewish Anti-Zionist Network in 2008.

The IJAN views Zionism as a racist movement, and Israel as an apartheid state. The charter of the organization states "[w]e are an international network of Jews who are uncompromisingly committed to struggles for human emancipation, of which the liberation of the Palestinian people and land is an indispensable part. Our commitment is to the dismantling of Israeli apartheid, the return of Palestinian refugees, and the ending of the Israeli colonization of historic Palestine." It calls for the unconditional freeing of all Palestinian prisoners in Israel. The group has also opposed the wars in Iraq and Afghanistan, capitalism, and Islamophobia.

Prominent members of IJAN include feminist activist Selma James and the late Holocaust survivor Hajo Meyer. It comprises groups in the United States, Canada, India, Argentina, and several European countries.

== Activities ==
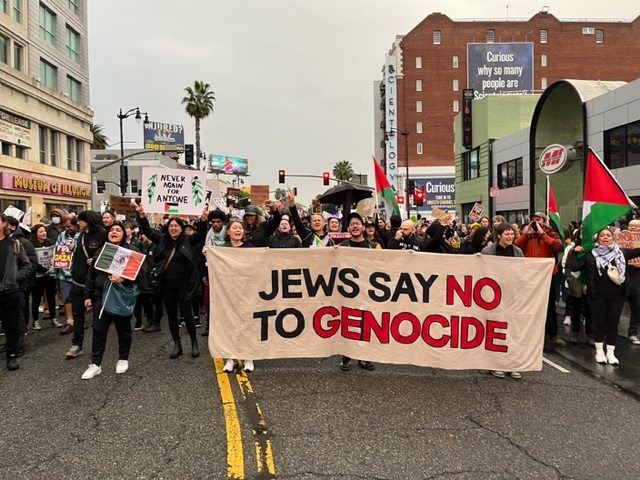
'Jews Say No to Genocide' protest in Hollywood

During the 2008–2009 Gaza War six members chained themselves to the Israeli consulate in Los Angeles, California, while around 40 others protested in front, shutting it down for two hours. Members of IJAN participated in a protest in London at the same time.

In 2010, Ireland's national trade-union federation invited the Network to a conference in Dublin about the Israeli-Palestinian conflict.

IJAN member and Auschwitz survivor Hajo Meyer, author of The End of Judaism: An Ethical Tradition Betrayed, was a key speaker in IJAN's 2010–11 "Never Again – For Anyone" tour, with talks in the UK and Ireland.

In 2011, IJAN was one of a number of organizations that organized a 13-city speaking tour of the United States which, according to The Jerusalem Post, "compares Israel's relations with the Palestinians to the Nazis' treatment of Jews during the Holocaust."

In November 2012, members of the IJAN participated in a protest against a meeting of the Jewish National Fund in Toronto.

== Third party views ==
Irish academic David Landy describes IJAN as one of the few Jewish organizations not to "sideline" anti-Zionism, "believing Zionism to be the underlying problem that must be tackled in order to achieve Palestinian liberation and incidentally reclaim the Jewish commitment to liberation."

The Anti-Defamation League (ADL) has said that although the International Jewish Anti-Zionist Network does not organise "a significant number of events", it has an important role "in creating policy and setting anti-Israel agendas."

In 2010, The Jerusalem Post correspondent Jonny Paul characterised IJAN as a "small radical fringe group".

== See also ==
- Jewish pro-Palestinian activism
