= Land for peace =

Legal interpretation in the Arab-Israeli conflict

Land for peace is a legalistic interpretation of the 1967 UN Security Council Resolution 242 which has been used as the basis of subsequent Arab–Israeli peace making. The name Land for Peace is derived from the wording of the resolution's first operative paragraph which affirms that peace should include the application of two principles: Withdrawal of Israeli forces (Giving Up Land), and Termination of all claims or states of belligerency (Making Peace). Since the resolution stipulates that both principles should apply, they can be viewed jointly as giving up land for peace, referred to more concisely as "land for peace".

This interpretation is widely contested because it implies that Israeli withdrawal is linked to its neighbours' willingness to formally make peace. Competing interpretations of the resolution regard Israel as being obligated to withdraw unilaterally from all territories captured in 1967. Operative paragraph 1 of Resolution 242 reads as follows:

1. Affirms that the fulfillment of Charter principles requires the establishment of a just and lasting peace in the Middle East which should include the application of both the following principles:

(i) Withdrawal of Israel armed forces from territories occupied in the recent conflict;

(ii) Termination of all claims or states of belligerency and respect for and acknowledgement of the sovereignty, territorial integrity and political independence of every State in the area and their right to live in peace within secure and recognized boundaries free from threats or acts of force;

In 1976, when Lord Caradon was asked about the concessions the Arab states would have to make to Israel as part of an overall settlement, he said "Well, that's perfectly obvious if you read again the principles of 242, which have been accepted by Egypt, Jordan, Syria and Saudi Arabia, and in effect by Israel. The provision is that if there is an adequate withdrawal, all states in the area must be free to live within secure and recognized boundaries, free from force and threat of force. So it is an acceptance that Israel has a right to exist, just as they would have a right to their homeland, and have a right to exist. This is the essential bargain that we are proposing. It's not a new thing, it's been going since 1967.

== Peace treaties ==
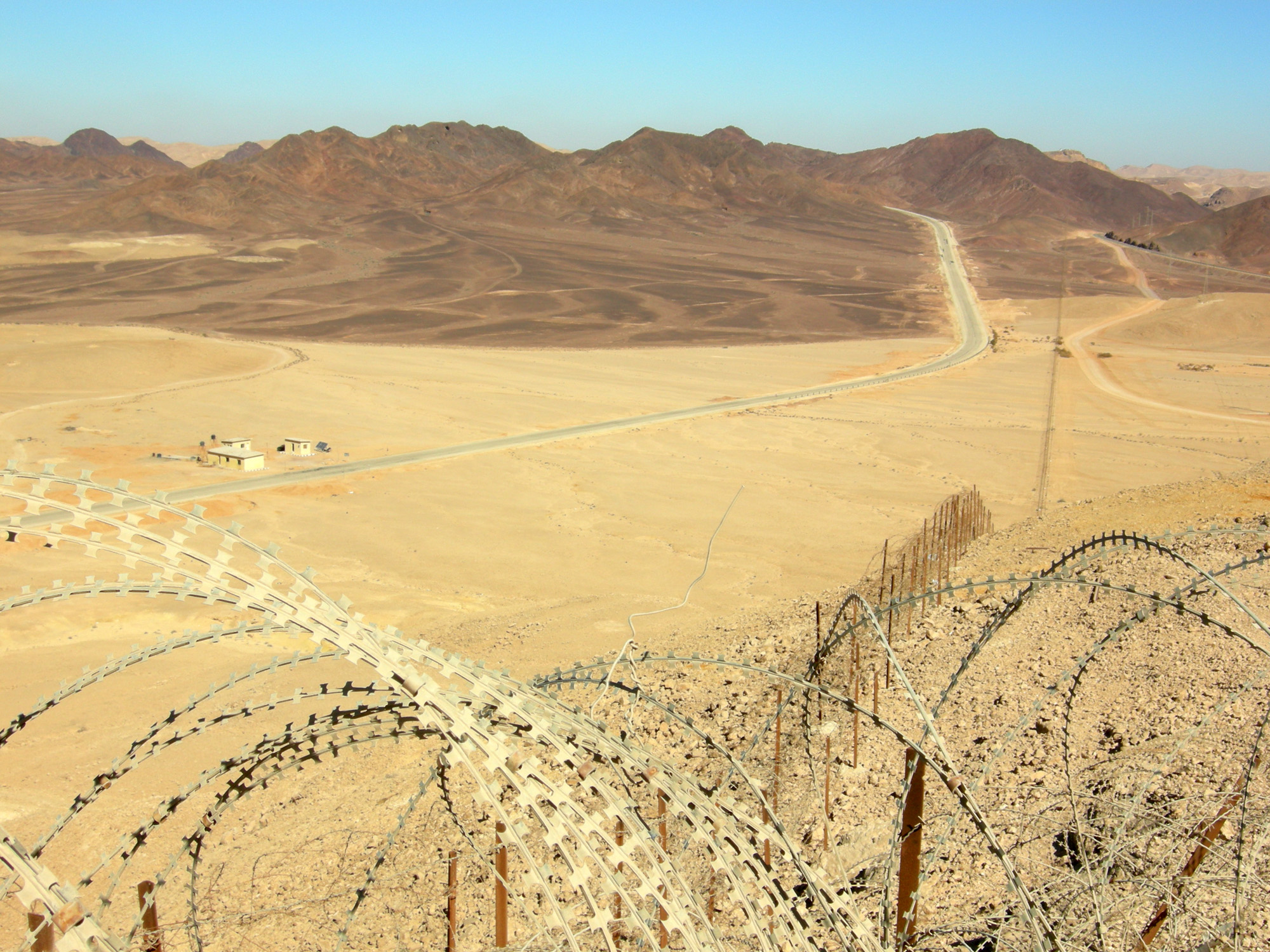
Egypt–Israel border, looking north from the Eilat Mountains

On 19 June 1967, shortly after the Six-Day War, the Israeli government voted to return the Sinai to Egypt and the Golan Heights to Syria in exchange for a permanent peace settlement and a demilitarization of the returned territories. This decision was not made public at the time, nor was it conveyed to any Arab state. Israeli Foreign Minister Abba Eban has said that it had been conveyed, but there seems to be no solid evidence to corroborate his claim; no formal peace proposal was made either directly or indirectly by Israel. The Americans, who were briefed of the Cabinet's decision by Eban, were not asked to convey it to Cairo and Damascus as official peace proposals, nor were they given indications that Israel expected a reply. Eban rejected the prospect of a mediated peace, insisting on the need for direct negotiations with the Arab governments.

The Arab position, as it emerged in September 1967 at the Khartoum Arab Summit, was to reject any peaceful settlement with the State of Israel. The eight participating states—Egypt, Syria, Jordan, Lebanon, Iraq, Algeria, Kuwait, and Sudan—passed a resolution that would later become known as the "three no's": there would be no peace, no recognition and no negotiation with Israel. Prior to that, King Hussein of Jordan had stated that he could not rule out a possibility of a "real, permanent peace" between Israel and the Arab states.

The first application of the land for peace formula was Israel's peace treaty with Egypt in 1979, under which Israel withdrew from the Sinai as part of a comprehensive peace agreement facilitated by economic assistance to both sides from the United States.

In 1994, a comprehensive agreement invoking resolutions 242 and 338 formed the basis of the Israel Jordan peace treaty whereby both sides redeployed to their respective sides of the agreed international boundary.

== Arab–Israeli peace diplomacy and treaties ==
- Paris Peace Conference, 1919
- Faisal–Weizmann Agreement (1919)
- 1949 Armistice Agreements
- Camp David Accords (1978)
- Egypt–Israel peace treaty (1979)
- Madrid Conference of 1991
- Oslo Accords (1993)
- Israel–Jordan peace treaty (1994)
- Camp David 2000 Summit
- Israeli–Palestinian peace process
- Projects working for peace among Israelis and Arabs
- List of Middle East peace proposals
- International law and the Arab–Israeli conflict
