= Faculty for Justice in Palestine =

US network of faculty and staff groups

- Abbreviation: FJP / FSJP
- Formation: 2023–2024
- Type: Academic network
- Purpose: Support for Palestinian liberation, student activism, and the Boycott, Divestment and Sanctions (BDS) movement
- Region served: United States
- Members: 120+ campus chapters
- Website: www.fjp-network.org

Faculty for Justice in Palestine (FJP), also known as Faculty and Staff for Justice in Palestine (FSJP), is a network of faculty and staff groups in the United States. It was founded during the 2023–2024 academic year amid campus activism surrounding the Gaza war. By 2025, the organization reported more than 120 campus chapters nationwide. The group positions itself on its website as a collective of academics supporting Palestinian liberation, student activism, and the BDS movement.

== History ==
FJP emerged in late 2023 as a faculty counterpart to Students for Justice in Palestine (SJP), following the October events of the Gaza war. Chapters quickly spread across U.S. campuses, with activity reported at Stanford University, the Claremont Colleges, George Washington University, Rutgers University, Yale University, and the University of Chicago.

At Dartmouth College, the chapter formed in early 2024 when faculty and staff, described by founding member Udi Greenberg as seeking "an alternative voice on campus for discussion of the conflict", organized in response to campus events and institutional silencing.

== Organizational structure ==
The organization describes itself as a decentralized network, with chapters operating independently but connected through shared statements, petitions, and teaching resources circulated by the national network.

Although FJP does not formally identify national leaders, a report by InfluenceWatch noted the existence of a national steering committee consisting of Sophia Azeb (University of California, Santa Cruz), Lara Deeb (Claremont Consortium), Fida Adley (Georgetown University), Greta LaFleur (Yale University), Nadine Naber (University of Illinois Chicago), and Neferti Tadiar (Barnard College).

At the campus level, leadership has often emerged from founding collectives:

- At Stanford, David Palumbo-Liu (Comparative Literature) is credited with conceptualizing the FJP model, and Anna Bigelow (Religious Studies) is listed as a founding member. Jonathan Rosa (Education) has also participated in public FJP events.
- At the Claremont Colleges, more than 40 faculty formed a chapter in 2024 after an earlier solidarity initiative involving over 180 faculty and departments.
- At George Washington University, professors Peter Calloway, Helen DeVinney, Amr Madkour, Sara Matthiesen, and Dara Orenstein co-authored an op-ed announcing the chapter's formation.

== Activities ==
FJP describes itself as a plural and democratic network committed to mobilizing academic solidarity with Palestine. Its stated goals include supporting SJP chapters and student activism, promoting academic boycotts of Israeli institutions, opposing disciplinary measures against pro-Palestinian activists, and organizing teach-ins, vigils, memorials, and public letters related to Gaza and Palestinian issues.

In its Spring 2025 Communiqué, the national network reiterated its commitment to academic freedom and to solidarity with anti-colonial and Palestinian movements, accusing university administrations of having "sacrificed students, faculty, and staff in misguided acts of preparatory obedience."

Local FJP chapters have engaged in a range of campus actions and public demonstrations. In February 2024, the Stanford University chapter drew national media attention after organizing a campus memorial for Gazan academics and artists killed in the war. Two months later, the establishment of an FJP chapter at George Washington University generated widespread debate across student and national outlets. Later that year, during the 2024 UCLA pro-Palestinian encampment, the university's FJP chapter called for a labor strike to protest the university and law enforcement responses to the encampment.

== Reception ==
Supporters describe FJP as an effort to defend academic freedom, foster anti-colonial solidarity, and protect pro-Palestinian student expression. The organization's materials state that its chapters focus on "creating educational spaces" and "supporting students facing disciplinary or political pressure." Critics argue that the organization contributes to campus hostility. A 2024 report by the AMCHA Initiative asserted that universities with FJP chapters experienced significantly higher rates of physical assaults and threats targeting Jewish students, describing the group as pivotal in escalating campus antisemitism. The report's findings were highlighted in commentators and media outlets including The Media Line and the Jewish Journal, although critics of AMCHA's methodology have previously questioned how the organization defines and tracks anti-Zionist speech.
