= Ury =

Ury or URY may refer to:

== Places ==
- River Ury, in Aberdeenshire, Scotland
- Ury House, Stonehaven, Kincardineshire, Scotland, an historic mansion
- Ury, Seine-et-Marne, a commune in the Seine-et-Marne département of France
- Ury, West Virginia, United States, an unincorporated community

== Acronym ==
- University Radio York, a student radio station at the University of York, England

== People ==
- David Ury (born 1973), American actor and comedian
- Else Ury (1877–1943), German writer and children's book author
- John Ury (died 1741), white itinerant teacher suspected of being a Catholic priest and a Spanish spy during the 1741 New York Slave Insurrection
- Lesser Ury (1861–1931), German Impressionist painter and printmaker
- Logan Ury (born 1987 or 1988), American behavior expert, author, and dating coach
- Lon Ury (1877–1918), Major League Baseball first baseman during the end of the 1903 season
- Marian Ury (1932–1995), American professor of Japanese literature
- Peter Ury (1920–1976), German Jewish composer, moved to England in 1939
- Tanya Ury (born 1951), activist, author and artist, daughter of Peter Ury
- William Ury, American author, anthropologist, and negotiation expert
- Ury Benador, pen name of Romanian playwright and prose writer Simon Moise Grinberg (1895–1971)

== Codes and marks ==
- Uruguay ISO 3166-1 Alpha-3 country code (URY)
- Gurayat Domestic Airport IATA code (URY)
- Orya language ISO 639-3 code (ury)
- Union Railway of Memphis shipping mark (URY) - see List of reporting marks: U

== See also ==
- Urey (disambiguation)
- Uri (disambiguation)
- Urie (disambiguation)
