= Etching =

Intaglio printmaking technique

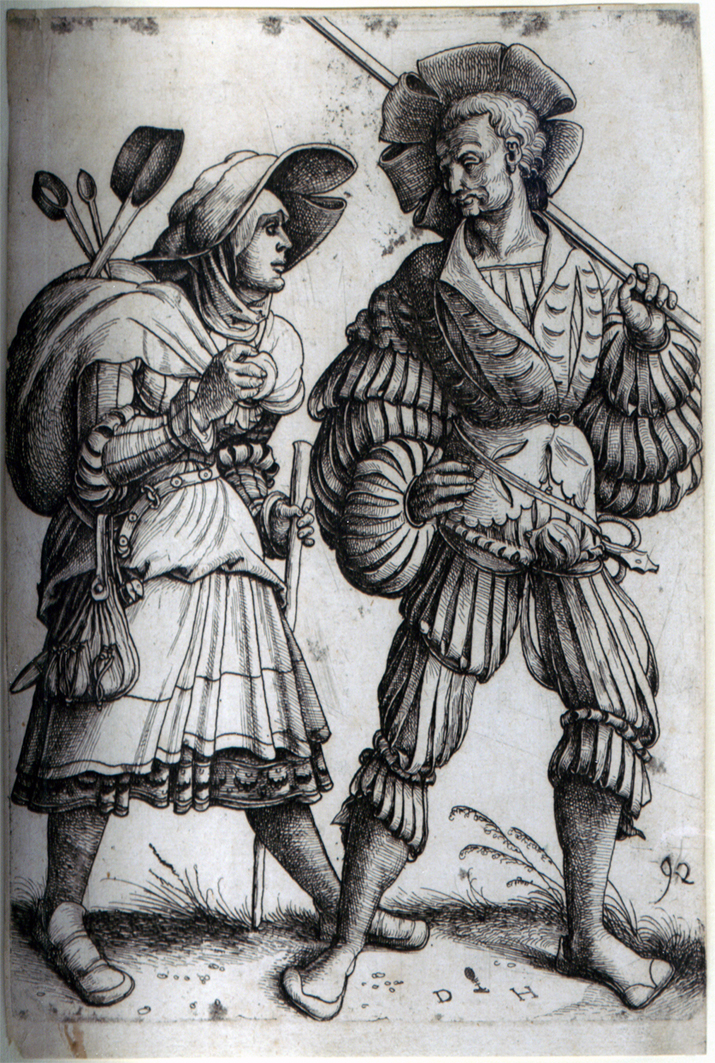
The Soldier and his Wife. Etching by Daniel Hopfer, who is believed to have been the first to apply the technique to printmaking.

Etching is traditionally the process of using strong acid or mordant to cut into the unprotected parts of a metal surface to create a design in intaglio (incised) in the metal. In modern manufacturing, other chemicals may be used on other types of material. As a method of printmaking, it is, along with engraving, the most important technique for old master prints, and remains in wide use today. In a number of modern variants such as microfabrication etching and photochemical milling, it is a crucial technique in modern technology, including circuit boards.

In traditional pure etching, a metal plate (usually of copper, zinc or steel) is covered with a waxy ground which is resistant to acid. The artist then scratches off the ground with a pointed etching needle where the artist wants a line to appear in the finished piece, exposing the bare metal. The échoppe, a tool with a slanted oval section, is also used for "swelling" lines. The plate is then dipped in a bath of acid, known as the mordant (French for "biting") or etchant, or has acid washed over it. The acid "bites" into the metal (it undergoes a redox reaction) to a depth depending on time and acid strength, leaving behind the drawing (as carved into the wax) on the metal plate. The remaining ground is then cleaned off the plate. For first and renewed uses the plate is inked in any chosen non-corrosive ink all over and the surface ink drained and wiped clean, leaving ink in the etched forms.

The plate is then put through a high-pressure printing press together with a sheet of paper (often moistened to soften it). The paper picks up the ink from the etched lines, making a print. The process can be repeated many times; typically several hundred impressions (copies) could be printed before the plate shows much sign of wear. The work on the plate can be added to or repaired by re-waxing and further etching; such an etching (plate) may have been used in more than one state.

Etching has often been combined with other intaglio techniques such as engraving (e.g., Rembrandt) or aquatint (e.g., Francisco Goya). The French name "eau forte" (lit. "strong water") for the technique and the resulting prints was sometimes used in English.

== History ==
=== Origin ===
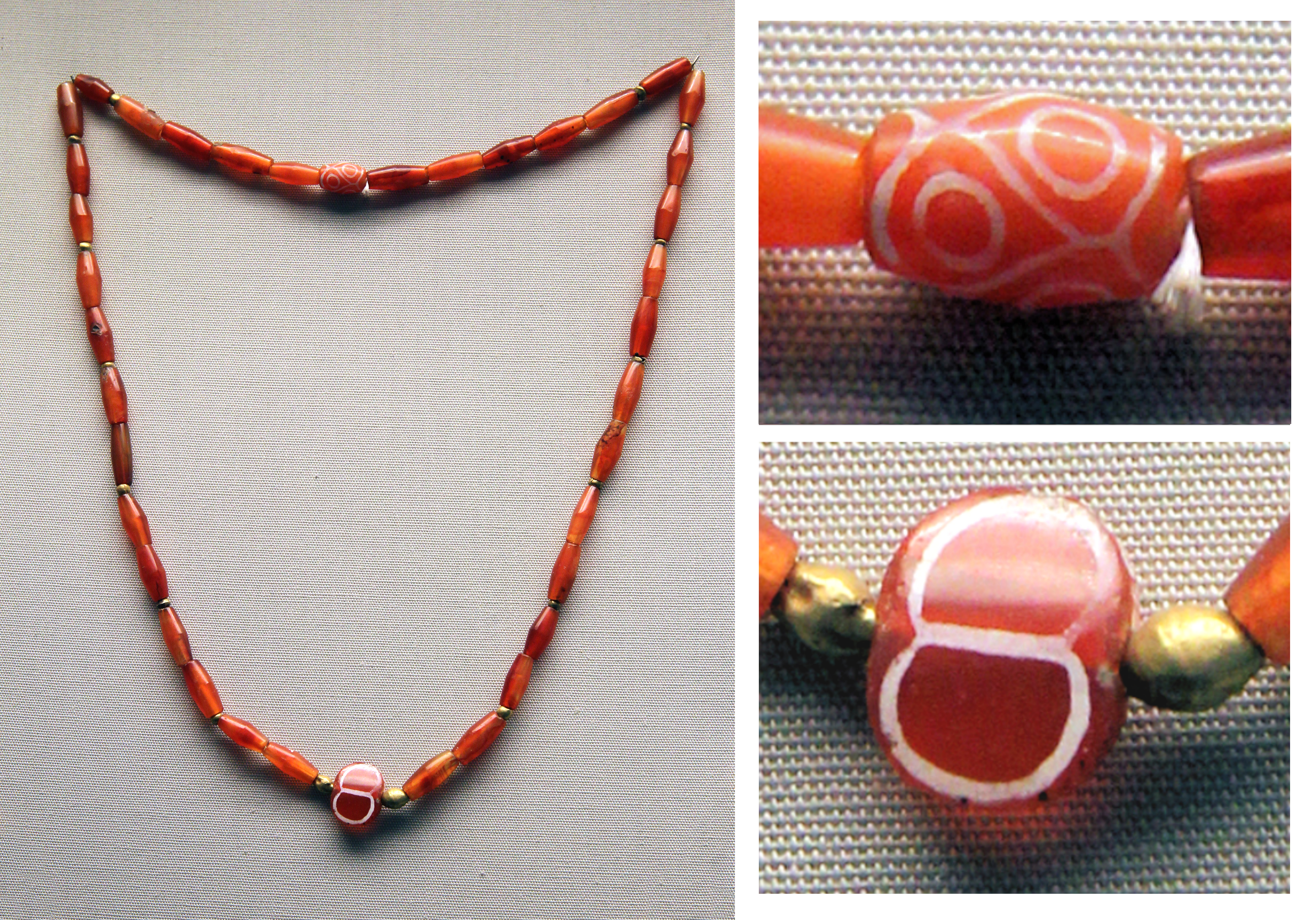
The etched carnelian beads in this necklace from the Royal Cemetery of Ur dating to the First Dynasty of Ur (2600-2500 BCE) were probably imported from the Indus Valley.

==== Etching in antiquity ====
Etching was already used in antiquity for decorative purposes. Etched carnelian beads are a type of ancient decorative beads made from carnelian with an etched design in white, which were probably manufactured by the Indus Valley civilization during the 3rd millennium BCE. They were made according to a technique of alkaline etching developed by the Harappans, and vast quantities of these beads were found in the archaeological sites of the Indus Valley civilization. They are considered as an important marker of ancient trade between the Indus Valley, Mesopotamia and even Ancient Egypt, as these precious and unique manufactured items circulated in great numbers between these geographical areas during the 3rd millennium BCE, and have been found in numerous tomb deposits. Sumerian kings, such as Shulgi c. 2000 BCE, also created etched carnelian beads for dedication purposes.

==== Early etching ====
Etching by goldsmiths and other metal-workers in order to decorate metal items such as guns, armour, cups and plates has been known in Europe since the Middle Ages at least, and may go back to antiquity. The elaborate decoration of armour, in Germany at least, was an art probably imported from Italy around the end of the 15th century—little earlier than the birth of etching as a printmaking technique. Printmakers from the German-speaking lands and Central Europe perfected the art and transmitted their skills over the Alps and across Europe.

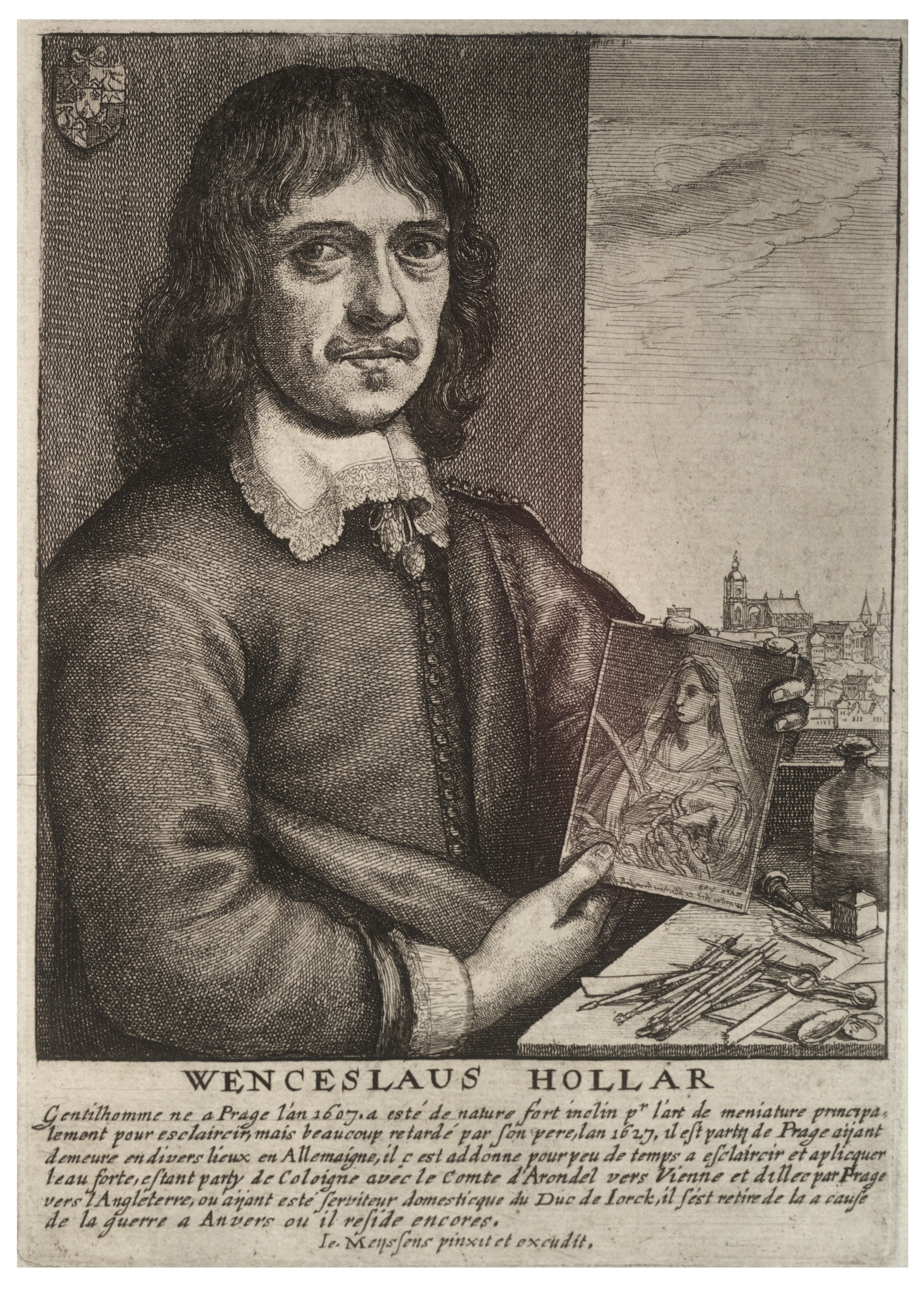
Self-portrait etched by Wenceslaus Hollar

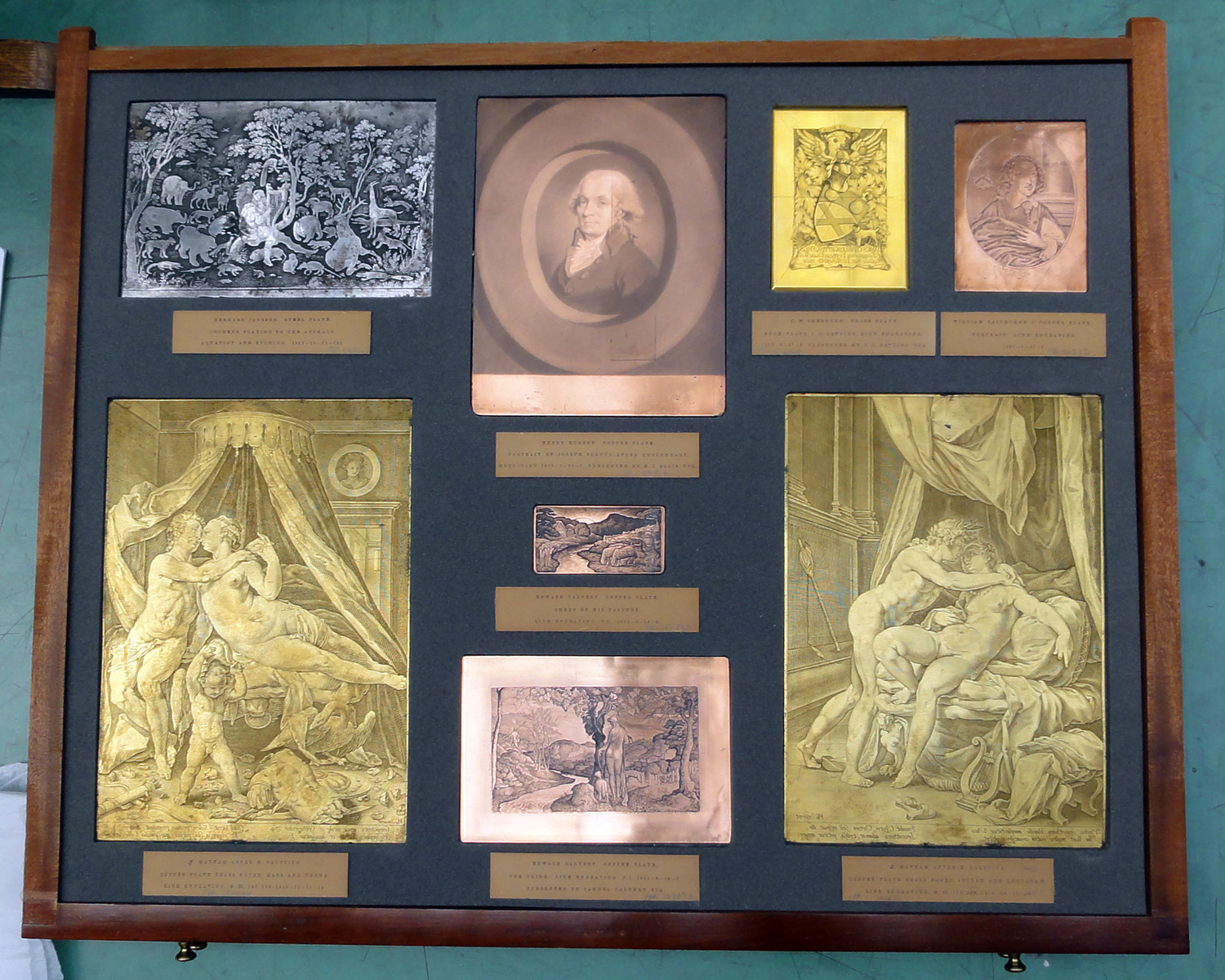
Selection of early etched printing plates from the British Museum

The process as applied to printmaking is believed to have been invented by Daniel Hopfer (c. 1470–1536) of Augsburg, Germany. Hopfer was a craftsman who decorated armour in this way, and applied the method to printmaking, using iron plates (many of which still exist). Apart from his prints, there are two proven examples of his work on armour: a shield from 1536 now in the Real Armeria of Madrid and a sword in the Germanisches Nationalmuseum of Nuremberg. An Augsburg horse armour in the German Historical Museum, Berlin, dating to between 1512 and 1515, is decorated with motifs from Hopfer's etchings and woodcuts, but this is no evidence that Hopfer himself worked on it, as his decorative prints were largely produced as patterns for other craftsmen in various media. The oldest dated etching is by Albrecht Dürer in 1515, although he returned to engraving after six etchings instead of developing the craft.

The switch to copper plates was probably made in Italy, and thereafter etching soon came to challenge engraving as the most popular medium for artists in printmaking. Its great advantage was that, unlike engraving where the difficult technique for using the burin requires special skill in metalworking, the basic technique for creating the image on the plate in etching is relatively easy to learn for an artist trained in drawing. On the other hand, the handling of the ground and acid need skill and experience, and are not without health and safety risks, as well as the risk of a ruined plate.

=== Callot's innovations: échoppe, hard ground, stopping-out ===
Jacques Callot (1592–1635) from Nancy in Lorraine (now part of France) made important technical advances in etching technique.

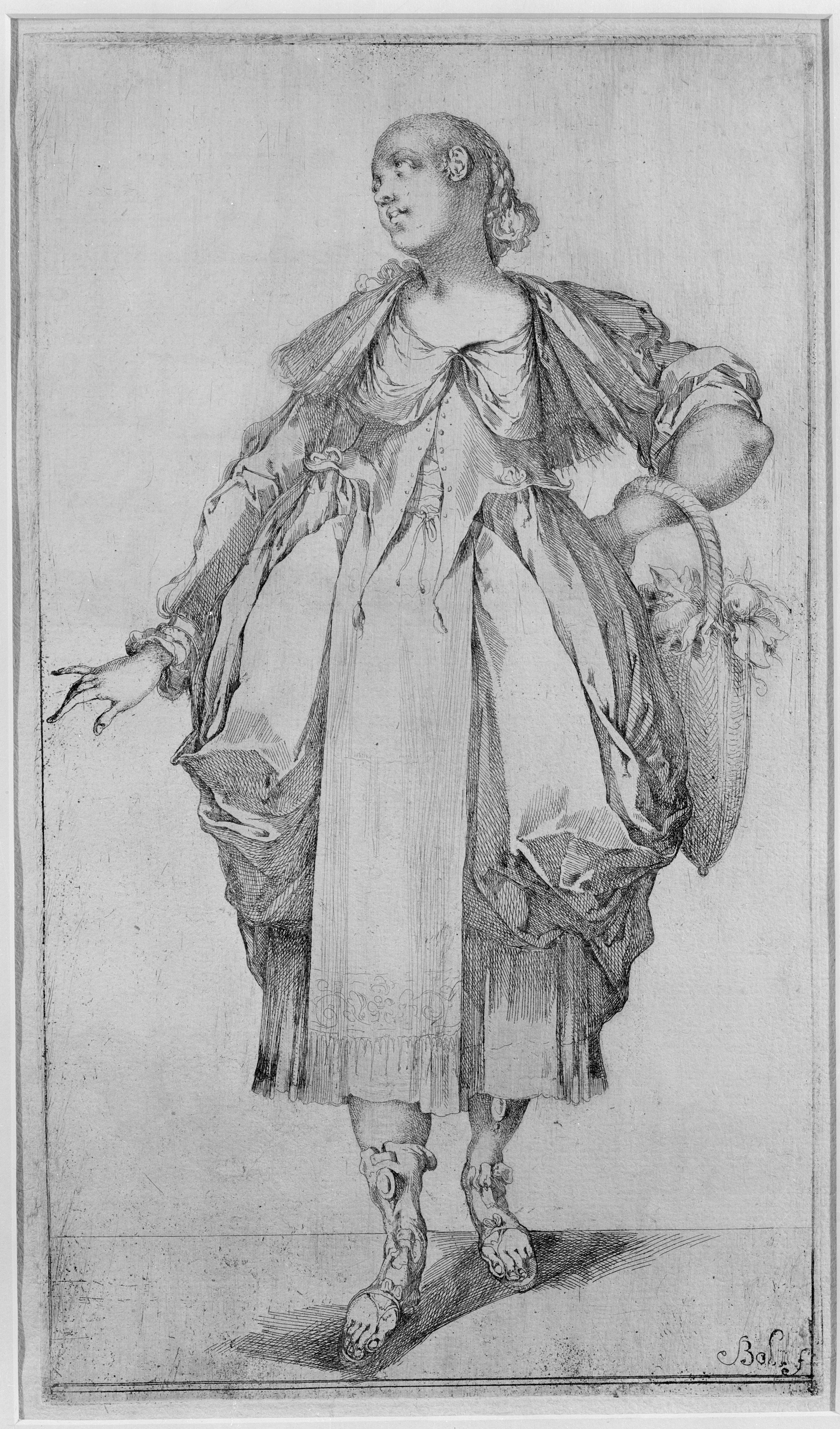
Etching by Jacques Bellange, Gardener with basket c. 1612

Callot also appears to have been responsible for an improved, harder, recipe for the etching ground, using lute-makers' varnish rather than a wax-based formula. This enabled lines to be more deeply bitten, prolonging the life of the plate in printing, and also greatly reducing the risk of "foul-biting", where acid gets through the ground to the plate where it is not intended to, producing spots or blotches on the image. Previously the risk of foul-biting had always been at the back of an etcher's mind, preventing too much time on a single plate that risked being ruined in the biting process. Now etchers could do the highly detailed work that was previously the monopoly of engravers, and Callot made full use of the new possibilities.

Callot also made more extensive and sophisticated use of multiple "stoppings-out" than previous etchers had done. This is the technique of letting the acid bite lightly over the whole plate, then stopping-out those parts of the work which the artist wishes to keep light in tone by covering them with ground before bathing the plate in acid again. He achieved unprecedented subtlety in effects of distance and light and shade by careful control of this process. Most of his prints were relatively small—up to about six inches or 15 cm on their longest dimension, but packed with detail.

One of his followers, the Parisian Abraham Bosse, spread Callot's innovations all over Europe with the first published manual of etching, which was translated into Italian, Dutch, German and English.

The 17th century was the great age of etching, with Rembrandt, Giovanni Benedetto Castiglione and many other masters. In the 18th century, Piranesi, Tiepolo and Daniel Chodowiecki were the best of a smaller number of fine etchers.

In the mid-19th century interest in etching revived, especially in Britain and France, partly as a reaction against the industrial associations of lithography and reproductive engraving: because the design was drawn into a wax ground rather than cut into the plate, etching was seen as closer to drawing and to the artist's own hand. In 1862 the publisher Alfred Cadart and the printer Auguste Delâtre founded the Société des Aquafortistes to promote the medium; its members included Félix Bracquemond, and Charles Meryon's views of Paris served the movement as a model. The etching revival spread to Britain and the United States. James McNeill Whistler, who made nearly 500 etchings over five decades, published the Thames Set in 1871 and two sets of Venice etchings in the 1880s; the Metropolitan Museum of Art describes him as among the most inventive and influential printmakers in history. Through Eugène Delâtre, whose colour etching influenced Pablo Picasso's first prints, the revival carried etching into 20th-century modernism. Etching is still widely practiced today.

== Variants ==
Aquatint uses acid-resistant resin to achieve tonal effects.

Soft-ground etching uses a special softer ground. The artist places a piece of paper (or cloth etc. in modern uses) over the ground and draws on it. The print resembles a drawing. Soft ground can also be used to capture the texture or pattern of fabrics or furs pressed into the soft surface.

Other materials that are not manufactured specifically for etching can be used as grounds or resists. Examples including printing ink, paint, spray paint, oil pastels, candle or bees wax, tacky vinyl or stickers, and permanent markers.

There are some new non-toxic grounds on the market that work differently than typical hard or soft grounds.

Relief etching was invented by William Blake in about 1788, and he has been almost the only artist to use it in its original form. However, from 1880 to 1950 a photo-mechanical ("line-block") variant was the dominant form of commercial printing for images. A similar process to etching, but printed as a relief print, so it is the "white" background areas which are exposed to the acid, and the areas to print "black" which are covered with ground. Blake's exact technique remains controversial. He used the technique to print texts and images together, writing the text and drawing lines with an acid-resistant medium.

Carborundum etching (sometimes called carbograph printing) was invented in the mid-20th century by American artists who worked for the WPA. In this technique, a metal plate is first covered with silicon carbide grit and run through an etching press; then a design is drawn on the roughened plate using an acid-resistant medium. After immersion in an acid bath, the resulting plate is printed as a relief print. The roughened surface of the relief permits considerable tonal range, and it is possible to attain a high relief that results in strongly embossed prints.

== Printmaking technique in detail ==
Steps in the typical technique

A waxy acid-resist, known as a ground, is applied to a metal plate, most often copper or zinc but steel plate is another medium with different qualities. There are two common types of ground: hard ground and soft ground.

Hard ground can be applied in two ways. Solid hard ground comes in a hard waxy block. To apply hard ground of this variety, the plate to be etched is placed upon a hot-plate (set at 70 °C, 158 °F), a kind of metal worktop that is heated up. The plate heats up and the ground is applied by hand, melting onto the plate as it is applied. The ground is spread over the plate as evenly as possible using a roller. Once applied the etching plate is removed from the hot-plate and allowed to cool which hardens the ground.

After the ground has hardened the artist "smokes" the plate, classically with 3 beeswax tapers, applying the flame to the plate to darken the ground and make it easier to see what parts of the plate are exposed. Smoking not only darkens the plate but adds a small amount of wax. Afterwards the artist uses a sharp tool to scratch into the ground, exposing the metal.

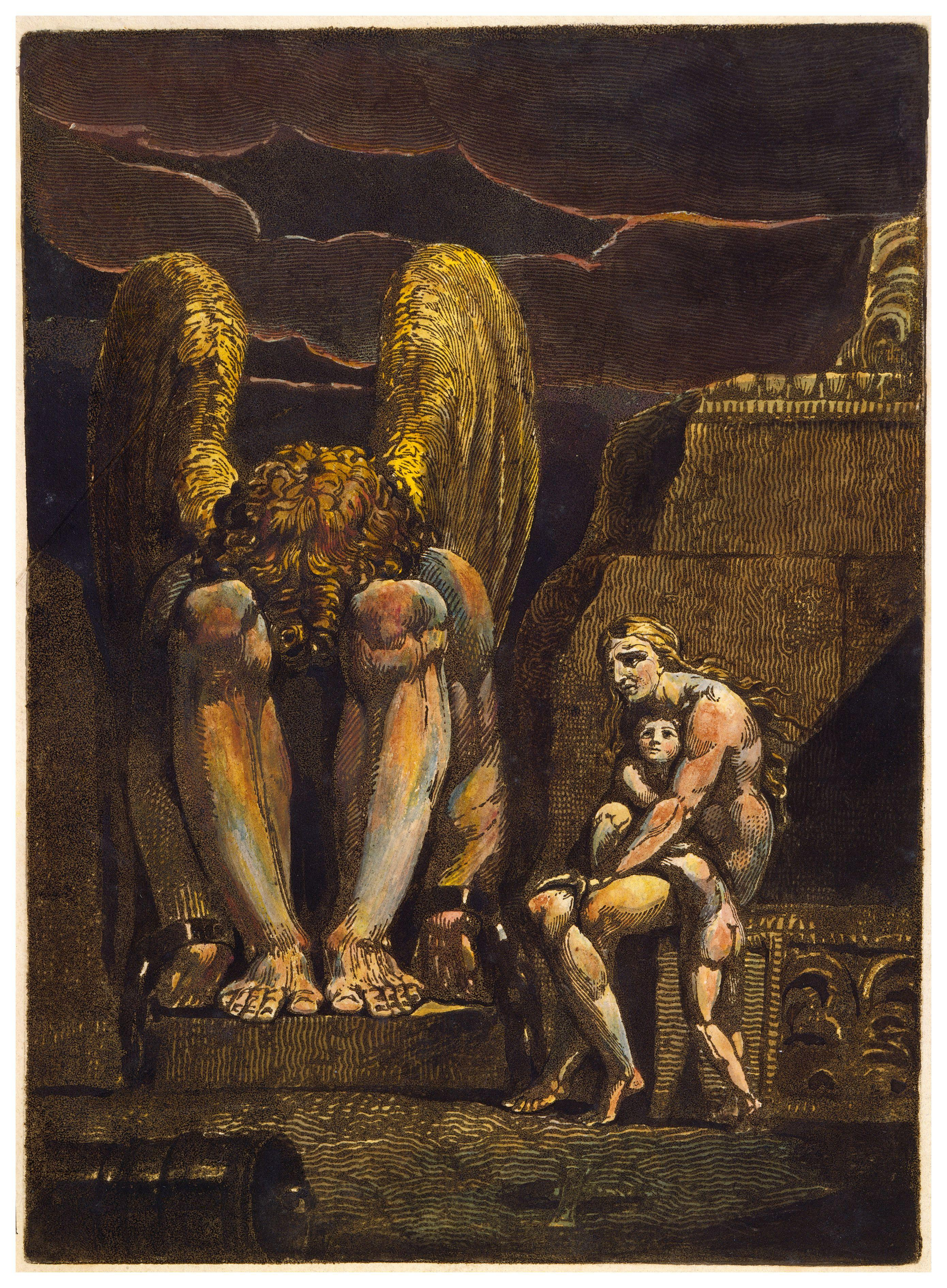
Relief etching by William Blake, frontispiece to America a Prophecy (Copy A, printed 1795)

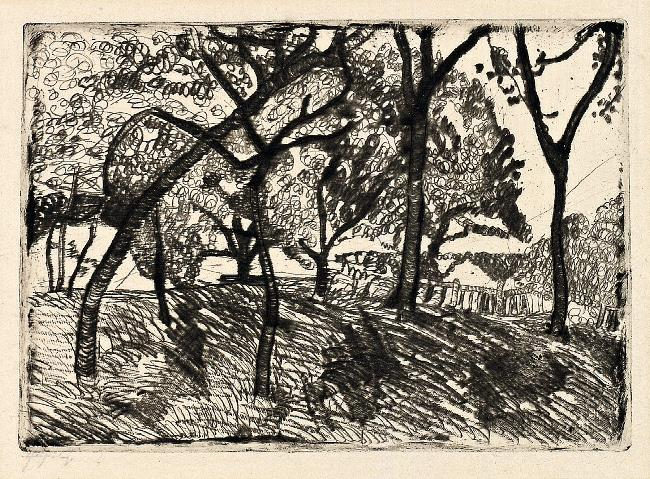
Landscape under Trees, etching by Paula Modersohn-Becker, c. 1902

The second way to apply hard ground is by liquid hard ground. This comes in a can and is applied with a brush upon the plate to be etched. Exposed to air the hard ground will harden. Some printmakers use oil/tar based asphaltum or bitumen as hard ground, although often bitumen is used to protect steel plates from rust and copper plates from aging.

Soft ground also comes in liquid form and is allowed to dry but it does not dry hard like hard ground and is impressionable. After the soft ground has dried the printmaker may apply materials such as leaves, objects, hand prints and so on which will penetrate the soft ground and expose the plate underneath.

The ground can also be applied in a fine mist, using powdered rosin or spraypaint. This process is called aquatint, and allows for the creation of tones, shadows, and solid areas of color.

The design is then drawn (in reverse) with an etching-needle or échoppe. An "echoppe" point can be made from an ordinary tempered steel etching needle, by grinding the point back on a carborundum stone, at a 45–60 degree angle. The "echoppe" works on the same principle that makes a fountain pen's line more attractive than a ballpoint's: The slight swelling variation caused by the natural movement of the hand "warms up" the line, and although hardly noticeable in any individual line, has a very attractive overall effect on the finished plate. It can be drawn with in the same way as an ordinary needle.

The plate is then completely submerged in a solution that eats away at the exposed metal. ferric chloride may be used for etching copper or zinc plates, whereas nitric acid may be used for etching zinc or steel plates. Typical solutions are 1 part FeCl_{3} to 1 part water and 1 part nitric to 3 parts water. The strength of the acid determines the speed of the etching process.

- The etching process is known as biting (see also spit-biting below).
- The waxy resist prevents the acid from biting the parts of the plate which have been covered.
- The longer the plate remains in the acid the deeper the "bites" become.

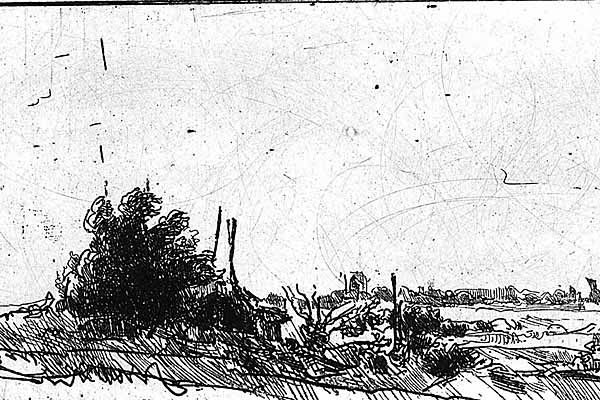
Example of etching

During the etching process the printmaker uses a bird feather or similar item to wave away bubbles and detritus produced by the dissolving process, from the surface of the plate, or the plate may be periodically lifted from the acid bath. If a bubble is allowed to remain on the plate then it will stop the acid biting into the plate where the bubble touches it. Zinc produces more bubbles much more rapidly than copper and steel and some artists use this to produce interesting round bubble-like circles within their prints for a Milky Way effect.

The detritus is powdery dissolved metal that fills the etched grooves and can also block the acid from biting evenly into the exposed plate surfaces. Another way to remove detritus from a plate is to place the plate to be etched face down within the acid upon plasticine balls or marbles, although the drawback of this technique is the exposure to bubbles and the inability to remove them readily.

For aquatinting a printmaker will often use a test strip of metal about a centimetre to three centimetres wide. The strip will be dipped into the acid for a specific number of minutes or seconds. The metal strip will then be removed and the acid washed off with water. Part of the strip will be covered in ground and then the strip is redipped into the acid and the process repeated. The ground will then be removed from the strip and the strip inked up and printed. This will show the printmaker the different degrees or depths of the etch, and therefore the strength of the ink color, based upon how long the plate is left in the acid.

The plate is removed from the acid and washed over with water to remove the acid. The ground is removed with a solvent such as turpentine. Turpentine is often removed from the plate using methylated spirits since turpentine is greasy and can affect the application of ink and the printing of the plate.

Spit-biting is a process whereby the printmaker will apply acid to a plate with a brush in certain areas of the plate. The plate may be aquatinted for this purpose or exposed directly to the acid. The process is known as "spit"-biting due to the use of saliva once used as a medium to dilute the acid, although gum arabic or water are now commonly used.

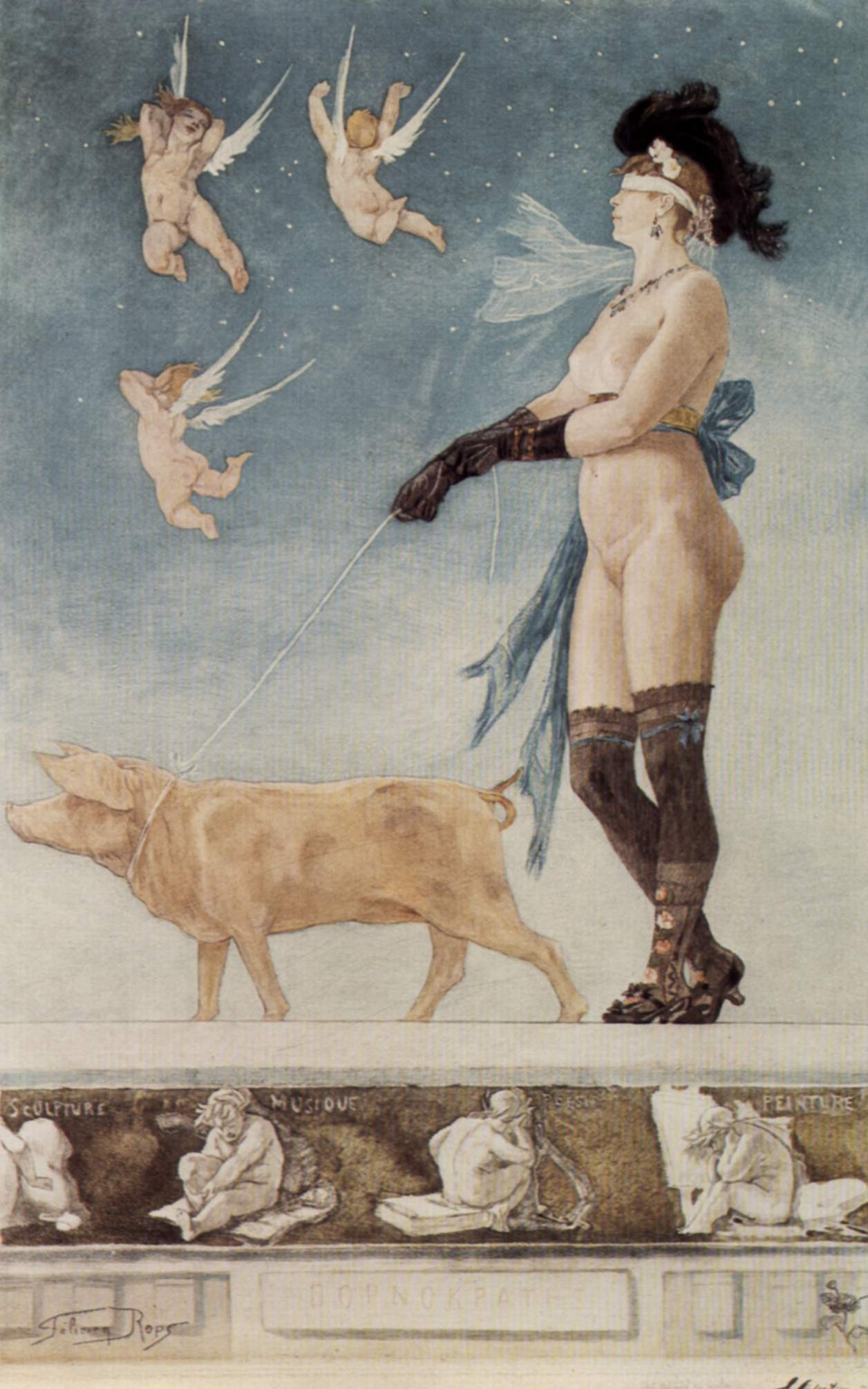
Pornocrates by Félicien Rops. Etching and aquatint

A piece of matte board, a plastic "card", or a wad of cloth is often used to push the ink into the incised lines. The surface is wiped clean with a piece of stiff fabric known as tarlatan and then wiped with newsprint paper; some printmakers prefer to use the blade part of their hand or palm at the base of their thumb. The wiping leaves ink in the incisions. You may also use a folded piece of organza silk to do the final wipe. If copper or zinc plates are used, then the plate surface is left very clean and therefore white in the print. If steel plate is used, then the plate's natural tooth gives the print a grey background similar to the effects of aquatinting. As a result, steel plates do not need aquatinting as gradual exposure of the plate via successive dips into acid will produce the same result.

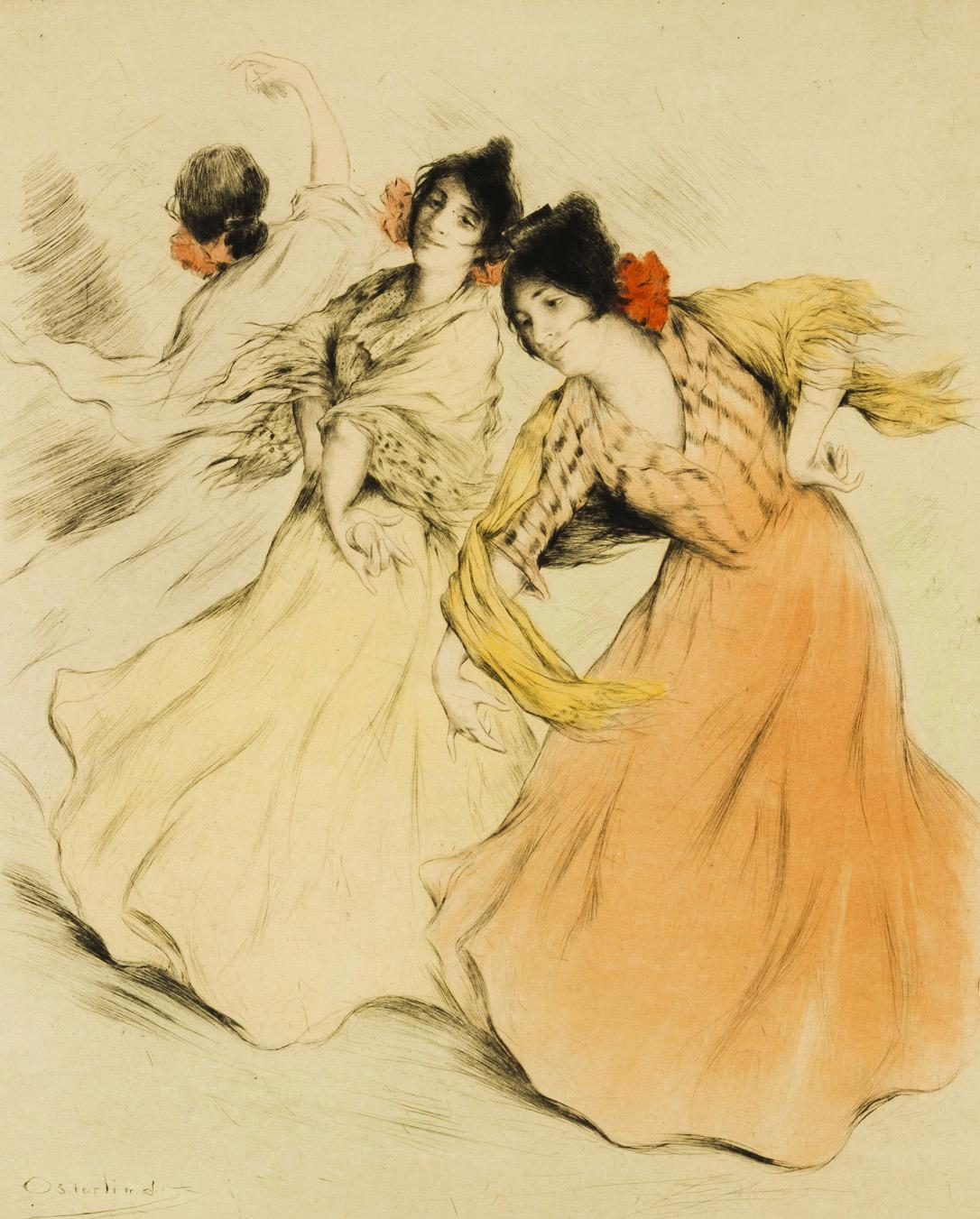
Colored etching and aquatint on paper

A damp piece of paper is placed over the plate and it is run through the press.

=== Nontoxic etching ===
Growing concerns about the health effects of acids and solvents led to the development of less toxic etching methods in the late 20th century. An early innovation was the use of floor wax as a hard ground for coating the plate. Others, such as printmakers Mark Zaffron and Keith Howard, developed systems using acrylic polymers as a ground and ferric chloride for etching. The polymers are removed with sodium carbonate (washing soda) solution, rather than solvents. When used for etching, ferric chloride does not produce a corrosive gas, as acids do, thus eliminating another danger of traditional etching.

The traditional aquatint, which uses either powdered rosin or enamel spray paint, is replaced with an airbrush application of the acrylic polymer hard ground. Again, no solvents are needed beyond the soda ash solution, though a ventilation hood is needed due to acrylic particulates from the air brush spray.

The traditional soft ground, requiring solvents for removal from the plate, is replaced with water-based relief printing ink. The ink receives impressions like traditional soft ground, resists the ferric chloride etchant, yet can be cleaned up with warm water and either soda ash solution or ammonia.

Anodic etching has been used in industrial processes for over a century. The etching power is a source of direct current. The item to be etched (anode) is connected to its positive pole. A receiver plate (cathode) is connected to its negative pole. Both, spaced slightly apart, are immersed in a suitable aqueous solution of a suitable electrolyte. The current pushes the metal out from the anode into solution and deposits it as metal on the cathode. Shortly before 1990, two groups working independently developed different ways of applying it to creating intaglio printing plates.

In the patented Electroetch system, invented by Marion and Omri Behr, in contrast to certain nontoxic etching methods, an etched plate can be reworked as often as the artist desires The system uses voltages below 2 volts which exposes the uneven metal crystals in the etched areas resulting in superior ink retention and printed image appearance of quality equivalent to traditional acid methods. With polarity reversed the low voltage provides a simpler method of making mezzotint plates as well as the "steel facing" copper plates.

Some of the earliest printmaking workshops experimenting with, developing and promoting nontoxic techniques include Grafisk Eksperimentarium, in Copenhagen, Denmark, Edinburgh Printmakers, in Scotland, and New Grounds Print Workshop, in Albuquerque, New Mexico.

=== Photo-etching ===
Light sensitive polymer plates allow for photorealistic etchings. A photo-sensitive coating is applied to the plate by either the plate supplier or the artist. Light is projected onto the plate as a negative image to expose it. Photopolymer plates are either washed in hot water or under other chemicals according to the plate manufacturers' instructions. Areas of the photo-etch image may be stopped-out before etching to exclude them from the final image on the plate, or removed or lightened by scraping and burnishing once the plate has been etched. Once the photo-etching process is complete, the plate can be worked further as a normal intaglio plate, using drypoint, further etching, engraving, etc. The final result is an intaglio plate which is printed like any other.

== Types of metal plates ==
Copper is a traditional metal, and is still preferred, for etching, as it bites evenly, holds texture well, and does not distort the color of the ink when wiped. Zinc is cheaper than copper, so preferable for beginners, but it does not bite as cleanly as copper does, and it alters some colors of ink. Steel is growing in popularity as an etching substrate. Increases in the prices of copper and zinc have steered steel to an acceptable alternative. The line quality of steel is less fine than copper, but finer than zinc. Steel has a natural and rich aquatint.

The type of metal used for the plate impacts the number of prints the plate will produce. The firm pressure of the printing press slowly rubs out the finer details of the image with every pass-through. With relatively soft copper, for example, the etching details will begin to wear very quickly, some copper plates show extreme wear after only ten prints. Steel, on the other hand, is incredibly durable. This wearing out of the image over time is one of the reasons etched prints created early in a numbered series tend to be valued more highly. An artist thus takes the total number of prints he or she wishes to produce into account whenever choosing the metal.

== Industrial uses ==
Etching is also used in the manufacturing of printed circuit boards and semiconductor devices, and in the preparation of metallic specimens for microscopic observation.

Prior to 1100 AD, the New World Hohokam culture independently utilized the technique of acid etching in marine shell designs. The shells were daubed in pitch and then bathed in acid probably made from fermented cactus juice.

=== Metallographic etching ===
Metallographic etching is a method of preparing samples of metal for analysis. It can be applied after polishing to further reveal microstructural features (such as grain size, distribution of phases, and inclusions), along with other aspects such as prior mechanical deformation or thermal treatments. Metal can be etched using chemicals, electrolysis, or heat (thermal etching).

== Controlling the acid's effects ==
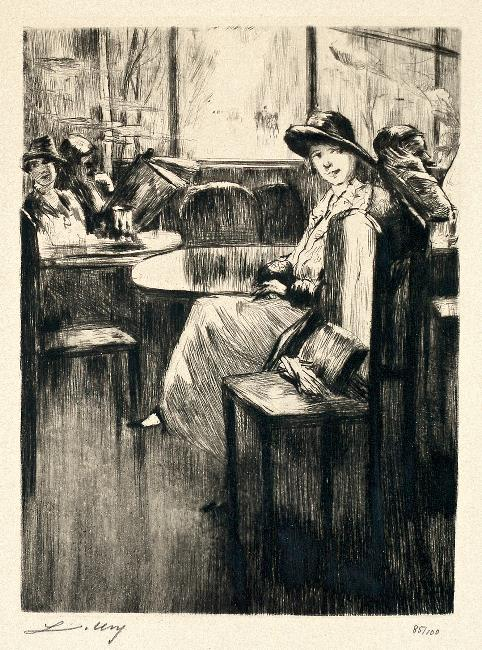
Young Girl in cafe with street-view, etching by Lesser Ury, 1924

There are many ways for the printmaker to control the acid's effects.

=== Hard grounds ===
Most typically, the surface of the plate is covered in a hard, waxy 'ground' that resists acid. The printmaker then scratches through the ground with a sharp point, exposing lines of metal which the mordant acid attacks.

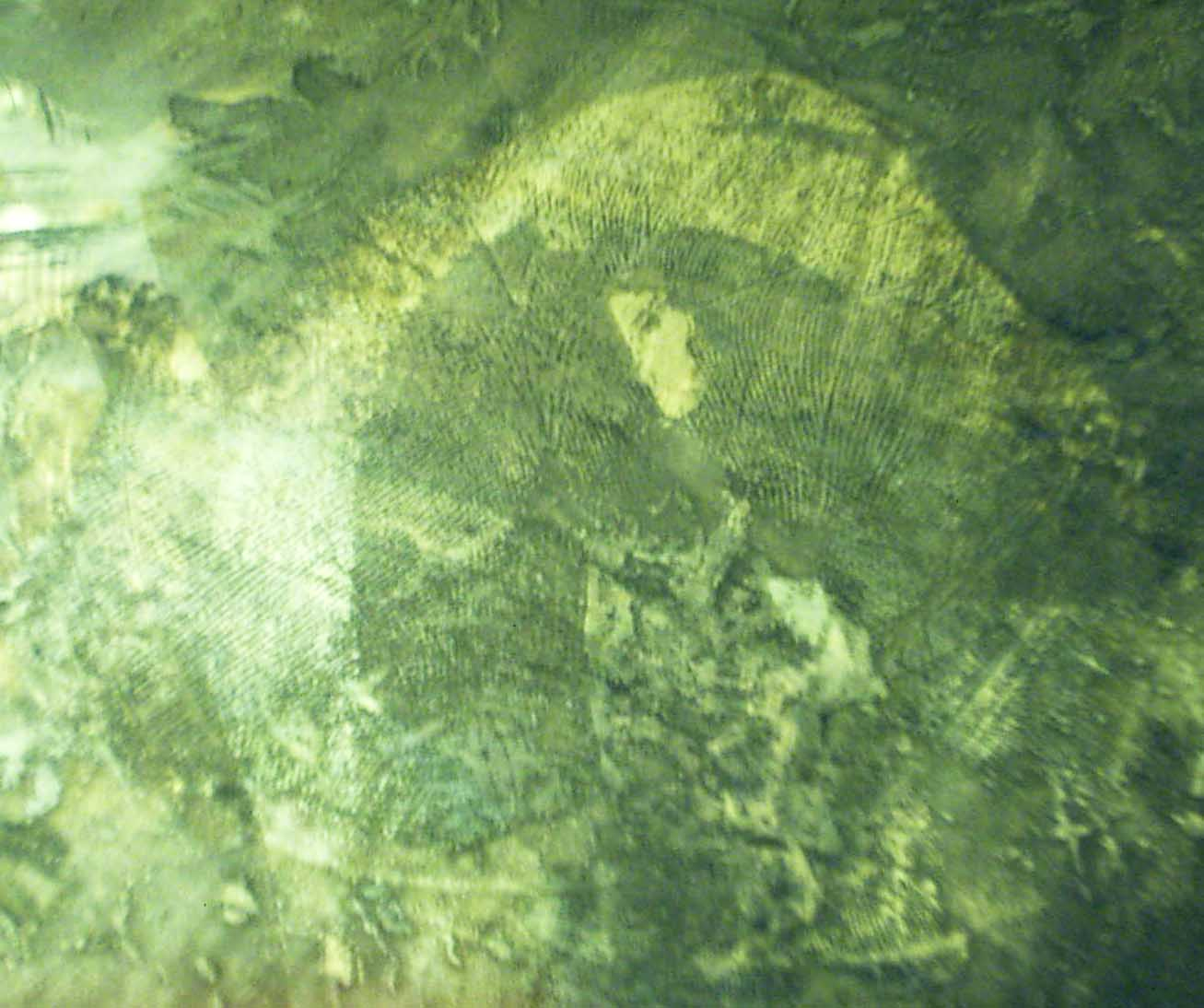
Example of sugar lift and spit bite effect

=== Aquatint ===
Aquatint is a variation giving only tone rather than lines when printed. Particulate resin is evenly distributed on all or parts of the plate, then heated to form a screen ground of uniform, but less than perfect, density. After etching, any exposed surface will result in a roughened (i.e., darkened) surface. Areas that are to be light in the final print are protected by varnishing between acid baths. Successive turns of varnishing and placing the plate in acid create areas of tone difficult or impossible to achieve by drawing through a wax ground.

=== Sugar lift ===
Designs in a syrupy solution of sugar or Camp Coffee are painted onto the metal surface prior to it being coated in a liquid etching ground or 'stop out' varnish. When the plate is placed in hot water the sugar dissolves, leaving the image. The plate can then be etched.

=== Spit bite ===
A mixture of nitric acid and gum arabic (or, very rarely, saliva) which can be dripped, spattered or painted onto a metal surface giving interesting results. A mixture of nitric acid and rosin may also be used.

== Printing ==
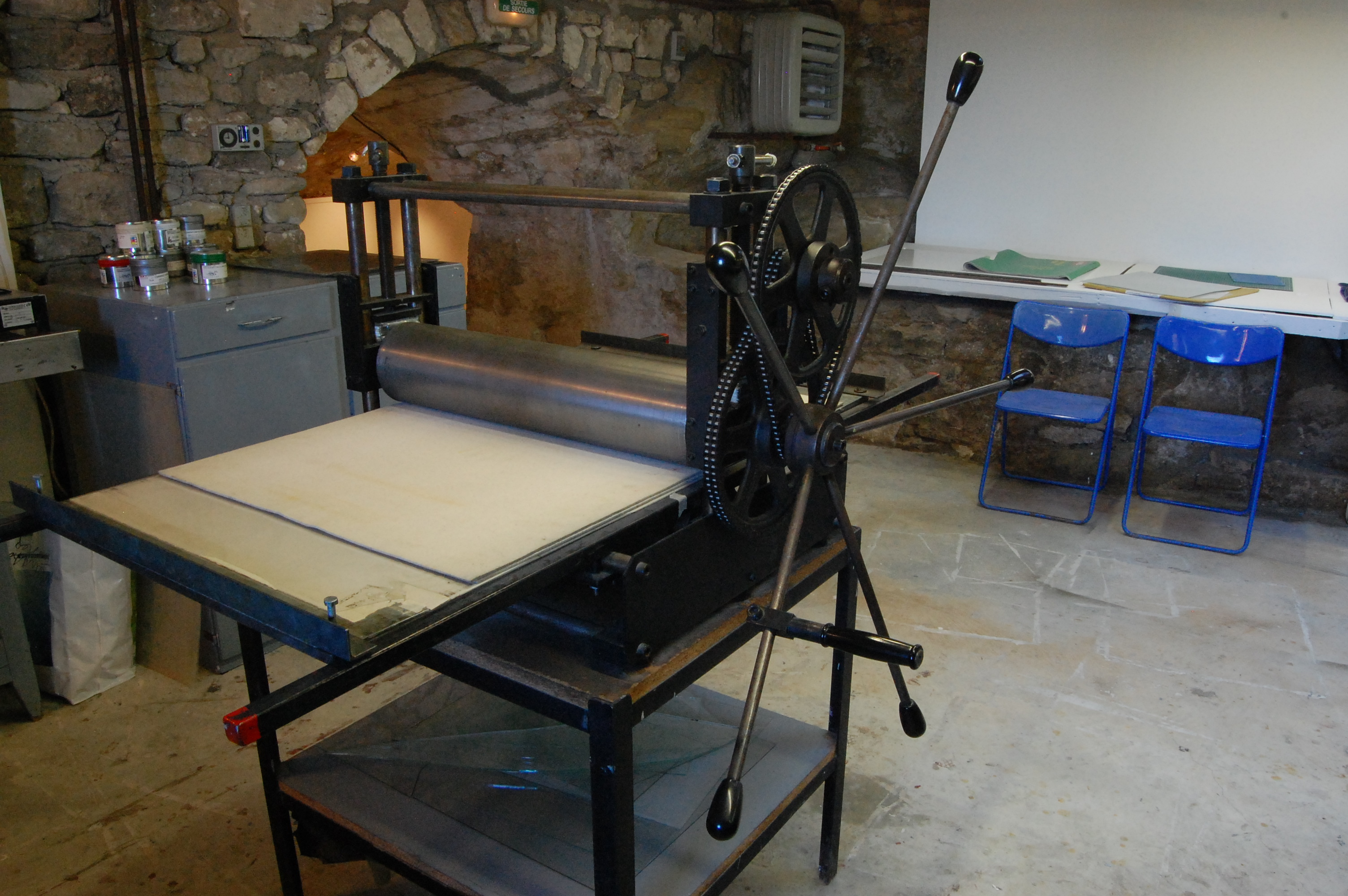
Cylinder press for printing etchings

Printing the plate is done by covering the surface with printing ink, then rubbing the ink off the surface with tarlatan cloth or newsprint, leaving ink in the roughened areas and lines. Damp paper is placed on the plate, and both are run through a printing press; the pressure forces the paper into contact with the ink, transferring the image (cf., chine-collé). The pressure subtly degrades the image in the plate, smoothing the roughened areas and closing the lines; a copper plate is good for, at most, a few hundred printings of a strongly etched imaged before the degradation is considered too great by the artist. At that point, the artist can manually restore the plate by re-etching it, essentially putting ground back on and retracing their lines; alternatively, plates can be electro-plated before printing with a harder metal to preserve the surface. Zinc is also used, because as a softer metal, etching times are shorter; however, that softness also leads to faster degradation of the image in the press.

== Faults ==
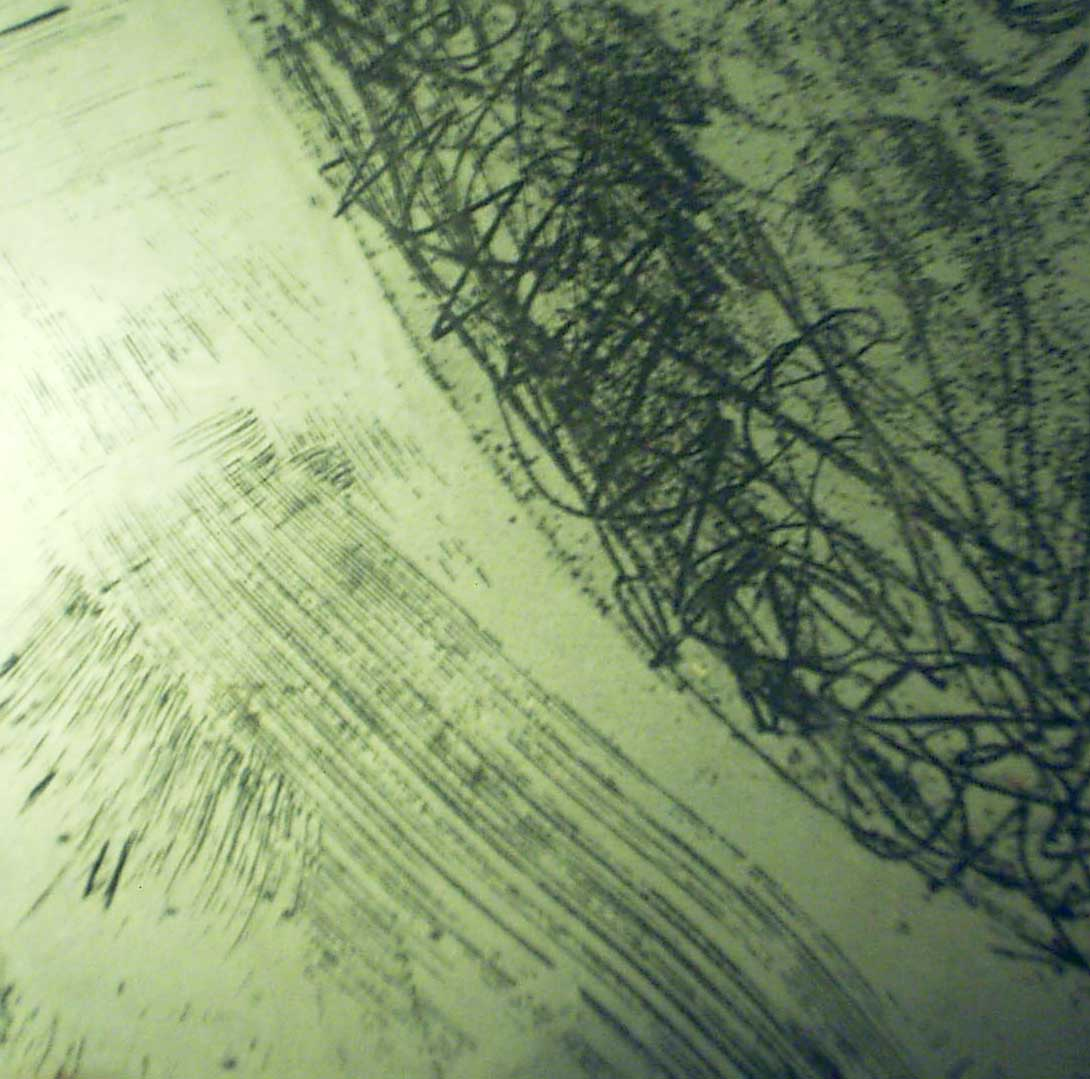
Example of foul bite in acid etching

Foul-bite or "over-biting" is common in etching, and is the effect of minuscule amounts of acid leaking through the ground to create minor pitting and burning on the surface. This incidental roughening may be removed by smoothing and polishing the surface, but artists often leave faux-bite, or deliberately court it by handling the plate roughly, because it is viewed as a desirable mark of the process.

== "Etchings" euphemism ==
The phrase "Want to come up and see my etchings?" is a romantic euphemism by which a person entices someone to come back to their place with an offer to look at something artistic, but with ulterior motives. The phrase is a corruption of some phrases in a novel by Horatio Alger Jr. called The Erie Train Boy, which was first published in 1891. Alger was an immensely popular author in the 19th century—especially with young people—and his books were widely quoted. In chapter XXII of the book, a woman writes to her boyfriend, "I have a new collection of etchings that I want to show you. Won't you name an evening when you will call, as I want to be certain to be at home when you really do come." The boyfriend then writes back "I shall no doubt find pleasure in examining the etchings which you hold out as an inducement to call."

This was referenced in a 1929 James Thurber cartoon in which a man tells a woman in a building lobby: "You wait here and I'll bring the etchings down". It was also referenced in Dashiell Hammett's 1934 novel The Thin Man, in which the narrator answers his wife asking him about a lady he had wandered off with by saying: "She just wanted to show me some French etchings."

The phrase was given new popularity in 1937: in a well publicized case, violinist David Rubinoff was accused of inviting a young woman to his hotel room to view some French etchings, but instead seducing her.

As early as 1895, Hjalmar Söderberg used the reference in his "decadent" début novel Delusions (swe: Förvillelser), when he lets the dandy Johannes Hall lure the main character's younger sister Greta into his room under the pretence that they browse through his etchings and engravings (e.g., Die Sünde by Franz Stuck).

== See also ==
- Acid test (gold)
- Electroetching
- List of art techniques
- List of etchings by Rembrandt
- List of printmakers
- Old master prints for the history of the method
- Photoengraving
- Photolithography
