= Uri =

Uri may refer to:

== Places ==
- Canton of Uri, a canton in Switzerland
- Úri, a village and commune in Hungary
- Uri, Iran, a village in East Azerbaijan Province
- Uri, Jammu and Kashmir, a town in India
- Uri (island), off Malakula Island in Vanuatu, South Pacific
- Uri, Sardinia, a commune in Italy
- Uri, Darfur, capital of the Tunjur kingdom

== People ==
- Uri (name), a given name
- Uri (Bible), two people in the Bible
- Aviva Uri (1922–1989), Israeli painter
- Eelco Uri (born 1973), Dutch water polo player
- Helene Uri (born 1964), Norwegian writer
- Jaan Uri (1875–1942), Estonian politician
- Joannes Uri (1724–1796), Hungarian orientalist
- Vanessa Uri (1981–2004), Filipina actress known as Halina Perez
- Ya'akov Uri (1888–1970), Israeli politician

== Other ==
- Winter Storm Uri, US, February 2021
- Uri: The Surgical Strike, a 2019 Indian film
- Uri Party, South Korea
- Uri language, spoken in Papua New Guinea
- uri, ISO 639-3 code for the Urim language of Papua New Guinea
- URI Purposely Built Vehicles, South Africa
- Uri, a dog in the book Call It Courage
- ʻūrī or Tahitian Dog
- URI, a Uniform Resource Identifier

== See also ==
- URI (disambiguation)
- Urey (disambiguation)
- Urie (disambiguation)
- Ury (disambiguation)
