= URI (disambiguation) =

URI may refer to:

- Ultrasound research interface, software
- Uniform Resource Identifier, identification of a web technology resource
- United Religions Initiative
- URI, the NYSE symbol of United Rentals
- Unione radiofonica italiana (URI), Italian broadcaster
- University of Rhode Island, a public university in the United States
- Upper respiratory infection

== See also ==
- Uri (disambiguation)
