= Urey =

Urey may refer to:

== People ==
- Benoni Urey (born 1957), Americo-Liberian businessman and politician
- Clemenceau Urey, Liberian businessman
- Daniel Salamanca Urey (1869–1935), president of Bolivia
- Harold Urey (1893-1981), American physical chemist
- Urey Fedorovich Lisianski (1773–1837), explorer and officer in the Imperial Russian Navy
- Urey Woodson (1859–1939), American politician, and newspaper editor and publisher

== Other uses ==
- 4716 Urey, a minor planet
- Urey (crater), a lunar impact crater
- Urey instrument (or Urey: Mars Organic and Oxidant Detector), a developmental spacecraft instrument for detecting organic compounds
- Urey Medal, given annually by the European Association of Geochemistry

== See also ==
- Uri (disambiguation)
- Urie (disambiguation)
- Ury (disambiguation)
