= Urie =

Urie may refer to:

- River Urie, Scotland
- Urie (name), including a list of people with the name
- Urie, Wyoming, United States
- Urie Lingey, Shetland Islands

== See also ==
- Uri (disambiguation)
- Ury (disambiguation)
- Urey (disambiguation)
