= Ground (etching) =

A ground is waxy material applied to the surface of a metal etching plate. A metal etching plate is a piece of sheet metal, usually copper, zinc, steel, or aluminium. The ground resists the acid or mordant which is used for etching, protecting areas of the metal plate. Grounds are made from a variety of materials including tar, asphaltum, paint (including spray paint), oil pastels, and other materials manufactured specifically for etching.

Most commonly, a ground is applied evenly over the surface of the metal sheet (also known as the etching plate), and then removed using scratching and other mark making techniques to reveal bare metal underneath. In the traditional technique this is done with a metal needle. However, different grounds enable the artist to create different types of marks. Some types of grounds, such as an aquatint ground, are more complex and may not include a removal process because they are applied in a selective manner.

The areas of the metal plate that are exposed will be etched by acid or mordant, while the ground resists the acid. The etched areas will have indentations, grooves, or cavities, while the areas that had a ground on them will typically remain the same as before the etching process.
