= Peter Ury =

German emigre composer active in the UK

Peter Ury (3 November 1920 – 20 September 1976) was a Jewish composer, playwright and journalist. Born in Ulm, where he played the organ in the synagogue, he escaped from Nazi persecution in 1939 by emigrating to England. He translated for the British Army, worked at the Deutscher Kulturbund until 1946, taught music at Trinity College London, and was music assistant to the theatre school at the Old Vic. He composed songs and some instrumental music, and for musical theatre and the ballet. Timothy, a children's opera with a libretto by the theatre director Peter Zadek, is based on the story 'Heinzelmeier' by Theodor Storm. Another collaboration with Zadek was Der Judaskuss (The Kiss of Judas), a miracle play with music. Ury also worked with the dancers Lotte and Ernest Berk, providing music for ballet productions, including The Family Suite.

Ury was the London correspondent for the regional West Deutsche Rundfunk radio station in Cologne for many years. In 1950 he married Sylvia Unger (1926–1998), another Nazi refugee and the daughter of the German playwright Alfred H. Unger. In the 1970s they were living at 16 Daleham Gardens, London NW3. There were three children, including the activist, author and artist Tanya Ury.

The Piano Sonata, Lullaby for Tanya and some of the songs have been published by NovaScribe Editions in Canada. Ury's personal papers are held at the Wiener Holocaust Library.

== Selected compositions ==
- The Brothers, music for Peter Zadek's production of the play by Philippa Burrell (Watergate Theatre, 1951)
- The Enchanted Apple, ballet (1951)
- The Family Suite, ballet (1949)
- Four Elderberry Songs
- Judas Passion
- Kinderlieder (Children's Songs), 23 songs with piano accompaniment
- The Kiss of Judas, miracle play with music (published 1976)
- Lullaby for Tanya for piano
- Piano Sonata in three movements
- Serenade for Strings
- Singspiel Der Judaskuss
- Symphony No. 1 (incomplete)
- Three Songs for Shoshanah
- Timothy, children's opera (libretto Peter Zadek)
