= Uri, Iran =

Uri اوري
- Village
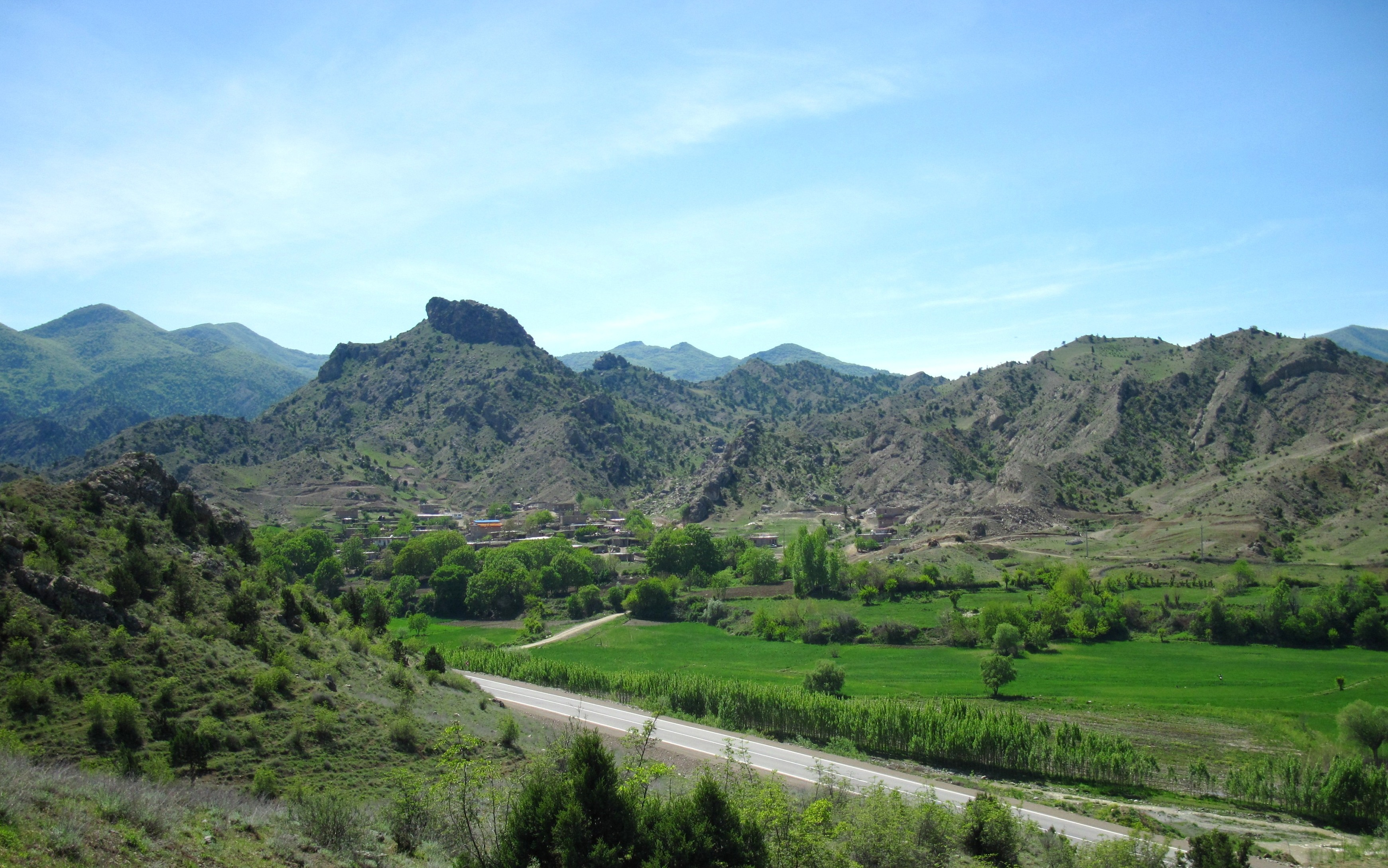
- A view of the village (2013)

- Location within Iran
- Coordinates: 39°00′43″N 46°56′28″E
- Country: Iran
- Province: East Azerbaijan
- County: Khoda Afarin
- Bakhsh: Minjavan
- Rural District: Minjavan-e Sharqi

Population (2006)
  - Total: 121
- Time zone: UTC+3:30 (IRST)
  - Summer (DST): UTC+4:30 (IRDT)

Uri (Persian: اوري, also Romanized as Ūrī) is a village in Minjavan-e Sharqi Rural District, Minjavan District, Khoda Afarin County, East Azerbaijan Province, Iran. At the 2006 census, its population was 121, in 27 families.
