= New Grounds Print Workshop =

American printing facility

Coordinates: 35°4′45.3″N 106°36′5.8″W

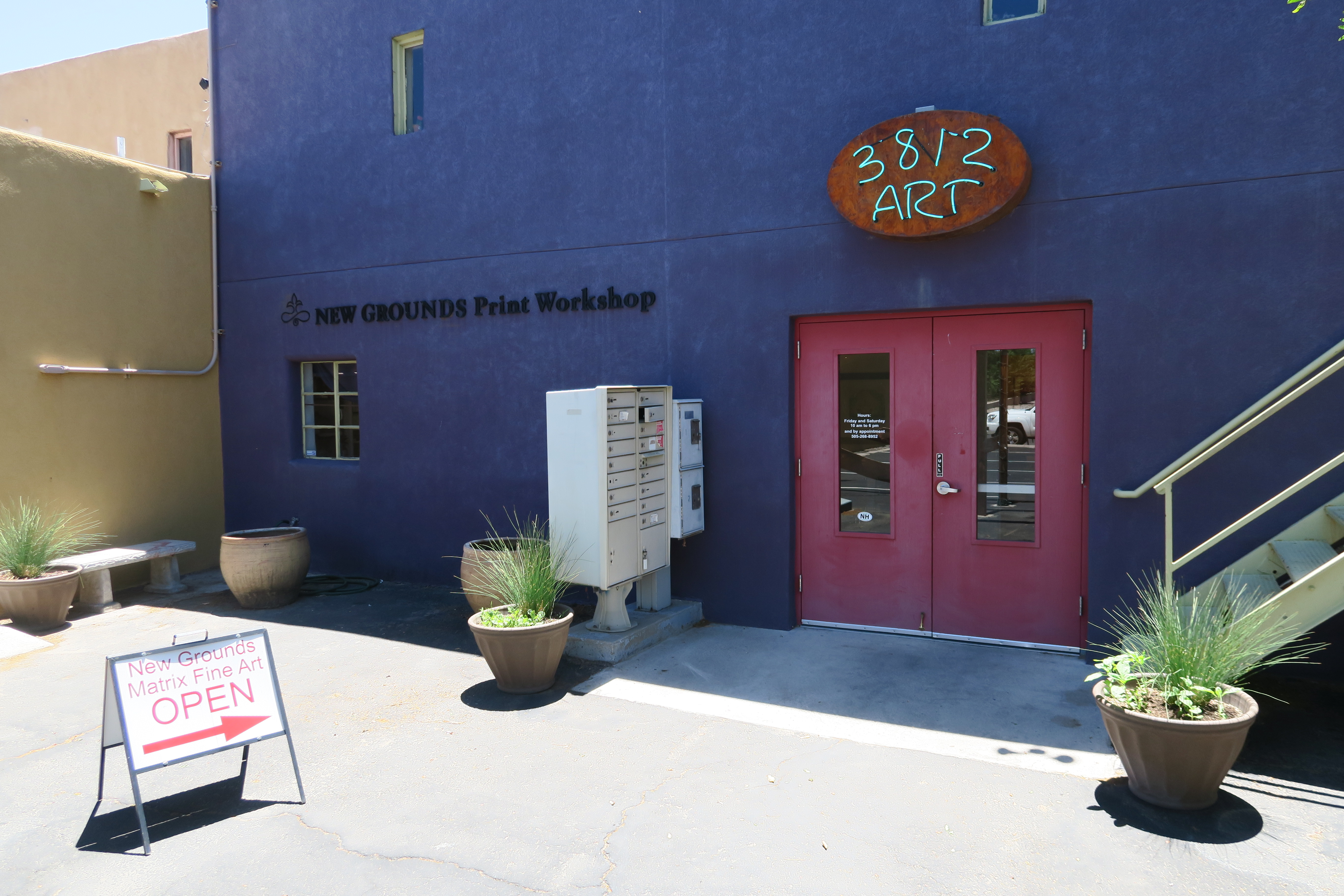
New Grounds Print Workshop

New Grounds Print Workshop, founded in 1996 by Regina Held, is a nontoxic printmaking facility specializing in intaglio and relief printmaking. It is located in Albuquerque, New Mexico, United States. According to the mission statement on their blog, New Grounds is "dedicated to providing artists with a professional, informative, safer and well-equipped environment for the creation of fine prints while promoting the artists and exhibiting their work."

== Origins and goals ==
New Grounds was founded in response to three particular needs:

1. The need for a printmaking center in Albuquerque offering classes, press and studio access to all artists working in intaglio and relief printmaking.
2. The need to educate the general public about printmaking by offering studio tours, lectures and exhibitions.
3. The need for this facility to be nontoxic. At that time all printmaking constituted a high health risk to artists in addition to having a negative impact on the environment.

New Grounds utilized the research of the innovators Keith Howard and Mark Zaffron to build a completely green studio, and, according to a research paper written by Liz Chalfin from Zea Mays Printmaking studio, New Grounds was one of the first nontoxic printmaking studios in the United States.

It all began with a non-toxic studio in her remodeled South Valley garage, where artists would rent press access on an hourly basis and Held taught classes. At that time, New Grounds also offered papermaking classes and access to the papermaking studio. In 2000, Regina expanded to the current 3500 square foot commercial space in Nob Hill. Now, more than five years later, New Grounds includes a thriving gallery that represents member and international artists whose works Regina consigns. It is also a shared workspace where resident artists have the use of two large print rooms, five presses, comfortable work and storage areas, a break room, and areas in which to shoot photographic plates for gravures and to etch plates for intaglio prints. Another entire room, with its own press, is devoted to classes, where everything from monotype to the alternative process, gumoil printing, is taught.

== Impact ==
New Grounds Print Workshop has had a significant influence on the promotion of nontoxic printmaking. Other workshops have modeled their facilities after New Grounds and printmakers from school teachers to university professors from around the world have studied nontoxic printmaking there.
