= List of reporting marks: U =

Note: Marks ending in U are for container owners; marks ending in X are not common carriers; marks ending in Z are for trailers without flanged wheels. All other marks are of common-carrier railroads.

== U ==
- UBTX - Union Camp Corporation
- UCCX - Union Carbide Canada, Ltd.
- UCEX - Union Electric Company
- UCFX - Union Carbide Corporation
- UCLX - Vulcan Minerals Company
- UCOX - Union Carbide Corporation
- UCPX - Essem Corporation
- UCR - Utah Coal Route
- UCRY - Utah Central Railway
- UELX - United Equipment Leasing Associates; Archer Daniels Midland
- UECZ - Union Elevator Co.
- UEEZ - Union Equity Elevator Co.
- UEFZ - Union Equity
- UFIX - Utility Fuels, Inc.
- UIWX - Riley Stoker Corporation
- UMP - Upper Merion and Plymouth Railroad
- UMPX - Upper Merion and Plymouth Leasing Company
- UNI - Unity Railways
- UNCX - Union Carbide Canada, Ltd.
- UNPX - Procor
- UNSX - Unitrain Services
- UO - Union Railroad (Oregon)
- UOCX - General American Transportation Corporation
- UP - Union Pacific Railroad
- UPAX - United Power Association
- UPB - Union Pacific Railroad
- UPFE - Pacific Fruit Express; Union Pacific Railroad
- UPM - Union Pacific Railroad (Milwaukee Road directed operations)
- UPOZ - United Parcel Service
- UPP - Union Pacific Railroad (passenger cars)
- UPRQ - Union Pacific Railroad End Of Train Devices
- UPRX - Union Pacific Fruit Express Company
- UPS - Union Pacific Railroad (slugs)
- UPSZ - United Parcel Service
- UPT - Union Pacific Railroad (fuel tenders)
- UPWZ - United Parcel Service
- UPX - Union Pearson Express
- UPY - Union Pacific Railroad (yard switchers)
- URDX - United States Steel
- URR - Union Railroad (Pittsburgh, Pennsylvania)
- URTX - Union Refrigerator Transit Line; General American Transportation Corporation
- URY - Union Railway of Memphis
- USAX - United States Army
- USBX - GE Rail Services
- USCX - William G. Simon
- USEX - Evans Railcar Leasing Company
- USFU - United States Air Force
- USGX - Union Sugar Company
- USIX - US Industrial Chemicals Company
- USLF - Burlington Northern Railroad
- USLX - Evans Railcar Leasing Company; GE Capital Railcar Services
- USNX - United States Navy
- USPX - US Plastics Corporation
- USRX - U.S. Railways, Inc.
- USSX - United States Steel
- USWX - USA Waste Services
- UTAH - Utah Railway
- UTAX - Utah Transit Authority (formerly assigned to United Transportation, Inc.)
- UTBX - Union Tank Car Company
- UTCX - Union Tank Car Company
- UTLX - Union Tank Car Company
- UTPX - Union Texas Petroleum Corporation
- UTR - Union Transportation
- UTTX - Trailer Train Company
