= Tanya Ury =

German writer and artist

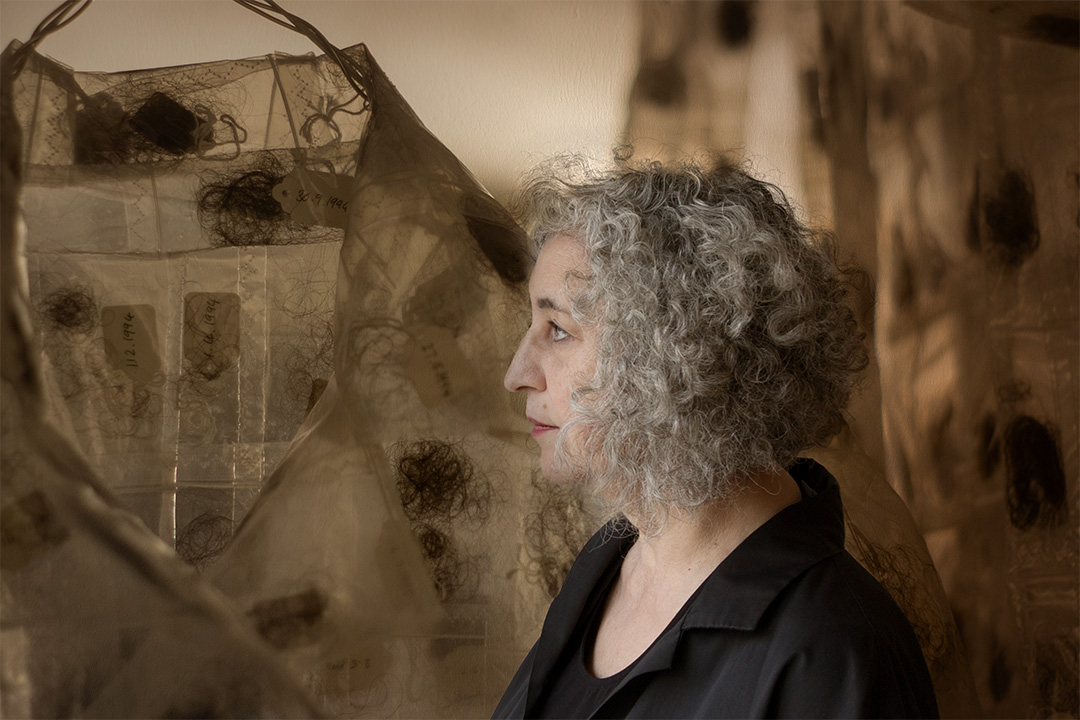
- Tanya Ury with her installation, "Hair Shirt Army" Alexander Gerbeth, 2014
- Born: Suzanne Miriam Tanya Ury; October 1951 (age 74–75); Marylebone, London, England
- Education: Exeter College of Art and Design; University of Cologne; University of Reading
- Occupations: visual artist writer activist
- Parent(s): Peter Ury (1920-1976); Sylvia Unger (1926-1998)

Tanya Ury (born October 1951, London) is an activist, author and artist. Since 1993 she has lived in Cologne, which is where many of her family members, including well-known German-Jewish authors, came from. Her arresting video, photographic and performance output deal with Jewish history in general, frequently with a more specific focus on her own Jewish familial provenance. Other themes cover such controversial matters as the Shoah, Racism, Sexuality and Pornography.

== Life ==
=== Provenance ===
Tanya Ury was born towards the end of 1951 into a family of Jewish intellectuals in the Marylebone quarter of London, and grew up in the nearby Belsize Park area. She was the eldest of three siblings, another daughter and a son. Her father, Peter Ury, was a journalist and composer originally from Ulm. Her mother, born (Karin) Sylvia Unger, was a daughter of Alfred H. Unger and niece to Wilhelm Unger.

Her maternal grandfather, Alfred H. Unger was a German author and dramatist and also, at one stage, chief dramaturge at Universum Film AG (today: "UFA GmbH") in Berlin. In 1936/37 he and her grandmother, Nina, were forced to flee to London where the family lived in exile. This was on account of their Jewish origins. Other family members, including two great aunts, were deported by the authorities during the Nazi years and murdered. Her paternal grandfather, Dr. Sigmar Ury, was prevented from receiving treatment for kidney cancer in the city hospital in Ulm because he was Jewish. He died at home in 1941, cared for by her grandmother, Hedwig, who was herself murdered at Auschwitz in 1944.

=== Early years ===
After leaving school she took a succession of jobs, working at various stages as a cook, a herb gardener and as a professional carer. It was only in 1985 that she enrolled art the Exeter College of Art and Design (as it was known at the time) near Plymouth. She emerged three years later with a first degree (BA Hons, 1st class) in fine arts. She moved on to the University of Reading where her course included a term at the University of Cologne, studying media arts, during 1989. In 1990 she was awarded a master's degree in Fine Arts. During 1991/92 she was employed as a guest lecturer at the Sheffield Hallam University, for which she was supported with a stipendium from the Colin Walker Fellowship.

=== Middle years ===
In 1999, with her younger siblings Ninette "Nini" and David, she deposited the family's substantial historical archive with the Cologne Municipal Archive. In 2009 the building housing the archive collapsed in connection with tunnel construction for the Cologne Stadtbahn ("light rail") network. This necessitated a major restoration of the documents, which by 2014 was estimated to have been approximately 75% successful: Ury spoke, in the context of this experience, of "a kind of second extermination experience", in a reference to the losses the family had already undergone two generations earlier in the Shoah.

After 2010 she was assigned for a number of years as a Doctoranda to the Faculty of Humanities in the Institute for Culture and the Arts at Leiden University. Between 2014 and 2017 she was also a jury member for the "Hans and Lea Grundig Prize" administered by the Hans and Lea Grundig Foundation (and administered more recently, on behalf of the Grundig Foundation, by the Rosa Luxemburg Foundation).

== Works ==
In her written and photographic output, and in her installations, performances and video-art, Tanya Ury explores Jewish-German identity, and the way German society deals with its history, along with the role of "subaltern" women in the contexts of migration and racism.

She has been collecting her hair fall daily in small plastic bags since 1992. By 2015 the collection had already beyond 7,000 bags, which are dated with handwritten labels, and which she uses for her art.

Ury is deeply conscious of her family's longstanding Cologne connections. Her 33-minute split-screen video "Kölnisch Wasser" ( ie "Eau de Cologne") appeared in 2003. It features extracts from seven live performances from between 1993 and 1997 along with a video recording from the tattoo studio "Performance 4711". (4711 is the brand name of Cologne's most iconic - at least for citizens of Cologne - Eau de Cologne.) One of her recurring themes is clearly on display: taking back some control of her family history. In 1993 she had the number "4711" tattooed on her upper thigh. This was done to commemorate her grandmother, Hedwig, and her great aunts, Ella and Grete, all three of whom were murdered in concentration camps.

Attacks on immigrants in London and Germany, such as the nail bomb attack in Düsseldorf against Russian Jewish immigrants, prompted her richly allusive 21 part photo-sequence "Jack the Ladder" in 2000. The title and the format are a conscious reference to the story of Jacob's Ladder in Genesis. However, the ladder collapses into what one commentator describes as "a labyrinth of global suffering". Prominent images are of a young Chinese girl wearing black tights and positioned on a red oriental carpet. Other images include a "laddered" stocking spattered with red nail varnish, nails, broken glass and knives.

In the 2004 performance-video "Röslein sprach…" ("Little Rose spoke") Tanya Ury used a thin needle and a fine black thread to sew the word "Boss" into the skin on the palm of her hand. In the background Janet Baker can be heard singing Schubert's song-setting of Goethe's "Heidenröslein" ("Little Meadow Rose "). Baker's rendering of the well-loved Schubert song was one that Ury had often heard as a child at home. The darker side of "Röslein sprach…" came with its dedication to all the forced labourers in occupied Europe during the first part of the 1940s who had been forced to work for Boss of Metzingen, sewing to produce the company's top selling National Socialist uniforms. (Hugo Boss and his business were widely perceived as prominent Nazi supporters during the 1920s, 30s and 40s.)

Tanya Ury was a prominent opponent of the 2005 "Flick Exhibition" in Berlin. The "Friedrich Christian Flick Collection" had been presented as a temporary memorial to the Flick business empire's contribution to the industry and commerce of the country, and to relaunch the Flick reputation in a "new and lasting direction", but for many observers, including Ury, the attempt backfired dramatically, serving only to recall the close involvement of the industrialist Friedrich Flick with the Nazi regime. Subsequently, Ury has resisted the tireless pressure to rehabilitate the Flick name.

Many of her works take as their themes the Holocaust, Prostitution and Voyeurism. That comes across in the ongoing series, "Who's Boss" (since 2002), in which these are combined with the theme of "forced labour". The picture series entitled "Art Prize" was part of the 2005 IFA exhibition "Stets gern für Sie beschäftigt…" ("Always glad to be of service..."). This art-work comprises four digital photo-collages, each made up of three elements. The first third from each of the four collages each shows a row of advertising postcards from the Hugo Boss AG fashion collection for 1998/99. One of the garments featured is a leather coat similar to those used by German Luftwaffe pilots during the war. The second third, in each of the four sets, shows Spanish postcards of lovers presented as dolls, dating from the Franco years. The final third consists of nude portraits of Tanya Ury herself, dating from 1996, each of them featuring an original Nazi-era Luftwaffe pilot's leather coat.

== Other activities ==
Tanya Ury is a longstanding member of the independent Jewish Human Rights Organization Jews for Justice for Palestinians, and also of the Jüdische Stimme für gerechten Frieden in Nahost e. V., the German section of the international Federation European Jews for a Just Peace (EJJP, ).

== See also ==
- Lesser Leo Ury (born Leiser Leo Ury: Great-great-uncle on father's side)

== Bibliography ==
- Brungs, Juliette. Written into the Body: Introducing the Performance Video Art of Tanya Ury [in: Nexus, Essays in German Jewish Studies, Vol.1: A Publication of Duke University Jewish Studies, pp 189–203]. Camden House, 2011. ISBN 1571135014
