= Lesser Ury =

German painter (1861–1931)

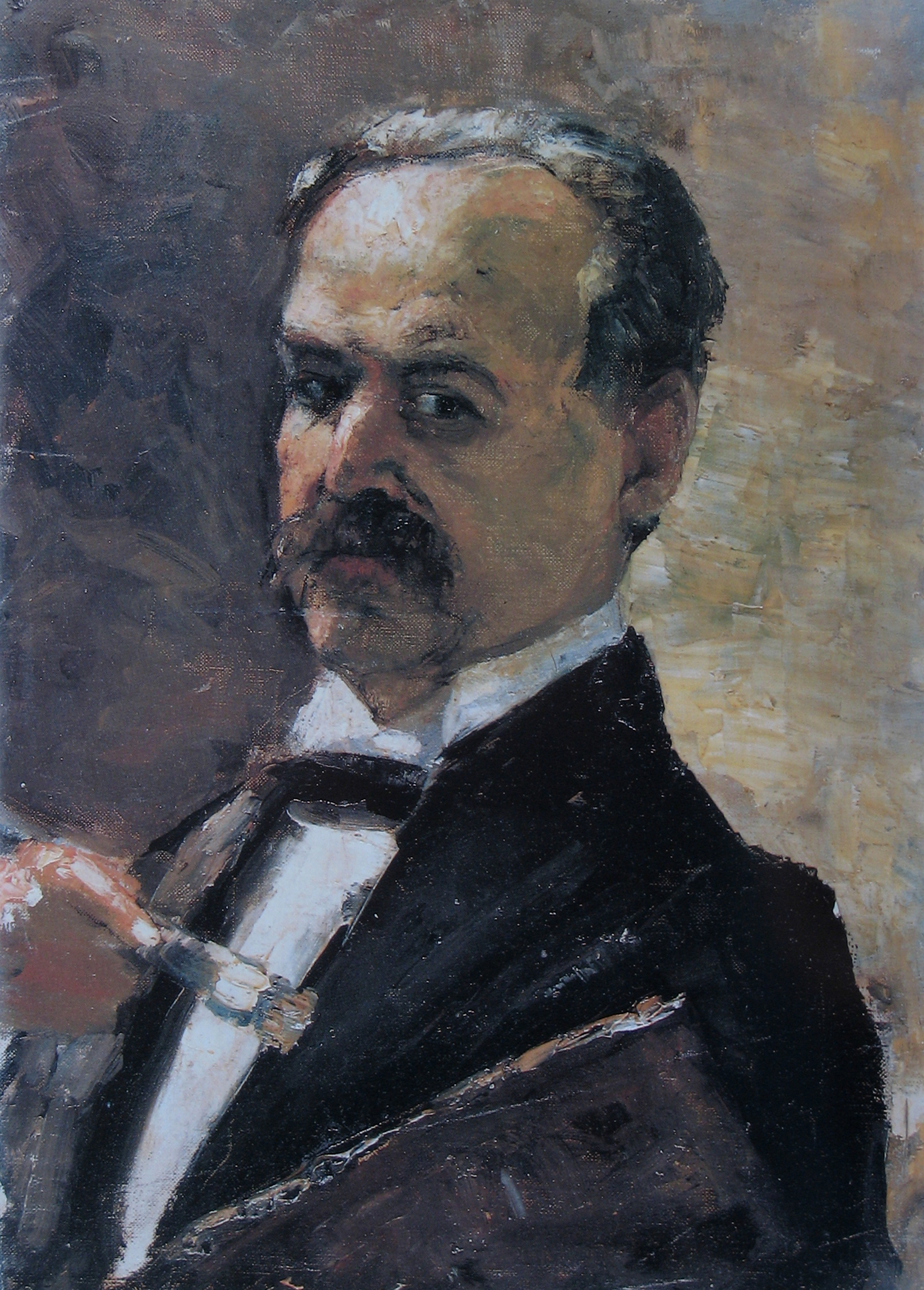
- Self-portrait (1910)
- Born: November 7, 1861; Birnbaum, Province of Posen, Kingdom of Prussia
- Died: October 18, 1931 (aged 69); Berlin, Weimar Republic

Leo Lesser Ury (November 7, 1861 – October 18, 1931) was a German impressionist painter and printmaker, associated with the Düsseldorf school of painting.

== Life and career ==
Ury was born on November 7, 1861, in Birnbaum in what was then the Kingdom of Prussia (now Międzychód in Poland). He was the son of a baker whose death in 1872 was followed by the family's relocation to Berlin. In 1878 Ury left school to apprentice with a tradesman, and the next year he went to Düsseldorf to study painting at the Kunstakademie. Ury spent time in Brussels, Paris, Munich, and other locations, before returning to Berlin in 1887.

His first exhibition was in 1889 and met with a hostile reception, although he was championed by Adolph Menzel whose influence induced the Akademie to award Ury a prize. In 1893, he joined the Munich Secession, one of the several Secessions formed by progressive artists in Germany and Austria in the last years of the 19th century. In 1901, he returned to Berlin, where he exhibited with the Berlin Secession, first in 1915 and notably in 1922, when he had a major exhibition. By this time Ury's critical reputation had grown and his paintings and pastels were in demand. His subjects were landscapes, urban landscapes, and interior scenes, treated in an impressionistic manner that ranged from the subdued tones of figures in a darkened interior to the effects of streetlights at night to the dazzling light of foliage against the summer sky. He also painted Biblical scenes, many of which have not survived.

Ury is especially noted for his paintings of nocturnal cafe scenes and rainy streets. He developed a habit of repeating these compositions in order to sell them while retaining the originals, and these quickly-made and inferior copies have harmed his reputation.

Always introverted and distrustful of people, Ury became increasingly reclusive in his later years. He died on October 18, 1931, in Berlin and is buried in the Jewish Cemetery in Berlin-Weissensee.

== Gallery ==
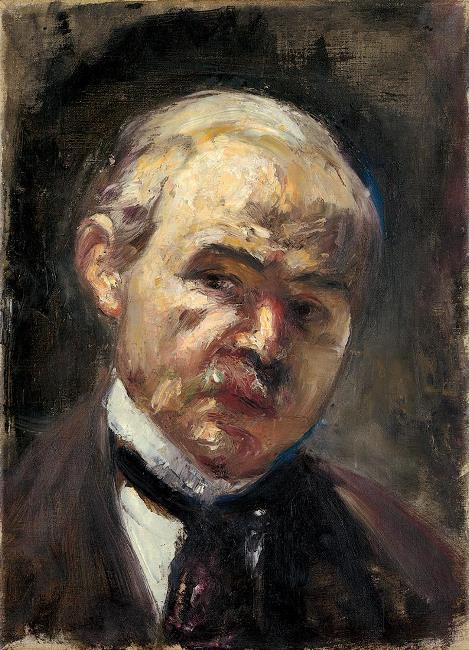
Self-portrait

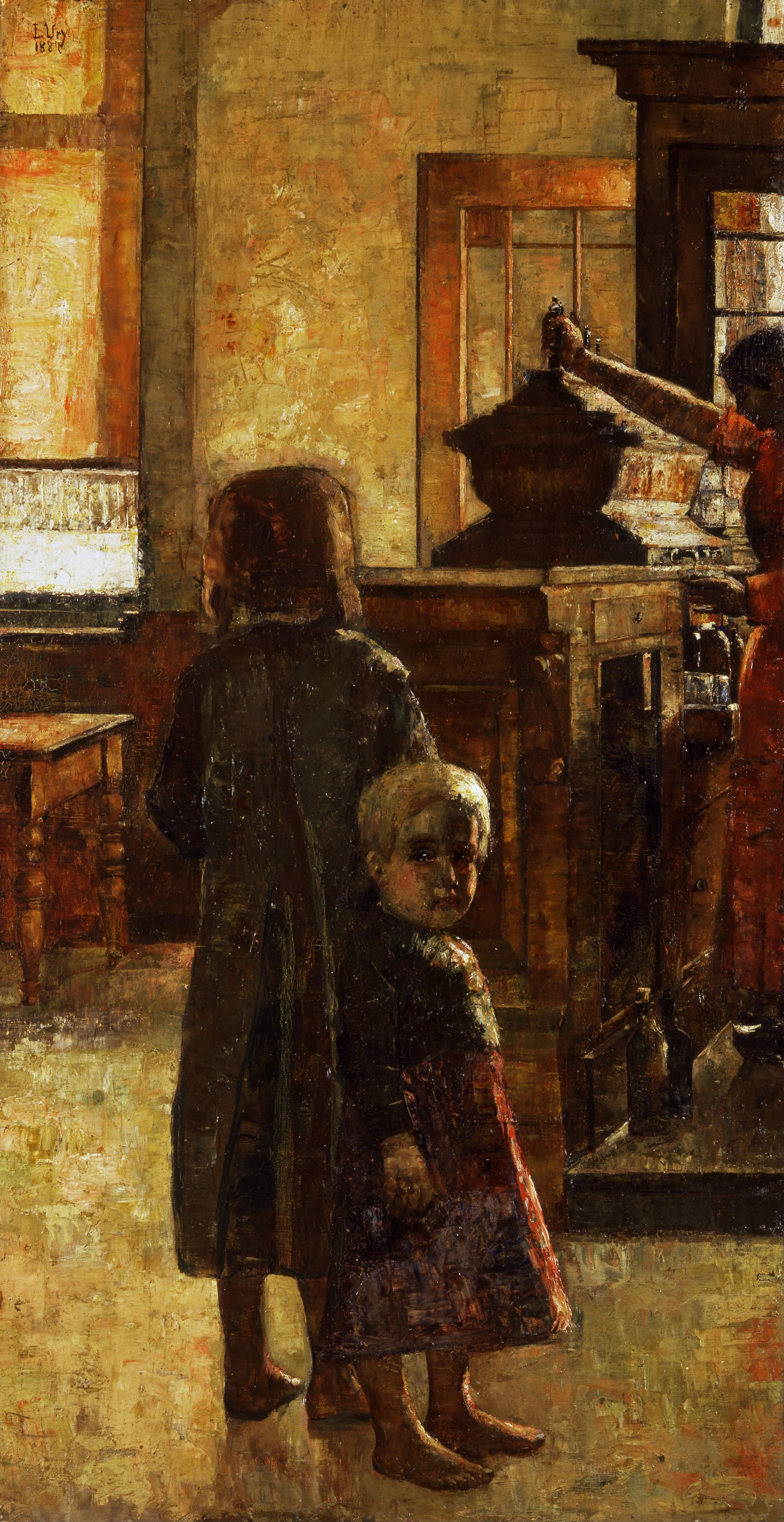
Flämische Schenke, (Estaminet, Flemish Tavern) 1884, Alte Nationalgalerie

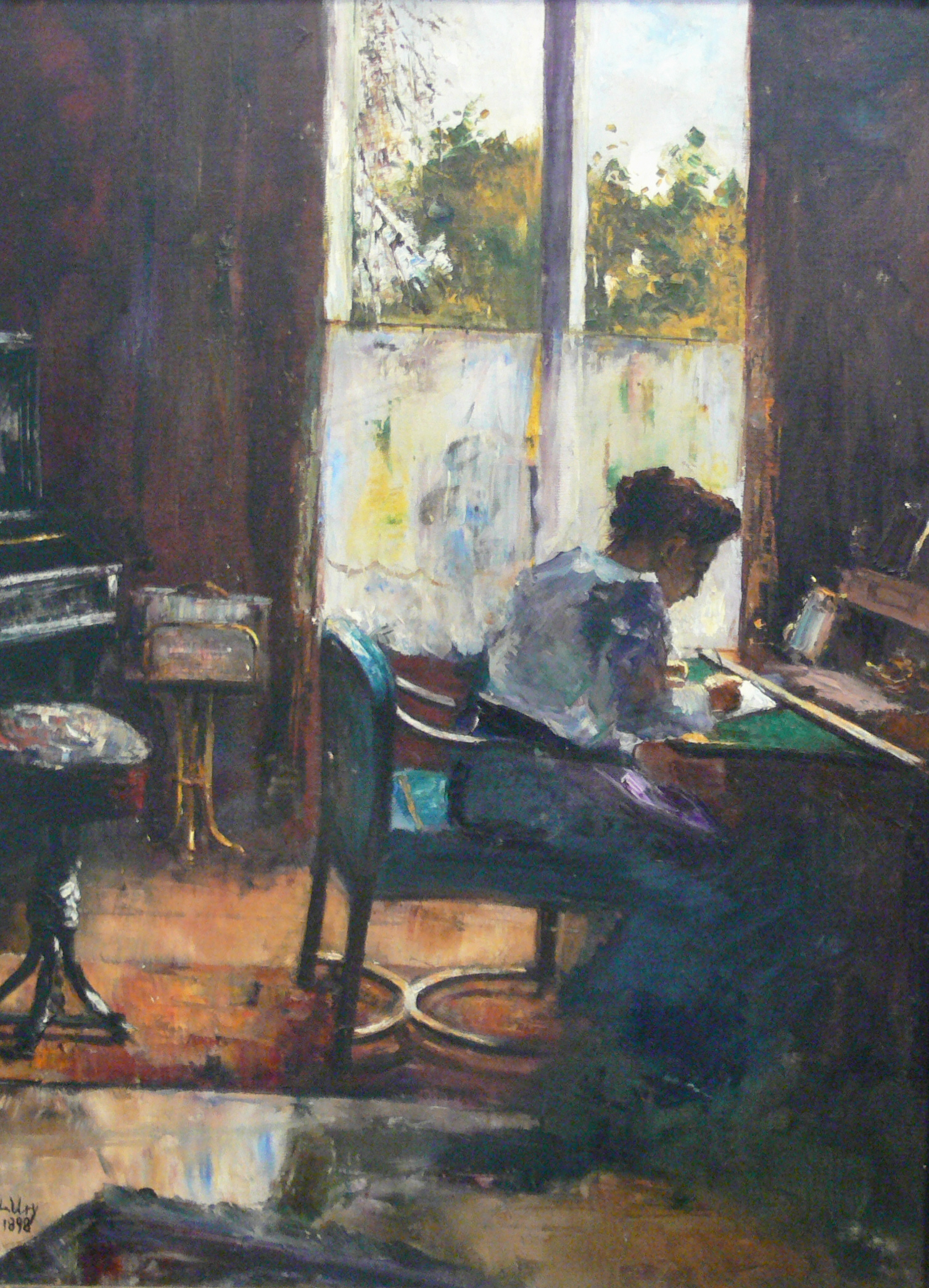
Frau am Schreibtisch (Woman at writing desk), 1898

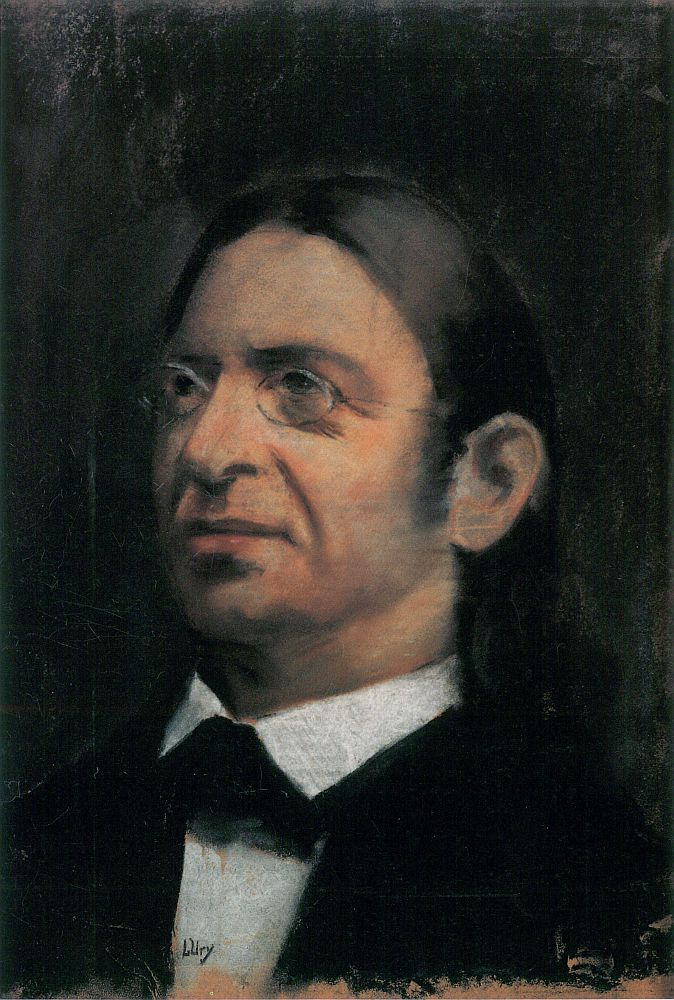
Abraham Geiger, ca. 1905

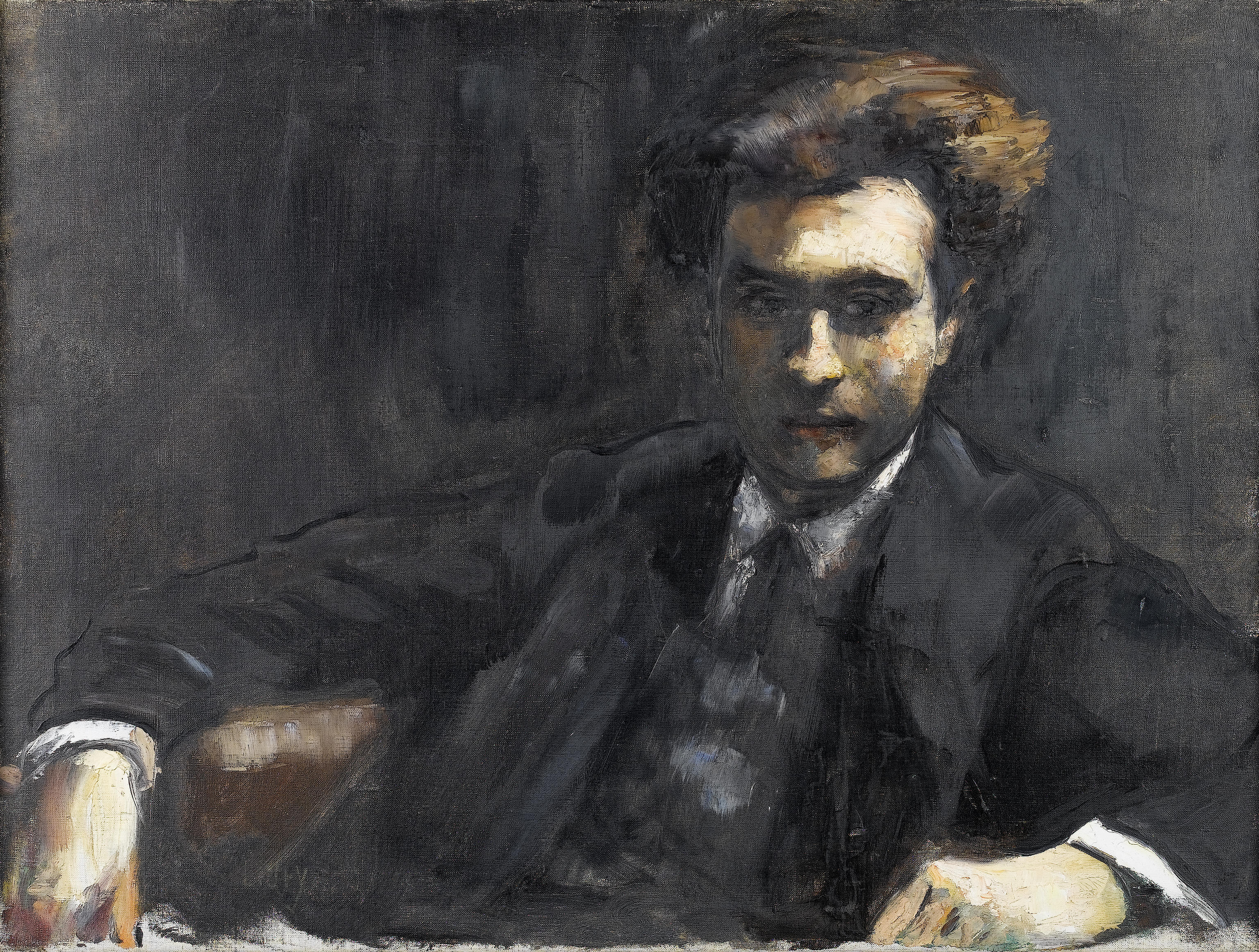
Portrait of Dr. Fritz Rathenau

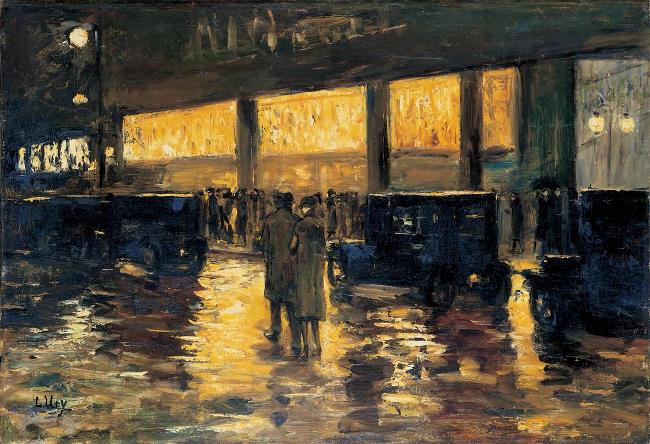
Vor dem Café (Berlin by Night), 1920s

== See also ==
- Tanya Ury
