= Instrumentalization of the Holocaust =

Invocation of the Holocaust for political gain

The instrumentalization of the Holocaust is the idea that memory of the Holocaust is manipulated for political, ideological, and financial gain. Accusations of instrumentalization have been made against the State of Israel and its supporters, the Russian government, nationalists and right-wing populists in Europe (particularly Hungarian and Polish nationalists), communist governments, and others.

The practice of instrumentalization was criticized by many Holocaust survivors, including Zygmunt Bauman, Primo Levi, and Jean Améry.

== Israeli–Palestinian conflict ==
Holocaust and genocide scholar Omer Bartov argues that the Holocaust is one of the primary justifications for the foundation and existence of Israel as a Jewish state. One study of speeches by political leaders concluded that, "The Holocaust plays a major role in the politics and national identity of Israel and Germany." Bartov also warns that Israel's repeated invocation of the Holocaust to justify its military actions against Palestinians represents a profound moral and historical distortion. Bartov argues that by portraying every threat to Israel as "another Auschwitz" and its enemies as Nazis, a rhetorical pattern dating back to Prime Minister Menachem Begin's comparison of Yasir Arafat to Hitler, Israeli leaders have transformed Holocaust memory from a universal warning against inhumanity into a "carte blanche for destroying others by invoking one's own past victimhood." He cautions that this instrumentalization of the Holocaust risks eroding its global moral authority and collapsing the very foundation of Holocaust commemoration, which was meant to uphold "the dignity of every human being" and to resist oppression in all its forms.

In his book Paradigm Lost, political scientist Ian Lustick says that many Zionist leaders, such as David Ben-Gurion and Chaim Weizmann, viewed the Holocaust as a "wasting asset" and sought to take advantage of sympathy for Jews to achieve Israeli independence. An example of this is their role in the Exodus incident, in which Zionists arranged for the illegal immigration of several hundred Holocaust survivors to Mandatory Palestine. After the ship was intercepted, Ben-Gurion intervened to prevent the refugees from being invited to a third country, and celebrated that the incident dominated international headlines. A few years later, Israeli leaders sought to use the Holocaust to obtain much-needed foreign investment from Germany. Jewish organizations such as AIPAC, StandWithUs, and the American Jewish Committee have connected the Holocaust to positive images of Israel in funding appeals and other publications. Segal writes that the field of Holocaust studies is based on the implicit proposition "that Israel, the state of Holocaust survivors, can never perpetrate genocide".

Numerous historians and academics have argued that Israel has used the Holocaust to justify its actions towards Palestinians. Historian Moshe Zuckermann, for example, argued that particularist interpretations of the lessons of the Holocaust served to "justify the occupation and brutal, oppressive Israeli acts". Although he criticized the equation of the Holocaust with Israeli policies, Michael Rothberg also denounced the abuse of the Holocaust to justify Israeli violence, writing that it was "the morally justified originary position of victim that frequently justifies violence". Historian Daniel Blatman faulted Israel's "taking advantage of the terrible destruction that the Holocaust brought upon the Jewish people", and the tendency to "wave the permanent victim card" in response to criticism of Israeli policies.

The charge of instrumentalization was prominently made by a number of books around the end of the twentieth century, particularly Peter Novick's The Holocaust in American Life, Tim Cole's Selling the Holocaust, and Norman Finkelstein's The Holocaust Industry, but these books were largely dismissed as overly cynical. In 2022, the conference "Hijacking Memory" was organized to "explore the hijacking of Holocaust memory by right-wing forces", and included presentations on a variety of countries including Germany, Poland, the United Kingdom, and Russia. The conference was split by controversy after Palestinian speaker Tareq Baconi argued that the memory of the Holocaust should not be used to argue against Palestinian human rights. Although Baconi's speech was applauded by the audience, Jan Grabowski and Konstanty Gebert accused him of antisemitism. More recently, Raz Segal and Enzo Traverso argue that the Holocaust has been used to justify what they called the Gaza genocide.

The linguist Matthias Becker says that the assertion that Jews or Israel supporters instrumentalize the Holocaust for political gain is inherently antisemitic. In contrast, Traverso argues that instrumentalization of the Holocaust could lead to Holocaust denial: "many will come to believe that the Holocaust is a myth invented to defend the interests of Israel and its allies".

== Other cases ==
Jelena Subotić argues that in post-Communist European countries such as Poland, Hungary, Lithuania and Serbia, the Holocaust narrative was repurposed to emphasize the historical victimhood of non-Jewish national majorities and to argue that Communist atrocities were equal or greater than those perpetrated by Nazi Germany.

In 2023, the Polish political party PiS released a political video including an image of Auschwitz concentration camp, which the Auschwitz Museum and other critics said instrumentalized the Holocaust.

== See also ==
- Pobedobesie (Russian: победобесие), a pejorative term for the instrumentalization of the Soviet victory against Nazi Germany to justify modern Russian imperialism
- Nazi analogies
- Holocaust trivialization
- Never again
