= Oppression Olympics =

Competitive type of victim mentality

"Oppression Olympics" is a critical term for a type of victim mentality that regards social marginalization as a competition to determine the relative degree of oppression of groups or individuals. Participants in an Oppression Olympics are characterized as comparing race, gender, religion, sexuality, socioeconomic status or disabilities—and various combinations of those factors—to decide who is the "most oppressed". This characterization often arises within debates about identity politics, intersectionality, and social privilege.

The term, derived from the Olympic Games with its focus on winning gold, silver and bronze medals, arose among feminist scholars in the 1990s to criticize the practice of viewing discrimination and marginalization in a competitive context. Arguing about which societal group experiences the most extreme hardships has been summarized as, "My pain is worse than your pain". Researchers in identity studies have also used the phrase "competitive victimhood".

== Dynamics ==
Anarchist writer Abbey Volcano described the Oppression Olympics as "a grand contest to assert who is more authentic, more oppressed, and thus more correct". The contest is waged on the basis of one's class, race, gender, disability (mental or physical), sexuality, among other stated or ascribed identities. A person's identity "become[s] fetishised" within the group and judged in essentialist terms. According to Stoyan Francis, "The gold medal of the Oppression Olympics is seen as the commanding spot for demanding change, for visibility and allocation of resources".

== Origins and usage ==
Chicana feminist Elizabeth "Betita" Martínez is often credited with coining the term. On May 12, 1993, she and Angela Davis spoke at a forum held at UC San Diego on "Building Coalitions of People of Color". Martinez responded to a question about coalition building as follows: "There are various forms of working together. A coalition is one, a network is another, an alliance is yet another. ... But the general idea is no competition of hierarchies should prevail. No Oppression Olympics!" Martinez was referencing how an "Oppression Olympics" mentality can erect unnecessary barriers between disadvantaged groups. Davis supported Martínez's response: "As Betita has pointed out, we need to be more flexible in our thinking about various ways of working together across differences."

Martínez would later write more extensively about the Oppression Olympics in her 1998 book, De Colores Means All of Us: Latina Views for a Multi-Colored Century. In the book's foreword, Davis states that Martínez "urges us not to engage in 'Oppression Olympics' [or create] a futile hierarchy of suffering, but, rather, to harness our rage at persisting injustices in order to strengthen our opposition to an increasingly complex system of domination, which weaves together racism, patriarchy, homophobia, and global capitalist exploitation".

In The Holocaust in American Life (1999), historian Peter Novick derived a related term, "Victimization Olympics", to describe how persecuted groups have vied to portray themselves as the most grievously oppressed, with Holocaust victims "intent on permanent possession of the gold medal". To illustrate the competition, Novick quotes an excerpt from an essay published by African-American author James Baldwin in 1967:

One does not wish...to be told by an American Jew that his suffering is as great as the American Negro's suffering. It isn't, and one knows that it isn't from the very tone in which he assures you that it is.... For it is not here, and not now, that the Jew is being slaughtered, and he is never despised, here, as the Negro is, because he is an American. The Jewish travail occurred across the sea and America rescued him from the house of bondage. But America is the house of bondage for the Negro, and no country can rescue him.

== Criticism ==
Anarchists, with their opposition to social hierarchies, reject the identity politics associated with the Oppression Olympics because, in their view, it tends to build new "inverted hierarchies"; and they have criticized the tactic of "agreeing with the most marginalized in the room" as an "intellectually lazy" substitute for in-depth political analysis.

In Solidarity Politics for Millennials: A Guide to Ending the Oppression Olympics (2011), Ange-Marie Hancock suggests that the motivation for the Oppression Olympics is the desire to "one-up" other victims. She argues that the energy spent within progressive circles on the Oppression Olympics has impeded collective action in furthering social change. She writes: "Thanks to the Oppression Olympics and the political complexity facing the twenty-first century, standing in solidarity for wide social transformation is increasingly difficult to begin and challenging to pursue."

== See also ==
- Fallacy of relative privation
- Critical theory
- Identity politics
- Intersectionality
- Kyriarchy
- Matrix of domination
- Narcissistic personality disorder
- Person of color
- Progressive stack
- Triple oppression
- Victim blaming
- Victim mentality
- Woke
