= I'll Burn That Bridge When I Get to It =

2023 book by Norman Finkelstein

I'll Burn That Bridge When I Get to It! Heretical Thoughts on Identity Politics, Cancel Culture, and Academic Freedom
- Author: Norman Finkelstein
- Published: 2023
- Publisher: Sublation Media
- ISBN: 979-8-9867884-2-5

I'll Burn That Bridge When I Get to It! Heretical Thoughts on Identity Politics, Cancel Culture, and Academic Freedom is a book by American political scientist Norman Finkelstein. It was inspired by an open letter published by Harper's Magazine titled "A Letter on Justice and Open Debate" and argues that some anti-racist, feminist, and LGBTQ politics undermines working class solidarity. The book was published in 2023 by Sublation Media. It includes criticisms of Robin DiAngelo, Kimberlé Crenshaw, and Ibram X. Kendi.

== Background and publication ==
Norman Finkelstein is an American political scientist, speaker and adjunct professor. In 2020, Harper's Magazine published an open letter entitled "Letter on Justice and Open Debate", which criticized cancel culture, and a former publisher of Finkelstein's work invited him to write a book on the topic raised by the open letter.

Many literary houses including former publishers of works by Finkelstein rejected his manuscript. Tariq Ali, an editor at Verso Books, who was also the publisher of Finkelstein's The Holocaust Industry (2000) cited that the rejection was because the book was not as effective at methodically dismantling its targets as Finkelstein's usual work. The manuscript was eventually accepted and subsequently published by Sublation Press under the title, I'll Burn That Bridge When I Get to It! Heretical Thoughts on Identity Politics, Cancel Culture, and Academic Freedom.

== Content ==
I'll Burn That Bridge When I Get to It is divided into two parts. The first part comprises four-fifths of the book's total length and argues that identity politics, or "woke politics" in Finkelstein's words, pervaded the politics of the United States and had "distracted from and, when need be, outright sabotaged" American politician Bernie Sanders's presidential campaigns in 2016 and in 2020, which Finkelstein considered "a class-based movement that promised profound social change". The book contends "wokeness" has undermined working class solidarity.

The remainder of the book's first part takes the form of strongly worded polemics attacking influential anti-racism advocates, including Robin DiAngelo, Kimberlé Crenshaw, and Ibram X. Kendi. He mocks requests for his gender pronouns, writing, "I'll tell you my pronouns if you tell me your net worth".

The book's second part is about academic freedom. Finkelstein argues that Holocaust deniers should not be barred from teaching, adding that he thinks they would "inoculate students" against their own claims anyway. I'll Burn That Bridge When I Get to It then sketches four historical cases about academic freedom involving Bertrand Russell, Leo Koch, Angela Davis, and Steven Salaita. Finkelstein bemoans his banning from Democracy Now!, repeating a joke he made to a Democracy Now! staffer that she "look[ed] so young, you could be one of Michael Jackson's playmates", in his words.

== Reception ==
I'll Burn That Bridge When I Get to It received limited attention upon its publication. The Drift reported that "[b]eyond a small corner of the Internet, few took notice of the book". British pacifist newspaper Peace News praised the book as a "powerful and much-needed critique". The Drift argued that the book "lacks a compelling critique of liberal identity politics—instead, much of it reads like a meandering diatribe". American progressive website Common Dreams states that it contains "very funny ridicule of everything and everyone", but also notes that the book is "an anguished cri de coeur against pervasive cultural, political, and intellectual rot." According to Avant-Garde, Finkelstein's liberal targets are "worthy of contempt", but he "lacks the empathy and moral authority to make his critique seem like anything other than bitter, gleeful, ad hominem attack". Multiple reviews noted how I'll Burn That Bridge When I Get to It handled the topic of gender.
