= Hua Xi (poet) =

Poet and artist

Hua Xi is a poet and artist. They have earned fellowships from the National Endowment for the Arts and Stanford University, as well as the Eavan Boland Emerging Poet Award, and their work has appeared in several publications like The Atlantic and Electric Literature.

== Career ==
Hua Xi's poems have been featured in The Yale Review, The Atlantic, The New Republic, The Nation, The Adroit Journal, Electric Literature, and more. Their reviews have been in The Harvard Review and The Observer. In 2019, Hua Xi's poems were selected the Boston Review Annual Poetry Contest by poetry judge Ladan Osman, who noted her poems "have a light touch, flexible but precise."

In 2022, Hua Xi was selected for the Gwenn A. Nusbaum/Walt Whitman Birthplace Association "Poets to Come" Scholarship. In 2023, she was chosen for a Creative Writing Fellowship with the National Endowment for the Arts. The same year, they were announced as a Stegner Fellowship in poetry, as well as a winner of the Eavan Boland Emerging Poet Award alongside Otto Goodwin.

Hua Xi was an interviews editor for Guernica but resigned in March 2024, along with several other volunteer staff, after the magazine published an essay that put forth a pro-Israel position with regard to the Israeli–Palestinian conflict, which it later retracted.

Hua Xi has also taught poetry workshops for the Spatial Poetry Project and serves as a poetry assistant for The Drift. They have cited Jericho Brown, Bhanu Kapil, and Rick Barot as influences.
