= United Nations Fact Finding Mission on the 2014 Israel–Gaza conflict =

Human rights commission

The United Nations Fact Finding Mission on the 2014 Israel–Gaza conflict was a United Nations fact-finding mission established by a resolution of the United Nations Human Rights Council (UNHRC) on 23 July 2014 to investigate "all violations of international humanitarian law and international human rights law ... in the context of the military operations conducted since 13 June 2014" in the Palestinian territories, particularly the Gaza Strip, during the 2014 Israel–Gaza conflict.

William Schabas was appointed chairman of the three-member committee. Amal Clooney (Lebanon) declined the nomination, and Doudou Diène (Senegal) accepted. Former US judge McGowan Davis joined the committee as the third member. On 2 February 2015, Schabas resigned after it was revealed that he had been a paid consultant for the PLO in 2012.

The final report of the committee was issued on 22 June 2015. The enquiry reported evidence of "serious violations" by both sides. Israel dismissed the investigation as "politically motivated and morally flawed", while Hamas said it wrongly equated "the victim and executioner". The report said 2,251 people, of whom 1,462 were civilians, were killed on the Palestinian side, 67 soldiers and 6 civilians on the Israeli side.

== Mandate of mission ==
The investigation was to investigate "purported violations of international humanitarian and human rights laws in the Occupied Palestinian Territory, including East Jerusalem, and particularly in the Gaza Strip since the conflict began on June 13." The committee's report was due in March 2015, but that was deferred to 29 June 2015 after the resignation of Schabas on 2 February 2015. The final report was issued on 22 June 2015.

== Mission members ==
On 11 August 2014, the UNHRC established a committee to investigate alleged war crimes during the 2014 Israel–Gaza conflict.

William Schabas, a Canadian professor of international law, was named chairman of the committee.

Amal Clooney, from Lebanon, was selected due to her expertise on international law. She turned down the offer.

Doudou Diène, from Senegal, was selected due to his expertise on racial discrimination.

Mary McGowan Davis, a former New York Supreme Court Judge, was selected on 25 August to be the third member, replacing Clooney.

=== Schabas controversy ===
Schabas's appointment was criticized by Canada's Foreign Minister John Baird and the Geneva-based advocacy NGO UN Watch, who called Schabas anti-Israel. Schabas dismissed Baird's accusation as absurd, noting that he, Schabas, was on the editorial board of the Israel Law Review. In reply to UN Watch's demand he recuse himself on the grounds that he had once criticized Benjamin Netanyahu, Schabas said: "Is everyone in Israel who has an opinion about Netanyahu anti-Israel?".

Schabas said at the time that there was some merit in comments by critics that Israel was being singled out by the UN for human rights violations, but added that double standards and bias in the UN works both ways, at times to Israel's advantage, citing the fact that the United States almost invariably vetoes resolutions critical of Israel in the Security Council.

The Israeli government condemned the appointment of Schabas, and Israel's Ambassador to the UN, Ron Prosor, said in an interview "Forming an investigatory committee headed by Schabas is like inviting ISIS to organize religious tolerance week at the UN."

On 2 February 2015, Schabas resigned after an Israeli complaint that he had billed the Palestine Liberation Organization for $1,300 in 2012 for legal advice he gave them at their request, a precedent which might constitute evidence of a conflict of interest with his position as head of the investigative committee. He stated that he did not want the controversy to overshadow the work of the Gaza inquiry. Prime Minister Benjamin Netanyahu called on the UNHRC to shelve its report due to Schabas's resignation. Avigdor Lieberman attributed Schabas's resignation to Israel's diplomatic work. According to Israeli commentator Gideon Levy, Schabas had fallen victim to investigative character assassination.

== Investigation ==
The investigation examined "alleged violations of international human rights law and international humanitarian law occurring between 13 June and 26 August 2014 across the Occupied Palestinian Territory, in particular in Gaza, and in Israel, and to determine whether such violations had been committed."

Israel refused to cooperate with the commission including denying access to the Occupied Palestinian territories and not responding to a list of questions relating to specific incidents. Israel claimed the investigation had already arrived at its conclusions in advance. As such, the commission was unable to conduct in-person interviews and had to obtain testimony by Skype or telephone. They were also unable to visit the sites where the alleged violations had occurred.

The State of Palestine fully cooperated with the investigation.

== Report ==
The 183 page report found evidence of war crimes by both Israel and Hamas.

The report criticized Israel for its disproportionate airstrikes that damaged approximately 18,000 dwellings, its indiscriminate use of weapons in civilian areas, the high number of civilian casualties in the Battle of Shuja'iyya and "Black Friday" attacks on Rafah, and for letting violations of international law by IDF soldiers go unpunished.

The report also found that rockets fired from Gaza into Israel by Hamas and other Palestinian militants were intended to spread terror.

Before stating its findings the commission affirmed that the Gaza Strip is occupied by Israel despite their withdrawal as "Israel has maintained effective control of the Gaza Strip within the meaning of Article 42 of the 1907 Hague Regulations." In its conclusion, the report calls on Israel "to lift, immediately and unconditionally, the blockade on Gaza," to cease settlments, and to abide by the ICJ's opinion in Legal Consequences of the Construction of a Wall in the Occupied Palestinian Territory.

== Reactions ==
=== Committee reactions ===
- Israel – The committee was criticized by Israel as being biased against Israel, and was to referred to by Israel as a kangaroo court. Israel's UN Ambassador, Ron Prosor, met with Secretary-General of the United Nations Ban Ki-moon, to request he condemn the appointment of Schabas, comparing his appointment to ISIS teaching religious tolerance. Netanyahu spoke out against the fact finding mission, stating that by investigating Israel, the UN is legitimizing what he said were terror groups like Hamas and ISIS.
- United States – US State Department spokeswoman Marie Harf criticized the committee by saying that although there are certain aspects that should be investigated, "there's a way to investigate things that's not one-sided and biased, and there's a way that we don't support."
- Palestinian Authority – Palestinian Authority Foreign Minister, Riyad al-Maliki, stated that he was confident that the committee would find Israel guilty of war crimes.
- Hamas senior official Ghazi Hamad said, "The report contains some positive paragraphs condemning the Israeli occupation, but it is equal between the victim and executioner."

=== Academic reactions ===
Norman Finkelstein heavily criticized the report in his book Gaza: An Inquest into Its Martyrdom, writing that the report "did chronicle, often in harrowing detail, the horrors that Israel inflicted on Gaza" but then "proceeded to render legal analyses that methodically, and in many instances, comically buffered the gravity of Israel's crimes." Finkelstein writes that the report attempts to create a false balance between the suffering of Israelis and Palestinians, despite the disproportionate civilian casualties suffered by Palestinians, by overemphasizing the psychological impact on Israelis. Finkelstein also disagreed with the report's findings on Hamas war crimes, writing that "it denied Gaza the 'inherent' right (anchored in the UN Charter) to armed self-defense, and the right ... of armed resistance in its self-determination struggle."

=== Military experts ===
Colonel Richard Kemp CBE (ret.), former Commander of British Forces in Afghanistan, stated that the committee's report was flawed and dangerous, "that can only provoke further violence and loss of life". Saying that the report starts with preoccupied attributions for responsibilities for the conflict to Israel's blockade of Gaza and the "protracted occupation of the West Bank and the Gaza Strip", he argues that Israel withdrew from Gaza 10 years ago and imposed a selective blockade only in response to attacks by Hamas (2007) and illegal imports of war materials from Iran. Judge Davis gave no evidence to substantiate the committee's claims of "serious violations of international humanitarian law and international human rights law" by the IDF, Kemp says. He also said that the committee self-admittedly lacked military expertise, and Kemp stated that the report is in deed "characterized by a lack of understanding of warfare", and that it "legitimizes Hamas's rocket and tunnel attacks and even sympathizes with the geographical challenges in launching rockets at Israeli civilians" out of densely populated areas, in violation of international humanitarian law.

== See also ==
- United Nations Fact Finding Mission on the Gaza Conflict
- International Criminal Court investigation in Palestine
