= The Holocaust in American Life =

1999 book by Peter Novick

- Author: Peter Novick
- Language: English
- Subject: History of Holocaust remembrance in the U.S.
- Publisher: Houghton Mifflin
- Publication date: 1999
- Publication place: United States
- Media type: Print (hardcover, paperback)
- ISBN: 0395840090

The Holocaust in American Life is a book of cultural history written by historian Peter Novick. Published by Houghton Mifflin in 1999, the book examines the historiography and remembrance of the Holocaust in the United States, with a focus on what Novick claims was a growing amount of attention paid in the latter decades of the 20th century. The question Novick seeks to answer is "why in 1990s America – fifty years after the fact and thousands of miles from its site – the Holocaust has come to loom so large in our culture". He also expresses skepticism that Holocaust preoccupation is "a healthy phenomenon for American society, its Jewish minority, and a balanced understanding of the Holocaust itself".

The book was reviewed by many Jewish magazines and other publications. While generally praised, it drew controversy because of its thesis that Holocaust commemoration in the U.S. was influenced by what has been termed the "politics of memory", and that the salience of the tragedy waxed and waned due, in part, to political calculations. The Holocaust in American Life was sometimes linked with Norman Finkelstein's even more controversial The Holocaust Industry (2000), which expanded on Novick's analysis and explicitly argued that "Holocaust memory" had become "an ideological construct of vested interests".

== Description ==
Novick writes in the Introduction that his historian's curiosity led him to pursue two puzzling lines of inquiry about "the prominent role the Holocaust has come to play in American Jewish and general American discourse":

1. Why now? He is referring to the then-recent surge in "Holocaust awareness" in the U.S. as evidenced by, for example, the increased observance of Days of Remembrance throughout the U.S.; the opening in 1993 of the Museum of Tolerance in Los Angeles and the Holocaust Memorial Museum in Washington, D.C.; and the release later that year of the Academy Award-winning film Schindler's List. Novick says that historical events are typically most talked about soon after their occurrence. In the case of World War I, "It was in the 1920s and 1930s, not the 1950s and 1960s, that novels, films, and collective consciousness were obsessed with the carnage of Passchendaele and the Somme." He wonders why there was this unusual chronology, a 20–25 year delay, in the case of the Holocaust.
2. Why here? He writes that it would have been far more understandable if the Holocaust dominated the culture of post-World War II Germany, or of Nazi-occupied European countries where Jewish citizens were either directly murdered or rounded up and deported to death camps. But the U.S. was thousands of miles away from those happenings, and Holocaust survivors composed only a tiny fraction of one percent of the American population. So why had the U.S. become such a hub of Holocaust remembrance?

Novick lists several causes for what he contends was a relative silence about the Holocaust in the post-WWII United States:

- The Soviet Union had become America's principal Cold War enemy, and West Germany a vital ally. Therefore, it was essential to focus national attention on Stalin's crimes, Gulag forced labor camps, and Soviet totalitarianism, not Nazism, as the great evil. In that political climate, the Holocaust was, in Novick's words, the "wrong atrocity" for purposes of galvanizing Cold War thinking.
- Jewish organizations were striving to combat a longtime stereotype that Jews were Communist sympathizers, a stereotype strengthened by the arrest and trial of Julius and Ethel Rosenberg. In late 1940s and early 1950s America, one of the few groups to frequently mention the Holocaust was the Communist Party USA, and the Rosenbergs themselves invoked it often. Jews who did not want to be tainted by that association were motivated to leave the subject alone.
- In the aftermath of World War II, American Jews believed it was prudent to reject a victim identity, and this resulted in a decision to downplay the Holocaust. As Enzo Traverso writes, "It was a period where heroes, not victims, were in the limelight and the show of strength was a national virtue. Jews wished to identify with and assimilate into victorious America, and certainly did not want to appear as a community of victims."

Novick mentions a few exceptions to the mid-1940s – mid-1960s "quiet period" about the Holocaust, such as (1) the 1952 U.S. publication of The Diary of Anne Frank and its subsequent play adaptation in 1955 and film adaptation in 1959; and (2) the Judgment at Nuremberg television play in 1959 and its film version in 1961, but he adds that the two films "were not hits at the box office". He also observes that in the early 1960s, there was a slight loosening of the Cold War culture which had previously inhibited discussion of the Holocaust. As illustrations, he references William Shirer's bestseller The Rise and Fall of the Third Reich (1960) and the widely publicized capture, trial, and execution of Nazi SS officer and convicted war criminal Adolf Eichmann in 1960-62.

In the late 1960s and '70s, Novick identifies a dramatic culture shift in the U.S.—what he calls "the new centering of the Holocaust in American Jewish consciousness"—and he says it was mainly a consequence of the Six-Day Arab-Israeli War in June 1967 and then, even more significantly, the Yom Kippur War in October 1973. He writes that after those two military conflicts, the invocation of the Holocaust when discussing Israel's security concerns became "a deliberate strategy for mobilizing support for Israel among American Jews, among the general American public, and in the American government". He notes that during this same time period, perceptions of growing anti-Semitism in the U.S. played a role in feeding the Jewish sense of peril, which made the Holocaust an "eternal truth" to be always mindful of:

[T]he Holocaust came to symbolize the natural and inevitable terminus of anti-Semitism: first stop, an anti-Semitic joke; last stop, Treblinka. Every loudmouthed Farrakhan acolyte was the opening act in the Julius Streicher Show. The insistence on the incomprehensibility and inexplicability of the Holocaust furthered this inclination. If the Holocaust defied rational explanation, who could know what trivial event might be the precursor to "the ovens"? With this mindset, there could be no such thing as overreaction to an anti-Semitic incident, no such thing as exaggerating the omnipresent danger. Anyone who scoffed at the idea that there were dangerous portents in American society hadn't learned "the lesson of the Holocaust".

Among the other factors Novick cites as contributing to the culture shift was the worry felt within Jewish organizations that American Jews were "over-assimilated", for example, their intermarriage levels had reached 50 percent by 1990. With Jewish religious beliefs and practices seemingly on the decline, the Holocaust was "the only symbol to which all Jews could feel a strong sense of connection". Jewish communal leaders found that the most effective way to combat assimilation and ensure the survival of an American Jewish population was to promote a "Holocaust-centered Jewish identity". Novick charts the late-20th century rise of identity politics as allowing this new identity to flourish. He uses the term "Victimization Olympics" to describe how marginalized groups started "competing" to portray themselves as the most grievously persecuted, with Holocaust victims "intent on permanent possession of the gold medal".

Novick asks whether, in 1990s America, the heightened Holocaust sensitivity is a desirable state of affairs. He sees its effect as:

[a diminished] integrationist ethos (which focused on what Americans have in common and what unites us) and its replacement by a particularist ethos (which stresses what differentiates and divides us). The leaders of American Jewry, who once upon a time had sought to demonstrate that Jews were "just like everybody else, except more so," now had to establish, for both Jews and gentiles, what there was about Jews that made them different.

He questions whether the Holocaust is really what Jews want to be most known by.

In a final provocative point, Novick says he is dubious about "the usefulness of the Holocaust as a bearer of lessons. In large part these doubts are based on the Holocaust's extremity, which on the one hand makes its practical lessons of little applicability to everyday life; on the other hand makes anything to which it is compared look 'not so bad.'"

== Critical reception ==
In The New York Times book review, Lawrence Langer praised Novick for challenging conventional wisdom about the Holocaust and forcing readers to reconsider traditional perspectives:

[T]his is the real merit of his volume. Much ink has been spilled on the issue of whether the Holocaust is unique, but Novick asks what we would accomplish even if we could prove that it was. Those who feel that it is more important to explore an episode in history than to define it will be cheered by this question. But others will argue that Nazi Germany's decision to invade more than a dozen countries with the eventual intention of murdering every last Jew in the territories under its control was indeed unprecedented, and knowing this contributes to our understanding of what Hitler and his cohorts called "the final solution of the Jewish question in Europe". Novick does not quell the dispute, but he introduces some provocative rejoinders to those who believe that it has already been settled.

In a similar vein, Eva Hoffman wrote that "Novick's deconstruction of the American politics of memory—its distortions and hidden uses—is daring, often brilliant, and powerfully illuminating. Insofar as the Holocaust has become central to our obsession with memory, his study should have wider reverberations. Certainly, our comprehension of the Holocaust's history in America will never be the same after his book."

In a review in the journal Jewish History, Natan Sznaider concurred with Novick that the increased attention given to the Holocaust in the U.S. had led to a kind of vulgarization of the event:

The Nazis fought two wars in World War II. The war to take over the world, they lost. But the war to make Europe almost "Judenrein", they won. The major thesis of Novick's fascinating account of the politics of collective memory is that the emphasis in the USA has moved from memorializing the war against the Allies to memorializing the war against the Jews. Novick regrets this development, and his regrets form the thrust of his study.... It seems natural and right to him that the formation of collective memory should be an arena of political contestation – that it should be a place where different groups with different narratives compete over what should be the nation's central symbols. What Novick deplores is not that memory is put to use, but that it is put to bad use. He deplores what he sees as the banality of the Holocaust story in American society. He compares it unfavorably to the way the Holocaust is remembered in Germany, Israel, Poland, or France.

Norman Finkelstein helped fuel controversy about Novick's book in an essay published in the January 2000 issue of London Review of Books. When referring to Novick's depiction of a muted post-WWII Holocaust response in the U.S., Finkelstein praised the author for linking the phenomenon to the mandates of Cold War politics: "Novick convincingly argues that American Jews 'forgot' about the Holocaust because Germany was an American ally in the Cold War. The editor of Commentary urged the importance of encouraging Jews to develop a 'realistic attitude rather than a punitive and recriminatory one' towards Germany, which was now a pillar of 'Western democratic civilisation'". Finkelstein also agreed with Novick that the connection between American Jews and Israel was less strong pre-1967 when "only one in twenty American Jews had visited Israel":

But as Novick makes clear, all this changed after the Arab-Israeli War in 1967: the Holocaust was "discovered" by American Jews, the Holocaust industry began to materialise and American Jewish organisations began to identify more closely with Israel. Why? Novick argues that Israel seemed "poised on the brink of destruction" during the 1967 war, and so the Final Solution was "suddenly transformed from 'mere', albeit tragic history, to imminent and terrifying prospect". The "discovery" of the Holocaust came about because American Jews feared that it might be repeated: it related to a perception of the danger faced by Israel. Novick is less convincing here than in other parts of his illuminating book. He is right about the timing of the discovery of the Holocaust but wrong about the reason.

Finkelstein's reason, as presented in this LRB essay and elaborated on in The Holocaust Industry (2000), puts a more conspiratorial spin on Holocaust remembrance and its manipulation. In his book's Introduction, Finkelstein credited Novick with providing the "initial stimulus" for his own research, and said The Holocaust in American Life belongs to "the venerable tradition of American muckraking".

Hasia Diner labeled Novick and Finkelstein "harsh critics of American Jewry from the left", and she challenged the assertion in their books that the U.S. Jewish community did not begin to commemorate the Holocaust until after the 1967 Arab-Israeli War. She characterized the argument put forth by Novick and Finkelstein as the "myth of silence".

In a 2003 article in Holocaust and Genocide Studies, Lawrence Baron conceded there is "some validity to Peter Novick's recent claim that the term 'Holocaust' became prominent in American Jewish life only after the Eichmann trial, Israel's 1967 triumph in the Six-Day War, and the surprise attack by Egypt and costly victory by Israel in the 1973 Yom Kippur War". However, Baron said that Novick was undervaluing the process by which a tragedy of that magnitude penetrates public consciousness:

If Americans did not understand the Holocaust in the ways they do today, it does not mean they lacked awareness of the event or repressed the memory of it.... In the aftermath of a cataclysm, people tend to incorporate their experience into familiar conceptual frameworks that reinforce their existing belief systems. What appears in retrospect to have been the repression of memory actually entailed an extensive discourse that played a significant role in the Allied war crimes trials, Cold War anticommunism, historical interest in the Third Reich, postwar philosophical debates, religious reforms intended to improve Jewish-Christian relations, and American Jewry's efforts to combat antisemitism and win sympathy for Israel."

Some reviewers took issue with the tone of The Holocaust in American Life. Alan Steinweis wrote that the "many polemical (at times sarcastic) passages will bother some readers who expect a more respectful tone in a study of Holocaust memory. Substantively, aside from its central point that the Holocaust is disproportionately pervasive in American life, the book is provocative in its account of how Jewish leaders, organizations, and Holocaust 'memory professionals' have consciously and methodically instrumentalized the Holocaust in support of various causes, most notably the state of Israel." Michiko Kakutani faulted Novick for "deliberate cynicism" and a "willfully contrarian attitude", and suggested that the book's "flippant tone reflects Novick's determination to not merely demystify the Holocaust, but to diminish its place in the collective imagination".

In the Spring 2001 issue of Jewish Social Studies, Berel Lang wrote a scathing review of the book, stating that there is a "thread of mean-spirited moralism" running through it, and that none of Novick's conclusions follow from his premises. Lang strongly disagreed that the "hyping" of the Holocaust was a conscious decision by Jewish leaders:

Exactly who, in order to further its dubious means (also its dubious ends), orchestrated this campaign for Holocaust-centrism, and how did they manage it so effectively? Also, at this crux in the line of his argument, Novick protects himself by evasion; the insinuation is categorical—but the evidence is missing. That there has been such a campaign is a condition for the phenomenon: accidents like that do not happen. But then, there should have been (and be) active conspirators, bent on Holocaust-centrism for the reasons Novick identified, yet the evidence for this is shaky.

In the same journal issue, Eli Lederhendler offered a nuanced review, praising how "Novick, in dealing with a notoriously difficult and emotionally laden topic, has done very well by his readers, with only a few lapses of proportion or emphasis. I trust that The Holocaust in American Life will spark a great deal of healthy controversy, and I believe that was its author's purpose in writing it." Lederhendler's two principal criticisms were: (1) Novick underestimated the influence of the Holocaust on American Jewry in the first decade after the war, and (2) Novick gave the Jewish organizational establishment undue credit (or blame, depending on one's viewpoint) for the surge in Holocaust consciousness in the mid-1970s. In a response published in the same issue of Jewish Social Studies, Novick replied to Lang's and Lederhendler's criticisms.

== See also ==
- The Holocaust Industry
- Politics of memory
- United States and the Holocaust
