= Holocaust memory in pro-Palestinian activism =

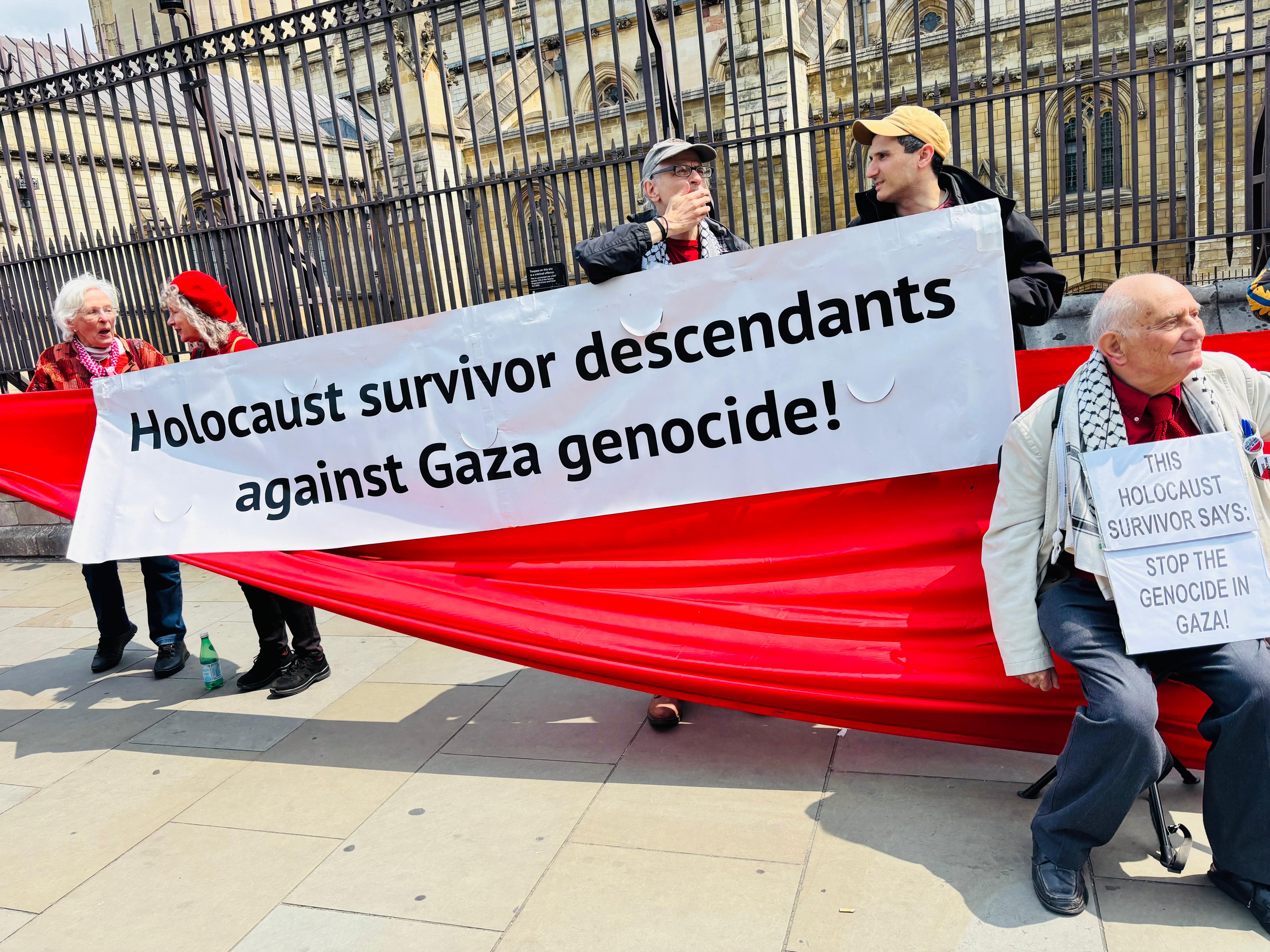
Descendants of Holocaust survivors demonstrating in London for Palestine, June 2025

Holocaust memory in pro-Palestinian activism is the invocation and use of Holocaust memory by activists to advocate for Palestinian rights and criticize Israeli policies.

Scholarship by, among others, Ussama Makdisi and Raz Segal has examined how Holocaust memory is mobilized to justify Israeli state violence and marginalize pro-Palestinian activism. Scholars have also analyzed how activists understand their position within broader debates about Holocaust memory, Jewish political identity, and the Israeli–Palestinian conflict.

Critics have characterized some such uses as a co-option or misuse of Holocaust memory and, in the case of Nazi–Israel analogies, as "Holocaust inversion".

== "Never again" and Holocaust memory ==
Political scientist Zahi Zalloua noted that pro-Palestinian activists, including Holocaust survivors and descendants, invoke "Never again" as a universal principle to argue that Holocaust memory obligates opposition to all forms of genocide, and they frame their activism as refusing the use of Holocaust memory to justify violence.

Vanessa E. Thompson and Pinar Tuzcu, Queen's University at Kingston gender and sociology academics, note that in response to what they describe as the criminalization of Palestine solidarity in Germany, which they say reflects a nationalist and racist memory politics that treats the Holocaust as a singular event, activists have adopted a universal interpretation of "Never again" that applies to everyone, while adopting "a memory politics that articulates through present struggle and solidarity."

According to Sim Kern, an environmental journalist, speculative fiction writer and activist, while Zionist narratives often frame the slogan as referring exclusively to Jewish security, anti-Zionist Jews (including Holocaust survivors and descendants of survivors) invoke Holocaust history as a universal moral principle opposing all forms of genocide.

Historian Maud Mandel has written about how Jewish radical left activists in postwar France, many of them descendants of Holocaust survivors or families that escaped Nazi persecution, interpreted the lessons of the Holocaust in universal rather than nationalist terms. Mandel notes that for these figures, opposing fascism and racism meant embracing internationalist and anti-colonial politics, leading many to reject Zionism and nationalism more broadly, particularly after 1967, when images of Israeli occupation conflicted with enduring memories of Jewish victimhood and resistance. She highlights figures such as Maxime Rodinson, a prominent critic of Zionism; Rabbi Emmanuel Lévyne, whose father was murdered in Auschwitz and who denounced what he termed the "Israelization" of French Jewish life; journalist Ania Francos, whose family was killed in the Holocaust and who supported Palestinian movements; and activists such as Patrick Rabiaz, who explicitly compared Zionist oppression of Palestinians to his family's suffering in Nazi concentration camps. Mandel situates these positions within a broader current on the Jewish left that viewed solidarity with Palestinians as a continuation of the moral and political commitments forged in the aftermath of the Holocaust.

After the beginning of the Gaza war, journalist Masha Gessen wrote an essay on Holocaust memory in The New Yorker in which they compared Gaza to Jewish ghettoes under the Nazis, and Israeli actions in the war to the liquidation of those ghettoes. While Gessen qualified the comparison by noting "essential differences" between Israel and Nazi Germany, they argued that comparison was necessary if the promise of "Never Again" was to have preventative meaning.

== Holocaust comparisons ==
In discussing criticism of Israel over its treatment of Palestinians, scholars Lesley Klaff, Jan Grabowski and Deborah Lipstadt describe Holocaust analogies equating Israelis with Nazis as "Holocaust inversion". Klaff characterizes it as a "double inversion" by casting Zionists as Nazis and framing the Holocaust as a moral lesson for its victims. She describes this as a misuse of Holocaust memory with broad negative consequences. Lipstadt characterizes Israeli-Nazi comparisons as "a form of softcore Holocaust denial, in which the event to which it is being compared shares none of the characteristics of the Holocaust", while stressing that criticism of Israeli policies, however severe, does not itself constitute antisemitism.

Holocaust historian Jan Grabowski has criticized pro-Palestinian protests and the use of genocide and Holocaust-related language in the Gaza war, arguing that the term "genocide" can become a political slogan and that comparisons between Israel and Nazi Germany distort Holocaust history. Grabowski says that the use of Holocaust comparisons collapses the Holocaust into a generic symbol of evil that loses its distinct characteristics.

== Holocaust memory and Israeli policy ==
In 2010, political analyst and journalist Hasan Afif El-Hasan documented opposition to Zionist memory politics from within Israeli society, citing historian and Holocaust survivor Zeev Sternhell, who publicly condemned Israeli settlements and opposed the occupation, presenting Sternhell's activism as an example of survivors invoking their historical experience to oppose policies they viewed as unjust.

== Critiques of Zionism and perceived instrumentalization of the Holocaust and antisemitism ==
Historian Ussama Makdisi argues that what he called the "Palestine exception" rests on Holocaust memory overriding Palestinian history. In his account, this framework recasts Palestinian opposition to Zionism as antisemitism rather than as a response to dispossession, allowing Israel to occupy the position of ultimate victim while Palestinian history and suffering are marginalized.

Raz Segal and Luigi Daniele argue that Holocaust and Genocide Studies have frequently treated Israel as exceptional while marginalizing Israeli violence against Palestinians.

Drawing on historian Dirk Moses's account of the German Holocaust-memory "catechism", Zahi Zalloua argues that a framework combining Germany's special loyalty to Israel with the equation of anti-Zionism and antisemitism uses Holocaust memory to shield Israel from scrutiny and casts political resistance to Israeli occupation as illegitimate violence.

Thompson and Tuzcu similarly analyze the policing and shutdown of the April 2024 Palestine Congress in Berlin as an instance in which Holocaust memory politics were used to constrain Palestine-solidarity activism.

Marianne Hirsch, a scholar of transgenerational trauma, wrote that "After October 7, we are seeing how, at moments of crisis and danger, the phantom of the Holocaust can resurface to reactivate trauma in Jewish communities for those who were there. But we are also seeing how it activates inherited trauma for those who, decidedly, were not there", and references the works of Art Spiegelman (Maus) to explain the ways in which the traumas of the past can intermingle with the traumas of the present.

== Criticism ==
Scholar Donna Robinson Divine characterizes the use of Holocaust memory in pro-Palestinian activism as a co-option of part of the modern Jewish experience.

Sociologist David Hirsh argues that some Jewish and other anti-Zionists "flirt with Holocaust denial" by defending comparisons between Israel and Nazi Germany.

== See also ==
- List of Jewish anti-Zionist organizations
- Holocaust uniqueness debate
- Instrumentalization of the Holocaust
