= Norman Finkelstein =

American political scientist (born 1953)

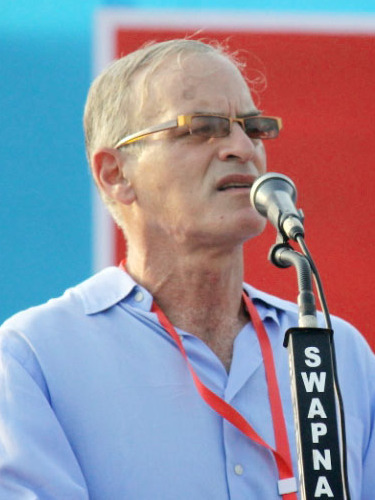
- Finkelstein in 2013
- Born: Norman Gary Finkelstein; December 8, 1953 (age 72); New York City, U.S.
- Education: Binghamton University (BA); École pratique des hautes études; Princeton University (MA, PhD)
- Occupations: Professor; author
- Notable work: The Holocaust Industry (2000)
- Website: normanfinkelstein.com

Norman Gary Finkelstein (/ˈfɪŋkəlstiːn/ FING-kəl-steen; born December 8, 1953) is an American political scientist and activist. His primary fields of research are the politics of the Holocaust and the Israeli–Palestinian conflict.

Finkelstein was born in New York City to Jewish Holocaust-survivor parents. He is a graduate of Binghamton University and received his Ph.D. in political science from Princeton University. He has held faculty positions at Brooklyn College, Rutgers University, Hunter College, New York University, and DePaul University, where he was an assistant professor from 2001 to 2007. In 2006, the department and college committees at DePaul University voted to grant Finkelstein tenure. For undisclosed reasons the university administration did not tenure him, and he announced his resignation after coming to a settlement with the university.

Finkelstein rose to prominence in 2000 after publishing The Holocaust Industry, a book in which he writes that the memory of the Holocaust is exploited as an ideological weapon to provide Israel a degree of immunity from criticism. He is a critic of Israeli policy and its governing class. The Israeli government barred him from entry to the country for ten years in 2008. Finkelstein has called Israel the "Jewish supremacist state", and views it as committing the crime of apartheid against the Palestinian people. Finkelstein's most recent books are Gaza: An Inquest into Its Martyrdom (2018) and Gaza's Gravediggers: An Inquiry Into Corruption in High Places (2026).

== Early life and education ==
Norman Finkelstein was born on December 8, 1953, in New York City, the son of Harry and Maryla (née Husyt) Finkelstein. Finkelstein's parents were Jewish Holocaust survivors. His mother grew up in Warsaw and survived the Warsaw Ghetto and the Majdanek concentration camp. His father was a survivor of both the Warsaw Ghetto and the Auschwitz concentration camp. After the war they met in a displaced persons camp in Linz, Austria, and then emigrated to the United States, where his father became a factory worker and his mother a homemaker and later a bookkeeper. Finkelstein's mother was an ardent pacifist. Both his parents died in 1995.

Finkelstein has said of his parents that "they saw the world through the prism of the Nazi Holocaust. They were eternally indebted to the Soviet Union (to whom they attributed the defeat of the Nazis), and so anyone who was anti-Soviet they were extremely harsh on". They supported the Soviet Union's approval of the creation of the State of Israel, as enunciated by Andrei Andreyevich Gromyko, who said that Jews had earned the right to a state, but thought that Israel had sold its soul to the West and "refused to have any truck with it".

Finkelstein grew up in Borough Park, then Mill Basin, both in Brooklyn, New York, where he attended James Madison High School. In his memoir he recalls strongly identifying with the outrage that his mother, who witnessed the genocidal atrocities of World War II, felt at the carnage the United States wrought in the Vietnam War. One childhood friend recalled his mother's "emotional investment in left-wing humanitarian causes as bordering on hysteria". He "internalized [her] indignation", a trait he admits rendered him "insufferable" when talking about the Vietnam War and gave him a "holier-than-thou" attitude he now regrets. But Finkelstein regards his absorption of his mother's outlook—the refusal to put aside a sense of moral outrage in order to get on with one's life—as a virtue. Later, reading Noam Chomsky played a role in learning to apply the moral passions his mother bequeathed to him with intellectual rigor.

Finkelstein completed his undergraduate studies at Binghamton University in New York in 1974, after which he studied at the École Pratique des Hautes Études in 1979 in Paris. He was an ardent Maoist from his teenage years on and was "totally devastated" by the news of the trial of the Gang of Four in 1976, which led him to conclude he had been misled.

Finkelstein received his master's degree in political science in 1980, and his PhD in political studies from Princeton in 1988. He is a member of Phi Beta Kappa. His doctoral thesis is on Zionism. Before gaining academic employment, Finkelstein was a part-time social worker with teenage dropouts in New York.

According to Finkelstein, his involvement in the Israeli–Palestinian conflict began in 1982 when he and a handful of other Jews in New York protested against the Israeli invasion of Lebanon. He held a sign saying: "This son of survivors of the Warsaw Ghetto Uprising, Auschwitz, Maijdenek will not be silent: Israeli Nazis – Stop the Holocaust in Lebanon!"

During the First Intifada, he spent every summer from 1988 in the West Bank as a guest of Palestinian families in Hebron and Beit Sahour, where he taught English at a local school. Finkelstein wrote that the fact that he was Jewish didn't bother most Palestinians: "The typical response was indifference. Word had been passed to the shebab that I was 'okay' and, generally, the matter rested there." He recounted his experiences of the intifada in his 1996 book The Rise and Fall of Palestine.

== Academic career ==
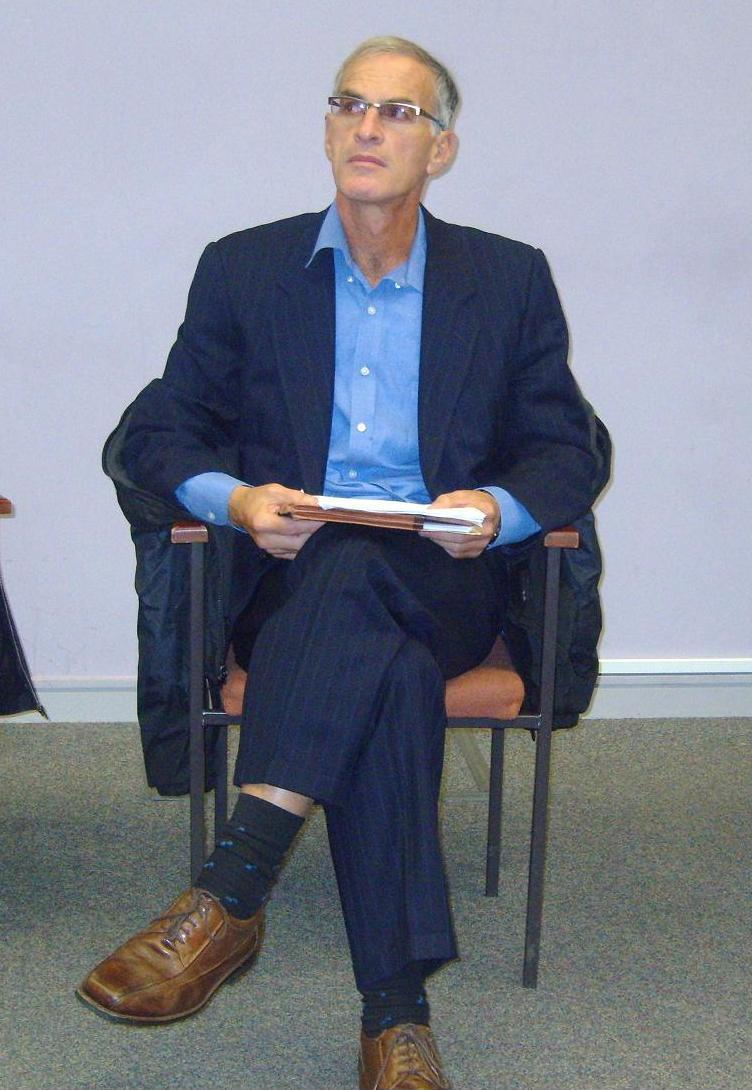
Finkelstein at the University of Leeds in 2009

Finkelstein first taught at Rutgers University as an adjunct lecturer in international relations (1977–78), then at Brooklyn College (1988–1991), Hunter College (1992–2001), New York University (1992–2001), and DePaul University (2001–2007). The New York Times reported that Finkelstein left Hunter College in 2001 "after his teaching load and salary were reduced" by the college administration. He has said he enjoyed teaching at Hunter and was "unceremoniously kicked out" after begging the college to keep him on with just two courses a semester for $12,000 a year. Hunter set conditions that would have required him to spend four days a week teaching, which he thought unacceptable. Finkelstein taught at Sakarya University Middle East Institute in Turkey in 2014–15.

== Writings ==
Finkelstein has described himself as a "forensic" scholar who has worked to demystify what he considers pseudo-scholarly arguments. He has written scathing academic reviews of several prominent writers and scholars who he says misrepresent facts in order to defend Israel's policies and practices. His writings have dealt with politically charged topics such as Zionism, the demographic history of Palestine, and his allegations of the existence of a "Holocaust industry" that exploits the memory of the Holocaust to further Israeli political interests. He has also described himself as "an old-fashioned communist", in the sense that he "see[s] no value whatsoever in states."

Finkelstein's work has been praised by scholars such as Noam Chomsky, the political scientist Raul Hilberg, and historian Avi Shlaim, and his advocates and detractors have remarked on his polemical style.

=== On From Time Immemorial ===
Finkelstein's doctoral thesis formed the basis for his interest in examining the claims made in Joan Peters's From Time Immemorial, a best-selling book at the time. Peters's "history and defense" of Israel deals with the demographic history of Palestine. Demographic studies had tended to assert that the Arab population of Ottoman-controlled Palestine, a 94% majority at the turn of the century, had dwindled toward parity due to massive Zionist immigration. Peters radically challenged this view by arguing that a substantial portion of the Palestinians were descended from immigrants from other Arab countries from the early 19th century onward. It followed, for Peters and many of her readers, that the picture of a native Palestinian population overwhelmed by Jewish immigration was little more than propaganda, and that in actuality two almost simultaneous waves of immigration met in what had been a relatively unpopulated land.

From Time Immemorial was praised by figures as varied as Barbara Tuchman, Theodore H. White, Elie Wiesel, and Lucy Dawidowicz. Saul Bellow wrote in a jacket endorsement, "Millions of people the world over, smothered by false history and propaganda, will be grateful for this clear account of the origins of the Palestinians."

Finkelstein called the book a "monumental hoax". He later opined that, while Peters's book received widespread interest and approval in the United States, a scholarly demonstration of its fraudulence and unreliability aroused little attention:

By the end of 1984, From Time Immemorial had...received some two hundred [favorable] notices ... in the United States. The only "false" notes in this crescendoing chorus of praise were the Journal of Palestine Studies, which ran a highly critical review by Bill Farrell; the small Chicago-based newsweekly In These Times, which published a condensed version of this writer's findings; and Alexander Cockburn, who devoted a series of columns in The Nation exposing the hoax. ... The periodicals in which From Time Immemorial had already been favorably reviewed refused to run any critical correspondence (e.g., The New Republic, The Atlantic Monthly, Commentary). Periodicals that had yet to review the book rejected a manuscript on the subject as of little or no consequence (e.g., The Village Voice, Dissent, The New York Review of Books). Not a single national newspaper or columnist contacted found it newsworthy that a best-selling, effusively praised "study" of the Middle East conflict was a threadbare hoax.

According to Adam Shatz, "when Finkelstein showed that Peters had manipulated Ottoman demographic records to make her case, the book's supporters attacked him as an anti-Zionist. By 1986, though, Zionist scholars having published articles that bolstered Finkelstein's case, his version was the conventional wisdom."

In Understanding Power, Noam Chomsky wrote that Finkelstein sent his preliminary findings to about 30 people interested in the topic, but no one replied except for him, and that was how they became friends:

I told him, yeah, I think it's an interesting topic, but I warned him, if you follow this, you're going to get in trouble—because you're going to expose the American intellectual community as a gang of frauds, and they are not going to like it, and they're going to destroy you. So I said: if you want to do it, go ahead, but be aware of what you're getting into. It's an important issue, it makes a big difference whether you eliminate the moral basis for driving out a population—it's preparing the basis for some real horrors—so a lot of people's lives could be at stake. But your life is at stake too, I told him, because if you pursue this, your career is going to be ruined. Well, he didn't believe me. We became very close friends after this, I didn't know him before.

According to Chomsky, the controversy over Finkelstein's research caused a delay in his earning his Ph.D. at Princeton University. Chomsky wrote that Finkelstein could not get the faculty to read his dissertation, and that Princeton eventually granted Finkelstein his doctorate only "out of embarrassment" and refused to give him any further professional backing.

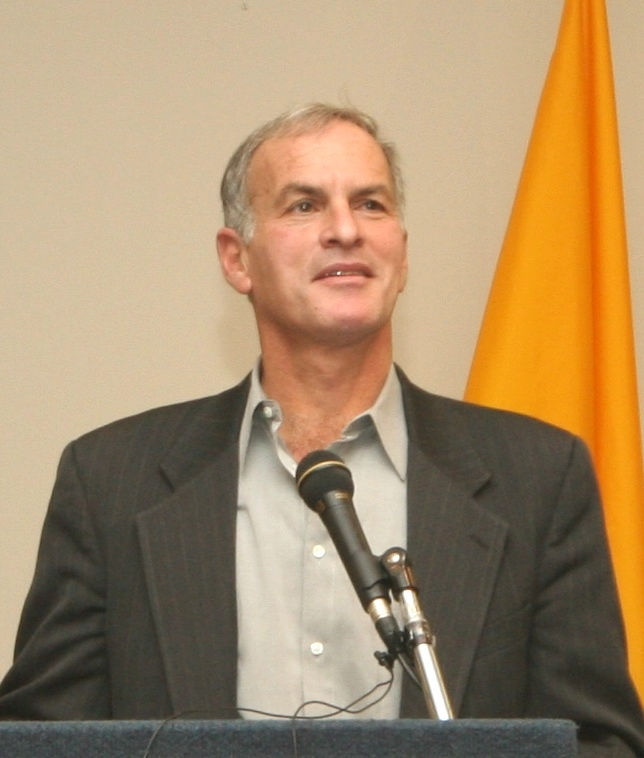
Finkelstein in 2005

In a 1996 Foreign Affairs review of a subsequent book, William B. Quandt called Finkelstein's critique of From Time Immemorial a "landmark essay" that helped demonstrate Peters's "shoddy scholarship". Israeli historian Avi Shlaim later praised Finkelstein's thesis, saying that it had established his credentials when he was still a doctoral student. In Shlaim's view, Finkelstein had produced an "unanswerable case" with "irrefutable evidence" that Peters's book was "preposterous and worthless".

=== The Rise and Fall of Palestine ===
In 1996, Finkelstein published The Rise and Fall of Palestine: A Personal Account of the Intifada Years, which chronicled his visits to the West Bank during the First Intifada. Through personal accounts, he compares the plight of the Palestinians living under the Israeli occupation with the horrors of the Nazis.

The book was unfavorably reviewed by Joost Hiltermann, who objected to Finkelstein's "abrasiveness, righteous anger, hyperbole, distortions and unwarranted generalizations", and to his generalizations about West Bank Palestinians:

Finkelstein commits the error of assuming that he saw everything there was to see during his trips to the West Bank, and that what he saw represented reality. This leads to absurd observations. He claims, for example, that "many Palestinians are fluent in English" (p. 4), that "many" homes he visited were "equipped with the latest, wide-screen, color models" of television (p. 6), and that "women wore bikinis at the beach" (p. 18).

Hiltermann wrote that while "there is plenty of reason to be anguished about the terrible injustice inflicted upon the Palestinian", Finkelstein's "bludgeoning" style wouldn't reach an audience beyond those already converted.

=== A Nation on Trial ===
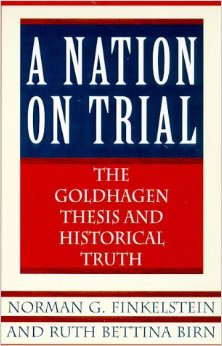
Cover of the revised Finkelstein–Birn edition of A Nation on Trial

In 1996, Harvard historian Daniel Jonah Goldhagen published Hitler's Willing Executioners: Ordinary Germans and the Holocaust, in which he argued that the vast majority of ordinary Germans were "willing executioners" in the Holocaust because of a unique and virulent "eliminationist antisemitism" in German political culture. Finkelstein's critique, "Daniel Jonah Goldhagen's 'Crazy' Thesis", was published in New Left Review and excerpted in Der Spiegel and Italy's Panorama. In the essay, Finkelstein places the term "holocaust" in lower case to "universalize events and thereby downgrade the significance of the Holocaust for Jewish history".

Metropolitan Books, an imprint of Henry Holt and Company, announced it would publish a revised version of the essay, along with that of German-born historian Ruth Bettina Birn that had been published in the Cambridge Historical Journal, under the title A Nation on Trial: The Goldhagen Thesis and Historical Truth. Leon Wieseltier and the Anti-Defamation League’s Abraham Foxman unsuccessfully pressured Metropolitan to cancel it. Columbia University's István Deák backed out of writing a preface but did endorse the book, along with historians Raul Hilberg, Christopher Browning, Pierre Vidal-Naquet, and Eric Hobsbawm.

The book slightly tones down the essay, with Goldhagen describing the revision as the "sanitized", "excised" and "coverup" version. According to Adam Shatz, Finkelstein's arguments in the book are that only a minority of Germans voted for the Nazis, that antisemitism wasn't Hitler's primary appeal to the German people, that "Germans overwhelmingly condemned the Nazi anti-Semitic atrocities", and that Goldhagen's book was successful because of its Zionist agenda. Shatz suggests that these points are either exaggerated or not new:

Israeli intellectuals such as Amos Elon and Tom Segev and the Holocaust historian Omer Bartov have made similar points about the ideological subtext of Holocaust writing. But they also take pains not to dismiss the trauma the Holocaust visited and continues to visit upon Jews. By contrast, Finkelstein adopts an ugly conspiratorial tone when he attributes the book's popularity in the United States to its Zionist message.

=== The Holocaust Industry ===
The Holocaust Industry: Reflections on the Exploitation of Jewish Suffering was published in 2000. In this work, Finkelstein argues that Elie Wiesel and others exploit the memory of the Holocaust as an "ideological weapon". Their purpose, he writes, is to enable Israel, "one of the world's most formidable military powers, with a horrendous human rights record, [to] cast itself as a victim state"; that is, to provide Israel "immunity to criticism". He alleges "a repellent gang of plutocrats, hoodlums and hucksters" have sought enormous legal damages and financial settlements from Germany and Switzerland, money that then goes to the lawyers and institutional actors involved in procuring them rather than actual Holocaust survivors. In a television interview to publicize the book, he said a "handful of American Jews have effectively hijacked the Nazi Holocaust to blackmail Europe" to "divert attention from what is being done to the Palestinians".

The book was received negatively in many quarters, with critics charging that it was poorly researched and/or allowed others to exploit it for antisemitic purposes. The German historian Hans Mommsen disparaged the first edition as "a most trivial book, which appeals to easily aroused anti-Semitic prejudices". Israeli Holocaust historian Israel Gutman called it "a lampoon, which takes a serious subject and distorts it for improper purposes. I don't even think it should be reviewed or critiqued as a legitimate book." The Holocaust Industry was also harshly criticized by Brown University Professor Omer Bartov, University of Chicago Professor Peter Novick and other reviewers accusing Finkelstein of selective or dubious evidence and misinterpretation of history. At the time the book was published in Germany, Der Spiegel reported the country was "in the grip of Holocaust madness. Finkelstein is being taken seriously. What he says corresponds with what many who do not know the facts think." In an interview, Finkelstein said, "the Holocaust is a political weapon. Germans have legitimate reasons to defend themselves against this abuse".

In an August 2000 interview for Swiss National Radio, Holocaust historian Raul Hilberg said the book expressed views Hilberg held, in that he too found "detestable" the exploitation of the Holocaust by groups such as the World Jewish Congress. Asked whether Finkelstein's analysis might play into the hands of neo-Nazis for antisemitic purposes, Hilberg replied, "Well, even if they do use it in that fashion, I'm afraid that when it comes to the truth, it has to be said openly, without regard to any consequences that would be undesirable, embarrassing".

In a review in the journal Historical Materialism, Enzo Traverso called the book "polemical and violent" but also "in many ways appropriate and convincing". Traverso expressed many reservations about Finkelstein's arguments about the Swiss banks and the reaction in Europe. Traverso agreed (with Hilberg) that the allegations Finkelstein made against a number of Jewish American institutions are probably correct. He also referred to the favorable reception Finkelstein's book received in the Frankfurter Allgemeine Zeitung, calling it "welcome hyberbole". But Traverso criticized Finkelstein for ignoring the European aspect of the matter, and said Finkelstein's analysis was too simplistic and crudely materialistic. He concluded, "Finkelstein's book contains a core of truth that must be recognised, but it lends itself, due to its style and several of its main arguments, to the worst uses and instrumentalisations".

The historian David Cesarani criticized Finkelstein for absolving Swiss banks of serious misconduct toward Holocaust survivors and for depicting the banks as victims of Jewish terror. Cesarani said that Finkelstein based his claim on a single sentence from an annex to a report that related to some specific issues, while ignoring the report's main conclusions, which "fully justified the campaign [against the Swiss banks] that was necessary to wrest compensation from initially unapologetic and obdurate Swiss banks".

=== Criticism of Alan Dershowitz's The Case for Israel ===
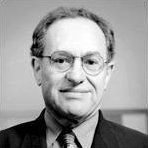
Finkelstein's public feud with jurist and academic Alan Dershowitz lasted for years and had a negative effect on Finkelstein's academic career.

Shortly after the 2003 publication of Alan Dershowitz's book The Case for Israel, Finkelstein derided it as "a collection of fraud, falsification, plagiarism, and nonsense". During a debate on Democracy Now!, Finkelstein said that Dershowitz lacked knowledge of specific contents of his own book. He also claimed that Dershowitz did not write the book and might not have even read it.

Finkelstein said there were 20 instances, in as many pages, where Dershowitz's book cites the same sources and passages Joan Peters used in her book, in largely the same sequence, with ellipses in the same places. In two instances, Dershowitz reproduces Peters's errors. From this Finkelstein concluded that Dershowitz had not checked the original sources himself, contrary to his claims. Finkelstein suggested that this copying of quotations amounted to copying ideas. Examining a copy of a proof of Dershowitz's book he managed to obtain, he found evidence that Dershowitz had his secretarial assistant, Holly Beth Billington, check in the Harvard library the sources he had read in Peters's book. Dershowitz answered the charge in a letter to the University of California's Press Director Lynne Withey, arguing that Finkelstein had made up the smoking gun quotation by changing its wording (from "cite" to "copy") in his book. In public debate, he said that if "somebody borrowed the quote without going to check back on whether Mark Twain had said that, obviously that would be a serious charge", but said that he did not do that and had indeed checked the original source.

Dershowitz threatened libel action over the charges in Finkelstein's book, as a consequence of which the publisher deleted the word "plagiarism" from the text before publication. Finkelstein agreed to remove the suggestion that Dershowitz was not the true author of The Case for Israel because, as the publisher said, "he couldn't document that".

Asserting that he did consult the original sources, Dershowitz said Finkelstein was simply accusing him of good scholarly practice: citing references he learned of initially from Peters's book. Dershowitz denied that he used any of Peters's ideas without citation. "Plagiarism is taking someone else's words and claiming they're your own. There are no borrowed words from anybody. There are no borrowed ideas from anybody because I fundamentally disagree with the conclusions of Peters's book." In a footnote in The Case for Israel that cites Peters's book, Dershowitz explicitly denies that he "relies" on Peters for "conclusions or data".

In their joint interview on Democracy Now, Finkelstein cited specific passages in Dershowitz's book in which a phrase that he said Peters coined was incorrectly attributed to George Orwell:

[Peters] coins the phrase "turnspeak"; she says she's using it as a play off of George Orwell, which as all listeners know used the phrase "Newspeak." She coined her own phrase, "turnspeak". You go to Mr. Dershowitz's book, he got so confused in his massive borrowings from Joan Peters that on two occasions—I'll cite them for those who have a copy of the book, on page 57 and on page 153—he uses the phrase "George Orwell's 'turnspeak'." "Turnspeak" is not Orwell, Mr. Dershowitz".

James O. Freedman, the former president of Dartmouth College, the University of Iowa, and the American Academy of Arts and Sciences, defended Dershowitz:

I do not understand [Finkelstein's] charge of plagiarism against Alan Dershowitz. There is no claim that Dershowitz used the words of others without attribution. When he uses the words of others, he quotes them properly and generally cites them to the original sources (Mark Twain, Palestine Royal Commission, etc.) [Finkelstein's] complaint is that instead he should have cited them to the secondary source, in which Dershowitz may have come upon them. But as The Chicago Manual of Style emphasizes: 'Importance of attribution. With all reuse of others' materials, it is important to identify the original as the source. This not only bolsters the claims of fair use, it also helps avoid any accusation of plagiarism.' This is precisely what Dershowitz did.

Responding to an article in The Nation by Alexander Cockburn, Dershowitz also cited The Chicago Manual of Style:

Cockburn's claim is that some of the quotes should not have been cited to their original sources but rather to a secondary source, where he believes I stumbled upon them. Even if he were correct that I found all these quotations in Peters's book, the preferred method of citation is to the original source, as The Chicago Manual of Style emphasizes: "With all reuse of others' materials, it is important to identify the original as the source. This...helps avoid any accusation of plagiarism ... To cite a source from a secondary source ('quoted in...') is generally to be discouraged"

Cockburn responded:

Quoting The Chicago Manual of Style, Dershowitz artfully implies that he followed the rules by citing "the original" as opposed to the secondary source, Peters. He misrepresents Chicago here, where "the original" means merely the origin of the borrowed material, which is, in this instance, Peters.

Now look at the second bit of the quote from Chicago, chastely separated from the preceding sentence by a demure three-point ellipsis. As my associate Kate Levin has discovered, this passage ("To cite a source from a secondary source...") occurs on page 727, which is no less than 590 pages later than the material before the ellipsis, in a section titled "Citations Taken from Secondary Sources." Here's the full quote, with what Dershowitz left out set in bold: "'Quoted in'. To cite a source from a secondary source ("quoted in") is generally to be discouraged, since authors are expected to have examined the works they cite. If an original source is unavailable, however, both the original and the secondary source must be listed."

So Chicago is clearly insisting that unless Dershowitz went to the originals, he was obliged to cite Peters. Finkelstein has conclusively demonstrated that he didn't go to the originals. Plagiarism, QED, plus added time for willful distortion of the language of Chicago's guidelines, cobbling together two separate discussions.

On Dershowitz's behalf, Harvard Law School dean Elena Kagan asked former Harvard president Derek Bok to investigate the assertion of plagiarism; Bok exonerated Dershowitz of the charge.

In April 2007, Frank Menetrez, a former Editor-in-Chief of the UCLA Law Review, published an analysis of the charges Dershowitz made against Finkelstein and concluded that Dershowitz had misrepresented matters. In a follow-up analysis he concluded that he could find "no way of avoiding the inference that Dershowitz copied the quotation from Twain from Peters's From Time Immemorial, and not from the original source", as Dershowitz claimed.

== Controversies ==
=== Tenure rejection and resignation ===
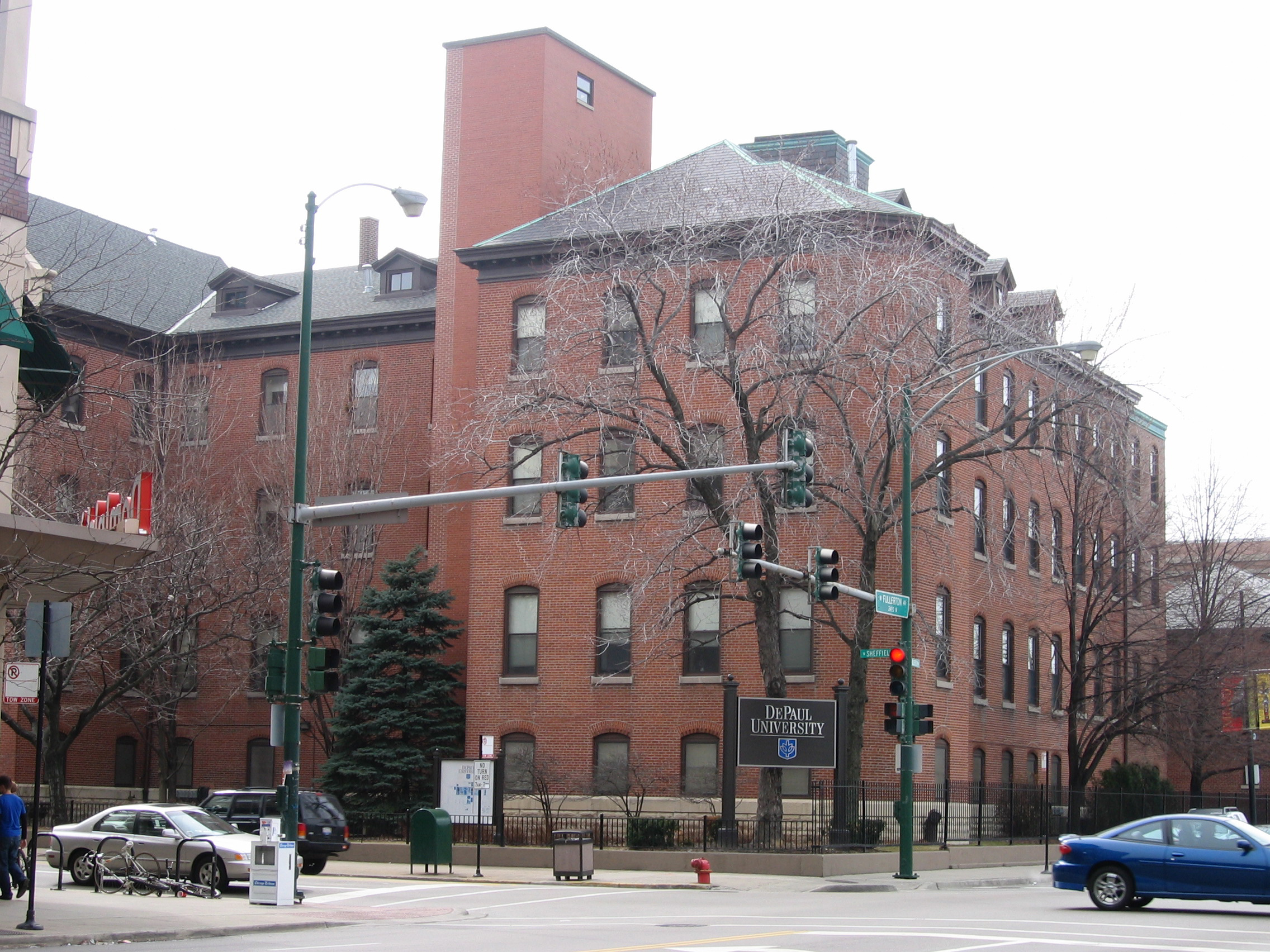
Finkelstein's tenure at DePaul University, Chicago, ended with a vote against granting him tenure. Weeks of protests ensued on campus in support of granting him a position at the university.

Amid considerable public debate, Alan Dershowitz campaigned to block Finkelstein's tenure bid at DePaul University. His campaign began in 2004 when he sent DePaul president Dennis Holtschneider a manuscript, "Literary McCarthyism," arguing that the university should fire Finkelstein. He also contacted DePaul political science department chair Patrick Callahan. In 2005, Dershowitz announced his intent to block Finkelstein's tenure bid, saying, "I will come at my own expense, and I will document the case against Finkelstein" and "I'll demonstrate that he doesn't meet the academic standards of the Association of American Universities". In October 2006, he sent members of DePaul's law and political science faculties what he called "a dossier of Norman Finkelstein's most egregious academic sins, and especially his outright lies, misquotations, and distortions" and lobbied DePaul's professors, alumni and administrators to deny Finkelstein tenure. In May 2007, Dershowitz spoke at Northwestern University and claimed that Finkelstein had recently attended a Holocaust denial conference in Iran.

DePaul's political science committee investigated Dershowitz's accusations against Finkelstein and concluded that they were unsubstantiated. The department subsequently invited John Mearsheimer and Ian Lustick, two previously uninvolved academics with expertise on the Israel–Palestinian conflict, to evaluate the academic merit of Finkelstein's work; they came to the same conclusion.

In early 2007, DePaul's political science department voted nine to three, and the College of Liberal Arts and Sciences Personnel Committee five to zero, to give Finkelstein tenure. The three opposing faculty members subsequently filed a minority report opposing tenure, supported by the Dean of the College, Chuck Suchar. In leaked memos, Suchar wrote that he opposed tenure because "the personal attacks in many of Dr. Finkelstein's published books ... border on character assassination" and his attitudes threatened "some basic tenets of discourse within an academic community". He believed they were inconsistent with DePaul's "Vincentian" values. As examples, Suchar said that Finkelstein lacked respect for "the dignity of the individual" and for "the rights of others to hold and express different intellectual positions". In June 2007, DePaul University's Board on Promotion and Tenure, with the support of Holtschneider, denied Finkelstein tenure by a 4–3 vote.

The university denied that Dershowitz's lobbying played a part in its decision. At the same time, the university denied tenure to international studies assistant professor Mehrene Larudee, a strong supporter of Finkelstein and Jewish Voice for Peace member, despite unanimous support from her department, the Personnel Committee and the dean. Finkelstein said that he would engage in civil disobedience if attempts were made to bar him from teaching his students.

The Faculty Council later affirmed the professors' right to appeal, which a university lawyer said was not possible. Council President Anne Bartlett said she was "terribly concerned" that a correct procedure had not been followed. DePaul's faculty association considered taking no-confidence votes on administrators, including Holtschneider, because of the tenure denials.

In June 2007, after two weeks of protests, some DePaul students staged a sit-in and hunger strike in support of both professors. The Illinois Conference of the American Association of University Professors also sent Holtschneider a letter reading, "It is entirely illegitimate for a university to deny tenure to a professor out of fear that his published research ... might hurt a college's reputation" and that the association has "explicitly rejected collegiality as an appropriate criterion for evaluating faculty members".

In a statement issued upon Finkelstein's resignation in September 2007, DePaul called him "a prolific scholar and an outstanding teacher". Dershowitz found the compromise and statement objectionable, saying that DePaul had "traded truth for peace" and that the claim Finkelstein "is a scholar is simply false. He's a propagandist". In a 2014 interview, Matthew Abraham, author of Out of Bounds: Academic Freedom and the Question of Palestine, called Finkelstein's tenure case "one of the most significant academic freedom cases in the last fifty years" and said it demonstrated "the substantial pressure outside parties can place on a mid-tier religious institution when the perspectives advanced by a controversial scholar threaten dominant interests".

=== Denied entry to Israel in 2008 ===
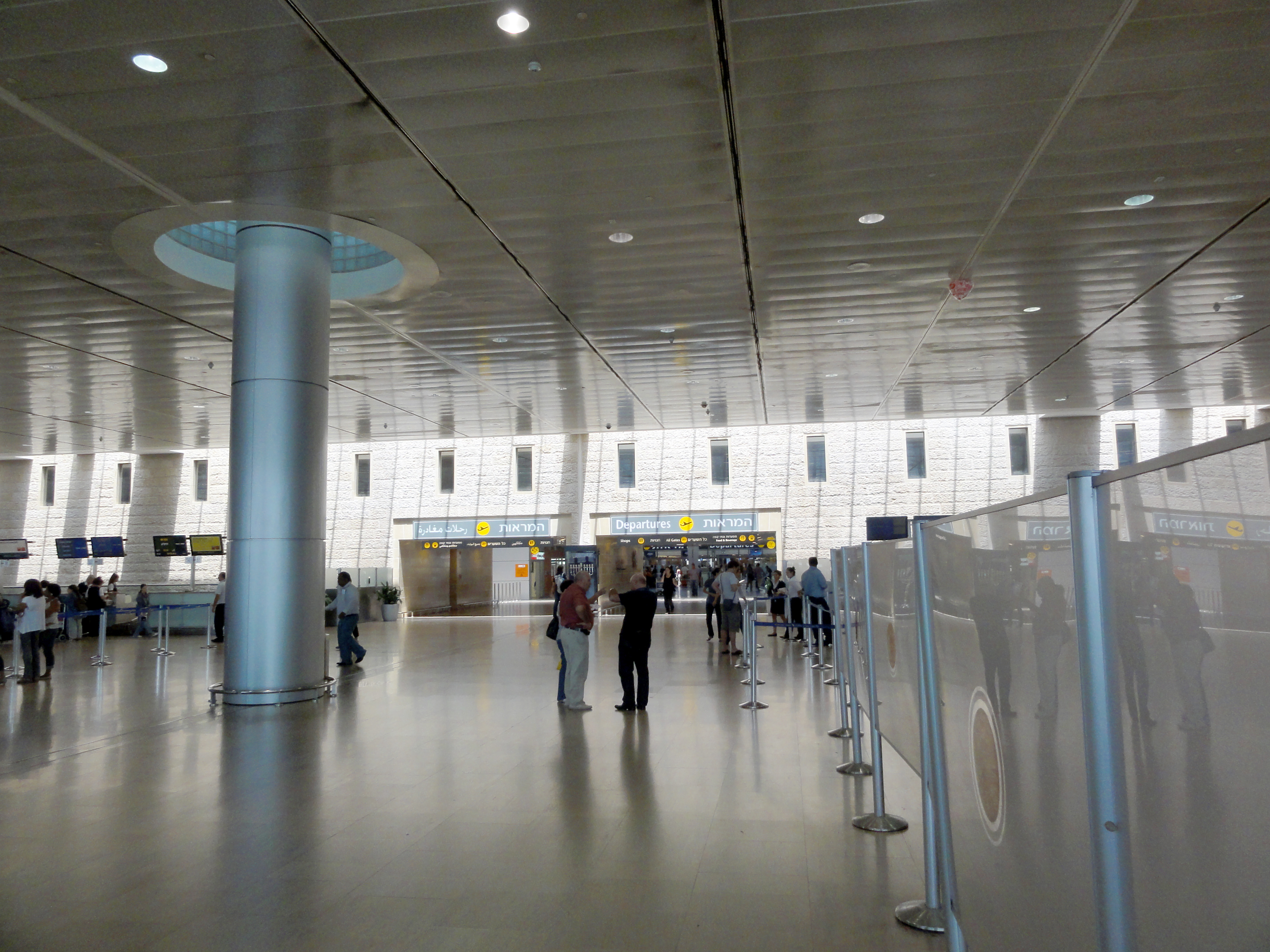
Terminal 3 of Ben Gurion International Airport. Attempting to enter Israel in 2008, Finkelstein was detained at that airport for 24 hours and then deported.

In May 2008, Finkelstein was denied entry to Israel, according to unnamed Shin Bet security officials, because "of suspicions involving hostile elements in Lebanon" and because he "did not give a full accounting to interrogators with regard to these suspicions." Finkelstein had visited south Lebanon and met with Lebanese families during the 2006 Lebanon War. He was banned from entering Israel for 10 years.

Finkelstein was questioned after his arrival at Ben Gurion Airport near Tel Aviv and detained for 24 hours in a holding cell. His Israeli attorney Michael Sfard said he was questioned for several hours. The following day, he was deported on a flight to Amsterdam, his point of origin. In an interview with Haaretz, Finkelstein said, "I did my best to provide absolutely candid and comprehensive answers to all the questions put to me. I am confident that I have nothing to hide... no suicide missions or secret rendezvous with terrorist organizations." He had been traveling to visit friends in the West Bank and said he had no interest in visiting Israel.

== Reception ==
Many of Finkelstein's books critically examine other authors' books. Authors of books he has criticized include Dershowitz, Daniel Jonah Goldhagen, and Benny Morris. They have in turn accused Finkelstein of grossly misrepresenting their work and quoting their books selectively. In 2007, Morris said, "Finkelstein is a notorious distorter of facts and of my work, not a serious or honest historian."

Hilberg has praised Finkelstein's work: "That takes a great amount of courage. His place in the whole history of writing history is assured, and that those who in the end are proven right triumph, and he will be among those who will have triumphed, albeit, it so seems, at great cost." In a peer review for Beyond Chutzpah, Avi Shlaim said that Finkelstein "has a most impressive track record in exposing spurious American-Jewish scholarship on the Arab-Israeli conflict." He praised Finkelstein for "all the sterling qualities for which he has become famous: erudition, originality, spark, meticulous attention to detail, intellectual integrity, courage, and formidable forensic skills."

Sara Roy said that her shared experience with Finkelstein as a child of Holocaust survivors engaged in research on the Palestinian-Israeli conflict gave her a unique position to comment. According to Roy, Finkelstein's scholarship is "exceptional both for its brilliance and rigor. In the fields of Middle Eastern studies and political science his work is considered seminal and there is no doubt that both disciplines would be intellectually weaker without it. Norman's power and value, however, do not emanate only from his scholarship but from his character. His life's work, shaped largely but not entirely by his experience as a child of survivors, has been and continues to be informed by a profound concern with human dignity and the danger of dehumanization."

The Israeli newspaper Haaretz published an editorial that states it "is difficult to sympathize with Finkelstein's opinions and preferences, especially since he decided to support Hezbollah, meet with its fighters and visit the graves of some of its slain operatives." Still, it argued that he should not be banned from entering Israel, because "meetings with Hezbollah operatives do not in themselves constitute a security risk".

In The Jewish Chronicle, Lee Harpin called Finkelstein an "anti-Israel activist".

=== Criticism ===
Finkelstein has been heavily criticized for many aspects of his work and public commentary. Daniel Goldhagen, whose book Hitler's Willing Executioners Finkelstein criticized, claimed his scholarship has "everything to do with his burning political agenda". According to Gavriel D. Rosenfeld in Contemporary European History,

The accusation that Goldhagen was a Zionist ideologue surfaced in two extremely critical essays by Norman Finkelstein which, while offering substantive criticisms of Goldhagen's work, concluded with wildly polemical and unfair speculations Goldhagen's putative role as the chief representative of the (allegedly) politically driven and scholarly worthless field of "Holocaust studies". Revealingly, Finkelstein declined to identify any representatives of this scholarly field, leaving one little choice but to regard it as a straw man argument, perfectly suited for him to topple as a means of promoting his own political agenda.

Peter Novick, a history professor at the University of Chicago and historian of the Holocaust whose work Finkelstein said inspired The Holocaust Industry, has strongly criticized Finkelstein's work, calling it "trash" and "a twenty-first century updating of the Protocols of the Elders of Zion". He added, "No facts alleged by Finkelstein should be assumed to be really facts, no quotation in his book should be assumed to be accurate, without taking the time to carefully compare his claims with the sources he cites".

David Cesarani wrote of The Holocaust Industry: "Selective quotation such as Finkelstein's and other misuse of evidence undermine the credibility of his polemic. Any serious points it raises, and there are a few, are distorted by a venomous dislike of the 'American Jewish elites'. Memory of the Holocaust has been abused and misused, but this book is part of the problem rather than its cure".

Similarly, Alan Dershowitz, whose book The Case for Israel and Finkelstein's response Beyond Chutzpah sparked an ongoing feud between the two, has claimed Finkelstein is complicit in a conspiracy against pro-Israel scholars: "The mode of attack is consistent. Chomsky selects the target and directs Finkelstein to probe the writings in minute detail and conclude that the writer didn't actually write the work, that it is plagiarized, that it is a hoax and a fraud". Dershowitz added that Finkelstein has leveled charges against many academics, calling at least 10 "distinguished Jews 'hucksters', 'hoaxters', 'thieves', 'extortionists', and worse". The feud between Finkelstein and Dershowitz received the most attention in the controversy, but Finkelstein has said that "the real issue is Israel's human rights record".

Israeli historian Omer Bartov, writing for The New York Times Book Review, judged The Holocaust Industry to be marred by the same errors Finkelstein denounces in those who exploit the Holocaust for profit or politics:

It is filled with precisely the kind of shrill hyperbole that Finkelstein rightly deplores in much of the current media hype over the Holocaust; it is brimming with the same indifference to historical facts, inner contradictions, strident politics and dubious contextualizations; and it oozes with the same smug sense of moral and intellectual superiority... Like any conspiracy theory, it contains several grains of truth; and like any such theory, it is both irrational and insidious.

Finkelstein has accused journalist Jeffrey Goldberg of "torturing" or "being an accessory to torture of" Palestinian prisoners during his IDF service in the First Intifada, based on statements in Goldberg's book Prisoners. Finkelstein says Goldberg admits to personally sending prisoners to the zinzana, which he says has been repeatedly condemned as torture in human rights reports. Goldberg called the allegation "ridiculous" and said he had "never laid a hand on anybody". Goldberg said his "principal role" was "making sure prisoners had fresh fruit". He called Finkelstein a "ridiculous figure" and accused him of "lying and purposely misreading my book".

=== Documentaries ===
American Radical: The Trials of Norman Finkelstein is a documentary film about Finkelstein's life and career, released in 2009, and directed by David Ridgen and Nicolas Rossier. It has an approval rating of 100% on review aggregator Rotten Tomatoes, based on 11 critic reviews.

The same year, Finkelstein also appeared in Defamation (Hebrew: השמצה), a documentary by Israeli filmmaker Yoav Shamir.

=== Harassment and threats ===
Because of his outspoken criticism of Israel, Finkelstein has received death threats and harassment. In February 2025, he was harassed by the right-wing Zionist group Betar. While he was on the street, some members of the group gave him pagers, as a reference to the 2024 pager attacks in Lebanon.

== Views on the Israeli–Palestinian conflict ==
=== Comments about Israel ===
Interview of Norman Finkelstein on This Week In Palestine radio

Finkelstein is a sharp critic of the state of Israel, which he has called the "Jewish supremacist state" and believes is committing the crime of apartheid against Palestinians. Discussing his book Beyond Chutzpah, Israeli historian Avi Shlaim called Finkelstein's critique of Israel "extremely detailed, well-documented and accurate."

In a 2009 telephone interview with Today's Zaman, Finkelstein said:

I think Israel, as a number of commentators pointed out, is becoming an insane state. And we have to be honest about that. While the rest of the world wants peace, Europe wants peace, the US wants peace, but this state wants war, war and war. In the first week of the massacres, there were reports in the Israeli press that Israel did not want to put all its ground forces in Gaza because it was preparing attacks on Iran. Then there were reports it was planning attacks on Lebanon. It is a lunatic state.

When asked how he, as the son of Holocaust survivors, felt about Israel's operation in Gaza, Finkelstein replied:

It has been a long time since I felt any emotional connection with the state of Israel, which relentlessly and brutally and inhumanly keeps these vicious, murderous wars. It is a vandal state. There is a Russian writer who once described vandal states as Genghis Khan with a telegraph. Israel is Genghis Khan with a computer. I feel no emotion of affinity with that state. I have some good friends and their families there, and of course I would not want any of them to be hurt. That said, sometimes I feel that Israel has come out of the boils of the [sic] hell, a satanic state.

Finkelstein believes that the main reason the conflict isn't resolved is "the refusal of Israel, backed by the United States government, to abide by international law, to abide by the opinion of the international community."

=== Terrorism and targeting civilians ===
In an interview with Emanuel Stoakes, Finkelstein answered the question "Do you unequivocally condemn Palestinian attacks against innocent civilians?" as follows:

It is impossible to justify terrorism, which is the targeting of civilians to achieve a political goal. But it's also difficult to make categorical statements of the kind you suggest. I do believe that Hezbollah has the right to target Israeli civilians if Israel persists in targeting civilians until Israel ceases its terrorist acts.

Finkelstein has said that Hamas and Hezbollah have the right to defend their countries from what he sees as Israeli aggression, and that both Israel and Hamas are guilty of targeting civilians. Israel, he claims, indiscriminately kills Palestinians, which he says is the same thing as targeting civilians. There is an equivalence between these groups and Israel, he argues: "If Hezbollah is a terrorist organization, if you want to make that claim, I won't argue with you so long as you say further that Israel is a terrorist organization by probably, at least, 25-fold greater."

After the October 7 attacks, Finkelstein wrote:

For the past 20 years the people of Gaza, half of whom are children, have been immured in a concentration camp. Today they breached the camp's walls. If we honor John Brown's armed resistance to slavery; if we honor the Jews who revolted in the Warsaw Ghetto—then moral consistency commands that we honor the heroic resistance in Gaza. I, for one, will never begrudge—on the contrary, it warms every fiber of my soul—the scenes of Gaza's smiling children as their arrogant Jewish supremacist oppressors have, finally, been humbled. The stars above in heaven are looking kindly down. Glory, glory, hallelujah. The souls of Gaza go marching on!

Finkelstein later explained that this reaction was based on initial reports that only 50 Israelis had been killed in the attack.

=== Hezbollah and Hamas ===
Finkelstein has expressed solidarity with Hezbollah with respect to defensive actions.

I was of course happy to meet the Hezbollah people, because it is a point of view that is rarely heard in the United States. I have no problem saying that I do want to express solidarity with them, and I am not going to be a coward and a hypocrite about it.

He has said that Hezbollah has "a serious leadership whose commitment is matched by its intelligence and its incorruptibility" and expressed admiration for its Secretary General Hassan Nasrallah. He believes that the 2006 Israel–Hezbollah War demonstrated how to defeat Israel using guerilla warfare. Hezbollah militants' superior discipline gives them an edge against Israel's army, Finkelstein argues:

Israel is, for better or for worse, it's a Westernized society and they don't have… they're interested in hi-tech, they're interested in a good time, they cannot fight and win against the types who embody Hezbollah values. It's just not going to happen. When they described in the newspapers how Hezbollah organizes, they said this is not an organization that you can knock on the door, can I join? No. They start from a quite young age and they learn discipline. What does discipline mean? They tell a fellow, you go over there in that barn and you wait there until we call you. And sometimes they sit in that barn for 2, 3 and 4 days, waiting to be called and until they're called, they don't leave. You know, most people in the West can't do that.

Finkelstein argues that one of Israel's primary motives for the 2008 offensive in Gaza was that Hamas was "signaling that it wanted a diplomatic settlement of the conflict along the June 1967 border." He believes Hamas has joined the international community in "seeking a diplomatic settlement" and has called Hamas's stance toward Israel before the war a "peace offensive".

=== One-state solution, two-state solution, and the Palestinian refugees ===
Finkelstein has said he believes that the Palestine solidarity movement should focus on a pragmatic settlement of the Israeli–Palestinian conflict rather than a just one. In his view, the two-state solution is the pragmatic option and the one-state solution the idealistic one. He claims that the two-state solution is deeply unjust to the Palestinians:

Of course the two-state solution is unjust. It cements Zionist usurpation of Palestinian land. It lets the perpetrators of this usurpation go scot-free, without so much as compensation for their victims. Worst of all, it perpetuates a state based on racial supremacy. Israel’s notion of Jewishness, the determinant of who should hold sovereignty, is ultimately a biological [sic]. It is based on kinship. In practice, this kinship does not, as in other countries, depend on tracing family lines back to residence in the sovereign state, but simply on closeness to anyone considered "Jewish" in the racial sense of the term.

According to Finkelstein, the two-state solution is achievable, and the one-state solution is not. His view of the one-state solution is "a society in which Jews and Palestinians enjoy the same democratic rights. One Jew, one vote, one Palestinian, one vote." This, he argues, is a society Israeli Jews will never acquiesce to because Jewish dominance cannot be guaranteed. He argues that it would be tantamount to Israel giving up "its existence, its rationale, and the security of all its Jewish citizens". He similarly argues that the Palestinian refugees who were forced to leave their homes in the 1948 war, whom Israel prevents from returning, have the right of return to what is now Israel. But he believes that insisting on that right is unrealistic and doubts international public support could be found for it:

Israel has a population of 8.3 million people. Of those 8.3 million, about 6 million are Jewish. The number of Palestinian refugees is about 6 million. Is it realistic to expect that international public opinion at the popular or State level will demand that Israel open its borders such that the number of Palestinians entering the country would be equal to the current Israeli-Jewish population? ... I don’t believe that's a realistic expectation.

Finkelstein further argues that even if a binational state comes into existence, there is no guarantee of an absence of bloodshed. He cites Lebanon as the closest analogue and points to the dissolutions of Czechoslovakia and Yugoslavia (as well as tensions within Belgium) as examples of how binational states have tended to fracture.

For these reasons, Finkelstein prefers the two-state solution. He believes that, while such a solution is currently politically impossible, it could come to fruition through mutually agreed land swaps and by evacuating about half of all Israeli settlers in the West Bank:

Topographers and cartographers on both the Israeli and Palestinian sides say there is a way to retain a contiguous Palestinian state with land swaps so that the total area remains the same as the 1967 borders, while enabling around 60 percent of the illegal Jewish settlers to remain in place under Israeli rule. ... But it’s feasible.

Finkelstein argues that many Israeli Jews see the ongoing occupation and the West Bank settlements as problematic; that they benefit only a small segment of Israel's Jews; that they complicate security arrangements; that the occupation is expensive; and that it earns Israel near-universal opprobrium. Thus, he argues, Israel could be compelled to accept a two-state solution. The Palestinian right of return would not necessarily be relinquished if a two-state solution was implemented, but according to Finkelstein, the Palestinians could still impose it on Israel if they became powerful enough.

=== The BDS movement ===
Finkelstein's opinions on the one-state solution and the right of return lay the foundation for his critique of the Boycott, Divestment and Sanctions (BDS) movement. BDS's demands include an end to the occupation and the removal of the West Bank barrier, full equality for Arab-Palestinian citizens of Israel; and "respecting, protecting, and promoting the rights of Palestinian refugees to return to their homes and properties". It advocates international boycotts, divestment and sanctions against Israel to achieve these goals. Finkelstein believes that BDS's tactics are correct but not its demands. BDS has no official position on either the one-state or two-state solutions, which he finds dishonest, because in his view, BDS's demands would eliminate Israel: "If we end the occupation and bring back six million Palestinians and we have equal rights for Arabs and Jews, there's no Israel."

BDS claims that its demands are anchored in international law. Finkelstein disputes this because the international community recognizes Israel. Therefore, because he believes that BDS's demands would lead to the end of Israel, international law does not support them. He also believes that there is a "limit of the spectrum of progressive thought in the world we live" and that BDS's demands exceed that limit. He argues that BDS is a "cult" that cannot reach the general public: "if you want to go past that law or ignore the Israel part, you'll never reach a broad public. And then it's a cult."

BDS claims to enjoy broad support in Palestinian civil society. Finkelstein claims that is a lie:

I'm not going to be in a cult again. I'm not going through that stage again, with the gurus in Ramallah, you know, giving out marching orders. And then if you disagree, they say, "10,556,454 Palestinian civil society organizations have endorsed this." Who are these organizations? They're NGOs in Ramallah, one-person operations, and they claim to represent what they call this thing, "Palestinian civil society." ... [T]hen why can't they ever organize a demonstration of more than 500 people? ... [They] represent absolutely nothing.

Finkelstein believes that BDS serves the role as "a new Great Satan" to the Israeli government, an external threat "bent on Israel's destruction" to rally around. In his view, international public opinion has begun to turn against Israel but BDS allows it "to play victim." He believes that by inflating the threat of BDS, the Israeli government delegitimizes other critics of Israel:

By inflating the threat posed by BDS; and by redefining BDS to encompass all opposition to it, including European Union and church initiatives wholly divorced from BDS; and by subsuming under the rubric of BDS the campaigns in the West that only targeted the settlements and the occupation—by exaggerating the reach and potency of BDS, Israel could delegitimize even its most tepid but also most ominous critics. It could now allege that even they were really, whatever they might avow, seeking Israel's destruction.

Finkelstein contends that BDS has allowed Israel to "play the victim card" and shift the debate from pressing human rights concerns, such as the ongoing blockade of Gaza, to the question of whether BDS is antisemitic. He believes that BDS has helped Israel in this effort: "But it must also be said that BDS made it very easy for Israel, by refusing to recognize its legality as a state within the pre-June 1967 borders."

Finkelstein's criticism of BDS has put him on a collision course with other voices in the Palestinian solidarity movement who support it. He suspects that his public criticism has caused him to be locked out of the pro-Palestinian debating circuit; in 2016, he said:

A month ago, Mehdi Hasan's program Up Front contacted me. They wanted me to join a debate on BDS. But the BDS leaders refused to appear on the program. It's happened more times than I care to remember. One BDS leader told Democracy Now!, "Why debate Finkelstein? He's not important. We should debate important people." I used to give 40 talks a year. Now I give maybe four. I know the number because of those 1099 slips I have to submit to my accountant. Three years ago, before the BDS thing exploded, I gave him 40 slips. Last year I gave him four.

Ali Abunimah has written an article criticizing Finkelstein's arguments.

=== Weaponization of antisemitism ===
In one scene of American Radical, filmed at Waterloo University, Finkelstein takes exception to a German student's teary complaint about how he talks about the Nazis and the Holocaust, saying:

I don't like to play before an audience the Holocaust card but, since now I feel compelled to: my late father was in Auschwitz concentration camp. My late mother was in Majdanek concentration camp. Every single member of my family on both sides was exterminated. Both of my parents were in the Warsaw Ghetto Uprising. And it is precisely and exactly because of the lessons my parents taught me and my two siblings that I will not be silent when Israel commits its crimes against the Palestinians. And I consider nothing more despicable than to use their suffering and their martyrdom to try to justify the torture, the brutalization, the demolition of homes that Israel daily commits against the Palestinians. So I refuse any longer to be intimidated or browbeaten by the tears. If you had any heart in you, you would be crying for the Palestinians.

Julia Rock of The Drift wrote that Finkelstein "has long been suspicious of the role that victimhood has played in American Jewish identity formation". In the 2009 documentary Defamation, Finkelstein asked, "So many people are suffering, and you want me to get excited about some idiot painting a swastika somewhere?"

In 2024, Finkelstein was criticized after he wrote on Twitter that "the Jewish billionaire class" had launched "the most concerted assault on academic freedom in the history of our country", with former Bernie Sanders advisor Matt Duss calling the tweet antisemitic. Finkelstein said that Israeli media outlets had used similar phrases. He said that U.S. billionaires are disproportionately Jewish, and "With money comes power. I know this is a shock to politically correct people".

== Other statements ==
=== On Holocaust denial ===
In October 2020, Finkelstein published an extract from his forthcoming book, Cancel Culture, Academic Freedom and Me on his website following the banning of Holocaust denial from Facebook and Twitter. According to Finkelstein, "Holocaust denial should be taught in university and preferably by a Holocaust denier" as a means "to inoculate students" against it. He states: "If one is committed to the purity of truth, not just in its wholeness but also in its parts, then a Holocaust denier performs the useful function of ferreting out 'local' errors, precisely because he is a devil's advocate—that is, fanatically committed to 'unmasking' the 'hoax of the 20th century.'"

=== Ukraine-Russia war ===
Finkelstein called Russia's 2022 invasion of Ukraine a legitimate response under international law to NATO's provocations.

=== Wokeism ===
In May 2023, on Glenn Loury's podcast The Glenn Show, Finkelstein called wokeness a "lucrative scam" and "intellectually worthless", criticizing Ibram X. Kendi's and Angela Davis's speaking engagements as "rich white folks using woke people as protective cover".

In an interview with Imran Garda, Finkelstein expanded on this:

I didn't have a problem with it, it seemed to be another "college fad"... but then it became painfully obvious that it was politically a very pernicious phenomenon... the big difference between political correctness and woke politics is political correctness was really marginal, a few campus radicals, but the Democratic Party has instrumentalized identity politics to displace what was once its base, namely the trade union movement... identity politics has infiltrated most of what you would call liberal culture and so its impact, the dangers it poses are much more significant... identity politics has appropriated those causes, the women's question, the African-American question, but lopped off the class element.

In his 2023 book I'll Burn That Bridge When I Get to It, Finkelstein reiterates these criticisms, arguing that identity politics distracts from class issues.

Julia Rock of The Drift wrote that, while Finkelstein supported transgender people having the same rights as others, his criticism of the transgender rights movement had alienated many younger progressives. In a 2023 Substack article, Finkelstein wrote that the "woke world" had a "perverse and perverted fetish of transgender persons" and called gender-reassignment surgery "genital mutilation". In I'll Burn That Bridge When I Get to It!, Finkelstein writes that the "snooty, self-indulgent, virtue-signaling Harvard-Hamptons-Hollywood crowd" supports transgender rights disingenuously for political gain. Addressing this alleged group, he said, "I’ll tell you my pronouns if you tell me your net worth."

== Books ==
- 1987: From the Jewish Question to the Jewish State: An Essay on the Theory of Zionism (thesis), Princeton University.
- 1995: Image and Reality of the Israel-Palestine Conflict, Verso; ISBN 1-85984-442-1
- 1996: The Rise and Fall of Palestine: A Personal Account of the Intifada Years. Minneapolis: U of Minnesota Press, ISBN 0-8166-2859-9.
- 1998: A Nation on Trial: The Goldhagen Thesis and Historical Truth (co-written with Ruth Bettina Birn), Henry Holt and Co.; ISBN 0-8050-5872-9.
- 2000: The Holocaust Industry: Reflections on the Exploitation of Jewish Suffering, Verso; ISBN 1-85984-488-X.
- 2005: Beyond Chutzpah: On the Misuse of Anti-Semitism and the Abuse of History. University of California Press: Berkeley, 2005. ISBN 978-0-520-24989-9
- 2007: Dennis Ross and the Peace Process: Subordinating Palestinian Rights to Israeli "needs", Institute for Palestine Studies, Washington, D.C. ISBN 978-0-88728-308-6
- 2010: This Time We Went Too Far: Truth and Consequences of the Gaza Invasion. OR Books, New York: 2010. ISBN 978-1-935928-43-0
- 2011: Goldstone Recants. Richard Goldstone renews Israel's license to kill, OR Books, New York (2011), ISBN 978-1-935928-51-5
- 2012: Knowing Too Much: Why the American Jewish Romance with Israel is Coming to an End, OR Books, New York (2012) ISBN 978-1-935928-77-5
- 2012: What Gandhi Says About Nonviolence, Resistance and Courage, OR Books, New York: 2012, ISBN 978-1-935928-79-9
- 2014: Method and Madness: The Hidden Story of Israel's Assaults on Gaza, OR Books, New York (2014), ISBN 978-1-939293-71-8
- 2014: Old Wine, Broken Bottle: Ari Shavit's Promised Land, OR Books, New York (2014), ISBN 978-1-939293-46-6
- 2018: Gaza: An Inquest Into Its Martyrdom, University of California Press, Oakland, California, January 2018, ISBN 9780520295711
- 2019: I Accuse!: Herewith A Proof Beyond Reasonable Doubt That ICC Chief Prosecutor Fatou Bensouda Whitewashed Israel, OR Books, New York (2019), ISBN 9781682192276
- 2022: I'll Burn That Bridge When I Get to It, Sublation Media, Portland, ISBN 979-8-9867884-2-5
- 2026: Gaza's Gravediggers: An Inquiry Into Corruption in High Places, OR Books, New York, ISBN 1682196577

== See also ==
- American Radical: The Trials of Norman Finkelstein 2009 documentary
- Holocaust survivors and descendants supporting Palestine
- Hedy Epstein - a pro-Palestine Holocaust survivor
- Gabor Maté - another pro-Palestine Holocaust survivor
