= Gaza: An Inquest into Its Martyrdom =

2018 book by Norman Finkelstein

- Author: Norman Finkelstein
- Language: English
- Subject: Gaza Strip
- Publisher: University of California Press
- Publication date: January 2018
- Publication place: United States
- Pages: 440
- ISBN: 978-0-520-29571-1

Gaza: An Inquest into Its Martyrdom is a book about the Gaza Strip by the American political scientist and activist Norman Finkelstein. It was published in 2018 by the University of California Press.

== Summary ==
The preface of the book begins with:

This book is not about Gaza. It is about what has been done to Gaza. It is fashionable nowadays to speak of a victim’s agency. But one must be realistic about the constraints imposed on such agency by objective circumstance.

The book briefly covers basic historical background leading to the political and economic situation in Gaza today. Finkelstein describes Israeli policies towards the occupied territories and the role those policies played in the peace process. The title of the second chapter is "Deterring Arabs, Deterring Peace", alluding to the Israeli policies of establishing a large military deterrence capacity and fending off so-called Palestinian "peace offensives" (Note: Finkelstein attributes Avner Yaniv with this phrase https://archive.org/details/dilemmasofsecuri00yani/page/69/mode/2up?q=offensive).

The book then gives individual attention to Israel's military operations in Gaza since 2008, most notably Operation Cast Lead of 2008–2009, Operation Pillar of Defense of 2012 and Operation Protective Edge of 2014. The Goldstone Report is also discussed in detail along with its impact and Judge Goldstone's followup statement. Finkelstein uses both quotes from IDF soldiers who served during Operation Protective Edge and eyewitness testimony to demonstrate that the IDF used indiscrimate force and did not attempt to minimize civilian casualties.

In addition, the book also describes the raid of the Mavi Marmara, in detail along with the Israeli Turkel report and the UN Panel of Inquiry report, both which he describes as a white-wash. The book further critiques the Amnesty International reports on the 2014 Gaza War and the United Nations Fact Finding Mission on the 2014 Israel–Gaza conflict.

Finkelstein argues that Israel's actions are in clear violation of international law. He argues that the promises of international law and the concept of human rights, represented by organizations such as Amnesty International, Human Rights Watch and the United Nations Human Rights Council, have failed in the case of Gaza.

== Outline ==
The book is divided into 4 parts.

1. Part 1, Operation Cast Lead
  1. Self-Defense
  2. Deterring Arabs, Deterring Peace
  3. Spin Control
  4. Human Shields
2. Part 2, The Goldstone report
  1. A Zionist Bears Witness
  2. The Star Witness Recants
3. Part 3, The Mavi Marmara
  1. Murder on the High Seas
  2. Whitewash I: The Turkel Report
  3. Whitewash II: The UN Panel Report
4. Part 4, Operation Protective Edge
  1. Stalled Juggernaut
  2. Israel Has the Right to Defend Itself
  3. Betrayal I: Amnesty International
  4. Betrayal II: UN Human Rights Council

The appendix of the book contains an analysis of the legality of the occupation of Gaza and the West Bank.

== Reception ==
Nubar Hovsepian wrote in the Journal of Palestine Studies that the book is "overwhelming, but a must-read nevertheless". Publishers Weekly highlighted the amount of documentation the book uses to support its content and wrote that "readers with fixed positions, either in agreement or disagreement with Finkelstein, will find much to engage with here".

Charles Glass wrote in his review for The Intercept that "No one who ventures an opinion on Gaza ... is entitled to do so without taking into account the evidence in this book."
