= The Holocaust Industry =

2000 book by Norman Finkelstein

- Cover of the first edition
- Author: Norman G. Finkelstein
- Language: English
- Subject: Holocaust studies
- Publisher: Verso Books
- Publication date: 2000
- Publication place: United States
- Media type: Print (hardback and paperback)
- ISBN: 1-85984-488-X (newest edition, paperback)
- OCLC: 52486141
- Dewey Decimal: 940.53/18 22
- LC Class: D804.3 .F567 2003
- Preceded by: A Nation on Trial
- Followed by: Beyond Chutzpah

The Holocaust Industry: Reflections on the Exploitation of Jewish Suffering is a book by Norman Finkelstein arguing that the American Jewish establishment exploits the memory of the Nazi Holocaust for political and financial gain and to further Israeli interests. According to Finkelstein, this "Holocaust industry" has corrupted Jewish culture and the authentic memory of the Holocaust.

The book was controversial, attracting both praise as well as criticism. Supporters of the book, such as preeminent Holocaust scholar Raul Hilberg, described it as a substantive engagement with issues such as the politics of memory. Critics of the book, such as Peter Novick, declared that many of Finkelstein's assertions are “pure invention” and called the book “a twenty-first century updating of The Protocols of the Elders of Zion.”

== Conception ==
The book began as a journal review of The Holocaust in American Life, by Peter Novick.

== Synopsis ==
=== The Holocaust Industry ===
Finkelstein follows the Holocaust's standing in American life from the postwar years to the end of the 20th century. Before the 1967 Arab–Israeli War, he argues, the Holocaust took little part in the lives of American Gentiles and Jews. There was, for example, at that time only a small number of books and films on the Holocaust and few works of scholarship. Not until the late 20th century, especially after the 1967 War, did the Holocaust take up its role as the foremost historical event in the American mind – so Finkelstein argues.

Finkelstein views this growing American fixation with the Holocaust through a materialist lens. After World War II, he claims, the leaders of American Jewish organizations (like the Anti-Defamation League and the American Jewish Committee) understood assimilation and access to elite power to be in their own interest. Thus these organizations distanced themselves from Israel, moderated their demands for German denazification, and collaborated with McCarthyite investigations. In the 1960s, however, the American government began a friendlier relationship with the Israeli government; and the interests of American Jewish leaders changed. Their organizations began openly to support Israel and espouse a Holocaust ideology that emphasized (1) the Holocaust as a unique historical event and (2) the Holocaust as the climax of an eternal anti-Semitism. Finkelstein argues that this Holocaust ideology does not fit with academic Holocaust scholarship; rather it serves to defend Israel and American Jewish leaders from criticism.

=== Fraudulent memoirs ===
Many popular Holocaust books by contemporary writers have, in Finkelstein's view, little scholarly merit. He faults Deborah Lipstadt's 1993 book Denying the Holocaust for expanding the definition of Holocaust denial to include questioning its uniqueness. He writes that Daniel Goldhagen, in his 1996 book Hitler’s Willing Executioners, inaccurately characterizes the entire German people as eager Jew murderers driven by pathological hatred.

The U.S. Holocaust Memorial Museum in Washington, D.C., which opened in 1993, gets sharp criticism from Finkelstein. Why, he asks, did the victims of the Holocaust get a national museum but not the victims of American slavery or the American Indian extermination? He also argues that the Gentile victims of the Holocaust – especially the Romani victims of the Porajmos – got only token recognition in the museum. More generally he claims that museum's leadership is committed to political support of the Israeli state, pointing to its praise of pro-Zionist literature and its condemnation of anti-Zionist literature.

Finkelstein takes book reviewers and historians to task for praising two Holocaust memoirs which he reveals to be fraudulent: The Painted Bird by Jerzy Kosiński (1965) and Fragments by Binjamin Wilkomirski (1995).

=== Swiss banks ===
In 1995, the World Jewish Congress initiated a lawsuit against Swiss banks to recover the assets in accounts left dormant by victims of the Holocaust. Finkelstein accuses the leaders of Jewish organizations of exaggerating the size of the assets and of using Swiss payouts to fund their own pet projects. He is equally critical of a similar lawsuit directed at German banks and of attempts to get monetary compensation from the Polish government.

== Reviews and critiques ==
Since its publication in 2000, The Holocaust Industry has been polarizing, eliciting strongly negative and positive reviews. For The Nation, Neve Gordon commented that "Finkelstein does not hesitate to use blunt language rather than euphemism; and although he usually applies words in a precise manner, at times he gets carried away in his analysis."

In The New York Times Book Review, historian Omer Bartov said the book "is filled with precisely the kind of shrill hyperbole that Finkelstein rightly deplores in much of the current media hype over the Holocaust; it is brimming with the same indifference to historical facts, inner contradictions, strident politics and dubious contextualizations; and it oozes with the same smug sense of moral and intellectual superiority." Bartov acknowledged, "Like any conspiracy theory, it contains several grains of truth", but added that "like any such theory, it is both irrational and insidious."

The book was defended by Holocaust scholar Raul Hilberg, who said (as quoted on Finkelstein’s website) in an August 2000 interview with Brazilian media:

Today [Finkelstein] is rather unpopular and his book will certainly not become a best seller, but what it says is basically true even though incomplete. It is more a journalistic account than an in depth study on the topic, which would need to be much longer.

Referring to the book's accusations about Swiss banks and forced labor, Hilberg later wrote:

I would now say in retrospect that he was actually conservative, moderate and that his conclusions are trustworthy.... I am by no means the only one who, in the coming months or years, will totally agree with Finkelstein's breakthrough.

Israeli historian Moshe Zuckermann welcomed the book as an "irreplaceable critique of the 'instrumentalisation of the past' and underlined its 'liberating potential'".

Oren Baruch Stier, reviewing The Holocaust Industry for the journal Prooftexts, summarized it as a "small and pungent manifesto" and ended his review by noting, "there are worthwhile arguments here, if one can stomach the bile in which they float".

In the journal Historical Materialism, Enzo Traverso wrote that Finkelstein's book "contains a core of truth that must be recognised, but it lends itself, due to its style and several of its main arguments, to the worst uses and instrumentalisations." He suggested that the book should be seen as an opportunity for stimulating public debates about difficult topics related to "the politics of memory and on the public uses of history".

Donald D. Denton, editor of the journal Terrorism and Political Violence, observed that The Holocaust Industry "will be valuable as an historical piece of research and of interest to those who now attempt to deal with the contemporary genocides and the subsequent generations of children of those who endured such horrors". Denton opined that the controversial book "probably cost [Finkelstein] ... tenure at DePaul University".

Wolfgang Benz stated in Le Monde: "It is impossible to learn anything from Finkelstein's book. At best, it is interesting for a psychotherapist." In the same newspaper, Jean Birnbaum faulted Finkelstein for an approach that "hardly cares about nuance". Rony Brauman wrote in the preface to the French edition (L'Industrie de l'Holocauste, Paris, La Fabrique, 2001) that some assertions by Finkelstein (especially on the impact of the Six-Day War) are wrong, others being pieces of "propaganda".

Peter Novick, whose The Holocaust in American Life Finkelstein had credited with providing the "initial stimulus" for The Holocaust Industry, said in the July 28, 2000 issue of The Jewish Chronicle that Finkelstein's book is replete with "false accusations", "egregious misrepresentations", "absurd claims" and "repeated mis-statements" ("A charge into darkness that sheds no light"). Finkelstein replied on his website to five specific charges made by Novick, and then more broadly attacked the "intellectual standards" of his opponents.

Historian Hasia Diner characterized both Finkelstein and Novick as "harsh critics of American Jewry from the left", and challenged "the myth of silence" put forth by the two authors that American Jews did not begin to commemorate the Holocaust until after 1967.

Andrew Ross, reviewing the book for Salon, said that Finkelstein downplays documented wrongdoing by Swiss and German institutions in the reparations process and exaggerates claims that Jewish organizations routinely swindled Holocaust survivors, arguing that delays in compensation were largely due to legal and procedural factors rather than institutional malfeasance.

Alvin Hirsch Rosenfeld wrote that The Holocaust Industry "is representative of a polemical engagement with the Holocaust" that places it in line with a number of other works by "critics of Holocaust consciousness, all of whom stress the utilitarian function of memory", and who see many modern references to The Holocaust as "means of enhancing ethnic identity and advancing political agendas of one kind or another". Rosenfeld also noted that the book presents those ideas in a very "harsh and inflammatory way."

=== Finkelstein's response to critics ===
Finkelstein responded to his critics in the foreword to the second edition (published in 2003), writing: "Mainstream critics allege that I conjured a 'conspiracy theory' while those on the Left ridicule the book as a defense of 'the banks'. None, so far as I can tell, question my actual findings."

== Selected publication history ==
- 2000; First edition, Verso Books (London) 150 p. Hardcover, ISBN 1-85984-773-0
- 2003; Second edition expanded, Verso Books (London) 286 p. Paperback, ISBN 1-85984-488-X

== See also ==
- Image and Reality of the Israel–Palestine Conflict
- Jewish lobby
- Nazi gold
