= Progressive stack =

Prioritizing speakers by social group

The progressive stack is a method of sorting a queue of speakers by social position, giving speaking priority to members of groups seen as traditionally marginalized. It is used as a first step in consensus decision-making in which simple majorities have less power. The social position of the speakers is determined on the basis of race, sex, social class, sexual orientation, gender identity and other group membership, with preference given to members of groups that are considered the most marginalized.

== Overview ==
The progressive stack technique attempts to counter what proponents believe is a flaw in traditional representative democracy, where the majority is heard while the minority or non-dominant groups are silenced or ignored. In practice, dominant or majority groups may be interpreted by progressive stack practitioners to mean wealthy or upper class people, white people, men, heterosexual or cisgender people, people without physical or mental disabilities, and members of majority religions, while non-dominant or minority groups include poor or working class people, people of color, women, sexual and gender minorities, neurodivergent people, people with physical or mental disabilities, members of minority religions, and very young or older people.

The "stack" in the Occupy movement is the list of speakers who are commenting on proposals or asking questions in public meetings. Anyone can request to be added to the stack. In meetings that don't use the progressive stack, people typically speak in the order they were added to the queue. In meetings that use the progressive stack, people from non-dominant groups are allowed to speak before people from dominant groups, by facilitators, or stack-keepers, urging speakers to "step forward, or step back" based on which racial, age, or gender group they belong to.

== Criticism ==
A. Barton Hinkle, a columnist for the Richmond Times-Dispatch, has expressed the opinion that "lining up speakers by race and gender might not seem fair on an individual level", and suggests that proponents of the progressive stack care more about class struggle and victimization than individual concerns.

James Kierstead, a senior lecturer in Classics at the Victoria University of Wellington, has argued that while the progressive stack might have honourable and democratic intentions, its differential treatment of people could be seen as demeaning to those prioritized and discriminatory. He argues that it could lead to unhealthy in-group and out-group dynamics and prioritize demographic characteristics over willingness to speak, or the relevance, insight, or novelty of speakers' views, and has proposed rotation, in which all participants are given a turn to speak, and random allotment of speaking turns as better alternatives.

== See also ==
- Identity politics
- Intersectionality
- Reverse racism
- Oppression Olympics
