= Ruth Bettina Birn =

Canadian historian and author

- Born: 1952 (age 73–74); Stuttgart, West Germany
- Occupations: Historian, author

Academic background
- Education: Stuttgart University

Academic work
- Era: 20th century
- Institutions: War Crimes and Crimes Against Humanity Section, Canadian Department of Justice
- Main interests: Modern European history History of the Holocaust
- Notable works: A Nation on Trial: The Goldhagen Thesis and Historical Truth

Ruth Bettina Birn (born 1952) is a Canadian historian and author whose main field of research is the security forces of Nazi Germany and their role in the Holocaust. For nearly 15 years, she held a position of chief historian in the war crimes section at the Canadian Department of Justice. Birn co-authored A Nation on Trial: The Goldhagen Thesis and Historical Truth with Norman Finkelstein.

== Education and career ==
Ruth Bettina Birn was born in 1952 in Stuttgart, West Germany. In 1985, she received her PhD from the Stuttgart University with the dissertation Die Höheren SS-und Polizeiführer: Himmlers Vertreter im Reich und in den besetzten Gebieten ("Higher SS and Police Leaders: Himmler's Representatives in the Reich and the Occupied Territories"), published in Düsseldorf in 1986 as a book. From 1991 to 2005, she was the chief historian at the War Crimes and Crimes Against Humanity Section of the Canadian Department of Justice.

Birn studied the Estonian Security Police and SD, publishing a book on this topic, Die Sicherheitspolizei in Estland 1941 – 1944: Eine Studie zur Kollaboration im Osten ("The Security Police in Estonia 1941 – 1944: A Study in Collaboration in the East"). Based on hundreds of Security Police investigation files kept in the Estonian State Archives, the book analyzes the persecution policies against various victim groups: Communists, Jews, Roma, Russians, Soviet prisoners of war, and so-called asocials.

== A Nation on Trial ==
Since the 1970s, Birn conducted research at the Central Office of the State Justice Administrations for the Investigation of National Socialist Crimes in Germany. She was sharply critical of the 1996 book by Daniel Goldhagen, Hitler's Willing Executioners, whom she accused of being highly selective with the materials from the Central Office in her article "Historiographical review: Revising the Holocaust", published in The Historical Journal.

Birn's essays were later published in book form as A Nation on Trial: The Goldhagen Thesis and Historical Truth. along with a critical article, "Daniel Jonah Goldhagen's 'Crazy' Thesis", by American political science professor Norman Finkelstein (first published) in the UK political journal New Left Review.

In response to their book, Goldhagen sought a retraction and apology from Birn, threatening her at one point to sue her for libel, and, according to Slate, declaring Finkelstein "a supporter of Hamas". The force of the counterattacks against Birn and Finkelstein from Goldhagen's supporters was described by Israeli journalist Tom Segev as "bordering on cultural terrorism ... The Jewish establishment has embraced Goldhagen as if he were Mr Holocaust himself ... All this is absurd, because the criticism of Goldhagen is backed up so well."

The historian Hans Mommsen describes Birn's criticism as harsh; he writes that, in an effort to refute Goldhagen's assertion that Jews and Gentiles were treated completely differently by the regime, Birn comes "close to obviously unintended apologetics". At the same time, he regrets that Goldhagen reacted to Birn's criticism by threatening her and her editor with legal action, thus choosing this route in order "to silence his academic critics".

== Selected works ==
=== In English ===
- A Nation on Trial: The Goldhagen Thesis and Historical Truth. With Norman Finkelstein. New York: Henry Holt, 1998. ISBN 978-0-8050-5871-0.

=== In German ===
- Die höheren SS- und Polizeiführer: Himmlers Vertreter im Reich und in den besetzten Gebieten. Düsseldorf, 1986.
- Die Sicherheitspolizei in Estland 1941 – 1944: Eine Studie zur Kollaboration im Osten. Paderborn, 2006. ISBN 3506756141.
