= Sim Kern =

American science fiction writer and activist

Sim Kern is an environmental journalist, speculative fiction writer, and activist based in Houston, Texas.

== Early life ==
Kern grew up in the Midwestern United States. Kern's father is Jewish, and they identify as Jewish. They attended Oberlin College in Oberlin, Ohio, and initially studied environmental science before graduating with a bachelor's degree in English and Creative Writing. After college, in 2007, Kern moved to Houston and got hired by a nonprofit to teach marine biology to elementary schoolers. Afterward, they remained in Houston and spent ten years teaching middle and high school English in Houston Public Schools. During their early 20s, Kern performed in a punk band and was involved with Occupy Houston, an offshoot of the Occupy Wall Street movement.

== Writing ==
Kern has published four works of fiction and one work of non-fiction. They have also reported on environmental harms caused by the petrochemical industry and the privatization of space exploration by billionaires.

Recurring themes in Kern's fiction include climate change, species extinction, rebellion, reproductive rights, class inequality, abuse, gender, and sexual orientation. Despite the heavy subject matter, Kern's work often has hopeful themes and storylines of ordinary people surviving and resisting oppression. These qualities have led to Kern's work frequently being described as being part of the solarpunk cultural movement, a response to the surge of post-apocalyptic, dystopian, and climate doom media that dominated the 2010s. Solarpunk literature and Kern's work are characterized by sustainability, racial and gender equality, a do-it-yourself ethos, a refusal of pessimism, and often post-capitalist themes.

Kern has commented that they choose to write hopeful narratives about the future as "a break from all the awfulness," adding that even if things never get better in their lifetime, "the fascists can't keep [them] from creating a better world in [their] head." They have also discussed how their writing was influenced by the nationwide protests following the police murder of George Floyd and killing of Breonna Taylor in the summer of 2020. Through their fiction, they "explore how you move forward as an organizer and as a person who hopes for a better world" when justice is denied or slow to come.

Kern uses neopronouns in some of their stories. As a trans, non-binary writer who uses they/them pronouns and has many friends in the LGBTQ community, Kern has described their use of neopronouns as "one of the least speculative elements" of their stories.

Kern has cited Octavia Butler and Ursula Le Guin among their creative influences.

== Activism ==
Kern has been a vocal advocate for environmental justice, transgender rights, and Palestinian rights. They have developed a sizable social media following on platforms like Instagram and TikTok, where they have more than 500,000 combined followers.

In March 2023, Kern kicked off a fundraising readathon called #TransRightsReadathon. Kern planned the readathon in response to a wave of anti-trans legislation sweeping statehouses across the country, and they used the opportunity to spotlight books by transgender writers and to raise money for transgender causes. The idea began when Kern attended a rally in Houston hosted by Ron DeSantis and protested by silently reading books banned by DeSantis in Florida. Afterward, wanting to do more, Kern learned of a fundraiser organized by Mercury Stardust for the LGBTQ organization Point of Pride and felt inspired to help fundraise by organizing "BookTok," the subculture of users on TikTok who create, share, and like book related content. Over the course of the 2023 #TransRightsReadathon, more than 2,000 participants read 7,800 books and raised $234,000 for transgender rights organizations. The readathon has become an annual fundraising event.

After the October 7 attacks in 2023, Kern, who is Jewish, became a prominent anti-Zionist Jewish voice on social media. Kern used their platform to draw attention to Palestinian writers, promote the #ReadPalestine social media movement, and to discuss the history of the conflict. Kern raised more than $500,000 in direct aid for families in Gaza affected by the war. Kern's April 2025 non-fiction book, Genocide Bad: Notes on Palestine, Jewish History, and Collective Liberation, is published by Interlink Books, the only Palestinian-owned book publishing company in the United States. The book will be distributed by Simon & Schuster.

Kern was interviewed and featured in the award-winning documentary feature film Seeds for Liberation (2026) by director Matthew Solomon. The film discusses the Free Palestine movement and references Kern's nonfiction book, Genocide Bad: Notes on Palestine, Jewish History, and Collective Liberation.

Kern shared that after the publication of Depart, Depart! in 2020, a Wyoming Red Cross staff member who read the book reached out to them. The novella, which follows a young transgender man in Houston trying to survive in the immediate aftermath of a devastating hurricane, inspired the Red Cross worker to design more LGBTQ-inclusive disaster response protocols in their state.

The cover art of Kern's book, The Free People's Village, was designed by Egyptian artist Ganzeer, whose art provided a prominent backdrop to the 2011 Egyptian Revolution. Ganzeer was forced into exile after the revolution and settled in Houston, where Kern met him.

== Bibliography ==
=== Books ===
- Depart, Depart!. Stelliform Press. 2020. ISBN 978-1-7770917-0-5.
- Real Sugar is Hard to Find. Android Press. 2022. ISBN 1-958121-03-7.
- Seeds for the Swarm. Stelliform Press. 2022. ISBN 978-1-7776823-0-9.
- The Free People's Village. Levine Querido. 2023. ISBN 1-64614-266-7.
- Genocide Bad: Notes on Palestine, Jewish History, and Collective Liberation. Interlink Books. 2025. ISBN 978-1-62371-636-3.
