= Ange-Marie Hancock =

American professor

Ange-Marie Hancock is the Executive Director of the Kirwan Institute for the Study of Race and Ethnicity and ENGIE-Axium Endowed Professor of Political Science at The Ohio State University. She was previously the Dean's Professor of Gender Studies and Professor of Political Science and Gender and Sexuality Studies at the University of Southern California. Hancock is an applied political theorist and scholar of intersectionality. Hancock previously worked as CEO of RISIST, the Research Institute for the Study of Intersectionality and Social Transformation.

== Education and early career ==
Hancock received her B.A. in Politics from New York University in 1991. She earned an M.A. and Ph.D. in Political Science from University of North Carolina at Chapel Hill in 1997 and 2000, respectively. Before attending graduate school, Hancock was employed at the National Basketball Association, where she helped research and propose a business model for what would become the Women's National Basketball Association (WNBA).

== Career ==
Hancock is a scholar of intersectionality and political science. Scholars reviewing her 2016 book, Intersectionality: An Intellectual History, praised it for providing "a rich history of intersectional thought and practice" and write that Hancock's book "helps us move beyond some of the problems that have arisen as intersectionality has gained currency within the US academy."

Hancock has served on the editorial board of Perspectives on Politics and was a co-editor of Politics, Groups and Identities. Hancock is a political analyst for NBC4.

== Books ==
- Hancock, Ange-Marie. 2004. The Politics of Disgust and the Public Identity of the "Welfare Queen". New York, NY: New York University Press.
- Hancock, Ange-Marie. 2011. Solidarity Politics for Millennials: A Guide to Ending the Oppression Olympics. New York, NY: Palgrave-Macmillan.
- Hancock, Ange-Marie. 2016. Intersectionality: An Intellectual History. New York, NY: Oxford University Press.

== Selected awards ==
- Best Book, National Conference of Black Political Scientists, 2006-2007.
- Best First Book, American Political Science Association Organized Section on Race, Ethnicity & Politics, 2006-2007.
