= The Drift (magazine) =

American magazine

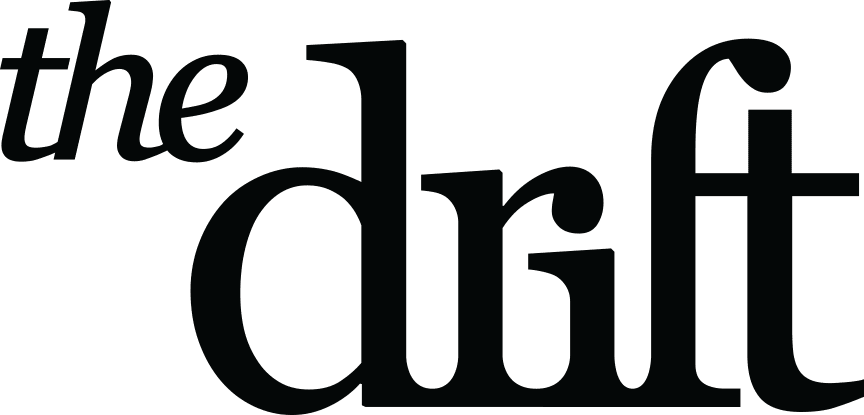
- Editor: Kiara Barrow; Rebecca Panovka
- Frequency: Three times per year
- Founder: Kiara Barrow; Rebecca Panovka
- First issue: 2020
- Country: United States
- Based in: New York City
- Language: English
- Website: thedriftmag.com

The Drift is a magazine founded in June 2020 by Rebecca Panovka and Kiara Barrow.

== History ==
In The Drift's founding essay published June 24, 2020, Barrow and Panovka wrote that they were "committed to offering a forum for young people who haven’t yet been absorbed into the media hivemind, and don’t feel hemmed in by the boundaries of the existing discourse." They told The New York Times that they were inspired by podcasts like Red Scare and Chapo Trap House and that they aspire to be "the intellectual arm" of "the leftist resurgence of the past few years and figuring out what’s next, post-Bernie, to people now awakening to leftist radicalism.”

Both of The Drift's founders attended expensive private New York City schools before studying at Harvard College. Rebecca Panovka, the daughter of corporate powerhouse lawyers Alexandra Korry and Robin Panovka, attended The Dalton School where she was a Managing Editor of her school newspaper and interned for the New York Observer before studying English and Philosophy in college while editing The Harvard Book Review as a student at her college (which was Harvard). She has worked as a tutor and fact checker. Kiara Barrow, who is also an editor at Penguin Press, graduated from Dwight School in New York City and studied English at Harvard, where she ran The Harvard Advocate. Both graduated from Harvard in 2016.

Much of the magazine's first issue was written before the onset of COVID-19 mitigations; its sections were titled “About the Pandemic” and “Not About the Pandemic." Later issues have featured tongue-in-cheek headers that organize their contents retroactively; issue 10 featured the sections “Saving Face” and “Face Value.”

Parties to celebrate the release of The Drift's issues "have become a media frenzy of their own," receiving coverage in magazines such as The Atlantic and New York.

In September 2022, David Zwirner announced he was providing funding as part of an effort to fund a new generation of writers. In a statement to ARTnews, Barrow said that despite Zwirner's funding,The Drift would remain editorially independent and would not be part of David Zwirner Books.

== Content ==
Notable essays from the magazine include Oscar Schwartz's “What Was the TED Talk?: Some Thoughts on the ‘Inspiresting,’” which criticizes the TED conference's focus on contrived, oversimplified content and elitist undercurrents; a criticism of Anthony Fauci's celebrity status by Know Your Enemy co-host Sam Adler-Bell; and "Case Sensitive," an argument for not capitalizing the term Black by the philosopher Nicholas Whittaker.

Story ideas go through many rounds of editing even before they are green-lit, receiving contributions from at least four editors by the final draft.

== Reception ==
The New Yorker editor David Remnick told The New York Times that “I would be a fool not to read something like The Drift.”
