= Peter Novick =

American historian (1934–2012)

- Born: July 26, 1934; Jersey City, New Jersey, U.S.
- Died: February 17, 2012 (aged 77); Chicago, Illinois, U.S.
- Education: Columbia University (B.A., 1957; Ph.D., 1965)
- Occupations: Historian; Professor of History
- Employer: University of Chicago
- Known for: The Holocaust in American Life; That Noble Dream
- Notable work: That Noble Dream: The "Objectivity Question" and the American Historical Profession (1988); The Holocaust in American Life (1999)
- Spouse: Joan Novick
- Children: 1

Peter Novick (July 26, 1934 – February 17, 2012) was an American historian who was Professor of History at the University of Chicago. He was best known for writing That Noble Dream: The "Objectivity Question" and the American Historical Profession and The Holocaust in American Life. The latter title has also been published as The Holocaust and Collective Memory, especially for non-US anglophonic markets.

== Major works ==
=== That Noble Dream ===
That Noble Dream: The "Objectivity Question" and the American Historical Profession questions the origins and prevalence of the notion of objectivity in current and 20th century history. It focuses on developments in university history departments within the United States, though it traces the concept of objectivity in history's origins back to 19th century Germany and Leopold von Ranke.

=== The Holocaust in American Life ===
Jeffrey C. Alexander has examined Novick's "particularization of the Holocaust" in The Holocaust in American Life, he has contrasted his universalizing view of the Holocaust (that it can be a lesson for all peoples), versus what he perceives as Novick's inextricable connection of the genocide with nationalism and Jewish identity politics.

Novick's thesis, that the Holocaust was largely ignored in the years after World War II due to Cold War concerns that encouraged a rapprochement with West Germany and a distaste among American Jews for the claiming of victim status, has been challenged in the years since his book was published, as for example by Hasia Diner in her book We Remember With Reverence and Love: American Jews and the Myth of Silence After the Holocaust, 1945-1962, and in the anthology After the Holocaust: Challenging the Myth of Silence.

== Career ==
Novick founded the Jewish studies program at the University of Chicago.

== Personal life ==
Novick earned his bachelor's and doctoral degrees from Columbia University, in 1957 and 1965 respectively.

Though deemed a precursor, Novick was a sharp critic of Norman Finkelstein, but also of Finkelstein's opponent Alan Dershowitz. He died in 2012 in Chicago of lung cancer.

== Bibliography ==
- The Resistance versus Vichy: The Purge of Collaborators in Liberated France. New York: Columbia University Press. 1968.
- That Noble Dream: The "Objectivity Question" and the American Historical Profession. Cambridge UP. 1988.
- The Holocaust in American life. Boston: Houghton Mifflin. 1999.
- "Comments on Aleida Assmann's lecture : comment delivered at the Twentieth Annual Lecture of the GHI, November 16, 2006". Bulletin of the German Historical Institute. 40: 26–31. Spring 2007.
  - Assmann, Aleida (Spring 2007). "Response to Peter Novick". Bulletin of the German Historical Institute. 40: 33–38.
