= Enzo Traverso =

Italian historian (born 1957)

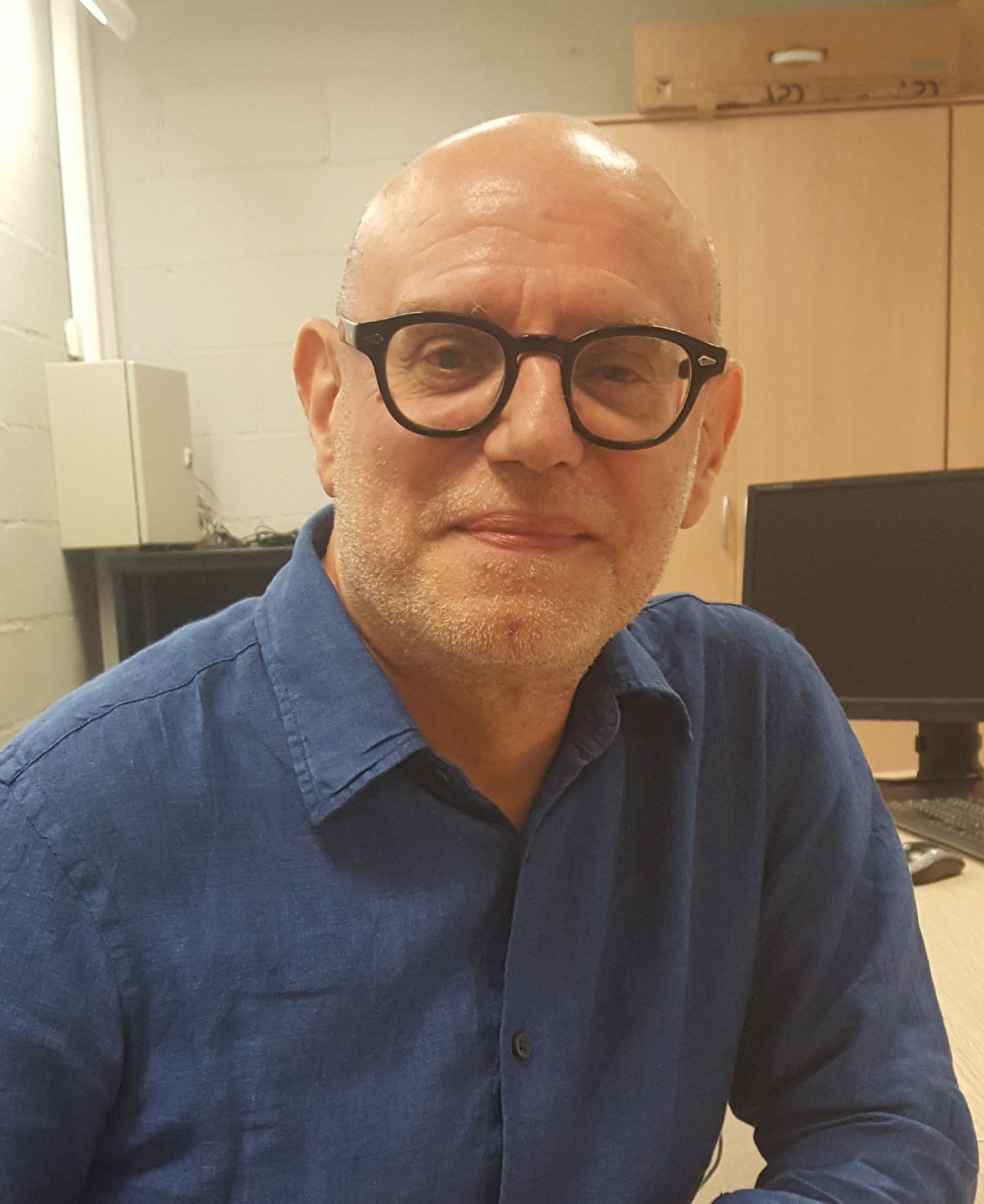
- Traverso in 2019
- Born: October 14, 1957 (age 69); Gavi, Piedmont, Italy
- Occupation: Intellectual historian
- Employer: Cornell University

Academic background
- Education: University of Genoa (Laurea); École des hautes études en sciences sociales (PhD)
- Doctoral advisor: Michael Löwy

Enzo Traverso (Italian: [traˈvɛrso]; born 14 October 1957) is an Italian scholar of European intellectual history. He is the author of several books on critical theory, the Holocaust, Marxism, memory, totalitarianism, revolution, and contemporary historiography. His books have been translated into numerous languages. After living and working in France for over 25 years, he is currently the Susan and Barton Winokur Professor in the Humanities at Cornell University.

== Education ==
Enzo Traverso obtained a master's degree (Laurea) in modern history at the University of Genoa (Italy) in 1982. After moving to Paris in 1985 to further pursue his academic trajectory he completed his PhD at School for Advanced Studies in the Social Sciences (EHESS) in 1989, under the direction of Michael Löwy. In 2009 he achieved the academic qualification of habilitation (accreditation to supervise research).

== Career ==
From 1989 through 1991, he worked for the International Institute for Research and Education (IIRE) based in Amsterdam, and after that in the Library of contemporary international documentation (BDIC) in Nanterre. He also held the position of a lecturer in the Departement of Political science at the University of Paris VIII (1993–1995) and at School for Advanced Studies in the Social Sciences (EHESS) (1994–1997). In 1995 he was hired by the University of Picardie Jules Verne in Amiens as an assistant professor. He was later promoted to full professor, a post he held from 2009 to 2013, when he joined the faculty at Cornell. In 2014, he was awarded the Premio Pozzale Luigi Russo and in 2016, the Huésped de Honor Extraordinario, Universidad Nacional de La Plata, in recognition of his historical scholarship.

== Works ==
=== Original works ===
- Les nouveaux visages du fascisme, Textuel, 2017
- Mélancolie de gauche : La force d’une tradition cachée (XIXe-XXIe siècle), La Découverte, Paris, 2016.
- La fin de la modernité juive : Histoire d'un tournant conservateur, La Découverte, Paris, 2013.
- L'histoire comme champ de bataille : Interpréter les violences du XXe siècle, La Découverte, Paris, 2011.
- À Feu et à sang : De la guerre civile européenne, 1914-1945, Stock, Paris, 2007.
- Le Passé, mode d'emploi : Histoire, mémoire, politique, 2005, La Fabrique, Paris.
- La Pensée dispersée : Figures de l'exil judéo-allemand, 2004.
- La Violence nazie : Essai de généalogie historique, 2002, La Fabrique, Paris.
- Le Totalitarisme : Le XXe siècle en débat, 2001.
- Pour une critique de la barbarie moderne : écrits sur l'histoire des Juifs et l'antisémitisme, Éditions Page deux (Cahiers libres), Lausanne, 2000.
- L'Histoire déchirée, essai sur Auschwitz et les intellectuels, Éditions du Cerf, Paris, 1997.
- Siegfried Kracauer. Itinéraire d’un intellectuel nomade, La Découverte, Paris, 1994.
- Les Juifs et l'Allemagne, de la symbiose judéo-allemande à la mémoire d'Auschwitz, La Découverte, Paris, 1992.
- Les Marxistes et la question juive, La Brèche-PEC, Montreuil, 1990.
- Left-Wing Melancholia: Marxism, History, and Memory (New Directions in Critical Theory), Columbia University Press; 2nd Revised ed., 2017, ISBN 978-0231179423.
- Revolution: An Intellectual History, Verso, 2021, ISBN 978-1839763335.
- Gaza devant l'histoire, Montréal, Lux, 2024 ISBN 978-2-89833-185-5.

=== English translations ===
- The Marxists and the Jewish question. The history of a Debate (1843-1943), Humanities Press, New Jersey, 1994, translated by Bernard Gibbons, ISBN 0-391-03806-0
- The Jews & Germany: From the "Judeo-German Symbiosis" to the Memory of Auschwitz, U. of Nebraska Press, Lincoln, 1995, translated by Daniel Weissbort.
- Understanding the Nazi Genocide: Marxism after Auschwitz, Pluto Press, London, 1999, translated by Peter Drucker.
- The Origins of Nazi Violence, New Press, 2003, translated by Janet Lloyd.
- Fire and Blood: The European Civil War, 1914–1945, Verso, 2016
- The End of Jewish Modernity, Pluto Press, London, 2016, translated by David Fernbach.
- The Jewish Question: History of a Marxist Debate, Brill, Leiden, 2018
- Singular Past: The I in the Historiography, transl. from the French by Adam Schoene, Columbia University Press, 2022.
