= Beyond Chutzpah =

2005 book by Norman Finkelstein

Beyond Chutzpah: On the Misuse of Anti-Semitism and the Abuse of History
- Cover of the first edition
- Author: Norman G. Finkelstein
- Language: English
- Publisher: University of California Press
- Publication date: 2005
- Publication place: United States
- Media type: Print (Hardback and paperback)
- Pages: 343
- ISBN: 978-0-520-24989-9 (Newest edition, paperback)
- OCLC: 441266179
- Dewey Decimal: 956
- LC Class: DS119.7.F544
- Preceded by: The Holocaust Industry
- Followed by: This Time We Went Too Far

Beyond Chutzpah: On the Misuse of Anti-Semitism and the Abuse of History is a book by Norman Finkelstein published by the University of California Press in August 2005. The book provides a critique of arguments used to defend Israel's stance in the Israeli–Palestinian conflict, including the use of the weaponization of antisemitism to deflect criticism of Israel. The book also compares Alan Dershowitz's earlier book, The Case for Israel, with the findings of mainstream human rights organisations, such as Human Rights Watch and Amnesty International (see also Dershowitz–Finkelstein affair). It includes an epilogue entitled Dershowitz v. Finkelstein: Who’s Right and Who’s Wrong? by Frank Menetrez, a former Editor-in-Chief of the UCLA Law Review.

== Finkelstein on the book ==
While still a graduate student at Princeton, Finkestein had published a critique of a book by Joan Peters, From Time Immemorial (1984), which claimed that Palestine had been largely empty in the early 20th century, and that both Jewish and Arab ethnic groups were immigrants. Finkelstein declared the book a fraud.

Two decades later, Finkelstein saw the record of the Israel-Palestine conflict as much less complex than previously. Finkelstein writes that the official Zionist "Exodus version," that Arab radio broadcasts had instructed the Palestinians to flee, has been largely swept away. He believes that proof of this became available in the 1960s but had little impact. In the late 1980s, however, some studies, including some by Israelis, claimed to dispel much of what Finkelstein refers to as "the Zionist mythology" enveloping the origins of the conflict. Some scholarly debate now focuses on much narrower questions such as whether what in Finkelstein's view was "ethnic cleansing" was the intentional consequence of Zionist policy or the unintentional by-product of the 1948 Arab-Israeli war. The topic remains controversial, particularly in Israel, where mainstream historians continue to dispute the view of Israel's 1948 war of independence presented by Finkelstein.

In Beyond Chutzpah he analyses "The Not-So-New 'New Anti-Semitism'" from published sources. Finkelstein argues that the spectre of the "new anti-semitism" has been invented by supporters of Israel to brand any serious criticisms of Israel's human rights abuses as anti-semitism. The aim, Finkelstein contends, is to silence criticism of Israel's policies and to provide a cover for that country's expansionistic and illegal policies in the Palestinian territories. In the second part he analyses Alan Dershowitz's book The Case for Israel (2003).

== Attempts by Dershowitz to stop publication ==
In Beyond Chutzpah Finkelstein documents what he says is the falsification of Israel's human rights record by Dershowitz and his plagiarism of research from Joan Peters' book From Time Immemorial. In response, Dershowitz's lawyers wrote letters to the University of California Press threatening a lawsuit if they published the book. Dershowitz also wrote to the Governor of California, Arnold Schwarzenegger, asking him to stop the book from being published. Schwarzenegger responded that "he is not inclined to otherwise exert influence in this case because of the clear, academic freedom issue it presents". According to Jon Weiner, writing in The Nation, Dershowitz' lawyers contacted the president of the University of California, the university provost, seventeen directors of the university press and nineteen members of the university press’s faculty editorial committee to attempt to stop the publication of the book.

Eventually, Dershowitz backed off and the book was published by UC Press, albeit with some minor modifications as a result of Dershowitz's threat.

== Reviews ==
Writing The Guardian in 2008, Ian Pindar said: "It's an academic spat of epic proportions, but while Finkelstein wins the moral argument, his combative tone, born of exasperation, is unlikely to calm the debate."

In his cover blurb for the publisher, Baruch Kimmerling, Professor of Sociology at the Hebrew University of Jerusalem, wrote that Beyond Chutzpah is "the most comprehensive, systematic, and well-documented work of its kind. It is one of the harshest—rational and nonemotional—texts about the daily practices of the occupation and colonization of the Palestinian territories by Israel, and it is an excellent demonstration of how and why the blind defenders of Israel, by basing their arguments on false facts and figures, actually bring more damage than gains to their cause."

Amahl Bishara reviewing the book for 2005/2006 issue of The Arab Studies Journal wrote that the book is "an extremely well-researched account" that effectively "dismantles" Dershowitz's arguments.

Stephanie Farmer, writing for Arab Studies Quarterly in 2006 echoed Bishara, arguing that "Finkelstein' s examination reveals more than the dubious scholarship of Dershowitz", raising "important questions on the general lack of academic standards for Zionist scholars" and gets "the human rights record of the abuse of Palestinians to penetrate the bulwark of Zionism in the academy".

In 2007, As'ad AbuKhalil in his review for Journal of Palestine Studies wrote, "This is a book that should be recommended to all", as it successfully and carefully rebuts "the crude (and not-so-crude) elements of Israeli propaganda in the West".

Lisa Hajjar, writing for Human Rights Review, noted that the book is a successful critique of Dershowitz claims, although notes that it is strongly polemical, and that the real value of the books is in its analytical footnotes and appendices rather than in the aggressive prose.

Marc Saperstein, professor of Jewish history at George Washington University, wrote in conclusion of his review of Beyond Chutzpah for Middle East Journal: "If you are looking for a book that gathers for polemical purposes every anti-Israel argument in the arsenal of its opponents, and if you enjoy the rhetorical style of the arrogant academic pit bull, this may be the book for you. If you are looking for balance, fairness, context, a critical weighing of evidence on different sides of a controversial issue ... you will not find them here".

Jonathan Judaken called it a "diatribe" and a "recapitulation" of Finkelstein's argument in The Holocaust Industry "as applied to antisemitism".

His core contention is that the ‘new antisemitism’ is merely a meticulously orchestrated media extravaganza ‘not to fight anti-Semitism but rather to exploit the historical suffering of Jews in order to immunize Israel against criticism’... It is based on the overly simplistic argument that the only factor accounting for recent attacks against Jews and Jewish institutions is the territorial displacement and dispossession of Palestinians and the Israeli-Palestinian conflict, even though this is unquestionably a central source of aggravation. His position is the mirror-image of the alarmists he seeks to denounce.

However, he notes that Finkelstein is "not wrong that Foster and Epstein's book ‘came to serve as the template for subsequent productions’ in English."

== Awards ==
The University of California Press was awarded a prize for "sustained contributions to the promotion and defense of academic freedom in the Middle East and North Africa" by the Middle East Studies Association for publishing the book in the face of Dershowitz's threats.

== See also ==
- Dershowitz-Finkelstein affair
- New Historians
