= The Case for Israel =

2003 book by Alan Dershowitz

- First edition cover
- Author: Alan Dershowitz
- Language: English
- Publisher: John Wiley & Sons
- Publication date: 2003
- Publication place: United States
- Media type: Print (hardcover)
- Pages: 264
- ISBN: 978-0-471-46502-7

The Case for Israel is a 2003 book by pro-Israel American lawyer Alan Dershowitz in which the author responds to common criticisms of Israel. The Case for Israel was a New York Times bestseller.

It also led to the public controversy known as the Dershowitz–Finkelstein affair.

== Summary ==
The book is divided into several chapters, each of which addresses what Dershowitz identifies as being particularly strong accusations and myths about Israel, such as "Israel is the 'prime' human rights violator in the world" and "Israel is the cause of the Arab–Israeli conflict." Each chapter is divided into several sections. "The Accusation" states a common criticism of Israel, "The Accusers" lists several quotations from critics supporting the accusation, "The Reality" contains a short statement contradicting the accusation, and "The Proof" contains Dershowitz's explanation of his viewpoint. Edward Said and Noam Chomsky are among the critics that he quotes the most heavily. The research assistants mentioned in the book's acknowledgements include Natalie Hershlag, the birthname of Israeli-American actress Natalie Portman.

Dershowitz has released a sequel in 2005 championing the two-state solution. The book, The Case for Peace, explains what he believes is needed to be done in order to achieve peace in the Israeli–Palestinian conflict.

== Critical responses ==
In a New York Times review, Ethan Bronner called the book a polemic that argues "vehemently -- and fairly convincingly -- that contemporary European and Arab discourse on the Middle East is indefensibly unbalanced against Israel" without dismissing the scholarship of the New Historians. He notes that "Dershowitz is especially effective at pointing to the hypocrisy of many of Israel's critics."

The political scientist Norman Finkelstein has claimed the book is a "hoax" and that some of its citations are plagiarized from From Time Immemorial, a 1984 book by Joan Peters. After a heated exchange between the two on Democracy Now!, in which Finkelstein repeatedly accused Dershowitz of plagiarism and questioned his credentials to teach at Harvard University, Finkelstein released a book, Beyond Chutzpah: On the Misuse of Anti-Semitism and the Abuse of History, whose second part is about The Case for Israel. The book lists many examples of text that Finkelstein claims Dershowitz to have lifted from Peters. A Harvard Law School investigation led by former Harvard president Derek Bok found the plagiarism charges to be without merit. Finkelstein later agreed to delete all references to "plagiarism" from his book, instead writing that Dershowitz "lifted" or "appropriated" text from Peters, but said he only did it to avoid a lawsuit.

== See also ==
- Bibliography of the Arab–Israeli conflict
- The Case for Democracy
- Public diplomacy of Israel
- Right to Exist: a Moral Defense of Israel's Wars
