= Image and Reality of the Israel–Palestine Conflict =

1995 book by Norman Finkelstein

- Cover of the first edition
- Author: Norman Finkelstein
- Language: English
- Subject: Israeli–Palestinian conflict
- Publisher: Verso Books
- Publication date: 1995
- Publication place: United States
- Media type: Print (paperback)
- Pages: 256 (second edition)
- ISBN: 978-1859844427

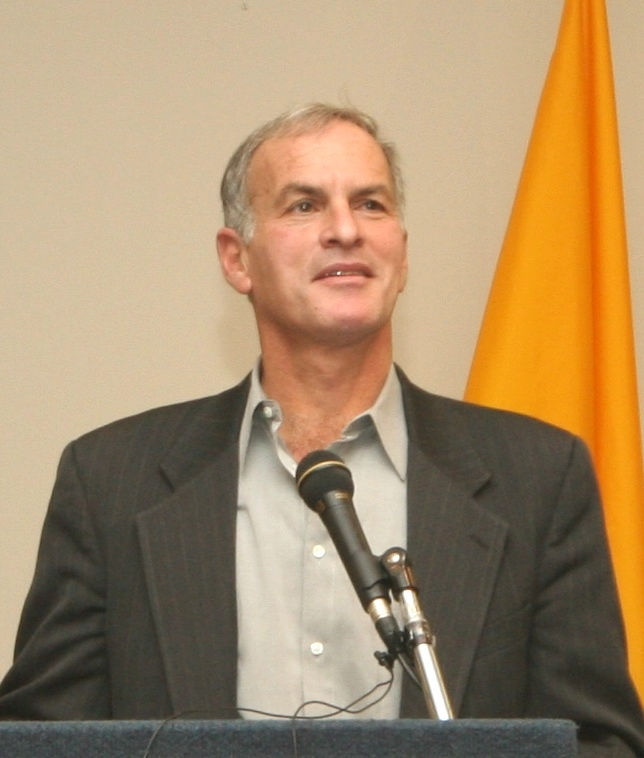
Norman Finkelstein author of Beyond Chutzpah: On the Misuse of Anti-Semitism and the Abuse of History

Image and Reality of the Israel–Palestine Conflict is a 1995 book about the Israeli–Palestinian conflict by Norman G. Finkelstein. Finkelstein examines and scrutinizes popular historical versions of the conflict by authors such as Joan Peters, Benny Morris, Anita Shapira and Abba Eban. The text draws upon Finkelstein's doctoral political science work. The 2003 revised edition offers an additional appendix devoted to criticism of Michael Oren's 2002 bestseller Six Days of War: June 1967 and the Making of the Modern Middle East.

Finkelstein, expanding upon his doctoral thesis, writes that the modern Zionist historical tradition is based on a series of ideologically charged systematic biases, all of which face considerable problems when measured up with the actual record in his view. For example, he specifically refers to the Palestinian exodus before Israeli independence and the purported causes. Finkelstein credits Zionist military aggression upon Palestinian villages and calls for a transfer of populations as driving Palestinian refugees out of their lands, rather than a voluntary exodus occurring mixed in with orders to leave from Arabic leaders and other factors as Israeli historians have written. He goes into detail on issues such as Israel's exploitation of water rights.

His book received praise from commentators critical of Israel such as Noam Chomsky and William B. Quandt. Positive reception appeared in publications such as Foreign Affairs, The Guardian and the London Review of Books.

== Contents ==
The book is a critique of historical writing that conveys the dominant narratives of Zionist mythology, focusing on the works of official Zionist historians (who he regards as "court historians") including Anita Shapira's Land and Power: The Zionist Resort to Force, 1881-1948 and Yosef Gorny's The Arab Question and Jewish Problem, the critical work of new historian Benny Morris, specifically The Birth of the Palestinian Refugee Problem, 1947-1949, and more polemical Zionist works, including Joan Peters' From Time Immemorial and the large body of writings produced by former Israeli statesmen Chaim Herzog and Abba Eban.

According to Ilan Pappé,

Toward Gorny's The Arab Question and Jewish Problem, Finkelstein shows great respect. He regards it as a reliable source for Israel's history, but questions the tone that accompanies Gorny's historical description. Whenever Gorny discerns moderation in early Zionism, or whenever he looks for the "dovish" side of the movement, Finkelstein adds adverted commas to these complimentary adjectives. Whereas Finkelstein respects Gorny as a professional authority, with whom he argues on interpretation and not on facts, he regards Shapira's The Sword of the Dove as factually distorted historical analysis... Finkelstein treats Morris as almost one of the "court historians" of Zionism due to the mitigating circumstance he granted the Israeli leadership when judging its responsibility for the expulsion of the Palestinians in 1948.

== Reviews and reception ==
In an essay about several publications about the Israel–Palestine conflict for London Review of Books, politician Ian Gilmour wrote that the book served as "both an impressive analysis of Zionist ideology and a searing but scholarly indictment of Israel's treatment of the Arabs since 1948."

In another review essay on publications about the conflict, Rita J. Simon from American University gave it a mixed review in the Middle East Studies Association Bulletin. The 2001 Verso edition, she says, is the most comprehensive and the most virulent of the books she reviewed; while she says "Finkelstein's arguments ... are usually documented with data and scholarly arguments" and "[are] more than an emotional diatribe against Israel", she criticized it for promoting the idea that "Israelis are the Nazis of the 21st century", a notion that destroys "the scholarly integrity of their work".

William B. Quandt, in a short review in Foreign Affairs, praised the book as "required reading in the continuing war of the historians".

Endorsing the book for the publishers, historian Avi Shlaim said that the "book makes a major contribution to the study of the Arab-Israeli conflict which deserves to be widely read, especially in the United States".

== See also ==
- History of Palestine
- The Holocaust Industry
- Criticism of the Israeli government
