= From Time Immemorial =

1984 book by Joan Peters

From Time Immemorial: The Origins of the Arab–Jewish Conflict over Palestine
- Author: Joan Peters
- Language: English
- Subject: The demographics of the Arab population of Palestine and of the Jewish population of the Arab world before and after the formation of the State of Israel
- Publisher: Harper & Row
- Publication date: 1984
- Publication place: United States
- Media type: Print
- Awards: National Jewish Book Award, category "Israel" (April 1985)
- ISBN: 0060152656

From Time Immemorial: The Origins of the Arab–Jewish Conflict over Palestine is a 1984 book by Joan Peters, published by Harper & Row, about the demographics of the Arab population of Palestine and of the Jewish population of the Arab world before and after the formation of the State of Israel.

It was initially positively received by reviewers such as Barbara W. Tuchman. A short time later, the book's central claims were contradicted by Norman Finkelstein, then a PhD student at Princeton University, who argued that Peters misrepresented or misunderstood the statistics on which she based her thesis.

Reputable scholars and reviewers from across the political spectrum have since discredited the central claims of Peters's book. By the time the 1985 British edition was reviewed, the book received mixed reviews, being regarded by some as wrongheaded at best and fraudulent at worst and by others as groundbreaking. Ian Gilmour, a former British Secretary of State for Defence, ridiculed the book as "pretentious and preposterous" and argued that Peters had repeatedly misrepresented demographic statistics, while Israeli historian Yehoshua Porath called it "sheer forgery". In 2004, From Time Immemorial was the subject of another academic controversy, when Finkelstein accused Harvard law professor Alan Dershowitz of largely plagiarizing his book The Case for Israel from it.

== Synopsis ==
According to Peters, most people who call themselves Palestinians are not actually Palestinians, but instead descendants of recent immigrants from Saudi Arabia, Egypt, and Syria, who came to the land in waves of immigration starting in the 19th century and continuing through the period of the British Mandate. She argues that what is referred to as the 1948 Palestinian expulsion and flight was not ethnic cleansing, but actually a population exchange that resulted from the 1948 Arab–Israeli War.

== Reception ==
When the book came out in the US in 1984, it was initially lauded by American writers and public figures such as Elie Wiesel, Saul Bellow, Barbara Tuchman, Bernard Lewis, Martin Peretz, Alan Dershowitz, and others. It was—and still is, for some—held as "totemic" on the Jewish right.

When it came out in the UK in 1985, it was met with a more hostile response, according to Mondoweiss. It received a critical review from the London Review of Books.

The book provoked public debate, but has since been refuted by reputable scholars, in Israel and elsewhere.

=== Initial reception ===
On its release in the US the book received considerable critical approval. According to Norman Finkelstein, it had garnered some two hundred favorable notices in the United States by the end of its publication in 1984. In April 1985, it was awarded the National Jewish Book Award in the "Israel" category.

Theodore H. White called Peters' work a "superlative book" that traces Middle East history with "unmatched skill".

Saul Bellow's endorsement on the cover of the book stated:

Every political issue claiming the attention of a world public has its "experts"—news managers, anchor men, ax grinders, and anglers. The great merit of this book is to demonstrate that, on the Palestinian issue, these experts speak from utter ignorance. Millions of people the world over, smothered by false history and propaganda, will be grateful for this clear account of the origins of the Palestinians. From Time Immemorial does not grudge these unhappy people their rights. It does, however, dissolve the claims made by nationalist agitators and correct the false history by which these unfortunate Arabs are imposed upon and exploited.

The book was also praised by Arthur J. Goldberg and Martin Peretz. Peretz said, "If (the book is) read, it will change the mind of our generation." Peretz suggested that there was not a single factual error in the book. Walter Reich wrote on the book "fresh and powerful ... an original analysis as well as a synoptic view of a little-known but important human story".

Jehuda Reinharz described the book as "valuable synthesis" and "new analysis" that "convincingly demonstrates that many of those who today call themselves Palestinian refugees are former immigrants or children of such immigrants". Ronald Sanders wrote that Peters' demographics "could change the entire Arab–Jewish polemic over Palestine". Sidney Zion wrote that Peters' book was "the intellectual equivalent of the Six-Day War". Timothy Foote acclaimed that the book is "part historic primer, part polemic, part revelation, and a remarkable document in itself". Lucy Dawidowicz wrote that Peters "brought into the light the historical truth about the Mideast". Barbara Probst Solomon called the book "brilliant, provocative and enlightened". Elie Wiesel described the "insight and analysis" of the book. Similar views were expressed by Paul Cowan and others.

Some reviewers, while describing the book in favourable terms, did point to some deficiencies in Peters' scholarship. In an article written for The New Leader in May 1984, Martin Kramer wrote that the book raises overdue questions about the demographic history of Palestine in a way that cannot be ignored, but also referred to "serious weaknesses" in the book, and criticised Peters' "rummaging through archives and far more balanced historical studies than her own for whatever evidence she can find to back up her thesis". However, Kramer went on to say that this was "especially unfortunate because on the central point of her book, the demographic argument, Peters is probably right."

In July 1984, Daniel Pipes, writing for Commentary, initially stated that Peters' "historical detective work has produced startling results, which should materially influence the future course of the debate about the Palestinian problem." He did, however, caution readers that "the author is not a historian or someone practiced in writing on politics, and she tends to let her passions carry her away. As a result, the book suffers from chaotic presentation and an excess of partisanship", and said that critics of her hypothesis should feel obliged to "make a serious effort to show her wrong by demonstrating that many thousands of Arabs did not emigrate to Palestine in the period under question." Two years later, in 1986, Pipes wrote in a letter to The New York Review of Books explaining positive initial reactions and later academic reviews, with the latter showing technical deficiencies of her book, but adding that Peters' central thesis, of large-scale Arab immigration into Palestine, had still not been refuted:

From Time Immemorial quotes carelessly, uses statistics sloppily, and ignores inconvenient facts. Much of the book is irrelevant to Miss Peters's central thesis. The author's linguistic and scholarly abilities are open to question. Excessive use of quotation marks, eccentric footnotes, and a polemical, somewhat hysterical undertone mar the book. In short, From Time Immemorial stands out as an appallingly crafted book.
Granting all this, the fact remains that the book presents a thesis that neither Professor Porath nor any other reviewer has so far succeeded in refuting.

Initially, the book received very few unfavorable reviews. According to Norman Finkelstein, by the end of 1984 only three critical reviews had appeared: those by Finkelstein in In These Times between 5-11 September 1984, Bill Farrell in the fall 1984 issue of the Journal of Palestine Studies, and Alexander Cockburn in The Nation on 13 October 1984. Rabbi Arthur Hertzberg, professor of religion at Dartmouth College and vice president of the World Jewish Congress remarked that he thought Peters had "cooked the statistics" and that her scholarship was "phony and tendentious", recycling ideas promoted by right-wing Zionists since the 1930s. Citing an issue of Haaretz as his reference, Finkelstein claimed that at an international conference on Palestinian demography at Haifa University in Israel in June 1986, the theses of her book were almost unanimously ridiculed by the participants. (Note: The 15 June 1986 issue of Haaretz (Israel) reported that at an international conference on Palestinian demography at Haifa University, virtually all the participants ridiculed Peters's demographic 'theses', and the most authoritative scholar in attendance, Professor Yeshoshua Ben-Arieh of Hebrew University, condemned the Peters enterprise for discrediting the 'Zionist cause'.")

=== Criticism ===
Peters' claims in the book have been refuted by reputable scholars.

==== Norman Finkelstein ====
Norman Finkelstein wrote that Peters' book was 'among the most spectacular frauds ever published on the Arab-Israeli conflict,' arguing that its substance was based on extensive plagiarization of a work by Ernst Frankenstein published in the 1940s. His 1984 review was based on his doctoral thesis, later expanded and published in Image and Reality of the Israel–Palestine Conflict. Finkelstein went into a close examination of all of Peters' notes and sources, and argued that her work persistently misrepresented or distorted the primary documents. His systematic critique of the book, attacking the two major pillars of Peters' thesis, which he regarded as a 'threadbare hoax' supported by the 'American intellectual establishment', had a major impact of later reviews of the book, especially those in Great Britain.

Firstly, in a number of lists, tables and examples Finkelstein juxtaposes the historical evidence Peters presents with extended quotations of the primary and secondary source material showing its original context. By doing so Finkelstein argues that the "evidence that Peters adduces to document massive illegal Arab immigration into Palestine is almost entirely falsified." For example, Peters cites the Hope Simpson Enquiry as having said that "Egyptian labor is being employed" in supporting her thesis of Arab immigration to Palestine. The actual Hope Simpson Report passage says: "[In Palestine] Egyptian labor is being employed in certain individual cases". In another instance, Peters cites the Anglo-American Survey of Palestine as having found that "the 'boom' conditions in Palestine in the years 1934–1936 led to an inward movement into Palestine, particularly from Syria" when, as Finkelstein demonstrates, the Survey, in the very next sentence, notes that "The depression due to the state of public disorder during 1936–1939 led to the return of these people and also a substantial outward movement of Palestinian Arabs who thought it prudent to live for a time in Lebanon and Syria."

Secondly, in a detailed analysis of the demographic study central to Peters' book, Finkelstein argued that Peters' conclusions are not supported by the data she presents. Finkelstein asserts that the study "is marred by serious flaws: (1) several extremely significant calculations are wrong; and (2) numbers are used selectively to support otherwise baseless conclusions". His primary contention is that Peters divided up Palestine into five regions for her demographic study to confuse the reader, assigning regions I, II, and IV as Israel and III and V as the West Bank, then claiming that most of the refugees from 1948 had actually emigrated from the West Bank and Gaza (Area V) a year earlier, when Finkelstein argues they just as well could have come from northern Israel (Area IV). Finkelstein's deconstruction of the evidential basis for what had become a best-selling book, hailed for its quality by numerous American intellectuals, initially encountered difficulties in securing a publishing venue that might have given his findings a wider airing. In a retrospective reflection he opined that:

The periodicals in which From Time Immemorial had already been favorably reviewed refused to run any critical correspondence (e.g. The New Republic, The Atlantic Monthly, Commentary). Periodicals that had yet to review the book rejected a manuscript on the subject as of little or no consequence (e.g. The Village Voice, Dissent, The New York Review of Books). Not a single national newspaper or columnist contacted found newsworthy that a best-selling, effusively praised "study" of the Middle East conflict was a threadbare hoax.

He also said that many of the statistics Peters cited were in Turkish, a language that Peters was unable to read. Finkelstein also mocked as a racist absurdity Peters's argument that, because Palestinians ranged so much in skin tone, from fair skinned to dark brown skinned, that they could not be descended from the same land. On the occasion of Peters' death, Finkelstein, in a long interview with Adam Horowitz, contextualized the thesis and the book's reception within Israel's emerging image problem after its invasion of Lebanon in 1982.

==== Other criticism ====
Noam Chomsky defended and promoted Finkelstein's critique, commenting in his book Understanding Power:

[As] soon as I heard that the book was going to come out in England, I immediately sent copies of Finkelstein's work to a number of British scholars and journalists who are interested in the Middle East—and they were ready. As soon as the book [From Time Immemorial] appeared, it was just demolished, it was blown out of the water. Every major journal, The Times Literary Supplement, the London Review, The Observer, everybody had a review saying, this doesn't even reach the level of nonsense, of idiocy. A lot of the criticism used Finkelstein's work without any acknowledgment, I should say—but about the kindest word anybody said about the book was "ludicrous," or "preposterous."

Chomsky recounted that, on its UK release, the book was subject to a number of scathing reviews. David and Ian Gilmour in the London Review of Books (February 7, 1985) heavily criticized Peters for ignoring Arab sources, and "censorship of Zionist sources that do not suit her case". They also present examples that in their view show that Peters misuses the sources which she does include in her work. They accuse Peters of basic errors in scholarship, such as the citation of Makrizi, who died in 1442, to support her statements about mid-nineteenth century population movements. Albert Hourani, reviewing the book in The Observer on 3 March 1985, wrote:

The whole book is written like this: facts are selected or misunderstood, tortuous and flimsy arguments are expressed in violent and repetitive language. This is a ludicrous and worthless book, and the only mildly interesting question it raises is why it comes with praise from two well-known American writers.

Following the book's negative reception in the UK, more critical reviews appeared in the United States. Columbia University professor Edward Said wrote unfavorably in The Nation on 19 October 1985, while Robert Olson dismissed the book in The American Historical Review in April 1985, concluding:

This is a startling and disturbing book. It is startling because, despite the author's professed ignorance of the historiography of the Arab-Israeli conflict and lack of knowledge of Middle Eastern history (pp. 221, 335) coupled with her limitation to sources largely in English (absolutely no Arab sources are used), she engages in the rewriting of history on the basis of little evidence. ... The undocumented numbers in her book in no way allow for the wild and exaggerated assertions that she makes or for her conclusion. This book is disturbing because it seems to have been written for purely polemical and political reasons: to prove that Jordan is the Palestinian state. This argument, long current among revisionist Zionists, has regained popularity in Israel and among Jews since the Likud party came to power in Israel in 1977.

Reviewing the book for the 28 November 1985 issue of The New York Times, Israeli historian Yehoshua Porath described it as a "sheer forgery," stating, "In Israel, at least, the book was almost universally dismissed as sheer rubbish except maybe as a propaganda weapon." In 1986, Porath repeated his views in The New York Review of Books, and published a negative review that cites many inaccuracies.

In the June 1996 edition of Foreign Affairs, William B. Quandt stated that it had been demonstrated Peters' claims in the book were based on "shoddy scholarship". Quandt praises Finkelstein's "landmark essay" on the subject, crediting him and other scholars with bringing to light the deficiencies in Peters' work. In 2005 Israeli historian Avi Shlaim credited Finkelstein with proving that the book was "preposterous and worthless". Shlaim stated that the evidence adduced by Finkelstein was "irrefutable" and the case he had made against Peters' book was "unanswerable".

Writing for The New Yorker in 2011, David Remnick described the book as "an ideological tract disguised as history", "propaganda" and "pseudo-scholarship". He stated that while the book was a commercial success and had been praised by a number of writers and critics, it had been thoroughly discredited by Israeli historian Yehoshua Porath along with many others. He also pointed out the fact that even some right-wing critics who had originally favoured the book later accepted the flaws in its scholarship.

Advocates

Rael Isaac defended the book in Commentary, claiming: "Much of Finkelstein's malevolent attack is similarly wrong. He incorrectly adds 40,000 Arabs to Miss Peters's projections of the number of Arabs who could have been expected, on the basis of natural increase, to live in the Galilee and Negev (what she calls "Area IV") in 1947, and then accuses her of not accounting for them properly. He charges her with "falsifying" the Anglo-American Survey of Palestine of 1945-46 by claiming that it discloses tens of thousands of Arab illegal immigrants who had been brought into Palestine during the war when in fact, according to Finkelstein, it states only that 3,800 laborers had been brought in. Yet the Survey does list many thousands of laborers who were brought in under official arrangements or came on their own." Peters was criticized for relying on different sources for establishing the Jewish and non-Jewish population in 1893, but Isaac defended this on the grounds that the Ottoman census would have excluded most Jews as non-citizens, while the figures cited from French geographer Vital Cuinet were likely close to the truth. Isaac conceded that Peters' attempts to reconstruct the population were tentative and overstated, and acknowledged some errors in the book, but concluded that they did not undermine Peters' thesis. Isaac also cited Arieh Avneri's The Claim of Dispossession as further supporting Peters' claims "with regard both to Arab in-migration and to Arab immigration."

In an online article entitled, "The Hazards of Making the Case for Israel" Professor Alan Dershowitz, writes:

The Chomsky-Finkelstein-Cockburn mode of ad hominem attack proved particularly successful against Peters because the words "hoax," "fraud," "fake," and "plagiarism" are so dramatic and unforgettable, as is the charge that Peters did not actually write the book. ... It did not seem to matter that none of these charges made by Chomsky, Finkelstein and Cockburn were even close to the truth. All Finkelstein had managed to show was that in a relatively small number of instances, Peters may have misinterpreted some data, ignored counter-data, and exaggerated some findings—common problems in demographic research that often appear in anti-Israel books as well.

Both Alexander Cockburn and Finkelstein have argued that Dershowitz's own book on the subject reproduced verbatim some key points of Peters' research as his own.

==== Further debate ====
The book, though widely acclaimed when it was issued, came to be regarded with disdain by a number of scholars and historians, whose analyses gave rise to a controversy. In the pages of The New York Review of Books in March 1986, Daniel Pipes and Ronald Sanders, two of the book's early supporters, engaged in an exchange with Yehoshua Porath, one of its most vehement critics. Pipes gave his overview of the state of the argument, stating Peters' work had "been received in two ways at two times. Early reviews treated her book as a serious contribution to the study of the Arab-Israeli conflict and late ones dismissed it as propaganda."

In the exchange both Pipes and Sanders accepted some of the charges that had been leveled at the book. In reference to the harsh criticism, Sanders said that Peters had "brought this upon herself" and acknowledged that "patient researchers have found numerous examples of sloppiness in her scholarship and an occasional tendency not to grasp the correct meaning of a context from which she has extracted a quotation." Pipes stated that he would not dispute the technical, historical, and literary faults identified by the book's critics.

Ronald Sanders argued that all of that does little to undermine the central thesis of Peters:

But the fact remains that there is an original and significant argument at the heart of her book, and this has scarcely been dealt with by critics, apart from Mr. Porath, who only weakly challenged it.

Anthony Lewis, in an opinion piece for The New York Times, compared American and Israeli responses to the book:

Israelis have not gushed over the book as some Americans have. Perhaps that is because they know the reality of the Palestinians' existence, as great Zionists of the past knew. Perhaps it is because most understand the danger of trying to deny a people identity. As Professor Porath says, "Neither historiography nor the Zionist cause itself gains anything from mythologizing history."

According to Rael Isaac, "most notices in Israel were favorable, and the book is being published by the Kibbutz Hameuchad—a Labor publishing house—which has assigned it to one of Israel's top translators."

== See also ==
- Image and Reality of the Israel–Palestine Conflict
