= Dershowitz–Finkelstein affair =

Public feud between Alan Dershowitz and Norman Finkelstein

- Part of debates on Israel
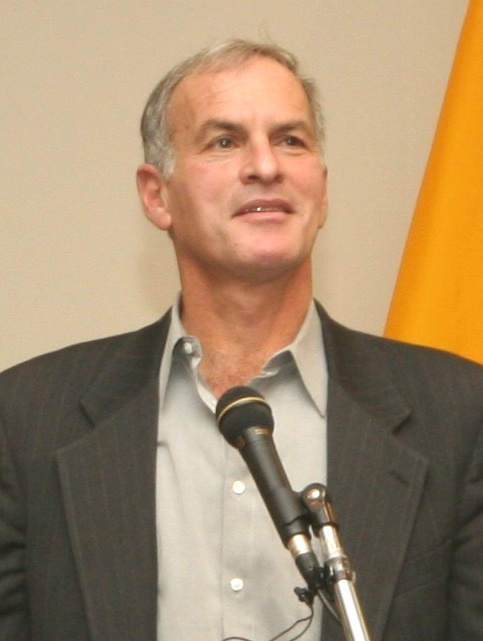
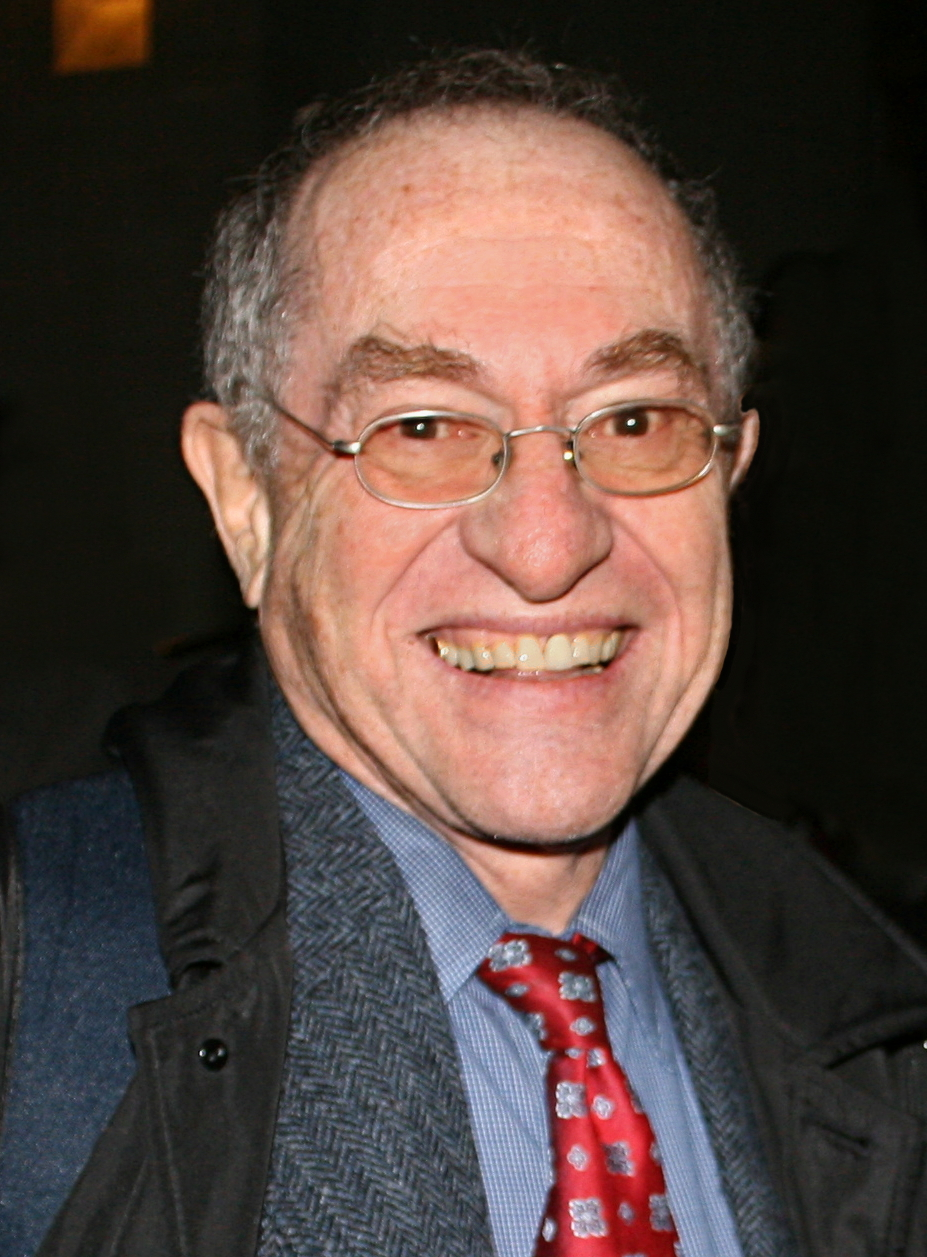
- Finkelstein in 2005 Dershowitz in 2009

Parties
| Norman Finkelstein | Alan Dershowitz |

Works
| Beyond Chutzpah (2005) | The Case for Israel (2003); The Case for Peace (2005) |

The Dershowitz–Finkelstein affair was a public controversy involving academics Alan Dershowitz and Norman Finkelstein and their scholarship on the Israeli–Palestinian conflict in 2005.

Shortly after the publication of The Case for Israel (2003) by Harvard Law School professor Alan Dershowitz, Norman Finkelstein alleged that it was "a collection of fraud, falsification, plagiarism and nonsense." Finkelstein further derided the book, remarking, "If Dershowitz's book were made of cloth, I wouldn't even use it as a schmatta ... his book is such garbage." Finkelstein charged that Dershowitz had engaged in plagiarism in his use of Joan Peters' book From Time Immemorial. Dershowitz denied the charges. Former Harvard president Derek Bok, following a review requested by then-Harvard Law School Dean Elena Kagan, stated that no plagiarism had occurred.

In Beyond Chutzpah: On the Misuse of Anti-Semitism and the Abuse of History, published by University of California Press on August 28, 2005, Finkelstein aimed to debunk The Case for Israel. Dershowitz had written letters to both The New Press and to the University of California Press to prevent its publication, claiming it contained massive libel and stating that the book should not be published. Dershowitz responded in his book The Case for Peace and alleged a campaign of vilification by Finkelstein against several pro-Israel academics.

== Finkelstein's criticisms of Dershowitz ==
The book Beyond Chutzpah is a critique of arguments used to defend Israel's stance in the Israel-Palestine conflict, including the use of the allegations of antisemitism to neutralize criticism of Israel. A major theme of the book is a comparison of Alan Dershowitz's earlier book, The Case for Israel, with the findings of mainstream human rights organisations, such as Human Rights Watch and Amnesty International. Finkelstein wrote that Dershowitz had lied, misrepresented and fabricated many of his points in order to protect Israel and hide its record of alleged human rights violations, while "the real issue is Israel's human rights record".

In addition, Finkelstein wrote that he had found plagiarism where Dershowitz reproduced the exact errors found in Peters's citation of original sources. He said this was evidence that Dershowitz did not check the original sources he cited, a claim that Dershowitz adamantly denied.

Finkelstein said he had located twenty instances within as many pages, in which Dershowitz used some of the same words from the same sources that Joan Peters had used, largely in the same order. In several paragraph-long quotations, the two books have ellipses in the same positions. Finkelstein wrote that, in one instance, Dershowitz refers to the same page number as Peters, although he is citing a different edition of the same source, in which the words appear on a different page. Finkelstein stated: "It is left to readers to decide whether Dershowitz committed plagiarism as defined by Harvard University—'passing off a source's information, ideas, or words as your own by omitting to cite them.' According to a book review of Beyond Chutzpah, written by Professor Michael C. Desch in The American Conservative, "Finkelstein does not accuse Dershowitz of the wholesale lifting of someone else's words, but he does make a very strong case that Dershowitz has violated the spirit, if not the exact letter, of Harvard's prohibitions of the first three forms of plagiarism."

During an interview of the two men by Amy Goodman on Democracy Now!, Finkelstein also said that Dershowitz may not have written, or even read, the book.

Dershowitz took a number of steps to stop publication of Beyond Chutzpah. His lawyers wrote letters to the University of California Press threatening a lawsuit if it published the book. Dershowitz also wrote to the Governor of California, Arnold Schwarzenegger, asking him to stop the book from being published. Schwarzenegger responded that "he is not inclined to otherwise exert influence in this case because of the clear, academic freedom issue it presents". According to Jon Weiner, writing in The Nation, Dershowitz' lawyers contacted the president of the University of California, the university provost, seventeen directors of the university press and nineteen members of the university press’s faculty editorial committee to attempt to stop the publication of the book.

== Dershowitz's response ==
Dershowitz threatened to bring a legal action against the University of California Press in response to the charges in Finkelstein's book. Dershowitz claimed to have written every word of The Case for Israel by hand and to have sent the University of California Press his handwritten manuscript. He says there is not a single phrase or sentence in it that was plagiarized, and accused Finkelstein of knowing this and making the charges in order to garner publicity. Dershowitz offered to produce his handwritten drafts (he does not type) to debunk the claim that The Case for Israel was ghostwritten and claimed Finkelstein has not asked to see them.

Dershowitz also asked California Governor Arnold Schwarzenegger to intervene in order to prevent the University of California Press from publishing the book. Schwarzenegger's legal advisor responded, however, that the governor would not intervene in issues of academic freedom.

As a result, when Beyond Chutzpah was published, it no longer used the word "plagiarize" in its argument that Dershowitz inappropriately borrowed from another work, nor did it include the claim that Dershowitz did not write The Case for Israel, because, the publisher said, "[Finkelstein] couldn't document that." "Dershowitz has said he cited sources properly, attempting to check all primary sources and citing Peters when she was his only source."

Dershowitz said that Finkelstein has invented false charges in order to discredit supporters of Israel: "The mode of attack is consistent. Chomsky selects the target and directs Finkelstein to probe the writings in minute detail and conclude that the writer didn't actually write the work, that it is plagiarized, that it is a hoax and a fraud," alleging that Finkelstein has leveled the same kind of charges against many others, calling at least 10 "distinguished Jews 'hucksters,' 'hoaxters,' 'thieves,' 'extortionists,' and worse."

Dershowitz's subsequent book on the Israeli-Palestinian conflict, The Case for Peace, contains a chapter rebutting Finkelstein's charges, which Dershowitz made available on his web site. Dershowitz also claimed that Finkelstein's mother was a kapo.

== Additional responses by Finkelstein and Dershowitz ==
Finkelstein argued in a letter to The Harvard Crimson published on October 3, 2003, that Dershowitz reproduced exactly two of Peters' mistakes, and made one relevant mistake of his own. In quoting Mark Twain, Finkelstein argued, "Dershowitz cites two paragraphs from Twain as continuous text, just as Peters cites them as continuous text, but in Twain's book the two paragraphs are separated by 87 pages." While still quoting Twain, although Dershowitz cited a different edition of Twain's Innocents Abroad than Joan Peters cites, Finkelstein continues, "the relevant quotes do not appear on these pages in the edition of Twain's book that Dershowitz cites." Finkelstein points out that these quotations do, however, appear on the pages that Joan Peters cites as her edition of Innocents Abroad. Finkelstein asserted: "Quoting a statement depicting the miserable fate of Jews in mid-19th century Jerusalem, Peters cites a British consular letter from 'Wm. T. Young to Viscount Canning.' Dershowitz cites the same statement as Peters, reporting that Young 'attributed the plight of the Jew in Jerusalem' to pervasive anti-Semitism. Turning to the original, however, we find that the relevant statement did not come from Young but, as is unmistakably clear to anyone who actually consulted the original, from an enclosed memorandum written by an 'A. Benisch' that Young was forwarding to Canning." He concluded: "It would be impossible for anyone who checked the original source[s] to make the[se] error[s]."

In response to the general charge of plagiarism, Dershowitz had characterized the excerpts as quotations that historians and scholars of the region cite routinely, such as Mark Twain and the reports of government commissions.

In "Statement of Alan M. Dershowitz" featured on a faculty webpage at Harvard Law School, Dershowitz writes:

I will no longer participate in this transparent ploy to gather media attention for Finkelstein and his publisher. I answer all of his charges fully in Chapter 16 of my forthcoming book The Case For Peace, to be published by Wiley in August. My book deals with important and current issues, such as the prospects for peace in the immediate future. Finkelstein's deals with the irrelevant past that both Israelis and Palestinians are trying to put behind them. Let the marketplace judge our books. As far as I'm concerned, the public controversy is over and I will comment no further on the false charges leveled by Finkelstein and the UCP. Let them henceforth pay for their own publicity, instead of trying to get it on the cheap by launching phony attacks against me. I will not debate Finkelstein. I have a longstanding policy against debating Holocaust deniers, revisionists, trivializers or minimizers. Nor is a serious debate about Israel possible with someone who acknowledges that he knows "very little" about that country. I will be happy to debate any legitimate experts from Amnesty International or any other human rights organization. Indeed, I have a debate scheduled with Noam Chomsky about these issues in the fall [2005].

Dershowitz strenuously denied that he did not credit Peters' book adequately in his own book, and Harvard University supported him in that position in exonerating him against Finkelstein's charges that he committed "plagiarism".

== $10,000 challenge ==
During the joint interview of Dershowitz and Finkelstein in a 2003 Democracy Now! broadcast, host Amy Goodman alluded to an appearance on MSNBC's Scarborough Country in which Dershowitz made a challenge to "give $10,000 to the PLO" (Palestine Liberation Organization), playing a clip from the other program. In the headnote to the transcript, Goodman wrote:

On MSNBC's Scarborough Country on September 8, 2003, renowned appellate lawyer, Harvard Law professor and author Alan Dershowitz says: "I will give $10,000 to the PLO... if you can find a historical fact in my book that you can prove to be false." The book Dershowitz refers to is his latest work The Case For Israel. Today author and professor Norman Finkelstein takes him on and charges that Dershowitz makes numerous factual errors in his book. Dershowitz denies the charges. Finkelstein teaches at DePaul University and is the author of four books including The Holocaust Industry: Reflections on the Exploitation of Jewish Suffering.

The segment of Democracy Now! appears in the included transcript of the program:

Amy Goodman: ...we were intrigued on watching Scarborough Country when you debated, the offer that you made [....] just play it for a moment.

Alan Dershowitz: Tell you what, I will give $10,000 to the P.L.O. in your name if you can find historical fact in my book that you can prove to be false. I issue that challenge, I issue it to you, I issue it to the Palestinian Authority, I issue it to Noam Chomsky to Edward Said, every word in my book is accurate and you can't just simply say it's false without documenting it. Tell me one thing in the book now that is false?

Amy Goodman: Okay. Let's go to the book. The Case for Israel $10,000.

On Democracy Now! Finkelstein replied to that specific challenge for material errors found in his book overall, and Dershowitz upped it to $25,000 for another particular "issue" that they disputed.

Finkelstein referred to "concrete facts which are not particularly controversial," stating that in The Case for Israel Dershowitz attributes to Israeli historian Benny Morris the figure of between 2,000 and 3,000 Palestinian Arabs who fled their homes from April to June 1948, when the range in the figures presented by Morris is actually 200,000 to 300,000.

Dershowitz responded to Finkelstein's reply by stating that such a mistake could not have been intentional, as it harmed his own side of the debate: "Obviously, the phrase '2,000 to 3,000 Arabs' refers either to a sub-phase [of the flight] or is a typographical error." In this particular context, Dershowitz's argument is that Palestinians left as a result of orders issued by Palestinian commanders: "If in fact, 200,000 were told to leave instead of 2,000, that strengthens my argument considerably."

== Others on the plagiarism controversy ==
=== Support for Finkelstein ===
In his review of Beyond Chutzpah, echoing Finkelstein's criticisms, Michael Desch, political science professor at University of Notre Dame observed:

Not only did Dershowitz improperly present Peters's ideas, he may not even have bothered to read the original sources she used to come up with them. Finkelstein somehow managed to get uncorrected page proofs of The Case for Israel in which Dershowitz appears to direct his research assistant to go to certain pages and notes in Peters's book and place them in his footnotes directly (32, col. 3).

Oxford academic Avi Shlaim had also been critical of Dershowitz, saying he believed that the charge of plagiarism "is proved in a manner that would stand up in court."

Los Angeles attorney Frank Menetrez concluded in an opinion piece that he can find "no way of avoiding the inference that Dershowitz copied the quotation from Twain from Peters' From Time Immemorial, and not from the original source," as Dershowitz claimed. Dershowitz has replied briefly to this charge, in an exchange with Menetrez. Menetrez has also said his belief that "neither Dershowitz nor Harvard, however, has identified the specific issues or arguments that Harvard allegedly investigated and rejected. In particular, neither of them has ever said whether Harvard investigated the identical errors issue."

In Desch's review of Beyond Chutzpah, summarizing Finkelstein's case against Dershowitz for "torturing the evidence," particularly Finkelstein's argument relating to Dershowitz's citations of Morris, Desch observed:

There are two problems with Dershowitz's heavy reliance on Morris. The first is that Morris is hardly the left-wing peacenik that Dershowitz makes him out to be, which means that calling him as a witness in Israel's defense is not very helpful to the case. The more important problem is that many of the points Dershowitz cites Morris as supporting—that the early Zionists wanted peaceful coexistence with the Arabs, that the Arabs began the 1948 War to destroy Israel, that the Arabs were guilty of many massacres while the Israelis were scrupulous about protecting human rights, and that the Arabs fled at the behest of their leaders rather than being ethnically cleansed by the Israel Defense Forces—turn out to be based on a partial reading or misreading of Morris's books. Finkelstein documents these charges in exhaustive detail in Appendix II of his book and the preponderance of evidence he provides is conclusive." (30–31)

=== Support for Dershowitz ===
As Desch acknowledges in his book review of Beyond Chutzpah, "In the wake of a number of similar complaints against Dershowitz and two of his Harvard Law School colleagues Laurence Tribe and Charles Ogletree, former Harvard President Derek Bok conducted an investigation—the details of which were not made public—that... vindicated Dershowitz" (32, col. 3).

== Dershowitz's involvement in Finkelstein's denial of tenure ==
In September 2006, Alan Dershowitz sent members of DePaul University's law and political science faculties what he described as "a dossier of Norman Finkelstein's most egregious academic sins, and especially his outright lies, misquotations, and distortions that... are not incidental to Finkelstein's purported scholarship; they are Finkelstein's purported scholarship," and he lobbied professors, alumni and administrators to deny Finkelstein tenure. DePaul's political science committee investigated the accusations against Finkelstein and concluded that they were not based on legitimate criticism. The department subsequently invited John Mearsheimer and Ian Lustick, two uninvolved academics with expertise on the Israel/Palestine conflict, to evaluate the academic merit of Finkelstein's work. Mearsheimer and Lustick came to the same conclusion. In April 2007 the De Paul University Liberal Arts and Sciences' Faculty Governance Council had voted unanimously to send a letter to Harvard University expressing "the council's dismay at Professor Dershowitz's interference in Finkelstein's tenure and promotion case."

In early 2007, the DePaul University Political Science department voted 9 to 3, and the College of Liberal Arts and Sciences Personnel Committee 5 to 0, in favor of giving Finkelstein tenure. The three opposing faculty members subsequently filed a minority report opposing tenure, supported by the Dean of the College, Chuck Suchar. Suchar stated he opposed tenure because Finkelstein's "personal and reputation demeaning attacks on Alan Dershowitz, Benny Morris, and the holocaust authors Eli Wiesel and Jerzy Kosinski" were inconsistent with DePaul's "Vincentian" values. In June 2007 a 4–3 vote by DePaul University's Board on Promotion and Tenure (a faculty board), affirmed by the university's president, the Rev. Dennis Holtschneider, denied Finkelstein tenure. Finkelstein was placed on administrative leave for the 2007–2008 academic year (the remainder of his contract with DePaul), his sole course having been cancelled. However, in announcing his decision, Holtschneider said the outside attention "was unwelcome and inappropriate and had no impact on either the process or the outcome of this case." On September 5, 2007, Finkelstein resigned after he and the university reached a settlement; they released a joint statement on the resolution of the conflict.

== Additional points of dispute between Finkelstein and Dershowitz ==
In The Holocaust Industry, Finkelstein questioned Elie Wiesel's claim to have read Immanuel Kant's Critique of Pure Reason in Yiddish. According to Finkelstein, no translation of the work existed in Yiddish at the time. Dershowitz responded that this was not so: he alleged that one had been published in Warsaw in 1929, and said that he had seen a copy at the Harvard Library. Finkelstein described this latter claim as false and inept, writing that the only work by Kant in Yiddish owned by the library was a partial translation of the Critique of Practical Reason, a completely different work than the one referred to by Wiesel and Dershowitz.

During a clash with members of J Street at the 2010 American Israel Public Affairs Committee conference, Dershowitz chastised J Street for pandering to anti-Israel activists and asked, "Why are you so popular with Norman Finkelstein?" Both J Street and Finkelstein rebuffed Dershowitz's claim.
