= Six Days of War =

2002 non-fiction book

Six Days of War: June 1967 and the Making of the Modern Middle East
- First edition cover
- Author: Michael Oren
- Language: English
- Subject: Six-Day War
- Publisher: Oxford University Press
- Publication date: April 18, 2002
- Publication place: United States
- Media type: Print (hardcover, paperback)
- Pages: 480
- ISBN: 978-0-19-515174-9
- Dewey Decimal: 956.04/6 21
- LC Class: DS127 .O74 2002

Six Days of War: June 1967 and the Making of the Modern Middle East is a 2002 non-fiction book by American-born Israeli historian and Israeli ambassador to the United States, Michael Oren, chronicling the events of the Six-Day War fought between Israel and its Arab neighbors. Widely praised by critics, the book won the Los Angeles Times Book Prize for history and spent seven weeks on the New York Times Best Seller list.

A Hebrew translation of Six Days of War was made available in June 2007.

== Content ==
=== Causes of the war ===
Oren emphasizes that war was intended by neither side, rather, as with the July Crisis starting World War I, war resulted from an escalating series of events, some of them purely accidental. For example, in November 1966 three Israeli policemen were killed when they drove over a mine presumed to have been left by Palestinian fedayeen operating from Jordan (though likely sponsored by Syria). For unclear reasons, the usually efficient U.S. Ambassador to Israel Walworth Barbour allowed several days to pass before transmitting a condolence message from Jordan's King Hussein to Israeli Prime Minister Levi Eshkol. In the absence of a condolence message Israel retaliated, reasoning that although the Jordanian state was not behind the attack, the people of Jordan had offered shelter to the attackers — this became one of the series of episodes that led to war. Another example was the decision of the Israelis to refrain from parading armour in their 1967 Independence Day parade in Jerusalem: although this was designed to lessen tension as Jerusalem was divided by the 1949 armistice, it was actually interpreted as a sign that the Israelis were concentrating their armour for an invasion of Syria.

=== Why Israel Won ===
Arab leaders and commanders were locked in a battle with one another to prove their militancy and outdo each other in their hatred of Israel: in the case of the Ba'athist leadership of Syria, Oren argues that war was central to their ideology, while for the Egyptians bellicose rhetoric over Israel was an attempt to gain pan-Arab leadership — even though Egypt did not want a war. Inside Egypt the leadership was dangerously split, with different factions using anti-Israeli rhetoric as a way of faction fighting inside the regime. As a result, there was no effective way for the Arabs as a whole to use their numerical superiority in a multi-front war while the armed forces of the largest Arab state were caught between confusing orders and strategies. The Israelis worked hard, planning meticulously for the possibility of war with an army that drilled diligently. By contrast, one Syrian general predicted total defeat of Israel in four days "at most." President Gamal Abdel Nasser of Egypt insisted that the Israeli Air Force was incapable of attacking Egyptian Air Force bases — in fact the successful Israeli attack on Egyptian air fields was a key factor in Israel's victory. One Egyptian official described his country's leadership as believing that "the destruction of Israel was a child's game that only required the hooking up of a few telephone lines at the commander's house and the writing of victory slogans."

== Reception ==
The book was widely praised by critics and won the Los Angeles Times Book Prize for History. It spent seven weeks on the New York Times bestseller list. The New York Times Book Review wrote positively of Six Days of War, as did the Washington Post which calls it "not only the best book so far written on the Six Day War, it is likely to remain the best." Writing in Atlantic Monthly, Benjamin Schwarz called it a "masterly book" and that "[Oren's] achievement as a writer and a historian is awesome." Avi Shlaim in gave the book a positive review in The Guardian, calling it "the most detailed, the most comprehensive and by far the best-documented history that we have on this short but fateful war". It was also reviewed in Newsweek International and The Economist.

Tony Judt wrote a review in the New Republic - republished in a following book. Judt praised the book for focusing on the international area during the conflict, specifically the superpowers of the US and USSR, as well as his focus on specific Israeli personalities (Rabin, Allon, Eshkol, and Sharon). However, Judt suggested that Oren "may be out of his depth" in topics further away from Israel. For example, Judt argued that France in 1956 did not conspire with Israel because Prime Minister Guy Mollet shared the Israeli's government socialist values, pointing out that this did not explain why Britain's Conservative government joined them at the Protocol of Sèvres. He also argued that it was President Eisenhower, not Bulganin, who ended the Suez Crisis. More seriously, he argued that the book was not novel in any way, contrary to Oren's intentions for the history to "never be looked at the same way again." as well criticizing it for not engaging with the long term consequences of the war. Oren responded to Judt's review in the New Republic.

Norman Finkelstein wrote a critical review, calling Six Days of War an "apologetic narrative" in which Oren "basically reiterates the official Israeli version of the June war."

== Awards ==
- National Jewish Book Awards for Jewish Book of the Year in 2002–2003

== Reviews ==
- Cohen, Eliot A. (2002). "Review of Six Days of War: June 1967 and the Making of the Modern Middle East". Foreign Affairs. 81 (5): 202–202. doi:10.2307/20033294. ISSN 0015-7120.
- Finkelstein, Norman G. (2003). "Appendix: Abba Eban with Footnotes: A Critical Review of Michael Oren's Six Days of War: June 1967 and the Making of the Modern Middle East". Image and Reality of the Israel-Palestine Conflict (2nd ed.). Verso Books.
- Hitchens, Ralph M. (2003). "Review of Six Days of War: June 1967 and the Making of the Modern Middle East". The Journal of Military History. 67 (1): 297–299. ISSN 0899-3718.
- Kyle, Keith (2003). "Review of Six Days of War: June 1967 and the Making of the Modern Middle East". International Affairs. 79 (1): 216–217. ISSN 0020-5850.
- Meital, Yoram (2004). "Review of Six Days of War: June 1967 and the Making of the Modern Middle East". Shofar. 22 (4): 179–181. ISSN 0882-8539.
- Parker, Richard B. (2005). "Review of Six Days of War: June 1967 and the Making of the Modern Middle East". Israel Studies Forum. 20 (1): 92–94. ISSN 1557-2455.
- Petersen, Tore Tingvold (2003). "How Not to Stand up to Arabs and Israelis". The International History Review. 25 (3): 616–635. ISSN 0707-5332.
- Quandt, William B. (2004). "Review of Six Days of War: June 1967 and the Making of the Modern Middle East". Journal of Cold War Studies. 6 (3): 145–148. doi:10.2307/26925401. ISSN 1520-3972.
- Rubner, Michael (December 2002). "Book Reviews: Six Days of War: June 1967 and the Making of the Modern Middle East". Middle East Policy. 9 (4): 172–176. ISSN 1061-1924.
- Slater, Jerome (2003). "Review of Six Days of War: June 1967 and the Making of the Modern Middle East". Political Science Quarterly. 118 (2): 363–364. ISSN 0032-3195.
