= Ronald Sanders =

Ronald Sanders may refer to:

- Ronald Sanders (film editor), Canadian film editor and television producer
- Ronald Sanders (diplomat) (born 1948), Antiguan Barbudan academic, diplomat and journalist
- Ronald Sanders (writer) (1932–1991), American journalist and writer

== See also ==
- Ron Saunders (1932–2019), English football player and manager
- Ron Saunders (politician), American politician
- Ron Saunders (producer), Australian film and television producer, writer and director
