= Democracy Now! =

American TV, radio, and internet news program

- Genre: News program, current affairs
- Running time: 60 minutes daily (Monday thru Friday)
- Home station: WBAI
- Syndicates: Pacifica Radio (radio); WestLink (television)
- Hosted by: Amy Goodman (principal host); Juan González (frequent co-host); Nermeen Shaikh (frequent co-host)
- Produced by: Mike Burke
- Executive producer: Amy Goodman
- Recording studio: New York City
- Original release: February 19, 1996; 30 years ago – present
- Audio format: Stereophonic sound
- Opening theme: "Need to Know" by Incognito
- Ending theme: "Kid You'll Move Mountains" by Manitoba
- Website: www.democracynow.org

Democracy Now! is an hour-long independent American television, radio, and Internet news program based in Manhattan and hosted by journalists Amy Goodman (who also acts as the show's executive producer), Juan González, and Nermeen Shaikh. The show, which airs live each weekday at 8 a.m. Eastern Time, is broadcast on the Internet and via more than 1,400 radio and television stations worldwide.

The program combines news reporting, interviews, investigative journalism and political commentary from a progressive perspective. It documents social movements, struggles for justice, activism challenging corporate power and operates as a watchdog outfit regarding the effects of American foreign policy. Democracy Now! views its aim as one providing activists and the citizenry a platform to debate people from "the establishment". The show is described as progressive by fans as well as critics, but Goodman rejects that label, calling the program a global newscast that has "people speaking for themselves". Democracy Now! describes its staff as "includ[ing] some of this country's leading progressive journalists."

Democracy Now Productions, the independent media nonprofit organization that produces Democracy Now!, is funded entirely through contributions from listeners, viewers, and foundations such as the Park Foundation, Ford Foundation, Lannan Foundation, and the J.M. Kaplan Fund. It has over $36 million in assets and about a $10 million annual budget. Democracy Now! does not accept advertisers, corporate underwriting or government funding. The show has become popular on the internet, and from the late 2010s onward, has been involved in pioneering extensive media cooperation in the public sphere across the US.

== Background ==
The Democracy Now! audio podcast cover artwork

Democracy Now!, also called Democracy Now! The War and Peace Report, Democracy Now Independent Global News, or Democracy News, was founded on February 19, 1996, at WBAI in New York City by journalists Amy Goodman, Juan González, Larry Bensky, Salim Muwakkil, and Julie Drizin. It originally aired on five Pacifica Radio stations. Goodman is the program's principal host, with Juan González and Nermeen Shaikh as frequent co-hosts. Jeremy Scahill, an investigative reporter and co-founding editor for The Intercept and Drop Site News, has been a frequent contributor since 1997.

The show covered the Seattle protests (1999) targeting the World Trade Organization.

Democracy Now! partnered with Free Speech TV (FSTV) and Deep Dish Television to cover the 2000 Democratic National Convention. The event marked a turning point for Democracy Now!, as in addition to its presence on radio, it became a television show. From then onward, Democracy Now! has had their content promoted and broadcast on FSTV.

Democracy Now! began broadcasting on television every weekday shortly after September 11, 2001, and is the only public medium in the U.S. that airs simultaneously on satellite and cable television, radio, and the internet.

Democracy Now! has been critical of the Trans-Pacific Partnership (TPP) trade deal. After data disclosures by the whistleblower organization WikiLeaks regarding the TPP in 2010, Democracy Now! has given a significant media platform and extensively covered them since, and like some other news networks cooperated with its leader Julian Assange. Coverage of WikiLeaks by Democracy Now! was sympathetic.

In 2011, reporter Sharif Abdel Kouddous covered the Egyptian revolution for Democracy Now!.

On February 19, 2016, Democracy Now! marked 20 years on the air with an hour-long retrospective look back at "two decades of independent, unembedded news", with highlights chosen from over 5,000 episodes. Amy Goodman also published a book entitled Democracy Now!: 20 Years Covering the Movements Changing America, and launched a 100-city tour across the United States to mark the 20th anniversary of Democracy Now!, with scheduled broadcasts of the show recorded during her travels.

=== Studios ===
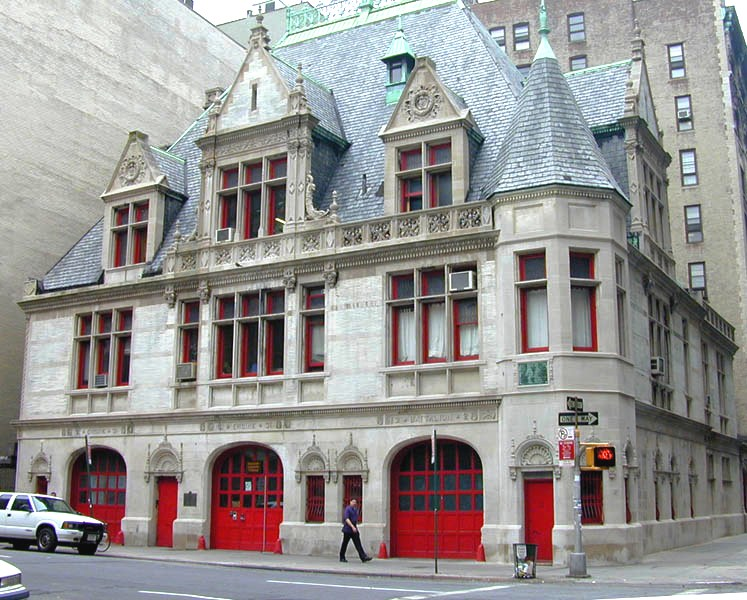
From 2001 to 2009, the show was located in the DCTV firehouse building (a converted firehouse) in New York City's Chinatown.

Democracy Now! began as a radio program broadcast from the studios of WBAI, a local Pacifica Radio station in New York City. In early September 2001, amid a months-long debate over the mission and management of Pacifica, Democracy Now! was forced out of the WBAI studios. Goodman took the program to the Downtown Community Television Center located in a converted firehouse building in New York City's Chinatown, where the program began to be televised. Only a few days later on September 11, 2001 Democracy Now! was the closest national broadcast to Ground Zero. On that day Goodman and colleagues continued reporting beyond their scheduled hour-long time slot in what became an eight-hour marathon broadcast. Following 9/11, in addition to radio and television, Democracy Now! expanded their multimedia reach to include cable, satellite radio, Internet, and podcasts.

In November 2009, Democracy Now! left their broadcast studio in the converted DCTV firehouse, where they had broadcast for eight years, and moved to a repurposed graphic arts building in the Chelsea neighborhood of Manhattan. In 2010, the new 8,500-square-foot Democracy Now! studio became the first radio or television studio in the nation to receive LEED Platinum certification, the highest rating awarded by the U.S. Green Building Council.

=== Syndication ===
Democracy Now! is the flagship program of the Pacifica Radio network. It also airs on several NPR member stations. The television simulcast airs on public-access television and several PBS stations; by satellite on Free Speech TV, and free-to-air on C Band. Democracy Now! is also available on the Internet as downloadable and streaming audio and video. In total, nearly 1,400 television and radio stations broadcast Democracy Now! worldwide.

== Awards and reception ==
I think it's probably the most significant progressive news institution that has come around in some time.

— Robert W. McChesney, quoted in The Nation

Democracy Now! and its staff have received several journalism awards, including the Gracie Award from American Women in Radio & Television; the George Polk Award for its 1998 radio documentary Drilling and Killing: Chevron and Nigeria's Oil Dictatorship, on the Chevron Corporation and the deaths of two Nigerian villagers protesting an oil spill; and Goodman with Allan Nairn won Robert F. Kennedy Memorial's First Prize in International Radio for their 1993 report, Massacre: The Story of East Timor, which involved first-hand coverage of genocide during the Indonesian occupation of East Timor.

On October 1, 2008, Goodman was named as a recipient of the 2008 Right Livelihood Award, in connection with her years of work establishing Democracy Now! and in 2009, she, like her frequent guest Glenn Greenwald, was awarded the first annual Izzy Award (named after journalist I. F. "Izzy" Stone) for "special achievement in independent media". Her co-host Juan González was inducted into the New York chapter of the Society of Professional Journalists' Hall of Fame on November 19, 2015.

== 2008 Republican National Convention arrests ==
Three journalists with Democracy Now!—including principal host Amy Goodman, and news producers Nicole Salazar and Sharif Abdel Kouddous—were detained by police during their reporting on the 2008 Republican National Convention protests in Saint Paul, Minnesota. Salazar was filming as officers in full riot gear charged her area. As she yelled "Press!" she was knocked down and told to put her face in the ground while another officer dragged her backward by her leg across the pavement. The video footage of the incident was immediately posted on the Internet, leading to a large public outcry against her arrest. When a second producer, Kouddous, approached, he too was arrested, and charged with a felony. According to a press release by Democracy Now!, Goodman herself was arrested after confronting officers regarding the arrest of her colleagues. The officers had established a line of "crowd control", and ordered Goodman to move back. Goodman claims she was arrested after being pulled through the police line by an officer, and subsequently (as well as Kouddous) had her press credentials for the convention physically stripped from her by a Secret Service agent. All were held on charges of "probable cause for riot". A statement was later released by the city announcing that all "misdemeanor charges for presence at an unlawful assembly for journalists" would be dropped. The felony charges against Salazar and Kouddous were also dropped.

Goodman, Salazar, and Kouddous subsequently filed a lawsuit against the cities of St. Paul and Minneapolis as well as other defendants. According to Baher Asmy of the Center for Constitutional Rights, "[a]ll three plaintiffs that are journalists with Democracy Now reached a final settlement with the city of Minneapolis and St. Paul, and the United States Secret Service, that will resolve the claims that they had against them from unlawful and quite violent arrests." The settlement included $100,000 in compensation and a promise of police training.

== 2016 North Dakota access pipeline protests ==
In September 2016, an arrest warrant for criminal trespass was issued for Amy Goodman after covering the Dakota Access Pipeline protests, during which guards unleashed dogs and pepper spray on protesters in Morton County, North Dakota. An arrest warrant was reportedly also issued for Green Party presidential candidate Jill Stein and her running mate, Ajamu Baraka.

Goodman elected to turn herself in. Three days before the court date, the charges were increased to engaging in a riot, which carried a penalty of up to 30 days in jail and a $1,500 fine. On October 17, 2016, the judge quickly dismissed the charges, but Morton County prosecutors insisted the case was still open and they may pursue further charges in the future. Goodman asserted the importance of freedom of the press and said that Democracy Now! would continue covering the developing situation in North Dakota.

== Notable guests, interviews, and on-air debates ==
Guest(s)	First Appearance(s)	Episode or Guest Notoriety
Mumia Abu-Jamal	February 24, 1997	In its first year, Democracy Now! was one of the first national programs to air radio commentaries from the controversial journalist and former Black Panther Party member, on death row in Pennsylvania for the murder of a Philadelphia police officer. The 1997 decision to air Abu-Jamal's commentaries caused Democracy Now! to lose twelve of its then 36 affiliates.
Tariq Ali, Christopher Hitchens	December 4, 2003	Took opposing sides in two debates over the Iraq War, on December 4, 2003, and October 12, 2004.
Noam Chomsky	July 11, 1996	A regularly interviewed guest; MIT linguistics professor, political analyst, and author.
President Bill Clinton	November 8, 2000	When Clinton called WBAI on Election Day 2000 for a quick get-out-the-vote message, Goodman and WBAI's Gonzalo Aburto challenged him for 28 minutes with human rights questions about Leonard Peltier, racial profiling, the Iraq sanctions, Ralph Nader, the death penalty, the North American Free Trade Agreement (NAFTA), the normalization of relations with Cuba, and the Israeli–Palestinian conflict. Clinton defended his administration's policies and charged Goodman with being "hostile and combative".
Angela Davis	October 12, 2010	Interviewed various times on the show, Davis is a prison abolitionist, communist, and scholar. Davis' interviews have featured topics such as the prison industrial complex, Palestine and the Boycott, Divestment, Sanctions movement, US politics and the demonetization of radicals, and her past activism. She was also interviewed in the summer of 2020 during the George Floyd uprisings, speaking on the political moment and spread of abolitionist ideas.
Alan Dershowitz, Norman G. Finkelstein	September 24, 2003	Finkelstein is a frequent guest. This was a much publicized debate about whether the Dershowitz book, The Case for Israel was plagiarized and inaccurate. Dershowitz has written that he agreed to appear on the show after being told he would debate Noam Chomsky, not Finkelstein. See also: Dershowitz–Finkelstein affair.
Naomi Klein	June 13, 1997	Author, public intellectual, and critic of globalization and corporate capitalism. Notable interview on March 9, 2011.
Winona LaDuke	September 4, 1996	Ojibwe activist and former Green Vice Presidential Candidate.
Ralph Nader	June 14, 1996	A regularly interviewed guest; consumer activist, corporate critic, author, and former presidential candidate.
Robert Reich, Chris Hedges	July 26, 2016	Clinton Administration Secretary of Labor Robert Reich and Pulitzer-winning investigative journalist Chris Hedges debated on the role of Bernie Sanders supporters after Hillary Clinton won the 2016 Democratic nomination for president of the United States. Reich encouraged progressives to unite the party behind Clinton (as Sanders had already endorsed her), while Hedges endorsed Jill Stein of the Green Party of the United States, denouncing the "lesser of two evils" approach.
Arundhati Roy	December 15, 2008	Recurring guest; Indian writer, anti-war activist, and leading figure in the alter-globalization movement.
Kshama Sawant	January 6, 2014	Seattle City Council member and member of Socialist Alternative, who made history in 2013 by becoming the first independent socialist to win election in Seattle for nearly 100 years. A frequent guest, including after her successful re-election campaign in November 2019.
Joseph Stiglitz	June 6, 2012	Recurring guest; Nobel Laureate economist; former Chief Economist of the World Bank; Chief Economist at the Roosevelt Institute
Studs Terkel	November 27, 2008	Another radio broadcaster who collected stories from everyday people.
Roger Waters	December 30, 2009	English singer, songwriter, multi-instrumentalist, and composer who co-founded Pink Floyd.
Edward Snowden	June 10, 2013	American whistleblower who revealed unlawful mass surveillance carried out by the US government while working as a contractor.
Katharine Gun	July 19, 2019	British whistleblower whose attempts to expose lies about the Iraq invasion was called "the most important and courageous leak" in history.
Greta Thunberg	September 10, 2019	Swedish climate activist who sailed from Europe to America.
Paul Krugman, Richard D. Wolff	February 24, 2020	Debate about the strategies of the Bernie Sanders 2020 presidential campaign and socialism. Both Krugman and Wolff, a New Keynesian and Marxian economist respectively, expressed support for Sanders' campaign and social welfare policies; Krugman argued for appealing to social democracy and Wolff for socialism.
Leonard Peltier	September 19, 2025	Indigenous activist and political prisoner who was involved in the Wounded Knee Occupation who had his life sentence commuted to house arrest in his home at the Turtle Mountain Nation.
Zohran Mamdani	September 29, 2025	Member of the New York State Assembly, mayoral candidate in the 2025 New York City mayoral election, and member of the Democratic Socialists of America. Mamdani has been a regular guest since 2021.

Democracy Now! has featured appearances from Green Party candidate Jill Stein during the 2016 United States presidential election.

== Listenership ==
According to a 2016–17 Quantcast survey, "democracynow.org reaches over 395K U.S. monthly people".

== 30th anniversary event ==
On March 23, 2026, Democracy Now! held their 30th anniversary event at Riverside Church in New York where Bruce Springsteen, Patti Smith, Michael Stipe and others performed. Springsteen performed his song "Streets of Minneapolis" and joined the other performers for a performance of Smith's "People Have the Power". The entire event was livestreamed.

== See also ==
- Citizen journalism
- Citizen media
- Community radio
- Independent media
- Independent Media Center
- Mass media
- Media democracy
- Steal This Story, Please!
- Underground press
