= Mike Burke (journalist) =

American journalist

Mike Burke is an American journalist and senior producer of Democracy Now!, an independent global news program broadcast daily on radio, television, and the Internet. He also co-founded The Indypendent, a monthly newspaper based in New York City, which describes itself as being focused on social and economic justice.

== 2012 Republican National Convention incident ==
During the 2012 Republican National Convention, Burke attempted to interview GOP donor Sheldon Adelson and was interrupted by someone who grabbed his video camera. This individual ended up taking the video camera into a private suite and proceeded to throw it to the ground. The individual was later identified as Adelson's daughter. She accused Burke of hitting her but later came out and apologized. The incident was caught on a video camera shortly after Burke began to question other Republican donors. Burke later filed a report on the incident.
