= James Cobban =

Sir James Cobban CBE TD DL
- Born: James Macdonald Cobban; 14 September 1910; Scunthorpe, Lincolnshire, England
- Died: 19 April 1999 (aged 88); Yeovil, Somerset, England
- Occupations: Teacher and lay leader
- Known for: Headmaster of Abingdon School
- Spouse: Lorna Mary Marlow (1913–1961)
- Children: Helena Cobban

Sir James Macdonald Cobban CBE TD DL (14 September 1910 – 19 April 1999) was an English educator and headmaster, as well as a prominent lay leader in the Church of England. He was the headmaster of Abingdon School from 1947 to 1970 and is largely credited with bringing the school from relative obscurity to national recognition in Britain.

== Biography ==
Cobban was born in Scunthorpe, Lincolnshire, and received his early education at Pocklington School in Yorkshire. He was granted a scholarship to Jesus College, Cambridge, where he read classics and had great success. Cobban received a double first in the Classical Tripos examinations, receiving the Thirwell Medal and Gladstone Prize and receiving marks second only to his contemporary Enoch Powell. Cobban continued his education at the University of Vienna in 1932, where he witnessed a Jewish student being chased by a gang of young Nazis wielding cudgels, an experience which Cobban described in his memoir as "seared in my mind".

In 1933 Cobban took a position teaching Latin and Greek at King Edward VI School, Southampton. Whilst there, he wrote a Latin reader, "Civis Romanus", which was widely used in the latter half of the 20th century, selling over half a million copies. In 1936, he took a post at Dulwich College, where he worked until the outbreak of the Second World War. During the war, Cobban served with the Directorate of Military Intelligence and rose to the rank of Lieutenant-Colonel. An attack of appendicitis during the run-up to D-Day prevented his participation in the Normandy invasion, and he arrived in France six days after the Allied landing. Many of Cobban's responsibilities before and after the invasion involved planning for the occupation of Germany. When that became a reality, Cobban was assigned to help organise local governments in Germany on a democratic basis. In his memoir, he fondly recalls working alongside German civil servants, occasionally using Latin as a common tongue when his German and their English failed.

Cobban briefly returned to Dulwich in 1946 before arriving at Abingdon School as Headmaster in 1947.

== Marriage and children ==
Cobban married Lorna Marlow in 1942 and had four daughters (Mary, Diana, Hilary, and Helena) and one son (John, who died at the age of two from a fall). Lorna died of bronchiectasis in 1961, leaving James to raise his four daughters on his own, although his sister Katie later gave up her own career as an educator to assist in the children's care.

== Religious views ==
Cobban was a lifelong member of the Church of England and in later life a prominent lay leader. He served in the General Synod for fifteen years, and for three years served as its chairman, the highest position a layman can hold in the Church of England. Cobban preached and officiated in his retirement at a group of six parishes in Dorset from 1986 to 1997.

In the epigraph of his memoir One Small Head he wrote, "I may not be a very good Christian, but I cannot imagine any life without the Christian church."

== Retirement ==
He moved to Steventon, then to Sherborne, and finally to sheltered housing run by one of his daughters in Yeovil. He died at Tyndale Nursing Home, Yeovil, Somerset, on 19 April 1999, and his ashes were interred on 26 April in Trent churchyard, Somerset.

== Honours ==
James Cobban received the Territorial Decoration (TD) for long service in the Territorial Army.

- He was appointed as a Commander of the Order of the British Empire (CBE) in the Civil Division in the 1971 Queen's Birthday Honours List.
- He was knighted in the 1982 New Years Honours List.
- He served as a Deputy Lieutenant (DL) for both Berkshire and Oxfordshire.

== Works ==
- Civis Romanus, a collection of readings for beginning students of Latin co-written with Ronald Colebourn, continuously in print from 1936–1986 and recently reprinted. ISBN 0-86516-569-6.
- Senate & Provinces, 78 - 49 B.B., (Cambridge University Press, 1935). Now out-of-print.
- One Small Head, privately printed memoir, 1998. Now out-of-print.
