= Helena Cobban =

British journalist (born 1952)

- Born: 1952 (age 73–74); Abingdon, Oxfordshire, England
- Occupations: Journalist, author
- Spouse: William B. Quandt
- Relatives: James Cobban (father); Lorna Mary Cobban (mother)
- Writing career
- Genres: Non-fiction, politics, journalism

Helena Cobban (born 1952) is a British-American writer and researcher on international relations, with special interests in the Middle East, the international system, and transitional justice. She is a non-resident senior fellow at the Washington D.C.–based Center for International Policy. She is the founder and CEO of the book-publishing company Just World Books and the executive president of the educational non-profit organization Just World Educational. Having contributed throughout her career to numerous media outlets and authored seven books, she resumed her writing career in 2019.

== Life ==
Born in Abingdon, England, in 1952 to Sir James Macdonald Cobban, a prominent lay leader in the Church of England, and Lorna Mary Cobban, she was educated at Queen Anne's School, Caversham and St Hugh's College, Oxford, where she received her BA (Hons) in Philosophy and Economics in 1973. She was awarded an MA from Oxford in 1981.

From 1974 through 1981, she worked as a Beirut-based correspondent for news outlets including The Christian Science Monitor, Middle East International, The Sunday Times, ABC News, and the BBC.

In 1982, she moved to the United States to take-up a research fellowship at the Harvard University Center for International Affairs, where she wrote her first book, The Palestinian Liberation Organisation. It was published in English in 1984, was translated into Arabic and several other languages, and remains in print.

Since then, she has published six additional books: three others on questions of Middle East war and peace, and three on other international issues. Her seventh book, Re-engage! American and the World After Bush was published in 2008. Rep. Lee H. Hamilton, Co-chair of the Iraq Study Group, described it as, "An impassioned, thought-provoking, and accessible brief from a highly esteemed journalist on how all of us, as individuals, can act to help better our country and world." She has also contributed chapters to around 20 scholarly books edited by others.

From 1991 to 1993, she was Co-Director of the Middle East project at Search for Common Ground, in Washington, DC.

From 1990 through 2007, Cobban contributed a regular column on global issues to The Christian Science Monitor, and from 1993 through 2006 she contributed a separate column to the Arabic-language international daily Al-Hayat.

In February 2003, she started publishing "Just World News", a blog on global issues that has gained a broad international readership and has been cited in Le Monde diplomatique and elsewhere. She is a Contributing Editor at Boston Review, where she has published essays on Palestinian-Israeli issues, Iraq, and post-conflict justice questions. In the late 2000s she briefly contributed a weekly news analysis on Middle East developments to Inter Press Service and made periodic contributions to ForeignPolicy.com and The Christian Science Monitor.

In March 2010, she founded Just World Books. Over the eight years that followed, the company published 38 original titles on Middle Eastern and other international issues. In early 2018, the company entered a hiatus from issuing new titles though it keeps the existing titles in print and sells subsidiary rights for them. Cobban then spent more time running Just World Educational, which she served as Executive President. In Spring 2019, she resumed her writing career.

She is a member of Charlottesville Friends Meeting in Charlottesville, Virginia. Cobban used to be a member of the International Institute for Strategic Studies, and formerly sat on the Middle East Advisory Committee of Human Rights Watch. In 2007–08 she was a "Friend in Washington" with the Friends Committee on National Legislation.

She is married to William B. Quandt, who is the Edward R. Stettinius, Jr., Professor of Politics at the University of Virginia.

== Contributions to Middle East studies ==
Through her reporting and analytical work, Cobban has made notable contributions to the study of Palestinian politics, Israeli-Palestinian peacemaking, Lebanese politics, Israeli-Syrian peacemaking, the US war in Iraq, and the broader study of the Middle East.

=== Palestinian politics ===
For her 1984 book The Palestinian Liberation Organisation: People, Power, and Politics she interviewed many founders and leaders of the PLO and used much original material gathered during her reporting work in Beirut in the late 1970s. In the book, she concluded that the center of gravity of the Palestinian national movement was shifting toward those Palestinians living inside their homeland, a diagnosis that proved correct when the First Intifada broke out in 1987. The book was heavily criticised in a review that Daniel Pipes wrote for the Washington Post.

Between 1984 and 2000, Cobban published numerous articles and book chapters on Palestinian political developments. Since 2001 she has published several lengthy essays on the topic in Boston Review, including two essays on Hamas that drew on original interview material with Hamas leaders, including Khaled Meshaal and Ismail Haniyeh.

In June 2009, she conducted another interview with Meshaal, in which he said, "I have said I accept a Palestinian state if Israel withdraws to the pre-1967 line. That doesn't annul the historical fact of the Israeli occupation of 1948, but Hamas and the other factions have all accepted this solution of a Palestinian state at the 1967 line."

=== Israeli–Palestinian peacemaking ===
She has authored numerous articles, book chapters, and blog posts about issues in this field, arguing in particular that the United States and other sponsors of the peace diplomacy should aim rapidly at securing a final peace agreement rather than losing time and political capital chasing interim deals. This has involved challenging the reliance on pre-agreement confidence-building measures as championed by Dennis Ross and others.

Cobban has helped to lead, or participated in, several Track II diplomacy programs between Israelis and Palestinians and has developed some nuanced assessments of the potential benefits and pitfalls of such efforts. In 2009 and 2010 she served as Executive Director of the Council for the National Interest.

=== Lebanese politics ===
In her 1985 book The Making of Modern Lebanon she analysed Lebanese politics as being the result of complex interactions among the country's different population groups, which she divided—based on an analysis by Fuad Khuri —into "sects" and "minorities." The book, which also built on considerable on-the-ground reporting, identified and analysed the rise of the country's previously marginalised Shiite community. She made numerous reporting trips back to Lebanon after 1999, and has published two notable articles about the rise of Hezbollah.

=== Syrian–Israeli peacemaking ===
Her 1991 book The superpowers and the Syrian-Israeli conflict tracked the entanglement of the Syrian–Israeli relationship in broader Cold War concerns. Zbigniew Brzezinski described it as a "perceptive and cool dissection of a truly complex issue." In a 1997 monograph, she started to look at the surprisingly fruitful peace diplomacy that had taken place on this track since the 1991 Madrid Conference. She expanded on that work in her 2000 book, described by Raymond Hinnebusch as "A must-read for anyone with interest in the Middle East or the dynamics of peace negotiations in general."

== Contributions to transitional justice studies ==
Cobban's 2006 book Amnesty after Atrocity?: Healing Nations after Genocide and War Crimes studied the outcomes—according to a broad range of social indicators—of the very different policy choices that by South Africa, Rwanda, and Mozambique made in the early to mid-1990s, as they attempted to deal with the tragic legacies of atrocities committed during earlier period of civil war and mass violence. This was one of the first attempts to adopt an essentially utilitarian approach to the challenge of transitional justice, a topic that had been approached by most earlier researchers in a more strictly deontological way.

One of her most notable findings was that the average cost of trying a perpetrator at the ICTR was $42.3 million, while the average cost of processing each accused atrocity perpetrator in South Africa's Truth and Reconciliation Commission was $4,290 and the cost of demobilising and reintegrating into society each former fighter from the civil wars in South Africa and Mozambique—many of whom had committed atrocities—was under $1,100.

During and after her work on the book, she conducted interviews and documentary research in the three countries studied; at the International Criminal Tribunal for Rwanda, the International Criminal Tribunal for former Yugoslavia; and in Northern Uganda. She published field notes and reflective essays from most of these trips on her Just World News blog and on the specially created Transitional Justice Forum blog.

== See also ==
- List of peace activists

== Books ==
- The Palestinian Liberation Organisation: People, Power, and Politics, Cambridge University Press, 1984
- The Making of Modern Lebanon, London: Hutchinson, and Boulder, Co: Westview, 1985
- The Superpowers and the Syrian-Israeli Conflict, Praeger, 1991
- The Moral Architecture of World Peace: Nobel Laureates Discuss our Global Future, University Press of Virginia, 2000
- The Israeli-Syrian Peace Talks: 1991–96 and Beyond , US Institute of Peace, 2000
- Amnesty after Atrocity?: Healing Nations after Genocide and War Crimes, Paradigm, 2006
- Re-engage! American and the World After Bush, Paradigm, 2008.

with other authors

- Abrams, Irwin; Wang Gungwu, eds. (2003). THE IRAQ WAR AND ITS CONSEQUENCES: Thoughts of Nobel Peace Laureates and Eminent Scholars. World Scientific. ISBN 978-981-238-588-8.
- Bergen, Kathy; et al. (2007). When the Rain Returns:Toward Justice and Reconciliation in Palestine and Israel. Philadelphia: American Friends Service Committee. ISBN 978-0-910082-47-1.
- Cobban, Helena; Khouri, Rami G. (2024). Understanding Hamas: And Why That Matters. OR Books. ISBN 978-1-682196-34-2.
