= Israel State Archives =

National archive of Israel

- ארכיון מדינת ישראל
- 31.7540°N 35.2118°E
- Location: Jerusalem, Israel
- Type: National archive
- Established: 1949

Collection
- Items collected: Documents, maps, stamps, audio tapes, video clips, photographs, special publications
- Size: 400 million

Other information
- Parent organization: Prime Minister's Office

Israel State Archives (ISA; Hebrew: ארכיון מדינת ישראל Arkhiyon Medinat Yisra'el) is the national archive of Israel, located in Jerusalem. The archive houses some 400 million documents, maps, stamps, audio tapes, video clips, photographs and special publications.

== History ==
The archive was established in 1949 to house historical records of government administrations from the Ottoman era to the end of the British Mandate and document the newly established State of Israel.

In 2008, the Israel Museum mounted "Blue and White Pages," a joint exhibit with the Israel State Archives featuring documents relating to the history of the Jewish people from ancient times until the present.

In 2012, the headquarters of the archive were closed until further notice after it was found that the building had been operating without the appropriate permit for the previous 19 years. According to a source quoted by Haaretz, obtaining a permit and reopening of the archive will take a matter of months. Access to the archives for researchers will be halted until the building reopens.

== Israeli archiving policy ==
The archive operates as a branch of the Prime Minister's Office. Israeli government institutions deposit their records at the State Archive 10–15 years after the closure of a file. Israeli declassification policy is based on the Archives Law of 1955. The principle of the law is that all material is to be released after thirty years, subject to limitations based on damage to state security, foreign policy or personal privacy. In practice this means that declassification of documents are fixed at different periods based on type of material and date of production. The original law has been modified and updated a number of times.

Following a 2012 update of the legislation, the office of the Prime Minister released as statement explaining that "the new regulations shorten the period after which non-security-related material may be viewed, from 30 to 15 years, while lengthening the confidentiality period of certain defense-related documents to 70 years in cases in which Israel's security conditions require it".

== Departments ==
Archive departments include the Department of Archives and Documentation, Registration and Indexing Department, Department of Services to the Public and Auxiliary Services, Publication of Documents Department, Records and Management Department, and Supervision of Public and Private Archives Department.

== Digitization ==
A program of digitization of the archive had by 2008 scanned 1 million documents to be stored in digital format with the aim of making them available online. In 2012, the Archives inaugurated the "Documentation on the Web" initiative which provides online access to items in its collections. Israel's chief archivist, Yaacov Lozowick, described the motivation behind the initiative, explaining that "the mission of the archives is to transfer the documentation of the government to the possession of the governed". He further noted that "since much of the content is both fascinating and relevant to most aspects of society’s life, enabling the citizens to have free and easy access to their documentation—within the obvious constraints—will enrich the public discourse and strengthen Israeli democracy." As part of this process Lozowick maintains an English language blog highlighting material made available online by the archive.

== 2017 dispute over access ==
In 2017 the archives were informed by Deputy Attorney General Raz Nizri that existing practice for providing access to archives was illegal. According to Nizri, all requests have to be approved by the body that deposited the material, instead of being released on the Archive's own criteria. This applies to all material and not only to classified material. Chief Archivist Lozowick protested that the ruling had almost brought to a halt the Archive's work of providing material to historians and other researchers, predicting delays of up to two years for material that should be available quickly. The final version of Lozowick's report, dated 28 December 2017, summarized the situation thus:

Israel does not deal with its archival material as befits a democratic state. The vast majority of archival material is closed and will never be opened. The minority that will be opened will have unreasonable restrictions. There is no public accountability or transparency in the release of records.

== 2023 cyber attack ==
In November 2023, a pro-Palestinian group calling itself CyberToufan attacked the archive servers, disabling its user-facing functions and stealing personal information of archive users. As of late July 2026, the English-language version of the website is still not functional.

== See also ==
- Central Zionist Archives
- Thirty year rule
- Benny Morris
