= Yaacov Lozowick =

Israeli historian and writer

- יעקב לזוביק
- Born: 1957 (age 68–69); Bad Kreuznach, West Germany

Yaacov Lozowick (Hebrew: יעקב לזוביק; born 1957) is a German-born Israeli historian and writer. He was the director of the archives at Yad Vashem. From 2011 to 2018 he was Israel's Chief Archivist at the Israel State Archives.

== Biography ==
Yaakov Lozowick was born in 1957 in Bad Kreuznach. In 1980, he gained qualifications as a tourist guide. In 1982, he graduated with a bachelor's degree in history and Jewish philosophy from the Hebrew University of Jerusalem. In 1984 he obtained a diploma in pedagogy and in 1989 a master's degree in contemporary Judaism from the Hebrew University. In 1995, he completed his doctorate in contemporary Judaism at Hebrew University.

== Professional career ==
In 1985-1990, Lozowick worked as a class educator and history teacher and at Himmelfarb high school for boys in Jerusalem.

In 1986-1989, he taught modern Jewish history at World Union of Jewish Students Academy. He worked as a researcher at Yad Vashem from 1982, and served as director of Seminars for Educators from Abroad from 1989 to 1993. At the suggestion of Austrian political scientist Andreas Maislinger, he organized the first German-language Seminars for Educators from Abroad.

From 1993 until 2007 he served as the director of the Archives at Yad Vashem.

Lozowick's 2003 book Right to Exist: a Moral Defense of Israel's Wars is an attempt to apply Just War theory to Israel's wars. Lozowick was described by Contemporary Sociology as a "long time leftist and peace activist."

Lozowick was Israel's chief archivist at the Israel State Archives from 2011 to 2018. Lozowick was a leader in the efforts to digitize the national archives, the role of which he describes is "to transfer the documentation of the government to the possession of the governed". He has explains that "since much of the content is both fascinating and relevant to most aspects of society's life, enabling the citizens to have free and easy access to their documentation—within the obvious constraints—will enrich the public discourse and strengthen Israeli democracy." As part of this process Lozowick maintains an English language blog highlighting material made available online by the archive.

In 2017, Lozowick published a report strongly critical of the procedures for releasing files and especially of new changes. The report summarized the situation thus:

Israel does not deal with its archival material as befits a democratic state. The vast majority of archival material is closed and will never be opened. The minority that will be opened will have unreasonable restrictions. There is no public accountability or transparency in the release of records.

== Published works ==
- Hitler's Bureaucrats: The Nazi Security Police and the Banality of Evil, Continuum, London and New York, 2002, ISBN 0-8264-5711-8
- Right to Exist: a Moral Defense of Israel's Wars, Anchor Books, 2004, ISBN 1-4000-3243-1
- Serious Scholarship, Lightweight Polemics, review of Mark Mazower's book Hitler's Empire: Nazi Rule in Occupied Europe, 2010.
