= The Case for Peace =

2005 book by Alan Dershowitz

The Case for Peace: How The Arab–Israeli Conflict Can Be Resolved
- Author: Alan Dershowitz
- Publication date: 2005
- Preceded by: The Case for Israel

The Case for Peace: How The Arab–Israeli Conflict Can Be Resolved is a 2005 book by Alan Dershowitz and follow-up to his 2003 book The Case for Israel.

== Summary ==
Dershowitz was originally planning to write The Case Against Israel's Enemies; however, after the death of Yasser Arafat the author chose to focus on more positive and optimistic themes, believing that the death of the PA chairman has opened new doors to peace. Dershowitz argues a final peace settlement that will involve:

- two states
  - Dershowitz argues that the Palestinian state may be composed of multiple disjoint areas, because in today's world of high-speed internet and cheap travel, states do not require contiguity to be viable.
- the division of Jerusalem
  - Dershowitz proposes Israel gets sovereignty over the Old City of Jerusalem's Christian, Jewish and Armenian quarters, while Palestinians may get sovereignty over the Muslim quarter. Regarding Temple Mount itself, he proposed both Israeli and Palestinian sovereignty.
- a renunciation of violence

He asserts that Palestinians should not be offered more than what was on the table during the Camp David negotiations of 2000, as it would reward violence. He concentrates on the shared elements of the peace process that he says both mainstream Israelis and Palestinians agree on.

== Reception ==
Publishers Weekly remarked that Dershowitz "bombards opponents with inflammatory charges based on sometimes tendentious readings of skimpily contextualized remarks..." It also stated that the book lacked "the judicious treatment these issues cry out for."

Michael D. Langan of The Boston Globe writes: "Dershowitz makes a compelling 'Case for Peace'...The author's advocacy skills are well-honed and incisive. In fact, one is reminded of the logical argumentation used by Thomas Aquinas in his Summa Theologica...: laying out basic questions for analysis, exploring arguments that appear reasonable, and concluding with an equivalent of Aquinas's famous 'I answer that ...,' which gives the 'correct' answer.

Norman Finkelstein writes that Dershowitz's book was mainly an attempt to rationalize then-PM Ariel Sharon's "land grab" in the West Bank, and Dershowitz rationalized that under the guise of a two-state solution.

Mark Lewis, writing for The New York Times Book Review, writes that "The Case for Peace is faithful to the title: Dershowitz says Yasser Arafat's death makes peace possible, if the Palestinians accept a state based in Gaza and 'nearly all of the West Bank,' with a division of greater Jerusalem." Lewis further writes:

To Dershowitz, many of Israel's critics (even some Jewish ones) are anti-Semites who are undermining the peace process. He condemns the double standard that tends to shield Israel's campus critics from the self-appointed sensitivity police. But his own call to marginalize those who engage in anti-Israel hate speech – as defined by Dershowitz himself – would merely transfer the policeman's baton from one side to the other.

== See also ==
- Arab–Israeli conflict
