= Ronald Sanders (writer) =

American journalist (1932–1991)

- Born: July 7, 1932; Union City, New Jersey, U.S.
- Died: January 11, 1991 (aged 58)
- Occupations: Journalist; writer
- Spouse: Beverly Gingold (m. 1967)
- Parent(s): George Harold Sanders; Rose Rachlin

Ronald Sanders (July 7, 1932 – January 11, 1991) was an American journalist and writer.

Sanders was born in Union City, New Jersey. His father was English-born musician George Harold Sanders, and mother Rose Rachlin was daughter of Russian Jewish immigrants. He had a sister named Marilyn. The family did not practice any religious traditions, but when in the U.S. Army Sanders filled a form which required to indicate religious affiliation, Sanders chose Judaism.

In 1960 he won a Fulbright Fellowship for research of French socialists and moved to live in Paris for this purpose. He took this opportunity to travel to the Soviet Union and for his first trip to Israel.

During 1966–1975 he was on the staff of the Midstream Magazine, being its editor-in-chief during 1973–1975. Sanders married Beverly Gingold on March 19, 1967. They had no children.

He was the first recipient of the B'nai B'rith Book Award, for his work The Downtown Jews.

Sanders died of liver cancer at age 58.

== Books ==
- Socialist Thought: A Documentary History, 1964
- Israel: A View from Masada, 1966
- The Downtown Jews: Portraits of an Immigrant Generation, 1969
- Reflections on a Teapot, 1973
- Lost Tribes and Promised Lands; The Origins of American Racism, 1978
- The Lower East Side, 1980
- The Days Grow Short: The Life and Music of Kurt Weill, 1980
- The High Walls of Jerusalem: A History of the Balfour Declaration and the Birth of the British Mandate for Palestine, 1984
- Shores of Refuge: A Hundred Years of Jewish Emigration, 1988
- The Americanization of Isaac Bashevis Singer, 1989
