= Yehoshua Porath =

Israeli historian and academic (1938–2019)

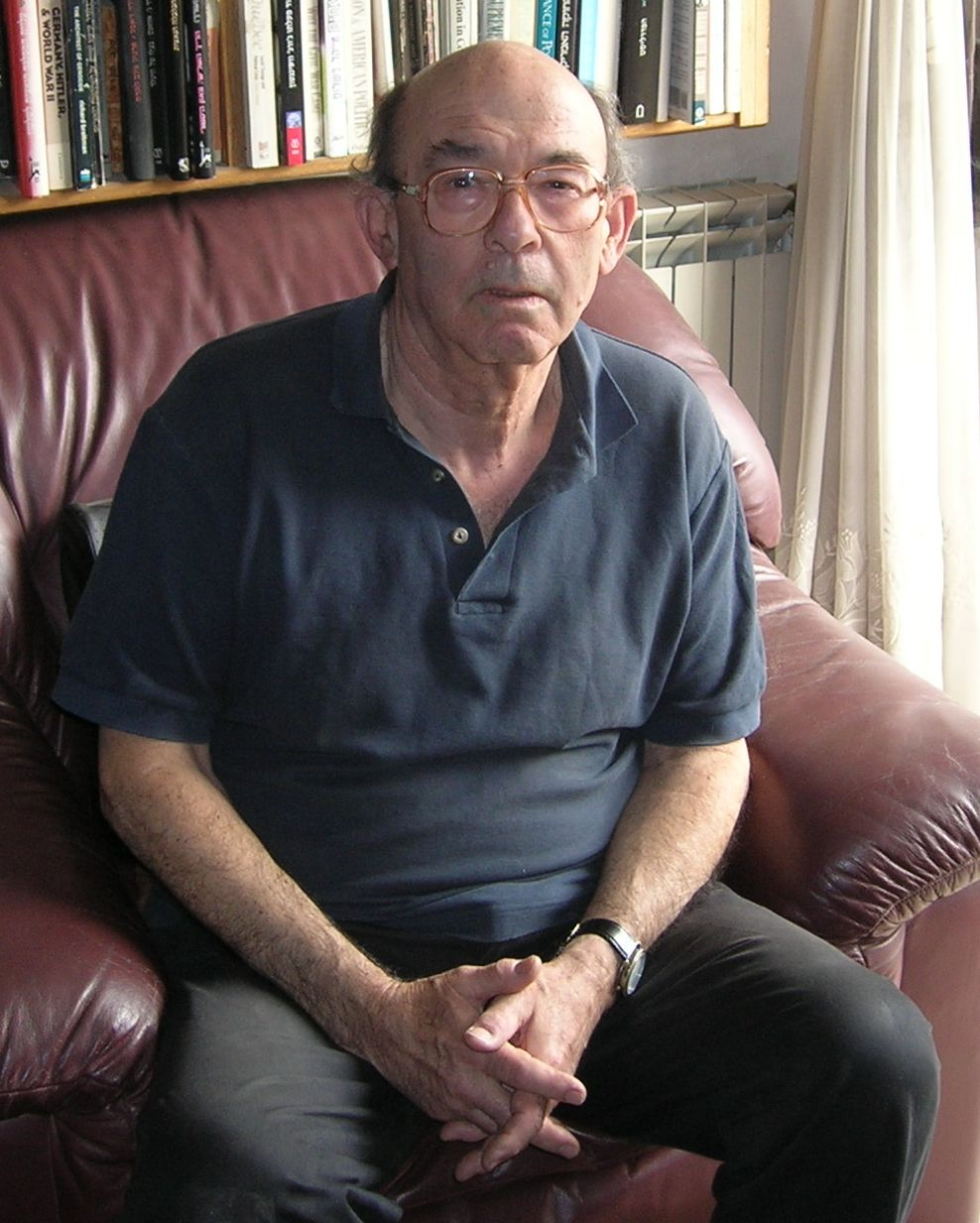
Prof. Yehoshua Porat, 2010

Yehoshua Porath (Hebrew: יהושע פורת; January 13, 1938 – November 24, 2019) was an Israeli historian and professor of Middle East history.

== Academic career ==
Yehoshua Porath was a lecturer in the History of Muslim Countries at the Hebrew University of Jerusalem. He specialized in the history of Palestinian nationalism. Porat won the Landau Prize and the Ben-Zvi Prize for his book on Yonatan Ratosh. His other research included:

- Communism in Arab Israeli communities
- Maronite Peasants' Revolt in Lebanon 1858-1860
- Palestine, Arab unity and British policy 1930–1945

== Political views ==
Porath was on the Meretz list in the 1992 Israeli elections for the Knesset. He later readjusted his political views. He opposed the Oslo accords between PLO and Israel. In the 1996 elections he participated in the campaign of the Likud party and supported Benjamin Netanyahu for prime minister. The change in his political affiliations came due to the issue of whether or not the PLO would change the anti-Israel articles in its covenant. Porath was asked to translate recordings of the meeting of the Palestine National Council which had pledged to make the changes. Porath argued they had not, despite the Meretz and Labor parties insisting that they had.

Since 1967 he argued that peace must be reached with Jordan and that this could not be done with representatives of Palestinian Arabs.

Porath defined himself as a "moderate, liberal and secular center man." He opposed the reestablishment of Jewish community in Gaza after the Six Day War, but opposed their forced removal in the Disengagement of 2005.

He was active in the Secular Movement and the Free People's Movement and had been an active member of the Shinui party. Haaretz reported that his wife said he "loved the Bible as a text."

== Personal life ==
He lived in Jerusalem, and was married to Penina. They had two children. He died on November 24, 2019, in Jerusalem and was buried the next day in Kibbutz Nahshon cemetery.

== Published works in English ==
- The Emergence of the Palestinian-Arab National Movement, 1918–1929, Cass (1974) ISBN 0-7146-2939-1
- In Search of Arab Unity, 1930–1945, Cass (1986) ISBN 0-7146-3264-3

== Published works in Hebrew ==
- Social Aspects in the Growth of the Palestinian Arab Movement Jerusalem: Homol, 1971.
- Growth of the Palestinian Arab National Movement: 1929-1918, Tel Aviv: Am Oved Publishing, 1976.
- From riots to rebellion: Palestinian National Arab Movement 1939-1929, Tel Aviv: Am Oved, 1969.
- In the test of political action: Israel, Arab unity and British policy 1930–1945. Jerusalem: Yad Yitzhak Ben-Zvi, 1985.
- Shelach and pen in hand: The story of Uriel Shelach's life ( Yonatan Ratosh ). Tel Aviv: Literary Notebooks, 1989.
