= Joan Peters =

American journalist (1936–2015)

- Born: Joan Friedman; April 29, 1936; Chicago, Illinois, U.S.
- Died: January 5, 2015 (aged 78); Chicago, Illinois, U.S.
- Other name: Joan Caro
- Works: From Time Immemorial (1984)
- Spouses: Gary Peters; Stanley Kaplan (d. 1991); William A. Caro
- Awards: National Jewish Book Award (1985)

Joan Peters (née Friedman; April 29, 1936 – January 5, 2015), later Joan Caro, was an American journalist and broadcaster. She wrote the 1984 book From Time Immemorial, a controversial book that claimed that some of the modern Palestinian people were not indigenous to Palestine.

== Life ==
Peters was born in Chicago. She studied at the University of Illinois without earning a degree and became a freelance writer for publications like Harper's. She became "fascinated by the Middle East while covering the Yom Kippur War as a freelancer for CBS in 1973".

Her first marriage, to Gary Peters, ended in divorce. Her second marriage, to Stanley Kaplan, lasted until his death in 1991. She married William A. Caro in 1997 and went by the name Joan Caro.

In the 1970s and early 1980s, Peters wrote for magazines such as Harper's, Commentary, The New Republic, and The New Leader, was a consultant in the creation of CBS news documentaries in 1973 about the Israeli–Palestinian conflict, and provided commentary on the subject for PBS. Her dedication to the cause of Israel may have been triggered by a visit in the 1970s to the Soviet Union, where officials treated her and her husband with suspicion.

According to the Walker Agency, which booked speaking and touring engagements for her, Peters also served as an adviser to the White House on American foreign policy in the Middle East during the Carter administration.

In From Time Immemorial (1984), she argued that Palestinians are largely not indigenous to modern Israel and therefore have no claim to its territory. The book became controversial and its central claims were discredited by reputable scholars shortly after its publication. Scholars and writers across the political spectrum criticized it, including Norman Finkelstein, Noam Chomsky, Edward Said, Yehoshua Porath, Ian Gilmour, and David Gilmour.

Peters died at her home in Chicago in 2015 of a cerebral embolism. Shortly before her death, the Israeli ambassador to the United Nations, Ron Prosor, telephoned to convey to her that Israel's prime minister Benjamin Netanyahu was deeply grateful for her work.

== Awards ==
+ 1985: National Jewish Book Award in the Israel category for From Time Immemorial: The Origins of the Arab-Jewish Conflict over Palestine
