= William B. Quandt =

American political scientist and writer (born 1941)

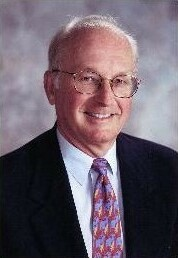
- Born: November 23, 1941 (age 84); Los Angeles, California
- Education: Stanford University (BA); Massachusetts Institute of Technology (PhD)
- Occupations: Political scientist; writer
- Spouse: Helena Cobban

William B. Quandt (born November 23, 1941) is an American political scientist, author, and professor emeritus in the Department of Politics at the University of Virginia. He previously served as senior fellow in the Foreign Policy Studies Program at the Brookings Institution and as a member on the National Security Council in the administrations of Richard Nixon and Jimmy Carter. He was actively involved in the negotiations that led to the Camp David Accords and the Egypt–Israel peace treaty. His areas of expertise include Algeria, Egypt, Israel, Palestine, the Israeli–Palestinian peace process, and U.S. foreign policy.

== Early life ==
Quandt was born in 1941 in Los Angeles, California. He received his bachelor's degree in international relations from Stanford University in 1963, and his Ph.D. in political science from the Massachusetts Institute of Technology (MIT) in 1968. He has received several research grants, including ones from the Social Science Research Council (1966–1968) and the Council on Foreign Relations (1972–1973). He was also an associate professor of political science at the University of Pennsylvania, worked at the Rand Corporation in the Department of Social Science from 1968 to 1972, and taught at the University of California, Los Angeles (UCLA) and MIT.

== Career ==
Quandt served as a staff member on the National Security Council in the administrations of Richard Nixon from 1972 to 1974 and Jimmy Carter from 1977 to 1979. He was actively involved in the negotiations that led to the Camp David Accords and the Egyptian–Israeli Peace Treaty.

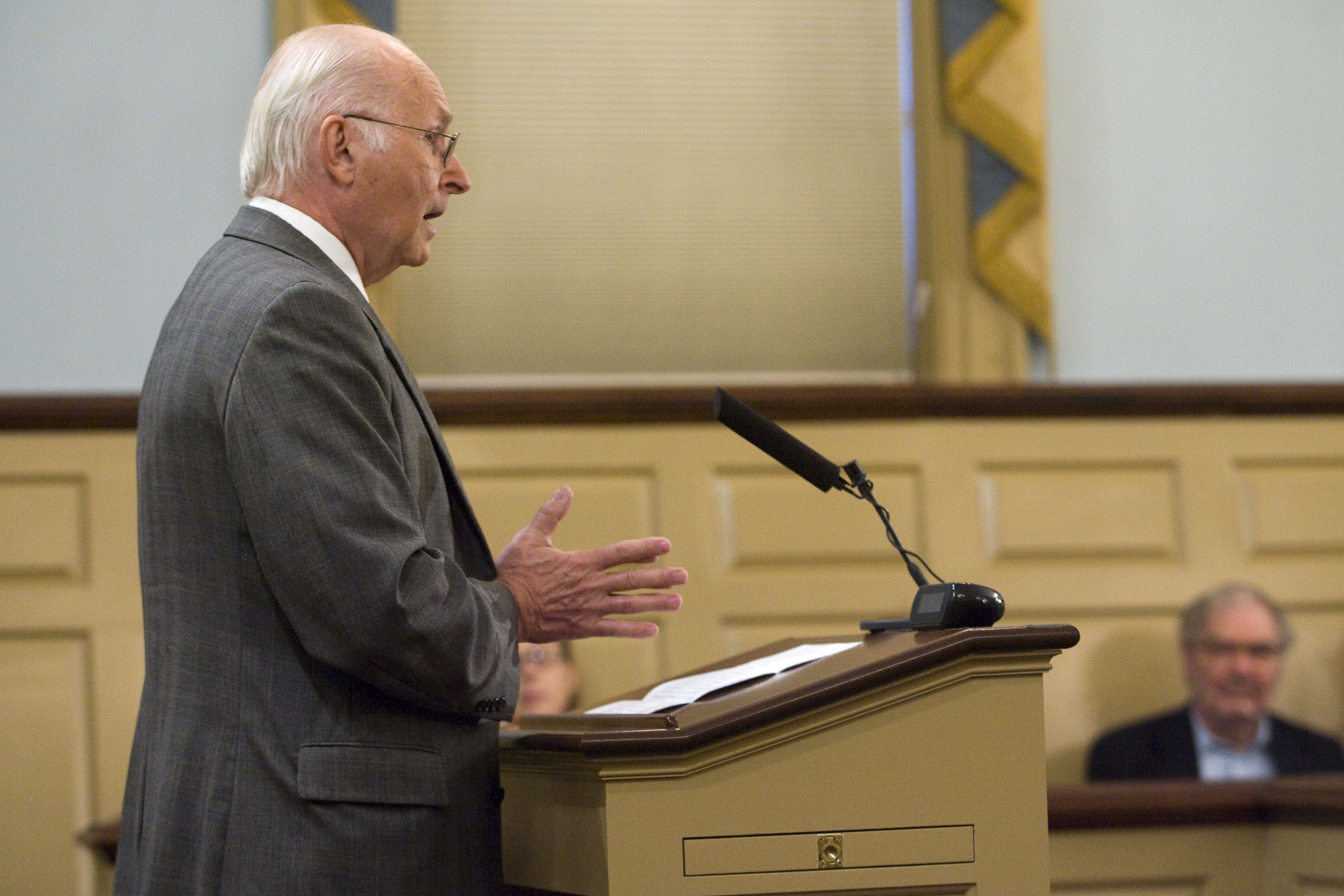
Quandt speaking at the Miller Center of Public Affairs in 2010

Between 1979 and 1994, Quandt was a Senior Fellow in the Foreign Policy Studies Program at the Brookings Institution, where he conducted research on the Middle East, American policy toward the Arab–Israeli conflict, and energy policy.

From 1987 to 1988, he was president of the Middle East Studies Association, a learned society. He joined the Department of Politics at the University of Virginia in 1994, where he held the departmental Edward R. Stettinius chair. He taught courses on the Middle East and American foreign policy. From 2000 to 2003, he also served as Vice Provost for International Affairs. In 2004, he was elected to the American Academy of Arts and Sciences. After the fall semester of 2012, Quandt retired from his teaching career at UVA. Professor Schulhofer-Wohl, his replacement, commended his legacy by pointing out that "more than 200 students take [his class] every year, and that's clearly due in no small part to Dr. Quandt and what he brings to it. It's an amazing opportunity for me to be able to work so closely with such a distinguished scholar in this way. I don't think many people have that kind of chance."

From 1992 to 2017, he served on the board of trustees of the American University in Cairo. He has also served on the board of the Foundation for Middle East Peace and was a member of the Council on Foreign Relations.

Quandt has both praised and criticized the United States' post-World War II Middle East policy. Quandt praised American leaders for opposing colonial influences in the Middle East (for example, Eisenhower's opposition to the joint Israeli-British-French invasion of Egypt). Other American successes included maintaining stability in key oil-rich countries, promoting peace between Egypt and Israel, and avoiding direct confrontation with the Soviet Union. Quandt accused neoconservatives under President George W. Bush of trying to destabilize the Middle East and provoke anti-American sentiment.

== Personal life ==
Quandt is married to the writer Helena Cobban and has one daughter and two stepchildren. He lives in Washington D.C.

== Publications ==
William Quandt has written numerous books, and his articles have appeared in a wide variety of publications.

=== Books ===
- Revolution and Political Leadership: Algeria, 1954-1968. Cambridge, Massachusetts: MIT Press. 1969. ISBN 026267002X.
- Decade of Decisions: American Policy Toward the Arab-Israeli Conflict, 1967-1976. Berkeley: University of California Press. 1977. ISBN 0520034694.
- Saudi Arabia in the 1980s: Foreign Policy, Security, and Oil. Washington, D.C.: Brookings Institution Press. 1981. ISBN 0815772866.
- Camp David: Peacemaking and Politics. Washington, D.C.: Brookings Institution. 1986. ISBN 0815772904.
- The United States and Egypt: An Essay on Policy for the 1990s. Washington, D.C.: Brookings Institution. 1990. ISBN 0815772955.
- Peace Process: American Diplomacy and Arab-Isræli Conflict Since 1967. Washington, D.C.: Brookings Institution Press. 1993. ISBN 0520083881.
- Between Ballots and Bullets: Algeria's Transition from Authoritarianism. Washington, D.C.: Brookings Institution Press. 1998. ISBN 0815773021.

=== As editor ===
- The Middle East: Ten Years After Camp David. Washington, D.C.: Brookings Institution. 1988. ISBN 0815772947.
- Troubled Triangle: The United States, Turkey, and Israel in the New Middle East. Washington, D.C.: Just World Books. 2011. ISBN 978-1935982104.
