= Gaza war protests =

Protests beginning in 2023

- Part of International reactions to the Gaza war
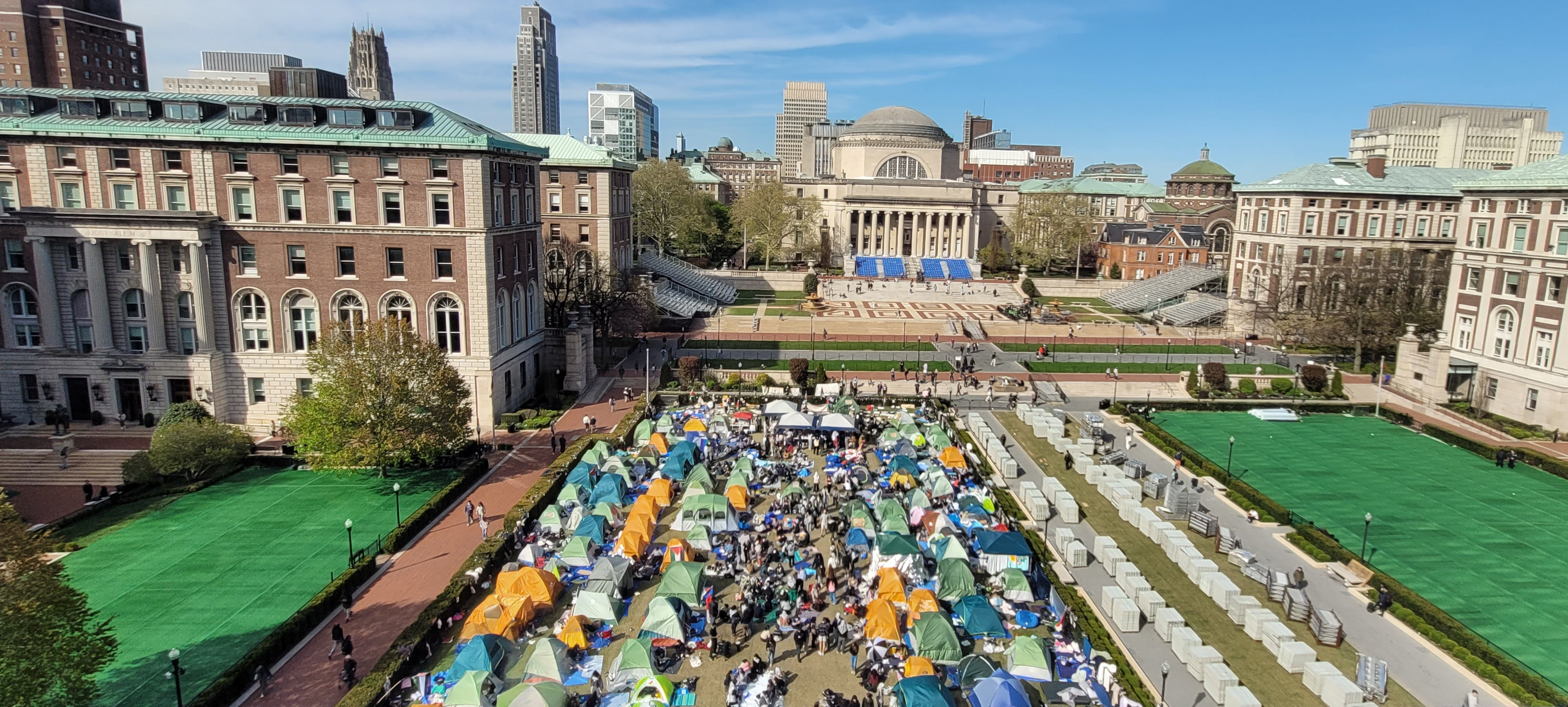
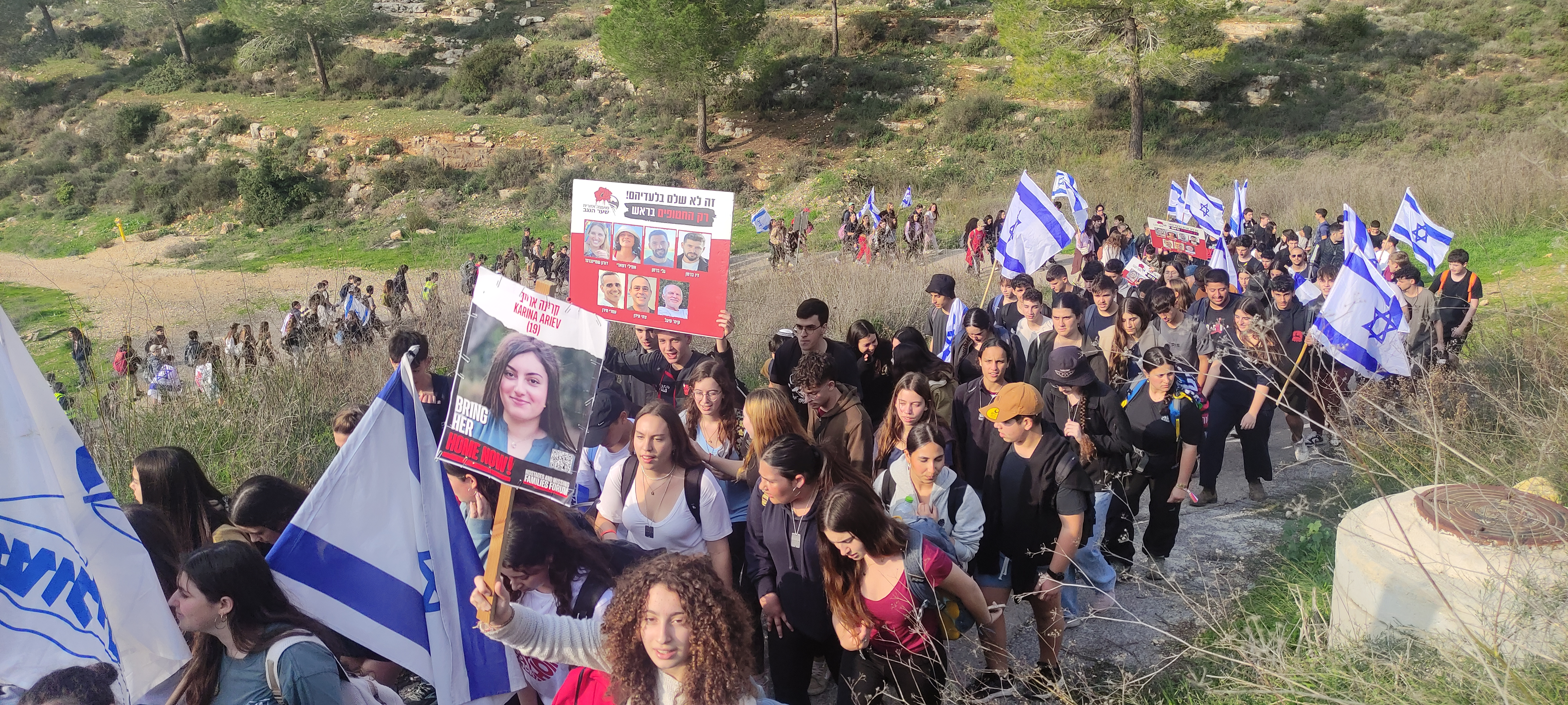
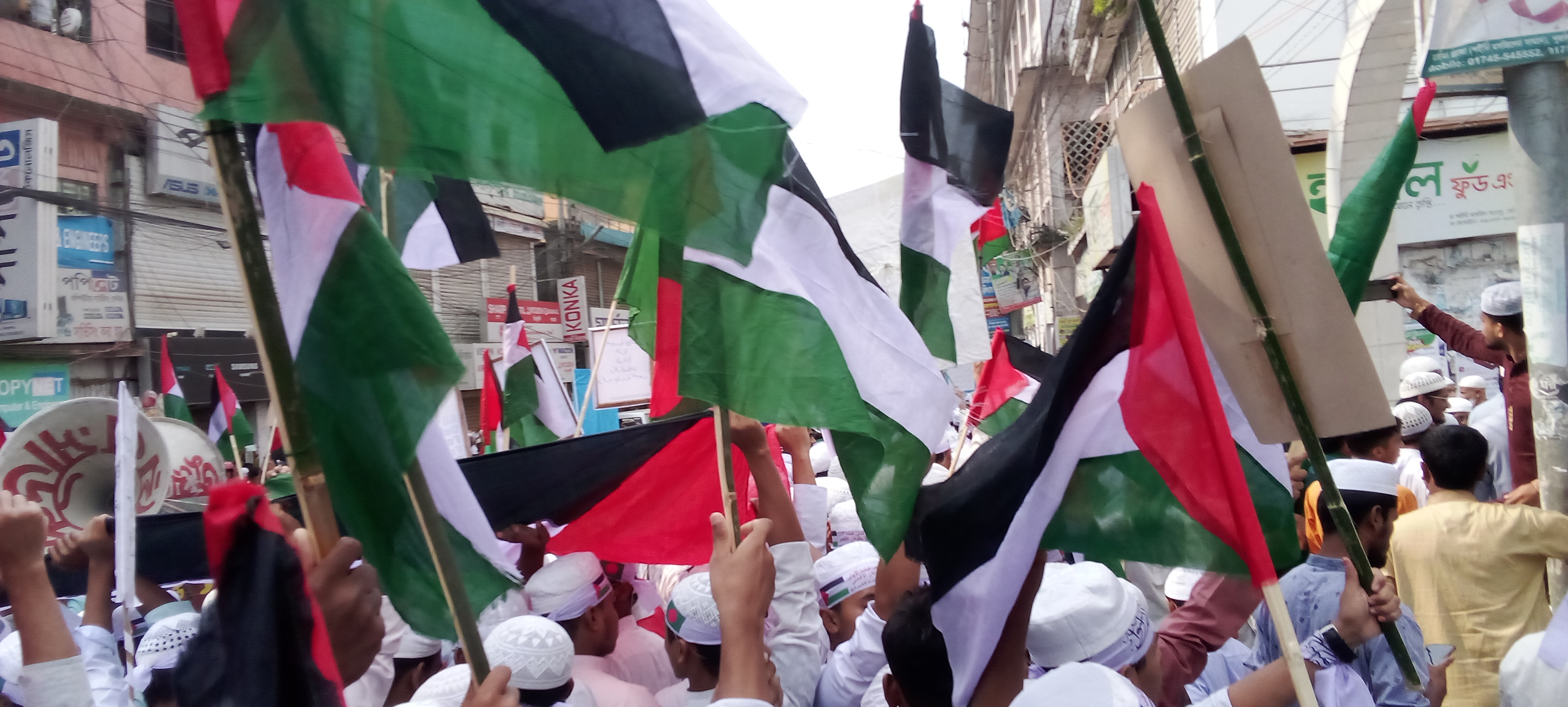
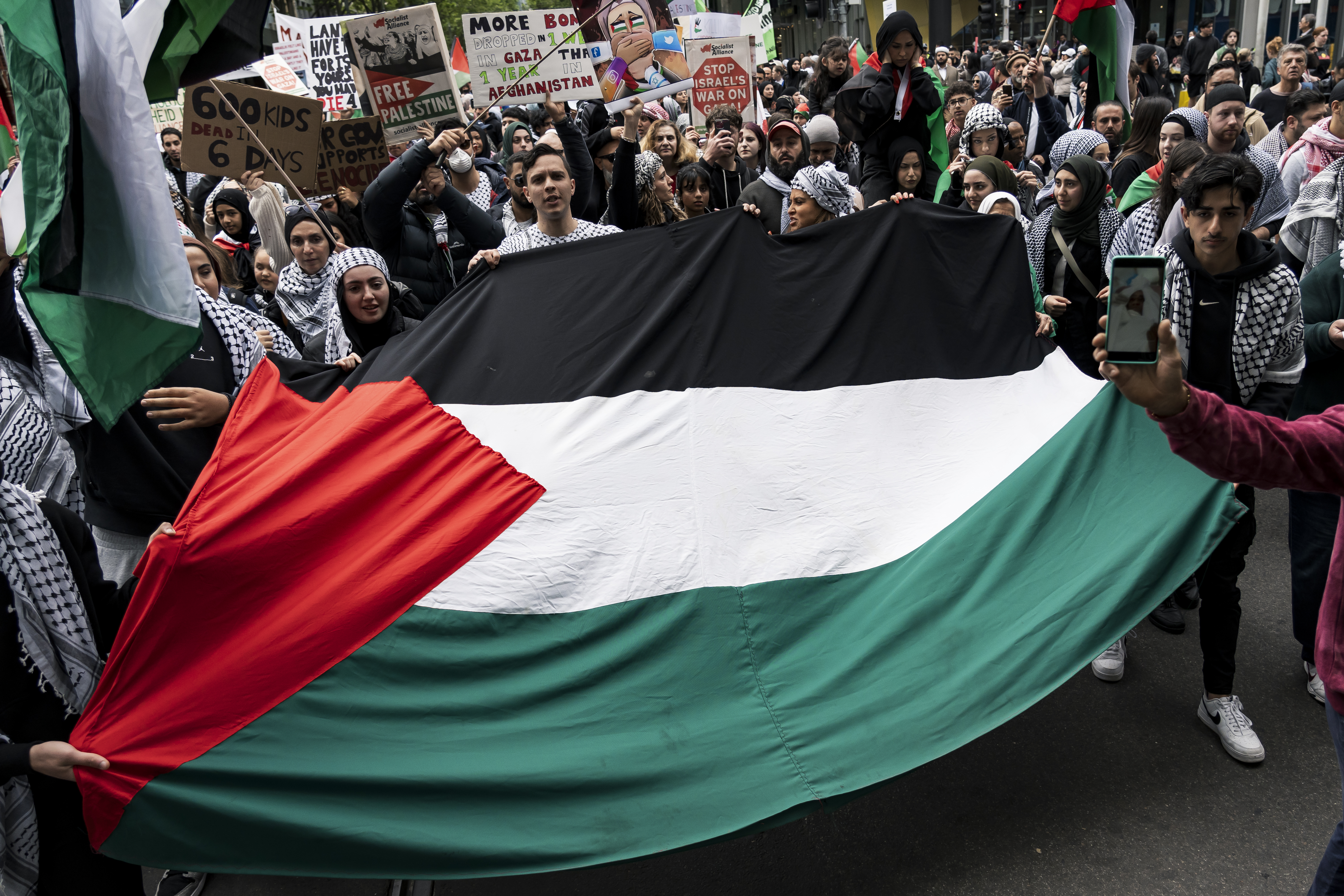
- Clockwise from top: Gaza Solidarity Encampment at Columbia University in New York City; Pro-Palestine protest in Bangladesh; Pro-Palestine protest in Melbourne; Protest calling for the return of the hostages in Israel
- Date: 8 October 2023 – present (3 years, 1 month and 2 weeks)
- Location: Global
- Caused by: 2023 Hamas-led attack on Israel; Gaza war; Gaza humanitarian crisis (2023–present); Gaza genocide; Foreign military aid to Israel
- Goals: Varied: Ceasefire and an end to hostilities; Release of hostages held in Gaza; Humanitarian aid access and lifting of the Israeli blockade; Support of Palestine and an end to the Israeli occupation; Support of Israel; One-state solution or Two-state solution; Support of Hamas and the Axis of Resistance, calls for the destruction of Israel
- Methods: Protests, demonstrations, boycotts, civil disobedience, civil disorder, occupation, internet activism, self-immolation, sit-ins

Casualties
- Deaths: At least 20 (Note: Nigeria: 7; Indonesia: 1; Pakistan: 8 (including Murder of Asif Nawaz); Palestine: 1; United States: 3 (2 from self-immolations))

The Gaza war has sparked protests, demonstrations, and vigils around the world. These protests focused on a variety of issues related to the conflict, including demands for a ceasefire, an end to the Israeli blockade and occupation, return of Israeli hostages, protesting war crimes, ending US support for Israel and providing humanitarian aid to Gaza. Since the war began on 7 October 2023, the death toll has exceeded 70,000.

Some of the protests have resulted in violence and accusations of antisemitism and anti-Palestinianism. In some European countries, and Palestine itself, protestors were criminalized, in countries such as France, Germany, the United Kingdom, and Hungary, which restricted pro-Palestinian political speech, while the Israeli media outlet Ynet reported that Hamas in Gaza tortured and executed anti-Hamas demonstrators. The conflict also sparked large protests at Israeli and U.S. embassies around the world.

According to Armed Conflict Location and Event Data (ACLED), nearly 48,000 pro-Palestinian demonstrations were held globally between 7 October 2023 and September 2025, making up 15% of all demonstrations worldwide.

1. Middle East 22,066 (46.0%): 22,066 events
2. Europe & Central Asia 8,298 (17.3%): 8,298 events
3. Africa 6,528 (13.6%): 6,528 events
4. United States & Canada 6,097 (12.7%): 6,097 events
5. Asia-Pacific 4,556 (9.50%): 4,556 events
6. Latin America & the Caribbean 436 (0.91%): 436 events

== Israel ==
Israeli citizens participated in public protests related to war policies. Jewish Israeli anti-war activists experienced targeting by far-right groups, while Palestinian citizens of Israel experienced crackdowns on free speech, with people arrested for social media posts and likes. Anti-war protests erupted in the Triangle and Galilee, with Israeli police repressing demonstrators in Umm El Fahm, a city in the Triangle. In March, another protest occurred in the city, urging Israel to "end its criminal war"

A hostage-solidarity rally in Tel Aviv on 14 October criticized the government's handling of the war and called on Prime Minister Benjamin Netanyahu to resign. The next day, communications minister Shlomo Karhi proposed emergency regulations allowing for the arrest of people who hurt "national morale". Following a rally in support of Gaza in Haifa, police commissioner Kobi Shabtai threatened to send antiwar protesters to the Gaza Strip on buses. On 28 October, a mob of Israelis gathered at Netanya Academic College chanting "death to Arabs" at Palestinian students living in the campus dormitories.

On 4 November, protests were held near Netanyahu's residence. On 8 November, the Israel Supreme Court allowed police to bar all anti-war protests. On 9 November, Israeli police arrested former member of the Knesset Mohammad Barakeh in Nazareth for attempting to organize an anti-war protest. In an interview with Time Magazine, Barakeh described Israel's crackdowns on free speech as fascist. On 18 November, Israel held its first permitted anti-war protest in Tel Aviv.

The Knesset criminalized the "consumption of terrorist materials" on 8 November. Civil rights groups criticized the bill, stating it "invades the realm of personal thoughts and beliefs". On 2 December, an attorney at Adalah, an Israeli legal center, stated law enforcement was using the law to surveil and silence people, while Association for Civil Rights in Israel said it was "unprecedented in democratic countries".

On 20 November, Kan 11 posted and then deleted a video produced by a private NGO, showing children who were evacuated from Gaza envelope settlements singing "we'll eliminate them all and go back to plowing our fields". On 23 November, communications minister Shlomo Karhi proposed defunding the newspaper Haaretz due to its "defeatist and false propaganda". On 23 November, ahead of the hostage-swap, National Security Minister Itamar Ben Gvir stated that any "expressions of joy" related to the release of Palestinian prisoners was "equivalent to backing terrorism".

On 25 November, protesters in Jerusalem called on Netanyahu to resign. Jews and Israelis abroad participated in protests both supporting and protesting the Israeli response in the war. On 29 November, police arrested activists at a Knesset protest opposing the government. Six were arrested on 2 December protesting outside Netanyahu's house in Caesarea. A suspected arson-originated fire was reported at a protest camp for the families of hostages held in Gaza; the families experienced harassment from right-wing Netanyahu supporters.

On 16 December, protesters set up tents outside the Israeli Defense Ministry in Tel Aviv and stated they would not leave until the government took up hostage negotiations again. Two activists in Haifa were arrested for quietly protesting against the war.

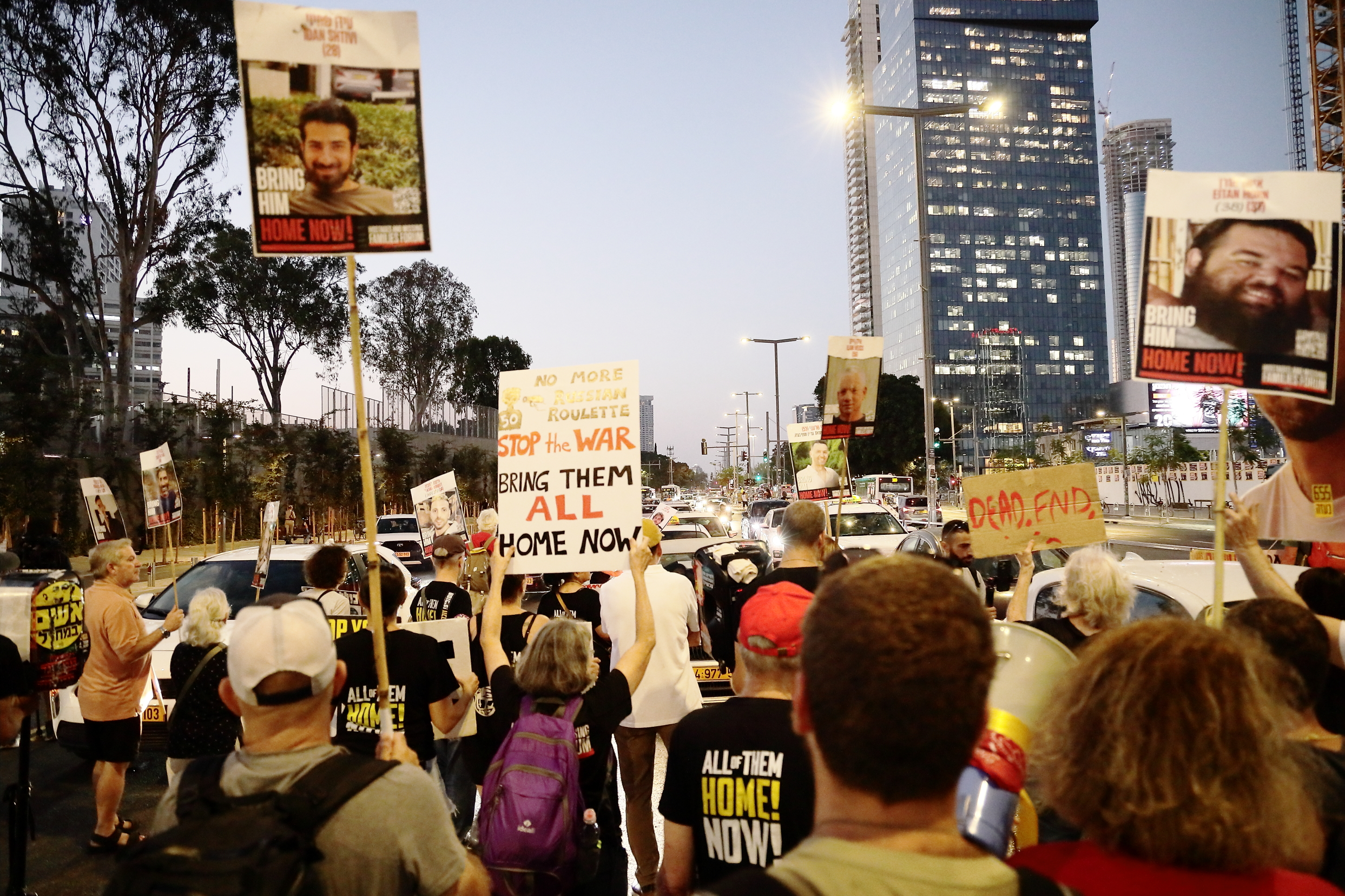
Anti-war protest in Tel Aviv, Israel, 22 July 2025

On 26 December 2023, Israeli teenager Tal Mitnick was sentenced to 30 days in jail for refusing the draft for the war which he condemned as "a revenge campaign... not only against Hamas, but against all Palestinian people". This comment was shared by one of several support groups for conscientious objectors to the IDF.

In August 2025, a nationwide protest billed as a "day of struggle" was seen across Israel with protestors calling for a hostage and ceasefire deal. The largest protest was seen in Tel Aviv with more than 300,000 people attending the protest according to organizers, with many expressing doubt in Netanyahu's government.

=== Open letters ===
Some groups in Israel expressed support for the war. Dozens of rabbis signed a letter to Netanyahu and senior defence officials stating that "even when the enemy hides behind a human shield... there is no halakhic or moral preclusion, nor legal preclusion, from bombing the enemy after sufficient advance warning".

A group of 100 doctors called "Doctors for the Rights of Israeli Soldiers", signed a statement stating Israel had a "legitimate right" to bomb "terror nests and Hamas headquarters in the hospitals in Gaza". This prompted a harsh reply from the acting head of the ethics office at the Israel Medical Association, Dr. Tami Karni, who wrote that "doctors are sworn to heal, not kill... Israel's doctors have refused to be dragged into the consciental and moral decline of the enemy, and will continue to act accordingly". The White Robes, an organization which numbers in the hundreds, decried the letter as a "provocative pamphlet by an extremist minority", stating that "calls for indiscriminate destruction and killing, even if justified militarily, are not part of the medical ethical code". Physicians for Human Rights published an open letter signed by 350 physicians and medical personnel, which also condemns the aforementioned call.

In September 2023, over 200 Israeli youth released an open letter entitled Youth Against Dictatorship, announcing that they would refuse to serve.

== Palestine ==
=== West Bank and East Jerusalem ===
On 12 October 2023, Hamas called for Palestinians to protest in East Jerusalem and the West Bank, encouraging demonstrations at the Al-Aqsa Mosque. They also called for protests in neighboring countries and around the world, urging Muslim communities to rally in support of Gaza.

After the Al-Ahli Arab Hospital explosion, protests broke out in the West Bank in support of Gaza. On 27 October, hundreds rallied in Ramallah to support Gaza, despite fears of settler violence. On 1 November 2023, a general strike was observed in the West Bank and East Jerusalem in opposition to the Israeli attacks on Gaza. On 5 November, protesters in Ramallah protested US Secretary of State Antony Blinken's visit to the West Bank, holding signs reading "Blinken, blood is on your hands". On 17 November 2023, Israeli forces fired tear gas on anti-war protestors in Hebron.

On 11 December 2023, Palestinians in the West Bank and East Jerusalem went on a general strike as part of a larger global strike for a ceasefire; the action also led to the closure of establishments, educational institutions, and administrative buildings in the occupied West Bank and East Jerusalem. Palestinian activists and grassroots organizations urged for a worldwide strike. The call for action, which gained momentum through social media, aims to encompass "all facets of public existence" and was considered on 11 December.

On 23 December 2023, the Christmas nativity scene in Bethlehem honored the deceased in Gaza. Boy and Girl Scouts in the West Bank displayed a banner commemorating the child victims of the war during Christmas Eve celebrations. Protesters in Ramallah carried a banner with the names of thousands of the deceased in Gaza on 1 January 2024. On 3 January 2024, Palestinians held a general protest in the West Bank. On 10 January, Palestinians gathered at Nelson Mandela Square in Ramallah to express support for South Africa v. Israel, a lawsuit charging Israel with genocide in Gaza at the International Court of Justice. On 7 February, protesters demonstrated at UN headquarters in Ramallah against the suspension of aid.

On 9 February 2024, Palestinians and Israelis protesting in support of a ceasefire were reportedly attacked by police in the West Bank. On 10 February, Israeli police broke up a Gaza peace protest in Jericho. Paramedics in the West Bank protested against the Israeli killing of two Palestinian Red Crescent emergency respondents killed while attempting to rescue Hind Rajab. Protesters demonstrated in Ramallah on 17 February 2024. In March 2024, the city of Jericho unveiled a street named after Aaron Bushnell, a U.S. servicemen who self-immolated in protest of U.S. support for Israel. Large protests were held in Arraba, Jenin in protest of the Israeli killing of a man named Muhammad Jaber. On 21 March 2024, residents in Jenin went on strike in protest of the killing of three young men. On 26 March 2024, video showed hundreds of people in Nur Shams refugee camp protesting against Israeli actions in Gaza. In August 2024, a report by 7amleh found that young Palestinians in the West Bank and East Jerusalem were self-censoring online due to fears of repercussions.

=== Gaza Strip ===
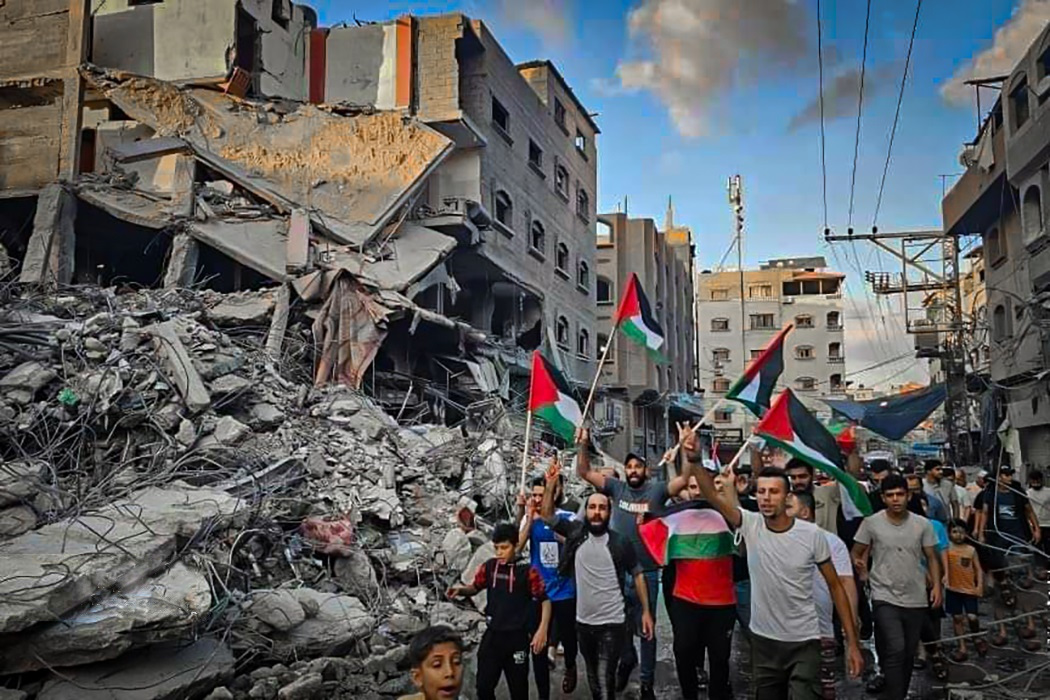
Palestinian protesters in the Gaza Strip, 16 October 2023. Photo by Anas Al-Sharif.

In Gaza, young content creators, such as Hind Khoudary, Plestia Alaqad, Motaz Azaiza, and Bisan Owda, documented their lives through the war, gaining significant followings on social media.

In January 2024, the Jewish News Syndicate reported that in a rare protest against Hamas, dozens of Gazan children held up signs outside Deir al-Balah's al-Aqsa Martyrs Hospital, asking Hamas to free Israeli hostages and end the war, expressing their desire to return home. The IDF's Arabic spokesman Avichay Adraee shared a recording of the protest on X, tweeting "Will these cries and demands reach the hideouts of Hamas leaders?". The protest occurred a day after another small protest against Hamas in Rafah where Palestinians cursed Hamas and Hamas leader Yahya Sinwar. Organized demonstration against Hamas is not allowed in Gaza. In February 2024, Sveriges Radio reported on some small spontaneous protests by desperate Gazans against Hamas.

A small group of children in Rafah held their own protest in advance of a planned Rafah offensive in February 2024, holding signs in English that read "We refuse to die" and "Save us from this genocide". Protesters at UNRWA headquarters in Jabalia called for more food, chanting, "We want flour, we want flour". Children in Rafah again held their own protest against the Gaza Strip famine on 6 March, holding a banner reading "Stop our daily death".

On 25 March 2025, large anti-Hamas and anti-war protests broke out in the North Gaza Governorate. Israeli media outlet Ynet reported that Hamas responded by torturing and executing some of those who organized the protests.

On 26 June 2026, protests were held in Gaza City and other regions of northern Gaza against Hamas.

== Africa ==
=== Algeria ===
Protests were held in Algiers on 19 October 2023 denouncing U.S. President Joe Biden, Israeli Prime Minister Benjamin Netanyahu and Arab countries that have normalized relations with Israel for "complicity" in the violence in Gaza. On 4 April 2025, at least 800 pro-Palestine protestors gathered in front of the headquarters of the Movement of Society for Peace in Algiers.

=== Botswana ===
In October and November 2023, marches were held in the capital, Gaborone to show solidarity with the Palestinians.

=== Djibouti ===
Hundreds of people, including foreign nationals, participated in a pro-Palestine march in Arta in November 2023.

=== Ghana ===
A National March for Palestine was held in Accra on 2 November, drawing thousands of participants.

=== Kenya ===
On 21 October 2023, hundreds of demonstrators in Mombasa showcased banners and waved the Palestinian flag, while slogans like "Cease the Violence", "End the Suffering of Innocent Lives" and "United with Gaza" were displayed. A protest in solidarity with Palestine was later held in Nairobi on 25 January 2024 but was dispersed by police using tear gas. A pro-Palestine protest was also held on 24 February in Mombasa.

=== Libya ===
In May 2024, students, faculty members, and employees at the University of Tripoli organized a demonstration in support of Palestine. In January 2025, dozens of Libyans in Tripoli, Misrata and other cities organized protests when an interview by the Government of National Unity's former Foreign Minister, Najla El Mangoush was broadcast on Al Jazeera, in which she said the government of Prime Minister Abdul Hamid Dbeibeh had coordinated her secret meeting with Israeli Foreign Minister Eli Cohen in Rome in August 2023.

=== Malawi ===
In November 2023, hundreds of people in Blantyre protested against Israel's war on Gaza.

=== Mauritania ===
In October 2023, hundreds of people joined a pro-Palestine rally and marched through Nouakchott.

=== Morocco ===
On 19 November, protests were held in Tangier in support of Palestine, demanding an end to the normalization of ties between Morocco and Israel. A similar protest was held in Casablanca on 26 November. Protesters in February 2024 called for the end of normalization with Israel, holding banners that read, "Normalisation is treason". In Rabat, thousands marched in solidarity with the Palestinian people. On 28 June, protests were held in Tangier after Morocco granted an Israeli warship entry to its port. Demonstrations were also held in Fez, Meknes, Kenitra, Agadir, Berkane, Oujda and Jerada. Protesters held banners and chanted slogans in support of Palestinians. On 6 October 2024, a large demonstration broke out in Rabat with people calling for the end of normalization with Israel. On 20 April 2025, nearly 1,000 people in Tangier protested against a planned docking of a Maersk cargo ship that was carrying parts of Lockheed Martin F-35 Lightning II aircraft to Israel.

=== Nigeria ===
Around 50,000 protesters held a rally expressing solidarity with Palestine organized by the Conference of Islamic Organisations at Gani Fawehinmi Park, Lagos on 21 October. They demanded the Nigerian government halt the diplomatic relations with Israel until a two-state solution was reached. Hundreds of members of the Islamic Movement of Nigeria protested on the streets of Kaduna against Israel's invasion of Gaza on 16 November. The protest resulted in clashes with police that left one person dead and several others injured. Police and the IMN both blamed each other for the death. Another INM protest in Abuja on 28 March 2025 resulted in clashes with police that left five INM members and one police officer dead.

=== Senegal ===
On 4 November 2023, 200 protesters gathered outside the Grand Mosque in Dakar carrying the Palestinian flag and placards denouncing genocide in Gaza. On 4 May 2024, pro-Palestinian marches and demonstrations were held in Dakar. On 26 May, hundreds protested at the Palestinian embassy in Dakar.

On 13 April 2025, hundreds of people gathered at a pro-Palestine demonstration in Dakar to protest against Israel's actions in Gaza. On 27 May, Israel's ambassador to Senegal, Yuval Waks, was forced to leave Cheikh Anta Diop University after students protested his presence for a conference on international relations.

=== Seychelles ===
On 27 January 2024, members of the 'Seychelles for Palestine' organised a peaceful march in Victoria, calling for a ceasefire in Gaza.

=== Somalia ===
On 20 October 2023, Somalis took to the streets in Mogadishu to protest the Israeli attacks on the Gaza Strip and to show solidarity with Palestinians, shouting slogans such as "Stop the war crime", "Free Free Palestine", and "We demand an end to the genocide in Gaza, Palestine."

On 25 July 2025, as a part of the Gaza day of action protests erupted in Mogadishu with protestors chanting against Israel's starvation of Gaza.

=== South Africa ===
Hundreds marched in Cape Town on 13 October to protest against Israeli attacks on the Gaza Strip. In an address to the crowd. Mandla Mandela, a grandson of Nelson Mandela, called on President Cyril Ramaphosa to speak on the Gaza war at the UN General Assembly and act on the crisis.

On 11 November, thousands marched in Cape Town demanding the expulsion of the Israeli ambassador and the closure of the Israeli embassy. On 11 January 2024, a statue of Desmond Tutu wearing a keffiyeh was erected in Cape Town. On 13 January, protesters marched to the US consulate in Johannesburg to demand a ceasefire.

=== Tanzania ===
In July 2024, several activists and influencers in Zanzibar showed solidarity with Palestinians.

=== Tunisia ===
Thousands gathered outside the French embassy in Tunis to protest Western support for Israel, chanting that "the French and the Americans are partners in the attack" against Palestinians. Some expressed support for Hamas by shouting,wp "Dear (Ezzedine) al-Qassam (Brigades), destroy Tel Aviv", in reference to the movement's military wing. A similar protest occurred outside the US embassy in Tunis' northern suburbs. An estimated 3,000 people participated in the demonstrations. On 31 July 2024, a crowd marched in Sfax in support of Palestine, Another protest was held in Tunis after the assassination of Hamas leader Ismail Haniyeh.

== Asia ==
=== Afghanistan ===
On 13 October, demonstrators gathered at the Eidgah Mosque in Kabul to express support for Palestine.

=== Azerbaijan ===
In November 2024, dozens of people gathered at the 2024 United Nations Climate Change Conference in Baku to express solidarity with Palestine and call for a ceasefire in Gaza.

=== Bangladesh ===
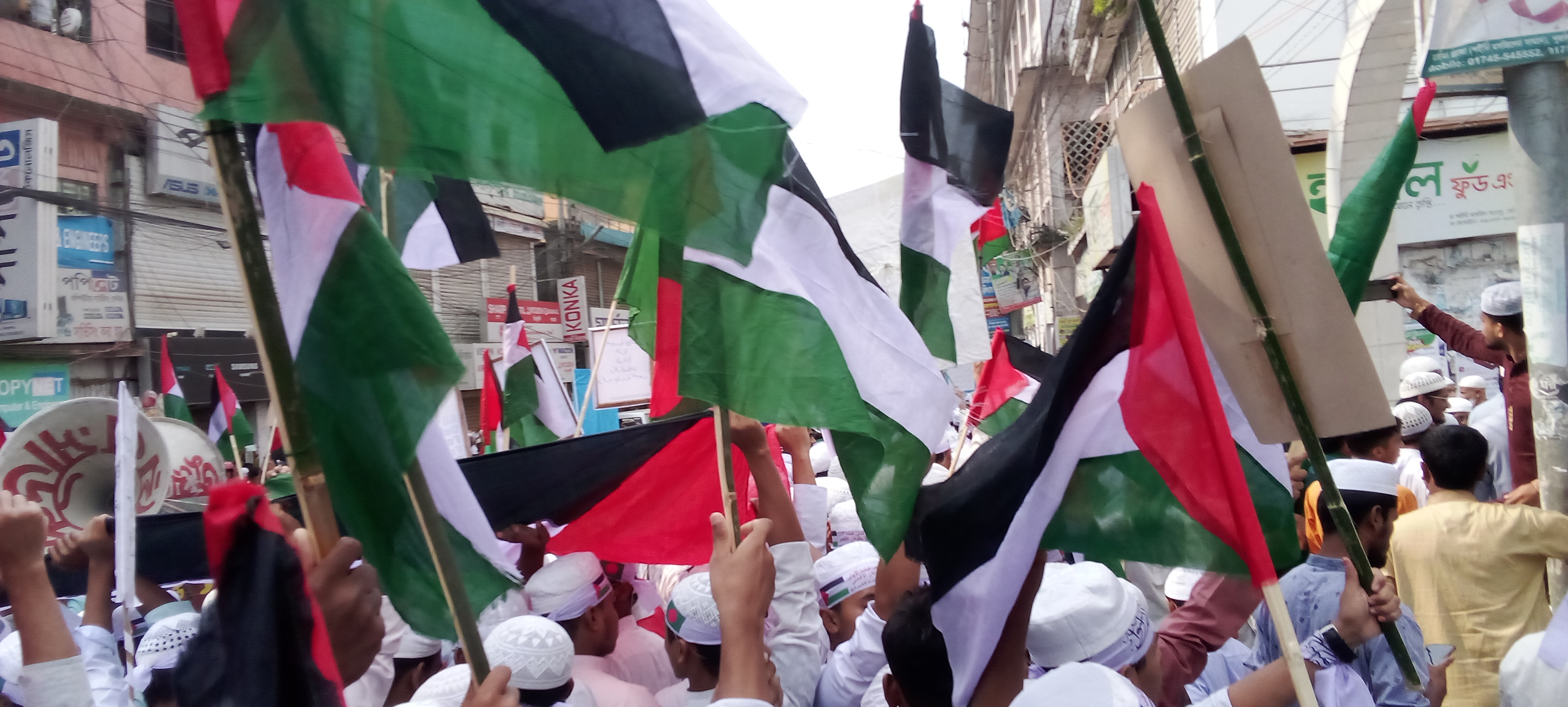
Pro-Palestine protest in Kishoreganj, Bangladesh

Activists from Islami Andolan Bangladesh staged protests against Israel's military actions in Gaza and expressed their solidarity with the Palestinian people in front of the Baitul Mukarram National Mosque in Dhaka. The protesters held banners reading "Free Palestine" and "Stop Genocide". On 9 May 2024, protests were held in Dhaka demanding the end of the "genocide in Palestine".

On 7 April 2025, nationwide protests were held in solidarity with the "Global Strike for Gaza" campaign. Many educational institutions voluntarily closed to support the global "No Work, No School" campaign. Protests were also held in front of the US Embassy in Dhaka, after which the embassy issued a "protest alert" for Americans residing in Bangladesh.

On 12 April, Bangladesh held the largest ever pro-Palestine protest in history, gaining over 1,000,000 participants in Suhrawardy Udyan, Dhaka.

=== Brunei ===
On 6 November 2023, more than 8,000 people gathered for a peace walk in Taman Mahkota Jubli Emas to show solidarity with the Palestinians. On 12 November, around 80 people held a march in Kampong Kapok to show solidarity with the Palestinians.

=== Cambodia ===
In September 2024 during Pchum Ben, more than 100 people gathered in Phnom Penh to express solidary with the people of Palestine.

=== China ===
In Chinese media interviews with students who just finished the 2024 Gaokao (China's national undergraduate admission exam), some students expressed prayers for peace in the Middle East and solidarity with Palestine. Videos posted online showed students displaying the Palestinian flag or stating in interviews that "from the river to the sea, Palestine will be free." By the last day of the exam, many of the original interview clips had been taken down, but clips that were later reposted by individual netizens were not deleted.

==== Hong Kong ====
On 4 November 2023, five anti-war activists rallied near Hong Kong's Israeli consulate, displaying a list of thousands of Palestinians killed by Israel's bombardment of the Gaza Strip. The activists were from HK Anti-war Mobilization and gathered in Admiralty, holding signs reading "Stand with Palestine," whilst chanting "Israeli army destroyed Gaza." Plainclothes police officers were on the scene, as the activists held a three-minute silence.

On 8 November 2025, three activists protested at Emperor Cinemas in Times Square to demonstrate against the Hong Kong Jewish Film Festival, calling for a boycott of the "artwashing" of Israel's war in Gaza.

=== Georgia ===
In October 2023, a pro-Israel rally was held at the Great Synagogue in Tbilisi to express solidarity with Israel. On 31 October, about a hundred people attended a pro-Palestine rally in Marneuli to protest against Israel's actions in Gaza.

=== India ===
On 13 October, pro-Palestinian protests erupted in three cities. In Hyderabad, people chanted slogans like "Long live Palestine" and "Gaza will never die" and police, upon arriving on the scene, broke up the protest and removed demonstrators from the spot. In Budgam district, Jammu and Kashmir, protesters chanted slogans against Israel and the United States, one of which was "We stand with Palestine". To avoid unrest, the main mosque in Srinagar was closed during Friday prayers. In Lucknow, a cleric accused Israel of committing war crimes on Palestine and appealed to Prime Minister Narendra Modi to intervene in the war and bring a halt to the hostilities in Gaza. Pro-Palestinian rallies later experienced a crackdown by Indian police while pro-Israeli protests were allowed.

Several pro-Palestinian demonstrators were also detained while trying to protest in Delhi.

On 26 October, a pro-Palestine rally was held in Kozhikode, Kerala, which drew 200,000 people and was organized by the Indian Union Muslim League. Another rally on 11 November drew 50,000 participants and was organized by the Communist Party of India (Marxist) and inaugurated by Chief Minister Pinarayi Vijayan, during which he denounced what he called the "Zionist bias" of the Modi government and called on it to sever military agreements and diplomatic relations with Israel.

On 20 August 2025, hundreds of people attended a pro-Palestine protest led by the Communist Party of India at Azad Maidan in Mumbai, demanding an end of the genocide in Gaza.

On 19 September, more than 5,000 people joined a pro-Palestine rally in Pudupet, Chennai to protest against Israel's actions in Gaza. The event was organised by the Coalition of Periyarists with demonstrators chanted "Free Palestine" and "Free Tamil Eelam".

=== Indonesia ===
Abu Bakar Ba'asyir, one of the suspects of the 2002 Bali bombings, joined protests in Solo. In a speech with protesters holding Palestinian flags, he said that "we cannot be weak in facing Israel" and that "hopefully, amongst these young people, there are some ready to be sent to (Palestinian territories)". On 20 October, around 300 members of the Solidarity Committee for Palestine and Yemen held a pro-Palestine protest in front of the US Embassy in Jakarta and later marched into the UN Office. The Indonesian Coalition to Defend Baitul Maqdis carried a protest in solidarity for Palestine on 28 October in front of the US Embassy. In Palu, 500 people held a protest expressing support for Palestine in front of a McDonald's restaurant on 27 October and demanded to meet the management.

More than two million people participated in the pro-Palestinian rally organized by the Indonesian People's Alliance to Defend Palestine at the National Monument on 5 November. The rally was attended by officials such as foreign minister Retno Marsudi, religious affairs minister Yaqut Cholil Qoumas, and education minister Muhadjir Effendy, parliament speaker Puan Maharani, former Jakarta governor Anies Baswedan, former Vice President Jusuf Kalla, former parliament speaker Amien Rais, and former Muhammadiyah chairperson Din Syamsuddin.

On 12 November, pro-Palestinian rallies were held in Bekasi, Cimahi, Pekalongan, Surabaya, and Surakarta. The Muslim Solidarity Front held a pro-Palestine rally in Bitung on 25 November, resulting in clashes with the pro-Israel organization Pasukan Manguni Makasiouw.

On 13 January 2024, thousands of people rallied at the US embassy in Jakarta as a part of the "global day of action". On 3 August 2024, people gathered at the US embassy in Jakarta to express their support for Palestinians after the assassination of Ismail Haniyeh.

On 6 October 2024, people rallied in Jakarta in solidarity with Palestine and Lebanon during Israel's incursion.

On 15 June 2025, a pro-Palestine rally was held in Jakarta to protest against Israel's attacks on Gaza.

On 22 November 2025, Indonesia’s biggest Islamic organisation, Nahdlatul Ulama, called on its chairman Yahya Cholil Staquf to resign for inviting an American scholar known for his staunch support of Israel.

=== Japan ===
On 11 October, a pro-Israel rally was held in the Shibuya district of Tokyo attended by Israeli diplomats.

Members of the Japanese Muslim community demonstrated in front of the Israeli Embassy in Tokyo holding signs and chanting slogans such as "Israel, Terrorists" and "Free Palestine". There were also demonstrations in Kyoto on 19 November.

On 20 November, around 1,500 protesters demonstrated in Tokyo calling for a ceasefire to "Save Gaza". In December, about 1,200 people gathered in Tokyo to march in support of Israel.

On 13 January 2024, as part of the "global day of action", hundreds gathered in Tokyo to protest against the Israeli war in Gaza and demanded a ceasefire. A single protester in Tokyo has demonstrated alone for three months since November 2023 holding a banner reading "Stop Gaza Genocide".

On 4 February, more than 50 pro-Palestinian protesters marched to call for a ceasefire in front of the Atomic Bomb Dome in Hiroshima.

On 11 May, hundreds of demonstrators marched at a pro-Palestine rally in Shibuya in Tokyo. Some chanted "From the river to the sea, Palestine will be free."

On 15 July, dozens of people participated in a march in solidarity with Gaza in Namba, Osaka Prefecture.

On 31 July, Nagasaki mayor Shiro Suzuki disinvited representatives from Israel from the upcoming 79th annual commemoration of the US atomic bombing on the city. Ambassadors to Japan Rahm Emanuel and Julia Longbottom from the U.S. and U.K. respectively, refused to attend the Nagasaki ceremony in counter-protest.

On 5 August, a large protest occurred in Hiroshima accusing Prime Minister Fumio Kishida of being complicit with the genocide in Gaza. On 6 August, the anniversary of the Atomic bombing of Hiroshima, the city government banned gatherings in Peace Park and in front of the Atomic Bomb Dome because of the protests.

=== Kyrgyzstan ===
On 29 October 300 people joined the Palestinian community in Bishkek in demonstrations funded by an Islamic publisher, Islamskiy Zhurnal Umma.

=== Malaysia ===
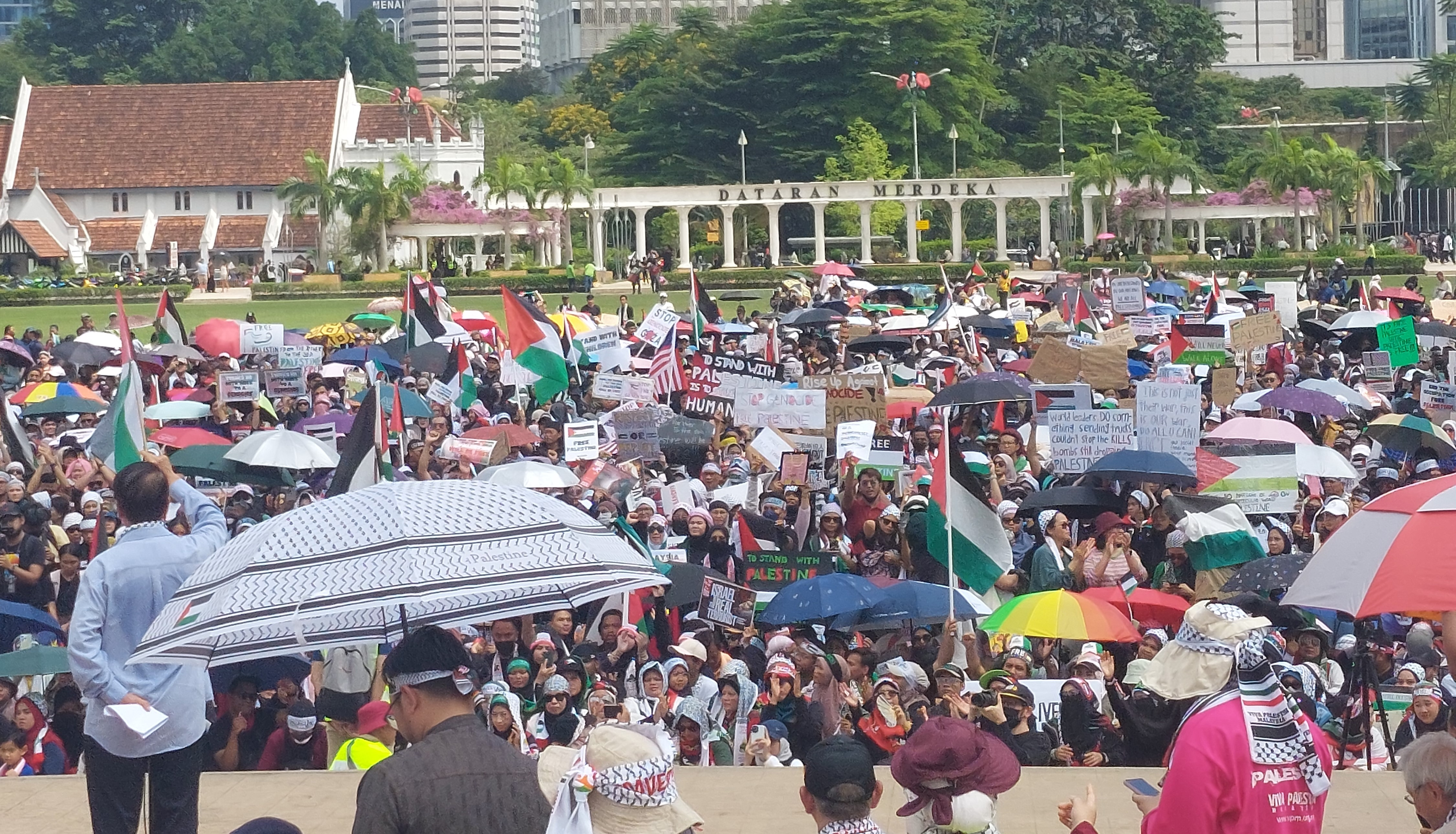
Protest opposed to Israeli action in Gaza, 22 October, Kuala Lumpur

Around 15,000 people gathered in Kuala Lumpur to express their disapproval of Israel's air attacks and land assault on Gaza. Protesters wore Palestinian keffiyeh scarves and raised placards with the words "Israel cuak" (meaning "Israel is frightened"). Additionally, two effigies covered in the Israeli flag were burned while the crowd chanted "Hidup Palestin" (meaning "long live Palestine") and "Hancur Zionist" (meaning "crush the Zionists"). 1,000 Muslims marched in Kuala Lumpur and 5,000 people marched in Sungai Petani following Friday prayers to demonstrate support for Palestine on 13 October. Nearly a thousand people demonstrated outside the US embassy in Kuala Lumpur on 13 January 2024; waving Palestinian flags. On 12 October, about 7,000 people attended a pro-Palestine march towards the US embassy to mark the one-year anniversary of the Gaza war.

In May 2025, more than 1,000 people marched through the streets of Kuala Lumpur and chanted "Free Palestine" and "Stop the genocide" to mark the 77th anniversary of the Nakba. On 21 June, thousands of people attended a pro-Palestine rally known as Himpunan 10K Malam Untukmu Palestin at the Sultan Muhammad IV Stadium in Kota Bharu, Kelantan. On 16 August, more than 70 people gathered at Dataran Merdeka to show solidarity and commemorate the journalists killed in Gaza. On 2 October, more than 3,000 people marched to the US embassy in Kuala Lumpur, demanding the release of Malaysian activists of the Global Sumud Flotilla intercepted by Israeli forces. On 10 October, more than 1,000 boats by members of fishing associations in Tumpat, Kota Bharu, Bachok, and Kuala Besut took part in a convoy on the Kelantan River in Kota Bharu to show solidarity with the people of Gaza.

=== Maldives ===
On 13 October 2023, hundreds of Maldivians attended a pro-Palestine rally in Malé as a response to Israel's actions in Gaza.

=== Nepal ===
On 10 October 2023, demonstrators outside the prime minister's office called for the evacuation of Nepalis in Israel. On 20 October 2023, protesters outside of the Israeli embassy called for a ceasefire. Participants included former Prime Minister Baburam Bhattarai and Nepal Socialist Party leader Hisila Yami. On 30 October 2023, protesters in Patan Durbar Square in Kathmandu called for a ceasefire, holding banners reading "Indigenous People of Nepal are with Palestine" and "South-South Solidarity". On 31 October 2023, the Human Rights and Peace Society organized a demonstration outside the United Nations office in Lalitpur calling on the organization to take action to protect civilian lives in Gaza and to release all hostages held by Hamas, including Nepali hostage Bipin Joshi. On 29 March 2024, doctors and healthcare workers from the Maharajgunj Medical Campus held a protest outside the Israeli embassy, condemning the killing of over 685 healthcare workers in Palestine and calling for a ceasefire.

=== Pakistan ===
On 13 October 2023, public gatherings expressing support for Palestine were held following Friday prayers. Various political and religious groups organized numerous protests in major cities such as Karachi, Lahore, Peshawar, and the capital Islamabad. American and Israeli flags were burned in the demonstrations. On 13 January 2024, As a part of the "global day of action", large crowds gathered in front of the Lahore Press Club to protest against the war and call for a permanent ceasefire.

Thousands of people, comprising women and children, assembled in Islamabad for the biggest pro-Palestine demonstration in Pakistan since the commencement of Israel's conflict with Gaza in October. Demonstrators in Karachi displayed Palestinian flags and donned the keffiyeh during a gathering arranged by Jamaat-e-Islami Pakistan, the nation's biggest religious political group. On 3 August 2024, Jamaat-e-Islami Pakistan arranged another demonstrations in Rawalpindi which takes place after the assassination of Ismail Haniyeh.

On 13 April 2025, Jamaat-e-Islami organized the Gaza Solidarity March in Karachi.

=== Philippines ===
In Mindanao, protests were held in Marawi in solidarity with the Palestinians on 10 October. On 16 October, 12,000–25,000 protesters took part in the Bangsamoro Rally for Free Palestine in Cotabato City. They also called for neighboring Arab countries to open their borders to refugees and for the United States to take a neutral stance on the issue. Another grand solidarity rally was held on 19 October where various Moro groups in Marawi condemned the hospital explosion in Gaza

Various leftist organizations, including Bayan Muna and Gabriela Women's Party, also launched separate demonstrations in support of Palestine and urged for the end of Israel's occupation. A demonstration on 31 October held by 500 protesters from Bagong Alyansang Makabayan at the Israeli embassy in Taguig reiterated support for Palestine, condemnation of genocide and what it called the subservience of the Philippine government to the United States. The protesters at Taguig clashed with local police. In response, Israeli ambassador Ilan Fluss insisted on Israel's right to defend itself and that the conflict was against Hamas rather than Palestine. He also equated Hamas to Islamic State. Two hundred people from left-wing groups held another protest at the US embassy in Manila on 14 November reiterating their solidarity with Palestinians and accusing the US of bearing "overwhelming responsibility" in the Gaza war. They also clashed with the local police.

Filipino Christians from various churches and organizations held a prayer vigil at the Philippine-Israel Friendship Marker at the Quezon Memorial Circle in Quezon City in solidarity with Israel and civilian casualties. Students at the University of the Philippines protested in support of a ceasefire.

A march was held from Luneta to the CCP Complex in Manila on 25 November to call for a ceasefire and an end to Israel's siege of Gaza.

=== Singapore ===
On 2 February 2024, two separate events took place in support of Palestine, one of which involved "a group of about 70 people" gathering along Orchard Road and marching toward the Istana to deliver 130 letters to Prime Minister Lee Hsien Loong while carrying umbrellas with watermelon patterns. In response, the police investigated the event as a public assembly organised without a permit, and warned against calls for similar protests at the upcoming Singapore Airshow. On 27 June, three women were charged with organising a procession in a prohibited area in relation to the February 2024 Orchard Road march as well as for sending over 140 letters to the prime minister, urging him to cut ties with Israel. They were acquitted on 22 October 2025 after a judge ruled that the defendants were unaware that they were holding the event in a prohibited area. Later in April 2026, the three women were later fined S$3,000 ($2,300) each by the High Court for their actions.

On the evening of 15 April, a group of three people held a banner with the text "End SG – Israel arms trade" from the OCBC Skyway at Gardens by the Bay.

=== South Korea ===
On 17 October, around 500 Israelis and South Koreans gathered in central Seoul to show solidarity with Israel. On 17 November, civic groups in Seoul laid out 2,000 pairs of shoes to symbolize the deaths of innocent civilians killed in Gaza, the occupied West Bank and Israel. On 13 January 2024, as a part of the "global day of action", protestors marched in Seoul demanding a ceasefire and an end to the Israeli war on Gaza. On 20 July dozens of South Koreans in Incheon rallied in solidarity with Gaza.

=== Sri Lanka ===
On 13 October, protesters held signs that read "Palestine you will never walk alone".

On 14 November 159 Parliament members signed an open letter to UN secretary-general António Guterres demanding "necessary steps to be imposed on Israel to stop its onslaught, oppressions, and aggressions" against the Palestinian people; they also appealed to Western countries to stop supporting Israel and conform to international law "without hypocrisy and double standard".

In December 2023, protesters expressed disappointment and frustration over their government's choice to dispatch migrant workers to Israel.

=== Taiwan ===
Protests in Taiwan, in support for both Israel and Palestine has been ongoing since the start of the war.

On 13 April 2025, civic and minor political groups in Taiwan such as the Taiwan Obasang Political Equality Party and the Green Party Taiwan, demonstrated against the war in Gaza. Demonstrators marched to the Ministry of Foreign Affairs, calling on the government to defend human rights and freedom, issued an official statement condemning Israel's action, terminating all cooperation with Israel and ceased providing technology and materials to Israel for its war on Gaza.

=== Thailand ===
On 22 October 2023, hundreds of Thai Muslims and Palestinians protested outside of Israeli embassy in Bangkok to protest against Israel's actions in Gaza. On 19 May 2024, about 60 people joined in a pro-Palestine rally outside the British, German and American embassies to protest of the countries' alleged support for Israel. The protest was organized by THAI for Palestine, the Palestine Solidarity Campaign (PSC) Thailand and Socialist Thai. On 4 October 2025, several pro-Palestine protestors marched through Bangkok, demanding the suspension of Thai labor deployment to Israel, the prompt cancellation of all arms sales and defense agreements with Israel, and the vetting of all Israeli visitors for any links to the IDF.

=== Uzbekistan ===
On 29 October 2023, around 100 people gathered at Amir Timur Square in Tashkent to express solidarity with Palestine. Shortly after the demonstration, more than a hundred people were taken into custody by the police. The majority were shortly released afterwards, but three people were jailed for 15 days.

== Europe ==
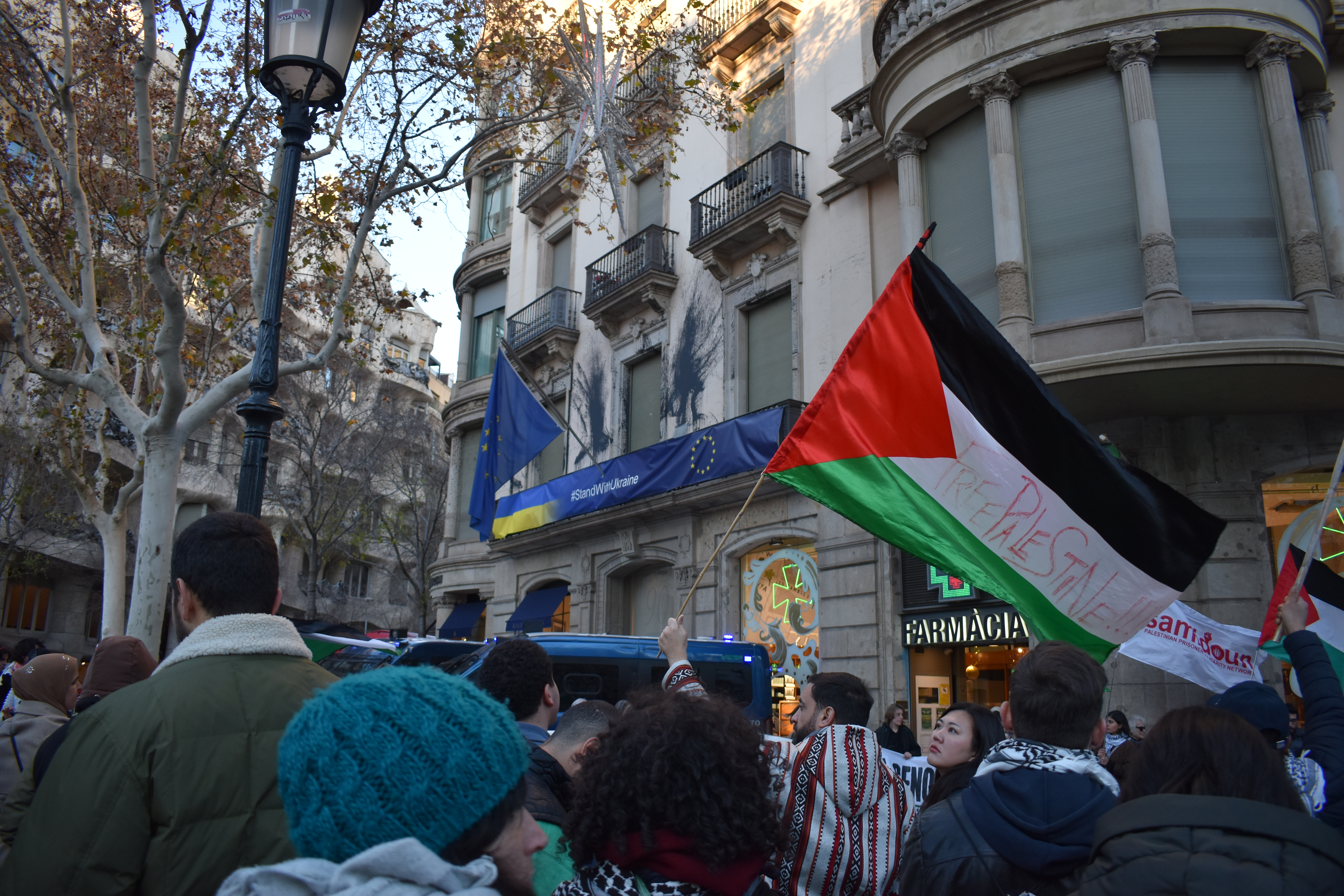
Protest in front of the European Commission branch in Barcelona, 7 January 2024

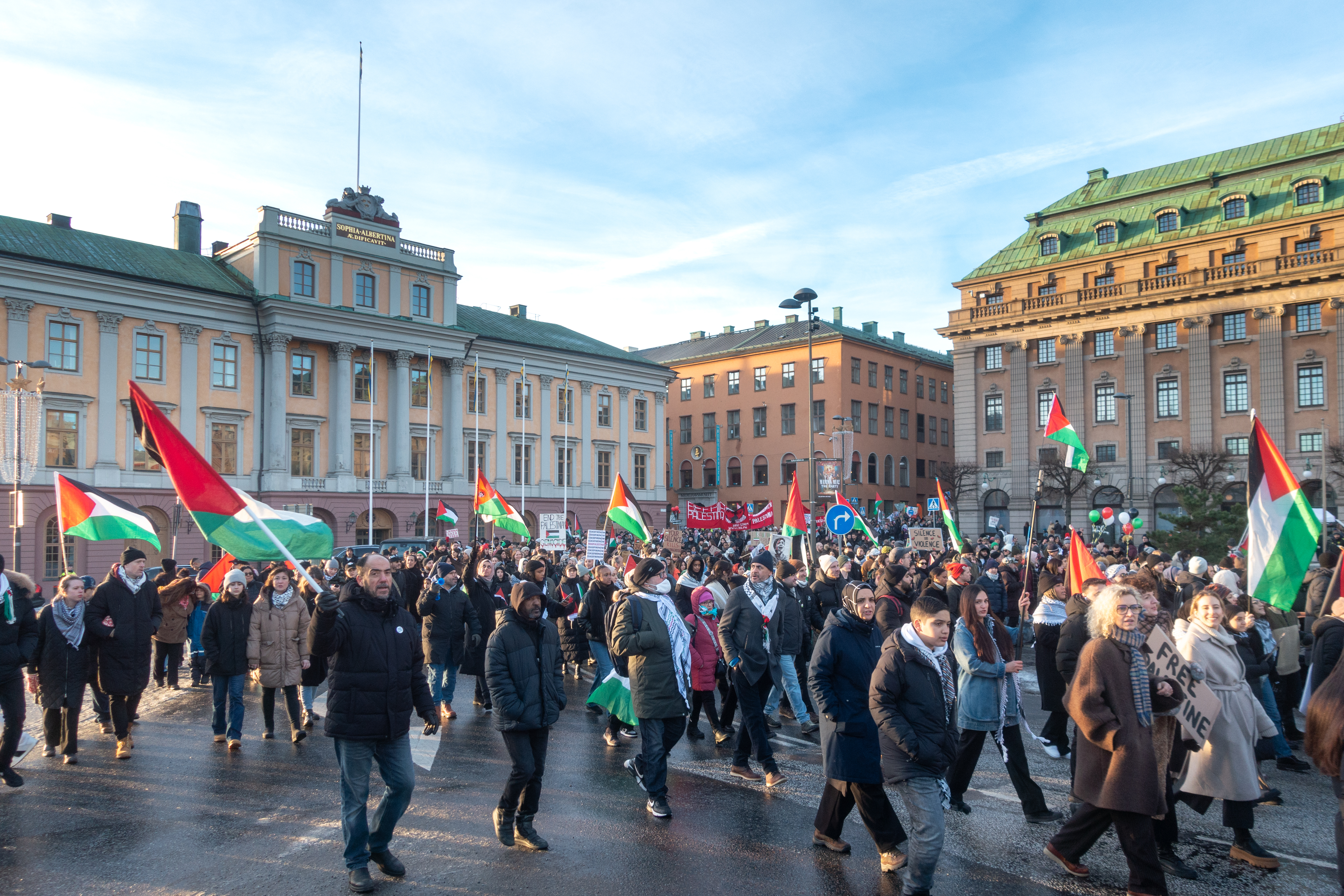
Pro-Palestinian protest in central Stockholm, Sweden, 27 January 2024

=== Albania ===
On 20 October 2023, a rally was held in Skanderbeg Square in the capital Tirana in support of Palestine and the Palestinian people. Protestors condemned Israel's attacks on Palestinians and called for an end to the Israeli occupation of Palestine and for the implementation of the two-state solution.

In April 2025, a demonstration took place in Tirana against the visit of Albanian Prime Minister Edi Rama to Israel. In August 2025, some 300 Muslim religious leaders issued an open letter condemning Israeli actions as genocide, called for boycotts of companies involved in the war, solidarity with Palestinians and global action by the Muslim world.

=== Austria ===
On 13 January 2024, a pro-Palestine march was held in Vienna as part of the "global day of action". Demonstrators carried Palestinian flags and also banners that read: "Hands off Rafah", "Immediate cease-fire" and "Stop the genocide in Gaza". On 29 June 2024, protests were held in Vienna carrying Palestinian flags and banners and demanding an end to the bombardment of Gaza.

=== Belgium ===
On 10 December 2023, about 4,000 people in Brussels waved Belgian flags and demonstrated against antisemitism amid concern over the rising number of antisemitic incidents in Europe from the Gaza war. On 18 December, 27,000 demonstrators marched in Brussels on a national march calling for an immediate and permanent ceasefire in Gaza.

On 21 January 2024, protesters in Brussels demonstrated against the war and called for a permanent ceasefire. Ahead of a foreign ministers meeting in Brussels, a group of 100 prominent people, including former Irish president Mary Robinson and former Swedish foreign minister Margot Wallström, called on the EU to prevent the "unprecedented rate of civilian killing" in Gaza.

In January 2025, around 7,000 demonstrators marched on the streets in Brussels, calling for a permanent ceasefire in Gaza and sanctions against Israel. Another pro-Palestine demonstration was carried out in Brussels on 7 September, with between 70,000, and 120,000 in attendance.

=== Bosnia and Herzegovina ===
On 22 October, thousands marched in Sarajevo in support of Gaza, chanting, "Yesterday Srebrenica, today Gaza", referring to the 1995 massacre of 8,000 Muslim men and boys. Several thousand people gathered in Sarajevo, waving Palestinian and Bosnian flags and demanding a halt to the Israeli offensive into Gaza.

On 7 July 2024, demonstrations were held in Mostar, denouncing the genocide in Gaza; demonstrators placed a Palestinian flag on the Stari Most over the Neretva river.

=== Bulgaria ===
On 13 October 2023, Bulgarians and Palestinians gathered in front of the National Palace of Culture in Sofia to express solidarity with Palestinians, despite the city council banning the protest.

=== Croatia ===
In April 2024, pro-Palestinian demonstrators staged a protest in front of the German Embassy in Zagreb over the German government's perceived complicity in Israel's killing of Palestinians in Gaza.

=== Cyprus ===
On 15 October, a pro-Palestinian protest was held in Larnaca. On 19 October, a protest in support of Gaza was held in Nicosia. On 20 October, another pro-Palestinian protest was organised by the Cyprus Peace Council, attended by 2,000 protestors as well as MPs, mayors, the general secretary of AKEL and the Palestinian ambassador to Cyprus. On 17 October, a pro-Israel rally was organised by the Israeli community. Protests were held at the UK's RAF Akrotiri base on 14 and 15 January 2024 after the base was used to launch airstrikes on Yemen. The protesters carried a banner demanding a "Ceasefire" while another read "Stop funding genocide".

=== Czech Republic ===
On 20 January 2024, between 1,200 and 1,400 people marched through the streets of Prague in support of Palestine. Another pro-Palestinian protest was held on 23 July, where several protestors blocked the entrance of the Representation of the European Commission in the Czech Republic, demanding a ceasefire in Gaza.

In March 2026, a warehouse in Pardubice owned by drone manufacturer LPP Holding was destroyed in an arson attack. No injuries were reported. The Earthquake Faction claimed responsibility for the attack, stating that it targeted the facility because of LPP Holding's planned cooperation with Israeli defence company Elbit Systems. The group described the attack as a protest against Israel's actions in Gaza. Authorities later detained ten suspects in several countries and charged them with terrorism-related offenses carrying penalties of up to 20 years' imprisonment.

=== Denmark ===
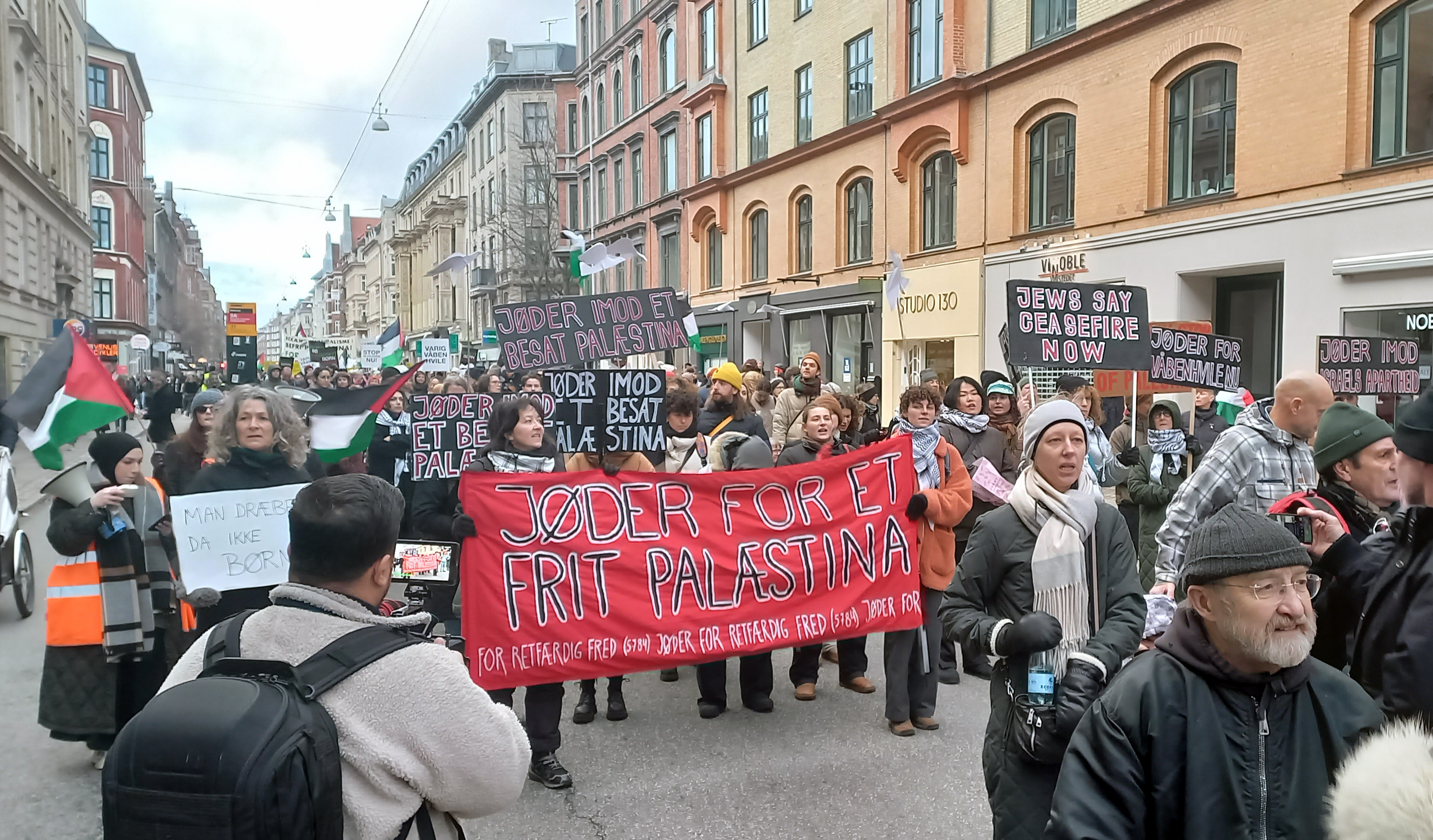
"Jews for a free Palestine" banner in Copenhagen, 2 February 2024

Protesters marched in support of Gaza in Copenhagen on 2 February 2024, chanting "Free Palestine" and "Palestine will never die". The protesters called for an end to Israel's military attacks in Gaza. They also described the conflict as a genocide and urged politicians to step up their efforts in aiding the Palestinian populace.

On 6 October 2024, people rallied in Copenhagen in solidarity with Palestine and Lebanon during Israel's incursion into Lebanese territory.

On 24 August 2025, more than 10,000 people joined a pro-Palestine demonstration in Copenhagen, calling for an end of the war and urging the government to recognise Palestine as a state.

=== Estonia ===
On 5 November 2023, a pro-Palestine demonstration was peacefully held in Tallinn to express support of Palestine and calling for the Estonian government to condemn Israel's actions.

=== Finland ===
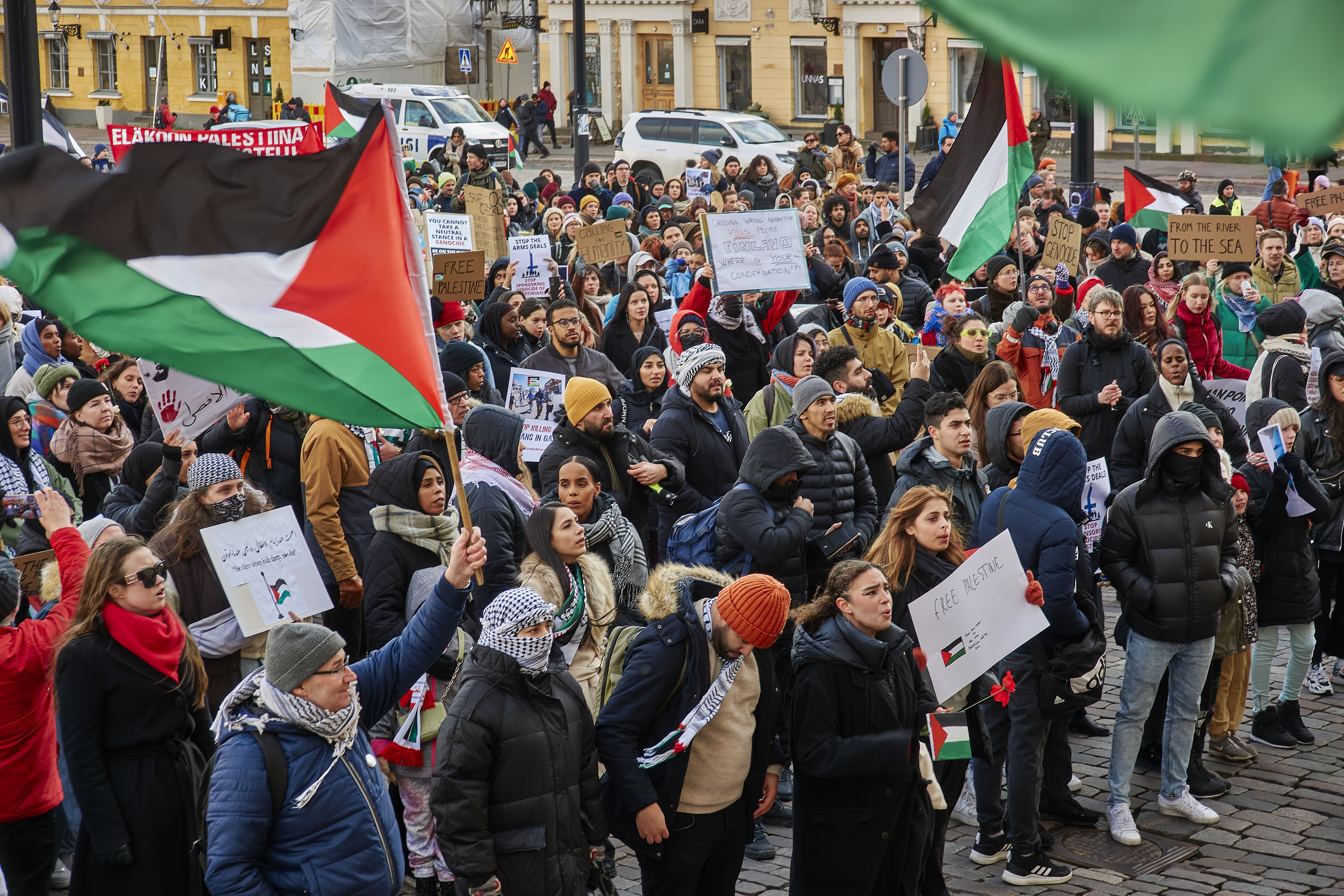
Pro-Palestinian protest in Helsinki, Finland, 21 October 2023

On 19 November 2023, an estimated 4,000 people participated in a march in support of the Palestinian people in Helsinki. The march also called for an end to Israeli military action in Gaza and criticised the Finnish government's agreement to purchase a missile defense system from Israel. In January 2024, 79 Finnish diplomats signed a letter to Foreign Minister Elina Valtonen, criticising the official response to the Israeli attacks on Gaza. In February 2024, it was reported that participants would gather in Mannerheimintie in Helsinki to protest, although authorities had not granted permission for any demonstrations.

=== France ===
In the night preceding 12 October 2023, police fired tear gas and water cannons to disperse hundreds of pro-Palestinian demonstrators in Paris on a banned pro-Palestinian rally.

On Thursday, 12 October 2023, in response to former Hamas leader Khaled Mashal calling Muslims worldwide to stage protests in support of Palestinians in a "day of rage" on Friday 13 October, the French Interior Minister Gérald Darmanin imposed a ban on pro-Palestinian demonstrations because he expected such rallies to "disrupt public order". The same day, the Representative Council of French Jewish Institutions organized a pro-Israel rally. After Darmanin's ban on pro-Palestinian demonstrations, French President Emmanuel Macron, in a televised national address on the same day, urged restraint to France's Muslims and Jews, urging all citizens to refrain from bringing the conflict to France.

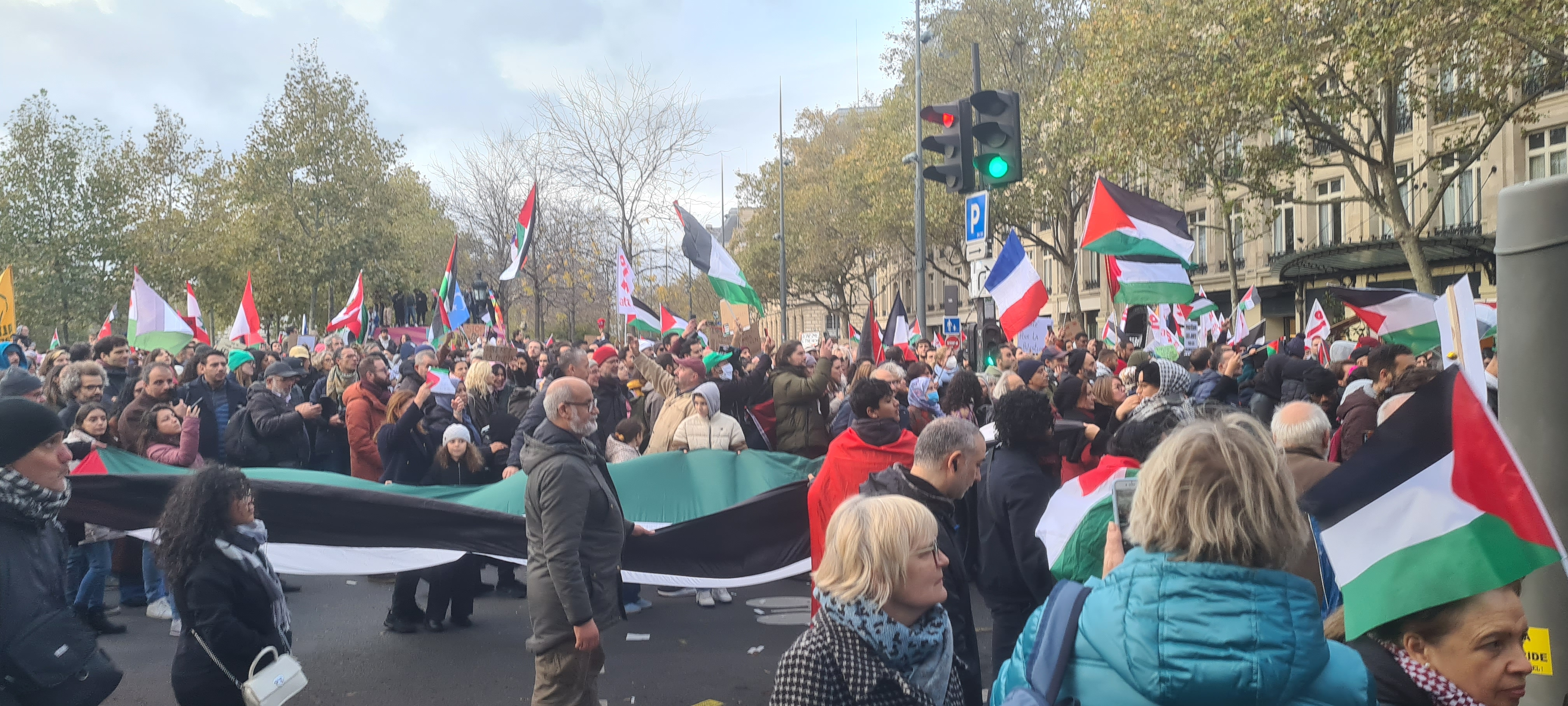
Demonstration 11 November 2023 to cease fire in Gaza in Paris, France

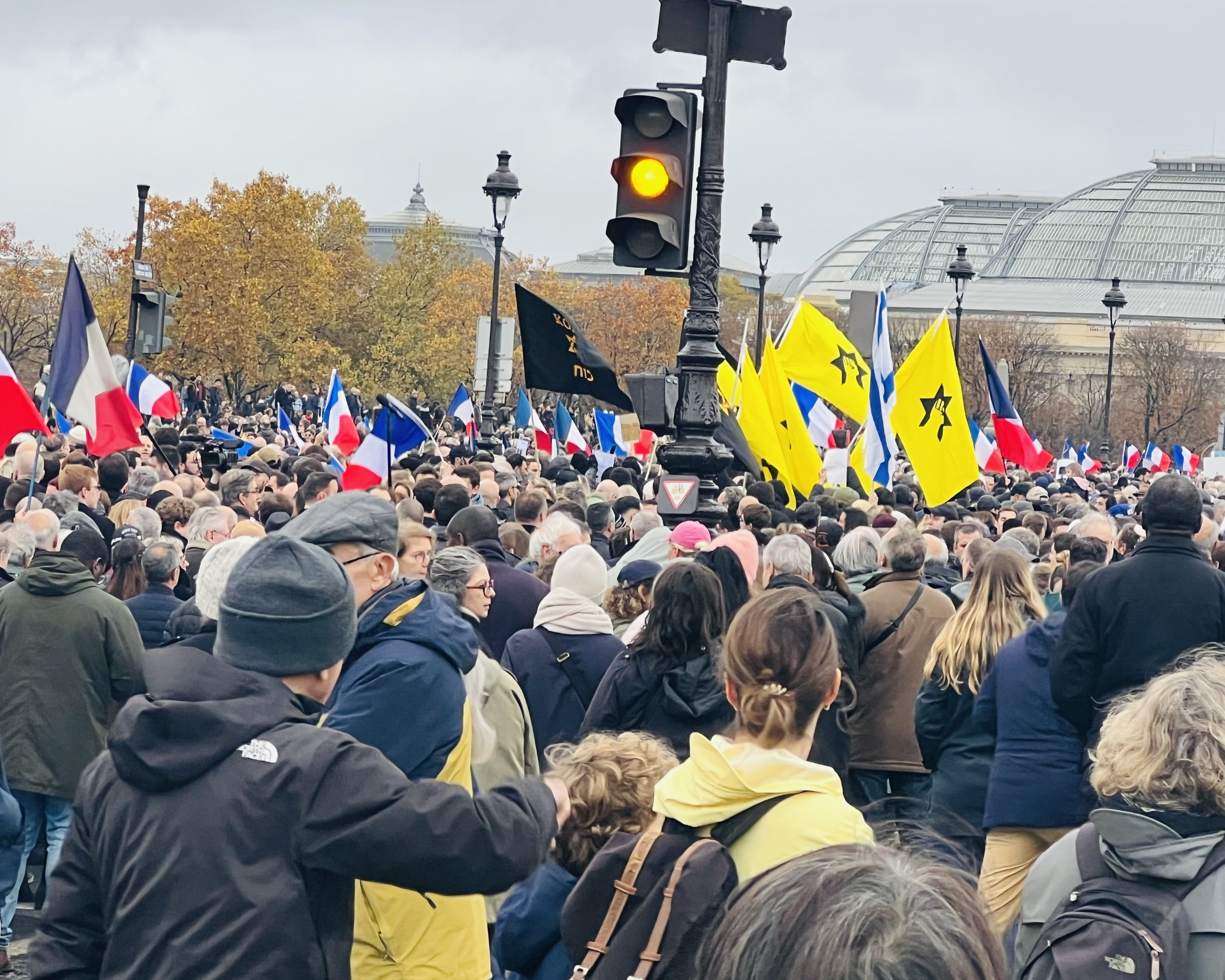
March for the Republic and Against Antisemitism in Paris, 12 November

On 14 October 2023, French-Algerian journalist Taha Bouhafs was arrested while covering a pro-Palestine protest in Paris. He told +972 Magazine that people were getting "strangled by the police", and that the police fined him for participating in an "illegal demonstration" despite showing his press card. He also claimed that the police threatened to break his legs if they saw him again at a protest.

On 22 October 2023, France held its first authorized pro-Palestine rally, drawing 15,000 participants who chanted: "Gaza, Paris is with you". On 12 November, over 100,000 people protested in response to the recent rise in antisemitism in Paris. Prime Minister Élisabeth Borne, the heads of France's upper and lower houses of parliament, former presidents François Hollande and Nicolas Sarkozy, and several leading politicians joined the demonstrators. The presence of the far-right National Rally leader Marine Le Pen, whose party has a history of antisemitism, caused criticism from some participants such as Borne, who is the daughter of Holocaust survivors.

On 21 January 2024, Paris police stopped and dispersed an automobile parade waving Palestinian flags. On 22 January, MP Louis Boyard was verbally assaulted and threatened by a pro-Israeli activist. A demonstration of hundreds of protestors occurred in Marseille in support of Palestine on 18 February.

On 25 April 2024, students from Sorbonne University called on the French government to help Palestinians. On 15, May people gathered around the Sorbonne to commemorate Nakba Day.

On 13 November 2024, violent protests erupted in Paris during a far-right pro-Israel gala that Israeli Finance Minister Bezalel Smotrich was scheduled to attend. The protests occurred on the eve of a UEFA match featuring visiting Israeli team Maccabi Tel Aviv F.C., less than one week after riots during and after their last game in Amsterdam caused an international incident. Scuffles and altercations occurred during the match.

On 25 May 2025, nearly 4,000 people gathered at the Place de la République in Paris to show support for the Palestinians.

On 6 November 2025, four people were detained for disrupting a concert by the Israel Philharmonic Orchestra at the Philharmonie de Paris as part of protest actions against the war.

=== Germany ===
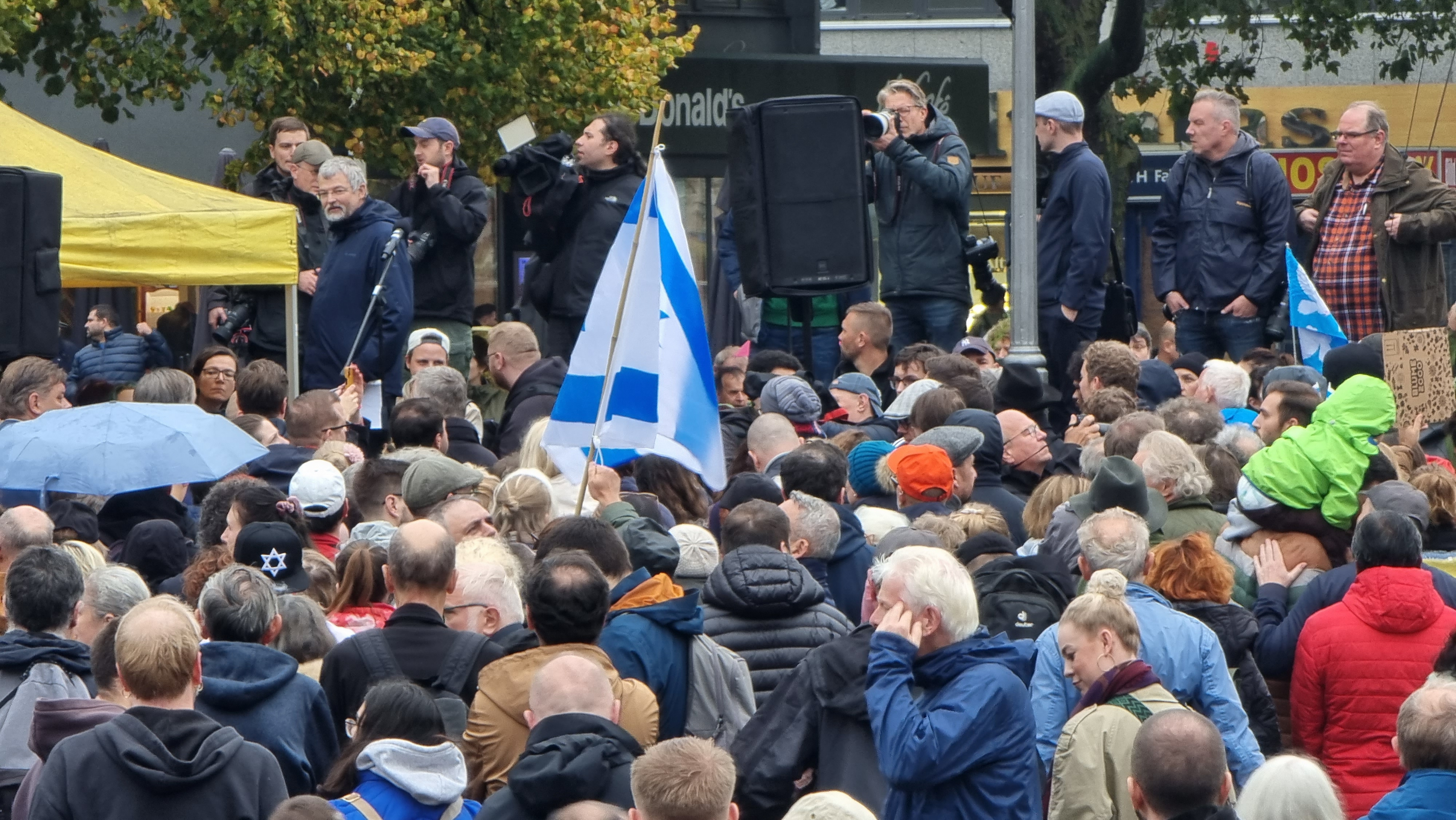
Pro-Israel protest in Hanover, 10 October

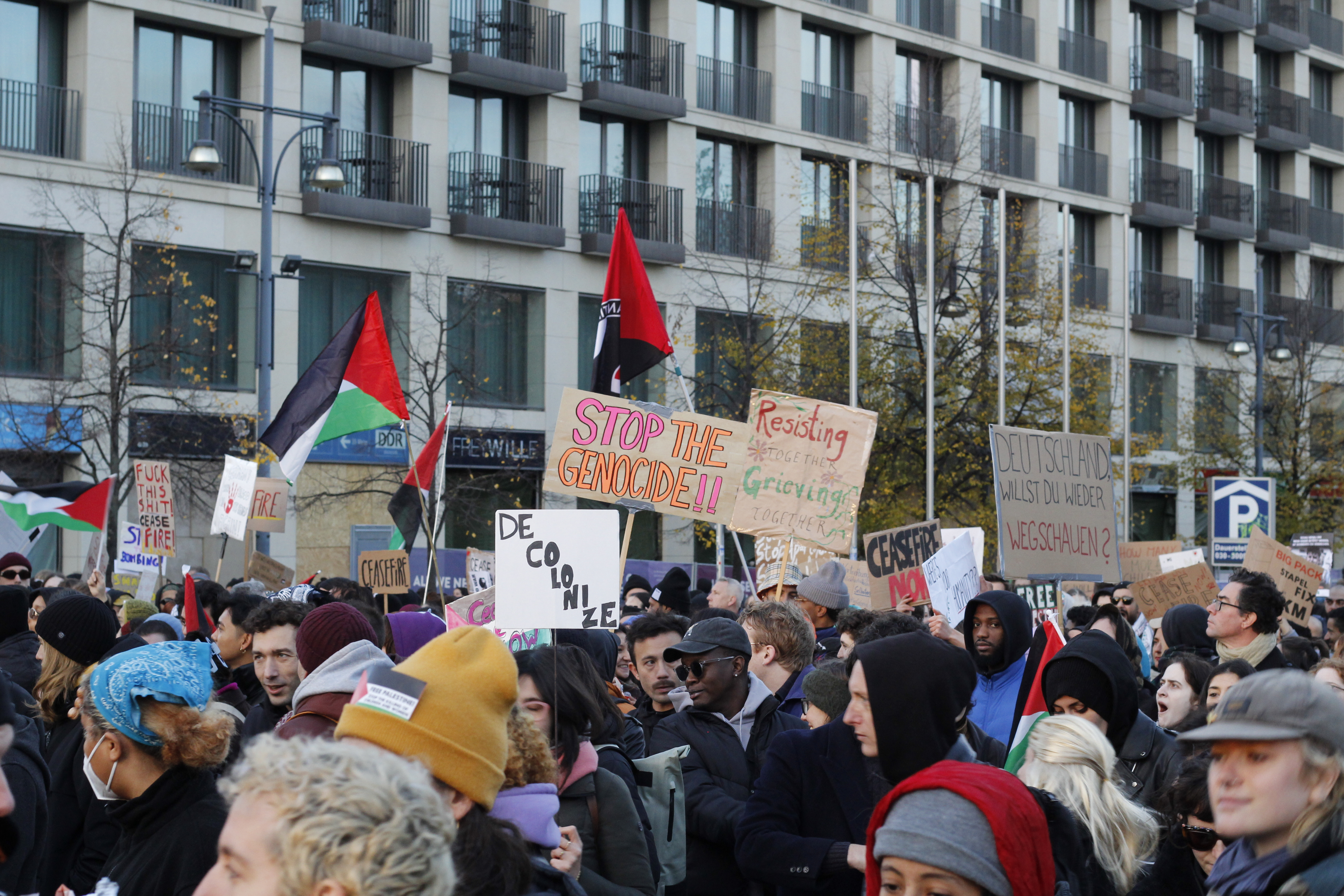
Pro-Palestine protest in Berlin, 4 November

Since October 2023, many pro-Palestine demonstrations were held in Germany. Most of them were peaceful. Some participants voiced support for Hamas or other Islamist organizations, called for the destruction of Israel, or used antisemitic slogans. In Berlin, authorities banned a pro-Palestinian rally from being held. A number of spontaneous demonstrations protesting the bombing of Gaza took place across the country. Germany banned fundraising for Hamas.

On 22 October, a pro-Israel rally was held in Berlin at the Brandenburg Gate. President Frank-Walter Steinmeier was present at the demonstration, as well as representatives from the German-Israeli Society, most mainstream political parties, the Council of the Protestant Church in Germany, the German Bishops' Conference, the Central Council of Jews in Germany, the Federation of German Industries, the German Trade Union Confederation and the Israeli ambassador Ron Prosor.

On 24 February 2024, protesters in Berlin carried a sign reading, "Stop the Genocide". In Neukölln, a neighborhood of Berlin, pro-Palestinian protesters described police crackdowns on protest that were "shocking and violent". In late April, a camp was set up in Berlin in front of the Bundestag in opposition to arms transfers to Israel.

On 15 July, clashes broke out between police and over 600 pro-Palestinian protestors, Seven demonstrators and 17 police officers were hurt and 28 demonstrators were charged. On 25 July, protests were held in Berlin, during which demonstrators recreated a scene from the Israeli bombardment of Gaza.

On 30 September, ahead of anniversary demonstrations, several activists were detained in Berlin.

On 6 October 2024, people rallied in Berlin in solidarity with Palestine and Lebanon during Israel's incursion.

On 15 May 2025, about 1,100 people took part in a pro-Palestine demonstration in Kreuzberg, Berlin to commemorate the 77th anniversary of the Nakba and to protest against Israel's military operation in Gaza. During the protests, several protesters and police officers were injured in violent confrontations.

On 10 September, during a pro-Palestine protest in Berlin's Mitte district, a member of the Irish Bloc Berlin was assaulted by German police. The incident was condemned by the Irish Taoiseach, Micheál Martin. On 27 September, more than 100,000 people joined a pro-Palestine rally in Berlin to protest against Germany's support for Israel.

=== Greece ===
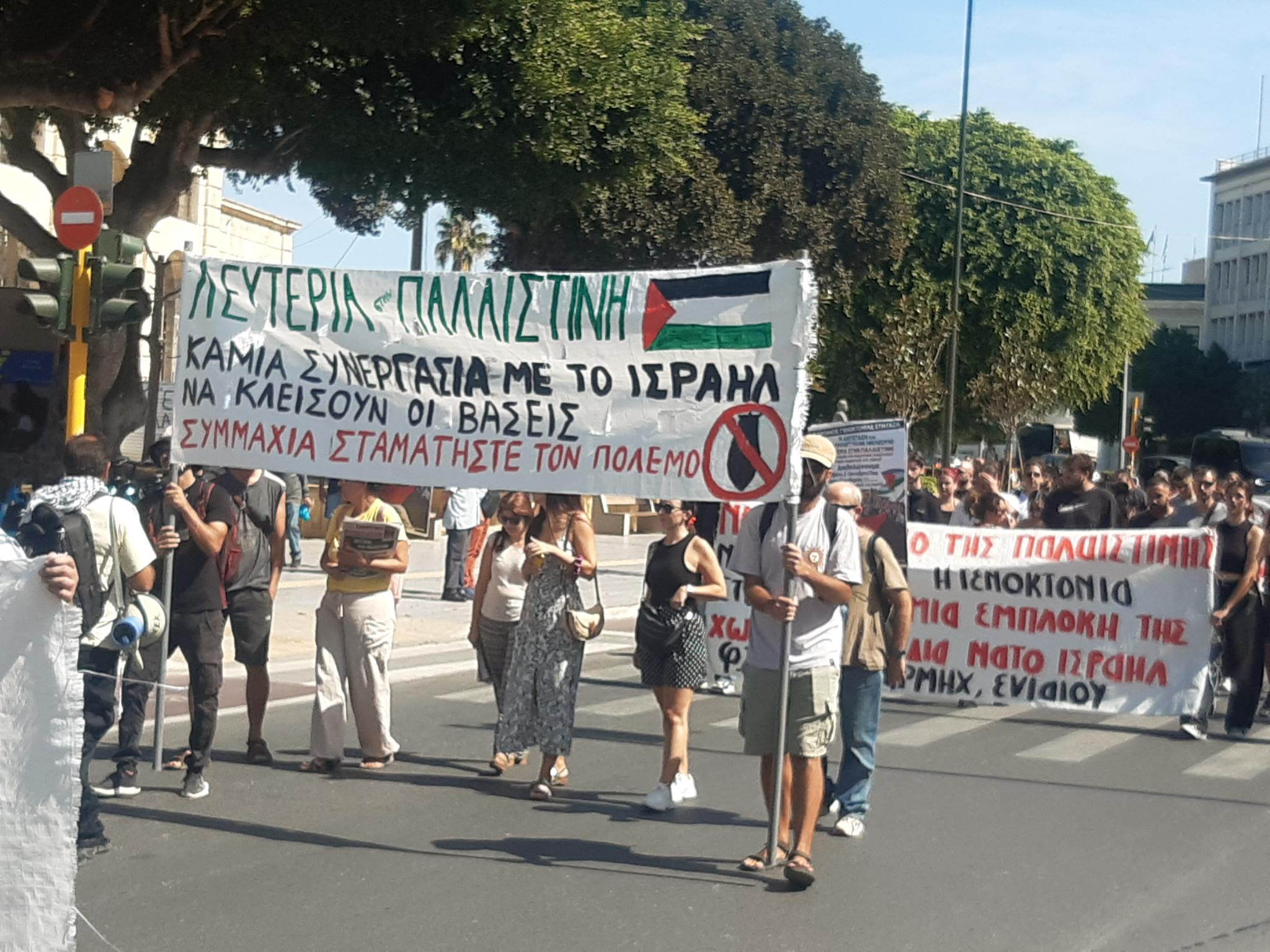
Pro-Palestinian protest in Chania, Greece on 5 October 2024

On 12 October 2023, 200 demonstrators gathered at Syntagma Square in Athens to show solidarity with Palestine. A day later, 2,000 protestors including Palestinians, members of Muslim communities, left-wing and anarchist groups marched toward the Israeli embassy. On 29 October, a crowd of 5,000 demonstrated in Athens, calling for an end to the Gaza massacre. On 25 March 2024, pro-Palestinian protesters blocked a tank during a military parade for Greece's Independence Day in Athens. On 15 May, a crowd of 2,500 people marched in Athens towards the Israeli embassy in solidarity of Palestine; the protesters later clashed with police.

On 22 July 2025, more than 300 people on the island of Syros protested against the docking of the MS Crown Iris which is owned by Israeli cruise company, Mano Maritime. The ship, which was carrying more than 1,600 passengers, was later rerouted to Cyprus due to "safety concerns". On 24 August, hundreds of people joined at a pro-Palestine march at White Tower Square in Thessaloniki to protest against Israel's attacks in Gaza.

=== Hungary ===
In August 2024, a pro-Palestine protest was held in front of the US embassy in Budapest in light of the International Day of the World's Indigenous Peoples. This was the first time that a pro-Palestine protest was allowed to be held in Hungary since October 2023. Hungary has also imposed restrictions on pro-Palestinian protests since 7 October.

=== Iceland ===
Pro-Palestinian protests were held at Austurvöllur in Reykjavík.

=== Ireland ===
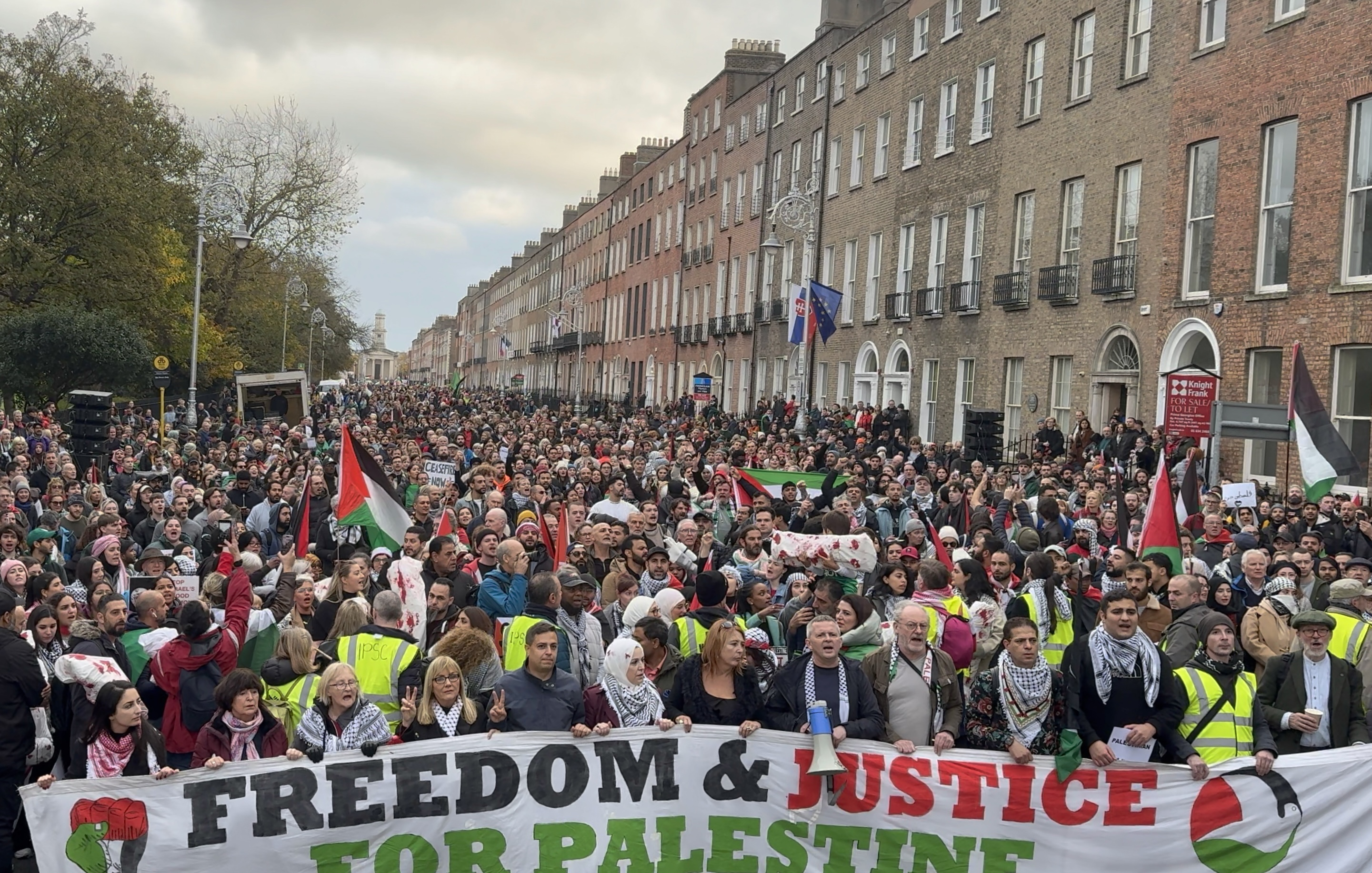
Pro-Palestine protest in Dublin, Ireland, 18 November 2023

Thousands of people marched in cities and towns across Ireland, including Carlow, Cork, Dublin, Ennis, Galway and Limerick in support of Palestine and against Israel's attacks on Gaza and the continuing occupation of Palestine. Residents of Ballina, the ancestral hometown of US president Joe Biden, splashed red paint and wrote "Genocide Joe" over a mural of the president's face.

=== Italy ===
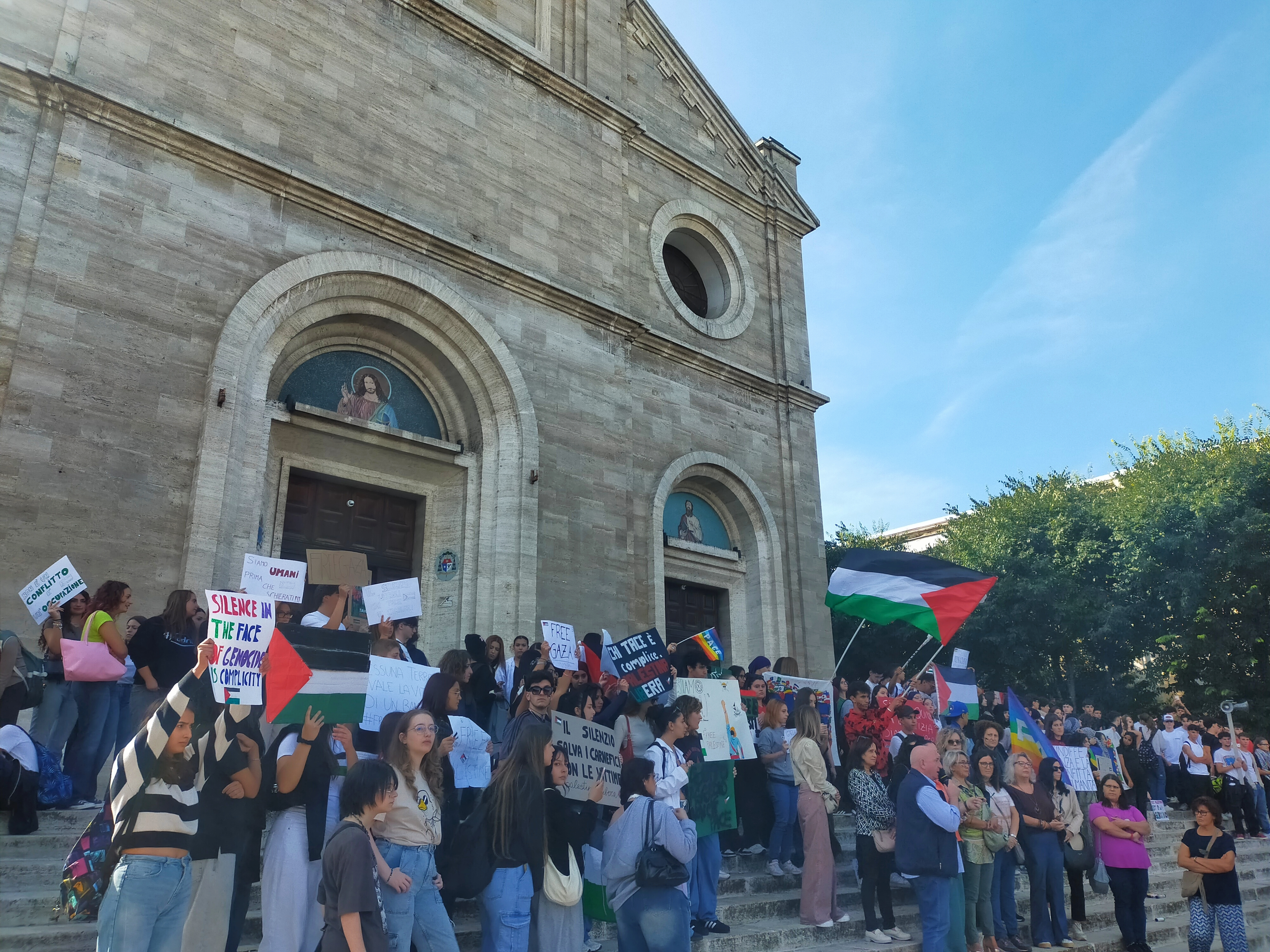
Pro-Palestinian protest in Avezzano, Italy, 22 September 2025

Thousands of pro-Palestinian demonstrators marched in Rome, carrying a large Palestinian flag and chanting slogans in support of Palestine. On 17 November, a long Palestinian flag was hung from the Leaning Tower of Pisa during a pro-Palestinian protest in the city. On 27 January 2024, in Milan, police clashed with pro-Palestinian protesters despite an official ban on protests on International Holocaust Remembrance Day. On 28 May 2024, a group of pro-Palestine protesters occupied a train station in Bologna. On 5 June 2024, a 15-meter Palestinian flag was unfurled on top of Milan Cathedral by former Italian MP Stefano Apuzzo. On 5 October 2024, a Pro-Palestine protest turned violent when thousands of protestors clashed with local police resulting in at least 34 people injured. Chants of "Free Palestine", "Criminal Israel" and "Now Intifada" rang out in Piazzale Ostiense during the event. On 7 June 2025, around 300,000 people marched through the streets of Rome to protest against Israel's war in Gaza. On 21 June 2025, over 100,000 people attended a protest in Rome against "war, rearmament, genocide, [and] authoritarianism." In August 2025, thousands of people joined a pro-Palestine protest at the 82nd Venice International Film Festival.

On 22 September 2025, a nationwide strike involving hundreds of thousands of people caused major disruptions across multiple cities.

On 8 May 2026, pavilions at the 61st Venice Biennale closed after artists went on strike in protest of Israel's participation in the event. The protest was organized by the Art Not Genocide Alliance.

=== Latvia ===
A pro-Palestine procession planned on 6 January 2024 by the "For a Free Palestine" movement (Latvian: Kustība "Par brīvu Palestīnu") was prohibited by the Riga City Council due to a perceived potential threat to public safety.

On 1 August 2025, a protest march organized by a private individual against Latvia's foreign policy in support of Israel against Palestine took place from Dailes Theatre to the square in front of the Riga Congress House. At the same time, a picket "condemning the genocide and violence of radical Islamists against Jews, Druze and other ethnic and religious minorities in the Middle East" organized by the association Jewnited.lv took place in front of the Ministry of Foreign Affairs.

During Israeli President Isaac Herzog's visit to Latvia on 5 August, a pro-Palestinian rally with approximately 30 participants was held near Riga Castle protesting against his visit and demanding Israel to stop military operations in the Gaza Strip. A simultaneous pro-Israel counter-protest was organized on the other side of the square.

=== Lithuania ===
On 29 November 2023, around 100 people gathered in Vilnius to protest Israel's actions in Gaza, marking the International Day of Solidarity with the Palestinian People. At the same time, a pro-Israel protest was held to counter the pro-Palestine protesters.

=== Luxembourg ===
On 13 January 2024, as a part of the "global day of action", protestors gathered in front of the US embassy in Luxembourg City to demand an end to the Israeli war in Gaza and a permanent ceasefire.

=== Malta ===
On 6 October 2024, a pro-Palestine protest was held in Valletta, marking the one-year anniversary of the war and demanding a ceasefire in Gaza and to 'end Zionist terror' against the Palestinians.

=== Moldova ===
On 19 October 2023, over 20 protesters gathered in Chișinău in front of the Parliament of Moldova, demanding the chamber to condemn the Gaza genocide and the recognition of an independent Palestinian state.

=== Netherlands ===
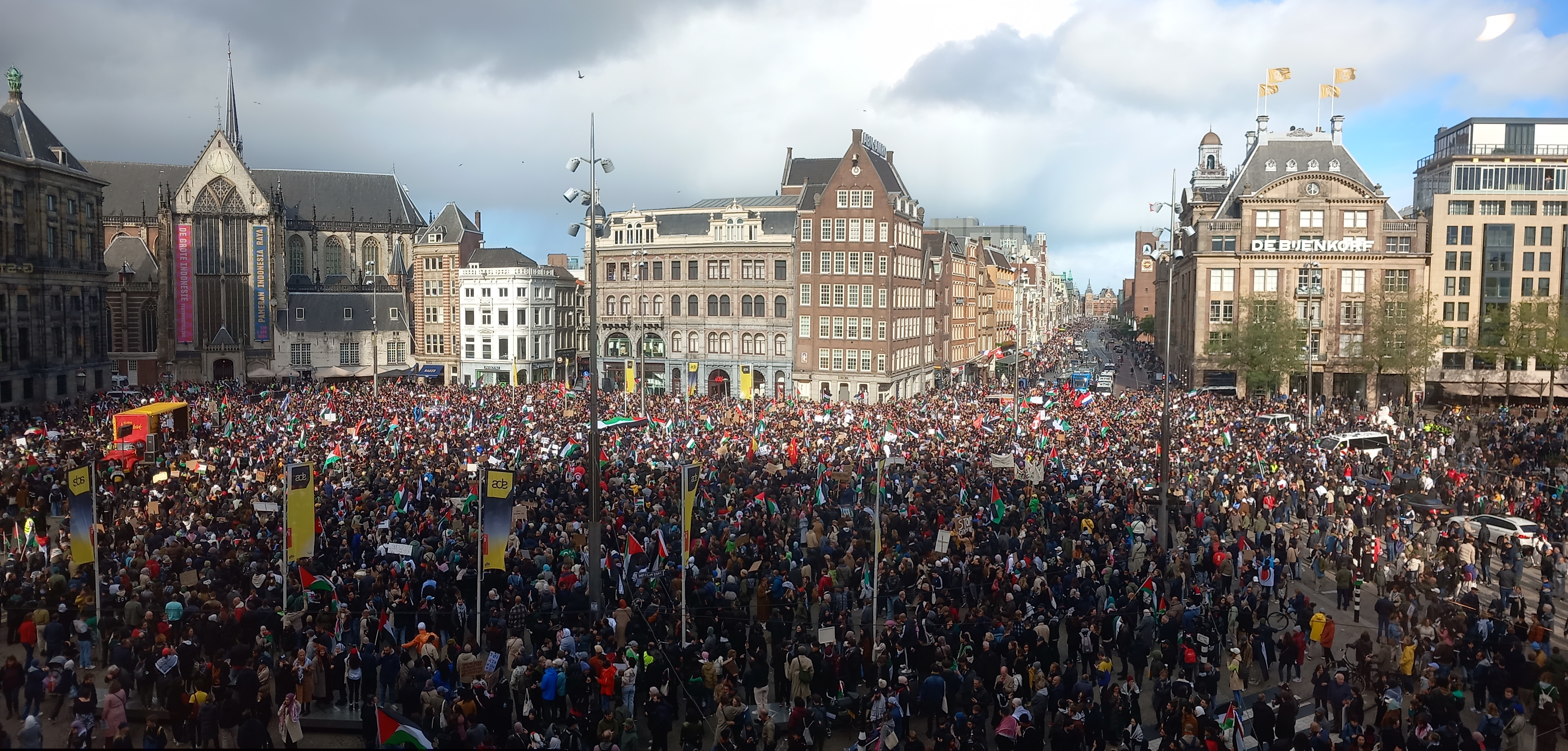
Anti-war demonstrations with Palestinian flags in Amsterdam, the Netherlands

A group of students rallied in The Hague on 13 October 2023 to show solidarity with Palestine, followed by a 15,000-strong pro-Palestinian protest in Amsterdam on 15 October. On 23 October, activists opposed to Israel's actions in Gaza occupied the entrance to the International Criminal Court in The Hague, demanding action against Benjamin Netanyahu for alleged war crimes. On 21 December, civil servants demanded a truce. In January 2024, a billboard campaign displayed messages regarding the war, such as "every ten minutes one Palestinian child dies". On 13 January, a protest organised by the Plant een Olijfboom (Plant an Olive Tree) Foundation was held in Amsterdam, honoring children killed in Gaza by placing around 10,000 pairs of children's shoes in Dam Square, each pair representing one Palestinian child killed by Israeli air strikes.

On 11 January 2024, hundreds of pro-Israel protesters carrying Dutch and Israeli flags gathered outside the International Court of Justice. Hundreds of Palestinian supporters also gathered to watch the genocide hearings on a large screen less than a hundred metres away from the pro-Israel group. A healthcare workers collective protested against Gaza's healthcare collapse with five demands: an end to Israel's bombing of hospitals, an end to the killing of healthcare workers, the end of arms sales to Israel, the release of abducted healthcare workers and immediate access to medical supplies. During Isaac Herzog's visit to the National Holocaust Museum in Amsterdam, protesters at a square nearby chanted "Never again is now" and "Ceasefire now" and held signs that said "Jews against genocide".

On 17 March 2024, people lined up thousands of shoes dedicated to the 13,000 children who died from the war in a public square in Utrecht.

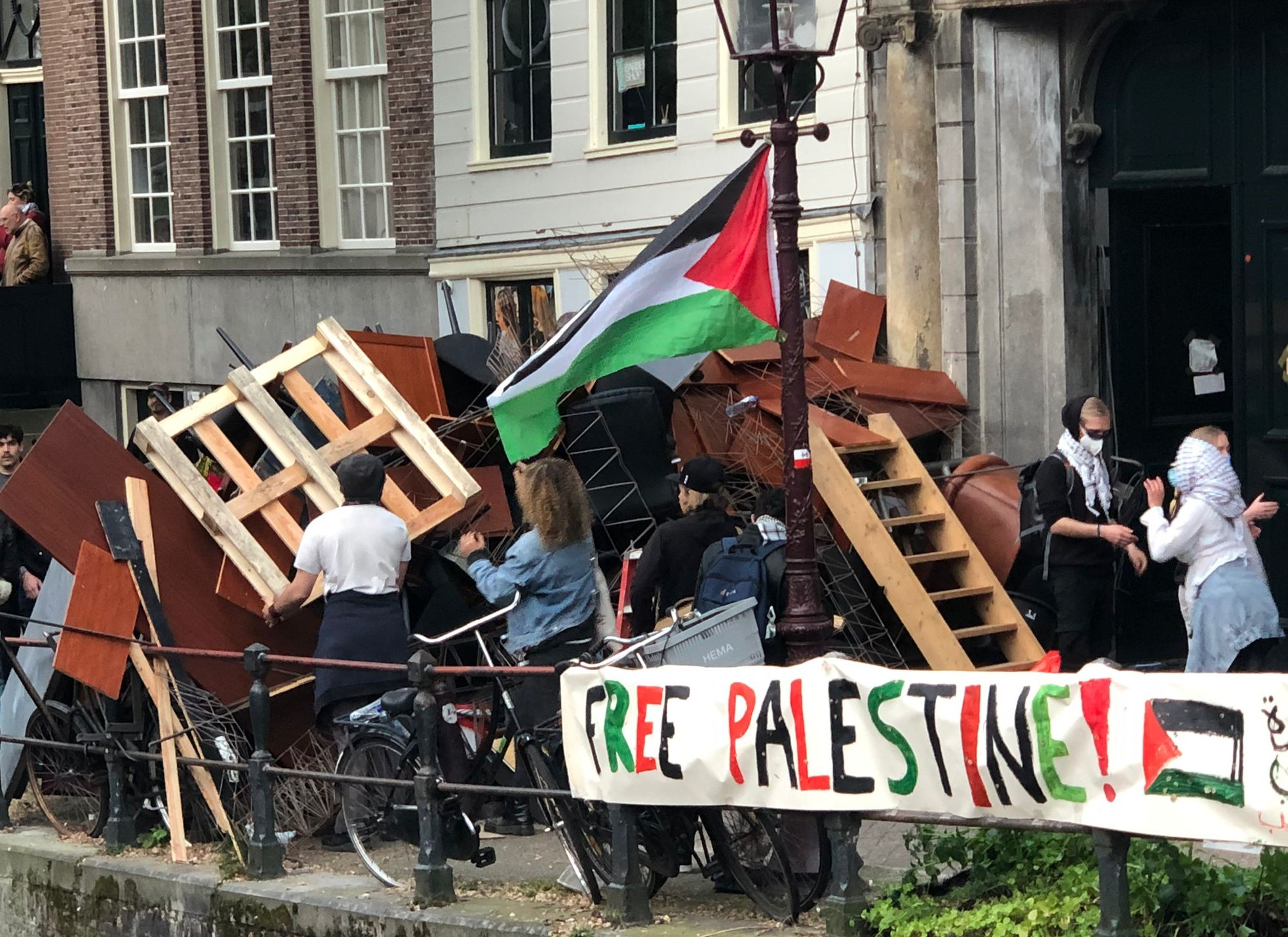
Protesters reinforcing a barricade at the University of Amsterdam campus occupation, 8 May 2024

On 8 May 2024, as part of a series of pro-Palestinian protests on university campuses, police broke up a student protest at the University of Amsterdam, where protesters had blockaded the university grounds. Protesters were demanding an end to the conflict, with some calling on the university to sever academic ties to Israel. Confrontations were described as violent, but it was unclear whether anyone had been injured or detained. Reuters reported that police struck protesters on the head with batons.

On 20 April 2025, more than 10,000 people showed up in a pro-Palestinian demonstration in Rotterdam to protest against Israel's actions on Gaza. On 18 May, more than 100,000 people marched through The Hague at the red line protest while wearing red clothing as an expression to "draw a red line" against Israel's blockade on Gaza and demanded the Dutch government to take more action against Israel. On 15 June, the same initiative was repeated and reached 150,000 protesters. On 29 June, around 18,000 shoes and toys were displayed in Almere, representing more than 17,400 children that were killed in Gaza.

Hundreds of people protested during the 2025 NATO summit in The Hague against Israel's war in the Gaza Strip and the Twelve-Day War following US strikes on Iranian nuclear sites.

On 5 October 2025, the third red line demonstration was held. With 250,000 participants, this was the largest demonstration in the country in over 20 years. Five activists were arrested.

On November 8, 2026, tens of thousands participated in the "Red Line" demonstration in Amsterdam, demanding stronger action from the Dutch government against Israel, including imposing stricter trade sanctions, officially declaring Israel's actions in Gaza to be genocide, and completely halting arms sales to Israel.

==== Football riots ====
On 2 November 2024, a pro-Palestinian protester was attacked by AFC Ajax supporters near Amsterdam Centraal station. He was one of several pro-Palestinian protesters who had called for a boycott of Maccabi Tel Aviv F.C. and other Israeli teams to match the boycott of Russian teams.

On 7 November 2024, violence erupted between supporters of Maccabi Tel Aviv, who were in Amsterdam to compete in a UEFA Europa League game, and locals after the Israeli football team was filmed making anti-Palestinian and anti-Arab chants, tearing down Palestinian flags from homes and attacking Moroccan taxi drivers. Benjamin Netanyahu and Israeli commentators said the attacks on Israeli fans were antisemitic and compared them to a pogrom. Dutch Prime Minister Dick Schoof and Amsterdam Mayor Femke Halsema concurred and issued a three-day ban on protests in the city. The actions of the Maccabi Tel Aviv fans were meanwhile described as "hooliganism" and racist by the local authorities and the Palestinian Authority, respectively.

On 13 November 2024, video emerged showing police beating pro-Palestinian protesters defying the ongoing city-wide ban. Halsema said the video "looks serious".

=== North Macedonia ===
On 20 October, citizens of varying ethnicities, such as Albanian, Macedonian, Turkish, Bosnian and Romani, held a protest in the old part of the capital Skopje to show support and solidarity for the Palestinian people under the slogan "Don't be silent about the massacre".

On 9 August 2025, protesters gathered in front of Parliament in Skopje in solidarity with Palestinians.

=== Norway ===
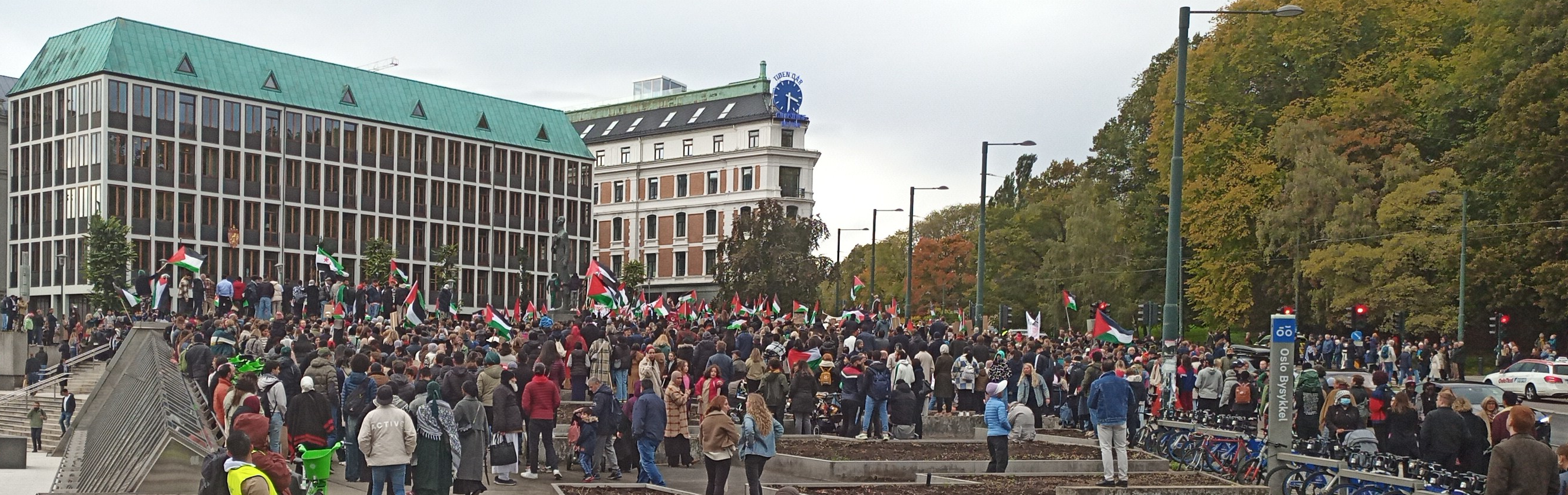
Rally in support of the people of Gaza, Oslo, Norway, 14 October

On 14 October, thousands of pro-Palestine demonstrators protested outside the Ministry of Foreign Affairs in Oslo. On 17 October, about 100 pro-Palestine demonstrators protested outside the Israeli embassy in Oslo shouting "Allahu akbar".

On 15 October, about 500 people attended a pro-Israel demonstration in Oslo arranged by With Israel for Peace. Among the speakers were politicians such as Progress Party leader Sylvi Listhaug.

On 4 November, 9,000 people attended a pro-Gaza demonstration appealed by Socialist Left Party leader Kirsti Bergstø and Red Party leader Marie Sneve Martinussen.

On 11 November, up to 5,000 people attended a demonstration walking from the Storting. The protest was organized in opposition to Norway's role in the conflict.

On 12 August 2024, a protest occurred outside Norges Bank in Oslo. An elderly man was filmed punching a woman protester during the event.

=== Poland ===
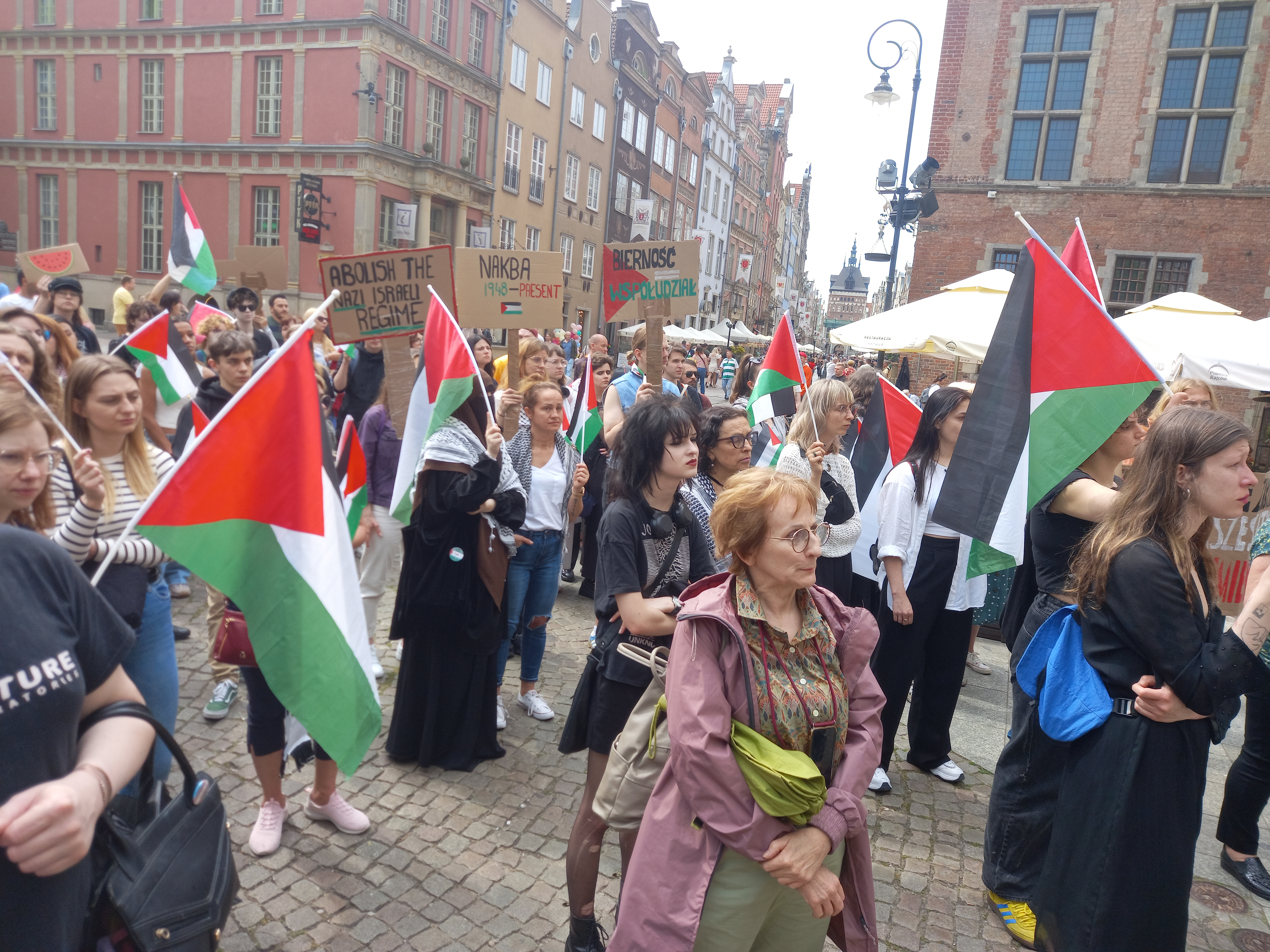
Pro-Palestine protest in Gdańsk, Poland, 19 May 2024

Hundreds of demonstrators gathered in Warsaw on 30 October to express their support for the Palestinian population and condemn the Israeli assaults on Gaza. In November 2023, Warsaw mayor Rafał Trzaskowski banned a pro-Palestinian protest in Warsaw, citing security concerns and antisemitism. On 23 January 2024, one person protested against the alleged Israeli genocide of Palestinians at the Israeli embassy in Warsaw.

=== Portugal ===
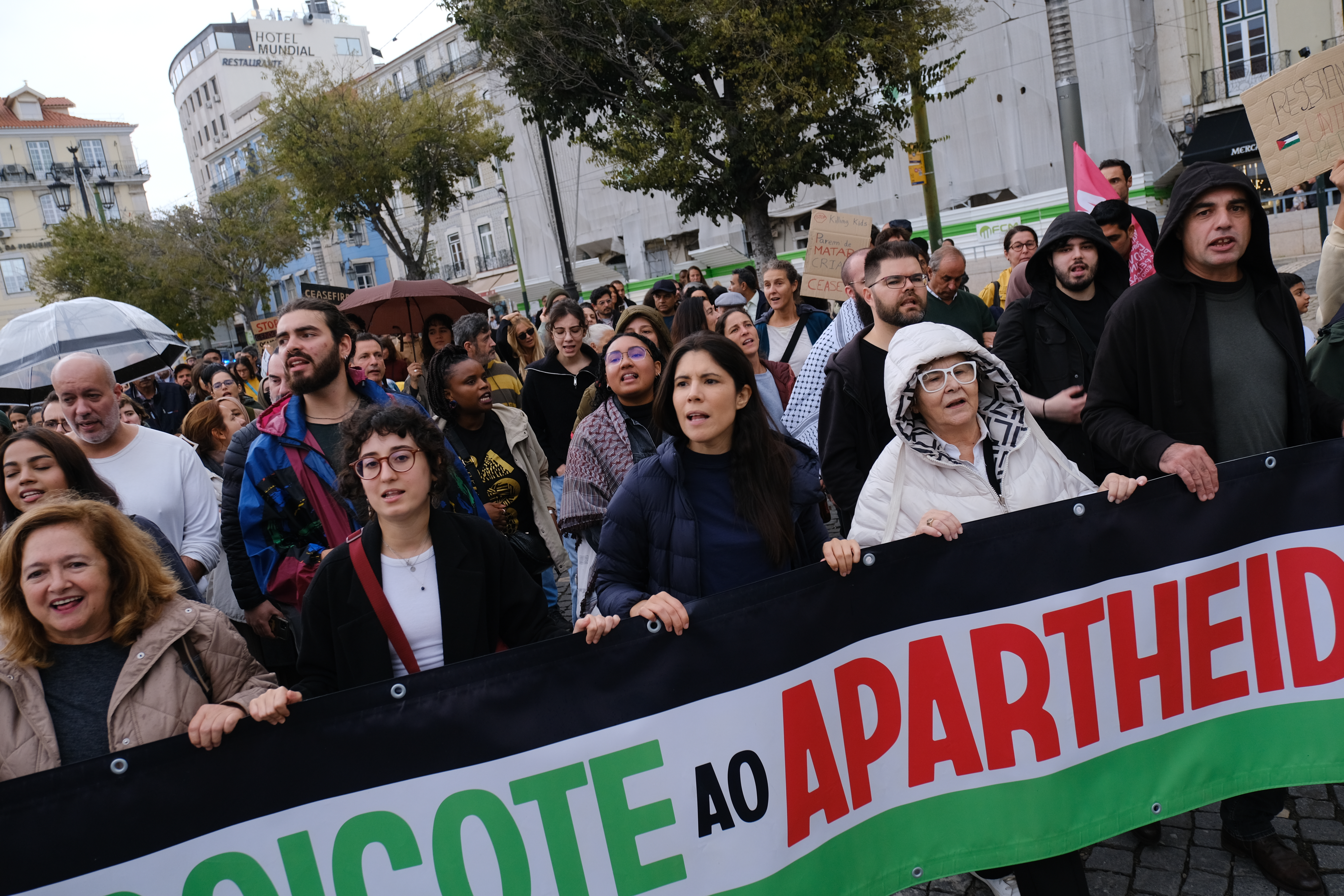
Pro-Palestine protest in Lisbon, Portugal, 29 October 2023

A pro-Palestine protest was held in Lisbon. A number of people assembled in Lisbon over the weekend to denounce what they referred to as "the genocide in the Gaza Strip" and to call for an urgent cessation of hostilities. The protest kicked off at the US embassy in Lisbon, located in the Sete Rios district, before proceeding to the Israeli embassy in Avenidas Novas. The Portuguese Council for Peace and Cooperation (CPPC), the General Confederation of Portuguese Workers – National Trade Union (CGTP-IN), the Movement for the Rights of the Palestinian People and for Peace in the Middle East (MPPM), and the Noise Project – Youth Association jointly organized a protest advocating for "peace in the Middle East."

=== Romania ===
On 12 October 2023, a pro-Israel rally was organised in Bucharest by the Romanian Jewish community and the Israeli Embassy. It was attended by more than 600 people, including Health Minister Alexandru Rafila, former Defence Minister Vasile Dîncu and opposition leader George Simion.

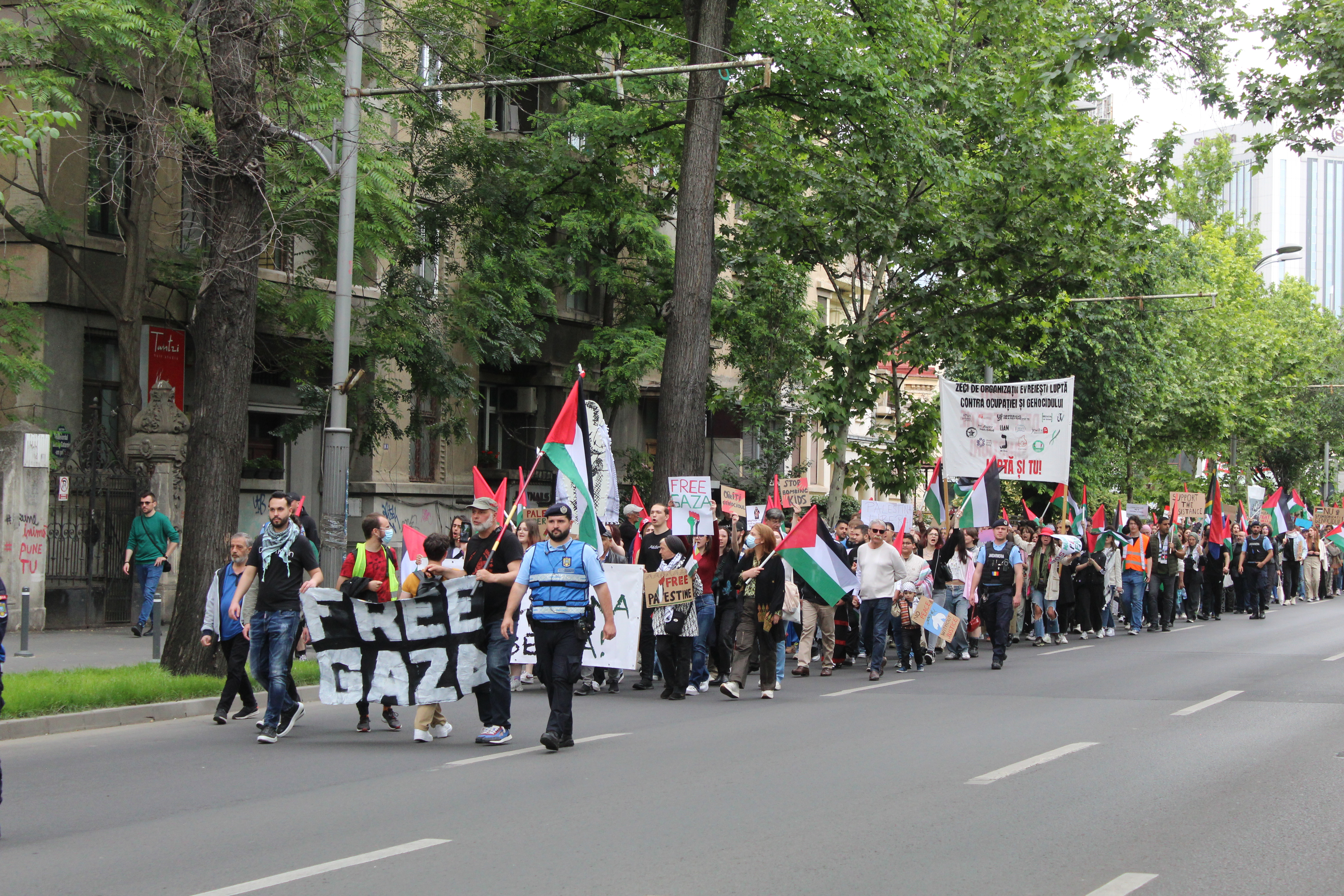
A pro-Palestinian rally in the centre of Bucharest, Romania being escorted by the police, with banners calling for an end to the genocide (May 2024)

On 21 October 2023, a pro-Palestine rally was held in Bucharest and attended by over 1,000 demonstrators, including Twitch streamer and left-wing activist Silviu Istrate.

A pro-Palestinian rally held in Bucharest on 19 May 2024 was attended by Romanian Greens/EFA MEP Nicu Ștefănuță.

On 20 June 2024, the administration of the University of Bucharest called the Gendarmerie to evacuate pro-Palestine protesters occupying its campus. MEP Nicu Ștefănuță compared this event with the invitation of miners by President Ion Iliescu in 1990, which resulted in the infamous June 1990 Mineriad.

During the 2024 edition of the Bucharest Pride, some pro-Palestinians shouted "there is no pride in genocide".

On Good Friday, 18 April 2025, the Romania-Palestine Solidarity Association organized a candlelight vigil at the Memorial of Rebirth in the centre of Bucharest to commemorate the victims of the genocide in Gaza.

=== Russia ===
In late October 2023, an anti-Israel mob stormed Uytash Airport in Makhachkala, Dagestan to prevent the landing of a flight from Tel Aviv, which the mob alleged contained Jewish refugees from Israel arriving in Dagestan. These rumors were disseminated by a Telegram channel associated with Russian-Ukrainian politician Ilya Ponomarev. 20 people were injured, among them nine police officers, of whom two were injured seriously. The passengers on the plane were unharmed. 150 suspects were identified, while 60 were detained.

The head of Dagestan, Sergey Melikov, called the incident a gross violation of the law. Russian president Vladimir Putin ordered a meeting of his top security officials, while his spokesperson Dmitry Peskov blamed the unrest on "outside interference". Putin added that any normal person would be outraged by images of "bloodied children" in Gaza, but Russians needed "to keep a clear head". The Israeli government called on Russian authorities to protect Israelis and Jews in Russia.

=== Serbia ===
On 13 October, pro-Palestinian protests were organised in Novi Pazar and Novi Sad. Over 15,000 protesters gathered in Novi Sad expressing solidarity with Palestine and denouncing Israel, with slogans such as "Freedom for Palestine," "From the river to the sea, Palestine will be free," and "Stop the genocide."

=== Slovenia ===
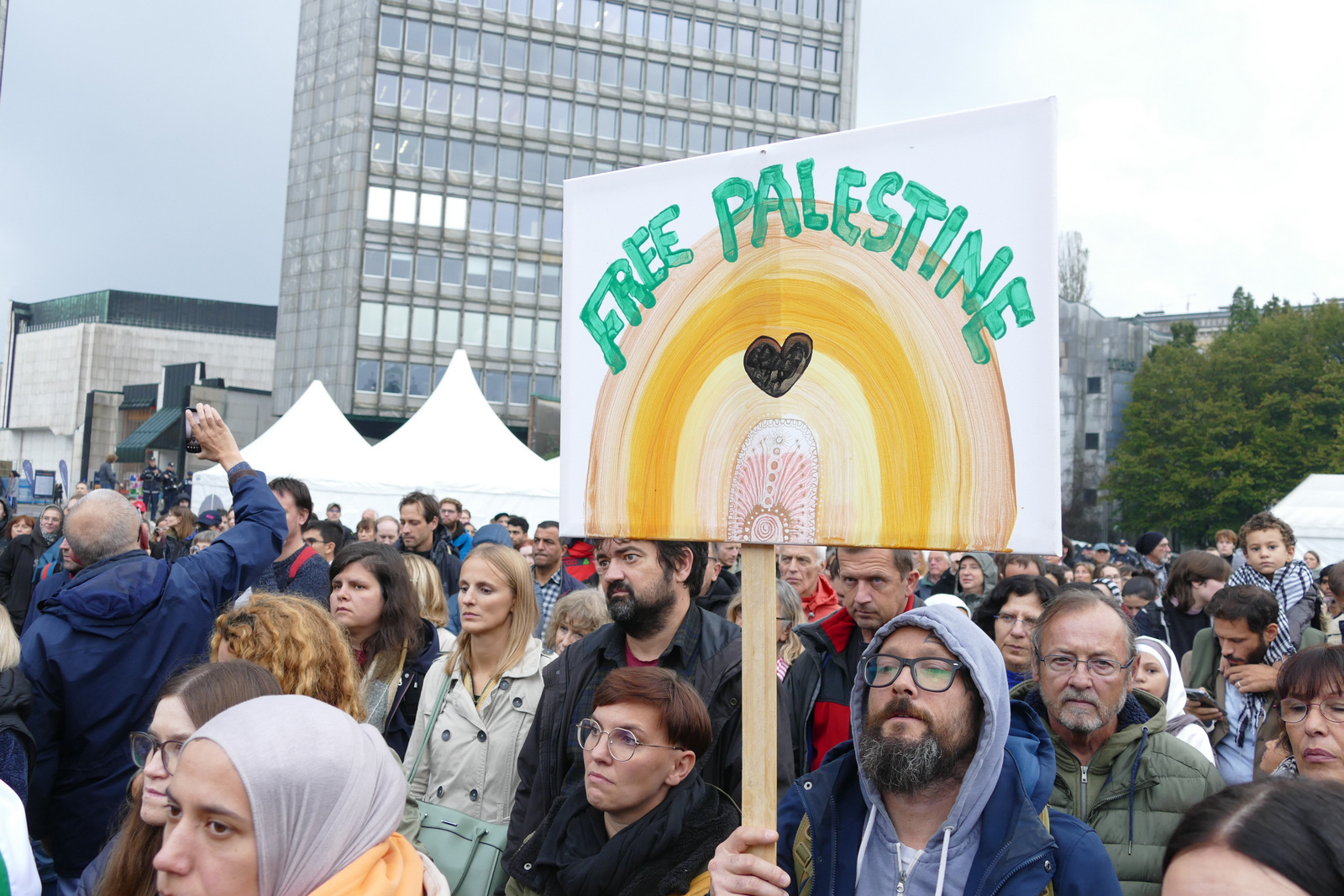
Pro-Palestine protest in Ljubljana, Slovenia, 13 October 2023

On 13 October, pro-Palestinian protests were organised in Ljubljana. On 9 November, a large crowd gathered in Ljubljana to show their support for Palestinians, while the parliamentary Foreign Policy Committee approved a statement urging for an immediate halt to hostilities, a ceasefire, and the establishment of humanitarian corridors in Gaza.

=== Spain ===
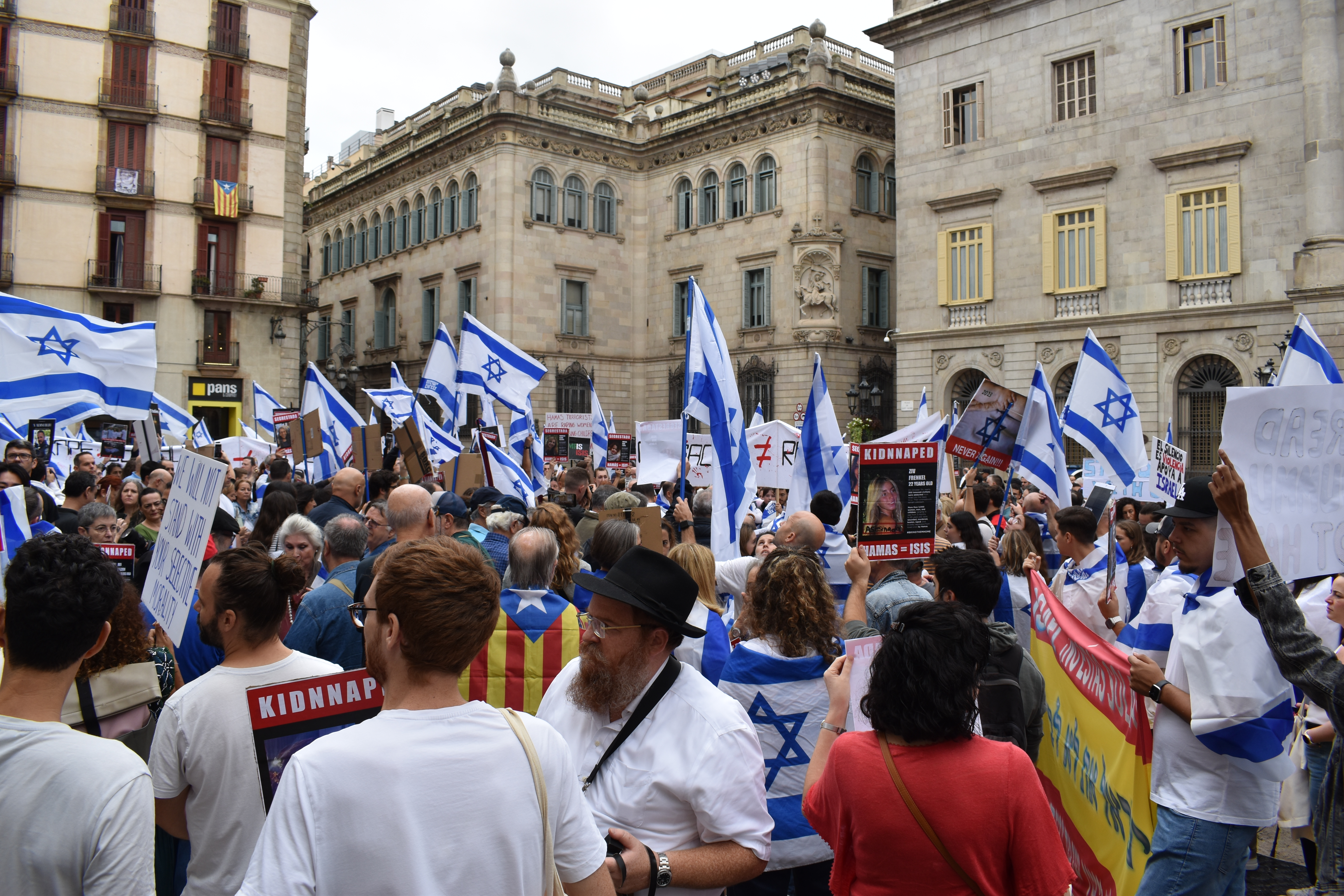
Pro-Israel protest in Barcelona, 15 October 2023

On 9 October, pro-Palestinian demonstrators gathered in the Puerta del Sol in Madrid. On 13 October, protestors rallied at the Columbus Monument in Barcelona. On 8 December, over 3000 pro-Palestine protesters in Guernica formed a massive mosaic with a human chain depicting the Palestinian flag to express their solidarity. On 27 January 2024, an estimated 20,000 marched in support of Palestine in Madrid. At least six cabinet ministers joined a march for a ceasefire in Madrid. On 11 May, about 4,000 people participated in pro-Palestine protests in Madrid. On 19 May, mass demonstrations erupted in Valencia calling for the end of the war. The demonstration also saw the participation of six ministers from Prime Minister Pedro Sanchez's cabinet.

In January 2025, several people held demonstrations against the arrival of the Maccabi Tel Aviv basketball team in Madrid. On 22 February, around 1,000 people demonstrated in front of the American Embassy in Madrid to protest against the Gaza genocide and US's plan to take over Gaza. On 14 June, about 25,000 people marched through the streets of Barcelona calling for an end of the 'genocide' in Palestine.

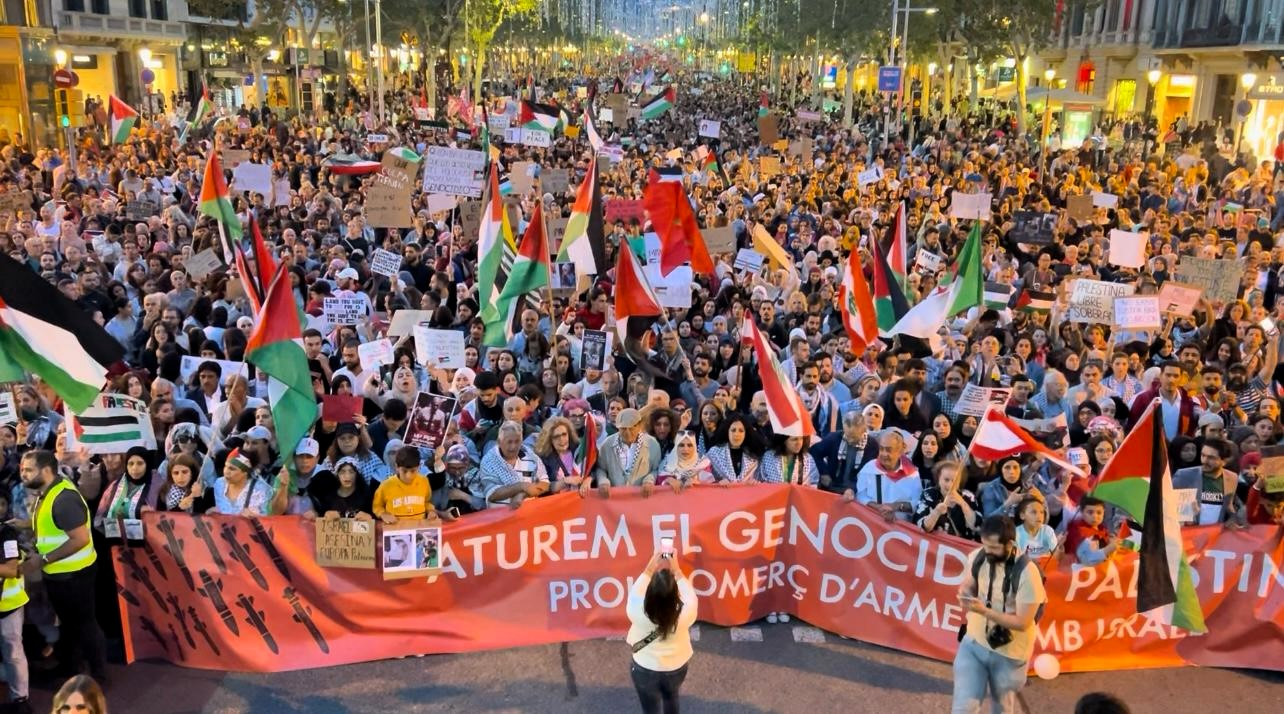
Pro-Palestinian protest in Barcelona, 21 October 2023

During the 11th stage of the 2025 Vuelta a España on 3 September, a group of pro-Palestine protesters tried to enter the racetrack as the Israel–Premier Tech team passed by in Bilbao, forcing the organizers to finish the segment prematurely without declaring a winner. The incident also forced Israel–Premier Tech to issue new uniforms to its cyclists that did not carry its name. During the 15th stage on 7 September, another pro-Palestine protester tried to enter a road while carrying a Palestinian flag, causing cyclists Javier Romo and Edward Planckaert to crash. Romo subsequently withdrew from the race altogether. On 9 September, the 16th stage was shortened by 8 km (5.0 mi) after pro-Palestine protesters gathered in large numbers near the original finish line. On 14 September, thousands of demonstrators tore down barricades at the final finishing circuit of the race and forced the organized to cancel the competition completely. More than 2,200 police officers were drafted as security. Two protesters were arrested and 22 officers were injured. The Vuelta a España is the final stage of the Grand Tour.

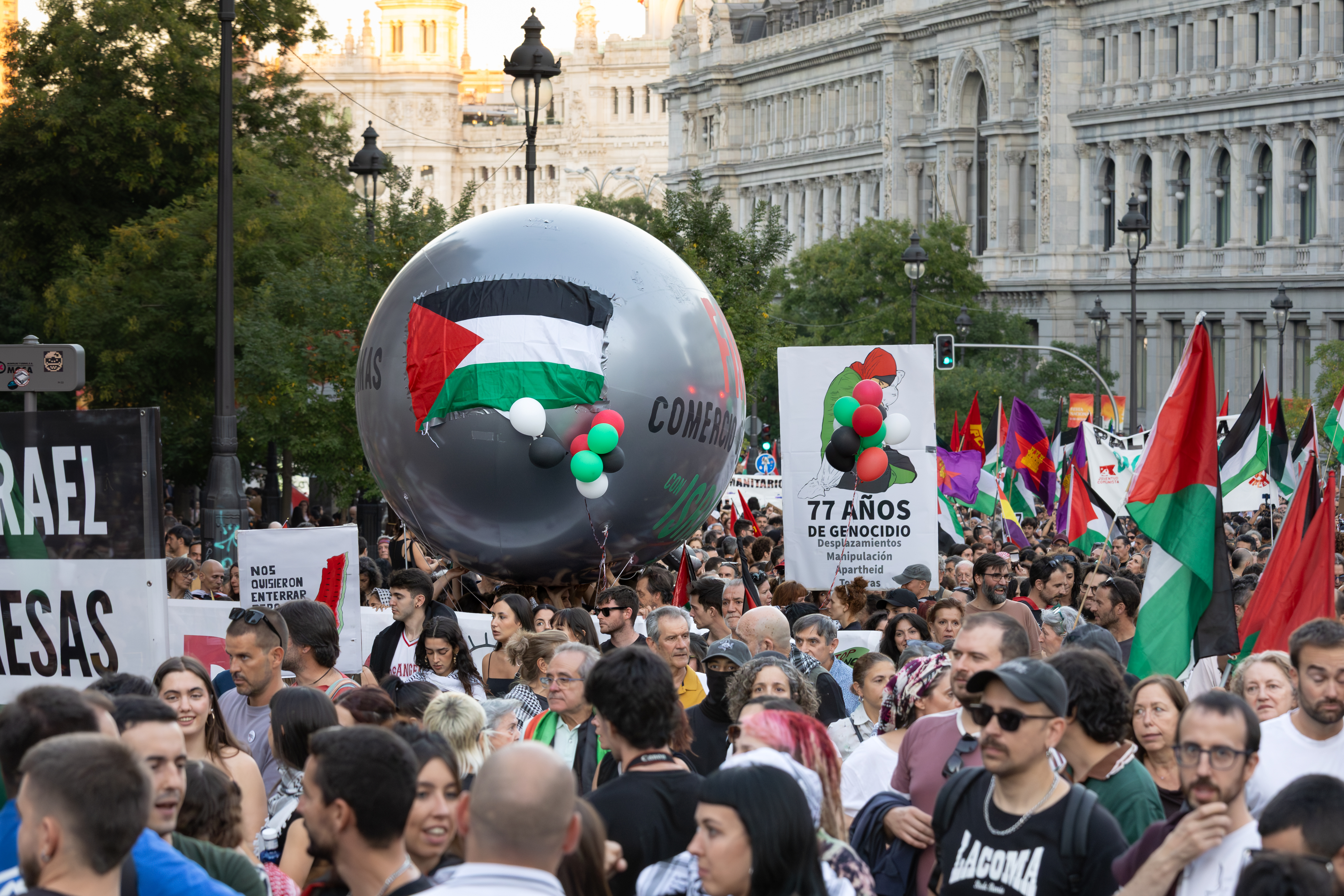
Pro-Palestinian protest in Madrid, 4 October 2025

Over the weekend of 3-5 October 2025, a wave of pro-Palestine demonstrations swept across Spain, with protests held in dozens of cities over the interception of the Global Sumud Flotilla and calls for a halt to Israel’s assault on Gaza. On 4 October, thousands of people took to the streets of Madrid from Atocha to Callao to demand “stop the genocide” and an end to state complicity with the State of Israel. At that time, members of the flotilla were still detained in Israel. According to the Government Delegation, approximately 92,000 people participated, waving Palestinian flags, shouting “Free Palestine” and “Stop the genocide,” and calling for the suspension of arms trade and diplomatic ties with Israel.

=== Sweden ===
Numerous demonstrations have been held in Sweden since the war began, both pro-Palestinian and pro-Israeli.

On 7 October 2023 – following the attack against Israel – there were pro-Palestinian celebrations in some Swedish cities. In Malmö, people drove around in cars waving Palestinian flags and shot fireworks. Similar events occurred in Helsingborg, Kristianstad and Växjö. Celebrations of the attack were widely condemned by politicians, including by Prime Minister Ulf Kristersson and Opposition Leader Magdalena Andersson.

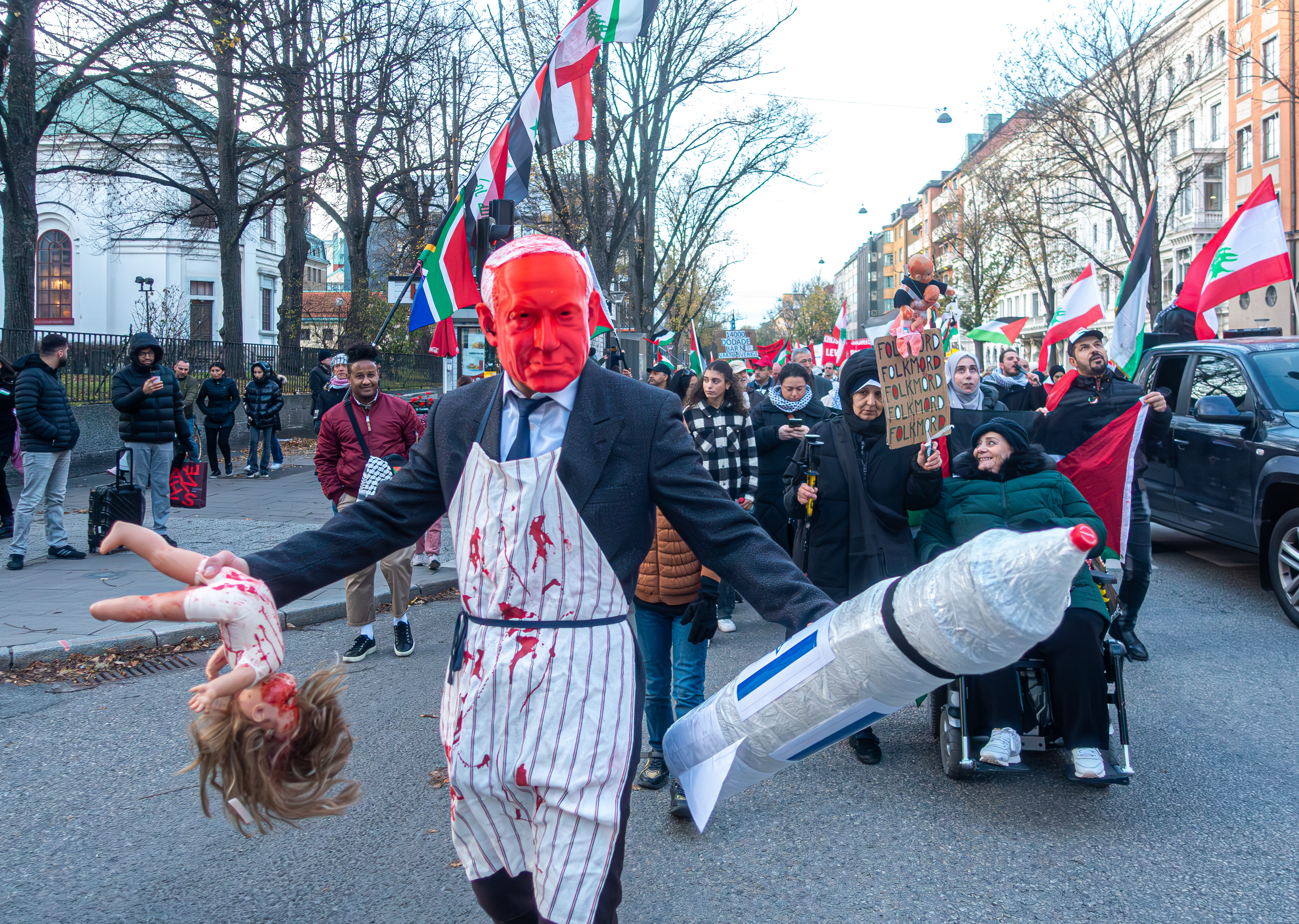
Pro-Palestinian protest in Stockholm, Sweden, 2 November 2024

On 7 January 2024, protesters demonstrated against the war outside the US Embassy in Stockholm. On 28 January, pro-Palestinian protests were held in Helsingborg, Malmö, and Gothenburg. On 29 February, Swedish MEP Abir Al-Sahlani used her allotted speaking time during the parliamentary session to stage a silent protest. On 27 April 2024, a protest took place in Sweden with chants of "Free Palestine" and "Boycott Israel".

As the host of Eurovision 2024, Malmö saw demonstrations because of Israel's participation in the contest. On 9 May, roughly a hundred demonstrators gathered in Malmö for a pro-Israel rally while thousands had demonstrated against Israel's participation. On 11 May, thousands protested Eurovision in Malmö. Swedish climate activist Greta Thunberg was arrested protesting outside. Israeli singer Eden Golan was booed by the audience at a rehearsal. A presenter from Norway withdrew after making public allegations of genocide against Israel. Several other performers missed rehearsals, complained about double standards committed by the European Broadcasting Union and wore costumes and makeup with political messages that were explicitly forbidden by the rules of the contest.

On 7 June, police in Stockholm detained 19 pro-Palestinian activists who had barricaded themselves inside a building of the Royal Institute of Technology while calling for the institution to end collaboration with Israeli universities. In September 2024, Greta Thunberg was arrested while protesting for Stockholm University to cut its ties with Israel.

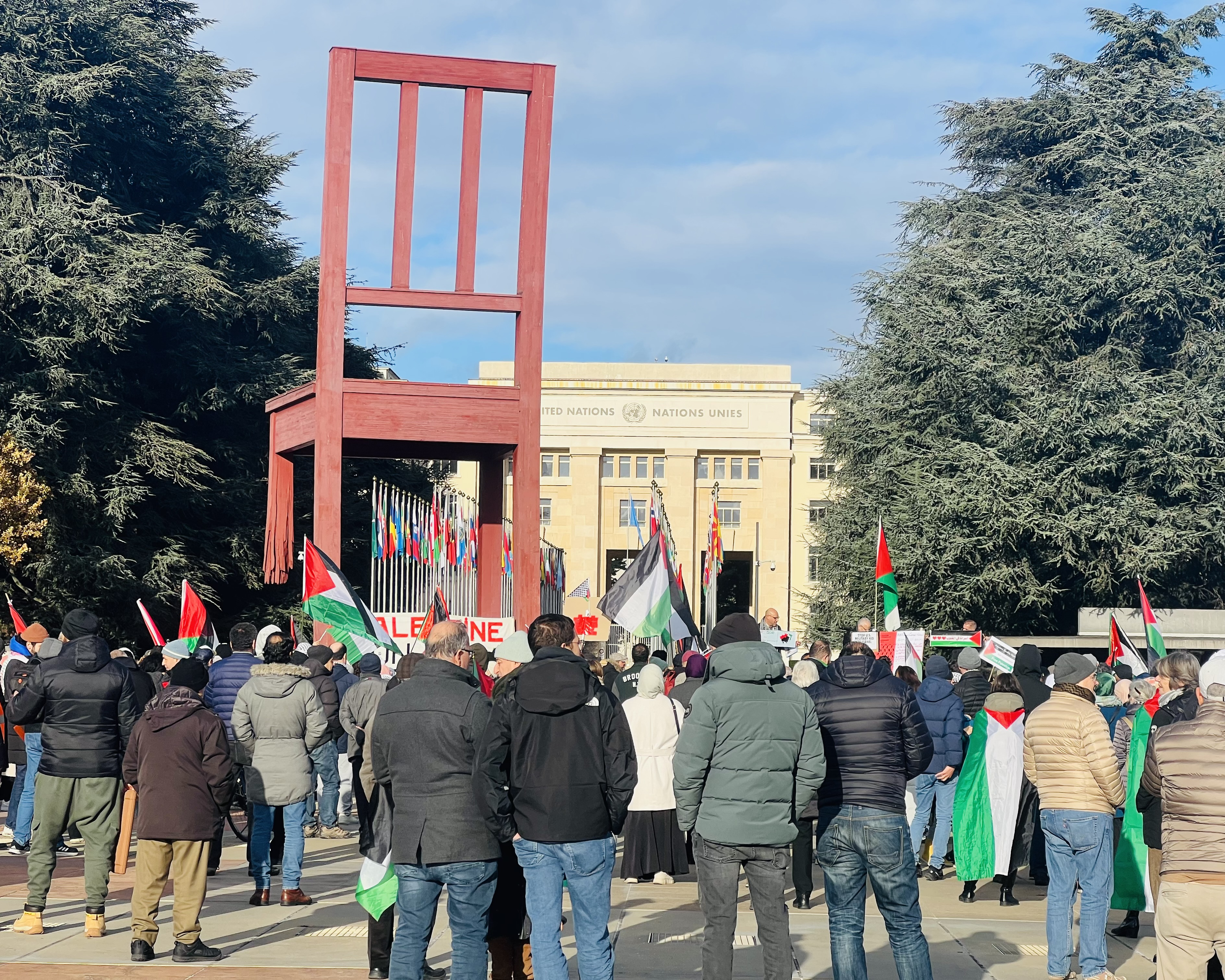
Pro-Palestine protest in Geneva in front of the UN Office, 25 November 2023

=== Switzerland ===
On 25 November 2023, pro-Palestinian demonstrators gathered in front of the United Nations Office in Geneva.

On 13 January 2024, over 15,000 protesters supporting the Palestinian cause gathered in Basel to stage a demonstration in solidarity with the people of Gaza. This gathering followed a prohibition imposed by several German-speaking Swiss cantons on similar activities.

On 2 May, hundreds of pro-Palestine students at the University of Lausanne staged a sit-in at a university facility, chanting "Gaza, UNIL is with you" and "down with Israeli apartheid".

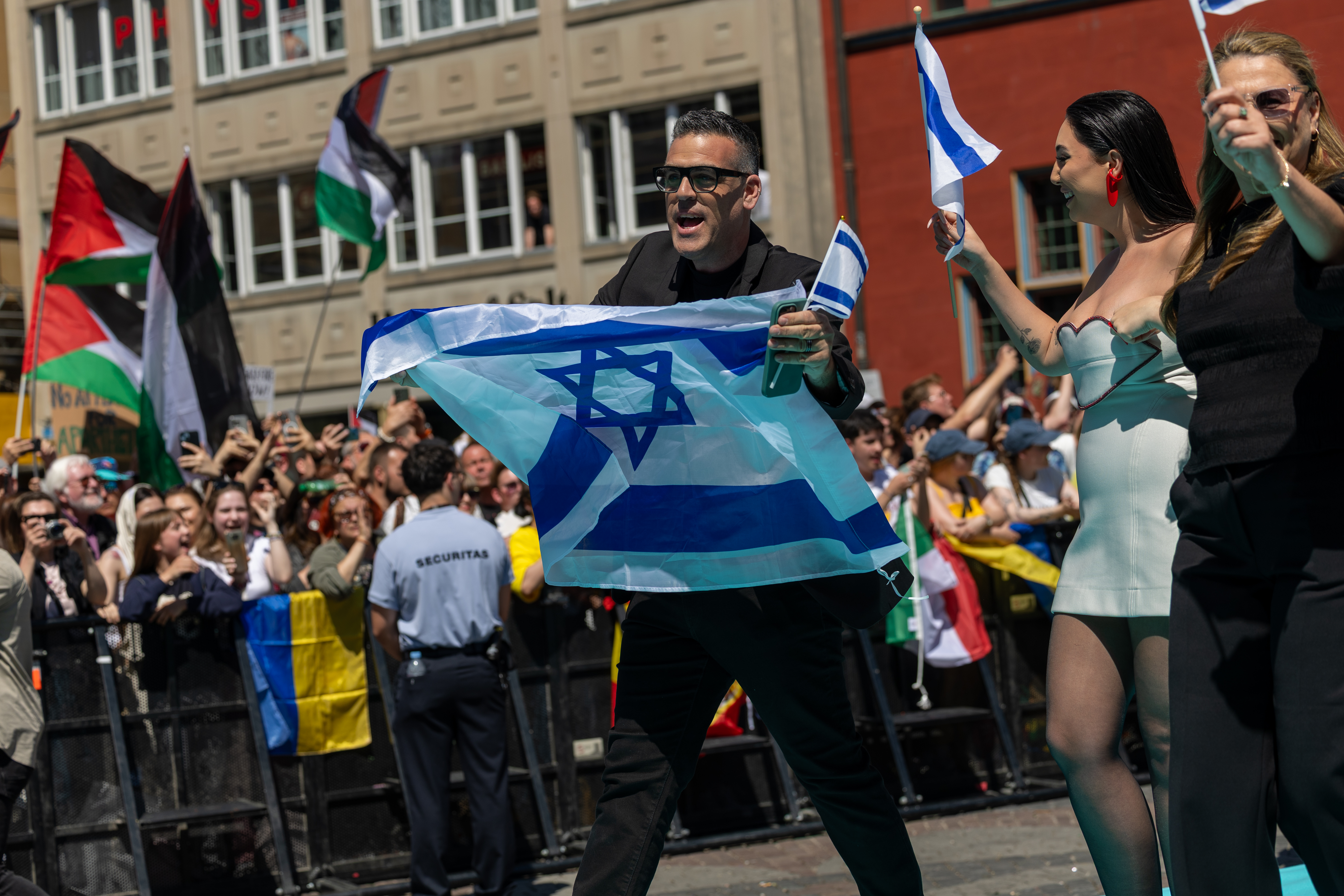
Pro-Palestinian protest during the opening ceremony of the Eurovision Song Contest in Basel, 11 May 2025

On 12 May, pro-Palestinian students demonstrated at the University of Bern, occupying a university building.

Israel's participation in the Eurovision Song Contest 2025 in Switzerland has sparked controversy. The "Turquoise Carpet" event, held on 11 May 2025 in the host city Basel, was targeted by pro-Palestinian protesters against Israel's participation.

=== Ukraine ===
Many Ukrainians have supported Israel, viewing the October 7 attacks as similar to the Russian invasion of Ukraine. Ukraine's ambassador to Israel Mykhailo Brodskyy described Ukraine as the most pro-Israel country in Europe, and said that rallies and gatherings in support of Israel occurred in the country despite prohibitions on gatherings in Ukraine due to the Russo-Ukrainian War, such as in Kyiv, Lviv, Odesa, Kharkiv, and Dnipro.

On 2 November, the left-wing magazine Commons published an open letter from "Ukrainian researchers, artists, political and labour activists, members of civil society" expressing solidarity with Palestinians, and condemned Israel's actions in Gaza, Islamophobia and antisemitism. As of 27 December 2023, the letter has 443 signatures.

According to Ukrainian researcher, Yuliia Kishchuk, she stated that many Ukrainians have gradually shifted their opinion of Israel's actions in Gaza, with some of them drew parallels with the Holodomor, which was considered as an act of genocide by Ukraine.

=== United Kingdom ===
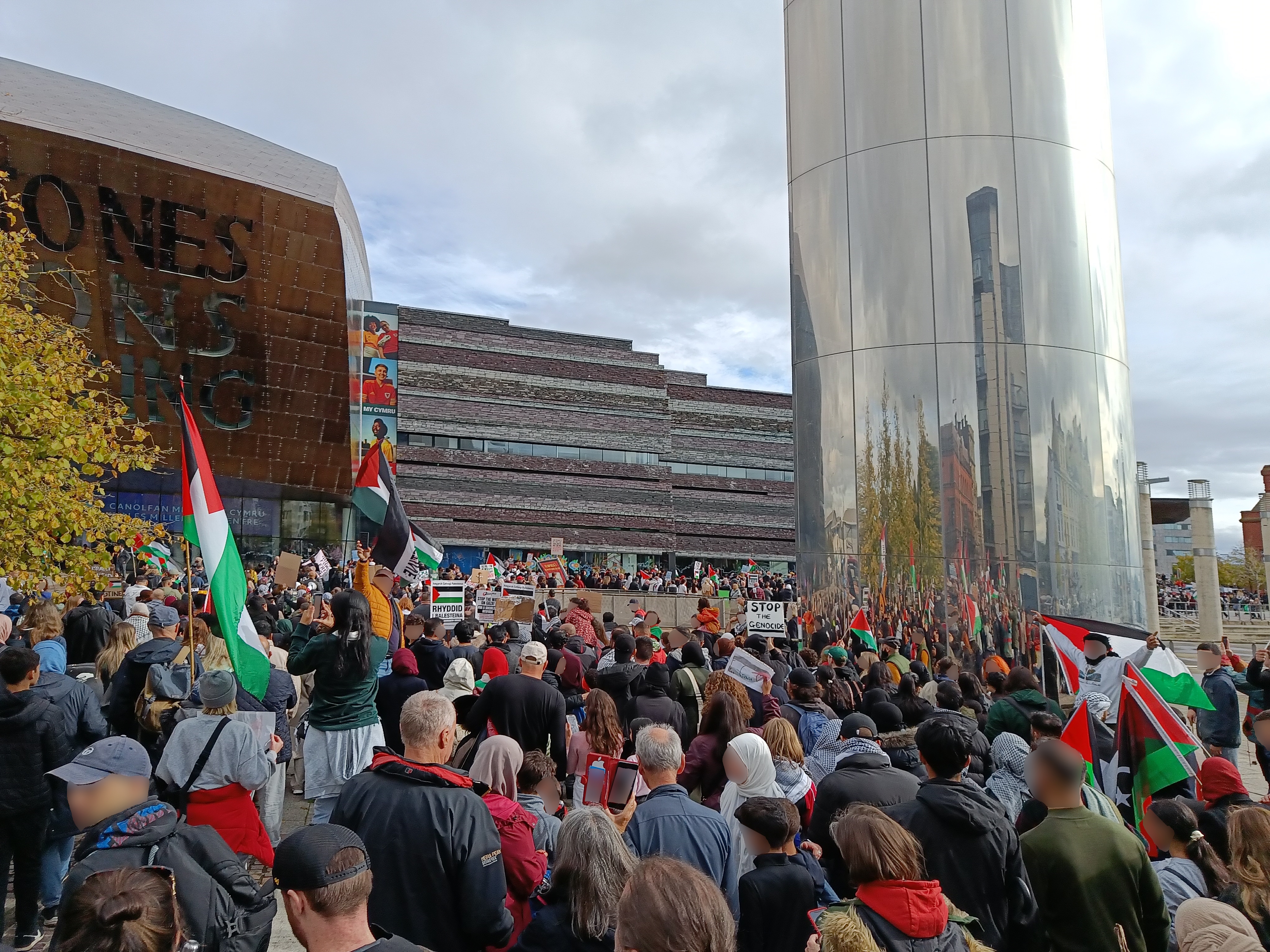
Solidarity protest opposing the bombing of Gaza, Cardiff, 21 October 2023

In the weeks during Israel's counterattacks on Gaza, a number of pro-Palestine vigils, rallies and marches were held throughout the UK, with the largest demonstrations held in London. At least 300,000 protestors attended a pro-Palestinian march on 11 November, which made it one of the largest pro-Palestinian protests in the Western world since 7 October. As well as London, rallies took place in Manchester in northern England, Edinburgh and Glasgow in Scotland.

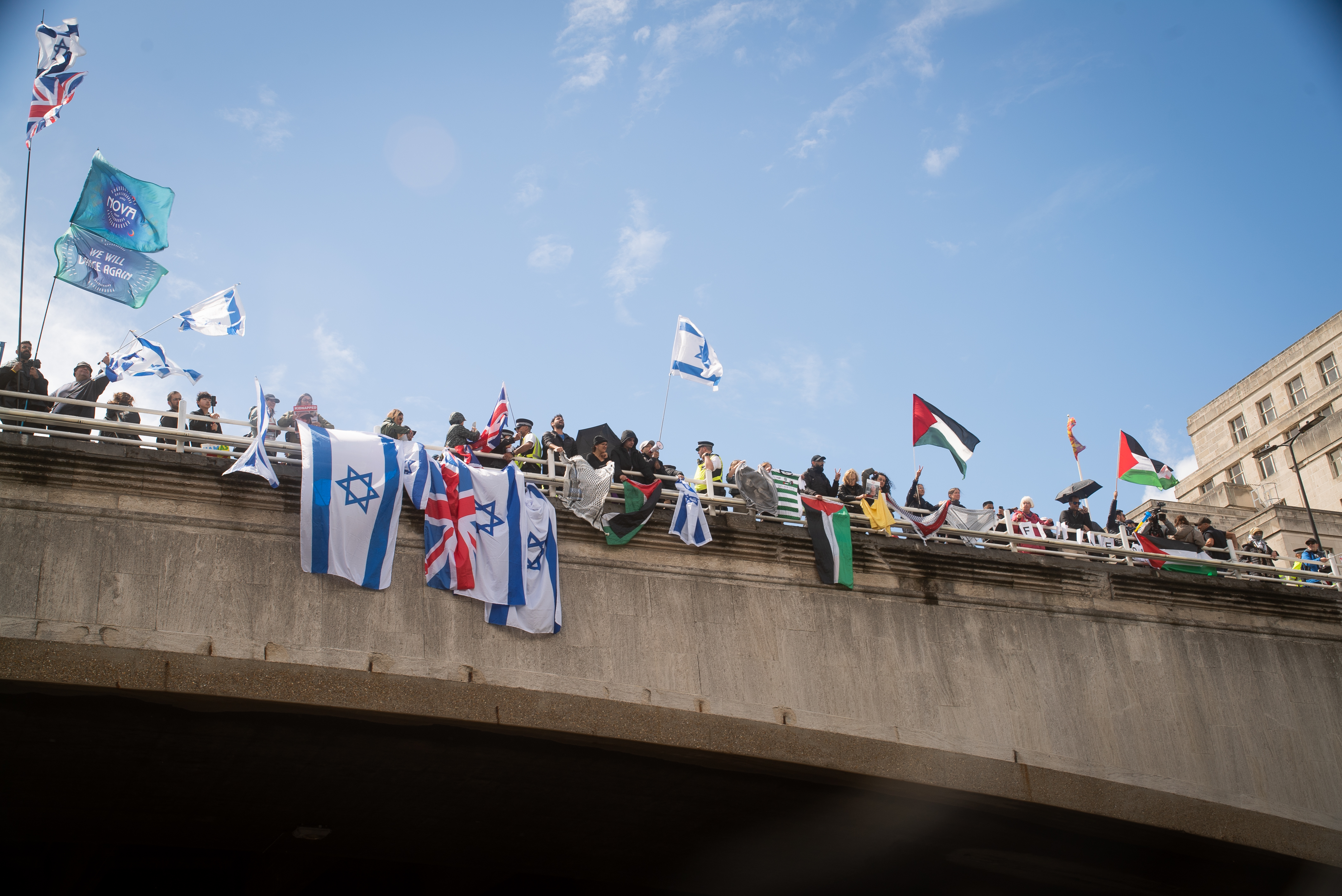
Competing pro-Israel and pro-Palestine protests separated by police on a bridge in London, 4 July 2024.

Lawyers expressed concerns over war crimes committed by Israel, and trade unions joined the calls for a ceasefire — as did charities, cultural figures and religious leaders.

Companies that supply arms to Israel were targeted, along with other companies viewed as supporting Israel, with boycotts, protests and blockades.

The official position of both the UK's main political parties, the ruling Conservatives and the opposition Labour, were supportive of Israel, although there was dissent from politicians of both parties, which was often met with punishment from party leaders. A number of Labour politicians resigned from their roles or the party entirely in disagreement at the party's position. Protests were directed at politicians, particularly after a majority of Labour MPs abstained on a vote calling for a ceasefire.

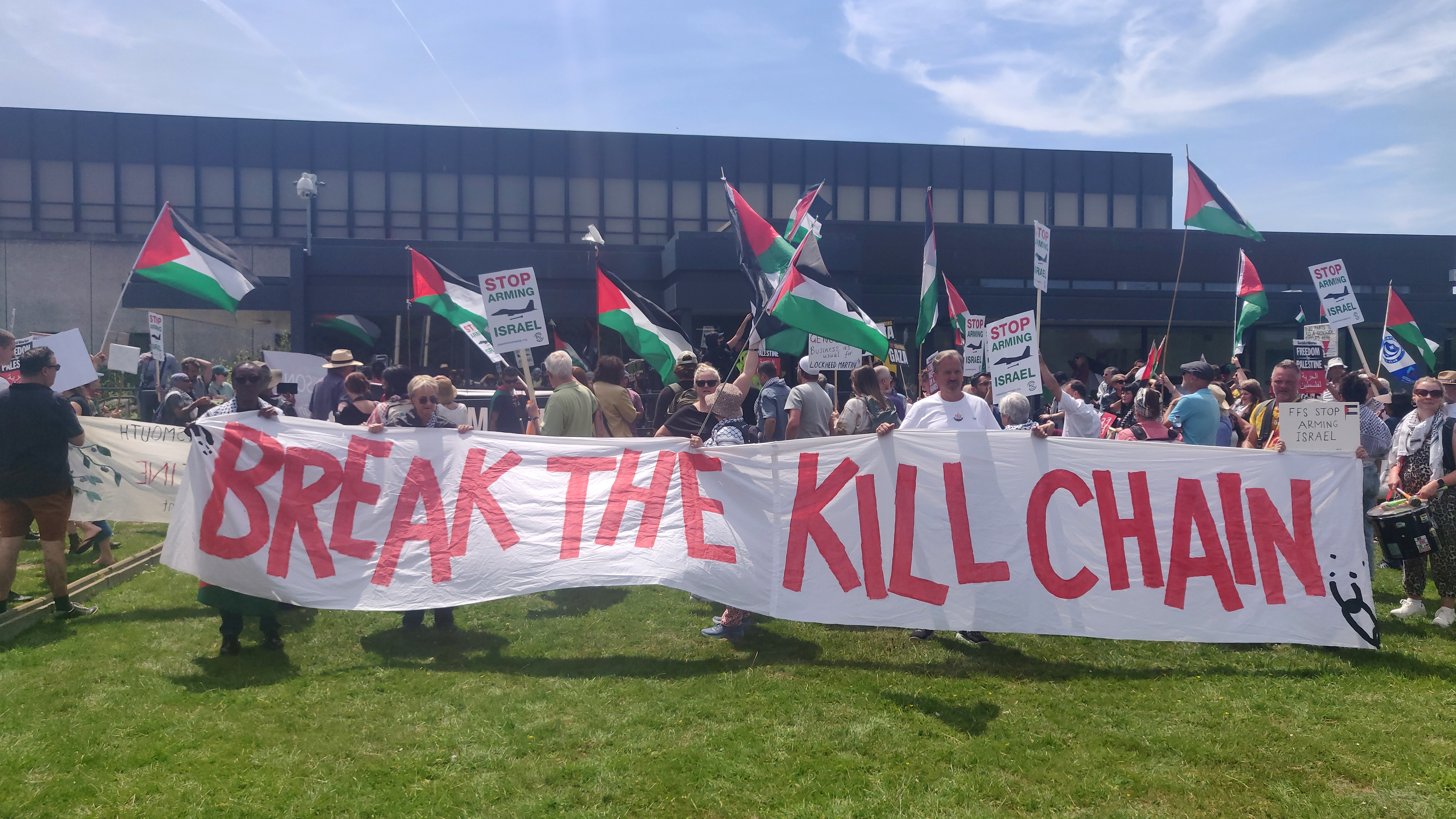
Protest at Lockheed Martin UK in Havant, England, 17 June 2025

On 26 November, 60,000 marched in London to protest against a rise in antisemitic hate crimes from the war, making it the biggest protest against antisemitism since 1936. In January 2024, thousands attended a pro-Israel rally in London to call for the release of all hostages from Gaza. In March 2024, an estimated 400,000 people in London attended the tenth national march for Palestine since the war began. In May 2024, pro-Palestinian marches were staged in Central London to mark the 76th anniversary of the Nakba.

On 17 May 2025, approximately 600,000 people marched through London to commemorate the 77th anniversary of the Nakba and calling for the government to 'take action' to stop the atrocities against Palestinians. On 4 June, thousands of people joined a pro-Palestine march outside of the Parliament of the United Kingdom while wearing red to create a "Red Line for Palestine", demanded that the government impose an arms embargo and sanctions against Israel.

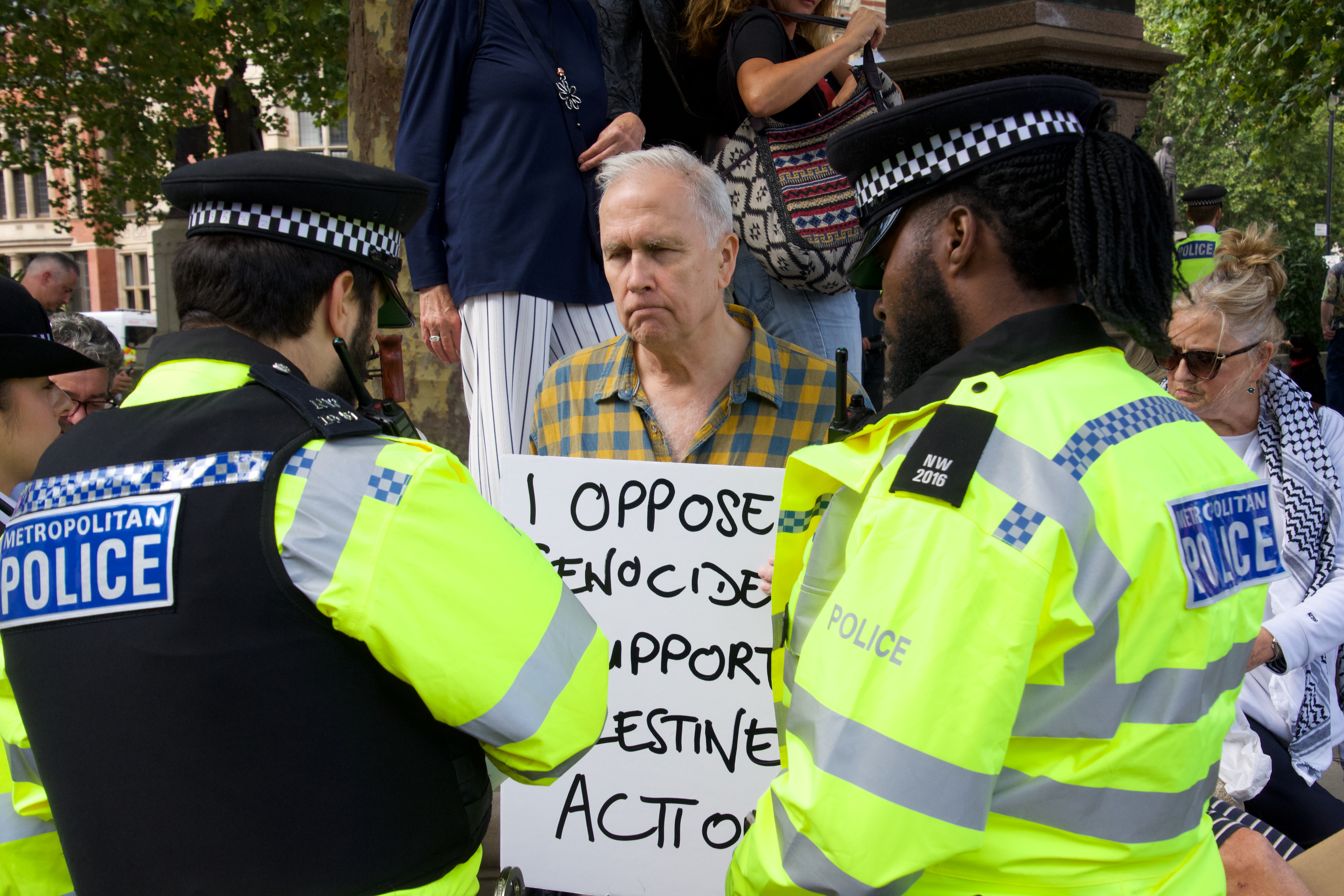
Metropolitan Police making arrests at a Palestine Action protest in London, 6 September 2025

On 20 June 2025, pro-Palestinian activists led by Palestine Action managed to enter the Brize Norton Royal Air Force base in Oxfordshire. They damaged two Voyager aircraft with crowbars and used a repurposed fire extinguisher to spray red paint to the planes and the runway before being detained in the base.

On 9 August 2025, hundreds of people gathered in Parliament Square to protest against the ongoing genocide in Gaza and in opposition to the banning of Palestine Action, the Metropolitan Police stated on X that they have arrested over 446 people in the square, with campaigners calling it the "largest ever mass arrest at a single protest in the British capital". Five officers were injured during the arrests.

A hunger strike by eight people imprisoned for activity related to Palestine Action began in November 2025, the largest hunger strike in the UK since the 1981 Irish hunger strike. It led to the hospitalisation of several prisoners.

=== Vatican City ===
On 25 December 2024, protesters waved Palestinian flags in the courtyard of St. Peter's Basilica where Pope Francis lamented both the 7 October attack by Hamas and the "appalling harvest of innocent civilians" by Israel and called for a ceasefire during his Christmas Day homily.

== Middle East ==
=== Bahrain ===
Worshipers at the Duraz mosque chanted "Death to Israel" and "Death to America" during Friday prayers. A march followed, with participants shouting anti-Israel slogans including "No to normalization!" Bahraini officials detained numerous individuals involved in demonstrations supporting Palestine, including both minors and individuals who actively participated in advocating for Palestine online.

In September 2025, protests and clashes erupted between pro-Palestine demonstrators and police in Manama after the appointment of Shmuel Revel as the new Israeli ambassador of Bahrain after his predecessor, Eitan Na'eh, left the country in November 2023.

=== Egypt ===
The Egyptian government, led by Abdel-Fattah el-Sissi, currently maintains diplomatic relations with both Israel and Hamas. It also banned large protests in 2013. Despite this, the majority of Egyptians support the Palestinian people and their aspirations for self-determination. Following Israel's bombardment of the Gaza Strip, the state authorized 27 sites for demonstrations in major cities across the country.

On 11 October, it was reported that protesters chanted pro-Palestinian slogans and burned Israeli flags outside the Syndicate of Journalists' headquarters in Cairo. On 13 October, protestors gathered at Al-Azhar Mosque after Friday prayers and chanted for the Al-Aqsa mosque.

On 20 October, tens of thousands demonstrated in cities across the country. In Cairo, 43 people were reportedly arrested in an unauthorized pro-Palestine rally in Tahrir Square. There were also protests on the Egypt–Gaza border near Rafah.

On 15 January 2024, journalists gathered for "100 Days of Aggression: Stop the War, Prosecute War Criminals" at the Cairo headquarters of the journalists syndicate. They called for Israel to stop killing Palestinians and journalists, condemned Israeli leaders as war criminals, and called for unhindered access to aid in Gaza. They also accused the Egyptian government of complicity in the suffering of Gaza.

=== Iran ===
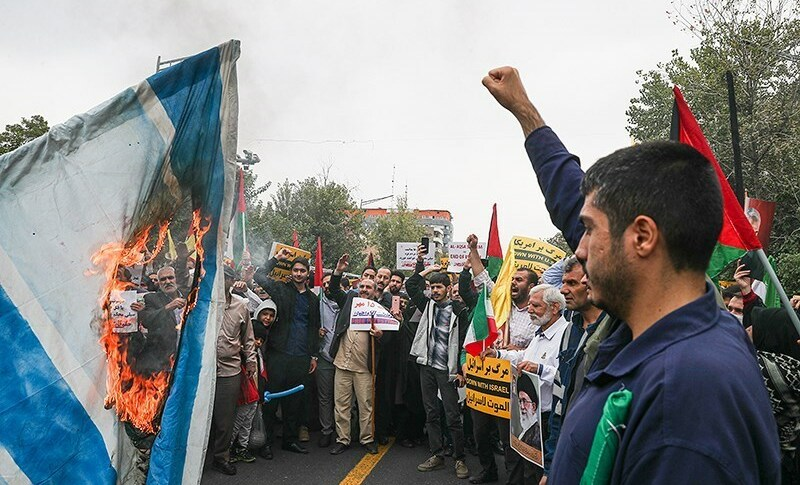
Protest opposing Israeli policy in Gaza, 14 October, Tehran

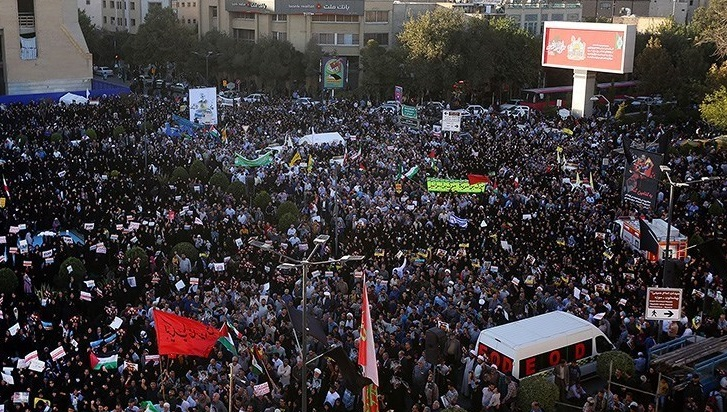
Pro-Palestinian protest in Isfahan, Iran

Multiple rallies were held supporting Hamas and against the Israeli bombing of Gaza. Many protesters flew Palestinian flags and ones for Hezbollah, chanting anti-Israeli slogans. State media presented those rallies as "screams of a common pain...the pain of the Zionist regime's trampling on humanity". During a football match in Azadi Stadium in Tehran, counter-protesters chanted an anti-Palestinian slogan. Counter-protesters also chanted anti-Palestinian slogans at the funeral of murdered filmmaker Dariush Mehrjui. Counter-protesters also created the "#IraniansStandWithIsrael" hashtag and hung Israeli flags.

Protesters gathered in Tehran and other cities to protest against Israel's bombardment of Gaza and express solidarity with Gaza. Likewise, "Death to Israel", Death to America", and "End the Genocide" and so forth.

On 31 July 2024, protests were held in Tehran after the assassination of Hamas leader Ismail Haniyeh.

=== Iraq ===
On 13 October, thousands gathered in Liberation Square, Baghdad, waving Palestinian flags and burning Israeli flags while chanting anti-Israeli and anti-American slogans. Demonstrators also gathered at a bridge leading to the Green Zone, while others held a sit-in at the Trebil border crossing with Jordan. Demonstrators in Baghdad vowed to keep up their protest "until the roads are opened in order to send aid" to Gaza. Protesters marched in Baghdad in February 2024, holding signs, such as one reading: "The starvation of Gaza's children is a shame for all humanity." The largest protest was held in the streets of Baghdad.

On 31 July 2024, a march was held in Baghdad to condemn the assassination of Ismail Haniyeh.

On 19 October, dozens of people stormed and looted the headquarters of the Saudi-based news channel MBC in Baghdad after it referred to the insurgents as "terrorists", including Hamas, Hezbollah, and the Popular Mobilization Forces.

=== Jordan ===
Thousands participated in a march on 1 December to demonstrate solidarity with the Palestinians in the Gaza Strip. The procession commenced following Friday prayers in the vicinity of the Grand Husseini Mosque in Amman. Riot police fired tear gas to disperse 500 pro-Palestinian protesters at a security checkpoint outside of Amman on 13 October, as they were heading to the border with the West Bank. Protests also emerged in Irbid and Zarqa, while anti-Israel marches were denied at the border areas in the Jordan Valley, according to the Ministry of Interior.

Protests were held following the end of the ceasefire in Gaza on 1 December. On 8 December, protesters demonstrated outside the U.S. Embassy in Amman, calling for a boycott of U.S. products.

On 23 January 2024 protests were held at the Egyptian embassy in Amman against the blockade of Gaza. On 6 February, Human Rights Watch reported that hundreds of pro-Palestinian activists had been arrested by Jordanian authorities. On 27 March, police used tear gas and batons on protesters attempting to storm the Israeli embassy. On 23 April, Al-Qassam Brigades spokesman Abu Obaida called on the "Jordanian masses" to escalate their actions and "raise their voice" against Israel.

On 6 July demonstrations were held in Amman in solidarity with Gaza. On 14 July protests were held near the Israeli embassy in Amman in solidarity with Gaza which took place a day after the attacks in al-Mawasi. On 2 August demonstrations broke out near the Israeli embassy denouncing the assassination of Ismail Haniyeh.

=== Kuwait ===
On 14 January 2024, hundreds of protestors held a demonstration in Al-Erada Square, Kuwait City to show solidarity with Palestinians and marking the 100th day since the 7 October attacks on Israel.

=== Lebanon ===
Demonstrations broke out across the country on 13 October, with protestors flying Hezbollah, LCP and SSNP flags while chanting pro-Palestinian slogans. Following the explosion at al-Ahli Arab Hospital, demonstrators gathered at the US and French embassies in Beirut over their countries' support for Israel. Demonstrators gathered outside the South African embassy to thank them for bringing Israel to the International Court of Justice. Demonstrators protested at UN headquarters in Beirut in support of UNRWA.

On 30 April, inspired by the protests in American universities, over 200 people gathered around the campus ground at the American University of Beirut, the gatherers had the administration's permission to protest for two hours as the protests calls for the boycott of Israeli businesses.

On 15 May a pro-Palestinian demonstration was staged in Beirut during the 76th anniversary of the Nakba, the demonstration started at the American University of Beirut and ended at the British Embassy.

On 31 July 2024, demonstrations were held in Sidon to condemn the assassination of Ismail Haniyeh with masked boys holding replicas of assault rifles.

=== Oman ===
On 19 October 2023, citizens and expats gathered to protest against Israel's war on Gaza. Meanwhile, US diplomats indicated that there were calls for protests in Muscat on 19 and 20 October.

=== Qatar ===
On 16 December thousands gathered at the Education City Stadium in Doha to show their support and help raise money for Palestinians.

=== Syria ===
On 13 October, protesters in Damascus including Palestinians from the Yarmouk camp rallied for the people in Gaza. On 27 October, a march was organised in Jaramana Camp to show solidarity with Palestinians in Gaza.

In October 2025, hundreds of Syrians from several cities in the country including Aleppo, Deir ez-Zor, and Hama gathered to express solidarity with Palestinians and condemned Israel's war on Gaza.

=== Turkey ===
On 13 October, thousands of demonstrators crowded at Beyazit Square in Istanbul to show solidarity with Palestinians. Protests erupted in Ankara after the al-Ahli Arab Hospital explosion. The Israeli Consulate experienced a forceful intrusion by protesters who directed fireworks toward the premises and ignited Israeli flags. Moreover, a group of demonstrators made an effort to enter an American military base. In Istanbul, protesters gathered outside the US consulate to demand its immediate closure. Demonstrators linked to Islamic organizations in Istanbul displayed Turkish and Palestinian flags, raised signs, and vocalized slogans condemning Israel's activities in Gaza.

On 5 November, police in Adana Province fired water cannon and tear gas to disperse a large crowd of protesters as they attempted to storm Incirlik Air Base which housed US troops. On 6 November, protesters in Ankara demonstrated against U.S. Secretary of State Antony Blinken's visit, holding signs that read "murderer Blinken, get out of Turkey!" and "No to genocide!" On 31 December, protesters demonstrated outside the US embassy in Istanbul.

In February 2024, a gunman occupied a Procter & Gamble factory in Gebze, holding seven workers there hostage in protest of the Israeli invasion of Gaza. After he left the factory to use the bathroom, he was arrested and the hostages were freed with no one, including the gunman, suffering any injuries.

On 7 April 2024, a group by the name of "A Thousand Youths for Palestine Initiative" organised protests in Beyoğlu, Istanbul against Recep Tayyip Erdoğan and his Justice and Development Party due to their continued trade and relations with Israel despite making many statements in support of Palestine, in which Turkish trade with Israel had actually increased after the Gaza war. A month earlier, the group had also disrupted an Erdoğan rally in Ankara with the same demands. The protestors gathered on İstiklal Avenue, near Galatasaray High School, where police quickly attempted to disperse the protest, in which 43 people were detained, and 5 of them were kept and tried. Heavy police brutality was reported, with the protestors being assaulted and extreme measures taken to quell the protests.

On 3 May 2024, a pro-Palestine protest at Gazi University in Ankara turned into a riot between Palestine supporters and Turkish nationalists. Students gathered to pray Friday prayers together and set up rallies as part of the 2024 pro-Palestinian university protests. Turkish and Palestinian flags were flown. Many professors and other students attended the rally, where speeches in Turkish, Arabic, and English were made. A group of Turkish nationalists had also hosted a rally nearby commemorating Turkism Day. The pro-Palestinians later began shouting slogans in Arabic, and takbirs, which provoked the Turkish nationalists into intruding the university and assaulting the students while shouting "how happy is the one who says I am a Turk". Security had to intervene and escort the pro-Palestinians to safety inside the university. Most of the attackers were described as Victory Party members and other Kemalists. Some MHP Grey Wolves and other Idealists were present, where they gave the university students a chance to stop the Arabic chanting, before joining the assaults after the students refused. The attackers referred to themselves as "Turkists" and "nationalists", and did not specify any political affiliation. After the attacks, members of the "Ankara Palestine Solidarity Platform" protested outside the university and demanded justice.

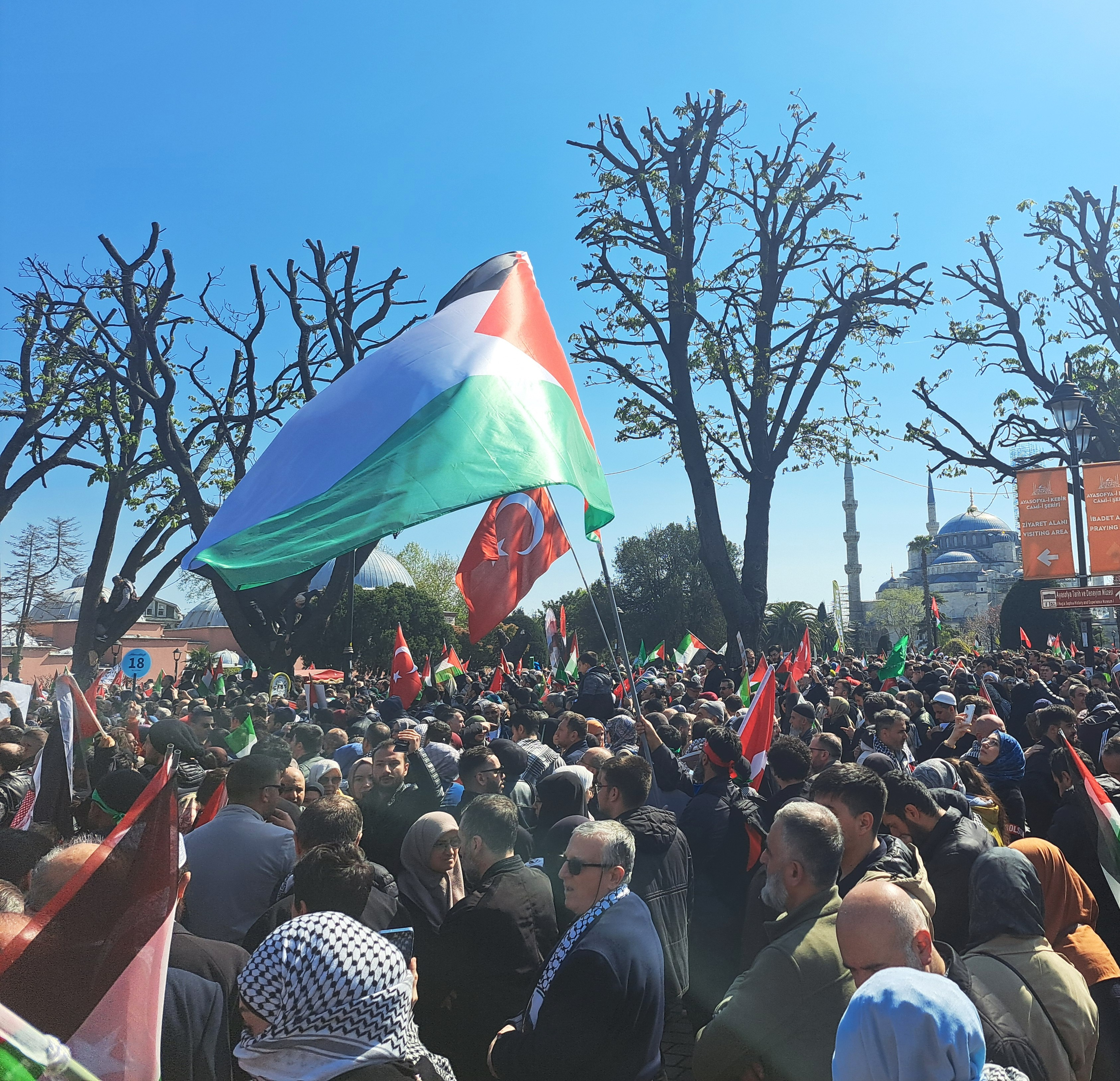
Protest for Gaza in Istanbul, 13 April 2025

On 6 May 2024, protests were held in Istanbul in demanding the end of the war and a ceasefire.

On 26 May, protesters threw molotov cocktails at the Israeli consulate in Istanbul following the Tel al-Sultan massacre. Demonstrations also occurred in front of the home of the US Consul General and at Saraçhane Park.

On 31 July 2024, protests were held in Istanbul against the assassination of Ismail Haniyeh.

On New Year's Day 2025, tens of thousands of people marched on Galata Bridge in Istanbul to express solidarity with Palestine.

On 13 and 20 April 2025, thousands of people across Turkey protested against Israel's attacks against civilians in the Gaza Strip under the motto, "Gaza is dying! Stand up!"

On 1 January 2026, thousands of protesters started the new year again by marching across Galata Bridge in Istanbul in support of Gaza. It was reported that over 500,000 people attended the protest organized by over 400 civil society organizations.

=== United Arab Emirates ===
In December 2023, more than 100 people gathered at the 2023 United Nations Climate Change Conference in Dubai to call for a ceasefire in the Gaza war and expressed solidarity with the Palestinians.

=== Yemen ===
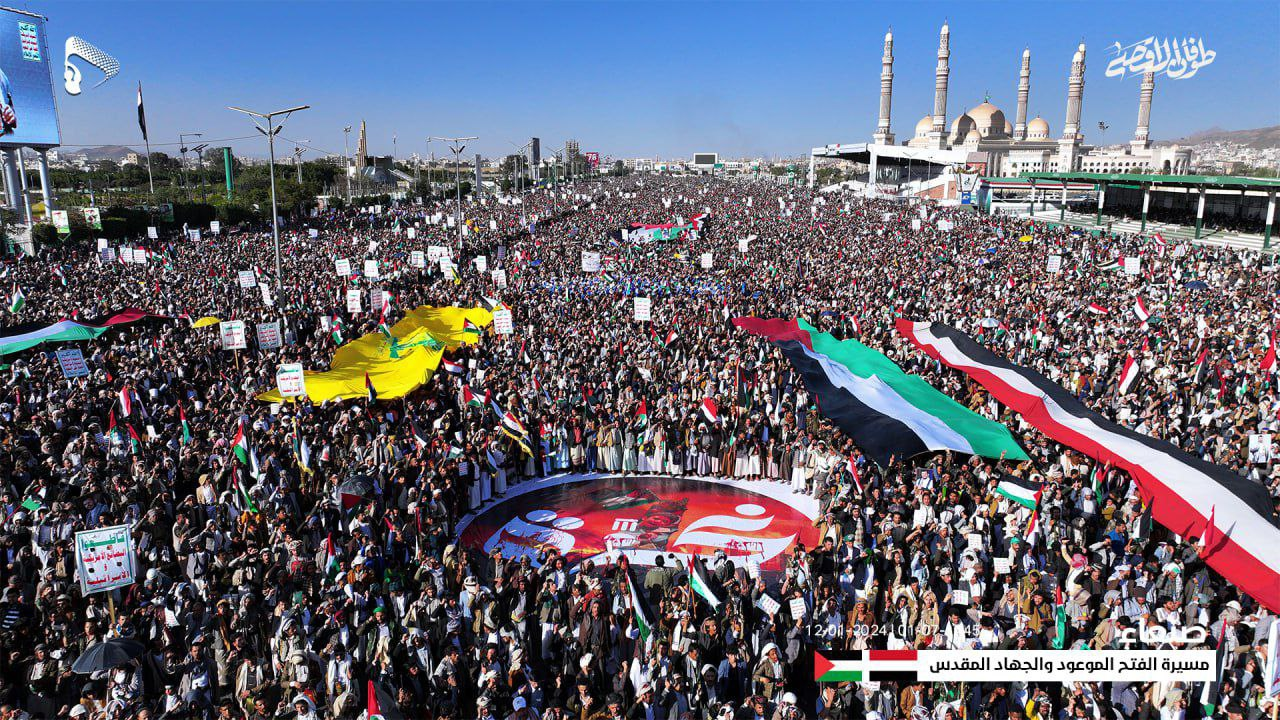
Protests in Sana'a, Yemen following the 2024 missile strikes

In Houthi-controlled Sanaa, demonstrators waved both Yemeni and Palestinian flags and chanted "Death to America" and "Death to Israel;" and tens of thousands of people took part in the march to show solidarity with Palestinians. On 12 January 2024, tens of thousands protested at Sab'een Square in Sanaa against the US-UK bombings. College students in Sanaa protested against US-UK Bombings on 18 January.

Protesters on 19 January 2024 reportedly stated, "We don't care about whatever you do to us, we will continue our support and resilience with Palestinians until Israel stops its war on Palestine". On 28 June 2024, protests were held in Sana'a with people carrying banners that said "There is no dignity for nations without victory for Gaza", smaller demonstrations were held in other governorates, including Hodeidah, Hajjah, Saada, Taiz, and Ad Dali. In Sanaa, thousands of protesters waved Palestinian flags, and chanted: "With our souls, with our blood, we sacrifice for you ... oh Palestinians."

On 3 August 2024, thousands participated in a "Day of Rage" by protesting in Sanaa, mourning the assassination of Ismail Haniyeh.

== North America ==
=== Barbados ===
In November 2023, a pro-Palestinian march took place in Bridgetown, involving more than 100 people, with protesters chanting, "Palestine will be free".

=== Belize ===
On 22 November 2023, a pro-Palestine march took place in Belize City with about 150 people attending. The march was also attended by Prime Minister Johnny Briceño, Deputy Prime Minister Cordel Hyde, Minister of Home Affairs Kareem Musa, and several other politicians.

=== Canada ===
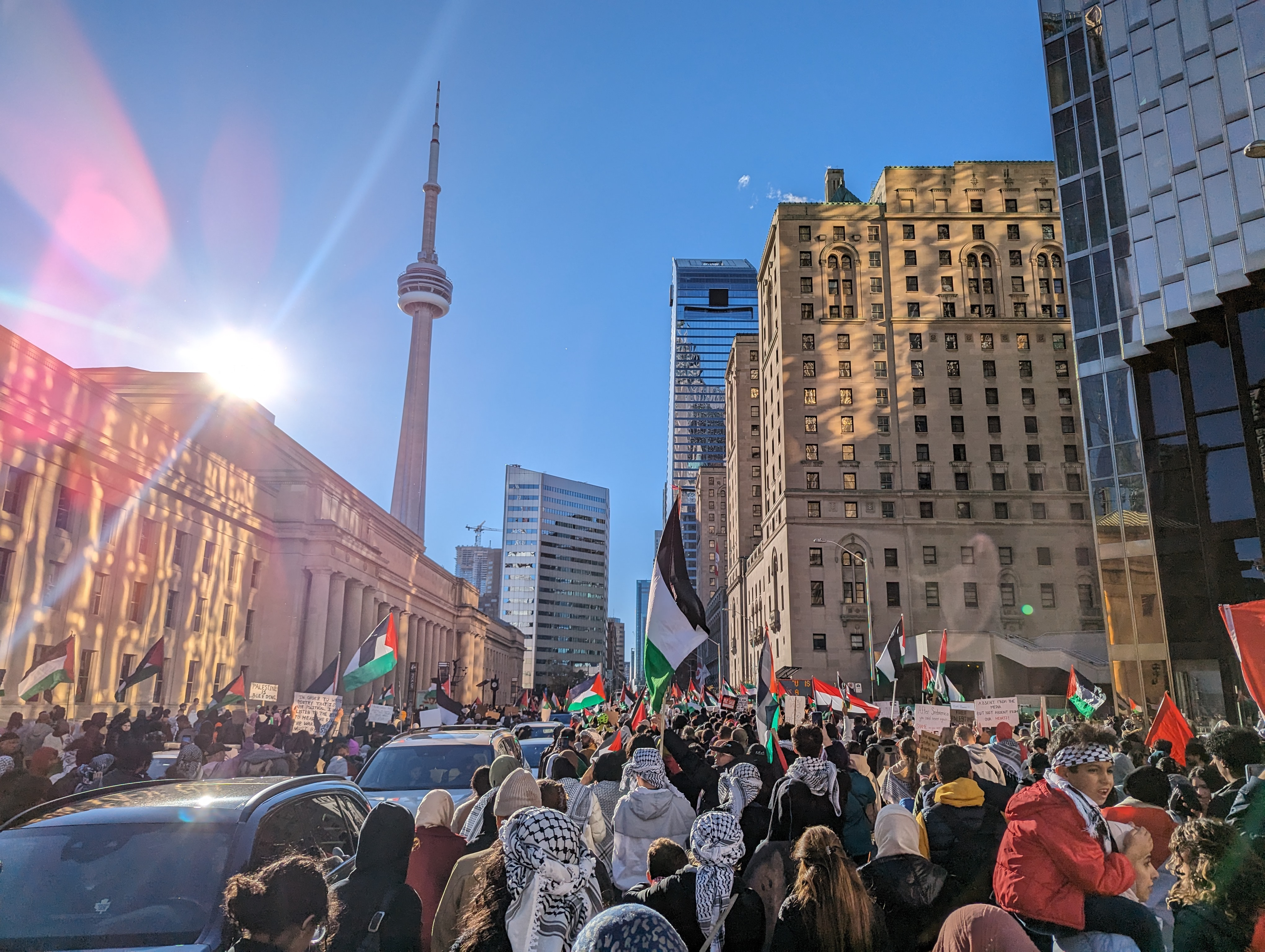
28 October rally in support of Palestine in Toronto, Canada

On 10 October, a large pro-Israel rally took place in Toronto, which attracted a crowd of 15,000 people, including MP Melissa Lantsman and Mayor Olivia Chow. Pro-Palestinian rallies occurred in major cities including Ottawa, Montreal, Edmonton, Calgary, Windsor and Vancouver. On 30 October, Independent Jewish Voices staged sit-ins demanding a ceasefire at 17 Canadian politicians' offices, including that of Foreign Minister Melanie Joly. On 12 November, a pro-Israel rally in Toronto attracted a crowd of 5,000.

On 15 November, protestors heckled Prime Minister Justin Trudeau at a restaurant in Vancouver: "You have blood on your hands." Protestors in St. John's also called for a ceasefire during a summit held there between Trudeau and EU Commission President Ursula von der Leyen. The Saskatchewan Legislature was disrupted by protesters calling for a ceasefire. Around 20,000 pro-Israel protesters held a rally in Ottawa's Parliament Hill on 4 December. Ontario Premier Doug Ford called pro-Palestinian protests in the province "hate rallies". The National Council of Canadian Muslims announced on 29 January 2024 it would refuse a meeting with Trudeau over his government's failure to urge Israel to follow the International Court of Justice's order to not commit genocide.

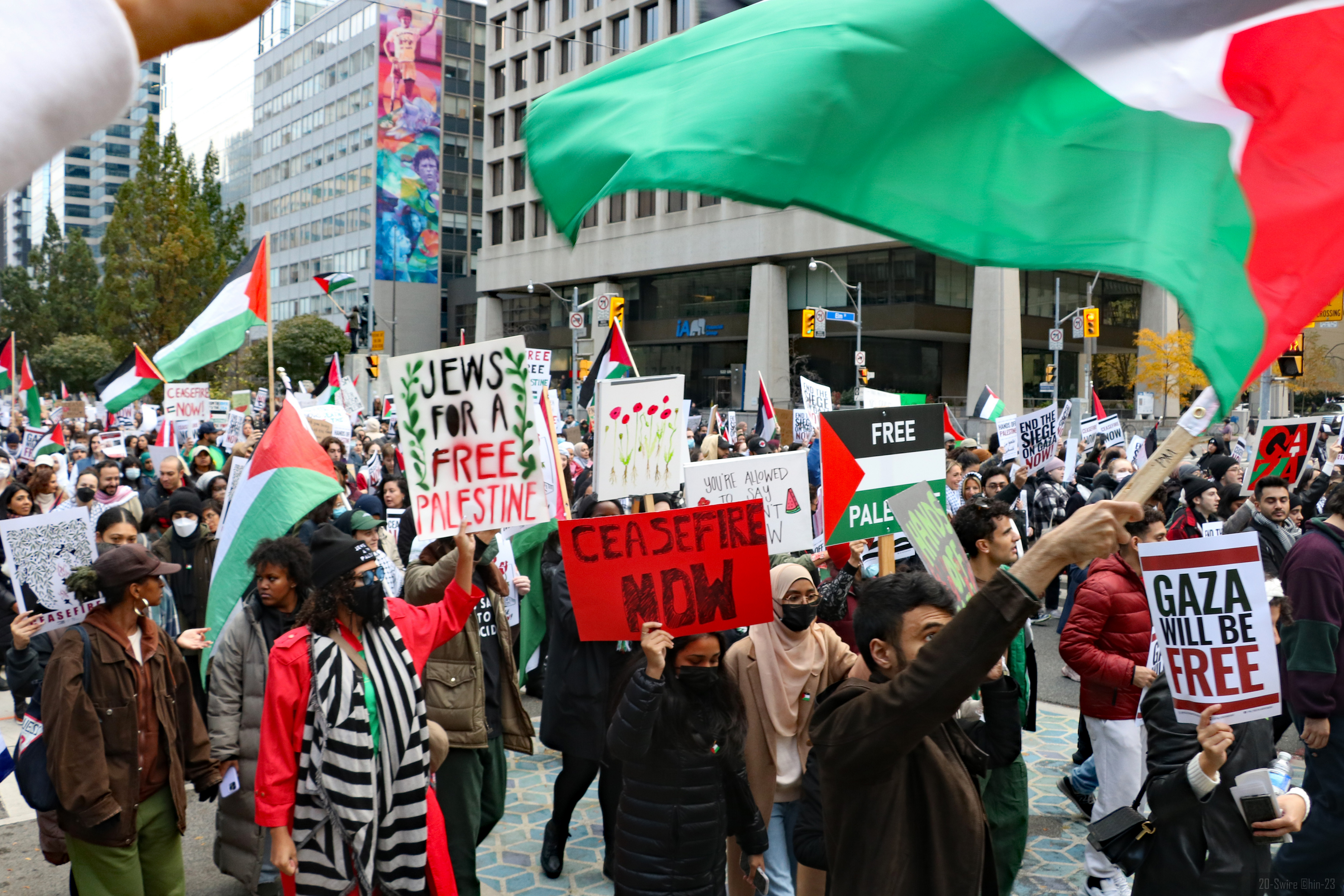
Pro-Palestinian protest in Toronto, 4 November 2023

On 5 March, a man in Toronto was arrested after attacking pro-Palestinian protesters outside of a synagogue using a nail gun while shouting "every Palestinian will die".

On 7 March, a court in Quebec issued a temporary ban on pro-Palestinian protests within 50 metres of a synagogue and four other Jewish community buildings in Montreal.

On 14 April, protestors in Toronto cheered an aerial attack launched by Iran on Israel, chanting "Allahu Akbar!" A protest leader characterized the strikes as a response to Israeli airstrikes in the region, while Melissa Lantsman, a Canadian member of parliament, said that the chants showed "It was never about a ceasefire". Other chants included "Intifada, Intifada, long live the Intifada" and "From the water to the water, Palestine is Arab".

On 9 June, Canada's National Post said that over 50,000 pro-Israel supporters were believed to have marched in Toronto's annual Walk With Israel.

On 6 October 2024, rallies broke out in Toronto in solidarity with Palestine.

On 14 June 2025, thousands of people joined a pro-Palestine march in Montreal to denounce the humanitarian crisis in Gaza and calling on the government to pressure Israel to reach a ceasefire.

==== Universities ====
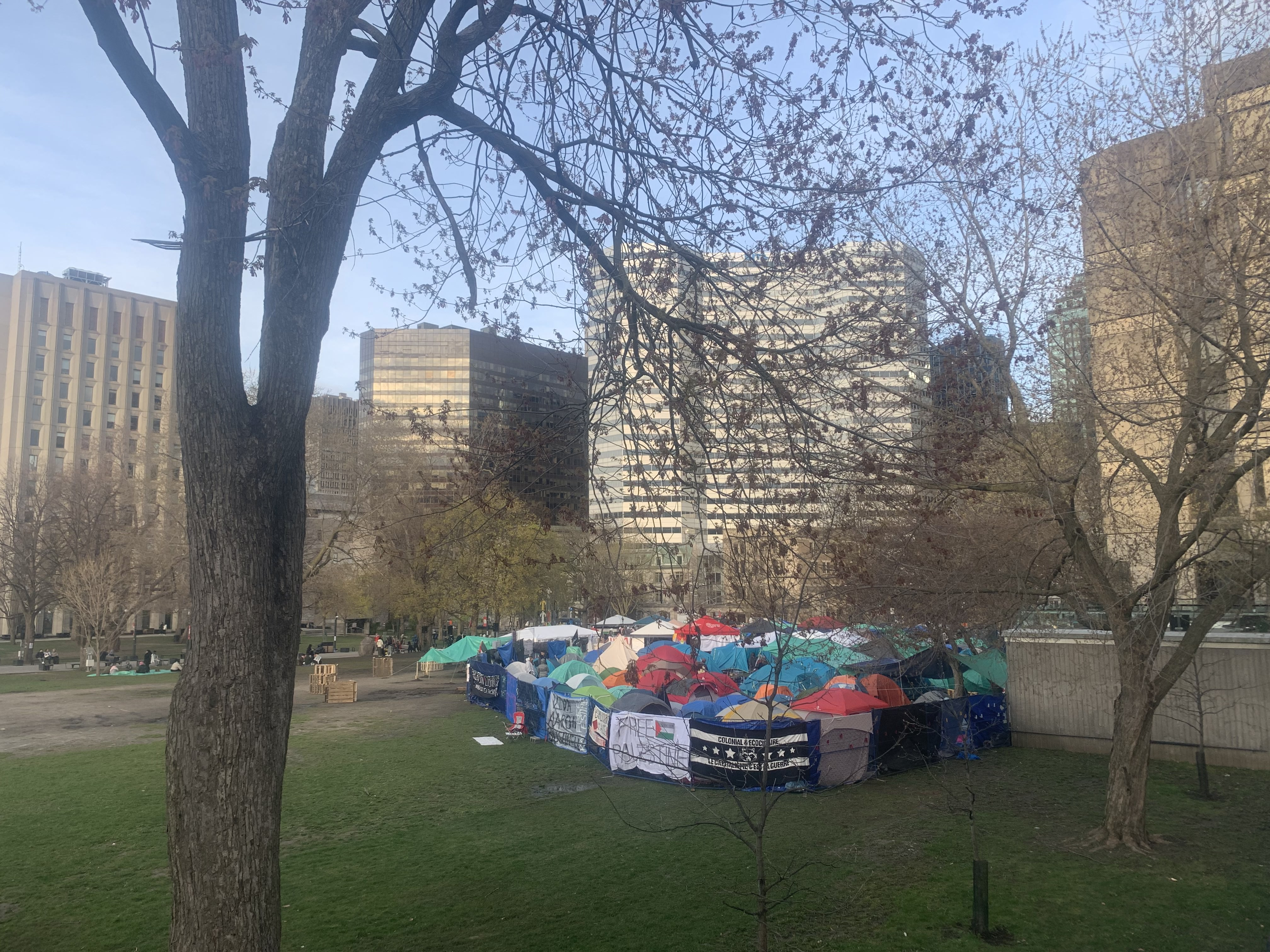
Approximately 80 tents form the encampment at McGill University, Montreal, 2 May 2024

On April 22, students set up an encampment at the University of Alberta, in Edmonton. A week later, on April 29, an encampment of about 30 tents was set up on the Point Grey campus of the University of British Columbia, in Vancouver. About 100 protesters were present on its first day, calling on the institution to divest from Israel.

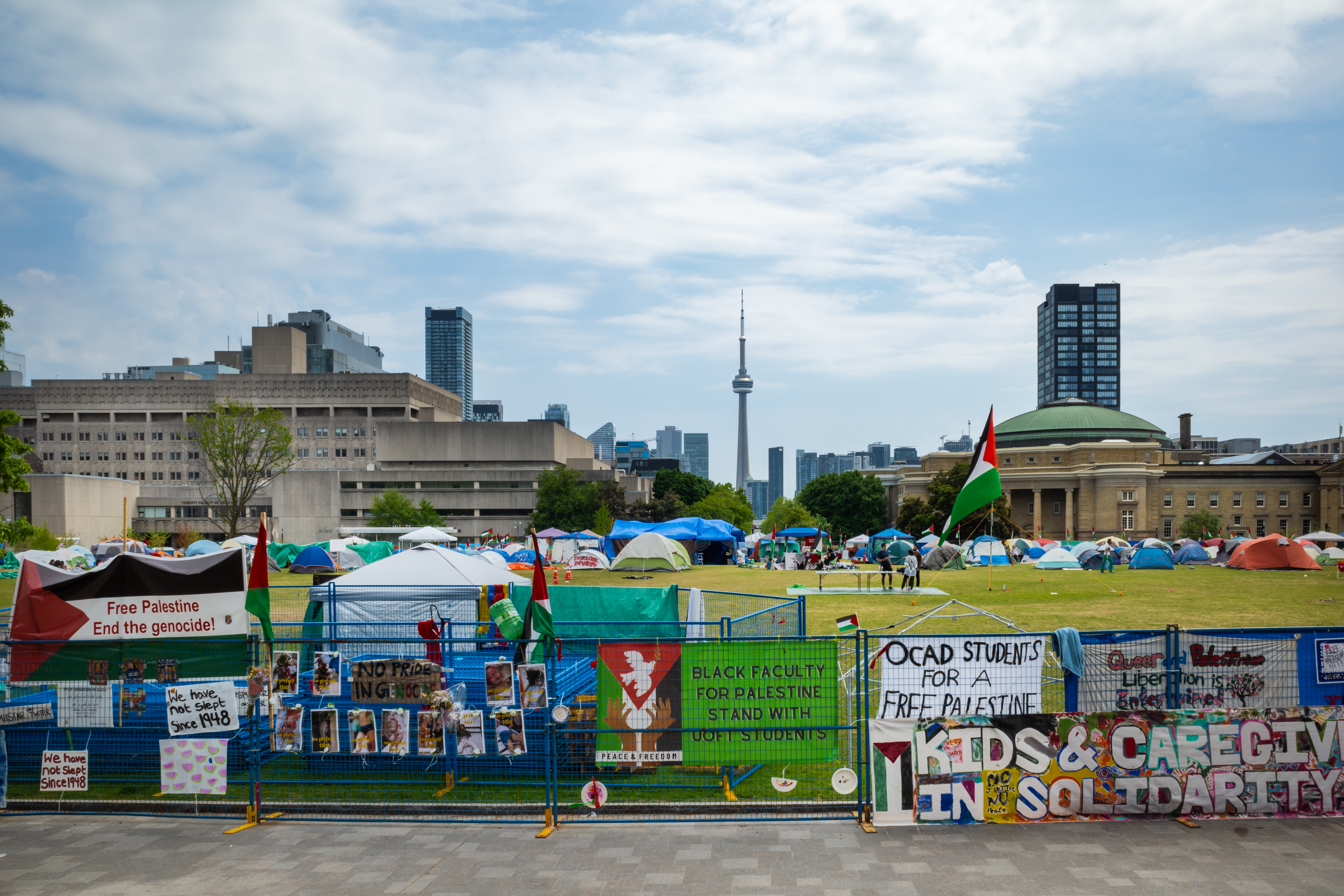
University of Toronto encampment as of May 20, 2024

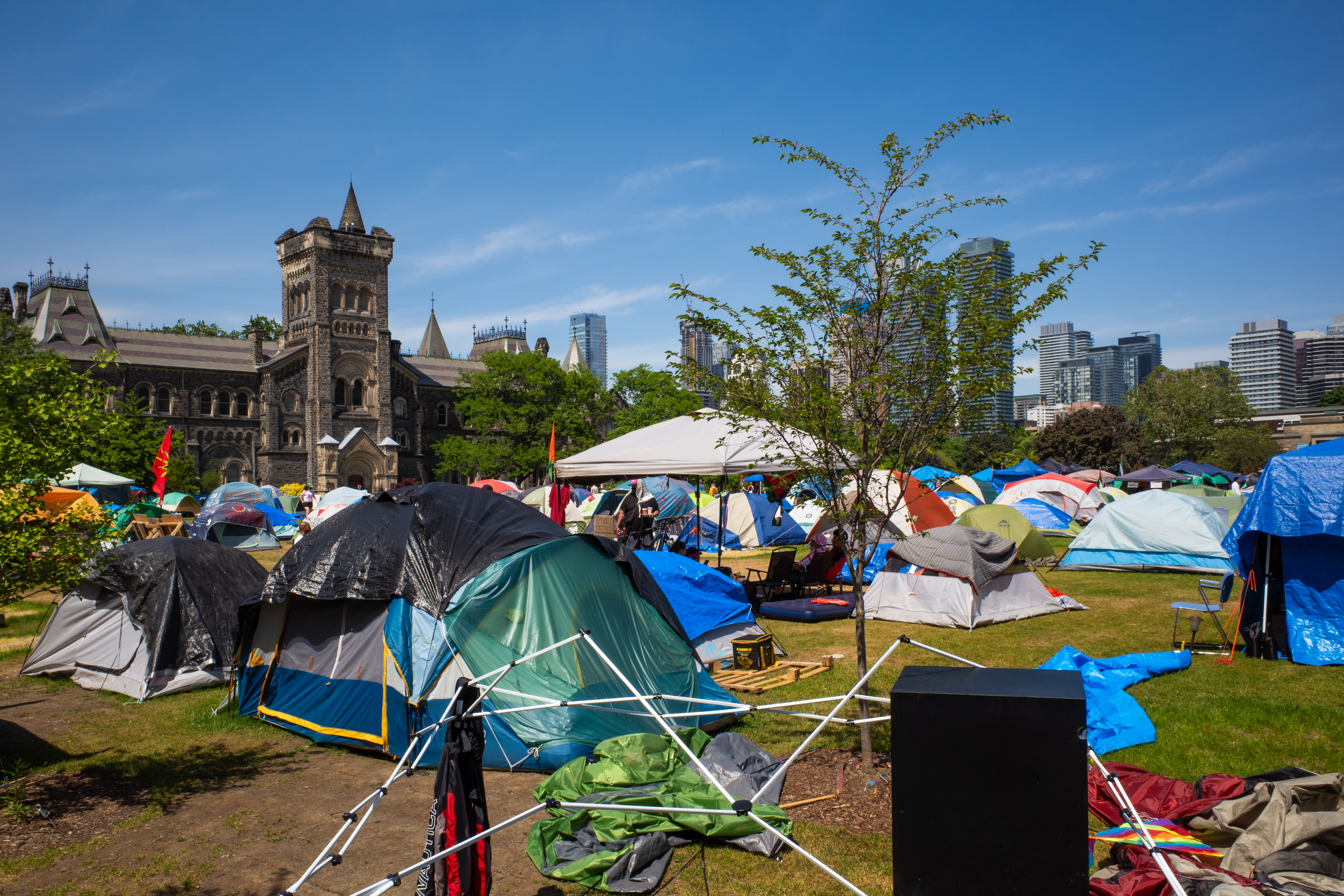
University of Toronto encampement on May 26, 2024

On May 1, an encampment was built outside Tabaret Hall at the University of Ottawa. On Vancouver Island, encampments were set up at the University of Victoria and Vancouver Island University; and an encampment was also briefly set up at the University of Western Ontario, lasting a day before disappearing. The following day, students at the University of Toronto set up an encampment of about 50 tents at King's College Circle on its St. George campus. On May 5, an encampment was set up at McMaster University, and a protest was held at the University of Waterloo the day after. On May 7, an encampment was set up at the University of Manitoba, scheduled to last for three days. Protests were held at Trent University and Emily Carr University the following day. On May 9, an encampment was set up at the University of Windsor, and police in Calgary used flashbangs to remove protesters from an encampment set up at the University of Calgary. The next day, a die-in protest was held at Memorial University of Newfoundland.

On May 12, an encampment was set up at Dalhousie University, an encampment was set up at the University of Waterloo the following day. An encampment was set up at UBC Okanagan on May 14, and protests were also held at the University of Saskatchewan and University of Regina on May 17. On May 21, an encampment was set up at the University of Guelph, and students attending Memorial University of Newfoundland and Labrador set up an encampment outside the Art's and Administration Building in St. John's.

On May 23, students at Simon Fraser University occupied their campus' Belzberg Library to demand divestment from military assets supplied to Israel, coinciding with a Board of Governors meeting. Despite protests and an open letter, the Board did not discuss divestment. On May 30, SFU president Joy Johnson and the Board of Governors agreed to discuss divestment from arms companies after community pressure, protests, and a faculty vote. They committed to reviewing their Responsible Investment Policy with community input.

On June 3, protesters occupied a Concordia University building for around an hour. On June 5, an encampment was set up at York University, which was subsequently cleared by Toronto police on June 6.

On June 7, University of Waterloo agreed to several demands to disclose investments and to base investment decisions on human rights and other social factors.

On June 10, a protest was held at Brock University.

On October 7, 2024, walkouts were held on all three of the University of Toronto's campuses in downtown Toronto (St. George), Mississauga, and Scarborough.

=== Cuba ===
On 23 November 2023, thousands marched in the Paseo del Prado of Havana in solidarity with the Palestinian cause, including President Miguel Díaz-Canel, who wore a keffiyeh to the event, Prime Minister Manuel Marrero, Foreign Minister Bruno Rodríguez Parrilla, and several Palestinian medical students who were in Cuba as part of a cooperation program. Prior to the demonstration, the colors of the Palestinian flag were projected on to the José Martí Memorial.

On 14 October 2024, President Diaz-Canel organized a protest in Havana in solidarity with Palestine.

On 9 October 2025, thousands of people gathered in front of the U.S. embassy to protest against the Gaza war and to show support to the Palestinians. The demonstration was organized by President Diaz-Canel and the government.

=== Dominican Republic ===
On 19 October 2023, about a hundred people gathered at Parque Independencia in Santo Domingo to protest against Israel's actions towards the Palestinians and express solidarity with Palestine.

=== Jamaica ===
In May 2024, several protesters held a march in Half Way Tree, Saint Andrew Parish in support of Palestine and demanding the Jamaican government to cut diplomatic ties with Israel.

=== Mexico ===
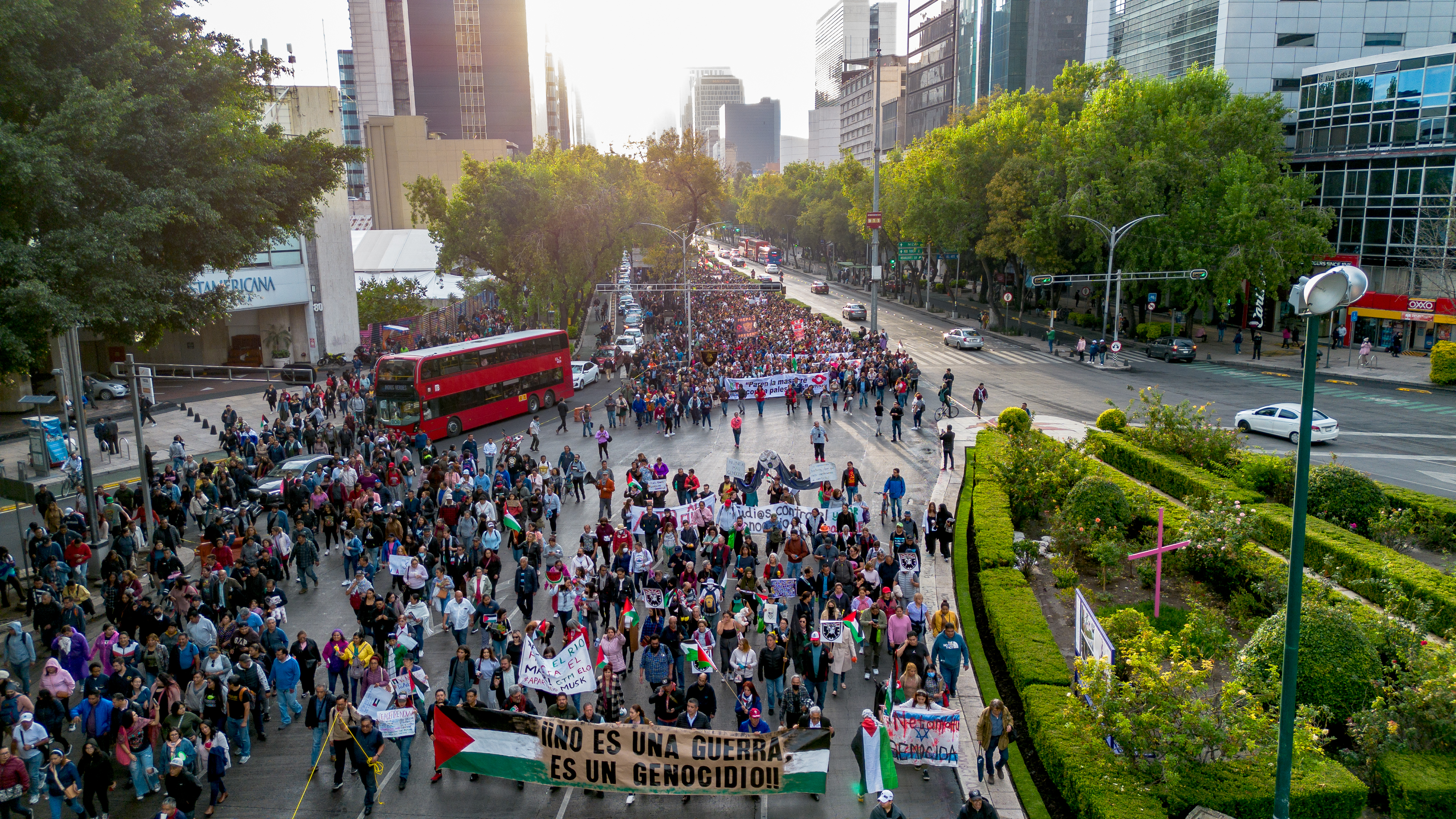
Pro-Palestinian protest in Mexico City, 29 November 2023

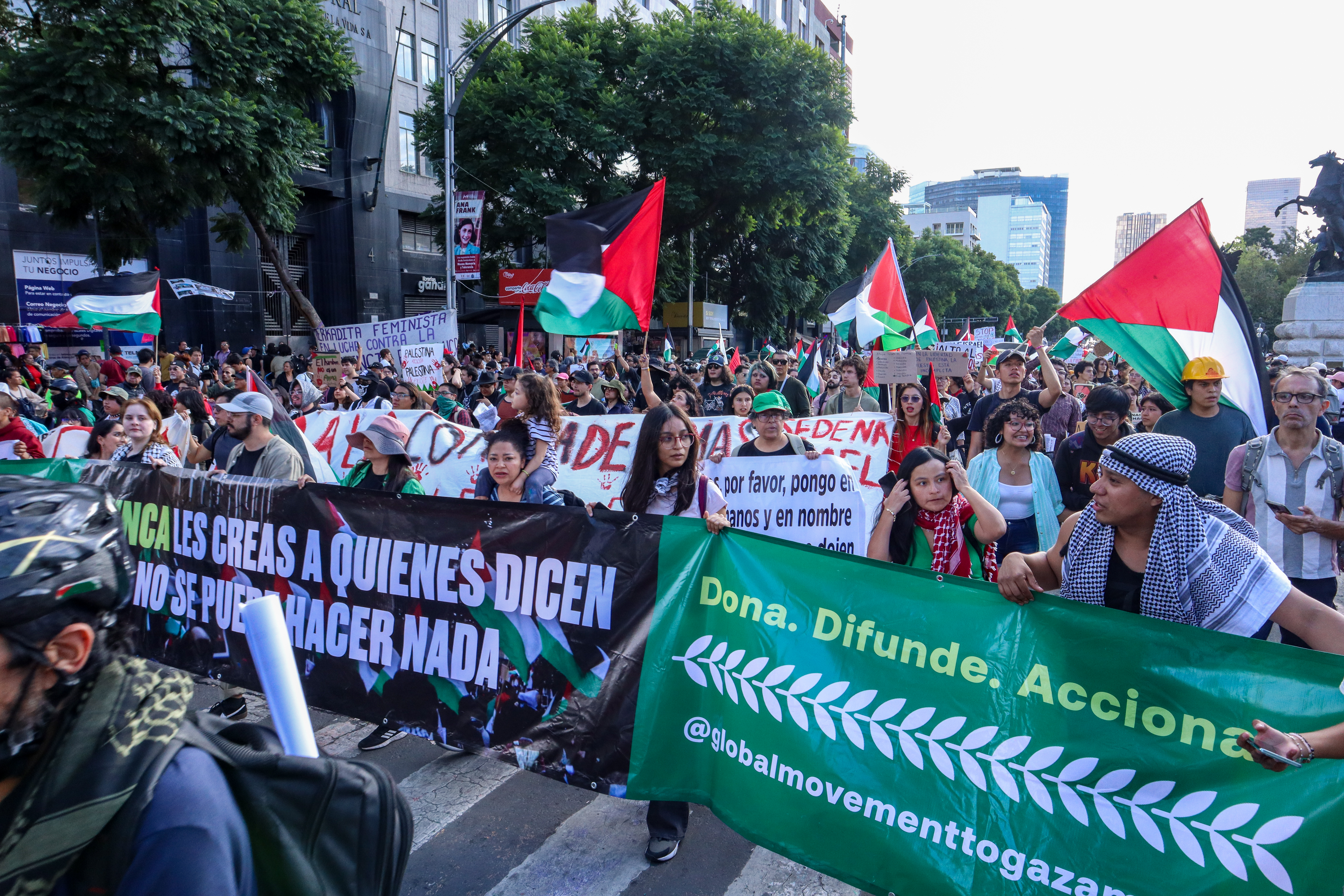
Pro-Palestinian protest in Mexico City, 17 August 2025

Over 3,000 rallied in solidarity with Israel in Mexico City on 15 October.

Palestine supporters gathered at the Israeli embassy in Mexico City. On 5 November, thousands marched in Mexico City from the Angel of Independence monument to the Zócalo, chanting, "break, break ties with Israel" and "it is not a war, it is a genocide". Anti-war protesters hit piñatas with the faces of Joe Biden and Netanyahu at a protest on 8 January in Mexico City.

On 13 January 2024, as a part of the "global day of action", thousands took to the streets of Mexico City in solidarity with Palestine. On 18 February, hundreds of pro-Palestinian protesters took to Mexico City's Paseo de la Reforma demanding a ceasefire. On 28 May 2024, following the Tel al-Sultan massacre, an estimated 200 people rallied in the Lomas de Chapultepec neighborhood of Mexico City. Protests were held in front of the Israeli embassy and culminated in clashes with the police. On 29 May, protestors denouncing the Rafah offensive threw molotov cocktails into the embassy, causing minor damage. That same month, a solidarity encampment was set up at the National Autonomous University of Mexico by students demanding the breaking of diplomatic relations with Israel.

On 6 October 2024, demonstrations broke out in Mexico City, marching on the streets with Palestinian flags and banners urging President Claudia Sheinbaum to break off ties with Israel.

=== Trinidad and Tobago ===
On 14 October 2023, about 300 members of the Muslim community gathered at Queen's Park Savannah in Port of Spain to show solidarity with the Palestinians.

=== United States ===
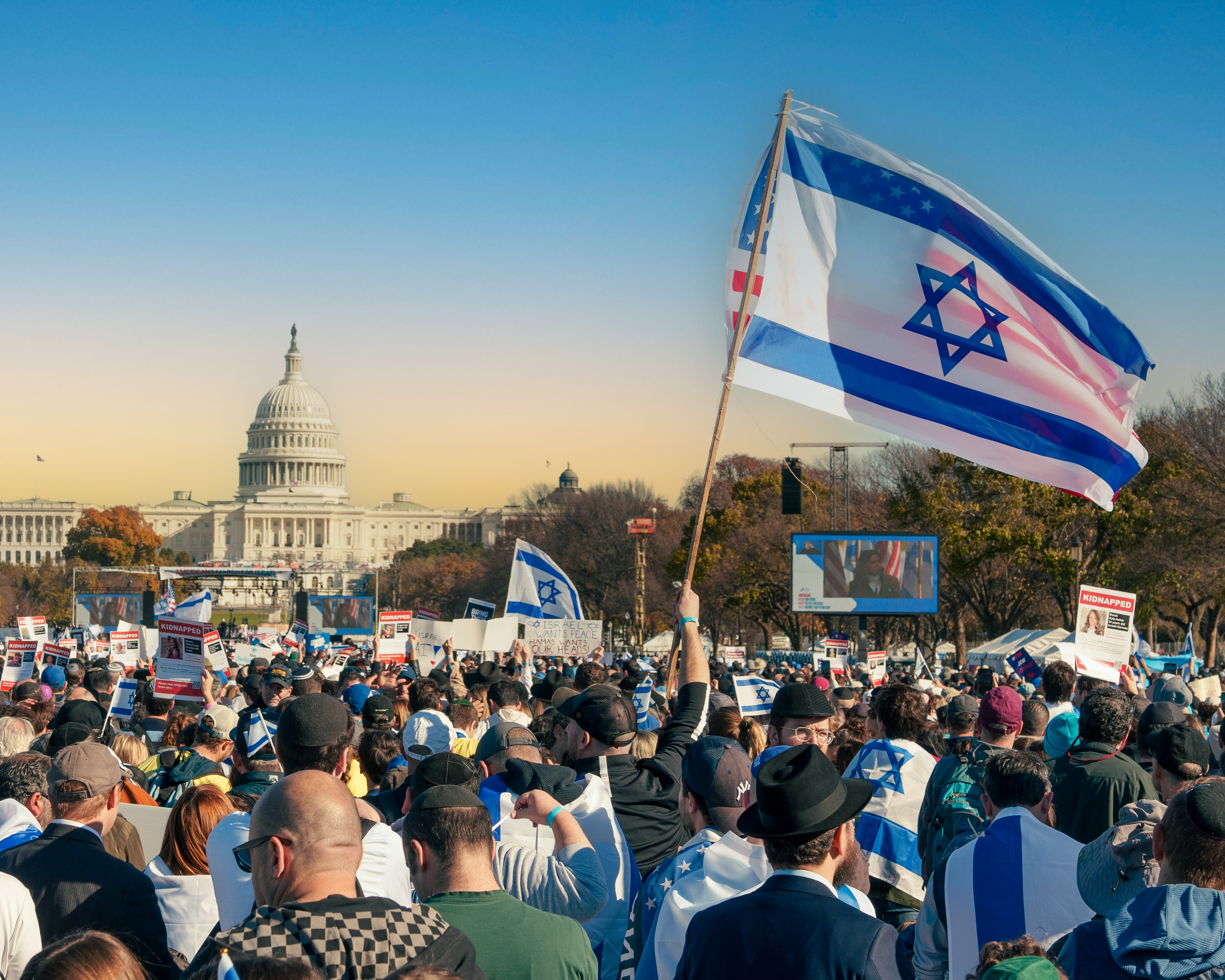
14 November, 2023 rally in support of Israel in Washington, D.C.

On 8 October 2023, one day after Hamas' attack on Israel, hundreds of pro-Palestinian demonstrators rallied in New York City's Times Square, waving Palestinian flags, chanting "Resistance is Justified", "Globalize the Intifada", "From the river to the sea, Palestine will be free", "By any means necessary", "Glory to our martyrs", and "Smash the settler Zionist state". Dozens of pro-Israeli protesters also organised a counter-protest, singing Hatikvah and chanting "Never again" and "The people of Israel live" in Hebrew.

In the ten days after the attack, the US held more than 400 related protests and vigils. There were an estimated 180,000 demonstrators and protestors, with roughly even numbers attending events related to Israeli and Palestinian concerns. US elected officials overwhelmingly attended more events in support of Israel. An estimated one-third of all anti-war protests were met with counter-protesters, who at times were violent. By the second week of the war, the number of pro-Palestinian protests in the US outnumbered the number of Pro-Israel protests.

Students in the United States reported fears of losing future job opportunities for engaging in protests against military action in Gaza. More than 260 "incidents of suppression" were reported against people opposed to the war. Palestine Legal, a non-profit representing people who lost their jobs for protesting for Palestinian rights, described the environment in the United States as "McCarthyite". The Israel on Campus Coalition reportedly engaged in covert espionage against pro-Palestinian student organizations. Accuracy in Media sent doxxing trucks to college campuses around the United States, displaying the names and faces of people it perceives to be pro-Palestinian. Canary Mission produced blacklists of students involved with pro-Palestinian activism. The ACLU urged US colleges to protect the free speech of pro-Palestinian and anti-war protestors. The National Lawyers Guild condemned all attacks on pro-Palestinian activism at universities.

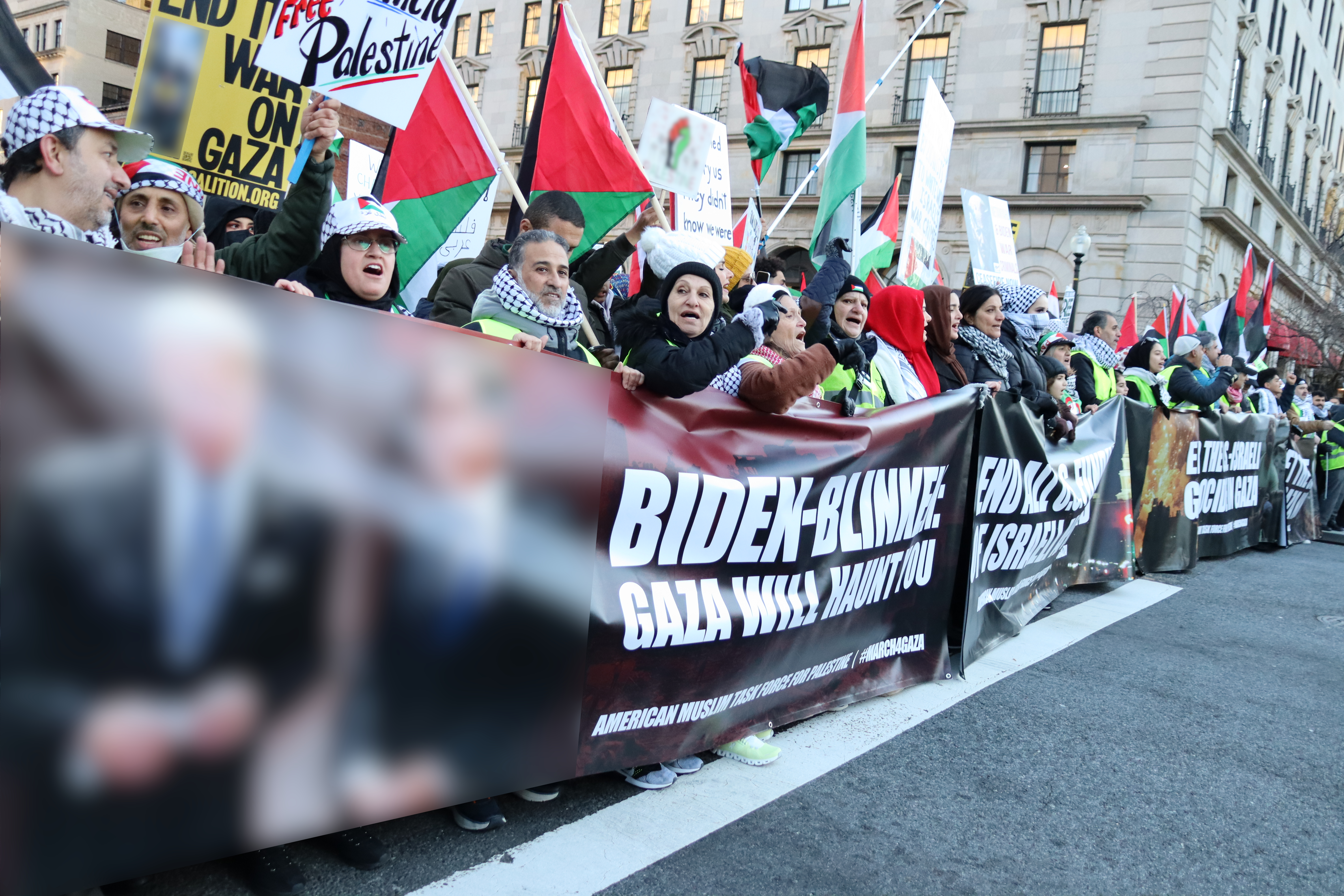
March on Washington for Gaza in January 2024

Congressional staff for Democrat representatives reported receiving an overwhelming amount of calls and emails from constituents demanding their representatives to support a ceasefire. One staffer noted: "The phone doesn't stop ringing at any point in the day." On 4 November 2023, the National March on Washington: Free Palestine was held at the National Mall. At least two Americans — a woman in Atlanta and Aaron Bushnell in Washington, D.C. — self-immolated in protest of U.S. policy in Gaza, the latter of whom later died. The identity of the woman who self-immolated was not publicly released, but she was reported to be in critical condition as of 2 December 2023. Police described it as an "act of extreme political protest", assuring the public that there was no terrorist threat to the Israeli consulate. Israeli consul general Anat Sultan-Dadon said it was "tragic to see the hate and incitement toward Israel expressed in such a horrific way." Bushnell, an active duty member of the United States Air Force, shouted "Free Palestine" as he burned. He was taken to a hospital where he later died. Tax Day protests were held in several major cities on 15 April 2024.

==== Puerto Rico ====
Hundreds of Puerto Ricans held pro-Palestinian demonstrations in San Juan denouncing Israel in October and November 2023. When US vice president Kamala Harris visited the island on 22 March 2024, several dozen people from Puerto Rican independence groups organised a pro-Palestinian protest criticising Israel and the United States. Many Puerto Rican activists see similarities between Palestinians and themselves relating to struggles against perceived colonialism.

==== US Virgin Islands ====
On 4 November 2023, members from the Arab community of Saint Croix as well as some black, white and Hispanic supporters showed solidarity with Palestine.

== Oceania ==
=== Australia ===
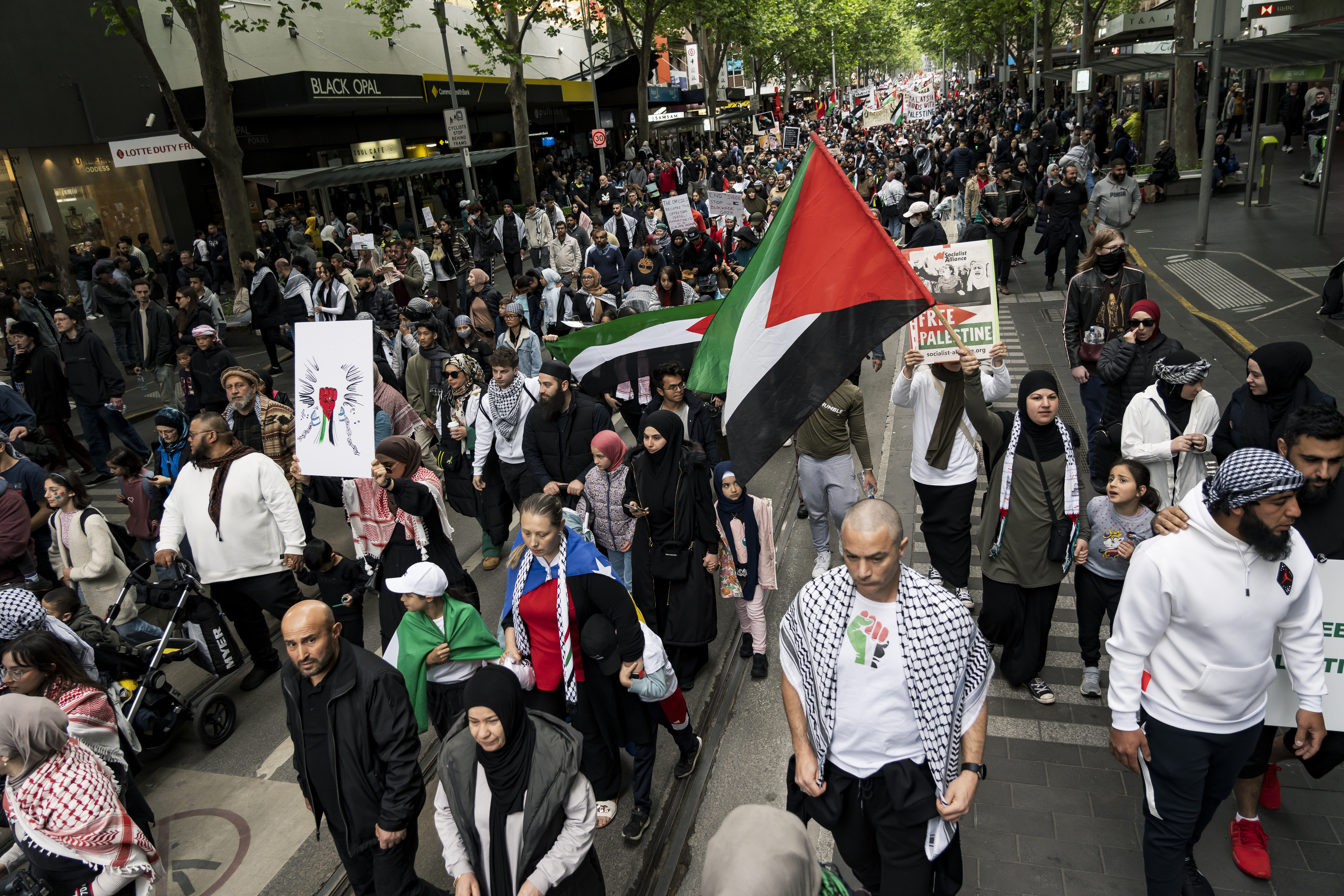
Protest opposing the bombing of Gaza, Melbourne, Australia, 15 October

Following the outbreak of the Gaza war in October 2023, pro-Palestinian protests were held in several Australian cities including Sydney, Melbourne, Adelaide, Brisbane and Perth. Protests at the Sydney Opera House and Lakemba were criticised by New South Wales Premier Chris Minns and Australian Prime Minister Anthony Albanese for alleged antisemitic rhetoric and violence.

Notable pro-Palestinian protests and campaigns have included weekly marches in Melbourne, Jewish peace activists occupying the electorate office of Defence Minister Richard Marles, blockades at the Port of Melbourne and Port Botany, the establishment of protest encampments at several Australian universities, and the Melbourne Land Forces Expo protests. Other notable protest actions have included picketing a Melbourne hotel hosting a delegation of Israeli kidnapping and murder victims and Qantas flight crew donning Palestinian flag badges.

Pro-Israel counter-protests have also been held in Sydney and Melbourne.

=== Cook Islands ===
On 8 November, a small group of protesters gathered outside the National Auditorium in Avarua during the 2023 Pacific Islands Forum meeting calling for an end to the killing of Palestinian children in Gaza.

=== Fiji ===
On 2 June 2026, nearly a hundred people staged a pro-Palestinian demonstration at the Fiji Women's Crisis Centre in Suva to protest against the opening of the Israeli embassy at the Fijian Holdings Limited Tower. The protest was staged by members of the Non-Government Organisation Coalition for Human Rights and Fijians for Palestine. Israel's Foreign Minister Gideon Sa'ar criticized the protest, stating that the demonstration was part of an agenda to "destroy the Jewish state".

=== New Zealand ===
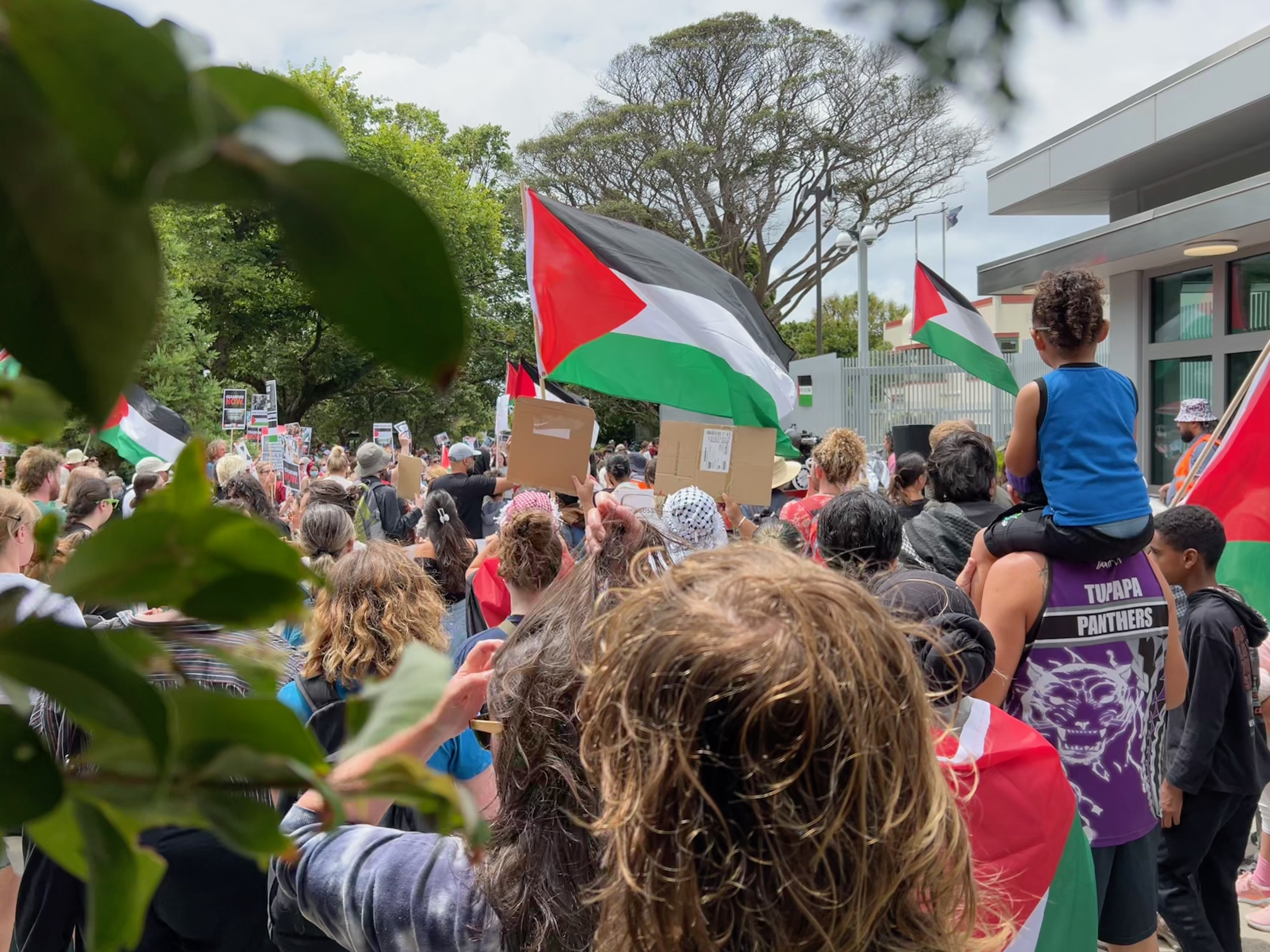
Palestine protest march from the US Embassy, Wellington in 2024

Since the outbreak of the Gaza war on 7 October 2023, both pro-Palestinian and pro-Israel protest events have been held across several New Zealand centres including Auckland, Wellington, Christchurch, Palmerston North, Nelson and Dunedin. Pro-Palestinian protesters including the Palestine Solidarity Network Aotearoa New Zealand's leader John Minto have called for a ceasefire in Gaza and the suspension of diplomatic, economic and institutional relations and linkages between New Zealand and Israel. Notable protest campaigns have included an attempted blockade of the Ports of Auckland, protest events at several university campuses in mid-2024 and a controversial hotline targeting Israeli visitors of military age in January 2025.

Pro-Israel figures such as Destiny Church leader Brian Tamaki have organised pro-Israel counter-protests have been held across New Zealand. These have sought to express support for Israeli actions and to counter alleged antisemitism.

=== Samoa ===
In December 2023, a pro-Palestine group called Samoans for Ceasefire peacefully marched along Beach Road in the capital Apia, to rally for actions from the government to support and commit their efforts in calling for a ceasefire in Gaza. Later, in January 2024, a pro-Israel protest was orgasnised by the Samoa Prayer for Israel.

== South America ==
=== Argentina ===
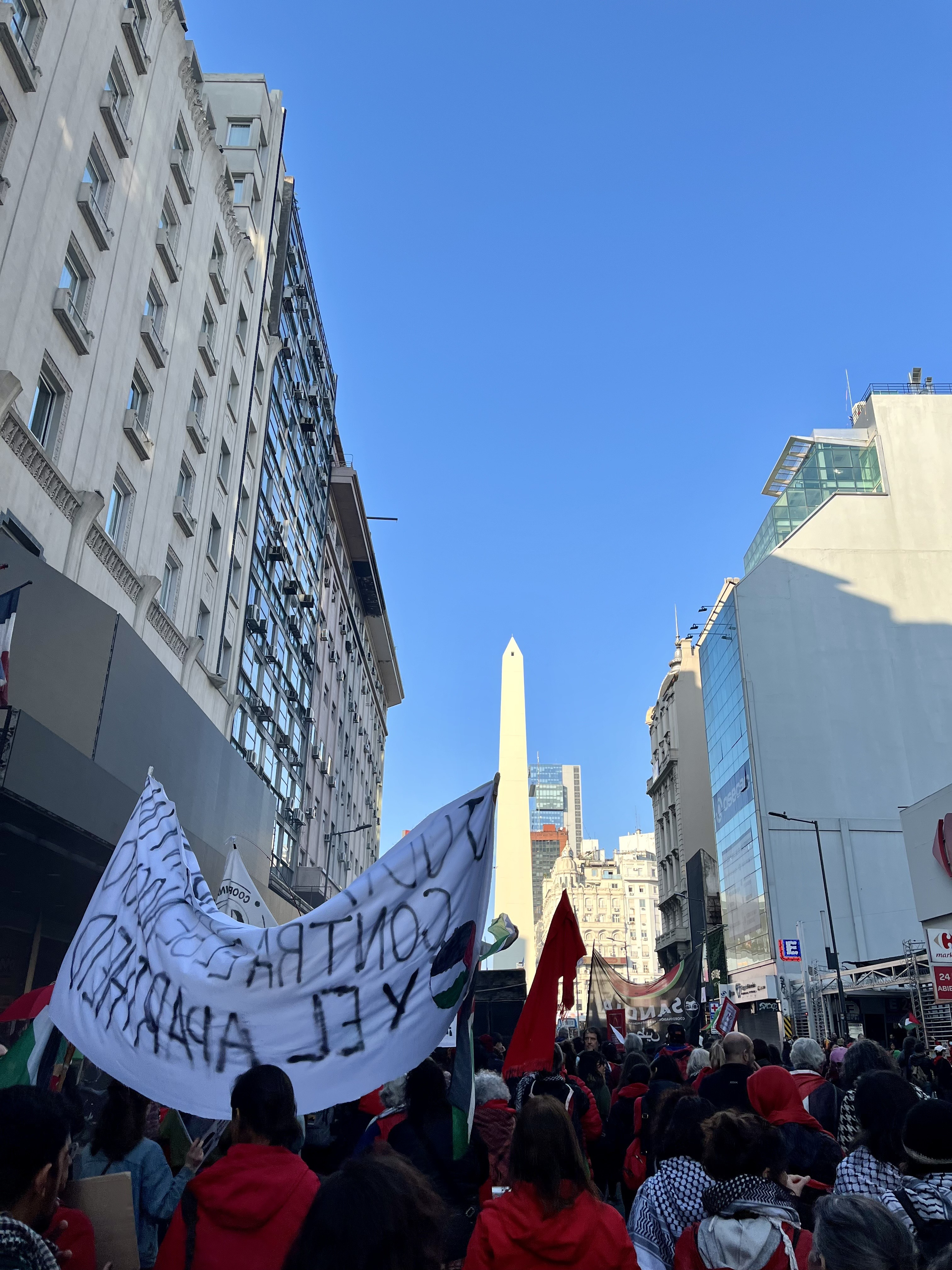
A pro-Palestine march in Buenos Aires, 12 July 2025.

A pro-Israel rally was held in Buenos Aires on 9 October that was attended by mayor Horacio Rodríguez Larreta and presidential candidate Patricia Bullrich. On 7 October 2024, thousands attended a rally in Buenos Aires, backed by President Javier Milei, to mark the first anniversary of Hamas' attack on Israel.

In September 2024, hundreds of Argentinians, including members from Arab and Palestinian communities, participated in a pro-Palestine rally in Buenos Aires, calling for the end of Israel's operations in Gaza. On 15 June 2025, thousands marched in Buenos Aires in support of the Global March to Gaza. On 12 July 2025, another pro-Palestine march took part in Buenos Aires and other parts of the country, known as the "red tide" because its protesters wore red garments and elements.

=== Brazil ===
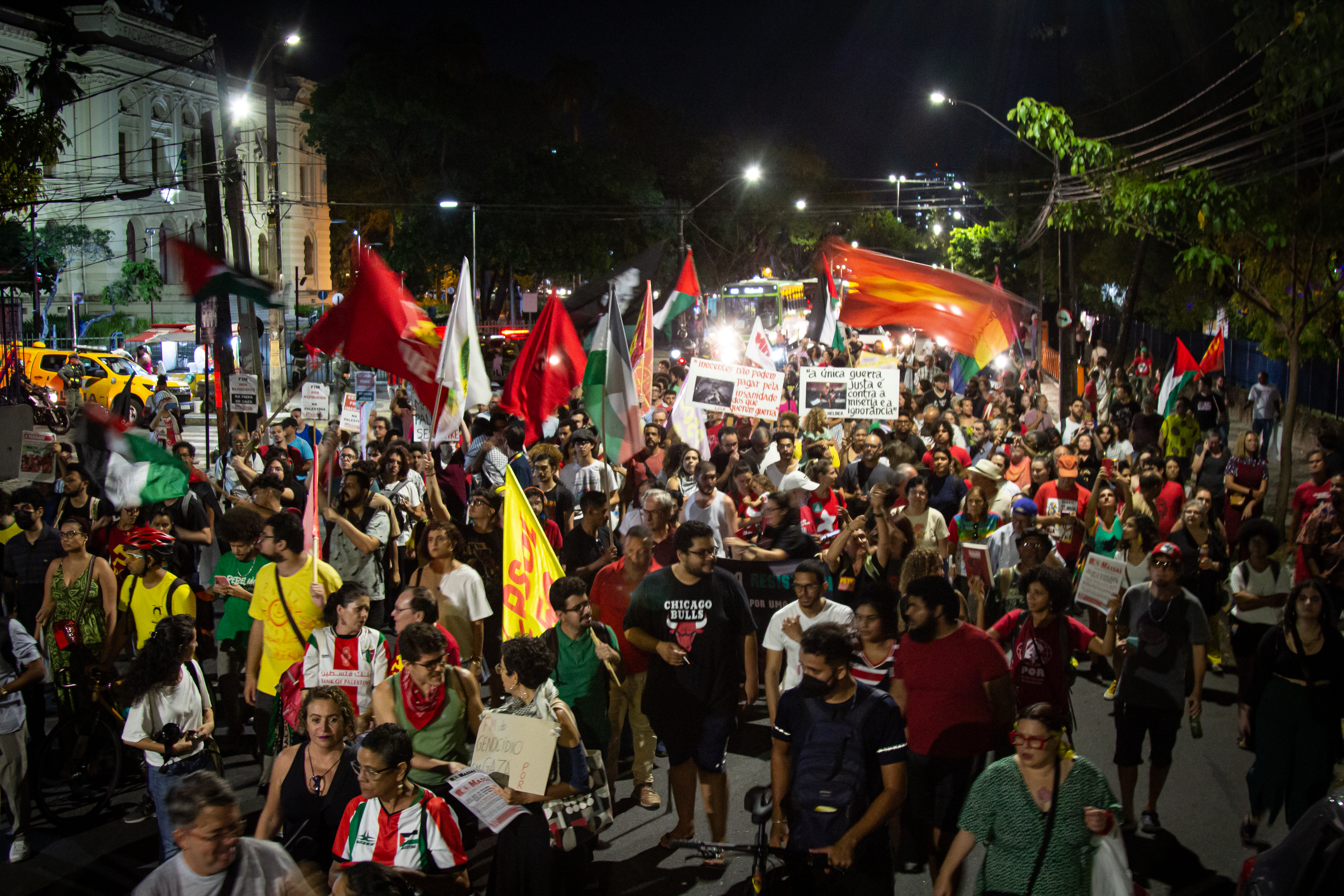
Protest against the war in Gaza, Recife, Brazil, 19 October 2023

On 10 October, members of the Palestinian community protested outside the National Museum in Brasília. On 15 October, members of the Israeli community rallied in Copacabana, Rio de Janeiro. On 13 January 2024, a pro-Palestine march was held in São Paulo calling for a ceasefire as part of the "Global day of action".

In February 2024, thousands gathered for a pro-Israel rally held by former president Jair Bolsonaro to protest against President Lula da Silva's remarks comparing Gaza to the Holocaust.

=== Chile ===
A benefit concert was held at Padre Hurtado Park in Santiago on 25 October to raise funds for hospitals in the Palestinian territories and express solidarity with civilians in Gaza. Among the performers was Latin Grammy winner Ana Tijoux.

On 15 February 2024, protests were held in Providencia, Santiago province, demanding an end to Israeli aggression on Gaza and the severing of relations with Israel. In March 2024, protesters called on president Gabriel Boric to expel the Israeli Ambassador from Chile.

=== Colombia ===
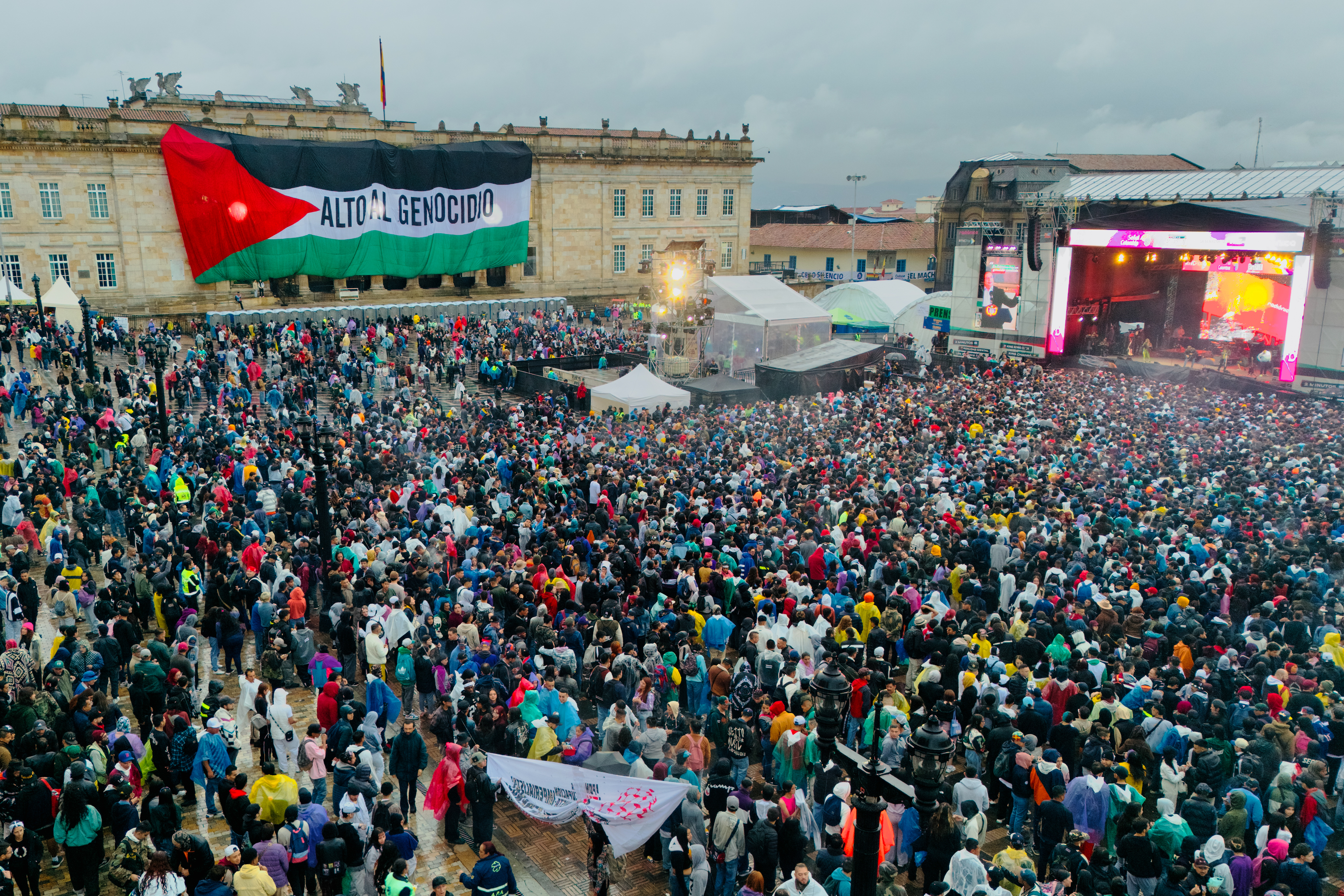
Pro-Palestinian protest in Plaza de Bolívar, Bogotá, Colombia, 5 July 2024

A protest was staged at the Israeli embassy in Bogotá in support of Palestine, during which protesters burned the Israeli flag.

=== Guyana ===
On 21 October 2023, hundreds of Guyanese marched through Georgetown to protest Israel's war on Gaza and chanted "From the river to the sea, Palestine will be free... Free Palestine! Free Palestine!" In May 2024, a pro-Palestine rally was held at the Square of the Revolution in Georgetown, denouncing Israel's violence towards Palestinians.

=== Suriname ===
In November 2023, hundreds of protesters, including Muslims and Jews, peacefully marched through Paramaribo to protest Israel's actions in Gaza.

=== Uruguay ===
On 10 October, around a thousand people demonstrated in support of Israel in Punta del Este. It was attended by the Intendant of Maldonado Department Enrique Antía and representatives of other religions. Additionally, La Mano was lit up in the colors of the Israeli flag. On the night of 11 October, a demonstration was held in Montevideo in support of Israel, which brought together around 3,000 people on the Rambla in the Pocitos neighborhood. The rally, which was called by different organizations of the Jewish community of Uruguay "against terrorism" was attended by a number of government officials, including Vice President Beatriz Argimón.

=== Venezuela ===
In Caracas, protestors rallied to show solidarity with Palestine.

== Worldwide ==
=== Advocacy groups ===
On 13 November 2023, 30 organizations, including Amnesty International, the Evangelical Lutheran Church, and Oxfam, signed an open letter to the Biden administration, urging them not to transfer 155mm artillery shells to Israel.

On 2 February 2024, more than 800 serving officials from the United States and Europe released the "trans-Atlantic statement" opposing their governments' support of Israel's war in Gaza, saying the US and EU risked contributing "to grave violations of international law, war crimes and even ethnic cleansing or genocide".

==== Amnesty International ====
Amnesty International condemned European authorities for enforcing limitations on protests, contending that these actions infringe upon freedom of speech. It stated that nonviolent demonstrations against Israel should not be treated as a matter of security, adding that prohibiting pro-Palestinian protests, intimidating or arresting individuals who voice their opinions on the issue, and threatening to expel foreign nationals involved in such actions violate human rights.

=== Artists ===
Artists around the world expressed vocal support for Israel and Palestine.

==== Pro-Palestine and anti-war ====
On 21 October, a group of celebrities wrote an open letter to US President Biden calling for an immediate ceasefire. Actors expressing support for Palestine faced repercussions for perceived antisemitism, including Melissa Barrera and Susan Sarandon. Barrera had compared Gaza to a concentration camp, while Sarandon had remarked at a rally: "There are a lot of people afraid of being Jewish at this time, and are getting a taste of what it feels like to be a Muslim in this country." She later apologized, calling her phrasing "a terrible mistake". Artists across Europe faced repercussions for statements in solidarity with Palestinians. Painter Ai Weiwei's exhibition at the Lisson Gallery was postponed indefinitely after he tweeted about the conflict that "the sense of guilt around the persecution of the Jewish people has been, at times, transferred to offset the Arab world. Financially, culturally, and in terms of media influence, the Jewish community has had a significant presence in the United States". Gallerists reported collectors were requesting artists critical of Israel be removed from shows. Adam Broomberg, a Jewish artist from South Africa, faced cancellations and accusations of antisemitism for his support of Palestine. British musician Roger Waters was reportedly dropped by BMG Rights Management for his anti-Israel statements.

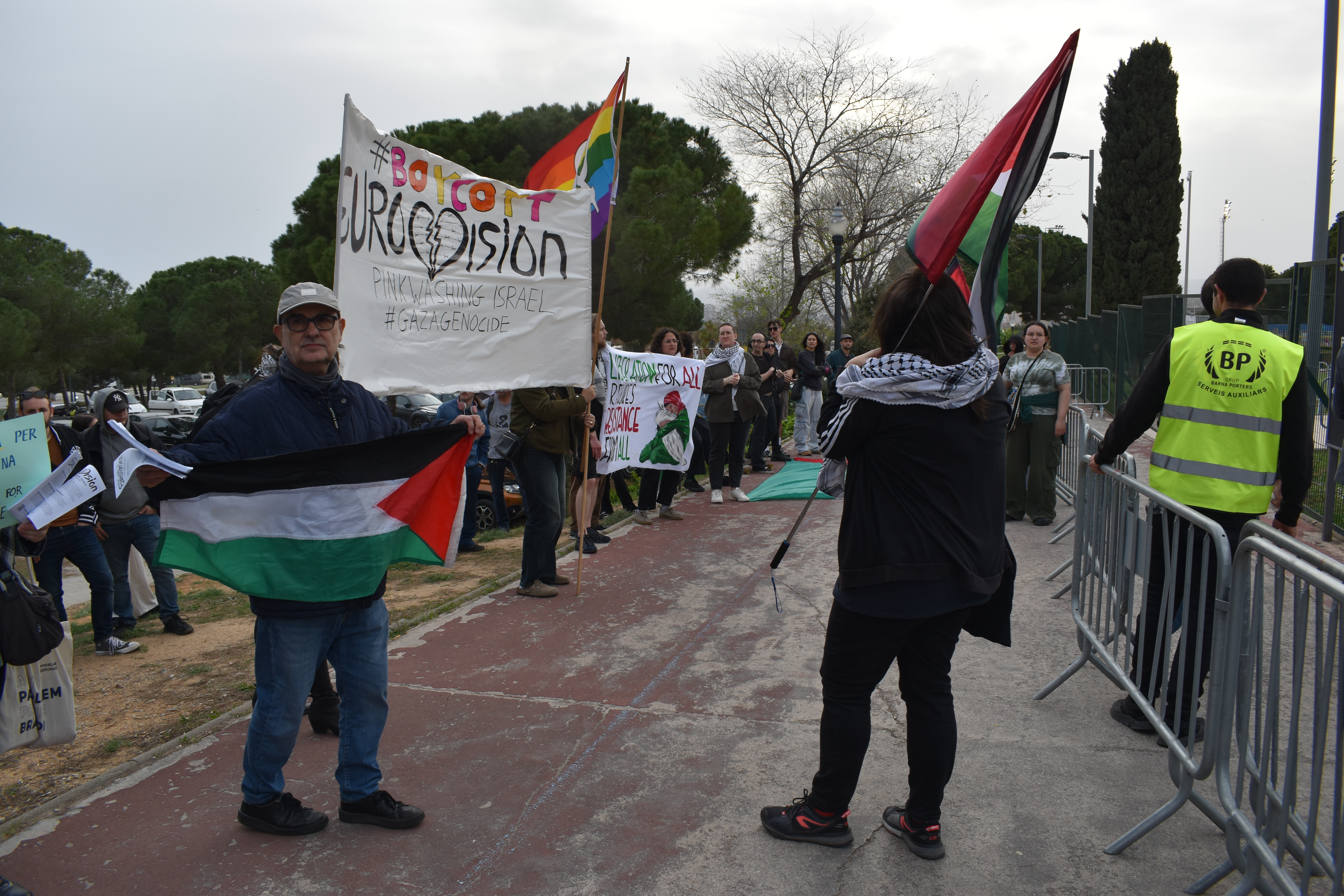
A demonstration against Israeli Eurovision participation in Barcelona, April 2024

In an interview with Democracy Now!, author Ta-Nehisi Coates stated "the most shocking thing" about the conflict was that it was not complicated, comparing his experience as an African American to that of the Palestinians. An open-letter by 350 authors accused the Frankfurt Book Fair of "shutting down" Palestinian voices after it postponed the awarding of its annual prize to Palestinian author Adania Shibli. The photographer Nan Goldin cancelled a project with the New York Times due to its complicity with Israel. Tunisian actress Hend Sabri stepped down as a World Food Programme Goodwill ambassador over Israel's food blockade in the Gaza Strip. Angelina Jolie condemned Israel's actions in Gaza. Lawrence Abu Hamdan, Catherine David, and Judith Butler signed an open-letter to start an artistic and academic boycott of German institutions. Ken Loach carried a sign reading "Gaza – Stop the massacre" at the BAFTAS.

A group of 1,300 artists, including actors Olivia Colman, Harriet Walter, and Juliet Stevenson called for a ceasefire and condemned western cultural institutions for "repressing, silencing and stigmatising Palestinian voices and perspectives". American director Michael Moore vocally advocated against the "slaughter in Gaza". On 13 December, the Icelandic Society of Authors and Composers urged RÚV to withdraw from the Eurovision Song Contest 2024 unless Israel was barred from participating. More than 1000 artists vowed to cease working with the British gallery Arnolfini following its decision to cancel two Palestinian film events. On 13 December, the Heinrich Böll Foundation withdrew from the Hannah Arendt Prize ceremony for Masha Gessen, due to their The New Yorker article comparing Gazans to ghettoized European Jews. Olly Alexander faced controversy when he signed a petition criticizing Israeli apartheid and the Palestinian genocide.

During an acceptance speech, novelist Arundhati Roy said: "If we say nothing about Israel's brazen slaughter of Palestinians, even as it is livestreamed into the most private recesses of our personal lives, we are complicit in it." Artists in France, Italy, Mexico, South Africa, Germany, the United States, Belgium, and Britain, including Caryl Churchill and Dominic Cooke, protested in support of the arrested artists of The Freedom Theatre in the West Bank. Palestinian sculptor Sana Farah Bishara sculpted a bronze statue of the infant Jesus in an incubator for the Church of the Nativity in Bethlehem. American singers Taylor Swift and Selena Gomez attended Ramy Youssef's fundraiser for Gaza.

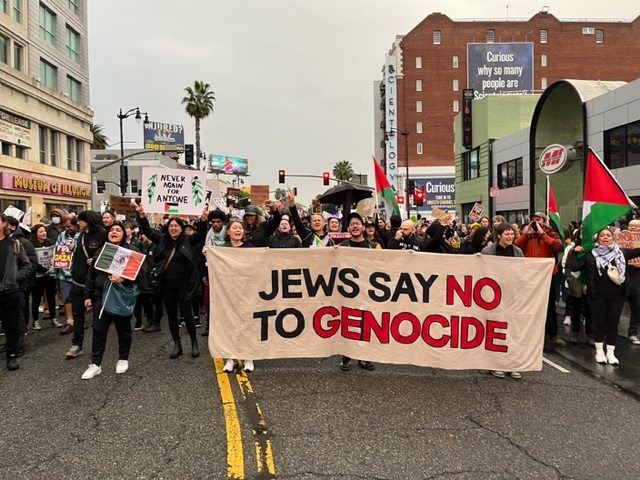
Pro-Palestinian protest on Hollywood Boulevard in Los Angeles against the genocide and Hollywood's role in dehumanizing Muslims, 15 November 2023

On 10 January 2024, ARTnews reported the Eskenazi Museum of Art at Indiana University had cancelled its career retrospective of Palestinian painter Samia Halaby due to "safety concerns", to which she responded: "I am not a stranger to racism and sexism of the art world." The 92nd Street Y cancelled a talk by Viet Thanh Nguyen, who had previously condemned Israeli violence against Gazans. 1,400 Finnish artists and musicians called for Israel to be barred from performing in the 2024 Eurovision contest. According to The Jewish Chronicle, the band Coldplay posted the music video "Freedom for Palestine" to their official Facebook page. A group of actors, including Game of Thrones stars Lena Heady and Charles Dance, read out South Africa's ICJ lawsuit to bring awareness to the plight of Palestinians.

On 15 January 2024, Bosnian author Lana Bastašić stated she was severing ties with German publishing house S. Fischer Verlag due to its failure to speak out against the "genocide" in Gaza. Audience members reportedly walked out of American comedian Dave Chappelle's show after he criticized U.S. support for Israeli war crimes. American comedian Dauood Naimyar had shows cancelled for his pro-Palestinian social media posts. Emily Jacir, a Palestinian-American filmmaker, criticized the "harassment, baseless smear campaigns, [and] cancelling shows" of Palestinian artists. Randa Jarrar, a Palestinian-American writer, was physically removed from a PEN America event in Los Angeles for disrupting the event; five other people who were also protesting against the speaker, Mayim Bialik, were not removed.

Welsh singer Charlotte Church led a choir in singing a rendition of a pro-Palestinian song titled "From the River to the Sea". Several filmmakers at the Berlin International Film Festival criticized the war, including American director Ben Russell and Palestinian journalist Basel Adra. More than 4,000 artists signed a petition calling for Israel to be excluded from the Venice Biennale. American actress Hunter Schafer was arrested in New York protesting against Biden and his response to the war. Zukiswa Wanner and Mohamed Abla returned their Goethe Medals in protest of Germany's support of Israel. During the 2024 Oscars on 11 March, director Jonathan Glazer condemned the "hijacking" of Judaism and the Holocaust in support of Israel's occupation of the Palestinian Territories. Editors at Guernica magazine resigned en masse following the publication of an article termed "apologia for Zionism and the ongoing genocide in Palestine". At least 80 scheduled performers at the SXSW festival pulled out in protest of sponsors' ties to the war. Rio Cinema, the venue of London's largest screening of Eurovision, cancelled its 2024 event, stating that it had decided against screening the program's grand final "while Israel remains in the competition". In May 2024, Dave Chappelle stated Gaza was facing a genocide. In October 2024, 1,000 writers and literary professionals pledged a cultural boycott of Israel.

In May 2025, more than 300 British artists, doctors, activists and academics including Benedict Cumberbatch, Dua Lipa, Gary Lineker, Danny Boyle, and Brian Cox signed an open letter to Prime Minister Keir Starmer to suspend arms sales to Israel and to broker a permanent ceasefire. In that same month, more than 400 writers including Jeanette Winterson, Irvine Welsh, Kate Mosse, and Zadie Smith signed a letter calling for an immediate ceasefire and denounced Israel's actions in Gaza.

==== Pro-Israel ====
American celebrities, including Amy Schumer, Mayim Bialik, Sarah Silverman, and Noah Schnapp faced controversy from their fan bases for their support for Israel. A group of 700 celebrities condemned Hamas. American actress Jamie Lee Curtis and Canadian musician Justin Bieber faced controversy for supporting Israel using images from the Gaza Strip, and then deleting the posts after finding out the pictures showed Palestinians. American film director Quentin Tarantino made a trip in mid-October to "boost IDF morale" in southern Israel. Several hundred Hollywood figures including Jordan Peele, Chris Rock, Taika Waititi, James Corden, Matthew Weiner, Aaron Sorkin, Judd Apatow, Eugene Levy, Jon Hamm, Will Ferrell, Jeff Goldblum, Bob Odenkirk and Tiffany Haddish urged the release of Israeli hostages and supported US President Biden's stance in the war on 23 October. American actor Timothee Chalamet faced backlash for an SNL skit, with fans stating he was "mocking genocide". American singer Beyoncé was criticized for screening her 2023 concert film Renaissance in Israel during the war. British comedian Stephen Fry was accused of "drawing more attention to himself" than the conflict during a holiday special. In mid-December 2023, American comedian Jerry Seinfeld traveled to Israel to "show solidarity" with Israelis.

American comedian Chelsea Handler faced criticism for posting a pro-Israel TikTok that was described as "propaganda". American actress Selma Blair was forced to apologize after calling pro-Palestinian activists "terrorist supporting goons" and advocating for their deportation. Four hundred celebrities, including British actress Helen Mirren, British singer Boy George, American producer Scooter Braun, and American actresses Julianna Margulies and Emmy Rossum signed a letter supporting Israel's participation in the 2024 Eurovision competition. In February 2024, American Kid Rock advocated killing "30,000 to 40,000" Palestinian civilians at a time until Israeli hostages were returned. Nick Cave and Thom Yorke were criticized in an Al Jazeera English editorial by Andrew Mitrovica for their decision to continue playing concerts in Israel. In October 2024, over 1,000 figures from the literary and entertainment industries signed a letter denouncing attempts to "boycott, harass and scapegoat Jewish and Israeli authors and literary institutions."

=== Sports ===
Sports stars and fans protested the conflict. The Green Brigade pledged to continue supporting Palestine despite backlash from the Celtic F.C. board. Youcef Atal and Anwar El Ghazi were both suspended for supporting Palestine. French Interior Minister Gérald Darmanin accused Karim Benzema of being connected to the Muslim Brotherhood for his support of Palestine. Ons Jabeur donated part of her WTA Finals prize money to the Palestinian people.

In Australia, Usman Khawaja faced a ban from cricket if he had played with the messages "all lives are equal" and "freedom is a human right" in the colors of the Palestinian flag on his shoes; under cricket bylaws, "messages which relate to political, religious or racial activities or causes" are not permitted. In the United States, the Minnesota Vikings and other NFL teams wore shoes that stated "I stand with Israel". Attendees at the 2023 AFC Asian Cup chanted "Free Palestine" during the UAE-Palestine game on 18 January.

More than 300 Palestinian sports leagues called for Israel to be barred from the 2024 Olympics after it killed Palestine's Olympic football team coach and destroyed the headquarters of the Palestine Olympic Committee. Gary Lineker, a British sports commentator, shared then deleted a post calling for an international ban on Israeli sports competition. Attendees at the 2024 NBA All-Star Game held banners reading "Let Gaza Live" and "Ceasefire Now". Russian UFC fighter Umar Nurmagomedov dedicated his victory speech to the people in Gaza, stating "they don't have any food, they don't have any water, medical, nothing" and called on the world to "wake up". In March 2024, the Palestinian Football Association called on FIFA to issue sanctions against Israel, stating Israel had killed "no less than 99 footballers" in Gaza.

=== Boycotts ===
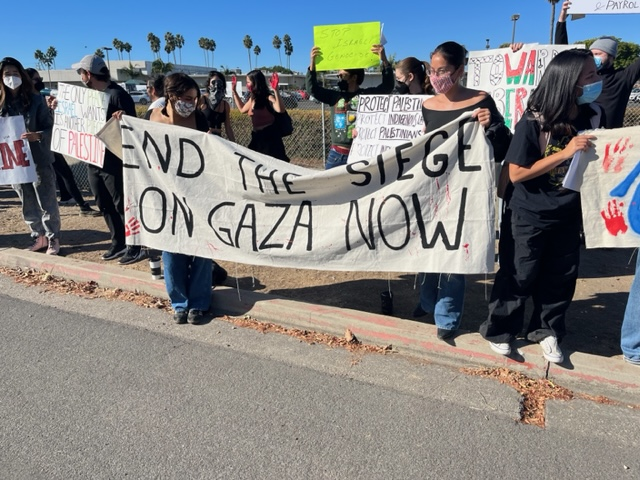
Demonstration outside Raytheon's office in Goleta, California to protest the military contractor's supply of weapons to Israel, 9 November 2023

In response to the conflict, young activists on social media began widespread boycotts against companies perceived to be supporting the Israeli military during the conflict. The three primary targets were McDonald's, Starbucks and Disney+, with the hashtag #boycottstarbucks gaining 29 million views on TikTok by 3 November. McDonald's was targeted after offering free food for the IDF. Starbucks was boycotted after it sued the Starbucks Union for a social media post supporting the people of Gaza. Zara faced boycotts after its marketing campaign featured rubble and body bags. Protesters targeted Zara stores in Germany, Australia, Portugal, the Netherlands, Tunisia, Turkey and Scotland.

On 7 November, the Grand National Assembly of Turkey announced a boycott of companies supporting Israel, barring their products from being sold in the legislature's restaurants, cafeterias, or teahouses. In Egypt, a nationwide "boycott Israel" movement resulted in the revival of local brands and products. In Malaysia, the licensee of McDonald's sued the BDS movement for their social media posts linking the chain to Israel's "genocidal war against Palestinians in Gaza". BDS activists in France targeted Carrefour supermarkets with protests for their ties to Israeli settler companies. A large banner hung in the center of Madrid calling for a boycott of McDonald's in February 2024. Turkish-founded water company Sirma faced boycott calls after a video showing a group of Israeli soldiers drinking their product in Gaza went viral on X. In Turkey, boycott campaigns have targeted Starbucks, McDonald's, Burger King, Coca-Cola and Carrefour. Boycotts of McDonalds and Starbucks severely impacted the chains in Southeast Asia.

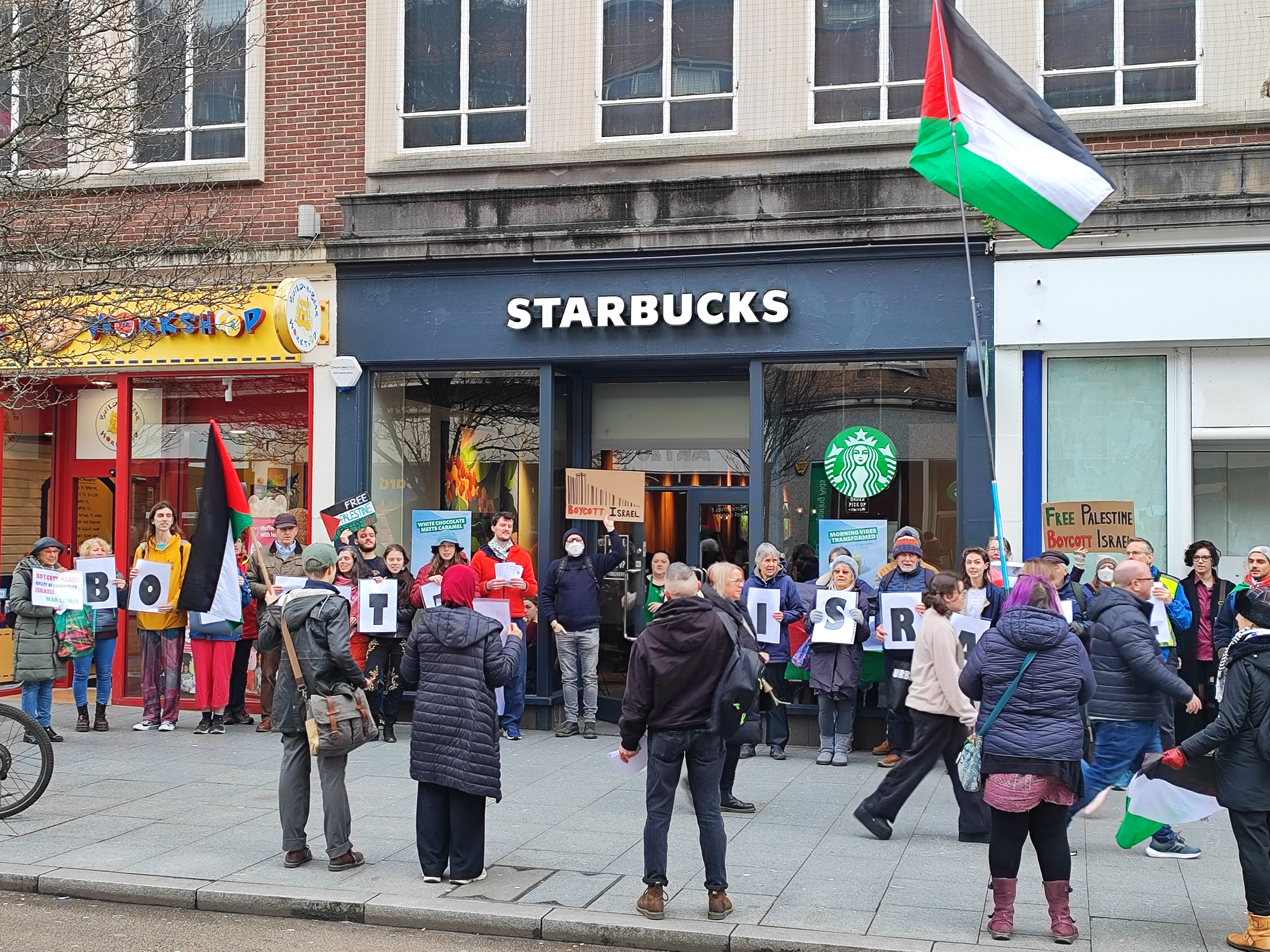
Pro-Palestinian protest outside Starbucks in Exeter, England on 10 February 2024

On 4 January 2024, McDonald's CEO Chris Kempczinski stated the boycotts were hurting sales across the Middle East. On 31 January, Starbucks CEO Laxman Narasimhan stated that boycotts of the company in the US and Middle East had caused the company to lower its yearly sales forecasts. In March 2024, Starbucks announced more than 2,000 layoffs across the Middle East and North Africa due to the boycotts.

Direct action was taken at arms factories in the United States and the United Kingdom that supplied arms to Israel, such as Lockheed Martin, General Dynamics, Textron, Boeing, L3Harris, Raytheon Technologies and Northrop Grumman. For instance, on 10 November 2023, trade unionists in Rochester, Kent, blocked the entrances to a BAE Systems factory, stating the facility manufactured military aircraft components used to bomb Gaza; and on 16 November, Palestine Action occupied a Leonardo factory in Southampton, stopping production. ZIM was barred from entering ports in Malaysia.

Student protesters called on Columbia University to financially divest from any company with business ties to the Israeli government, including Microsoft, Google and Amazon. NYU Alumni for Palestine called on New York University to "terminate all vendor contracts with companies playing active roles in the military occupation in Palestine and ongoing genocide in Gaza, namely Cisco, Lockheed Martin, Caterpillar and General Electric".

==== Limit request ====
Pro-Palestinian protesters in France demanded to limit the participation of Israeli athletes in the Olympics. These people gathered in front of the headquarters of the Olympic Games in Paris.

=== Corporations ===
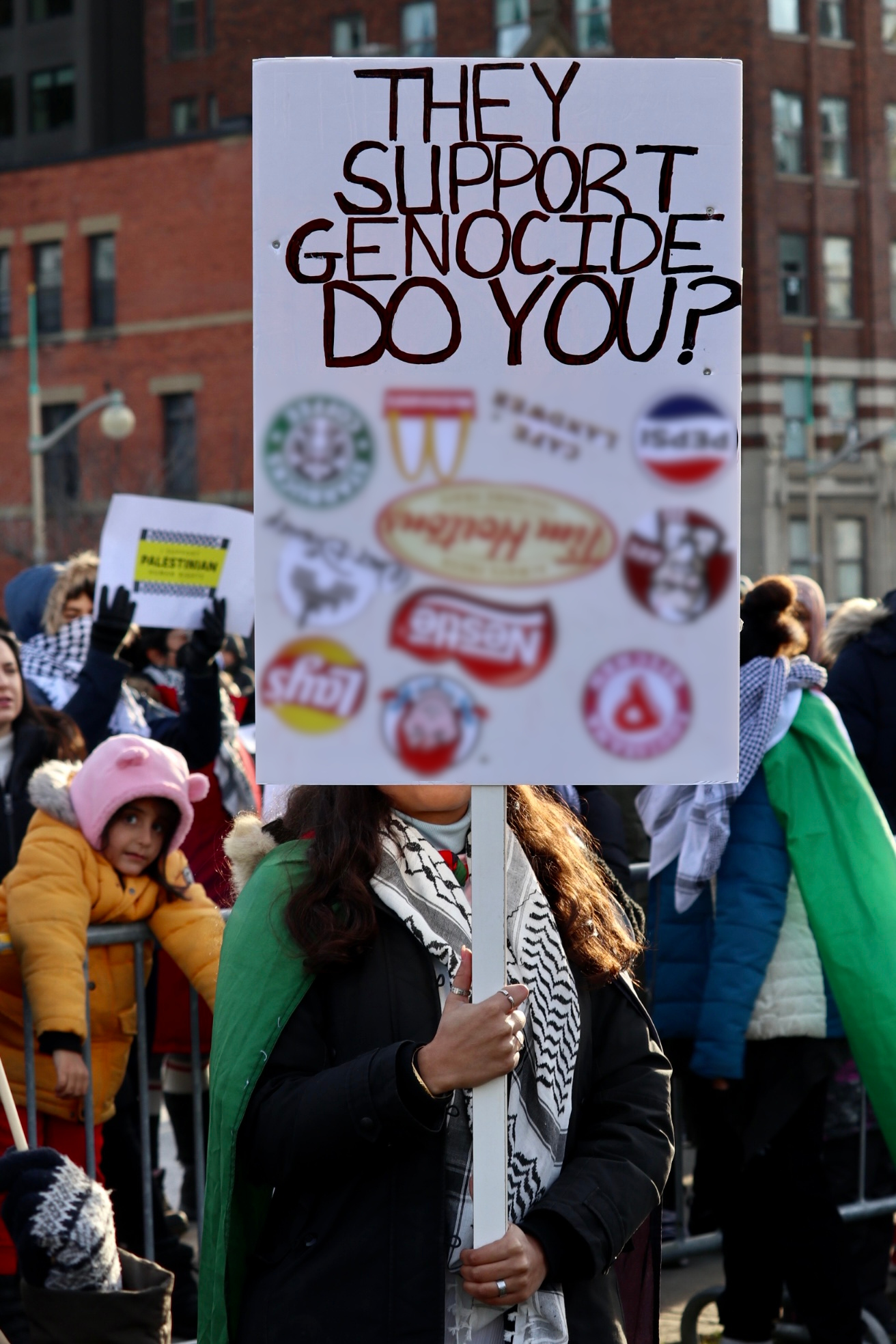
Pro-Palestinian protest in Ottawa, Canada, 23 November 2023

American companies have expressed support for Israel, including financial support. Yale Professor Jeffrey Sonnenfeld made a "list of companies have spoken out to condemn Hamas's terrorist attack on Israel". According to Al Jazeera, few major corporations have expressed a position on "Israel's retaliatory air raids on Gaza". Some companies have been criticized for their support; others have been criticized for their silence. On 16 January 2024, Ben & Jerry's became one of the first multinational corporations to call for a ceasefire.

=== Global protests ===
On 11 December 2023, a global strike was called, with activists encouraging participants to refrain from going to work, school, or making any purchases. Supporters of the strike blocked the entrance of The New York Times.

On 13 January 2024, on the 100th day since the beginning of the war, protests for a ceasefire were held around the world, including in London, Paris, Vienna, Berlin, Johannesburg, Amman, Washington DC, Baghdad, and Chicago.

Journalists of Agence France-Presse staged protests around the world in support of their colleagues in Gaza, with the AFP global news director stating, "The AFP newsroom wanted to express its whole-hearted support for our Gaza colleagues who are working in dire conditions and under constant fear of bombardment".

=== Technology ===
Activists used social media, such as X and TikTok, to share information about the war. Pro-Palestinian activists adopted the watermelon emoji as a symbol to represent solidarity with the people of Gaza. TikTok was a source of ire for some, with people such as former US president Barack Obama criticizing "TikTok activism" for obscuring context. Celebrities, including Sacha Baron Cohen and Amy Schumer, held a private meeting with TikTok executives accusing them of spreading antisemitism. TikTok stated it was not biased, but that young people were organically more supportive of Palestine. On 18 November, Elon Musk announced any user who used the phrases "decolonization" or "from the river to the sea" would be suspended from X. (Note: The announcement came after Disney, Apple, Paramount and Lionsgate pulled advertisements from X following Musk's endorsement of an antisemitic conspiracy theory, which US president Joe Biden called "abhorrent".) Pro-Palestinian content creators in the U.S. reported widespread shadowbanning. Critics of Israel also alleged they were censored or shadowbanned on the comment sections of Finnish national media outlets in November.

Anonymous Sudan, a hacker group, launched a DDoS attack on ChatGPT after Tal Broda – a member of OpenAI's leadership – made social media posts which expressed support for Israel and called for more intense bombing in Gaza.

In January 2024, the Israeli government reportedly purchased a technological system for conducting large-scale influence campaigns online. In February 2024, Israeli supporters adopted AI tools to report pro-Palestinian content en masse for supposedly violating site guidelines.

Misinformation in the Gaza war is generated by machine learning models were used by activists to solicit support, as well as to create the artificial impression of broader support. AI-generated images and deepfakes went viral online, though they were simultaneously fact-checked. Technology companies were accused of profiting from AI-generated images related to the war, as well as for building models that generated content reflecting anti-Palestinian biases.

The Israeli prosecutor's office sent over 8,000 removal requests to Meta and TikTok for content related to the war, resulting in 94% of the requests being removed. The Intercept reported Meta had allowed Hebrew and Arabic-language ads, generated by digital rights advocates to test the limits of Facebook's machine-learning moderation, calling for a "holocaust for the Palestinians". In December 2023, Meta's independent oversight board released a report stating Facebook overly censored conflict-related posts, with civil rights organizations stating Meta had suppressed Palestinian content.

=== Trade unions ===
On 16 October, the Palestinian General Federation of Trade Unions issued an urgent call for international trade unions to halt the arms trade to Israel. On 31 October, transport workers' unions in Belgium instructed their members to refuse to handle military equipment headed to Israel. On 7 November, the port stevedores' union in Barcelona refused to handle military material citing the war on Gaza, although the Spanish government said it had no plans to supply lethal weaponry for the conflict. On 9 November, more than 2,900 doctors in the United Kingdom signed an open letter to the British Medical Association demanding action to support Gaza. On 13 November, ten major trade unions in India called the war on Gaza "shamelessly genocidal" and urged workers to refuse to handle Israeli cargo. On 18 February, the Water Transport Workers Federation of India stated it would not load or unload weapons to Israel.

=== Universities ===
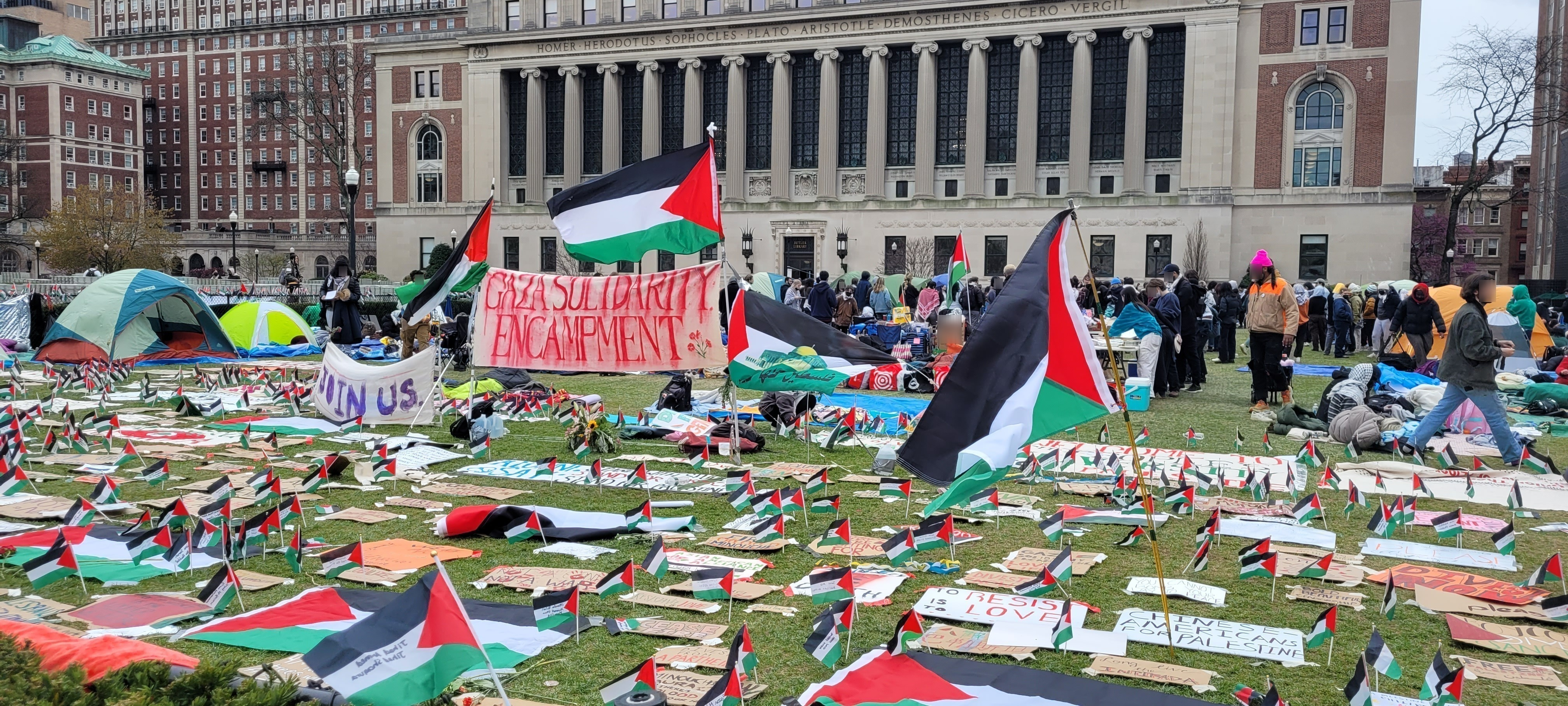
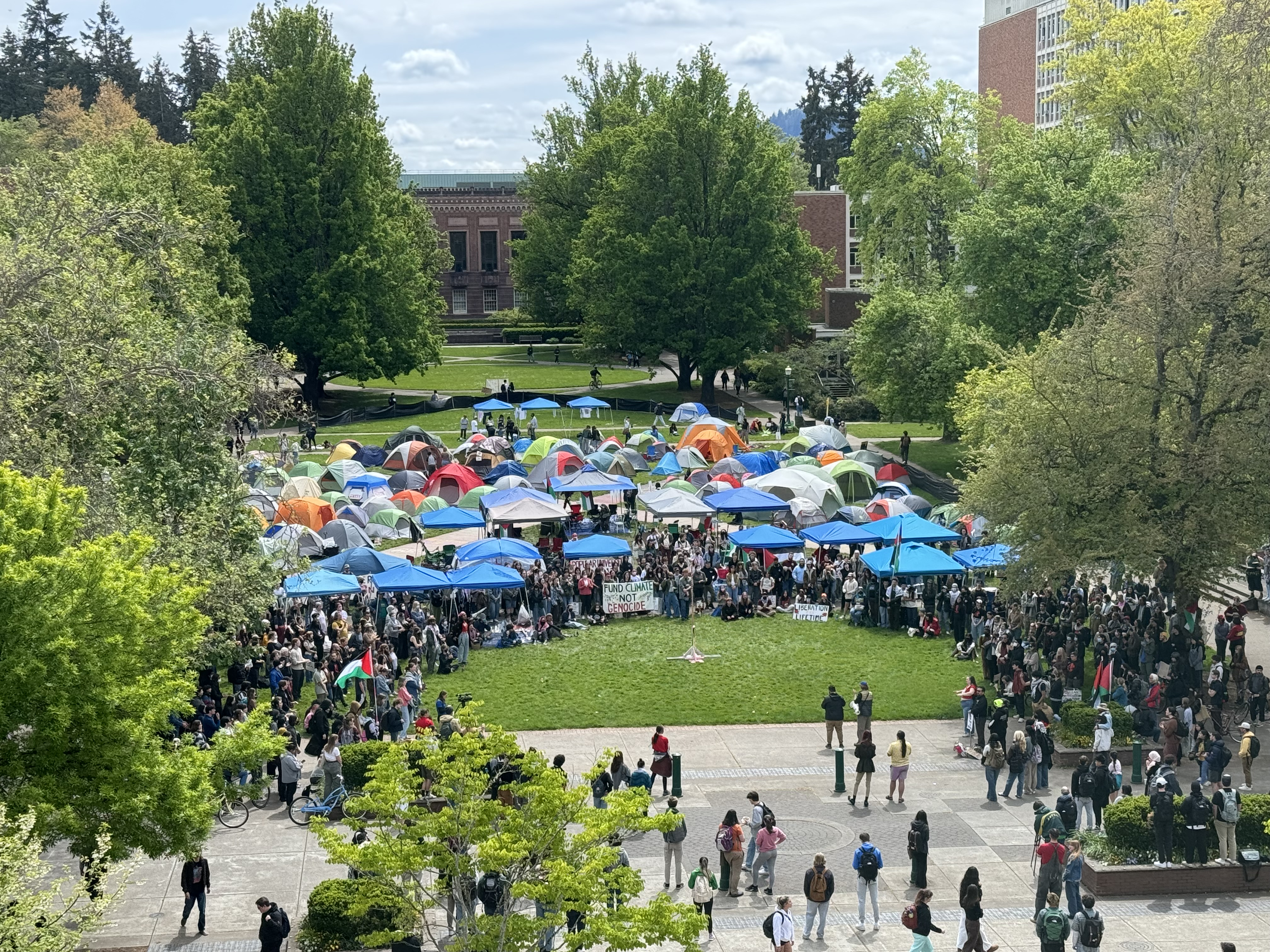
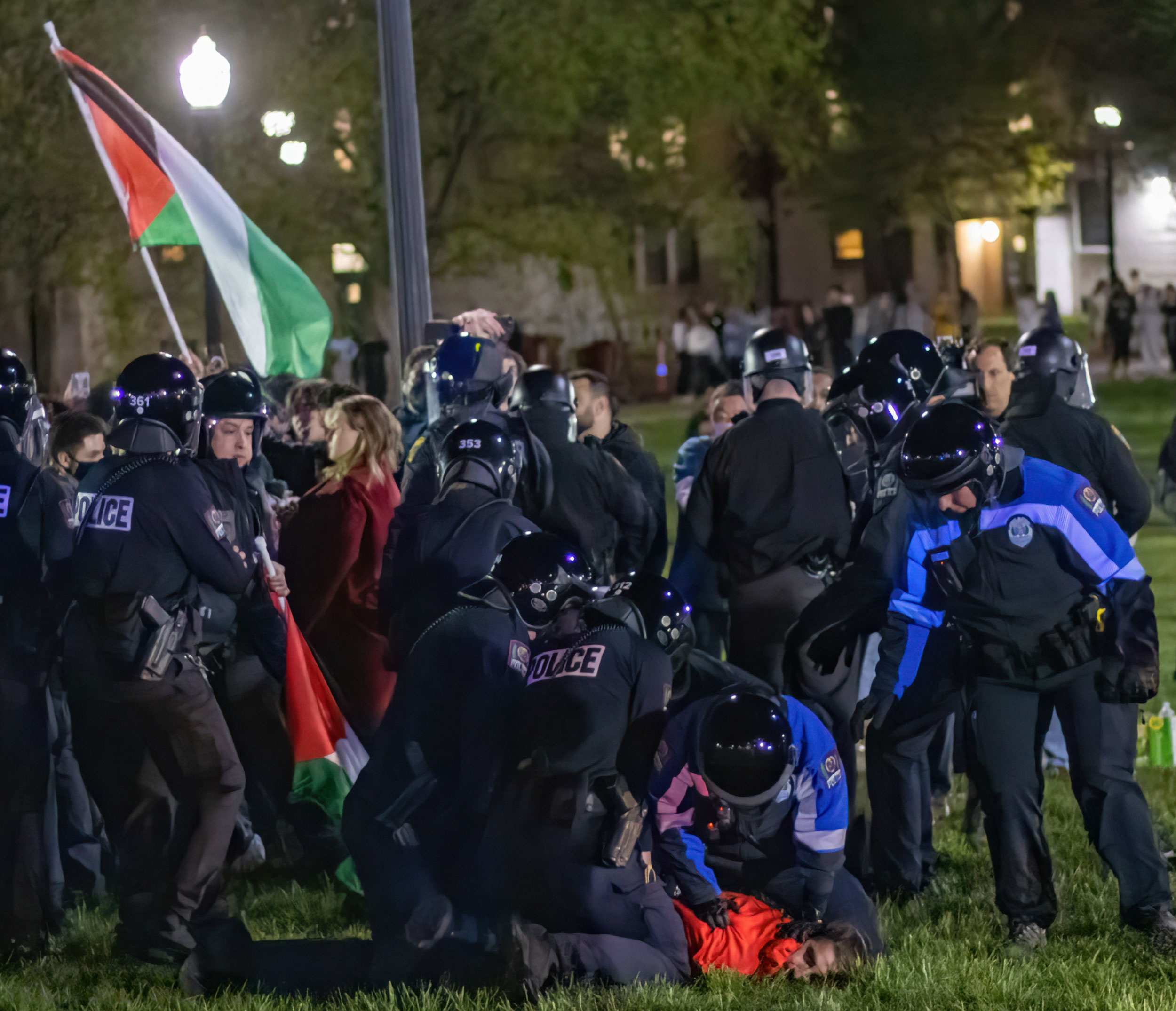
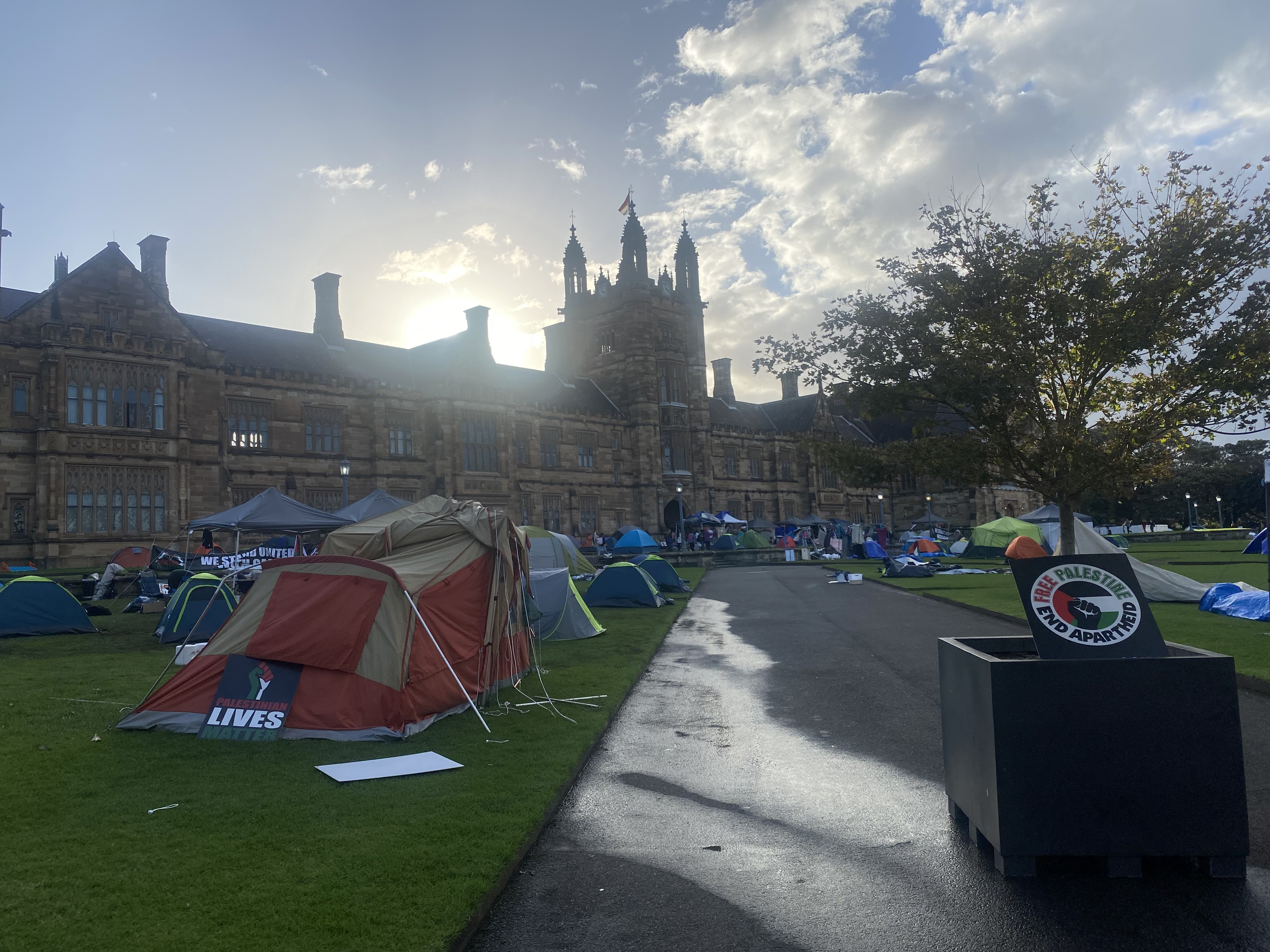
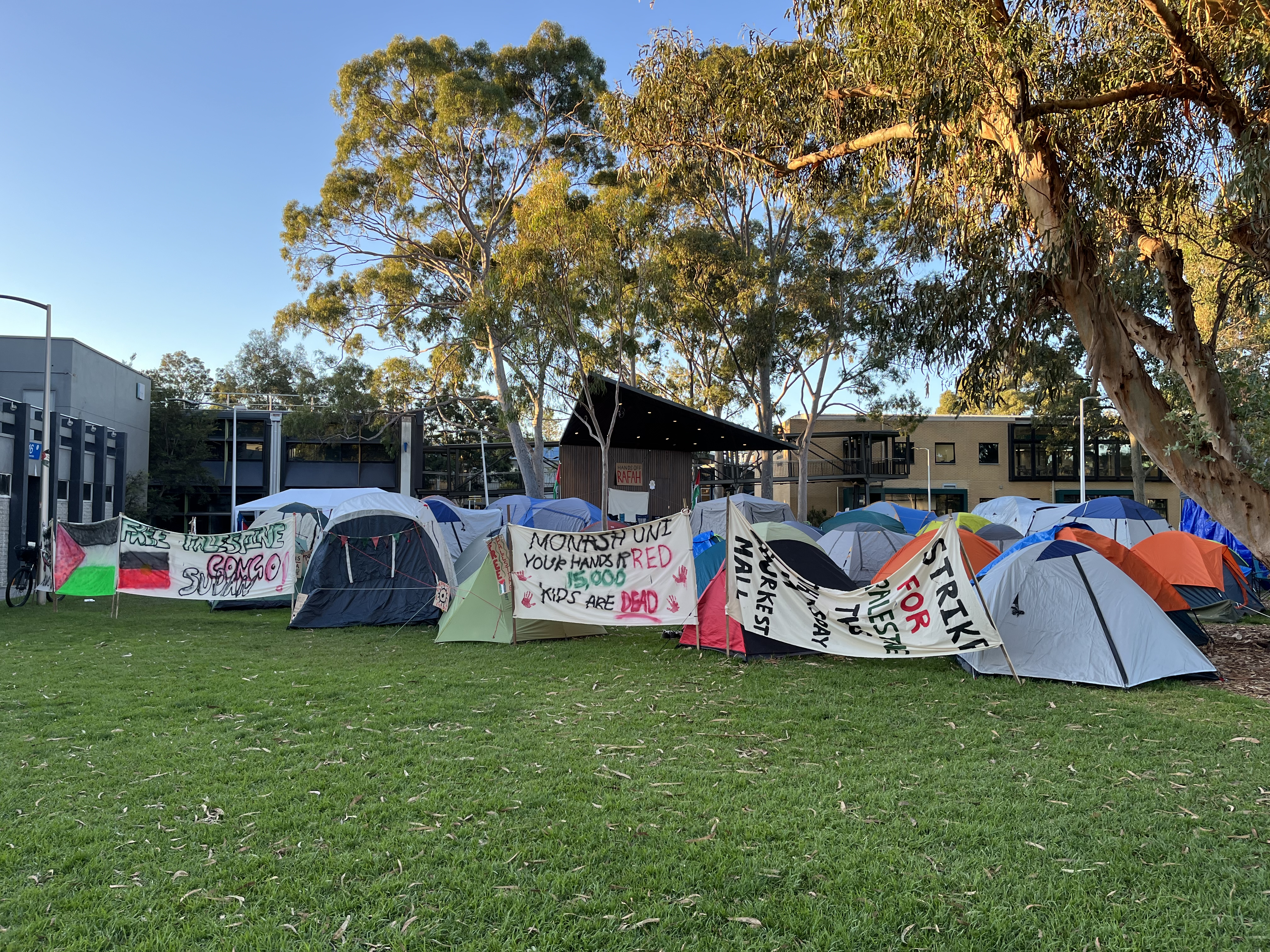
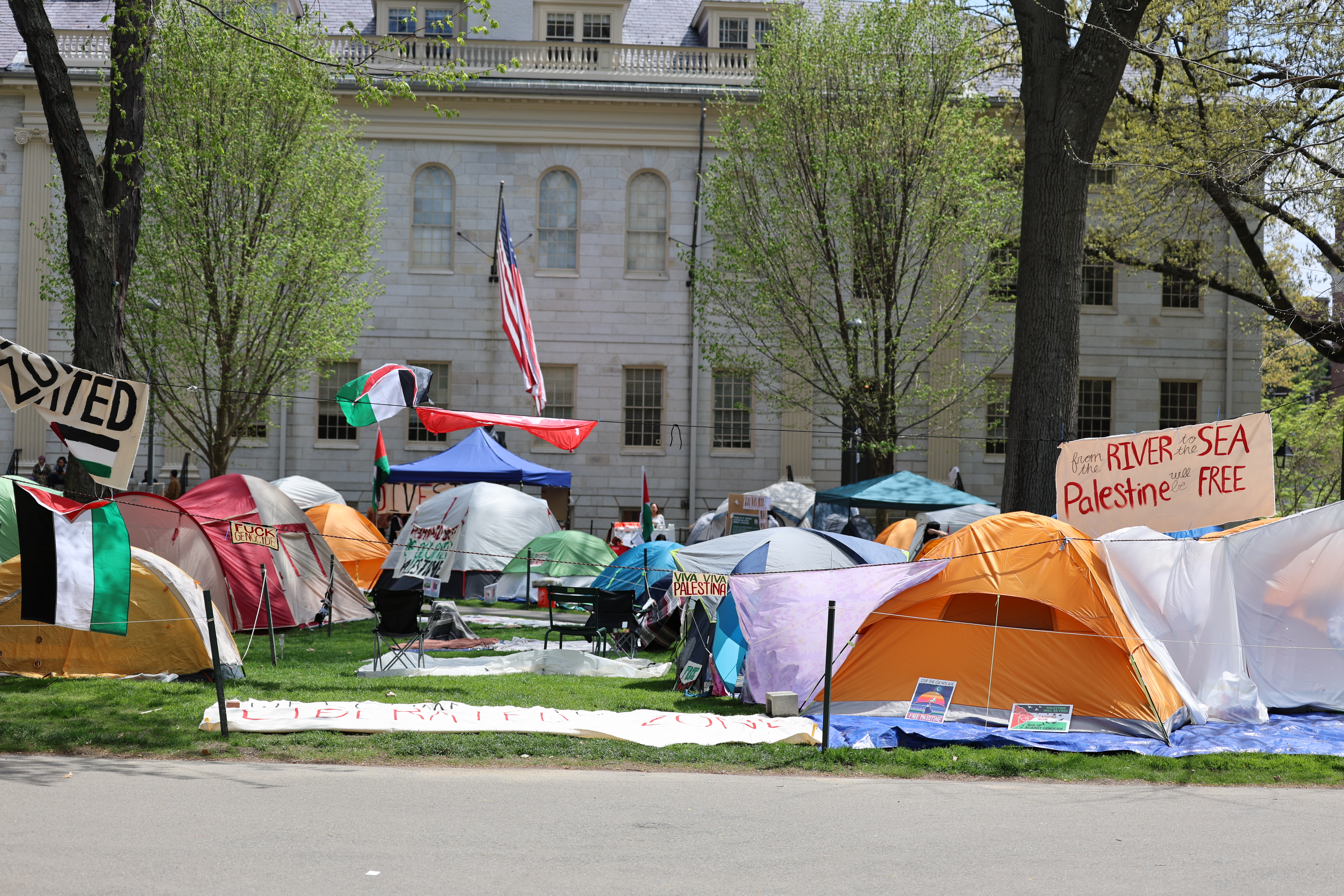
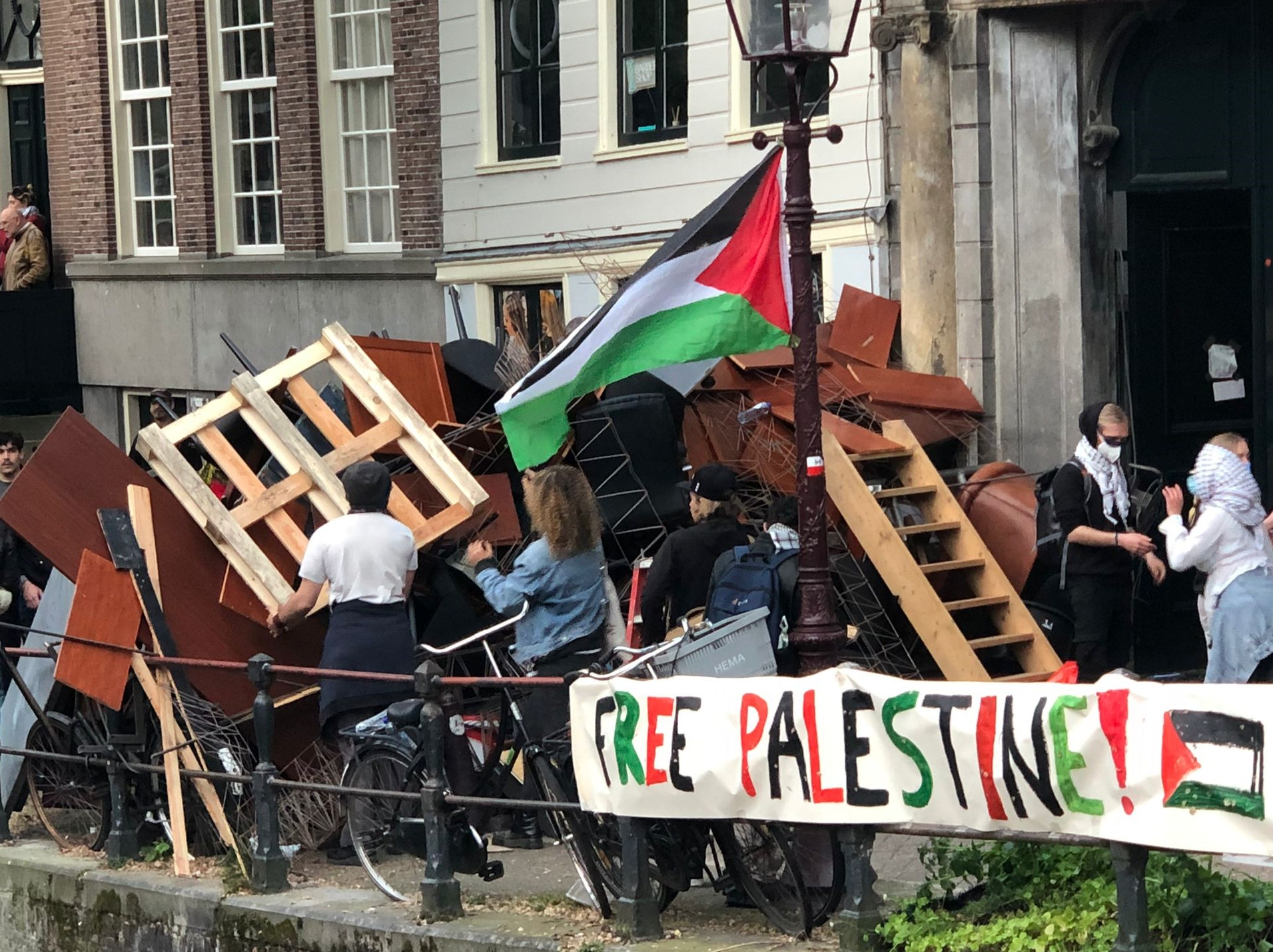
Clockwise from top:
- Columbia University
- Ohio State University
- Monash University
- University of Amsterdam
- Harvard University
- University of Sydney
- University of Oregon

By May 6, 2024, student protests had occurred in 45 of the 50 states in the United States and the District of Columbia, with encampments, occupations, walkouts or sit-ins on almost 140 campuses. Thirty-four encampments were established in the United Kingdom; across universities in Australia, beginning with the University of Sydney; and in Canada, including an encampment at McGill University. On May 7, protests spread further on European campuses after mass arrests at the University of Amsterdam campus occupation, including occupation of campus buildings at Leipzig University in Germany, Sciences Po in France, and Ghent University in Belgium. By May 8, protests had taken place in more than 25 countries, and on May 13, approximately 1,000 Dutch students and university staff took part in a national walk-out.

=== Queer Groups ===
LGBTQ advocacy in the Gaza war has remained a significantly contentious topic. Many LGBTQ people allied themselves with pro-Palestinian causes, especially in protest movements against the ongoing war, and against the Gaza genocide. Some pro-Palestinian LGBTQ people have claimed common cause between queer liberation and Palestinian liberation, though others have called such movements antisemitic and self-contradictory. Some pro-Israeli LGBTQ people have complained about feeling excluded from traditionally LGBTQ spaces due to pro-Palestinian LGBTQ advocacy.

=== 13 October ===
Khaled Meshaal, a former leader of Hamas, appealed on 6 October for people "head to the squares and streets" in solidarity with Gaza on 13 October. In a later statement on 10 October, Meshaal explicitly called for protests in all cities with Muslim communities. As a result of distorted rumours, media groups reported he had called for "global day of jihad" or a "day of rage", though his reported comments included neither phrase. While the word "jihad" can refer to non-violent struggle, it has often been used radical groups to refer more narrowly to a holy war, and some took Meshaal's comments to advocate violence.

The Israeli National Security Council and the Foreign Ministry issued a press release cautioning protests were "liable to turn violent". The Israeli government advised its citizens overseas to avoid any demonstrations or protests on 13 October. Rumours and fears were widespread, and "day of jihad"-related threats were made against Jews and Muslims. There was a heightened police presence at Jewish and Muslim sites, events were cancelled, and children stayed home from Jewish schools.

As a result of the reports, rallies opposing Israeli military action were banned in France, and restricted in Germany and Hungary. Germany's ban specifically barred praise for murder or manslaughter, burning of the Israeli flag, or praise for the Hamas attack or the use of its symbols. Peaceful protests occurred around the world on 13 October. There were no major incidents in the Al-Aqsa area. In Jordan, police fired tear gas at about 500 protestors approaching the border with the West Bank. Anti-Israel protests in the border areas were banned, but licensed protests were permitted elsewhere. In the West Bank, four Palestinian protestors were killed by Israeli forces. Seven had been killed the previous day.

An Ingush man carried out a stabbing attack at a school in Arras, France, killing a teacher and injuring three staff members, in an attack that was linked to the supposed "Global Day of Jihad". The suspect was previously known to the French security services for his involvement with radical Islamism.

On 14 October, a six-year-old boy in Illinois named Wadea al-Fayoume was killed, by his 71-year-old landlord, who was said by his wife to have been afraid of Hamas' "national day of jihad" and convinced something would happen.

== Responses ==
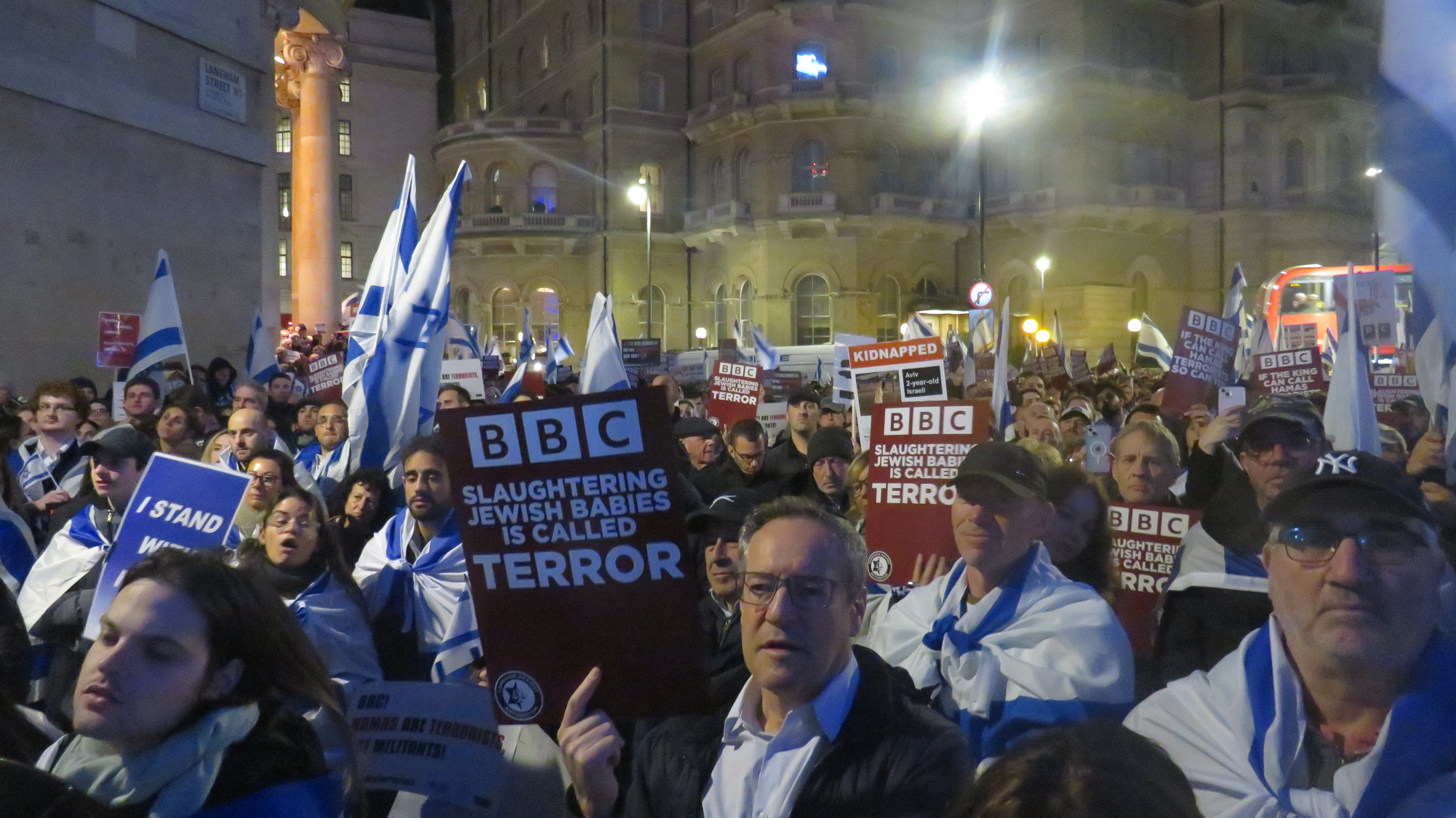
Pro-Israel protest in London, 16 October

On 17 October, a group of 75 Israeli politicians and public intellectuals identified with left-wing politics published an open letter addressing what they called "a disturbing trend in the global Left's political culture". The authors, which include Aviad Kleinberg, Ibtisam Mara'ana, Eva Illouz, Ortal Ben Dayan, Orna Ben-Naftali, Galia Sabar, Dov Khenin, David Grossman, Taleb el-Sana, Mossi Raz, Amit Schejter and Ruth Halperin-Kaddari, acknowledged their many peers in the Arab world and elsewhere that have condemned the attack, but noted with dismay that "some elements within the global Left... have reacted with indifference to these horrific events and sometimes even justified Hamas's actions". They state that "[Hamas's] core commitments are fundamentally inconsistent with progressive principles", and emphasize that "there is no contradiction between staunchly opposing the Israeli subjugation and occupation of Palestinians and unequivocally condemning brutal acts of violence against innocent civilians. In fact, every consistent Leftist must hold both positions simultaneously. Anat Kamm, Helen Lewis, Yascha Mounk, Jonathan Chait, Anshel Pfeffer, David Witzthum, Nitzan Horowitz and others have also observed discrepancies in the international reactions to Hamas's attack and Israel's response.

In a speech to the United States Senate, Majority Leader Chuck Schumer asked if "anybody [can] imagine a horrific terrorist attack in another country receiving such a reception", and warned that "Antisemites are taking advantage of the pro-Palestinian movement to espouse hatred and bigotry toward Jewish people".

Nobel Prize laureate Aaron Ciechanover criticized the presidents of "elite American universities" for their "feeble" response to the events on 7 October, for demonstrating "ignorance of the historical and geopolitical background of the conflict", for allowing demonstrations "accompanied by a wave of antisemitism and anti-Israelism", and for failing to support Jewish students who find themselves afraid of visiting campus.

Over 300 faculty members at the University of Pennsylvania signed an open letter "calling on the University community to condemn the Hamas attacks on Israel and support Israel's right to defend itself".

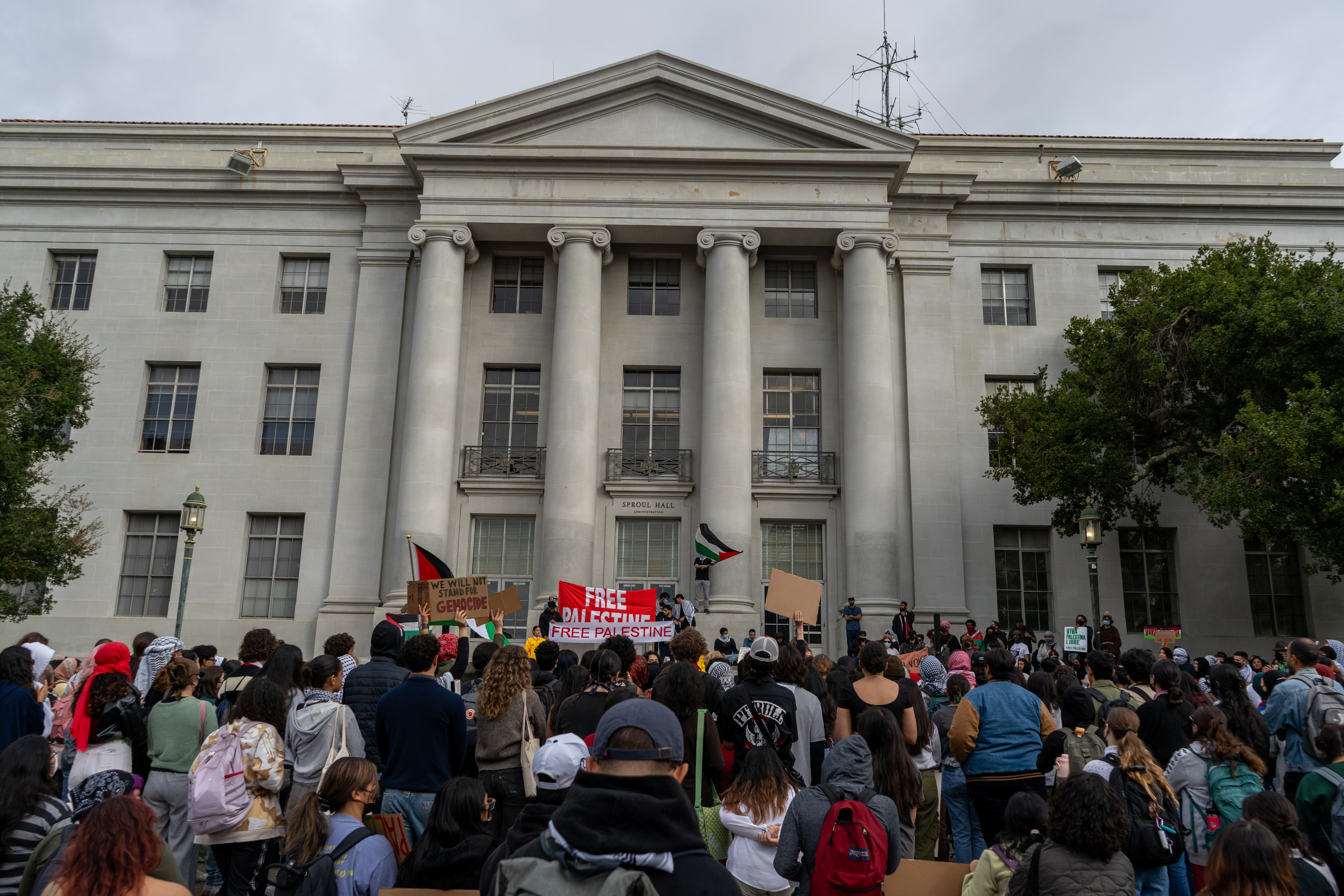
Pro-Palestinian protest outside Sproul Hall at the University of California, Berkeley, 25 October

Over 300 faculty members at University of California, Berkeley signed an open letter calling for the immediate release of all hostages held by Hamas, and expressing their "disappointment" with "some student organizations' support of Hamas".

Students at Yale and Columbia universities, and the parent of a Cornell alumnus, started petitions for the dismissal of faculty members they accused of supporting or endorsing Hamas's attack. The petitions have drawn a total of over 100,000 signatories.

According to Vox, antisemitic incidents are on the rise in France, Germany, and the UK.

On 28 January 2024, Congresswoman Nancy Pelosi suggested that some pro-Palestinian protesters calling for a ceasefire could be connected to Russia and called on the FBI to investigate the possible connection.

=== Ban ===
==== Algeria ====
In August 2025, Algerian authorities banned a planned pro-Palestine solidarity march, citing concerns over potential political unrest. Although the government has consistently expressed support for the Palestinian cause in international forums, it has imposed restrictions on public demonstrations, including those related to Gaza. The move drew criticism from opposition figures and civil society groups, who argued that the ban contradicted Algeria's official stance and reflected broader efforts to suppress public assembly since the 2019 Hirak protests.

==== Austria ====
In Vienna, police banned a pro-Palestine protest on the grounds that it used the phrase "from the river to the sea" in its invites, which police alleged was a call to violence against Israelis.

==== Fiji ====
Police denied an application by students of the University of the South Pacific to march in solidarity with Palestine. Minister for Home Affairs Pio Tikoduadua said that for the procession to be allowed, "they must, in fairness, grant permission to pro-Israeli groups who may wish to express their perspectives and grievances".

==== France ====
France implemented a ban on all pro-Palestinian demonstrations. Interior Minister Gerald Darmanin declared the ban, citing concerns related to public order. He emphasized that "Pro-Palestinian demonstrations must be prohibited because they are likely to generate disturbances to public order" and warned that organizing such protests would result in arrests. Nonetheless, France's highest administrative court stated that pro-Palestinian protests should be assessed on a case-by-case basis, while still affirming the validity of Darmanin's directive.

==== Germany ====
In Germany, authorities imposed prohibitions on most protests advocating for Palestinian rights in response to reported anti-Semitic occurrences during an anti-Israel protest. A Berlin court upheld the ban on a scheduled pro-Palestinian demonstration in the city. In the face of these restrictions, human rights organizations urged authorities to ensure and enable the rights of all people to express their opinions and peacefully assemble.

==== Hungary ====
Referring to planned pro-Palestine rallies in Hungary, Prime minister Viktor Orbán said "it is shocking that there were sympathy rallies supporting the terrorists across Europe", and that Hungary "will not allow sympathy rallies supporting terrorist organisations", referring to Hamas.

==== Singapore ====
The Singapore Police Force and the National Parks Board announced that no public events and assemblies related to the war, including those in the Speakers' Corner, would be permitted.

==== Turkey ====
In February 2025, Turkish authorities rejected permission for the Republican People's Party (CHP) to hold a pro-Palestine march on Galata Bridge. The party accused the authorities of double standards and the CHP chairman of Istanbul, Özgür Çelik, condemned the decision.

==== United Kingdom ====
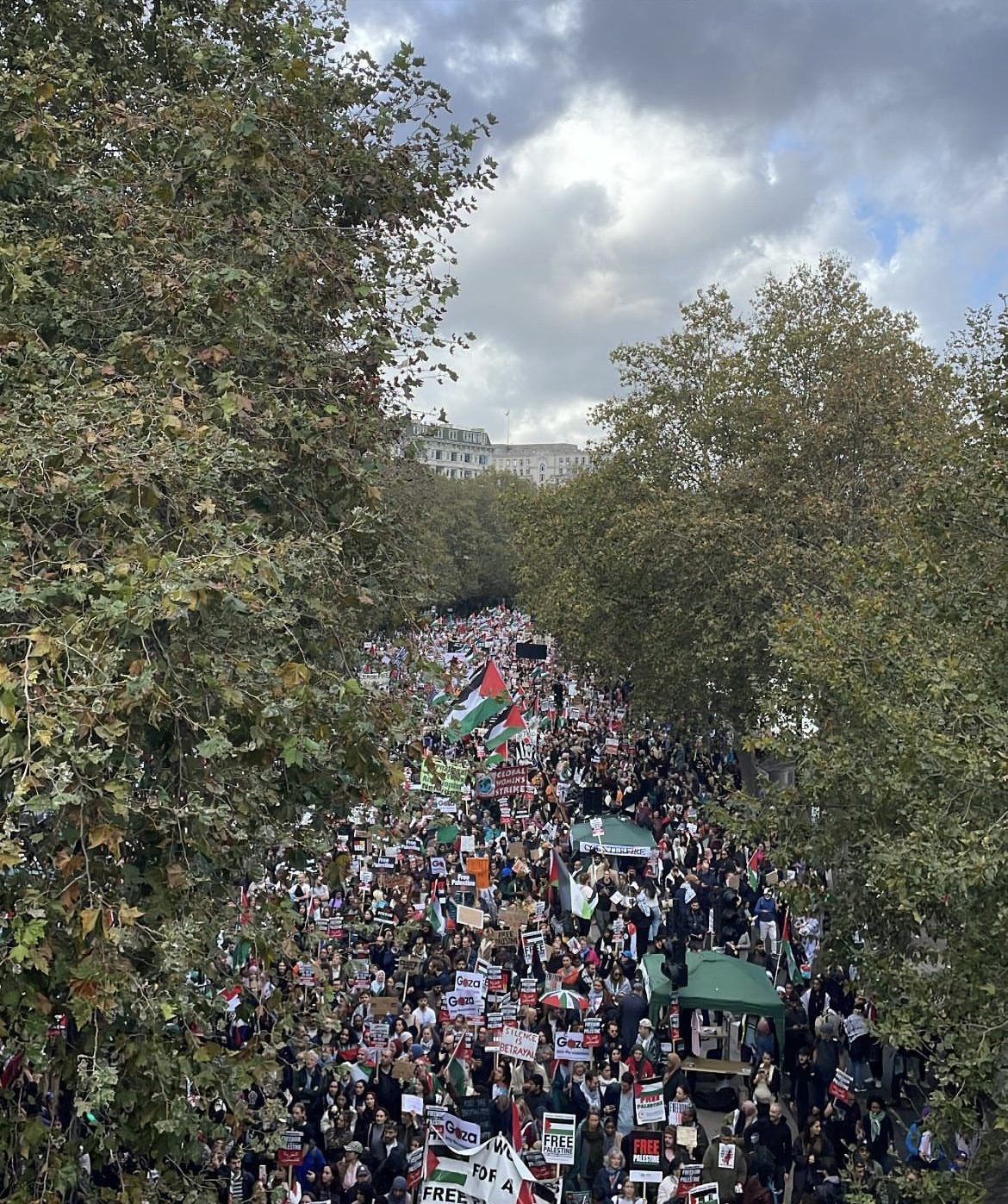
Pro-Palestinian rally in London, 28 October

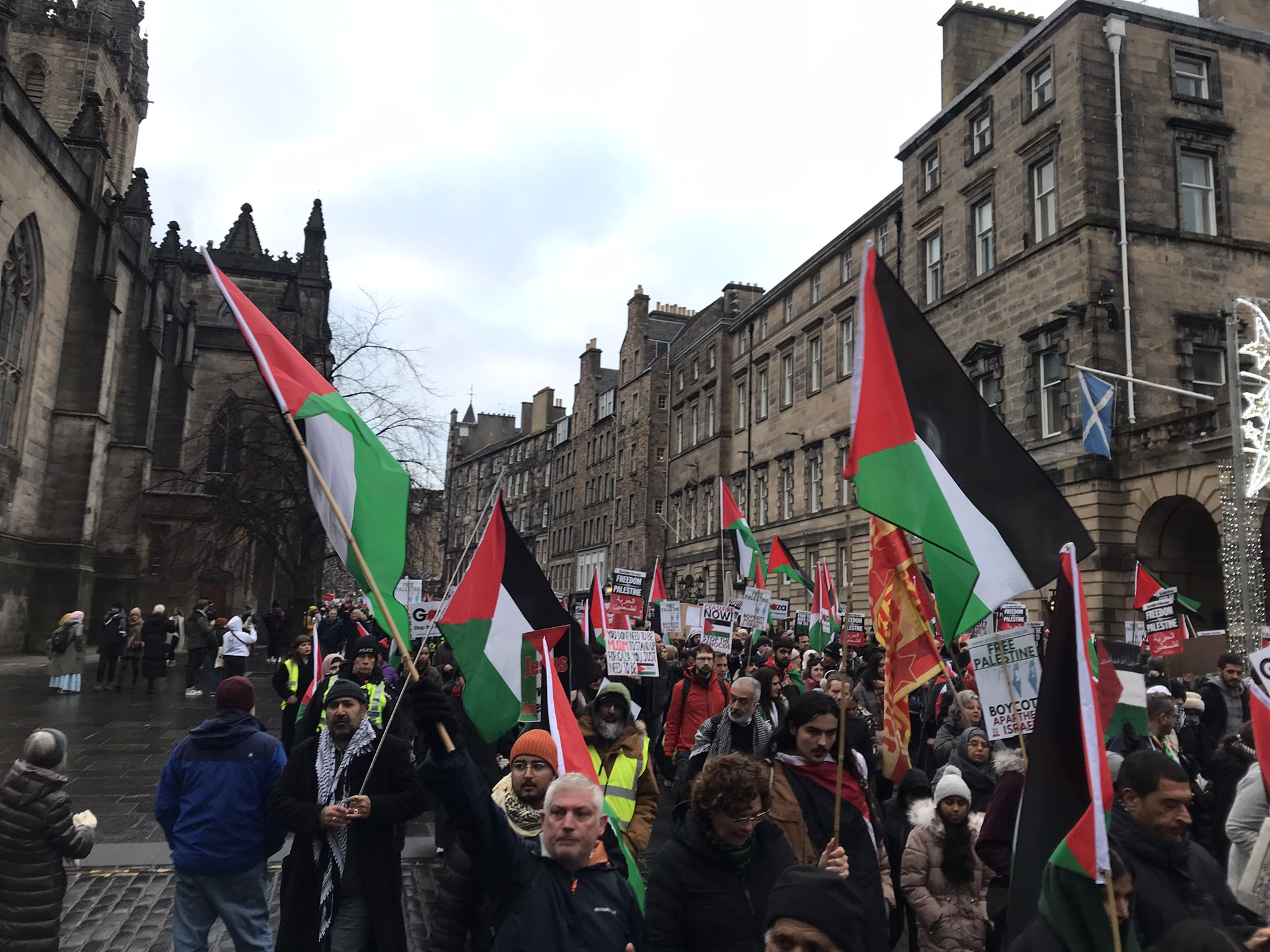
Pro-Palestine demonstration in Edinburgh, 2 December

UK Home Secretary Suella Braverman urged police to consider the use of Palestinian flags and some associated chants or symbols with the Palestinian cause (such as "from the river to the sea, Palestine will be free") in certain circumstances as a "racially aggravated" offence that should face legal consequences under Section 5 of the Public Order Act 1986. Braverman was also criticized after she accused police of applying "double standards" and favouritism in their response to demonstrations, saying that aggressive right-wing protesters were "rightly met with a stern response", while "pro-Palestinian mobs" were "largely ignored".

Exiled Egyptian television presenter Moataz Matar had his UK visa cancelled by the Home Office and was placed on a watchlist barring him from reentry after he was accused of supporting Hamas following his participation in a pro-Palestine protest in London.

British author and political commentator Douglas Murray claimed that pro-Palestinian protesters were openly supporting Hamas on the streets of Britain.

==== United States ====
On 6 November, Brandeis University became the first private university in the United States to ban its student chapter of Students for Justice in Palestine. On 10 November, Columbia University suspended its campus chapters of Students for Justice in Palestine and Jewish Voice for Peace, thus barring them from hosting events on campus. Columbia's decision was criticized by Naomi Klein, Noura Erakat, and Sarah Schulman, who wrote: "We have reached a new moment in American history." After Harvard University banned the slogan "from the river to the sea", more than 100 faculty signed an open letter to university president Claudine Gay criticizing her censure.

=== Praise of pro-Palestinian protests ===
Iran's Supreme Leader Ayatollah Ali Khamenei has praised the pro-Palestinian campus protests on Twitter, praising American students and suggesting they were "on the right side of history". He further described the protesting students as part of the "resistance front" against Israel and encouraged them to "become familiar with the Quran."

== See also ==
- Outline of the Gaza war
- International reactions to the Gaza war
- Ninth Extraordinary Session of the Islamic Summit Conference
- Media coverage of the Gaza war
- 2023 exchange of Israeli hostages for Palestinian prisoners
- 2023 Gaza war ceasefire
- Global March to Gaza
- Global Sumud Flotilla
- Lists of pro-Palestinian protests
- Protest paradigm in media coverage of Gaza war protests
