= Rafah offensive =

2024–2025 Israeli offensive along the Egypt–Gaza border

- Part of the Israeli invasion of the Gaza Strip during the Gaza war and the Hamas–Popular Forces conflict
- Gaza Strip under Palestinian control Gaza Strip under Israeli control Furthest Israeli advance in Gaza Strip Evacuated areas inside Israel Maximum extent of the 2023 Hamas-led attack on Israel Area of Gaza subject to Israeli evacuation orders See here for a more detailed map.
Date	6 May 2024 – 26 May 2025 (1 year, 2 weeks and 6 days)
Location	Rafah Governorate, Gaza Strip (spillovers in Khan Yunis Governorate)
Result	Israel occupies Rafah; Palestinian militant activity continues in Rafah
Territorial changes	Rafah comes under full Israeli operational control, with a small pocket in Al-Bayuk being under the control of the Popular Forces. Insurgent activity persists.

Belligerents
Israel Israeli allies: (Palestine) Popular Forces (from May 2024)	Hamas Palestinian allies: Palestinian Islamic Jihad; Popular Front for the Liberation of Palestine; Democratic Front for the Liberation of Palestine; Al-Aqsa Martyrs' Brigades; Popular Resistance Committees; Abdul al-Qadir al-Husseini Brigades

Commanders and leaders
(Israel) Yaron Finkelman (Israel) Yaniv Asor (Israel) Itzik Cohen (Israel) Tomer Bar (Israel) Liron Betito (Israel) Beni Aharon (Israel) Omer Cohen (Palestine) Yasser Abu Shabab (Popular Forces)	(Hamas) Yahya Sinwar † (Hamas) Mohammed Deif X (Hamas) Mohammed Sinwar X (Hamas) Muhammad Shabana X (Hamas) Mahmoud Hamdan † (Hamas) Yousef Qadi (surrendered) (Hamas) Muhammed Zaarab (surrendered)

Units involved
Show units: Israel Defense Forces; Israeli Ground Forces; Southern Command; 36th Division; 188th Armored Brigade; 282nd Artillery Brigade; Golani Brigade; 12th Battalion; 98th Division; Oz Brigade; Egoz Unit; Maglan; Paratroopers Brigade; 146th Division; 4th Armored Brigade; 205th Armored Brigade; 5250th Battalion; 9215th Battalion; 162nd Division; Givati Brigade; 846th Battalion; Reconnaissance Battalion; Shaked Battalion; Tzabar Battalion; 401st Brigade; 9th Battalion; 46th Battalion; Bislamach Brigade; 450th Battalion; Nahal Brigade; 50th Battalion; Gadsar Nahal; Granite Battalion; 252nd Division; Negev Brigade; Armored Corps; Gaza Division; Desert Reconnaissance Battalion; 7th Armored Brigade; Combat Engineering Corps; 601st Battalion; 710th Battalion; 7107th Battalion; Yahalom; Combat Intelligence Collection Corps; Home Front Command; 489th Search & Rescue Battalion; Oketz Unit; Israeli Air Force; 123rd Squadron; 7th Wing; Unit 669; Israeli Navy; Shayetet 13; Military Intelligence Directorate; Unit 504; Ministry of Defense; Shin Bet; (Palestine) Popular Forces; Counter-Terrorism Service	Show units: (Palestine) Palestinian Joint Operations Room; (Hamas) Al-Qassam Brigades; Rafah Brigade; Eastern Rafah Battalion; Shaboura Battalion; Tel al-Sultan Battalion; Yibna Battalion; (Palestinian Islamic Jihad) Al-Quds Brigades; (Popular Front for the Liberation of Palestine) Abu Ali Mustafa Brigades; National Resistance Brigades; Al-Aqsa Martyrs' Brigades; Al-Nasser Salah al-Deen Brigades; Abdul al-Qadir al-Husseini Brigades

Strength
(Israel) 3,000–5,000+ soldiers 300+ Popular Forces militants (per Hamas)	Per Israel: 8,000+ militants; (Hamas) 7,000–8,000

Casualties and losses
Per Israel: 44 soldiers, 1 Defense Ministry contractor killed 109 soldiers, 1 Military Intelligence Directorate interrogator and 2 Defense Ministry employees injured 1 UH-60 Black Hawk helicopter crashed Several Popular Forces militants killed Per Hamas: 20+ Popular Forces militants killed	Per Israel (disputed, see Combatant casualties): (Hamas) 2,308+ fighters killed
- 2 UN staff members killed, 1 WHO staff member injured 2 Egyptian border guards killed 8 Israeli hostages killed, 3 civilians injured 1,000,000+ Palestinians displaced (est.)

The Rafah offensive was an Israeli military offensive in and around the city of Rafah, beginning on 6 May 2024 as part of Israel's invasion of the Gaza Strip during the Gaza war. The operation focused on the Rafah Governorate along the Egypt–Gaza border, with Israeli officials saying the goals were to defeat remaining Hamas forces in the area and to secure the border corridor and the Rafah crossing with Egypt.

The operation began as ceasefire negotiations brokered by Egypt and Qatar failed. Israeli forces carried out airstrikes, entered the outskirts of Rafah, and seized the Rafah crossing, later moving into populated neighbourhoods. Fighting and security concerns also led to temporary closures of the Kerem Shalom and Rafah crossings further exacerbating the humanitarian crisis in Gaza.

On 19 January 2025, a ceasefire between Israel and Hamas went into effect, and the IDF withdrew from some parts of Rafah. On the night of 18 March 2025, Israel launched a surprise attack on the Gaza Strip, breaking the ceasefire. Israeli troops resumed ground operations in Rafah on 20 March 2025. In May 2025, the offensive formally ended, when Israel had established operational control over Rafah and the border zone.

== Background ==
On 7 October 2023, Hamas and allied militants sparked the Gaza war by invading and attacking southern Israel, killing almost 1,200 people, mostly civilians, and taking more than 250 hostages. Following this, Israel retaliated by imposing a total blockade on Gaza, heavily bombing it, invading it, and conducting mass evacuations. Both Israel and Hamas were accused of war crimes.

Since the start of the war, Palestinians in the Gaza Strip sought shelter in the southernmost area of Rafah, near the Egyptian border. With other cities in Gaza depopulated, Rafah became the most populous city in the Palestinian territories, with more than 1.4 million people. Due to the large number of children among those displaced peoples, UNICEF termed Rafah "a city of children".

While Israeli politicians like Prime Minister Benjamin Netanyahu during the offensive had emphasized about Israel controlling the Egypt–Gaza border near Rafah in order to prevent Hamas from smuggling weapons from Egypt through underground tunnels, others accused of him using it as a pretext to avoid reaching a permanent ceasefire deal in exchange for the Israeli hostages abducted by Hamas. Per Nadav Argaman, a former director of Shin Bet, the number of weapons smuggled through tunnels beneath the border was minuscule as Egypt had dismantled most of the tunnel network, and most of the smuggling at the border was done through the Rafah border crossing, an assessment former Israeli national security advisor Eyal Hulata agreed with. An investigation by The New York Times found that nearly all of the underground tunnels were destroyed by Egypt after 2013. Per a report by The Jerusalem Post, Hamas used the border area mainly for launching rockets on Israel rather than for smuggling.

Airstrikes on Rafah started on 8 October 2023, and continued throughout the war. Israel announced its intentions to invade Rafah in February 2024, which met backlash from the international community. The United States, Israel's largest military supplier, also opposed an offensive.

On 12 February, South Africa, as part of its genocide case against Israel, requested that the International Court of Justice impose additional measures on Israel to not invade Rafah. Israel said it had a right to defend itself by entering Rafah to eliminate Hamas. The court rejected the measure, saying its provisional measures already prevented Israel from an invasion.

In advance of the offensive, the United States announced it had paused a weapons shipment, and that it wouldn't supply offensive weapons for Israel's assault. In response, IDF spokesman Daniel Hagari stated, "The army has armaments for the missions it plans, and for the missions in Rafah too - we have what we need."

=== Ceasefire negotiations ===
Ceasefire negotiations between Israel and Hamas had reached the closest to success in May. Hamas was expected to agree to a deal that resulted in the release of hostages and an end to the war. However, Israel and Hamas disagreed on the issue of ending the war completely after a hostage deal, with Israel saying it would "under no circumstances" accept a deal with such provisions. This led to the faltering of negotiations.

On 5 May, more than 10 rockets were launched from the Rafah area toward Kerem Shalom, killing four Israeli soldiers and wounding 11. Hamas took responsibility for the attack. Negotiations collapsed, and Israel began to strike Rafah, killing five people. On 6 May, the IDF ordered the evacuation of civilians from eastern Rafah to parts of central Gaza and Khan Yunis. An offensive seemed imminent, and the evacuation was condemned by multiple countries. Later that day, Hamas accepted a ceasefire deal from Egypt and Qatar. The deal included a 6-week ceasefire and exchange of prisoners. However, Israel rejected this deal. Israeli Prime Minister Benjamin Netanyahu commented that these terms were "far from Israel's basic requirements", while the Israeli war cabinet voted to invade Rafah. Israel said it would send a delegation to continue ceasefire negotiations, while also continuing its offensive in the meantime. Israel also Said that the United States was aware of, but did not tell Israel about, the deal negotiated between Hamas, Egypt and Qatar.

== Timeline ==
=== 2024 ===
==== 6 May to 13 May ====
On 6 May, before and during the offensive, Israel struck Rafah at least 50 times. Later that day, in a limited invasion, the IDF entered the outskirts of Rafah and approached the Rafah Border Crossing and the Egyptian border. 20 Hamas gunmen were killed in the operation, according to the IDF. In addition, it reported discovering three tunnels and destroying an explosive-laden car. On the morning of 7 May, the IDF captured the Rafah Crossing. Hamas continued to shell the Kerem Shalom Crossing from Rafah, launching six mortars and rockets. The Givati Brigade separately seized the portion of Salah al-Din Road in eastern Rafah in an overnight operation.

Haaretz reported that administration of the Rafah Crossing would be handed over to a private firm, and that the operation was limited and intended to exert pressure on Hamas. John Kirby, the White House National Security Communications Advisor, similarly said that Israel had told the US that the operation was limited and intended to prevent smuggling of arms and money into the Gaza Strip, with negotiations for the release of Israeli hostages and a ceasefire resuming. Israel's Minister of Defense, Yoav Gallant, said that the operation would not stop unless Hamas was eliminated or Israeli hostages were released.

On 8 May, the IDF continued battles with Hamas in the outskirts of Rafah, killing multiple of the group's fighters. It claimed to have killed around 30 Hamas fighters since the operation began. Hamas meanwhile fired eight rockets at the Kerem Shalom crossing from Rafah, resulting in one soldier being wounded. Later that day, Joe Biden, the President of the United States, threatened to cut off supplies of bombs and artillery to Israel if it went through with a full invasion, already partially withholding aid.

On 9 May, Israel expressed disappointment with Biden's statements, saying they strengthened Iran, Hamas, and Hezbollah, and that they could not defeat Hamas without invading Rafah. The IDF announced it had killed about 50 Hamas gunmen since the beginning of the operation. It also reported discovering ten tunnel shafts, including a booby-trapped one that injured three soldiers.

On 10 May, the Israeli war cabinet voted to expand the operation. Sources for Axios gave conflicting reports about whether or not the expansion would cross Biden's red line, but all said the cabinet also told the Israeli delegation to continue ceasefire negotiations. Kirby meanwhile stated that Israel's operation had not crossed the U.S.' "red line" yet, although it was watching with "concern" and urged Israel to open up the Rafah crossing for aid. Lebanese media reported that Israel was planning separate small-scale operations in different parts of Rafah so as to not upset the U.S. South Africa again requested that the ICJ impose additional measures on Israel to prevent a full offensive.

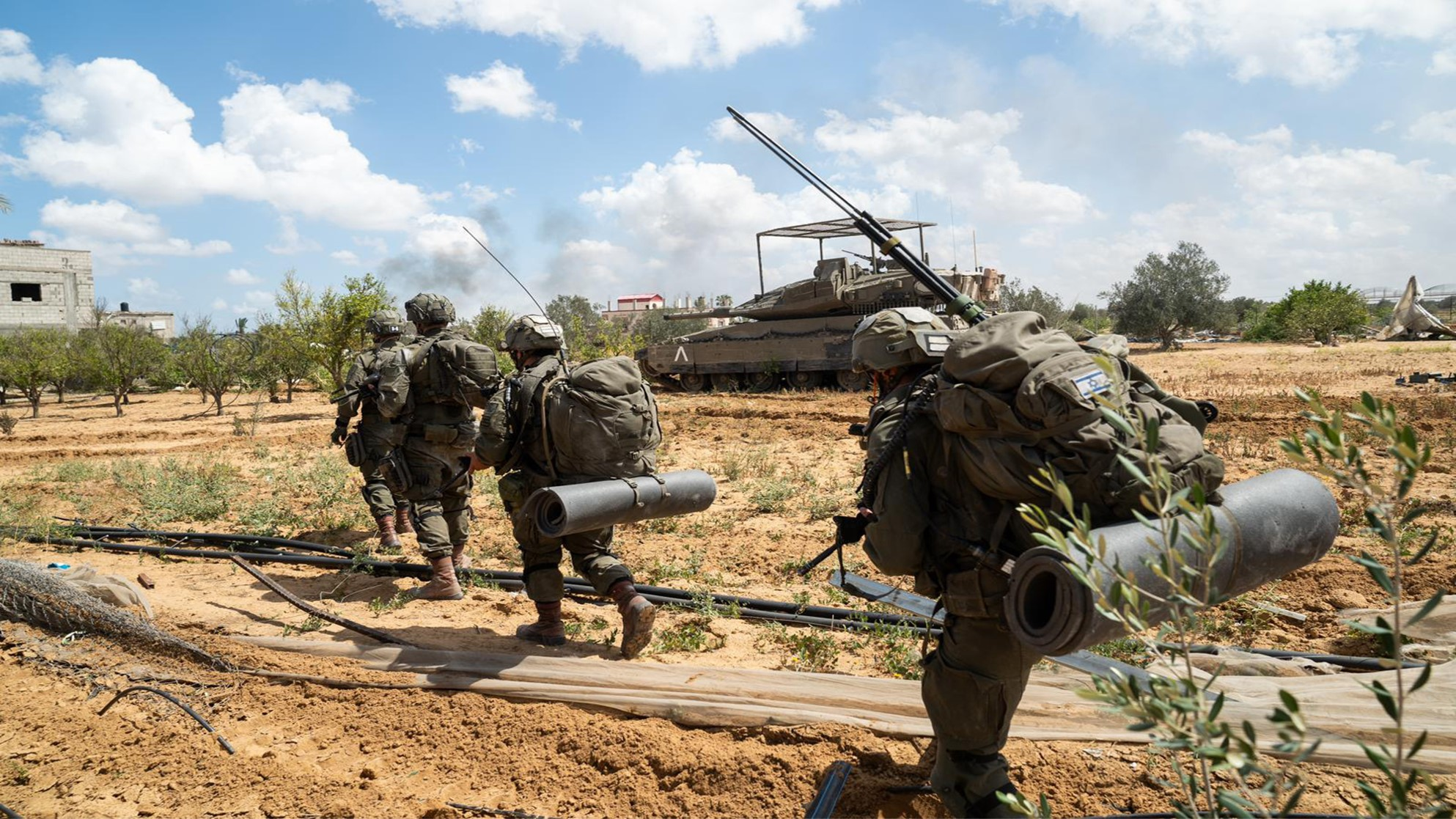
IDF forces in Rafah at 10 May

On 10 May, two soldiers belonging the 9th Battalion of the 401st Armored Brigade were "seriously injured" due to a Hamas attack, while 12 soldiers belonging to the Southern Battalion of the Gaza Division were injured due to wasp stings. The 401st brigade also advanced on the Salah al-Din Road, encircling the evacuation zone. The IDF said it discovered more tunnels in eastern Rafah, struck several sites launching rockets and mortars, and killed several Hamas gunmen throughout the day. Rockets from Rafah and central Gaza Strip were launched by Hamas towards Be'er Sheva, wounding a woman. The World Health Organization stated that an Israeli airstrike wounded a staff member and killed his niece. Ceasefire talks meanwhile broke down after Israel rejected the terms Hamas had agreed to.

On 11 May, Israel ordered evacuation of additional parts of eastern Rafah, in preparation for a further advance. However, the U.S. said it would offer intelligence to locate senior Hamas officials if Israel avoided a full-scale invasion. The offer was part of secret diplomatic talks that had been ongoing to stave off an invasion. The U.S. was concerned about the scale of an invasion, preferring a limited operation with a safer relocation process for civilians. The U.S. and Egypt meanwhile co-operated to find and destroy tunnels located beneath the Egypt–Gaza border. Egypt also refused to coordinate with the IDF at the Rafah crossing. Israel claimed to destroy Hamas tunnel shafts in eastern Rafah, and Hamas attacked soldiers near the Rafah crossing.

On 12 May, Israel claimed Hamas again struck Kerem Shalom with rockets. Hamas and PIJ claimed attacks on the IDF in Rafah, while Israeli tanks struck the area multiple times. Meanwhile, it was reported that Egypt threatened to suspend its peace treaty with Israel if it expanded the offensive, although the Egyptian Minister of Foreign Affairs Sameh Shoukry allayed concerns by saying that the treaty was a "strategic choice" and contained mechanisms for addressing violations. It also announced its support for the South African genocide case. The American secretary of state Antony Blinken stated that Israel had no "credible plan" for safeguarding civilians in Rafah and risked creating an insurgency, while the Israeli National Security Advisor Tzachi Hanegbi said that Israel was taking the U.S.' concerns into account about the Rafah offensive after they were raised by his American counterpart Jake Sullivan.

On 13 May, Hamas stated that it had clashed with the IDF in a street to the east of Rafah. A UN staff member was killed when his vehicle was struck in Rafah while travelling to the Gaza European Hospital. The UN later alleged that it was due to an IDF tank. Per the Israeli investigation, the vehicle did not inform the IDF ground forces while traveling in a restricted area. It was then attacked along with its occupants, first by a tank and then by a drone, contrary to protocols, after ground forces noticed an armed individual inside. However, it stated that it was not clear as to whether the operators of the drone had noticed the UN markings on the vehicle.

Meanwhile, eight soldiers of the Yahalom engineering unit, two Israeli Defense Ministry employees and a contractor who later succumbed to his wounds, were injured when Hamas shelled the Rafah Crossing. Israel also proposed that the Palestinian Authority take part in operating the Rafah crossing. Sky News however reported that the request was rejected by the Palestinian Authority, which conditioned its cooperation on Israel accepting a plan for creation of a Palestinian state by allied Arab countries.

==== 14 May to 21 May ====
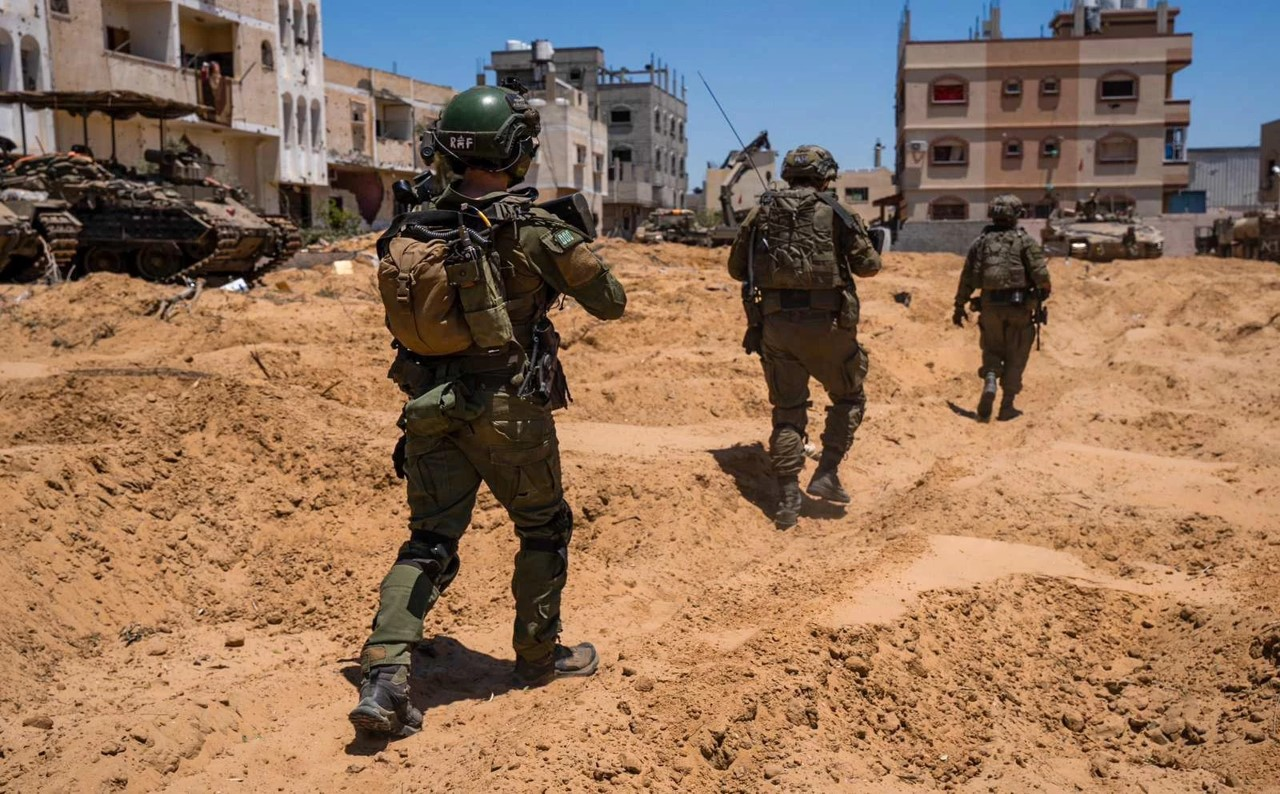
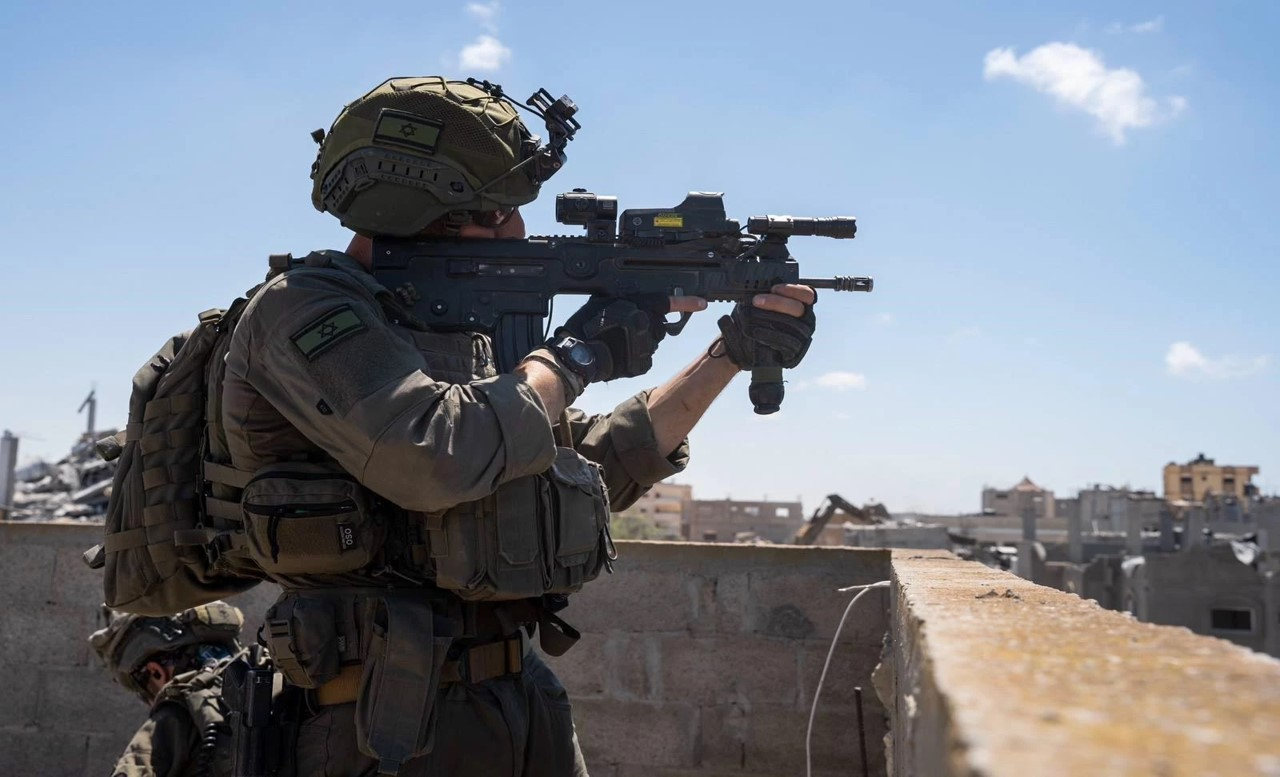
The Givati Brigade in eastern Rafah

On 14 May, the IDF entered the city proper, advancing into the Brazil, Jneina and al-Salam neighborhoods of eastern Rafah. Israel and Hamas intensified clashes, with Hamas claiming to have destroyed an IDF troop carrier in al-Salam, resulting in casualties. The IDF stated that it had killed militants around the Rafah Crossing and eastern Rafah, and destroyed a missile launching site. Six soldiers were wounded by an explosive device, while the IDF claimed to have killed more than 100 fighters and to have discovered ten tunnels since the offensive began. It also released a drone video alleging presence of militants at a UNRWA logistics center. The UNRWA stated that it could not verify the authenticity, content, timing or exact location, but stated that it likely showed a warehouse which had been abandoned by their staff after IDF ordered evacuation in eastern Rafah. Hamas meanwhile stated that the men in the video belonged to the police force protecting aid centres. The IDF meanwhile announced its first fatality of the operation, as a soldier belonging to the 7th Armored Brigade's 75th Battalion was killed. Qatari Prime Minister Mohammed bin Abdulrahman bin Jassim Al Thani stated that Israel's Rafah offensive had lowered the chances of a ceasefire agreement. The ICJ meanwhile said it would hold hearings on the attack throughout the week. The US indicated that it would go through with a long-term weapons deal with Israel, while still blocking weapons it believed could be used in Rafah.

On 15 May, the 162nd Division continued its operations in eastern Rafah, with the IDF stating that the Givati Brigade had raided a Hamas training camp in eastern Rafah, killing several fighters and seizing weapons along with mock IDF vehicles. It also stated that a rocket fired from Rafah towards the Kerem Shalom Crossing struck an open area, without causing casualties. Meanwhile, South Africa presented arguments at the ICJ. It claimed Rafah was the last refuge for Palestinians and requested the court order Israel to pause its operations and withdraw from Rafah. The International Rescue Committee stated that "the scale of the crisis defies imagination". Netanyahu however denied that any humanitarian crisis existed in Rafah, while Blinken stated that the operation had caused a "negative impact". Two Egyptian officials told Reuters that the Egyptian government had rejected a plan from Israel about both countries cooperating to reopen the Rafah Crossing, while it insisted that the crossing only be managed by Palestinian authorities. Israel stated that Egypt was refusing to open the crossing for fleeing civilians.

On 16 May, Gallant announced deployment of additional troops for the offensive, with the Oz Brigade being deployed to Rafah. The IDF claimed that the 401st Armored Brigade with the support of 414th Combat Intelligence Collection Unit destroyed several rocket launchers armed with long-range projectiles, while the Shaked Battalion destroyed another site containing dozens of rocket launchers, including those used in the attack on Be'er Sheva. Satellite imagery showed preparation for two Israeli logistical supply routes.

On 17 May, Israel claimed at the ICJ that it had discovered 700 tunnel shafts used by Hamas in Rafah, including 50 that crossed into Egypt, in order to dissuade the court from ordering a halt to the offensive. The foreign ministers of 13 Western countries signed a joint letter to Israel urging it to call off a large-scale Rafah offensive.

On 18 May, Hamas claimed to have killed 20 Israeli soldiers during clashes in Rafah, while the IDF announced the deaths of two soldiers of the Givati Brigade and injuries to three others due to a booby-trapped tunnel shaft. Separately, a soldier of the 5832nd Combat Engineering Battalion was injured when militants struck his D9 armored bulldozer. The 401st Armored Brigade launched further raids against Hamas in Eastern Rafah, with the IDF claiming that about 50 fighters were killed, while the Givati Brigade claimed to have killed more than 80 militants and seized anti-aircraft guns during the offensive. It also claimed to have killed a senior PIJ member and two Hamas commanders in airstrikes during the day. Israeli media reported that Israel was attempting to persuade the U.S. for allowing an expanded operation. Two people were reported killed after Israel bombed a home in central Rafah.

On 19 May, Sullivan held discussions with Netanyahu during which he called for a targeted operation in Rafah rather than a full-scale offensive. Gallant however stated that Israel was committed to expanding the offensive. The 162nd Division advanced further into Rafah, while the Oz Brigade was deployed into the Brazil neighborhood. The IDF announced the killing of a PIJ commander along with three other members of the group in an airstrike in eastern Rafah, while the Maglan unit located tunnels and militants, and the Egoz Unit found weapons and cameras. Two soldiers belonging to the Rotem Battalion of the Givati Brigade and a logistics crew of the 98th Division were meanwhile wounded. Gaza's Civil Defence stated three people were killed and eight wounded in a bombing on the Tel al-Sultan neighborhood.

On 20 May, clashes continued along the Philadelphi Corridor, while the IDF stated that it had killed more than 130 fighters in the operation, in addition to discovering dozens of tunnel shafts and underground tunnels crossing into Egypt during the day in eastern Rafah. It also stated that it believed that some Palestinian militants had taken advantage of the civilian evacuation, fleeing with them towards the al-Mawasi humanitarian zone. Journalist David Ignatius reported that Israel had agreed to a limited operation instead of a full-scale offensive involving deployment of two IDF divisions in Rafah, after Sullivan met with Saudi and Israeli officials. A U.S. official expressed initial satisfaction with the reported Israeli decision, stating that it incorporated many American concerns and improved Israel's standing in the negotiations with Hamas. American officials also criticized Egypt for preventing aid delivery through the Rafah and Kerem Shalom crossings, as well as mishandling the negotiations. CNN reported that Egyptian mediators had changed the terms of the deal Israel had agreed to, inserting more of Hamas' demands without informing the other parties. Egypt denied the allegations and threatened to withdraw from the talks.

On 21 May, the IDF stated that the Givati Brigade and the 162nd Division had captured three militants exiting a tunnel, seized weapons, uncovered a weapons warehouse, and eliminated 20 other militants over the past day. It later stated that dozens of militants approaching IDF soldiers were eliminated. Israeli tanks advanced into the Brazil, Jneina and al-Salam suburbs, with the IDF stating that it had taken out a militant firing mortars at soldiers with an airstrike, in addition to locating rockets and other military equipment. An Israeli strike on the Yabna refugee camp in eastern Rafah reportedly killed five people, including three children.

==== 22 May to 29 May ====
On 22 May, Israeli tanks reached the westernmost point in their offensive, advancing to the outskirts of the Yibna suburb after heavy clashes overnight. IDF drones bombed Yibna and some fishing boats on Rafah's beach, while Hamas claimed to have struck two IDF troop carriers along the border with Egypt. The IDF announced the deployment of the Nahal Brigade into Rafah, making it the fifth brigade deployed into the city, while troops advanced into the Brazil and Shaboura neighborhoods after a wave of airstrikes. IDF tanks advanced from the Brazil neighborhood towards the Bahlul gas station and the Zul-Nurein mosque, reaching behind the local Bank of Palestine branch and the cattle market of Rafah. The IDF claimed to have reached the outskirts of the Rafah Camp in the center of Rafah, though not advancing into the city centre itself. It also stated that the 401st brigade located and destroyed several armed rocket launchers along the Philadelphi Corridor, while The Wall Street Journal cited an estimation by Egyptian officials about Israel controlling around 70% of the corridor.

On 23 May, the IDF continued its advance towards Yibna, while also advancing in the Brazil and Shaboura neighborhoods. The IDF claimed that the Givati Brigade found missiles and rocket launchers used by Hamas in a graveyard in eastern Rafah, while also eliminating multiple gunmen in the same area over the past week. It also stated that over the past day IDF soldiers uncovered rocket launchers, several tunnel shafts, and eliminated three militants launching mortars with an airstrike. The Institute for the Study of War and Critical Threats Project stated half of Israel's brigades deployed in Gaza were deployed in Rafah.

On 24 May, the IDF intensified airstrikes and shelling on the southern and central areas of Rafah. The ICJ during the day ruled that Israel must halt military operations in Rafah which would risk destruction of its population contrary to the Genocide Convention, and keep the Rafah Crossing open. Four of the five judges who wrote opinions on the ruling stated that it did not require Israel to completely halt the offensive but only prevent genocidal acts, while the sole dissenting judge opined that it required a complete halt. South Africa, the Palestinian Authority and Hamas welcomed the ruling, however the latter two also criticized the ICJ for not ordering a halt on fighting in other parts of the Gaza Strip. Israeli government officials meanwhile rejected the ruling and IDF airstrikes struck the Shaboura camp shortly afterwards. The IDF also claimed to have struck an underground structure containing Rafah Brigades members and several senior Hamas operatives. Egypt and the U.S. meanwhile agreed to allow sending some of the food aid stuck at the former's border through the Kerem Shalom Crossing until the Rafah Crossing was re-opened from the Palestinian side.

On 25 May, the IDF continued its airstrikes despite the ICJ ruling, while clashing with Hamas. The New York Times meanwhile reported that condemnation by its allies had succeeded in causing Israel to "moderate" its offensive, citing IDF officers who stated that it was moving "more deliberately" by reducing the intensity of its attacks with lesser airstrikes and shelling, while also using a lesser number of and smaller bombs, causing soldiers to engage Hamas in close-quarters combat. Several Israeli officers also noted that the four Hamas battalions in Rafah were inferior in training compared to its battalions in the northern parts of Gaza Strip. The IDF claimed to have eliminated Palestinian militants, discovered weapons and destroyed part of Hamas' tunnel system in Rafah. It also withdrew the Givati Brigade from eastern Rafah, while four other units of the 162nd Division remained in the area.

On 26 May, the IDF stated that it eliminated militants, found tunnel shafts, seized a large quantity of weapons and destroyed two rocket launchers that were targeting the Kerem Shalom crossing during the day. Hamas later launched eight rockets from Rafah towards Tel Aviv, the first such attack in four months. The IDF claimed to have shot down three rockets, with the other five landing in open areas. Two civilians in Herzliya were lightly wounded and a home was damaged due to shrapnel. In response, Israeli ministers and politicians called for the offensive on Rafah to continue or be intensified. The IDF later claimed to have struck a rocket launcher located near two mosques and used in the Tel Aviv attack, while also stating that the Givati Brigade had eliminated 30 fighters in the past few days. Gaza's Civil Defense Agency meanwhile stated that it had found six corpses from a house which had been struck in eastern Rafah. The IDF later carried out airstrikes in Tel al-Sultan neighborhood. The attack killed at least 45 civilians and drew international criticism. The IDF stated that it had targeted a compound where Yassin Rabia, the chief of staff of Hamas' fighters in West Bank, and Khaled Nagar, a senior West Bank official of Hamas, were present, while Netanyahu stated that it had made a "tragic mishap" although it was trying to avoid harming civilians. Hamas later confirmed the deaths of two of its members in the airstrikes. An IDF investigation found that the deaths were a result of poor planning and it not confirming the presence of civilians in the tents near the compound, with weapons or other flammable material nearby catching fire after the airstrike.

IDF tanks intensified their assault on eastern and southern areas of Rafah on 27 May, killing eight people. Two medical workers were also killed by a drone while leaving the Kuwaiti Hospital. Meanwhile, a skirmish between Israeli and Egyptian soldiers occurred near the Rafah crossing, resulting in one Egyptian soldier being killed. Both countries accused each other of opening fire first. Reuters however cited Egyptian sources as stating that the Egyptian soldier shot at IDF soldiers who crossed into Egypt while pursuing and killing several Palestinians. The IDF troops fired back, resulting in his death and sparking a clash between two sides which left several IDF soldiers and one Egyptian soldier wounded. i24NEWS quoted IDF sources accusing Egyptian soldiers of firing at the Engineering Corps in Rafah first, resulting in several Egyptian soldiers being wounded while the IDF received no casualties. The New Arab meanwhile reported that seven IDF soldiers were wounded. An Egyptian soldier wounded in the clash later succumbed to his wounds, although the state-affiliated Al Qahera News cited a security source as denying it.

The Kuwaiti Hospital, one of the last functional medical facilities in Rafah, announced on 27 May that it was shutting down due to the Israeli drone strike on its workers on the previous day and the staff members were shifting to a field hospital. The Indonesian Field Hospital was later attacked during the day, causing damage to its upper floors. The IDF continued bombing Rafah overnight and stated that it pursued militants along the Philadelphi Corridor. At least 26 people were killed due to Israeli bombings according to the Gaza Health Ministry. The European Union meanwhile agreed to consider reviving the European Union Border Assistance Mission to Rafah, while stating that it would require agreements from the Palestinian Authority, Israel and Egypt.

Residents told Reuters that IDF tanks and armored vehicles had entered central Rafah on 28 May, reaching near al-Awda mosque whilst soldiers clashed with Hamas fighters around the Zoroub Hill. Witnesses also stated that it had deployed unmanned ground vehicles based on the M113 APC. The IDF however refused to comment on the reports. The IDF also continued bombing the Tel al-Sultan neighborhood. During the day, it claimed that the Nahal Brigade found tunnel shafts, captured weapons and killed many militants. The IDF also advanced in the Tel al-Sultan neighborhood, while deploying the Bislamach Brigade under the command of the 162nd Division into Rafah. The Gaza Health Ministry later stated that at least 21 people were killed and 64 wounded after Israel struck a tent camp in Al-Mawasi, with emergency services stating that the deaths were caused by four IDF tank shells. The IDF denied carrying out the attack. Al Qahera News reported that Egypt, the U.S. and Qatar were trying to revive ceasefire talks. Rafah's field hospitals evacuated to the al-Mawasi area.

IDF tanks continued their probing attacks on 29 May, entering Tel al-Sultan, Yibna and Shaboura neighborhoods before withdrawing to the border with Egypt. Hamas and PIJ claimed to have clashed with the IDF, while also detonating explosives. Three soldiers were killed and three others were seriously wounded during the day. Israel also implemented a communications blackout in some areas of eastern and southern Rafah, while Palestinian health officials reported that Israeli airstrikes wounded several people and caused fires that destroyed aid stores. Hanegbi stated that the IDF controlled 75% of the Philadelphi Corridor. Hamas claimed that it killed seven IDF soldiers during clashes in al-Shawka neighborhood, while another soldier was shot by his own comrades. It also claimed killings of fifteen soldiers in al-Tanour neighborhood. The IDF later declared it had seized complete control of the Egypt–Gaza border, uncovering 20 tunnels used by Hamas, while Egyptian media quoted sources denying existence of tunnels crossing into Egypt. The Palestine Red Crescent Society meanwhile stated that two of its staff members were killed in Rafah. The deputy director of emergency services in Rafah stated civilians evacuating Tel al-Sultan were targeted by Israeli drones. The IDF also stated that it had taken "tactical control" of Tel al-Sultan.

==== 30 May to 5 June ====
12 civilians were killed in central Rafah on 30 May due to an Israeli airstrike when they tried to recover the corpse of another individual. The IDF continued to clash with Palestinian militants in Rafah and claimed to have eliminated around 300 fighters.

On 31 May, the IDF confirmed its presence in central Rafah, stating that it located rocket launchers, tunnel shafts, and weapons while dismantling a Hamas weapons depot. Biden later presented an Israeli proposal for a temporary ceasefire to allow for return of Israeli hostages, both alive and dead, in exchange for Palestinian prisoners, entry of more humanitarian aid, and negotiations for a permanent ceasefire for withdrawal of Israeli forces from the Gaza Strip as well as allowing in material for reconstruction, as long as Hamas abided by the agreement. Hamas later expressed its readiness for the negotiations if Israel announced it would abide by the deal. Netanyahu's office stated that Israel was negotiating for a deal, while insisting on Hamas disbanding its military and administration for a permanent ceasefire. The IDF meanwhile released footage of rocket launchers as well as tunnels it said were used by Hamas to smuggle weapons along the border with Egypt. Residential buildings and public facilities were cleared in the as-Salam and al-Jenina neighborhoods in eastern Rafah.

The IDF continued attacking Rafah on 1 June, shelling the eastern and central areas, while also bombing the Tel al-Sultan neighborhood.

On 2 June, Gallant and Netanyahu's chief foreign policy advisor Ophir Falk maintained that Israel would insist on dismantling of Hamas and release of all hostages for a permanent ceasefire. The IDF meanwhile stated that it was operating in the Yabna camp in central Rafah, with the Givati Brigade killing several militants, locating military infrastructure, weapons and anti-aircraft guns, while the 9th Armored Battalion under its command uncovered several rocket-launching pits along the border with Egypt and the Nahal Brigade called in an airstrike to eliminate a rocket launcher. Egyptian officials met with American and Israeli officials during the day to negotiate the reopening of the Rafah crossing during the day. Two Egyptian security sources told Reuters that Egypt had agreed go the European Union's mission as long as Palestinian authorities agreed to resume operating the crossing.

Shoukry on 3 June 2024 stated that Egypt wouldn't open the Rafah crossing unless Israel withdrew from the Palestinian side. The IDF meanwhile stated that the 162nd Division continued its operations in Rafah alongside the Combat Engineering Corps, using tanks and intelligence information passed on to it. In addition, it claimed that the Maglan and Egoz units eliminated militants at a site being used for operations against the IDF, seized weapons, located tunnel shafts and destroyed military infrastructure, while an airstrike destroyed a weapons manufacturing facility used by Hamas.

Two policemen guarding aid deliveries were killed due to Israeli strikes on 4 June, with a total of seven people killed by Israeli attacks in the preceding 24 hours. On 5 June, the IDF published a video of a 2 kilometres (1.2 mi)-long tunnel along the border with Egypt it had recently discovered, and was purportedly used by Hamas to smuggle weapons, adding that it had destroyed it. Israeli gunboats reportedly bombed the city's coast.

==== 6 June to 13 June ====
Four Hamas militants attempted to infiltrate into southern Israel near Kerem Shalom and Holit during the early morning of 6 June, with the IDF eliminating three of them with drone strikes and tank shelling, while one was believed to have escaped back to Rafah, after they were intercepted by the Desert Reconnaissance Battalion. An IDF officer was also killed in the clash. IDF tanks bombarded Rafah overnight and advanced westwards, reaching al-Izba area near the coastline, while also raiding into central Rafah. Palestinian health officials stated that two people were killed and several others were wounded due to tank shelling in western Rafah. The IDF stated that the Tzabar Battalion of the Givati Brigade had discovered a weapons manufacturing facility during the day, while nearby the Givati Reconnaissance Battalion uncovered a booby-trapped home containing mortars using a drone.

The IDF announced the killing of Salame Muhammad Abu Ajaj, a commander of the General Security Forces of Hamas in Rafah, and Eyad al-Maghari, a Hamas member and the mayor of Nuseirat refugee camp, in an airstrike on 7 June. The 162nd Division continued its operations in Rafah on 8 June per the IDF, with the 401st Brigade raiding a training facility of Hamas' Tel al-Sultan Battalion, killing militants in addition to seizing weapons and locating tunnel shafts. Israeli reportedly fired incendiary bombs in northern Rafah, setting homes and agricultural facilities on fire.

IDF tanks advanced into two more neighborhoods on 9 June, apparently to complete the encirclement of eastern Rafah, triggering clashes with Palestinian militants. The IDF meanwhile stated that the 162nd Division had uncovered tunnel shafts, mortars and other weapons during their raids. An airstrike on a house in Tel al-Sultan killed two people according to Palestinian medics. Palestinian media reported heavy bombardment of Urayba area to the north of Rafah by the IDF overnight.

On 10 June, IDF tanks advanced northwards in Rafah and attempted to advance in the Shaboura neighborhood. The 162nd Division eliminated many militants during the day according to the IDF. Four soldiers of the Givati Reconnaissance Battalion were meanwhile killed and seven wounded in Shaboura when Hamas blew up a booby-trapped building, with the IDF stating that it found a tunnel shaft in the home later on. One of the soldiers later succumbed to his wounds.

On 11 June, the IDF stated that the Givati Brigade had eliminated a militant cell, while seizing intelligence documents and equipment during their raids in the city. The IDF also bombed houses in Rafah during the day according to residents. An Israeli official meanwhile claimed that Hamas had basically rejected the ceasefire proposal, though a Hamas official stated that it has only asked for the fulfillment of its longstanding demands. Hamas and PIJ later stated that they had demanded a full Israeli withdrawal from the Gaza Strip, including from the Rafah crossing and the border with Egypt. At least two farmers were killed, and a communications blackout prevented ambulances from reaching people buried under rubble.

The IDF on 12 June stated that Battalion 890 of the Givati Brigade was operating in Shaboura and had eliminated many militants they encountered over the past week, discovering weapons and a tunnel shaft leading to their underground compound following the clash. On 13 June, Israeli tanks advanced towards Al Mawasi after intensely bombing Rafah overnight according to residents, though the IDF denied bombing inside the designated humanitarian zone itself. Western Rafah was intensely bombarded by the IDF during the day.

==== 14 June to 21 June ====
The Nahal Brigade eliminated militants, located weapons, several tunnel shafts and passages built by militants through walls of houses during its operations on 14 June according to the IDF, in addition to destroying stockpiled explosives they had found, while the IAF took out a hostile drone approaching the Maglan unit. Hamas meanwhile claimed that two Israeli hostages were killed due to an airstrike in Rafah a few days earlier. Five rockets were fired from the Al-Mawasi humanitarian zone according to the IDF, with two falling in open areas in Israel and the other three falling short in the Gaza Strip. Israeli helicopters with machine guns were reported in western Rafah.

On 15 June, eight soldiers of the Combat Engineering Corps' 601st Battalion were killed after the Namer armored personnel carrier they were traveling in was targeted in Tel al-Sultan per the IDF, with Hamas claiming responsibility. The IDF also stated that the 401st brigade had eliminated around fifty militants during overnight clashes in Tel al-Sultan. Al Jazeera Arabic's correspondent reported Israeli forces were burning down homes in central Rafah. The Palestinian Press Agency reported about IDF bombing the Saudi neighborhood in western Rafah, while Oz Brigade in cooperation with Yahalom seized many weapons over the past week in Rafah according to the IDF. Hamas, Al-Aqsa Martyrs Brigades and the National Resistance Brigades attacked IDF forces in the Saudi neighborhood.

The IDF on 16 June announced that it will hold daily tactical humanitarian pauses from 8 a.m. to 4 p.m. along the stretch of Salah al-Din Road from Kerem Shalom border crossing to the European Hospital near Khan Yunis in order to allow delivery of aid, while also stating that it would continue to attack militants in Rafah. Israeli media reported that Netanyahu and the Minister of National Security Itamar Ben-Gvir opposed the decision, and it was made without the former or Gallant being informed about it. Meanwhile, it also announced that a soldier of the Nahal Brigade's reconnaissance unit was wounded, while two other soldiers and an interrogator of the Military Intelligence Directorate's Unit 504 were wounded. Al Jazeera Arabic reported Israeli forces targeted ambulances responding to the death of two people in Tal as-Sultan.

The IDF on 17 June claimed that it had dismantled half of Hamas' forces in Rafah, with the Yabna and eastern Rafah battalions almost completely destroyed, and the Tel al-Sultan and Shaboura battalions moderately dismantled. It also stated that the 162nd Division had gained control of 60–70% of Rafah, having killed at least 550 militants and destroying around 200 tunnel shafts, with control of the city expected to be complete in two weeks, while IDF troops also captured the NPK (Yabna) neighborhood, and discovered hundreds of rockets and many tunnels along the Philadelphi Corridor, including at least 25 tunnels going towards the Egyptian border. Neighborhoods in eastern Rafah were "completely razed" by airstrikes and demolitions. The 401st brigade meanwhile began deploying drones in its operations in the city, with the IDF reporting that it had used them to eliminate militants and a weapons warehouse in Tel al-Sultan. The PIJ stated that it had targeted the IDF's Sufa outpost near the kibbutz of Sufa and its troops in several areas of Rafah, while the National Resistance Brigades stated that they had targeted IDF in Tel al-Sultan with mortars. Philippe Lazzarini, the head of UNRWA, stated that "operationally, nothing has changed yet", following Israel's announcement of "operational pauses" the day prior.

IDF tanks continued their offensive in Tel al-Sultan, al-Izba, Zurub and Shaboura neighborhoods on 18 June, while one person was killed due to IDF's attacks in eastern Rafah per Palestinian health officials. The UN stated that it had been unable to distribute aid from the Kerem Shalom crossing due to fighting and lawlessness in the Gaza Strip. The Washington Post reported that IDF's operation in Rafah was nearly complete and had destroyed 14 of the twenty tunnels it had found crossing into Egypt along the Philadelphi Corridor. The IDF stated that it had severely degraded three of the four Hamas battalions in Rafah. Netanyahu meanwhile stated that he had criticized the U.S. for withholding weapons to Israel while meeting Blinken and was assured that all restrictions on weapons would be removed. Blinken for his part stated that Netanyahu was exaggerating, and the U.S. only withheld one shipment of 2,000-pound bombs for review due to concerns over their use in a densely populated area like Rafah.

IDF tanks advanced further in western Rafah on 19 June, making incursions into five neighborhoods after midnight, while Israeli bombardment on Al-Mawasi killed eight Palestinians and forced people to flee northwards according to medics and media affiliated with Hamas. Palestinian militants meanwhile targeted the Kerem Shalom crossing with rockets. Reuters cited medical sources as stating that twelve Palestinians were killed due to an Israeli attack while awaiting aid from the crossing.

Hamas on 20 June claimed to have targeted two IDF tanks with anti-tank rockets in Shaboura, causing soldiers to flee before being killed by its fighters. The IDF meanwhile stated that two soldiers of the 401st brigade's 46th Battalion were wounded by anti-tank weapons.

IDF tanks pushed into northern and western Rafah on 21 June after having captured the eastern, southern and central areas, with Israeli bombardment causing more people to flee the city. Health officials and emergency workers meanwhile stated that at least 25 people were killed and 50 wounded after Israeli forces shelled a tent camp for displaced civilians near an ICRC field hospital outside the Al-Mawasi humanitarian zone. The IDF stated that it was investigating the incident but had not fired within the zone.

==== 22 June to 29 June ====
The IDF carried out airstrikes and bombardments from the ground on several areas in Rafah on 22 June, forcing Palestinians in the designated humanitarian zones to flee further north in the Gaza Strip. The IDF meanwhile announced the death of a soldier from the Armored Corps' 205th Brigade in an operational accident in Rafah, and also stated that it had eliminated two militants along the humanitarian aid route near the Kerem Shalom crossing where World Food Programme staff were present.

Residents on 23 June reported that Israeli tanks had advanced to the outskirts of the camp for displaced people in the Al-Mawasi humanitarian zone amidst clashes with Palestinian militants. Hamas and PIJ stated that they had targeted the IDF with anti-tank rockets, mortars and explosives. The IDF meanwhile stated that the 401st brigade raided and demolished the Abu Said outpost belonging to Hamas' Tel al-Sultan Battalion, raiding the offices of the battalion's commander Mahmoud Hamdan as well as that of the Rafah Brigade's Rocket and Missile Fire commander Yasser Natat, in addition to discovering a weapons depot and several tunnel shafts. It added that the 401st Brigade also raided and destroyed a Hamas training complex in the area, in addition to locating weapons, tunnels, and intelligence materials.

IDF Chief of the General Staff Herzi Halevi on 24 June stated that the military had nearly dismantled the Rafah Brigade of Hamas and it was no longer capable of operating as a fighting unit. Hamas' deputy chief in Gaza Khalil al-Hayya denied Israeli claims that it was near to meeting the military goals of its invasion of the Gaza Strip. The IDF meanwhile stated that its troops had disabled rocket launchers in Tel al-Sultan, eliminated militants, located large quantities of weapons and destroyed several tunnel shafts during their operations in Rafah.

Israeli tanks advanced further in western Rafah overnight on 25 June, while Hamas and PIJ stated that they had attacked the IDF with mortars in Yibna. Clashes intensified in Tel al-Sultan on 26 June as IDF tanks attempted to advance north, with Hamas and PIJ stating that they attacked them with mortars and anti-tank rockets. Medics in Rafah stated that two Palestinians were killed due to an Israeli missile strike, while the IDF stated that it had taken out a Hamas militant involved in smuggling weapons from Egypt. Four Palestinians were killed due to bombardment by Israeli tanks in western Rafah on 27 June according to medics. A soldier of the Nahal Infantry's 931st Battalion meanwhile was killed in a sniper attack claimed by Hamas.

Israeli tanks advanced further in the Shakoush neighborhood in western Rafah on 28 June. Palestinian health officials stated that at least eleven people were killed due to tank bombardment in Rafah, while the Nahal Reconnaissance Battalion uncovered many weapons in residential buildings during its operations in the city. The IDF on 29 June stated that the 162nd Division killed several militants, while the IAF targeted many sites operated by them and tunnel shafts. Several Palestinians were killed in Israeli operations according to medical officials and residents.

==== 30 June to 6 July ====
Israeli tanks advanced into eastern, central and western Rafah on 30 June, with medics stating that six people were killed in an Israeli attack on a house in Shaboura. Residents of the city accused the IDF of setting the Al-Awda mosque ablaze. The IDF meanwhile stated that its troops killed several militants and destroyed multiple tunnels over the past day. It also stated that the 162nd Division killed several militants, located tunnel shafts and destroyed a mortar launcher, while the Negev Brigade uncovered a tunnel near a UNRWA school and destroyed a rocket launching site containing at least nine launchers.

On 1 July, Israeli tanks advanced in central and western Rafah, while the IDF stated that it eliminated a militant firing anti-tank rockets. Hamas claimed to have lured an IDF contingent into a booby-trapped home before blowing it up, with the IDF stating that a soldier of the Nahal Brigade's 931st Battalion was killed and nine others were wounded. In addition, it stated that the Oz Brigade, the 401st Brigade and the Yahalom unit, while being guided by the Military Intelligence Directorate raided and destroyed PIJ's underground rocket manufacturing facility in Tel al-Sultan, the largest such PIJ facility in Gaza Strip.

The IDF on 2 July stated that the Nahal Brigade ambushed and took out a group of militants heading towards an area IDF troops were operating in, while a soldier of the 401st Armored Brigade's 52nd Battalion was wounded. The ICRC announced that it was transferring its medical team at the European Hospital in Khan Yunis to a field hospital in the Rafah-Mawasi area, after the IDF issued an evacuation order to civilians in an area stretching from southern Rafah to eastern Khan Yunis. Halevi meanwhile stated that the IDF had killed more than 900 Hamas fighters in Rafah, including at least one battalion commander and many company commanders.

Residents on 3 July stated that the IDF carried out new attacks in Rafah amidst clashes and fought Palestinian militants overnight in central Rafah, with Hamas and the PIJ claiming that they had shelled two Israeli tanks and a military bulldozer respectively. The IDF on 4 July stated that it had eliminated multiple militants in Rafah. On 5 July, residents stated that Israeli tanks had advanced into Al-Nasser neighborhood in northern Rafah. The IDF claimed that it eliminated dozens of militants in addition to dismantling multiple booby-trapped buildings in Rafah over the past day.

On 6 July, the IDF bombed a vehicle carrying members of the Palestinian Civil Police Force in Tel al-Sultan, killing four policemen and wounding eight others according to medical officials. Hamas stated that the dead included Fares Abdel-Al, head of the police in western Rafah. The IDF meanwhile stated that its troops had destroyed several underground structures, uncovered weapons and military equipment, and killed several militants during the day. Hamas was reported to have dropped itd demand for Israel committing to a permanent ceasefire and withdrawal from the Gaza Strip.

==== 7 July to 14 July ====
Israeli tanks intensified their raids in central and northern Rafah on 7 July, with the IDF claiming that it had killed 30 militants in clashes and airstrikes over the past day and destroyed a primed rocket launcher, while an officer of the Combat Engineering Corps' 601st and the commander of the 401st brigade's 52nd Battalion was wounded during the fighting. Medical officials meanwhile stated that they had recovered corpses of three Palestinians killed due to IDF's attacks in eastern Rafah. Regarding a possible ceasefire agreement, Netanyahu stated that it must allow Israel to resume the war until its objectives were achieved.

The IDF stated that the 162nd Division continued its operations in Rafah on 8 July, with troops directing airstrikes at militants and eliminating them in clashes. The PIJ and the National Resistance Brigades meanwhile stated that they had attacked soldiers with mortars. The IDF on 9 July stated that it had eliminated dozens of militants in Rafah.

On 10 July, the IDF claimed that the 162nd Division eliminated several militants, located weapons and demolished underground infrastructure. Reuters meanwhile cited a US official as stating that it had decided to resume shipping the batch of 500-pound bombs to Israel it had earlier paused, but were still withholding the 2,000-pound bombs.

Residents stated on 11 July that Israeli tanks continued to bomb houses in western and central Rafah while clashing with militants. Palestinian health officials stated that four people, including a child, were killed due to an IAF airstrike in Tel Al-Sultan. The IDF meanwhile reported a rocket barrage from Rafah towards Israel's border communities in the south, stating that it successfully intercepted five and in response it killed the militants behind it using an airstrike, in addition to targeting areas near the launching site. Hamas published a footage purporting to show it attacking the IDF headquarters in Rafah.

The IDF stated on 12 July that its troops in Rafah targeted tunnel shafts for destruction and eliminated a number of militants, including eliminating three militants near a tunnel shaft by calling in an airstrike after they attacked IDF troops.

On 13 July, Israeli airstrikes struck a displacement camp in al-Mawasi, in an alleged attempt to assassinate Mohammed Deif, the head of Al-Qassam Brigades, and Rafa Salama, a commander of Hamas' Khan Yunis Brigade and one of the people identified as masterminds of the October 7 attacks. The IDF later stated that both Deif and Salama had been killed, with Hamas only confirming Deif's death on 30 January 2025. The Gaza Health Ministry stated that 141 civilians were killed in the attack while 400 others were wounded. The IDF also stated that an IAF aircraft struck a paraglider storage facility in Rafah used by Hamas' Aerial Defense Unit in the morning.

==== 15 July to 22 July ====
Residents of Rafah reported renewed clashes on 15 July, with the IDF blowing up several homes in western and central areas. Medical officials reported that they had recovered bodies of ten Palestinians who were killed due to the IDF's attack in east Rafah. The PIJ meanwhile claimed that it was engaging the IDF in heavy clashes in Yibna. The IDF meanwhile stated that the 162nd Division eliminated militants, with the Nahal Brigade killing a group of militants armed with RPGs, while the IAF struck dozens of targets and militants. The Israeli Navy also provided support to ground forces while bombarding militant infrastructure according to the IDF.

Health officials on 16 July reported that five Palestinians were killed due to an Israeli airstrike on a home in Rafah. The IDF stated that it continued its operations in the city, eliminating militants, targeting tunnels and Hamas military infrastructure. Another Israeli airstrike on a car in the Attar Street in the Al-Mawasi humanitarian zone killed at least seventeen people and injured 26 others. The IDF claimed that it was targeting a senior Hamas member.

Israeli tanks raided northern Rafah before retreating on 17 July, while two people were killed in an Israeli airstrike according to medical officials. The IDF stated that its troops eliminated a militant cell and a launcher used to attack Israeli soldiers. The IDF meanwhile stated that combat engineers of the Gaza Division, the Desert Reconnaissance Battalion and the Yahalom unit destroyed a tunnel in the Rafah area used by Hamas to infiltrate into Israel in June 2024. It also assessed that the Rafah Brigade of Hamas had been mostly destroyed, with all four of its battalions greatly degraded.

Israeli tanks advanced further in western Rafah on 18 July and positioned themselves on a hilltop according to residents. The IDF stated that its troops eliminated several militants and located several tunnels, while Hamas stated that it had bombed IDF soldiers in southwestern Rafah with mortars. Netanyahu made a surprise visit to Rafah, calling Israel's control of the Egypt–Gaza border and the Rafah crossing "essential" in the future.

The IDF clashed with Palestinian militants in central and western Rafah on 19 July according to residents, while five people were killed due to Israeli attacks according to medical officials. Israel was reported to have paused the ceasefire negotiations in order to include Netanyahu's demands of it controlling the Egypt–Gaza border and the Rafah border crossing.

Israeli tanks advanced deeper into northern and western Rafah on 20 July, taking control of a hilltop in the west according to residents. The IDF stated that its troops killed multiple gunmen in Rafah, with the fighting being led by the Givati Brigade and the 401st Armored Brigade carrying out operations against Hamas members and infrastructure in Tel al-Sultan.

Heavy clashes took place between the IDF and Palestinian militants in western and central Rafah on 21 July according to residents, with Hamas and PIJ stating that they attacked IDF troops with anti-tank rockets and mortars. The IDF meanwhile stated that its troops eliminated a group of militants approaching them, in addition to destroying ammunition, tunnel shafts and infrastructure in Tel al-Sultan. Three Palestinians were meanwhile killed in an Israeli drone strike according to a medical official and witnesses.

The IDF on 22 July stated that the 401st Armored Brigade killed dozens of militants in Tel al-Sultan, while the Nahal Brigade performed its last operation in Rafah before being withdrawn; raiding a school near the Al-Mawasi humanitarian zone where it eliminated militants and located a tunnel shaft; destroyed a tunnel, located drills, rockets and tunnel shafts in the Brazil neighborhood; and eliminated militants and located ammunition dumps in Yibna. Israel reduced the size of the humanitarian zone during the day.

==== 23 July to 29 July ====
Residents stated that Israeli tanks bombed many homes in Rafah on 23 July. A soldier of the Givati Brigade's Rotem Battalion was meanwhile wounded during clashes. The IDF on 24 July stated that the 932nd Battalion had found a tunnel shaft, weapons and military equipment in a child's room in Shaboura, while the 52nd Battalion engaged in clashes with militants in Shaboura and Tel al-Sultan, eliminating them. A soldier of the Paratroopers Brigade's reconnaissance unit was meanwhile wounded.

The IDF intensified its bombardment on several areas of Rafah on 25 July according to residents and medical officials, while Israeli tanks operated in northern, western and central Rafah, advancing further in the centre. Several Palestinians were reported to have been injured in Israeli attacks, while the IDF stated that it had eliminated two militants.

The IDF on 26 July stated that the 162nd Division eliminated multiple militants, in addition to locating weapons and tunnels over the past day, while four militants encountered by the 414th Combat Intelligence Collection Unit were killed in drone strikes. An engineering vehicle operator of the Givati Brigade was meanwhile killed after his D9 armored bulldozer was struck by Hamas.

Four Palestinians were killed due to an Israeli airstike on a home in Rafah on 27 July. An officer of the 401st Armored Brigade's 52nd Battalion who was injured due to anti-tank fire on 20 July succumbed to his wounds on 28 July, while five Palestinians were killed due to an airstrike on a tented area in Al-Mawasi.

The IDF on 29 July stated that many militants were killed in Rafah by the Givati Brigade and airstrikes. It also stated that it was investigating the 401st Armored Brigade blowing up a water reservoir in Tel al-Sultan a week earlier with the permission of their commander. The IDF had blown up over 30 water reservoirs in Rafah and Khan Yunis according to residents the head of the water networks of Khan Yunis municipality.

==== 30 July to 5 August ====
At least 20 corpses were recovered by the Palestinian Red Crescent Society on 30 July after the IDF withdrew from some areas in Rafah and eastern Khan Yunis. The IDF meanwhile continued its operations in Tel al-Sultan. The IDF engaged four militias in Rafah on 31 July, with the 401st Brigade raiding military infrastructure used by Palestinian militants in Tel al-Sultan and eliminating multiple fighters. Hamas and PIJ meanwhile targeted IDF troops with mortars and rocket-propelled grenades in Shaboura.

The 162nd Division continued its advance in Rafah on 1 August, while also raiding Tel al-Sultan where soldiers destroyed a booby-trapped building. On 2 August, the IDF stated that the 162nd Division had eliminated around 30 militants in Rafah over the past day.

Six people were killed in Rafah on 3 August due to Israeli attacks according to health officials, while the IDF stated that it had targeted militants and destroyed military infrastructure in Tel al-Sultan and Rafah. A soldier of the 401st Brigade's 9th Battalion was meanwhile wounded due to a sniper attack claimed by Hamas.

On 4 August, residents in northern Rafah received evacuation orders from the IDF as heavy clashes took place in the city. The Nahal Brigade eliminated multiple militants and destroyed military infrastructure with the help of IAF, while the al-Aqsa Martyrs' Brigades attacked IDF troops near the Rafah crossing with rockets. The IDF also announced the discovery of a three-metre high cross-border tunnel located directly beneath a post of the Egyptian Army in the previous week.

Three Palestinian militias attacked IDF troops stationed at the Rafah crossing with mortars on 5 August, while Hamas claimed that it had attacked IDF troops in Zalata, located to the east of Rafah. Seven soldiers of the 205th Reserve Armored Brigade's 9215th Battalion meanwhile were wounded in a grenade attack, with the attacker later being eliminated.

==== 6 August to 13 August ====
Two people were killed in Rafah due to an Israeli attack in Rafah on 6 August according to medical officials, while Hamas claimed to have destroyed two armored personnel carriers of the IDF. The IDF stated that 25 militants were killed in Rafah over the past day, and temporarily closed its humanitarian route for aid to east of Rafah after an RPG attack by Hamas.

The IDF on 7 August stated that the 162nd Division eliminated several militants and destroyed military infrastructure in Rafah. On 8 August, the IDF stated that the Givati and Nahal Brigades conducted raids on sites used by militants in Rafah over the past day, with the Nahal Brigade eliminating militants and destroying military infrastructure in Tel al-Sultan. The IDF also stated that it destroyed several rocket launchers near the border and an officer of the Nahal Brigade was wounded by an anti-tank missile.

Israeli airstrikes in and around Al-Mawasi on 9 August killed ten people, including two journalists, according to medical officials. The IDF stated that the 162nd Division eliminated dozens of militants over the past day, while the Nahal and Givati brigades Brigades eliminated militants, destroyed weapons and military infrastructure. Hamas meanwhile attacked the IDF in Tel al-Sultan with thermobaric rockets.

Three people were killed in Rafah due to an Israeli attack according to medical officials, while the Nahal Brigade eliminated several militants and seized weapons per the IDF. In addition, it stated that a militant group monitoring IDF troops was eliminated by airstrikes, while the 215th Artillery Division attacked militants who participated in the 7 October attacks on Israel. The Al-Aqsa Martyrs' Brigades meanwhile attacked IDF troops near Yibna.

On 11 August, the IDF stated that the Nahal Brigade and the IAF had eliminated two militant cells in Rafah. Palestinian militants meanwhile targeted IDF troops along the border with Egypt, Al Qarya as Suwaydiya, and in eastern Rafah. Hamas also claimed to have targeted IDF troops inside the Indonesian Hospital in Tel al-Sultan.

Two people were killed due to an Israeli airstrike in Rafah on 12 August according to medical officials. while Palestinian militants targeted IDF troops stationed near the border with Egypt, in Tel al-Sultan and eastern Rafah.

The IDF on 13 August stated that its troops eliminated militants, destroyed military infrastructure, rocket launchers, sniper posts, and located weapons and explosives during the day. It also stated that the Givati Brigade had killed around 100 militants during their operations in Shaboura in past days and had eliminated a militant cell. Hamas meanwhile targeted IDF troops in Tel al-Sultan and Zalata. The IDF shut the humanitarian aid route near Rafah after Hamas attacked it.

==== 14 August to 21 August ====
The Nahal Brigade clashed with Palestinian militants and seized weapons in Tel al-Sultan on 14 August, while the National Resistance Brigades attacked IDF troops near the Rafah crossing with mortars. The IDF on 15 August stated that its troops had eliminated around 20 militants in the past few days, destroyed a structure containing a tunnel shaft, and had destroyed 50 tunnels under the Egypt–Gaza border in the past month.

The Palestinian Mujahideen Movement attacked IDF troops in eastern Rafah on 16 August, while Palestinian militants shelled IDF troops along the western part of the Egypt–Gaza border. The PFLP shelled IDF troops in Tal Zoroub to the west of Rafah on 17 August, while the National Resistance Brigades attacked an IDF bulldozer with an RPG in the Saudi neighborhood of Tel al-Sultan. The IDF meanwhile stated that its troops had eliminated several militants and destroyed military sites in Tel al-Sultan over the past day.

The IDF on 18 August stated that the Nahal Brigade had eliminated more than 20 militants, attacked military infrastructure, discovered weapons and military equipment over the past day in Rafah. On 19 August, it stated that troops eliminated dozens of militants, located weapons and destroyed military infrastructure. Hamas meanwhile targeted Israeli tanks in Tel al-Sultan.

The IDF on 20 August stated that an IAF airstrike had eliminated around 40 militants in Tel al-Sultan. Palestinian militias meanwhile attacked IDF troops in Tel al-Sultan, Yibna and Al-Salam.

The IDF on 21 August stated that the 162nd Division had eliminated dozens of militants, destroyed military infrastructure and uncovered weapons in Tel al-Sultan during the day. Gallant meanwhile declared that the Rafah Brigade of Hamas had been defeated and added that over 150 tunnels along the Egypt–Gaza border were destroyed in the operation. At least four Palestinians were meanwhile killed in an Israeli airstrike on a gathering in the Shakoush neighborhood according to witnesses and medical officials.

==== 22 August to 29 August ====
On 22 August, Hamas claimed that it had killed and wounded several IDF troops during an ambush. The IDF meanwhile stated that the 162nd Division had eliminated around 50 militants over the past day in Tel al-Sultan and destroyed military infrastructure, with the Nahal Brigade's 50th Battalion uncovering weapons inside UNRWA bags. An officer of the 401st Brigade's 46th Battalion was killed during the day due to an anti-tank projectile.

On 23 August, the IDF destroyed a kilometre-long tunnel used by militants and stated that the 162nd Division eliminated dozens of militants in Tel al-Sultan over the past day. On the following day, the IDF stated that the 162nd Division had eliminated dozens of militants over the past day in Tel al-Sultan, with the 401st Brigade seizing a large quantity of weapons in the area. The DFLP shelled IDF troops in the Brazil neighborhood on the following day.

On 26 August, two Palestinians were killed by Israeli bombardment in Rafah according to medical officials. The IDF meanwhile stated that the 162nd Division killed dozens of militants, destroyed military infrastructure and located large amounts of weapons in Tel al-Sultan. On 27 August, the IDF in cooperation with the Shin Bet resecued an Israeli-Bedouin hostage named Qaid Farhan al-Qadi from a tunnel in Rafah. Three Palestinians were meanwhile killed due to Israeli bombardment. The al-Aqsa Martyrs' Brigades targeted IDF troops near the Rafah crossing with rockets and mortars on the following day.

On 29 August, the IDF stated that Osama Gadallah, a PIJ intelligence officer who had participated in the 7 October attack on Israel, was killed in an airstrike, while the 162nd Division had also eliminated dozens of militants over the past day. The Times of Israel later cited IDF sources stating that Hamas' Rafah Brigade had collapsed and they had destroyed around 80% of tunnels used by the group along the Egypt–Gaza border. The National Resistance Brigades meanwhile shelled IDF troops in Yibna. An Israeli airstike on the lead vehicle of an American Near East Refugee Aid (ANERA) aid convoy travelling to Rafah killed four armed Palestinians. While ANERA stated that the four had joined the convoy as guards, the IDF stated that it was not informed of their presence.

==== 30 August to 5 September ====
The IDF on 30 August stated that dozens of militants were killed in Rafah by the 162nd Division over the past day. On 31 August, Palestinian militant groups clashed with the IDF in Rafah, while the IDF stated that troops eliminated militants and discovered weapons in Tel al-Sultan. The DFLP shelled IDF troops near the Salah al-Din gate in Rafah, while Hamas and the Popular Resistance Committees conducted a joint RPG attack on an IDF military bulldozer in Tel al-Sultan.

On 1 September, the IDF announced that it had recovered corpses of six hostages kidnapped during the Nova festival massacre, including Hersh Goldberg-Polin, from a tunnel in Rafah overnight, adding that they were killed by Hamas shortly before their rescue. An autopsy found that they had been executed between 29 and 30 August. Subsequently, it was reported that Hamas operatives holding Israeli hostages were given new orders to execute them if Israeli forces approached. Residents meanwhile reported that several homes were blown up by Israeli bombardment. The IDF and Hamas later agreed to a temporary ceasefire of at least eight hours for three consecutive days in the whole of Gaza Strip, in order to allow polio vaccinations.

The al-Aqsa Martyrs' Brigades shelled IDF troops east of Rafah on 2 September. Four women were killed in Rafah on 3 September due to Israeli attacks, while Hamas and PIJ stated that they clashed with IDF troops in the city. Militants also shelled IDF troops near the Salah al-Din gate.

On 4 September, the IDF stated that ita troops had eliminated more than 200 militants in Tel al-Sultan in recent weeks, while locating dozens of weapons and ten rocket launchers intended to be used for firing into Israel. Palestinian militants meanwhile continued shelling IDF soldiers in Rafah during the day, while the PFLP claimed responsibility for attacking them with rockets in eastern Rafah. Polio vaccinations in Rafah began to be administered on 5 September.

==== 6 September to 13 September ====
IDF troops continued clashing with Palestinian militants in Rafah and were shelled to the east of the city by two Palestinian militias on 6 September. On 7 September, the IDF stated that the 162nd Division had eliminated dozens of militants in the Kasbah area of Tel al-Sultan in the past few days. On 8 September, the IDF stated that the 162nd Division eliminated militants, raided militant infrastructure, and located weapons in Rafah during the day.

At least 19 Palestinians were killed and 60 others wounded due to Israeli atrstrikes on a tent encampment in Al-Mawasi on 10 September. The IDF claimed that it had targeted a command and control center of Hamas, and killed three commanders who were Samer Ismail Khadr Abu Daqqa, the commander of Hamas' aerial unit; Osama Tabesh, a commander of Hamas' military intelligence headquarters; and Ayman Mabhouh, another senior Hamas militant. All three were stated to have been involved in the 7 October Hamas-led attack on Israel. It also claimed that all of the 19 killed in the airstrike were Hamas militants. Separately, the IDF stated that Mahmoud Hamdan, the commander of Hamas' Tel al-Sultan battalion who was also involved in the 2023 attack on Israel, was killed along with three other company commanders in a drone strike several weeks ago. It also added that several other commanders of the battalion and militants were killed in separate airstrikes.

A UH-60 Black Hawk helicopter of the 123rd Squadron crashed in Rafah on 11 September while evacuating a wounded combat engineer of the 710th Combat Engineering Battalion, killing two soldiers of Unit 669 and wounding seven other people on board, including four members of the 123rd Unit and three members of Unit 669. The wounded soldiers who had been trapped were rescued by the 489th Search & Rescue "Kedem" Battalion of the Home Front Command. An IDF investigation found that poor visibility caused the helicopter led to the crash.

On 12 September, the 162nd Division commander Itzik Cohen declared that the Rafah Brigade of Hamas had been dismantled and it had taken complete control of the urban area of Rafah. He added that at least 2,308 fighters of the brigade, including more than 250 fighters and the entire leadership of the Tel al-Sultan Battalion, were killed during the operation, while tunnels totaling more than 13 km (8 miles) in length were destroyed and the IDF had discovered 203 tunnels around the Egypt–Gaza border, including nine crossing into Egypt which had been deliberately collapsed before Israeli troops reached them.

The Institute for the Study of War on 12 September separately noted that Hamas' declining attack rate indicated that it had been severely degraded and was not operating any longer as an effective military unit, with its attacks lacking any strategic objectives and its arsenal being depleted of advanced weaponry. It added that Hamas' last attack occurred on 31 August, however smaller Palestinian militias continued targeting IDF, including the PIJ who attacked Israeli tanks in central Rafah on 12 September. It also added that buildings northeast of the Taha Hussain street in Rafah were struck and destroyed during the day, apparently by Israeli tanks.

The chief spokesperson of the IDF Daniel Hagari stated on 13 September that Israeli troops were still battling Hamas fighters hiding in the underground tunnel network of Rafah. Some right-wing Israeli MKs had also criticized Cohen's statement about Hamas' Rafah Brigade being defeated, stating that most of its fighters would still be able to participate in the conflict even if the death toll given by the IDF was true.

==== 14 September to 21 September ====
The IDF on 14 September stated that its troops had eliminated more than 100 militants in Tel al-Sultan over the past few days while uncovering weapons, tunnels, rocket launchers and military infrastructure used by Hamas.

Hamas on 15 September claimed to have carried out a two-stage attack on an Israeli D9 bulldozer and an armored personnel carrier in the al-Janina neighborhood in eastern Rafah, causing casualties among the IDF troops.

Ahmed Aish Salame al-Hashash, the commander of PIJ's Rocket and Missile unit in Rafah, was killed in an Israeli airstrike in the Al-Mawasi humanitarian zone on 16 September according to the IDF. A soldier of the Givati Brigade's 846th Battalion was meanwhile wounded during clashes.

PIJ on 17 September claimed that it had targeted Israeli tanks in eastern Rafah. Three soldiers of the Shaked Battalion and a soldier of the 401st Armored Brigade's 52nd Battalion were killed after entering a booby-trapped building in Tel al-Sultan, while five other soldiers of the Shaked Battalion were wounded. A soldier of the Givati Brigade's 846th Battalion was meanwhile wounded due to a RPG attack in Rafah.

The IDF on 19 September stated that over 300 militans were killed in Tel al-Sultan over the past month by the 401st Brigade and most of the command structure of the Tel al-Sultan Battalion was dismantled, with weapons and long-range rockets also being discovered by the troops. Hamas meanwhile attacked IDF troops with RPGs and explosives in Rafah.

Israeli tanks started advancing further into northwestern Rafah on 20 September, with Hamas stating that it was fighting IDF troops in Tanour neighborhood. At least thirteen people were meanwhile killed due to Israeli airstrikes on Mesbah area. A soldier of the Nahal Brigade's 50th Battalion was injured in clashes. PIJ meanwhile targeted IDF troops with explosives to the east of Rafah.

The Gaza Health Ministry on 21 September stated that four health workers were killed in an Israeli attack on its warehouses in Rafah. The IDF meanwhile stated that the Givati and Nahal brigades killed several Palestinian militants, located weapons and destroyed military infrastructure. In addition, it stated that the Tzabar Battalion of the Givati Brigade eliminated militants attempting to steal humanitarian aid from a truck, and the 162nd Division on 2 September had eliminated two militants who guarded the six Israeli hostages executed earlier.

==== 22 September to 29 September ====
Israeli tanks advanced into western districts of Rafah and took positions on hilltops overlooking the coastal road on 22 September according to residents. Hamas meanwhile claimed to have carried out several attacks on IDF troops in Rafah. The IDF stated that its soldiers had eliminated dozens of militants in the past few weeks, in addition to destroying military infrastructure and tunnel shafts.

On 23 September, Hamas ambushed an Israeli convoy to the east of Rafah. On 24 September, Israeli tanks advanced in northern and western areas of Rafah, clashing with Hamas and PIJ. The IDF stated that the Nahal Brigade killed a militant using RPGs and uncovered weapons in Rafah during the day.

Clashes between the IDF and Palestinian militants continued on 25 September in Rafah, while at least eight Palestinians were killed due to Israeli attacks on homes according to medics. The IDF stated that its troops killed several militants hiding in a tunnel shaft and located weapons. Palestinian militants meanwhile carried out two IED attacks against IDF vehicles to the east of Rafah.

On 26 September, the IDF stated that fifteen militants had been eliminated in Rafah over the past week. Hamas meanwhile fired a RPG at a military vehicle near an IDF supply line to the east of Rafah. On 27 September, a video showing Israeli soldiers blowing up the empty Raed Al-Attar Mosque in Rafah were published on social media. ISW meanwhile reported that the IDF had destroyed buildings in at least three areas of Rafah during the day. Al-Aqsa Martyrs' Brigades and the Abdul al-Qadir al-Husseini Brigades targeted an IDF troop carrier with an IED in al-Janina of 28 September. IDF forces were reported to have blown up several houses in Rafah on 29 September by residents and Hamas.

==== 30 September to 6 October ====
A Palestinian was killed and others wounded due to an Israeli attack on 30 September according to medical officials. Three civilians were killed and two others wounded in the Musbah area of Rafah due to an Israeli airstrike on 1 October according to the European Hospital. The IDF later stated that two Hamas members who had participated in the 7 October attack on Israel in the previous year were killed in an airstrike during the day.

Hamas on 2 October published footage of it attacking IDF troops in al-Tannour neighborhood of Rafah, with its fighters targeting Israeli tanks. The IDF attacked western and southern areas of Rafah on 3 October.

The 162nd Division continued its operations in Rafah on 4 October according to the IDF, with residents stating that they blew up multiple houses. A Palestinian meanwhile succumbed to wounds he had received in a previous bombing on Rafah per medical officials.

The New Arab on 5 October reported that the IDF had built roads and installed military infrastructure along the Egypt–Gaza border, apparently in order to retain a permanent presence. The 162nd Division meanwhile withdrew from Rafah and moved to Jabalia in order to prevent Hamas from re-establishing itself there, handing over the responsibility for Rafah to the Gaza Division.

Three Palestinians were killed due to an Israeli airstrike in Rafah on 6 October according to medical officials. Ynet later reported that the IDF was able to move around the Egypt–Gaza border without facing any immediate threat and the Rafah border crossing had now essentially become its new forward base.

==== 7 October to 14 October ====
The National Resistance Brigades shelled IDF troops at the Rafah border crossing on 7 October. The Israeli Air Force struck a command-and-control center of Palestinian militias in Khirbat al-Adas in northeastern Rafah on 8 October. Palestinian officials mwanwhile stated that eight Palestinians were killed due to an Israeli airstrike targeting a home northeast of Rafah.

The Gaza Division continued its operations along the Egypt–Gaza border on 9 October. The IDF stated on 10 October that a Hamas training complex was destroyed by the Nahal Brigade, who also discovered tunnel shafts, explosives and a dummy tank modeled after Israeli tanks at the site. In addition, it stated that the Israeli Air Force targeted infrastructure used by Palestinian militants during the day, while troops unconvered weapons and explosives.

Hamas on 11 October detonated a tunnel shaft in the Al-Rayyan area to the east of Rafah on an IDF engineering force, while the IDF stated that a tank commander of the 401st Brigade's 46th Battalion was killed during the day. On 12 October, the IDF stated that it had eliminated multiple militants trying to attack its troops, while an officer of the School of Combat Engineering was wounded.

Hamas on 13 October claimed that they targeted two Israeli tanks and a D9 military bulldozer in the Al-Janina neighborhood. Israeli airstrikes meanwhile struck the Al-Rabat mosque in Al-Mawasi and killed four Palestinians in Rafah according to the Gaza European Hospital. Hamas on 14 October stated that it targeted two Israeli tanks near Al-Sirat Mosque in Rafah and triggered explosives in a house IDF troops were entering, causing casualties.

==== 15 October to 22 October ====
The northwestern areas of Rafah experienced heavy shelling on 15 October. Hamas fighters meanwhile ambushed IDF troops in al-Rayyan area, blowing up a booby-trapped tunnel after they entered it. On 16 September, the IDF carried out a drone strike in Rafah against what it said was a militant cell planning to target its troops. Medical sources stated that two people were killed and three others wounded due to an Israeli drone strike on a car in the Soufa neighborhood. Hamas meanwhile attacked an Israeli military bulldozer with a RPG in Rafah, and the National Resistance Brigades targeted IDF troops stationed at the Rafah crossing with rockets.

Hamas' political bureau leader Yahya Sinwar, who was also considered the mastermind of the 7 October attack on Israel carried out in the previous year, was killed in a battle on 16 October, after a patrolling unit of the Bislamach Brigade spotted him alongside two other militants in Tel al-Sultan. The three split after the IDF troops engaged them, and Sinwar fled into a building which was bombed by tanks and a missile. Sinwar was killed with a gunshot to the head. The IDF later stated that they were initially unaware that they had engaged him, and only identified him using DNA tests following his death. The other two militants who had accompanied Sinwar were also eliminated, while an IDF soldier was seriously wounded.

The Gaza Division eliminated multiple militants and destroyed military infrastructure on 17 October. Two mosques were meanwhile reported to have been destroyed due to Israeli airstikes in the Musbah area. The commander of the Tel al-Sultan battalion Mahmoud Hamdan was killed by the Bislamach Brigade on 18 October near the spot where Sinwar, whom Hamdan was also acting as a bodyguard for, was killed two days earlier. Two Palestinians meanwhile died as a result of Israeli bombings according to medical officials.

Warships of the Israeli Navy shelled the coastal area of Rafah on 19 October, while the IDF stated that its troops killed several gunmen and destroyed military infrastructure. The National Resistance Brigades shelled IDF troops near the Rafah crossing on 20 October. The Gaza Division meanwhile eliminated multiple militants in Rafah according to the IDF. Bodies of eight Palestinians were recovered on 21 October after Israeli attacks targeted multiple areas of Rafah according to the Palestinian Civil Defence. On 22 October, it stated that it recovered four bodies in addition to a multiple number of wounded people after an Israeli attack in Khirbet al-Adas.

==== 23 October to 30 October ====
Several Palestinian militants were killed in an airstrike in Rafah on 23 October. Two Palestinians were meanwhile killed due to Israeli bombardment in Khirbet al-Adas. Artillery shelling along al Naseer and Meraj streets, located between Khan Yunis and Rafah, was reported on 24 October. Bodies of two Palestinians killed due to Israeli bombardment were meanwhile retrieved from al-Janina neighborhood, and another was retrieved from the Musbah area. The western areas of Rafah were also targeted by Israeli bombings. The IDF on 25 October stated that its troops eliminated militants and destroyed military infrastructure during the day.

On 26 October, the Gaza Division eliminated multiple militants and destroyed military infrastructure in Rafah, while IDF troops were also reported to be clashing to the west of the city. Israrli military vehicles bombed Al-Mawasi, as well as Shakoush and al-Janina neighborhoods of Rafah on 27 October, while the IAF bombed various areas of Rafah. The IDF stated on 28 October that the Nahal Brigade eliminated multiple militants and destroyed military infrastructure, while an IAF airstrike took out militants in a booby-trapped home. Israeli vehicles were also reported to be attacking east of Rafah. The IDF was also reported to be shelling northwest of Rafah and carrying out airstrikes to the east of Rafah.

The IDF targeted militants in Rafah on 29 October using airstrikes, while the Al-Aqsa Martyrs' Brigades shelled IDF troops in the al-Janina neighborhood. The group also claimed a mortar attack on IDF troops in the area with the Abdul al-Qadir al-Husseini Brigades, while the National Resistance Brigades claimed to have attacked the Israeli soldiers near the Salah al-Din Gate. Paramedics meanwhile stated that IDF troops had also fired towards Al-Mawsai. The Gaza Division continued its clearing operations in Rafah on 30 October, killing multiple militants and destroying military infrastructure.

==== 31 October to 6 November ====
The western areas of Rafah were heavily shelled on 31 October. Paramedics meanwhile stated that IDF troops had also fired towards Al-Mawasi. The IAF struck a building in Rafah on 1 November where Palestinian militants were hiding, while the PIJ targeted an IDF command-and-control centre in eastern Rafah. A number of people were killed and wounded due to Israeli shelling impacting near a mosque in Khirbet al-Adas. An IDF soldier wounded during fighting in Rafah succumbed to his injuries.

The IDF stated on 2 November that the Gaza Division continued eliminating militants and destroying military infrastructure. On 4 November, it stated that the IDF in cooperation had killed Ahmed al-Dalu, a member of the PIJ who was involved in planning attacks on Israeli civilians throughout the war and in the 7 October attack on Israel the previous year, as well as another militant. It also stated that its troops had eliminated multiple militants during the day, including militants in a building where explosives were stored.

The IDF stated on 5 November that its troops located weapons in Rafah and destroyed military infrastructure. Two people were meanwhile killed due to an Israeli bombing in Khirbet al-Adas and another body was recovered in eastern Rafah. Two people were killed due to an Israeli attack in Al-Mashrou area of Rafah on 6 November.

==== 7 November to 14 November ====
Seven people were killed in Rafah on 7 November due to Israeli attacks. The Institute for the Study of War stated on 8 November that satellite imagery indictated that the IDF had expanded its clearing operations in eastern and southern areas of Rafah. A man was killed in al-Shaboura camp on 10 November, while the IDF also bombed the Al-Zahour and Al-Janina neighborhoods. The IDF also stated that the Nahal Brigade eliminated multiple militants, destroyed military infrastructure and discovered weapons during the day.

An Israeli strike on a makeshift cafeteria on 11 November killed at least eleven people in Al-Mawasi. The IDF stated that the Nahal Brigade located a warehouse in Shaboura neighborhood of Rafah used by Hamas to store weapons and as an observation post, with it being later destroyed by combat engineers. It also expanded the humanitarian zone in Al-Mawasi.

A Palestinian was killed due to an Israeli airstrike in Rafah on 13 November. An airstrike on a weapon warehouse in Rafah killed a Palestinian militant on 14 November, while another in Al-Mawasi which the IDF claimed targeted a weapons launcher, killed a child and wounded twenty others according to a paramedic and Wafa.

==== 15 November to 22 November ====
The IDF on 15 November stated that an airstrike struck Palestinian militants in Rafah. Meanwhile, three Palestinians were reported to have been killed due to Israeli attacks. The IDF on 16 November stated that the Gaza Division eliminated multiple militants, destroyed military infrastructure, and uncovered weapons and explosives over the past day in Rafah. Three people were meanwhile reported to have been killed in the Al-Janina neighborhood, and another two in Khirbet al-Adas, due to Israeli airstrikes.

Five Palestinians to the east of Rafah were stated to have been killed due to Israeli bombings by the Gaza European Hospital on 17 November, while the IDF was reported to have raided areas in northwestern and western Rafah and bombed central Rafah. Four people were killed in Al-Mawasi and three people were killed in Rafah on 18 November due to Israeli attacks according to health officials. The PIJ meanwhile targeted IDF troops stationed along the border with Egypt.

Areas east of Rafah and Khan Yunis were targeted by Israeli shelling on 19 November, while the IAF launched airstrikes in central Rafah. On 20 November, three Palestinians were killed due to Israeli attacks in Khirbet al-Adas, while another two were killed in Al-Janina due to a drone strike. Three people were killed in Rafah due to an Israeli attack on 21 November. Meanwhile, the IDF intercepted a rocket fired from Rafah.

Two Palestinians were killed in Al-Mawasi due to Israeli attacks according to medical officials on 22 November, while intense shelling by the IDF was witnessed in eastern and central Rafah. Hamas ambushed IDF troops in Al-Janina neighborhood during the day, targeting soldiers, a tank and a D9 military bulldozer.

==== 23 November to 30 November ====
On 23 November, Hamas shelled IDF soldiers and an Israeli armored personnel carrier in Rafah, causing injuries. Hamas claimed to have targeted IDF troops and a D9 military bulldozer in Rafah on 24 November, causing casualties. The PFLP meanwhile targeted IDF troops along the Egypt–Gaza border with rockets, and the PIJ in cooperation with the Palestinian Mujahideen Movement launched rockets at an IDF base in the southern Gaza Strip.

Four Palestinians were killed in the Musbah area on 25 November due to Israeli bombardment according to medical sources. One person was killed due to an Israeli airstrike in Rafah on 26 November. Also during the day, the PFLP mortarted IDF troops in western Rafah, while the PIJ mortared the troops near the Egypt–Gaza border. The IDF heavily shelled western and eastern Rafah on 27 November.

Israeli tanks advanced further into northwestern Rafah on 28 November according to residents. The IDF also attacked eastern and central Rafah, as well as the Araba area. Two Palestinians were meanwhile killed according to Palestinian sources. The National Resistance Brigades targeted the IDF with an IED to the east of Rafah. Hamas also targeted an Israeli tank and bulldozer in the Al-Janina neighborhood. The IDF bombarded eastern and central Rafah on 29 November, while shelling the Al-Janina area.

The IDF on 30 November published a video of the Nahal Brigade taking out a Hamas cell setting up booby traps through a drone strike in Rafah, while stating that the Gaza Division had recovered weapons and military equipment during their operations near a mosque and a hospital. Palestinian militants meanwhile targeted Israeli tanks and armored personnel carriers in eastern Rafah with RPGs and IEDs, and the National Resistance Brigades targeted IDF troops at the Rafah border crossing with rockets.

==== 1 December to 7 December ====
Four Palestinians were killed in Shaboura camp in Rafah and two in Al-Mawasi due to Israeli bombardment on 1 December, according to medical officials. Three women were killed due to an Israeli drone strike on 3 December. Ten people were later killed due to Israeli bombardment near Mohammed Yousef El-Najar Hospital.

Two people were killed due to Israeli bombardment in Al-Zahour neighborhood of Rafah on 4 December. The PIJ targeted IDF troops in eastern Rafah during the day, while Al-Aqsa Martyrs' Brigades targeted those stationed at the Rafah border crossing. Three Palestinians were killed due to an Israeli attack on 5 December. The National Resistance Brigades meanwhile targeted IDF troops east of Rafah city with mortars.

Three Palestinians were killed in Rafah due to Israeli attacks on 6 December. The IDF meanwhile stated that the Nahal Brigade had destroyed a booby-trapped tunnel, in addition to recovering weapons, explosives, military equipment, hideouts, weapons depots and mortar launchers. It added that the brigade also targeted a militant cell launching mortars at IDF troops. Hamas and PIJ meanwhile targeted an Israeli military bulldozer in eastern Rafah. Hamas also targeted shelled three Israeli tanks in Al-Janina during the day. An officer of 401st Armored Brigade's 46th Battalion was killed on 7 December due to his tank being hit.

==== 8 December to 15 December ====
The PIJ targeted Israeli troops and vehicles in Al-Janina neighborhood on 8 December, in addition to attacking an IDF command-and-control centre in eastern Rafah. They also targeted an Israeli armored personnel carrier in eastern Rafah on 9 December. Two Palestinians were killed due to Israeli attacks during the day, while a video was published on social media showing the IDF demolishing the Al-Istiqama mosque in Al-Junaina neighborhood. Four Palestinians were killed in Rafah due to Israeli attacks on 10 December.

Two Palestinians were killed in Rafah due to Israeli attacks on 11 December. The PFLP meanwhile claimed to have carried out two attacks against IDF troops in the city. Eight people guarding an aid convoy were killed in an Israeli attack near Rafah, with the IDF stating that they were Hamas members attempting to hijack the convoy. Another Palestinian was killed in Al-Mawasi due to gunfire by IDF troops. PIJ meanwhile targeted IDF troops in Al-Janina neighborhood with mortars.

On 13 December, the IDF stated that its troops in Rafah had eliminated militants, located tunnel shafts and destroyed military infrastructure over the past day, while the IAF eliminated a militant cell. During the day, Hamas claimed to have captured three Israeli UAVs in Al-Janina neighborhood, while the PIJ claimed to have attacked IDF troops and vehicles in Al-Janina, and the PFLP claimed to have attacked IDF troops in western Rafah. The PIJ and the Al-Aqsa Martyrs' Brigades meanwhile targeted IDF troops in eastern Rafah with mortars.

A Palestinian was killed in Khirbet al-Adas on 14 December due to Israeli bombardment. The National Resistance Brigades and the PIJ targeted IDF troops in Al-Janina neighborhood using mortars on 15 December.

==== 16 December to 23 December ====
Three people were killed due to an Israeli attack in Rafah on 16 December. The Al-Aqsa Martyrs' Brigades targeted IDF troops in eastern Rafah using mortars. Two soldiers of the 7107th Battalion of the Combat Engineering Corps were killed and two others were wounded due to an unstable building collapsing on them in Rafah on 17 December, while Israeli tanks advanced further towards Al-Mawasi. The PIJ meanwhile targeted IDF troops to the southwest of Rafah.

Three people were killed due to an Israeli airstrike in Al-Janina on 19 December. The IDF shelled northwest Rafah, in addition to attack the area east of Rafah and Al-Janina neighborhood on 21 December. A Palestinian was meanwhile killed due to an Israeli drone strike in Khirbet al-Adas. Three Palestinians were killed due to an Israeli airstrikes in eastern Rafah on 22 December. Five Palestinians guarding trucks carrying aid were killed and more than 20 wounded due to an Israeli airstrike in western Rafah on 23 December.

==== 24 December to 31 December ====
An Israeli drone strike killed a Palestinian and wounded another in northern Rafah on 24 December. On 25 December, a Palestinian was killed due to Israeli attacks in the Al-Biouk area in southern Rafah. Two Palestinians were killed in an Israeli drone attack in the Musbah area north of Rafah on 26 December. A Palestinian woman was killed due to an Israeli attack in the Al-Nasr neighborhood east of Rafah on 27 December.

The Nahal Brigade shifted to Beit Hanoun from Rafah on 28 December, being replaced by the 4th Brigade. PIJ meanwhile targeted IDF troops with mortars near Al-Attar mosque and captured an Israeli UAV, while the Al-Aqsa Martyrs' Brigades targeted them with mortars to the west of Rafah as well. Two Palestinians were killed due to an Insraeli airstrike in the Al-Nasser neighborhood, north of Rafah, on 29 December. The National Resistance Brigades mortared IDF troops south of Rafah on 30 December.

=== 2025 ===
==== 1 January to 7 January ====
The IDF on 1 January stated that the 4th Brigade discovered and destroyed a rocket manufacturing facility in Rafah. Two people were killed and two others were wounded in Khirbet al-Adas due to Israeli attacks on 3 January. On 4 January, two Palestinians were killed due to an Israeli airstrike in the Arab area to the north of Rafah.

Three Palestinians in Rafah and a woman in Al-Mawasi were killed due to Israeli attacks on 6 January. On 7 January, Hamas released footage purporting to show it capturing Israeli UAVs in eastern Rafah. The bodies of two Israeli hostage and two Hamas fighters guarding him were later recovered from a tunnel in Rafah. Meanwhile, three people were killed due to an Israeli attack in the Musabah area.

==== 8 January to 15 January ====
On 8 January, the IDF confirmed that a Palestinian being used as a human shield for an IDF battalion was shot dead by an IDF officer by a mistake in August 2024. A Palestinian was killed in Al-Mawasi due to Israeli bombardment on 10 January. The PIJ meanwhile carried out a mortar attack against IDF troops south of Rafah.

Hamas claimed to have targeted an IDF patrol consisting of 25 soldiers in a building of the Al-Najili area of Al-Shaboura camp, and two Israeli troop carriers who came to rescue them with mines. Four Palestinians were meanwhile killed due to the IDF bombing a vehicle in central Rafah.

Five people were killed and four others wounded due to an Israeli airstrike on a house in Rafah on 14 January according to medics. The National Resistance Brigades meanwhile targeted IDF troops near the Rafah border crossing with mortars. Six Palestinians were killed due to an Israeli attack on the Amer Project to the east of Rafah and another to the north of Rafah on 15 January.

==== 15 January to 22 January ====
Three Palestinians were killed in Rafah due to Israeli shelling on 16 January. A ceasefire between Israel and Hamas went into effect on 19 January and the IDF withdrew from some areas of Rafah that same day according to pro-Hamas media, redeploying along the Egypt–Gaza border. One Palestinian was meanwhile killed in Rafah due to Israeli shelling.

The IDF withdrew from some parts of Rafah after the ceasefire was implemented on 19 January 2025, and retained forces in the Philadelphi Corridor.

Two Palestinians were shot dead in Rafah by the IDF on 20 January, while another person was killed east of the city due to an explosive left behind by the IDF. On 22 January, the IDF stated that it killed a PIJ militant in Rafah.

==== 23 January to 31 January ====
Two Palestinians were killed in Rafah on 23 January due to Israeli tank shelling, with the IDF stating that it had fired towards an armed individual. The newly sworn in US President Donald Trump on 25 January authorized the release of the 2,000-pound bomb shipment which had been paused by Biden over fears of its use in Rafah.

A Palestinian was killed in southern Rafah on 26 January. The Committee of Ministers of the Council of Europe agreed to revive the EU's Rafah border crossing mission on 27 January. The IDF withdrew from the Rafah border crossing on 31 January, handing it over to EUBAM Rafah.

On 31 January, the IDF withdrew from the Rafah border crossing and handed it over to an international force from the European Union. Later that day, the crossing reopened after eight months, allowing sick and wounded Palestinians to leave the Gaza Strip for medical treatment.

==== 1 February to 28 February ====
A Palestinian child was killed in Rafah due to IDF gunfire in the Al-Awda area of Rafah on 1 February, while another Palestinian was killed in the Shouka area to the east of Rafah. A Palestinian was killed in the Badr area of Rafah on 7 February. On 12 February, a Palestinian was killed and another injured due to an Israeli drone strike east of Rafah. The IDF meanwhile stated that the IAF struck a UAV which had crossed into Israel and two militants who collected it in Rafah.

Three Palestinian police officers were killed on 16 February by an Israeli airstike, with the Gaza Interior Ministry stating that they were securing the entry of trucks carrying humanitarian aid into the Gaza Strip. The IDF however claimed that it had struck the three officers because they were moving towards nearby IDF troops.

A Palestinian was killed and four others injured on 23 February after Israeli tanks stationed near the Rafah border crossing opened fire on a civilian vehicle carrying aid. A rocket fired towards Israel from Rafah fell inside the Gaza Strip on 24 February according to the IDF, following which it struck the site from where the rocket was launched and another rocket launch site in Rafah.

==== 1 March to 19 March ====
A Palestinian was killed and another wounded due to Israeli shelling on eastern Rafah on 2 March. On 3 March, at least two Palestinians were killed due to an Israeli drone strike in Rafah. The IDF stated that it had fired at two suspects who were moving towards its troops and posed a risk.

On 8 March, an Israeli airstrike killed two Palestinians in Rafah. The IDF stated that it struck a UAV that crossed into Israel and several suspects who were collecting it as part of an apparent smuggling attempt. A Palestinian woman was killed in al-Shawka, to the east of Rafah, by an Israeli drone attack on 11 March.

An Israeli airstrike killed three Palestinian men in Rafah on 17 March. Their family members stated that they were civilians, while the IDF stated that it had targeted militants. Five Palestinians were killed in the Musbah area on 19 March.

==== 20 March to 27 March ====
On 20 March, Israel began ground operations in the Shaboura camp. Nine Palestinians were killed due to Israeli airstrikes in Rafah on 22 March. On 23 March, the IDF ordered an evacuation for Tel al-Sultan after encircling the neighborhood overnight. Salah al-Bardawil, a senior leader in Hamas' political bureau, was killed alongside his wife in an Israeli airstrike on a camp in Al-Mawasi.

The Palestine Red Crescent Society (PRCS) stated that nine of its members went missing in Tel al-Sultan on 23 March after the IDF opened fire on their vehicles, which the IDF admitted, stating that they were being used by Hamas and PIJ. The body of one PRCS member was discovered later. The Palestinian Civil Defence in Gaza also stated that six of its members went missing in the same incident.

Israeli military sources stated on 24 March that the IDF had killed around 20 militants and captured around 30 of them in Tel al-Sultan following resumed operations, in addition to raiding a Hamas command center in the neighborhood. The IDF meanwhile stated that it accidentally struck a building belonging to the International Committee of the Red Cross due to incorrect identification.

Two Palestinians were killed due to Israeli attacks in Rafah on 26 March. A Palestinian was killed and many others wounded due to an Israeli airstrike near the Al-Mashrou' Roundabout in eastern Rafah on 27 March.

==== 28 March to 3 April ====
Two Palestinians were killed due to Israeli shelling of Al-Shawka in eastern Rafah. On 29 March, Israel expanded its operation in Rafah to al-Jnina neighborhood, with the IDF stating that it demolished military infrastructure used by Palestinian militants during the day. A girl was meanwhile killed due to an Israeli attack on Shaboura camp. On 30 March, the Palestine Red Crescent Society stated that it recovered bodies of eight of its members, six of Gaza's Palestinian Civil Defence, and one of a UN employee from a mass grave. On 31 March, the IDF told residents of Rafah to evacuate to Al-Mawasi.

A Palestinian was later killed and another wounded in Rafah. The IDF meanwhile claimed that it had killed more than 50 militants since the resumption of its operation. On 1 April, three Palestinians died and several others were injured due to an Israeli airstrike in Rafah, while another wounded Palestinian succumbed to his wounds sustained in an earlier attack.

Israeli Defense Minister Israel Katz on 2 April announced the expansion of the IDF's ground operation in the Gaza Strip, while Netanyahu declared that it would seize the Morag Axis between Khan Yunis and Rafah to establish the Morag Corridor. The IDF stated that it had completed encirclement of Tel al-Sultan and had eliminated dozens of militants. It also deployed the 36th Division into Rafah. Eleven Palestinians were meanwhile killed due to Israeli attacks on Rafah during the day.

On 3 April, the IDF advanced into Rafah as hundreds of thousands of Palestinians fled the city, while an airstrike on the main road between Khan Yunis and Rafah cut off most movement between the two cities.

==== 4 April to 12 April ====
The UN stated on 4 April that 65% of Rafah had been turned into no-go zones by the IDF. A Palestinian was killed and several others wounded due to an Israeli bombing in northeast of Rafah on 5 April.

On 9 April, the IDF stated that it discovered several tunnel shafts in Tel al-Sultan, while also advancing in the Morag Corridor area where it uncovered and destroyed infrastructure and tunnels being used by Hamas, in addition to eliminating several militants. Doron Kadosh, the military correspondent of Israeli Army Radio who visited Rafah, stated that little to no fighting had occurred since the offensive resumed. Israeli media also reported that two Hamas battalions in Rafah were still intact.

The IDF stated on 11 April that two soldiers were wounded in Rafah, and Ahmad Iyad Muhammad Farhat, the commander of the sniper forces of the Tel al-Sultan Battalion, was killed, while it advanced along the Morag Corridor. The IDF also stated that its troops killed several militants, and demolished booby-trapped buildings, military infrastructure, and a Hamas tunnel beneath a kindergarten. On 12 April, the IDF said that it had completed encircling Rafah as the 36th Division had completed the seizure of Morag Corridor overnight.

==== 13 April to 30 April ====
On 13 April, Hamas stated that it blew up a booby-trapped building in eastern Rafah after IDF troops entered it. On 17 April, an Israeli drone attack killed a Palestinian and wounded two others in the Shakoush area. The IDF meanwhile stated that the Golani Brigade destroyed a Hamas training camp in the Morag Corridor area during the day. On 18 April, a girl was killed due to Israeli shelling on Al-Nasr neighborhood. On 19 April, two Palestinians were killed due to Israeli shelling in Al-Nasr neighborhood.

On 20 April, Israeli shelling killed a Palestinian in Al-Mawasi and five Palestinians near the Kaf Sufa area east of Rafah. On 21 April, a Palestinian civilian was killed due to Israeli shelling on the Al-Shakoush area, while five Palestinians were killed in Al-Mawasi. On 25 April, the IDF stated that three soldiers were wounded in a RPG attack on a Humvee in Tel al-Sultan, following which the IAF carried out airstrikes on the area. Hamas later claimed that it had killed and wounded a number of Israeli soldiers after ambushing four Humvees and a military truck.

The Israeli Public Broadcasting Corporation reported on 26 April that the IDF was setting up a humanitarian zone in Rafah. On 27 April, the IDF stated that the 205th Brigade uncovered weapons hidden in UNRWA humanitarian aid bags by Hamas in Tel al-Sultan, in addition to destroying military infrastructure, eliminating multiple Hamas militants and dismantled several booby-trapped houses. A Palestinian child was meanwhile killed due to an Israeli drone strikes in Al Mawasi.

The IDF announced on 28 April that the 282nd Artillery Brigade had used the "Bar" rocket in its operations, the first such operational use of the rocket. It also stated that its troops had fired more than 5,000 shells so far at the Morag Corridor. A PRCS worker who went missing after the IDF killed 15 rescue workers in Tel al-Sultan on 23 March, was released by the military on 29 April.

==== 1 May to 7 May ====
On 1 May, three Palestinian civilians were killed due to an Israeli drone attack on Al-Mawasi. On 4 May, the IDF stated that two soldiers of the Yahalom unit were killed and two others were wounded due to an explosion in a booby-trapped tunnel in Rafah. Hamas later stated that it had carried out an ambush on IDF engineering troops a day earlier in al-Janina neighborhood, killing and wounding many of them. It also claimed to have blown up a booby-trapped building in the same area, killing and wounding many IDF soldiers.

On 6 May, IDF captured Hamas militants who surrendered in the Shaboura neighborhood, including Yousef Qadi, a platoon commander who was involved in the 7 October attack on Israel in 2023 and kept several Israeli hostages captive, and Muhammad Zaarab, commander of a sniper unit.

On 7 May, Hamas claimed to have killed and wounded IDF troops near Al-Mashrou' Junction to the east of Rafah. The IDF later stated that four soldiers were injured due to an explosive device in Rafah, including two each of a Golani reconnaissance unit and the Oketz Unit.

==== 8 May to 26 May ====
Hamas stated on 8 May that heavy clashes were ongoing with the IDF, later stating that it ambushed a group of Israeli soldiers in al-Tannour neighborhood, killing and wounding several of them. The IDF stated on the following day that two soldiers were killed and six others were wounded in Rafah. It also added that two Hamas militants surrendered to them and provided information regarding a major tunnel, which was later destroyed.

On 10 May, the IDF claimed that Palestinian militants in Rafah were nearing defeat and clashes were now only taking place in the Janina neighborhood. It also stated that its troops destroyed infrastructure used by the militants both above and below the ground. A Palestinian child was meanwhile killed due to Israeli firing in the northern coastal area of Rafah, while two Palestinians were injured due to Israel shelling in the west of the city. The IDF stated on 31 May that it had killed the Rafah Brigade commander Muhammad Shabana alongside Hamas' Gaza Strip leader Mohammed Sinwar in airstrikes on the premises of the Gaza European Hospital on 13 May. Hamas confirmed Mohammed Sinwar's death in August 2025.

Hamas published a video on 14 May of it carrying out two attacks on IDF troops in al-Tanour neighborhood, adding that it killed and wounded several of them. Four Palestinians were killed in Israeli airstrikes on Rafah on 16 May. A group consisting of three Italian MEPs and representatives of various NGOs held a protest at the Egyptian side of the Rafah crossing on 18 May, calling on Israel to stop its war on Gaza Strip and to allow aid through the crossing, in addition to calling for a weapons embargo on Israel. On 19 May, the IDF stated that it destroyed the tunnel used by Hamas to attack its soldiers on 3 May, and killed multiple militants who were hiding inside it.

On 24 May, seven Palestinians were killed and over 60 others were wounded due to Israeli bombing on a civilian gathering west of Rafah. On 26 May, the IDF reissued its wide evacuation warning for Rafah and Khan Yunis, telling residents to evacuate to Al-Mawasi due to an upcoming offensive. The IDF later stated that the 36th Division was advancing into Khan Yunis after having completed its operations in Rafah, eliminating dozens of militants and destroying hundreds of buildings over the past week. The Gaza Humanitarian Foundation meanwhile stated that it had begun distributing aid to Palestinians in Rafah.

== Humanitarian impact ==
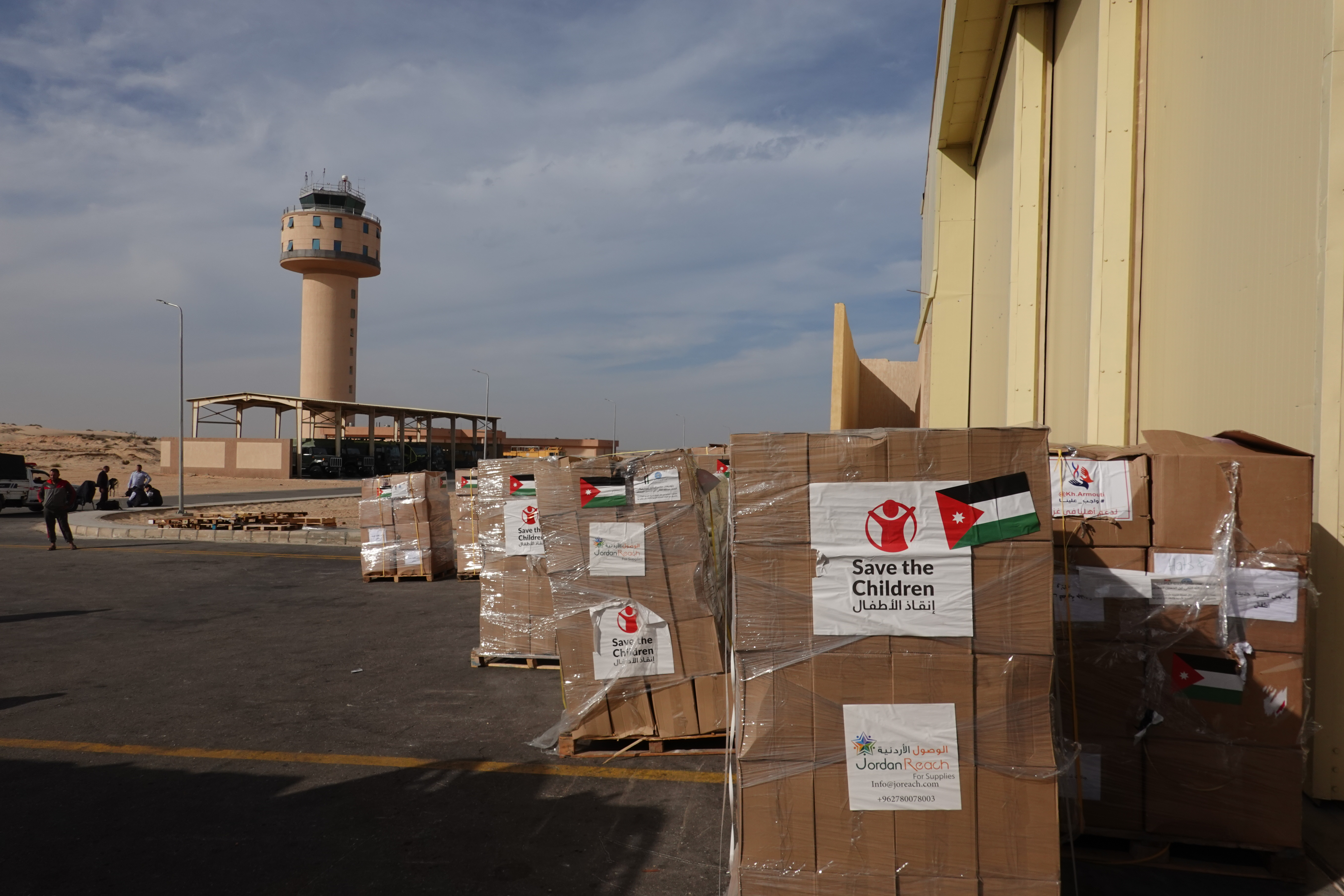
Aid entering Rafah through Egypt

Approximately 150,000 people resided in the area of eastern Rafah that Israel initially ordered evacuated. When Israel ordered the evacuation, it extended the al-Mawasi "humanitarian zone" to other parts of central Gaza and Khan Yunis. Israel said the zone comprised field hospitals, tents, and enhanced provisions of food, water, medicine, and other essential supplies. However, Palestinians and aid groups say that designated safe zones have previously been bombed by the Israeli military. Refugees in the area also warned that the area was overcrowded and still lacking supplies. UN and European officials said the safe zone was neither safe nor properly equipped and warned that the order to evacuate Rafah may amount to a war crime. Hospital records showed at least 25 people were wounded in areas not under evacuation orders. A Rafah resident said Israel bombed the zone during the offensive. The village of Al Qarya as Suwaydiya was meanwhile wiped out during the offensive.

Four days later, UNRWA reported that 80,000 people had left the area. Israeli army sources estimated that 150,000 people had fled, and The Guardian reported that more than 100,000 people fled. During the second evacuation, Israel ordered people to evacuate from adjacent areas of eastern Rafah. By then, around 300,000 people had fled the area, with officials estimating as many as 500,000 people have been displaced. By 28 May, over 1 million people were estimated to have been displaced from Rafah by the UNRWA.

Because of events relating to the offensive, Israel temporarily closed Kerem Shalom and Rafah crossings, both key for aid into Gaza. Aid agencies said the closures worsened the ongoing humanitarian crisis. The UN called for the crossings to be reopened immediately. Israel re-opened the Kerem Shalom crossing on 8 May, but Blinken said that aid was not getting through. On 14 May, the Palestine Red Crescent Society stated that famine was imminent because of the closure of the Rafah crossing. Israel denied the UN access to the crossings. On 21 May, the UN stated it had run out of supplies and was ceasing food distribution in Rafah, warning of the possible failure of the Gaza temporary pier. On 24 May, the ICJ ruled that Israel must re-open the Rafah crossing.

The offensive took a toll on hospitals in Rafah. On 8 May, the World Health Organization said that south Gaza hospitals only had three days left of fuel due to the closures. On 14 May, the European Hospital announced it would shortly go out of service due to the fuel shortage. The Kuwaiti and Abu Yousef Al Najjar hospitals were ordered to evacuate during the second evacuation. Hospital director Marian Hams stated that Israel targeted hospitals and that they threatened staff with death if they did not vacate. On the same day, Doctors Without Borders was forced to leave the Indonesian Hospital because of Israeli bombing. Medics have warned that all healthcare in Rafah was at risk because of the offensive. Wounded people were prevented from leaving Gaza for medical treatment when the Rafah crossing was closed. American doctors were reportedly trapped in hospitals due to the offensive. Ambulances and rescue teams struggled to rescue people injured in confrontation zones.

At the end of May 2024, the United Nations stated that humanitarian aid supply flows had dropped 67 percent since the start of the offensive at the beginning of the month. In mid-June 2024, the head of the World Health Organization stated Israel's offensive had "severely crippled" health operations, with the last medical facility in Rafah increasingly difficult to reach. In late-June 2024, the WHO stated that at least 2,000 patients were estimated to be unable to leave the Gaza Strip due to the closure of the Rafah crossing since the offensive began.

In July 2024, foreign reporters were allowed to enter Rafah for the first time since the start of the offensive, describing the city as a "flattened wasteland" and "unrecognizable". The International Committee of the Red Cross on 18 July stated that its field hospital in Rafah had reached the breaking point of its response capacity. The Hamas government stated in April 2025 that about 90% of residential areas and 85% of the sewage network of Rafah had been destroyed in the IDF's offensive.

== Casualties ==
After the initial Israeli strikes, the Kuwaiti Hospital in Rafah reportedly received 27 dead and 150 wounded people. Israeli media reported that more than 30 people died in the airstrikes. Medics reported sixteen people killed in two airstrikes, including nine from one family and seven from another. CNN reported that of the dead, 6 were women and 9 were children. Al Jazeera English reported the "nonstop bombing of residential houses". By June 2024, rescue teams were reportedly unable to reach wounded people in Rafah.

More than 35 civilians were killed and nearly 130 people were injured on 7 May. 19 people, including five children and a woman, were killed on 8 May. 15 civilians were killed and 5 injured on 9 May. On 10 May, 1 Israeli civilian was injured by Hamas rocket fire from central Gaza and Rafah, 1 Palestinian was killed and one child injured. 9 civilians were killed on 11 May. Multiple civilians and a UN staff member were killed in intensified airstrikes on 13 May. 5 civilians were killed on 15 May. 4 civilians were killed in central Rafah on 16 May. 3 civilians were killed on 18 May. 9 people were killed on 19 May, including six children and two women. 24 people were killed on 20 May, including sixteen children and six women. 18 people were killed on 21 May. 13 people were killed in the 48 hours after 24 May ICJ ruling.

On 26 May, Israel bombed a displacement camp in Rafah, reportedly killing 35-45 people and wounding 60, while targeting two Hamas commanders. Israel claimed it carried out a "precise" strike on a Hamas compound, and that a fire possibly harmed several civilians nearby. Survivors of the attack claimed it burned people alive and destroyed an entire block. The bombing was described as a massacre by Palestinian officials. On 30 May, Save the Children stated that 66 people had been killed in safe zones over a four-day period.

Medics warned that thousands of civilians could die in the offensive. The UN warned the Israeli offensive risked killing hundreds of thousands of people.

On 25 July, Israeli Prime Minister Benjamin Netanyahu said "practically none" of the civilians had been killed in Israel's Rafah offensive, except the 45 killed in the Tel al-Sultan attack. CNN pointed out that in that week alone, Israeli attacks on displacement camps in Rafah had killed 29. CNN had also spoken to health officials, humanitarian workers and eyewitnesses who corroborated evidence of further civilian casualties.

=== Combatant casualties ===
Also on 25 July, Netanyahu said Israel killed 1,203 "terrorists". Al Jazeera pointed out that Netanyahu did not offer any evidence, and doubted whether those described as "terrorists" were indeed individuals belonging to armed groups. Misbar pointed to earlier investigations, including one by the BBC, that raised concerns that Israeli death tolls classify civilian government officials (e.g. administrators) as "fighters".

In September 2024, the IDF stated that at least 2,308 Hamas fighters had been killed. In the same month, the IDF stated it had killed an overall 17,000 fighters in Gaza since the beginning of the war. However, ACLED examined "detailed IDF reports on the killing of militants" and found they added up to only 8,500 militants. ACLED also raised concerns that IDF casualty counts may not distinguish between Hamas combatants and civilians nearby.

== Razing of Rafah ==
A feature of the Rafah offensive is the systematic razing of Rafah by the IDF. The razing of Rafah has been mostly carried out by bulldozing and controlled demolitions of buildings, rather than by aerial bombardment.

In April 2024, after months of war but before the start of the Rafah offensive and the razing operations, 34% of buildings in Rafah were damaged to some degree, a lower percentage than in other cities of the Gaza Strip. Razing of Rafah took place until the January 2025 ceasefire, erasing large areas of the city. In early April 2025, following the breakdown of the ceasefire the previous month, the IDF moved in to demolish those neighborhoods of Rafah (and many neighborhoods of the wider Rafah Governorate) that were not destroyed before the ceasefire, with a large new area razed during the course of not more than a few weeks in April–May 2025.

In January 2025, France24 reported that about 74% of Rafah's buildings had been damaged or destroyed.

One analysis indicates that 89% of buildings in Rafah (unclear if it means the city or the entire governorate) have been either destroyed or partially damaged enough to make them uninhabitable; however, satellite and aerial imagery mostly shows a landscape of flattened buildings, with partial damage being less common. According to maps published by the New York Times, as of mid-May 2025, there were parts of the Rafah metropolitan area, including at least one "island" within the razed area, where complete razing did not occur.

While the vast majority of the city of Rafah is now a razed area, satellite imagery shows destruction beyond Rafah's city limits, impacting multiple towns and refugee camps-turned-towns that surround Rafah.

== Aftermath ==
About 200 Hamas fighters remained holed up in Rafah by November 2025. US and Egyptian negotiators proposed that they would be allowed a safe passage out of Rafah in exchange for surrendering their arms under the Gaza peace plan. Hamas however rejected this offer.

On 30 November 2025, the IDF killed Mohammed Bawab, the commander of Hamas' Eastern Rafah battalion, along with his deputy Ismail Abu Labda who helped plan the 7 October attacks. The Popular Forces militia announced on 4 December 2025 that its leader Yasser Abu Shabab was killed while attempting to settle a dispute, and denied claims that he had been killed by Hamas. The IDF meanwhile stated that it had killed around 40 Hamas fighters trapped in tunnels underneath Rafah.

On 17 January 2026, the IDF stated that it killed Muhammad Khuli, the head of operations in Hamas' Central Camps Brigade who had masterminded the attack on the Nahal Oz border crossing in 1995. A commander of the Eastern Rafah battalion was captured on 30 January. The Rafah border crossing was reopened by the IDF on 2 February 2026 as part of the Gaza peace plan.

The new Rafah Brigade commander Na'el Abu Obeid was killed in a drone strike in Al-Mawasi on 15 September 2026. His successor Samir Mahmoud Abu Younis, who had also helped plan the October 7 attack, was killed by a drone strike in Al-Mawasi as well on 14 November 2026.

== International reactions ==
=== Africa ===
- South Africa: The country urged the ICJ to consider action on Israel's planned offensive. In a statement, South African foreign minister Naledi Pandor stated, "South Africa is totally horrified at what is continuing to happen to the people of Gaza, the West Bank, and now Rafah. We believe this confirms the allegation tabled before the ICJ that genocide is under way in the Palestinian territories". When Israel ordered the evacuation of eastern Rafah, the country said it was 'deeply disturbed' and said Israel's operations were illegal.

=== Americas ===
- Brazil: After the Israeli forces seized the Rafah crossing on 7 May, the Brazilian foreign ministry condemned the offensive.
- Canada: The country called for a ceasefire in a joint statement with Australia and New Zealand, which stated "We are gravely concerned by indications that Israel is planning a ground offensive into Rafah. A military operation into Rafah would be catastrophic." Foreign Minister Melanie Joly had previously (Note: On 11 February) stated that Canada was "deeply concerned" about an Israeli invasion of Rafah. The Canadian Minister of Foreign Affairs said that any full-scale invasion of Rafah would be 'completely unacceptable'.
- Mexico: The Mexican government condemned the assaults in Rafah, saying that attacks on civilians represent a "serious violation of international humanitarian law" and calls for an "immediate humanitarian ceasefire".
- United States: The United States, Israel's largest military supplier, did not approve of plans to invade. An offensive in Rafah under the IDF plan became a supposed red line for the Biden administration, causing a rift in relations between the U.S. and Israel. Nonetheless, on 29 March 2024, Joe Biden authorized the transfer of billions of dollars in bombs and fighter jets to Israel to replenish Israel's military. Biden opposed "any forced displacement of Palestinians in Gaza" and reaffirmed his stance that Israel should not continue with the military assault on Rafah "without a credible and executable plan" to ensure the safety of civilians. Initially, three U.S. officials told Politico in February 2024 that Israel would not face consequences from the United States if they were to invade Rafah and kill civilians. By March 2024, however, unnamed U.S. officials told Politico that Biden would consider conditioning military aid to Israel if it were to invade Rafah. On 5 May, when the U.S. expected Israel to invade, the U.S. put a hold on a shipment of ammunition. Biden threatened to cut off Israel's supply of bombs and artillery if it went through with an invasion. On 14 May, the Biden administration informed Congress of their planned new $1 billion sale of arms and ammunition to Israel; despite once pausing shipment of bombs to Israel, the Biden administration re-affirmed their commitment to militarily support Israel overall.

=== Asia ===
- China: The Ministry of Foreign Affairs of the People's Republic of China stated, "China follows closely the developments in the Rafah area, opposes and condemns actions that harm civilians and violate international law" and demanded Israel "stop its military operation as soon as possible".
- Indonesia: The Indonesian Ministry of Foreign Affairs stated that Indonesia strongly condemns the Israeli military attack in the Palestinian city of Rafah, stating "Any attempt at forced transfer or displacement of Palestinians, including from Rafah are unacceptable as it amounts to an ultimate crime against humanity". Indonesia reiterates its call for an immediate and permanent cease-fire, and urges the international community in particular the Security Council must stop "Israel's brutal atrocities" immediately.
- Japan: The Ministry of Foreign Affairs released a statement that it was deeply concerned about an Israeli military operation in Rafah, stating, "It is crucial to improve the humanitarian situation as soon as possible".
- South Korea: The foreign ministry expressed deep concern over Israel's plans and urged for the protection of civilians under international laws.
- Malaysia: According to a statement from the Ministry of Foreign Affairs, "Malaysia vehemently condemns the latest attacks by Israel on Rafah [...] and the attacks only demonstrate Israel's intransigence and unwillingness to work for peace. The Israeli regime is bent on pursuing genocide and a war of extermination against the besieged Palestinians. As such, Israel deserves the strongest condemnation from the international community."

=== Europe ===
- European Union: Foreign policy chief Josep Borrell stated, "Reports of an Israeli military offensive on Rafah are alarming. It would have catastrophic consequences worsening the already dire humanitarian situation and the unbearable civilian toll." On 19 February, every single member state of the European Union, with the exception of Hungary, asked the Israeli military not to take military action in Rafah. On 15 May, Borrell called on Israel to immediately halt its assault on Rafah, stating it was disrupting humanitarian aid and causing a humanitarian crisis, while also calling on Hamas to release all Israeli hostages.
- Belgium: Prime Minister Alexander De Croo has warned that Israel's incursion "would cause a further unmitigated humanitarian catastrophe and result in the death of numerous innocent civilians, again mostly children and women."
- Denmark: The Ministry of Foreign Affairs made a statement on X, said that "Denmark shares the concern of EU and others regarding a potential Israeli military offensive in Rafah where more than half of Gaza's population is seeking refuge."
- France: Foreign Minister Stéphane Séjourné stated an Israeli assault on Rafah would be unjustified. In a phone call, Emmanuel Macron told Netanyahu that he was opposed to a military invasion of Rafah. On 16 February, Macron stated, "I share the fears of Jordan and Egypt of a forced and massive displacement of the population".
- Germany: Foreign Minister Annalena Baerbock stated, "Taking action now in Rafah, the last and most overcrowded place, as announced by the Israeli defence minister, would simply not be justifiable". On 14 February, Baerbock stated, "If the Israeli army were to launch an offensive on Rafah... it would be a humanitarian catastrophe." On 17 February, Chancellor Olaf Scholz reaffirmed Germany's support for Israel's "security", but also warned Israeli leaders to abide by international law. On 16 March, Scholz stated, "There is a danger that a comprehensive offensive in Rafah will result in many terrible civilian casualties, which must be strictly prohibited".
- Ireland: Micheál Martin stated an Israeli invasion of Rafah would entail "grave violations of international humanitarian law".
- Italy: Prime Minister Giorgia Meloni stated, "We will reiterate our opposition to military action on the ground by Israel in Rafah that could have even more catastrophic consequences for the civilians".
- Luxembourg: Foreign Minister Xavier Bettel told Israel they risked losing "the last support they have in the world" if they attacked Rafah.
- Netherlands: Foreign Minister, Hanke Bruins Slot, stated that Israel's planned assault on Rafah was "unjustifiable". Prime Minister Mark Rutte stated, "An Israeli offensive in Rafah would cause a humanitarian disaster".
- Slovenia: The Prime Minister Robert Golob stated, "There is a common consensus in saying that we should do everything we can to prevent an attack on Rafah."
- Spain: The country signed a joint statement with the government of Ireland stating, "The expanded Israeli military operation in the Rafah area poses a grave and imminent threat that the international community must urgently confront".
- United Kingdom: Foreign Minister David Cameron stated, "We think it is impossible to see how you can fight a war amongst these people. There's nowhere for them to go... what we want is an immediate pause in the fighting, and we want that pause to lead to a ceasefire".

=== Middle East ===
- Arab League: Chief Ahmed Aboul Gheit stated any attempt to displace Palestinians would cause the "Middle East [to] explode in an unprecedented way" and create "a confrontation for the next thousand years".
- Egypt: The country denied claims that it would suspend the Egypt–Israel peace treaty if Israel invaded Rafah as long as Israel also adheres to its part of the treaty. Egypt warned that a refugee crisis would occur in Sinai and sent 40 tanks to its border with Israel. The Ministry of Foreign Affairs stated there would be "dire consequences" if Israel invaded Rafah. On 7 May, Canadian-Israeli businessman Ziv Kipper was killed in Egypt. A previously unknown group called "Vanguards of Liberation - the Martyr Mohammad Salah" claimed responsibility, citing retaliation for Israel's takeover of the Rafah border crossing.
- GCC: stated an invasion of Rafah would be a "blatant violation of international law".
- Hamas: The group said that an assault on Rafah would mean a breakdown in negotiations on a truce and prisoner exchange that have been ongoing for weeks.
- Jordan: King Abdullah II said that the world "cannot afford" an Israeli assault on Rafah as it would create another humanitarian catastrophe.
- Oman: The Foreign Ministry stated, "We warn of the serious repercussions of the continuation of the occupation in its indiscriminate aggression in the Gaza Strip and its plans to storm Rafah."
- Palestine: President Mahmoud Abbas stated the impending Israeli invasion of Rafah would create "another Nakba, which will push the whole region into endless wars".
- Qatar: The country urged the United Nations Security Council to prevent Israel from committing genocide and warned of a humanitarian catastrophe in Rafah.
- Saudi Arabia: The foreign ministry warned of "very serious repercussions of storming and targeting" Rafah. In a later statement, the foreign ministry stated Israel's planned invasion of Rafah was part of a "continued violation of international law and international humanitarian law".
- Turkey: The foreign ministry stated, "We consider this operation as part of a plan to expel the people of Gaza from their own land... We call on the international community, in particular the UN Security Council, to take the necessary steps to stop Israel." In response to the airstrike on 26 May, protesters threw Molotov cocktails at the Israeli embassy in Istanbul.

=== Oceania ===
- Australia: Prime Minister Anthony Albanese made a joint statement with Prime Minister Justin Trudeau of Canada and Christopher Luxon of New Zealand, stating that "There is simply nowhere else for civilians to go," and Israel "must listen to its friends".
- New Zealand: The Prime Minister of New Zealand Christopher Luxon warned Israel along with the Prime Ministers of Australia and Canada that an invasion of Rafah would lead to humanitarian catastrophe.

=== International organizations ===
==== Humanitarian aid groups ====
Save the Children stated, "Where is there left for the population to go? They have been already moved from the north of Gaza, from the central areas of Gaza – moved around like pieces on a chess board to achieve military objectives. There is nowhere left for them to move." The Norwegian Refugee Council stated, "An expansion of hostilities could turn Rafah into a zone of bloodshed and destruction that people won't be able to escape. There is nowhere left for people to flee to." Omar Shakir, the Human Rights Watch director for Israel and Palestine stated, "There's nowhere safe to go in Gaza. The ICJ has ordered Israel to prevent genocide. The [international] community should act to prevent further atrocities."

Al Mezan Center stated, "The international community must act now to halt the ground invasion of Rafah." The Carter Center stated "Ordering this new wave of displacement of Palestinians will further exacerbate the humanitarian crisis". Doctors Without Borders stated, "Israel's declared ground offensive on Rafah would be catastrophic and must not proceed". The International Committee of the Red Cross called on Israel to "spare and protect civilian lives and infrastructure". On 13 February, the Lemkin Institute for Genocide Prevention issued an SOS alert, stating the attacks on Rafah had "worsened the already horrific humanitarian situation".

A joint statement signed by Oxfam, Amnesty International, ActionAid, War Child, the Danish Refugee Council and Handicap International stated, "We are appalled by the harrowing developments in Rafah, Gaza's most populated area where 1.5 million people are sheltering as their last resort – over half a million of them children". In an interview, the president of the American Near East Refugee Aid stated, "If a Rafah operation happens, I just can't imagine how anything survives."

==== United Nations ====
In advance of an expected ground invasion of Rafah, UN Secretary General Antonio Guterres stated, "Such an action would exponentially increase what is already a humanitarian nightmare with untold regional consequences." The UN General Assembly President Dennis Francis stated, "I am shocked and deeply dismayed by the news of an Israeli military offensive into the south of the Gaza Strip. I join the Secretary-General in pleading on behalf of the multitudes of innocent civilians with nowhere safe to go". The World Food Programme stated it was deeply concerned by a military offensive in Rafah.

Catherine M. Russell, the president of UNICEF, stated, "Some 1.3M civilians are pushed into a corner, living on streets or shelters. They must be protected. They have nowhere safe to go". Martin Griffiths, the UN humanitarian aid coordinator, stated, "The scenario we have long dreaded is unraveling at alarming speed... Military operations in Rafah could lead to a slaughter in Gaza." Sigrid Kaag stated an offensive on Rafah would be disastrous. On 14 February, the World Health Organization stated an attack on Rafah would "expand the humanitarian disaster beyond imagination [and] push the health system closer to the brink of collapse".

The International Court of Justice rejected a request by South Africa for additional provision measures preventing a Rafah offensive but urged Israel to adhere to existing provisional measures while expressing concern over a "humanitarian nightmare". Alice Wairimu Nderitu, the UN's special adviser on the prevention of genocide, stated that the risk of atrocities during an Israeli offensive on Rafah were "serious, real and high". Filippo Grandi, the UN's high commissioner for refugees, stated an exodus of Palestinians from Gaza would be "a disaster for the future of peace".

Subsequently, on 10 May 2024, South Africa requested additional provisional measures that would protect the population of Rafah in the face of Israeli attack in that area. South Africa's arguments for these provisional measures were presented orally on 16 May, and Israel's arguments were presented the following day. Before closing the hearing on 17 May, the ICJ requested Israel provide more information about humanitarian conditions in its declared "evacuation zones" in Gaza. Judge Georg Nolte asked Israel to clarify the conditions in these zones, including how it plans to ensure the safe passage of evacuees and the provision of essential supplies such as food and shelter. Israel has been asked to submit a written reply to the question by 18 May at 4 pm. On 24 May 2024, the court ruled that the Rafah offensive constituted a violation of the Palestinians' right for safety and therefore must cease immediately.

The Inter-Agency Standing Committee – a coalition of UN agencies and non-UN humanitarian organization – stated that an Israeli attack on Rafah would "deal a death blow to a humanitarian response that is already on its knees". Tedros Adhanom Ghebreyesus, the secretary-general of WHO, stated he feared a ground-scale invasion of Rafah, since people sheltering there were "out of options for where to go". Volker Türk, the UN human rights chief, stated a Rafah offensive "would take the nightmare being inflicted on people in Gaza into a new, dystopian, dimension". Paula Gaviria Betancur, the UN special rapporteur on the rights of internally displaced persons, stated, "Any evacuation order imposed on Rafah under the current conditions, with the rest of Gaza lying in ruins, would be in flagrant violation of international humanitarian law". A group of 50 UN experts called for sanctions and an arms embargo on Israel due to the Tel al-Sultan massacre.

=== International Court of Justice ===
On 10 May 2024, South Africa requested additional provisional measures that would protect the population of Rafah in the face of Israeli attack in that area. South Africa's arguments for these provisional measures were presented orally on 16 May, and Israel's arguments were presented the following day.

Before closing the hearing on 17 May, the ICJ requested Israel provide more information about humanitarian conditions in its declared "evacuation zones" in Gaza. Judge Georg Nolte asked Israel to clarify the conditions in these zones, including how it plans to ensure the safe passage of evacuees and the provision of essential supplies such as food and shelter. Israel has been asked to submit a written reply to the question by 18 May at 4 pm.

On 24 May 2024, the court ordered a halt to Israel's Rafah offensive. The order was considered by some experts to be ambiguous, particularly regarding whether it outright prohibited or merely limited offensive operations in Rafah. Judge Nawaf Salam said the court sees the situation in Rafah as "disastrous" and "Israel must immediately halt its military offensive and any other action in Rafah which may inflict on the Palestinian group in Gaza conditions of life that could bring about its physical destruction in whole or in part". Israel denounced the ICJ and said its assault on Rafah can continue under the ruling because it does not pose an unlawful threat to civilians.

Some judges argued that some military operations in Rafah were still permitted under the order. Of the five judges which published statements, four allowed for some limited military operations, with the Israeli, German, Ugandan and Romanian Judges arguing that the ruling does not mandate a unilateral ceasefire in Rafah, and allows for preventative and defensive actions against Hamas as well as the rescue of hostages. The South African judge disagreed, stating that while defensive actions against specific attacks are permitted, any offensive ones would not be.

South Africa, the Palestinian Authority, Hamas, the Egyptian, Turkish, and Saudi Arabian foreign ministries, Canadian Deputy Prime Minister Chrystia Freeland, EU High Representative of Foreign Affairs Josep Borrell, the Jordanian, Belgian, and Norwegian foreign ministers, war crimes prosecutor Reed Brody, Global Rights Compliance, and the Council on American–Islamic Relations welcomed the ruling, while the United States and Israel rebuked it.

== See also ==
- 2025 Gaza Strip aid distribution killings
- Gaza paramedic massacre
