= Al Qarya as Suwaydiya =

Village in Rafah Governorate, Gaza Strip

- Municipality type D (Village council)

Arabic transcription(s)
  - Arabic: القرية السويدية
  - Latin: Al Qarya as Suwaydiya (official)
- Interactive map of Al Qarya as Suwaydiya
- Coordinates: 31°19′24″N 34°13′15″E
- State: State of Palestine
- Governorate: Rafah
- Founded: 1965

Government
  - Type: Village council

Population (2023)
  - Total: 1,300

Al Qarya as Suwaydiya (Arabic: القرية السويدية), known as Swedish village, was a village situated near Egypt–Gaza border in the Rafah Governorate, Gaza Strip. The village was described as "forgotten" due to the lack of basic services. It was destroyed during the Rafah offensive as part of the Israeli invasion of the Gaza Strip in 2024.

== History ==
Al Qarya as Suwaydiya was founded in 1965 with Swedish and international troops' assistance for the Palestinian refugees who were compelled to move from their homes in 1948. In 1982, several houses in the village were razed to expand the border strip. In 1997, the village had a population of 568.

Al Qarya as Suwaydiya was proposed to be demolished because of the Al-Rashid road construction plan, which will pass the village, yet the villagers rejected that proposal. The village was destroyed during the Rafah offensive as part of the Israeli invasion of the Gaza Strip in 2024.

== Economy ==
The villagers heavily depended on the fishing sector. However, the residents endured economic hardship from 2007 due to the blockade of the Gaza Strip and fishing prohibition imposed by Israel. Furthermore, the high level of marine pollution undermined the fishing industry in the village. Due to the prohibition, many of the villagers were unemployed or worked in the agricultural sector.

== Electricity ==
The village received electricity from the generator four hours daily in the evening after the Israeli disengagement from Gaza, with the Hamas government later extending the electricity network to it.
