= Zoroub Hill =

Zoroub Hill تل زعرب (Arabic) Tel Zarub, Tel Rafah
- Hill
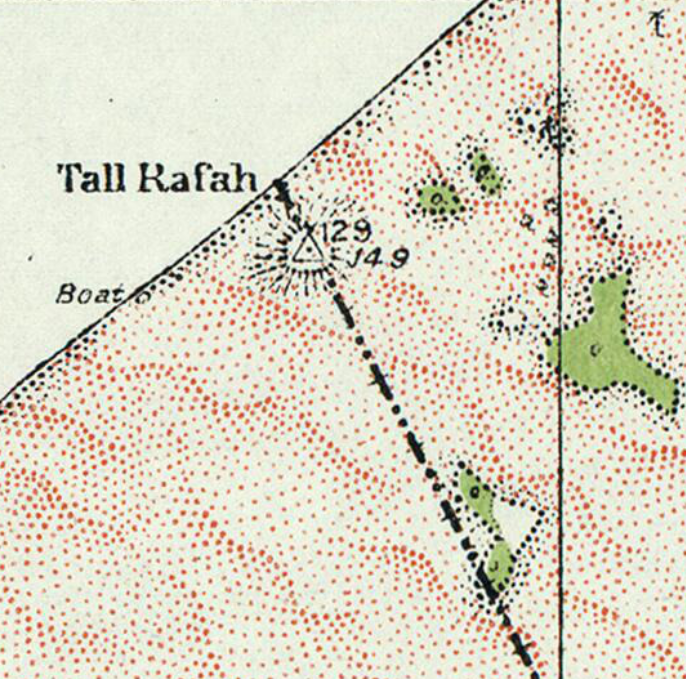
- Survey of Palestine, British Mandate, 1942.
- Grid position: Palestine grid 629/1251
- Location: Rafah, Gaza Strip, Palestine
- Elevation: 39 m (129 ft)

Zoroub Hill (also known as Zurub hilltop) is located on the north-west outskirts of Rafah some 2.5 kilometres (1.6 mi) north-west from the central al-Ada roundabout. It is the highest point in the Gaza Strip which directly overlooks the Philadelphi Corridor and the border with Egypt. A strategic height at 39 metres (128 ft), Zoroub Hill was captured by IDF tanks on 28 May 2024 during the Israeli invasion of the Gaza Strip (2023–present) after a brief gun battle with Hamas.

== Gallery ==
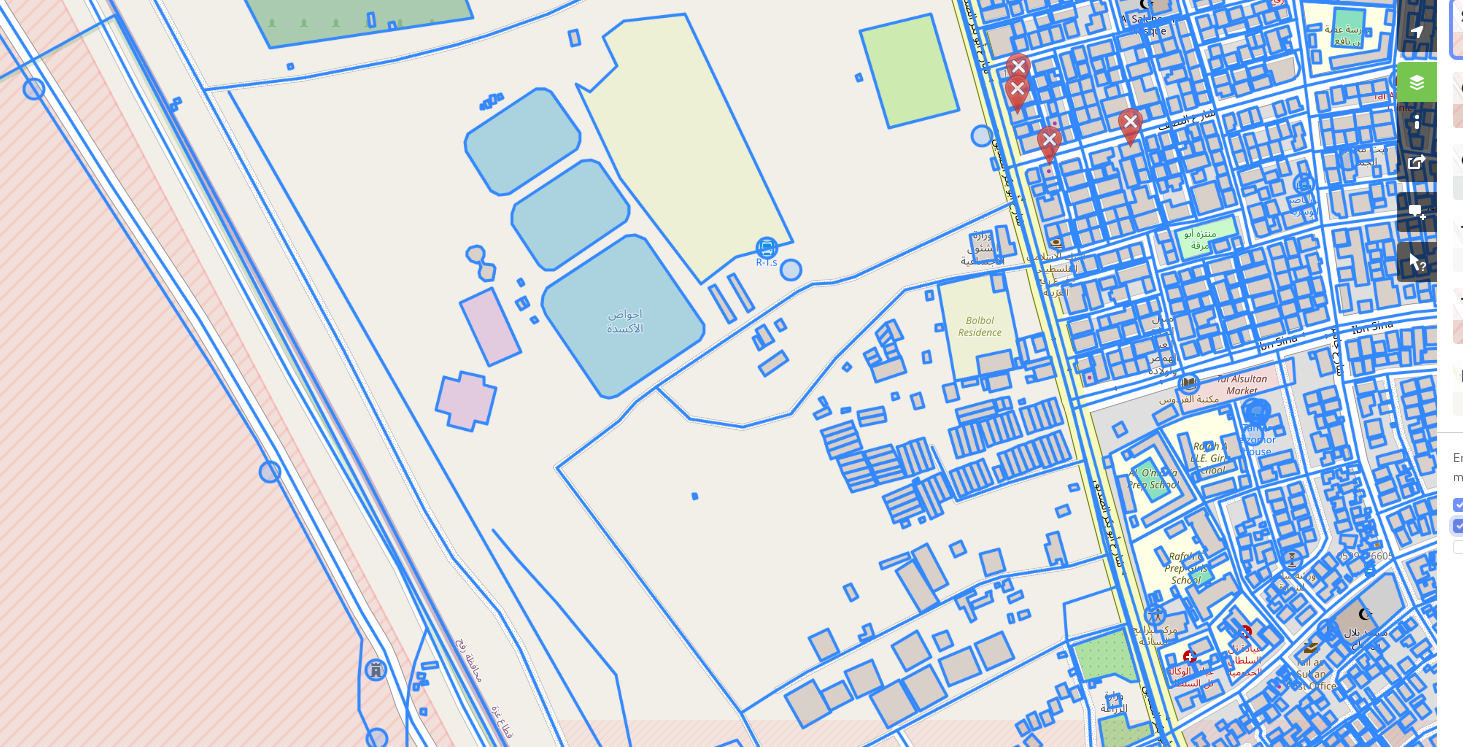
Zoroub Hill, immediately south of three wastewater treatment ponds, west of the Ibn Sina terminus and ENE of an Egyptian observation post. (Click to enlarge.)

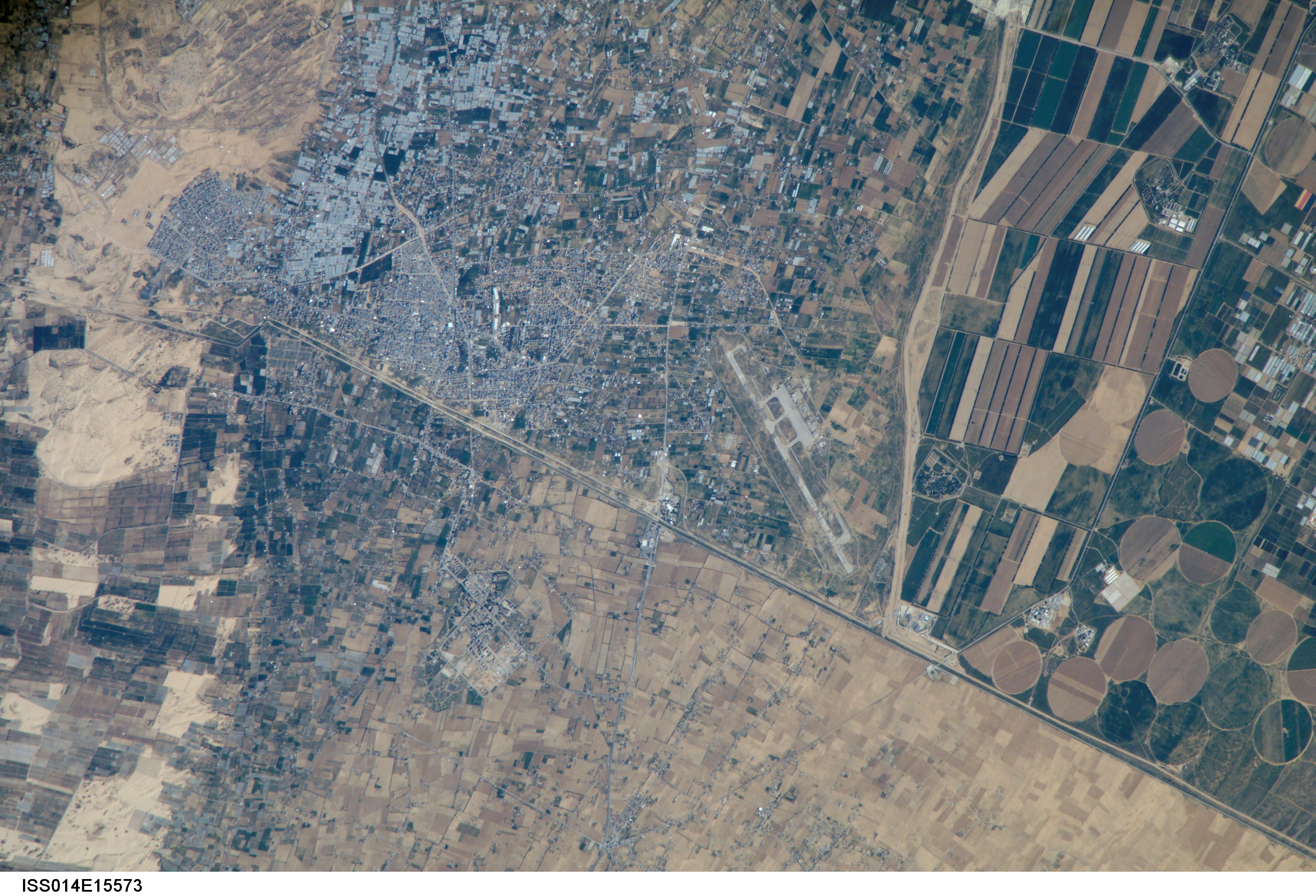
Rafah, Gaza Strip, Palestine is to the northwest, Rafah, Egypt to the south, and Israel to the east. (Click to enlarge.)
