= Rafah Governorate =

Governorate of Palestine

Coordinates: 31.3°N 34.25°E

Rafah Governorate محافظة رفح
- Governorate
- Interactive map of Rafah Governorate
- Country: Palestine
- Territory: Gaza Strip
- Control: Israel; Popular Forces

Area
  - Total: 65 km^{2} (25 sq mi)

Population (2017)
  - Total: 233,878
  - Density: 3,600/km^{2} (9,300/sq mi)
- ISO 3166 code: PS-RFH

The Rafah Governorate (Arabic: محافظة رفح, romanized: Muḥāfaẓat Rafaḥ) is a Governorate of Palestine in the southernmost portion of the Gaza Strip. Its district capital or muhfaza is the city of Rafah located on the border with Egypt. According to the Palestinian Central Bureau of Statistics, the governorate had a population of 267,635 in mid-year 2022. It contains the closed down Yasser Arafat International Airport.

== Localities ==
- Al-Bayuk (al-Buyuk)
- Al-Mawasi
- Al Qarya as Suwaydiya
- Rafah (seat)
- Shokat as-Sufi

== Refugee camps ==
- Rafah Camp
- Tel al-Sultan (Tall as-Sultan)

== Sources ==
- "Projected Mid -Year Population for Rafah Governorate by Locality 2004- 2006". PCBS. 2006. Archived from the original on 20 May 2011.
