= Eyal Hulata =

Israeli security official (born 1976)

- איל חולתא
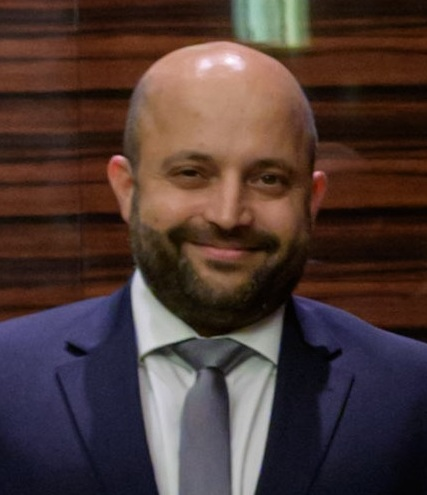
- Hulata in 2021

Head of National Security Council
- In office 15 August 2021 – 8 January 2023
- Prime Minister: Naftali Bennett (Until 30 June 2022); Yair Lapid (1 July–29 December 2022); Benjamin Netanyahu (From 29 December 2022)
- Preceded by: Meir Ben-Shabbat
- Succeeded by: Tzachi Hanegbi

Personal details
- Born: 1976 (age 49–50) Rishon LeZion, Israel
- Children: 3
- Education: Tel Aviv University; Harvard University; Hebrew University of Jerusalem
- Awards: Israel Defense Prize

Eyal Hulata (Hebrew: איל חולתא; born 1976) is an Israeli security official, who formerly served as the head of the National Security Council.

== Early life ==
Eyal Hulata was born in 1976 to Professor Gideon Hulata, a researcher at Volcani Center, and Batya, a biology teacher. His father has roots in the Dutch city of Monnickendam, while his mother immigrated from Iran. Hulata grew up in the city of Rishon LeZion, where he attended Gymnasia Realit and participated in Maccabi Hatzair.

== Education ==
Hulata received a bachelor's degree in mathematics and physics from the Hebrew University of Jerusalem as part of the Talpiot program.

In 2011, Hulata received a PhD in physics from Tel Aviv University, where he wrote a doctoral research on neural network supervised by Professor Eshel Ben-Jacob.

Hulata received a master's degree in public administration from Harvard University as part of a program from Wexner Foundation.

Hulata has several patents filed under his name.

== Public career ==
=== Work in Mossad ===
After his military service, Hulata continued to work in Mossad for another 17 years in several positions, including the head of technological research and development and later as head of the team on unconventional weapons. Hulata received an Israel Defense Prize for his work in Mossad.

During this time, there were reports that Hulata did not agree with Prime Minister Benjamin Netanyahu in opposing the Iran nuclear deal, and that he preferred influencing the terms of the agreement rather than oppose it entirely.

After leaving Mossad, Hulata worked at the financial technology company Pagaya, where he worked as chief process officer and was involved in technological entrepreneurship addressing the climate crisis.

=== National Security Advisor ===
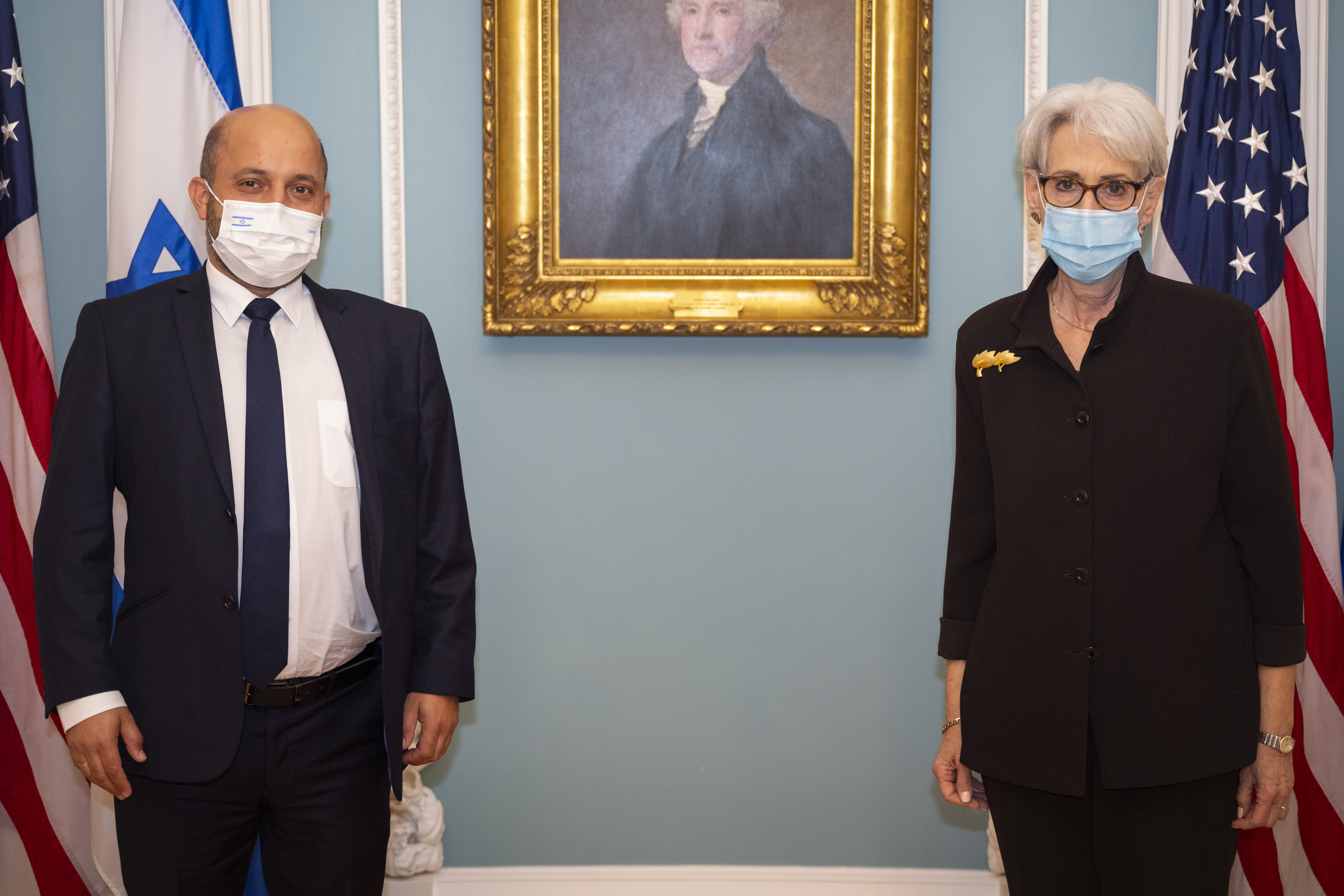
Israeli National Security advisor Eyal Hulata met with U.S. Deputy State Secretary Wendy Sherman in August 2021 in Washington D.C.

Following the establishment of the 36th government, new Prime Minister Naftali Bennett appointed Hulata as the new National Security Advisor, replacing the outgoing Meir Ben-Shabbat. He was approved by the Knesset a week later, and took office on 15 August 2021.

In October 2022, following a negotiated settlement of the Israeli–Lebanese maritime border dispute, Hulata stressed that the most important part of the agreement is that Lebanon agreed to end its maritime claims.

Following the formation of the 37th government, Hulata was replaced by Tzachi Hanegbi on 8 January 2023.

In February 2023, Hulata reflected on Israel's role in peace negotiations during the Russian invasion of Ukraine that he personally helped conduct. He affirmed that he did not regret in the mediation efforts, that "it’s true, we failed, but I was proud we tried".

In March 2023, Hulata was appointed as chairman of the board of directors in the hi-tech company Hellman-Aldubi.

In November 2023, following the October 7 attack, Hulata expressed surprise at Hamas's degree of preparation and the IDF's lack of defensive mechanisms.

In May 2025, Hulata criticized the government for lacking a "clear security doctrine" amidst the continuing Gaza war. He also stressed that "defeating Hamas will not solve the issue of extremism in Gaza", and that it is important to consider important opportunities to reach normalization, citing the success of the Abraham Accords.
