= National Security Council (Israel) =

Security council in Israel

- המטה לביטחון לאומי
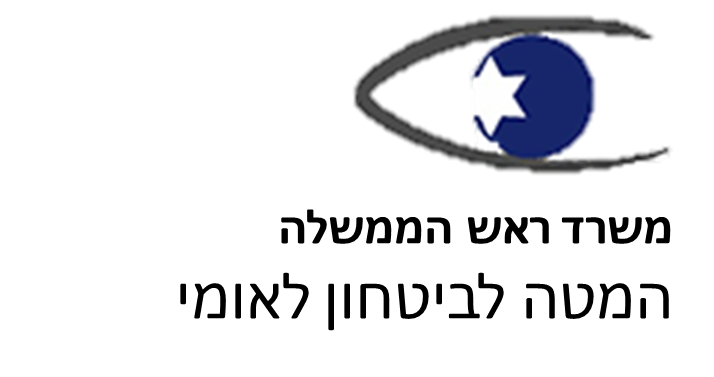

Agency overview
- Formed: 1999
- Agency executive: Samuel Benezra, Head and National Security Advisor
- Parent ministry: Prime Minister's Office
- Website: https://www.gov.il/en/departments/national-security-council/govil-landing-page

The National Security Council (NSC) (Hebrew: המטה לביטחון לאומי HaMateh leBitachon Leumi) is Israel's central body for coordination, integration, analysis and monitoring in the field of national security and is the staff forum on national security for the Israeli Prime Minister and Government. However, national security decisions typically made by national security councils in other countries are handled by the Security Cabinet. The council draws its authority from the government and operates according to guidelines from the Prime Minister.

The NSC was established in 1999 by the office of Prime Minister Benjamin Netanyahu following Government Resolution 4889, in the framework of drawing lessons from the Yom Kippur War. Its responsibilities were anchored in law starting in July 2008, partly as a response to the Second Lebanon War.

== Basis for operations ==
Article 7 of the Government Law of 2001 states that "the Government will have a staff, established by the Prime Minister, to provide professional consulting in the fields of national security; the Prime Minister is authorized to entrust the staff with additional consulting fields."

Government Resolution 4889, dated March 7, 1999, established the National Security Council. The government resolution specified, among others, that:

- The objective of the NSC is to serve as a centralized advisory body to the prime minister and the government regarding issues of national security.
- The NSC derives its authority from the government and operates in accordance with directives issued by the prime minister.

== Roles ==
The National Security Council is the prime minister's and the government's staff forum in the field of national security. The roles of the NSC, as stipulated in the Government Resolution, are as follows:

- To hold senior council forums for the prime minister and the government regarding issues of national security.
- To coordinate integrative assessments of processes and trends in all aspects of national security.
- To direct integrative staff operations between offices and authorities dealing with national security in order to increase coordination and integration between them.
- To prepare for deliberations by the government, ministerial committee for national security and the prime minister.
- To advise the government on policies relating to national security.
- To plan, based on a long-term perspective, national security components, with the assistance of existing planning bodies in State offices and organizations dealing with national security.
- To follow up and provide updates regarding activities and implementation of resolutions related to national security.
- To maintain coordination and cooperation with parallel national security authorities in selected countries.

Among the council's functions are: strategic advisement to the prime minister, offering security recommendations to the government, joint direction and coordinations of the security arms as well as inspection and supervision of decision-making related to the security bodies. Other functions include long-term planning of security approaches, and maintaining cooperative and coordinative relations with the national security elements of selected countries.

The NSC also maintains high-level diplomatic communications with world powers.

== Major areas of activity ==
The NSC formulates alternatives for Israeli policy on the political process and relationships with:

- Middle East countries, especially with the Palestinians, Lebanon, Syria, Egypt, Jordan and other countries.
- Great powers: the United States, Russia, European Union, China and India.
- Key countries: Turkey and India
- Major international organizations such as the United Nations, NATO and OECD.

The council has engaged in issues such as the planning of the West Bank barrier and supervision over its implementation, the Gaza disengagement plan, and the agreement with Egypt over the Philadelphi Route.

A new area of activity relates to energy issues, based on a comprehensive national security perspective, including:

- Energy providers
- Strategic reserves
- Source combination

== Structure ==
The National Security Council is part of the Prime Minister's Office and reports to him directly about issues related to national security.

The council comprises three wings: Security Policy, Foreign Policy, and the Counter-Terrorism Bureau. It has two advisors: legal and economic.

Since the end of December 2006, the office of the head of the NSC and the staff of the Foreign Policy Division, the Security Division and the legal advisor have been located in the prime minister's building in Jerusalem. The remaining staff of the NSC and the Counter-Terrorism Bureau headquarters are located at the NSC facility in Ramat Hasharon.

The council's work is considered secret, and is done outside the public's eye. Its authority is vague and the prime minister is not obligated to accept its recommendations, unlike with those of the attorney general, for example.

=== Head ===
The first National Security Advisor and Head of NSC was General (in reserve) David Ivri. The current Head is Shmuel Benezra.

Historical heads were:

- David Ivri, 1999–2000
- Gideon Sheffer, (Acting) 2000
- Uzi Dayan, 2000–2002
- Ephraim Halevi, 2002–2003
- Israel Michaeli, 2003–2004
- Giora Eiland, 2004–2006
- Ilan Mizrahi, 2006–2007
- Dani Arditi, (Acting) 2007–2009
- Uzi Arad, 2009–2011
- Yaakov Amidror, 2011–2013
- Yossi Cohen, 2013–2016
- Yaakov Nagel, (Acting) 2016–2017
- Eytan Ben-David, 2017
- Meir Ben-Shabbat, 2017–2021
- Eyal Hulata, 2021–2023
- Tzachi Hanegbi, 2023–2025
- Gil Reich, (Acting) 2025–2026
- Samuel Benezra, 2026–present

=== Foreign Policy Wing ===
The National Security Council's Foreign Policy Division is in charge of planning, integration and coordination of policy on major issues of national security. The Division's roles:

- Formulation of political situation assessments
- Formulation of recommendations for Israeli policies
- Conducting strategic dialogs with National Security Councils of leading countries
