= Meir Ben-Shabbat =

Israeli soldier and political appointee (born 1966)

- מאיר בן שבת
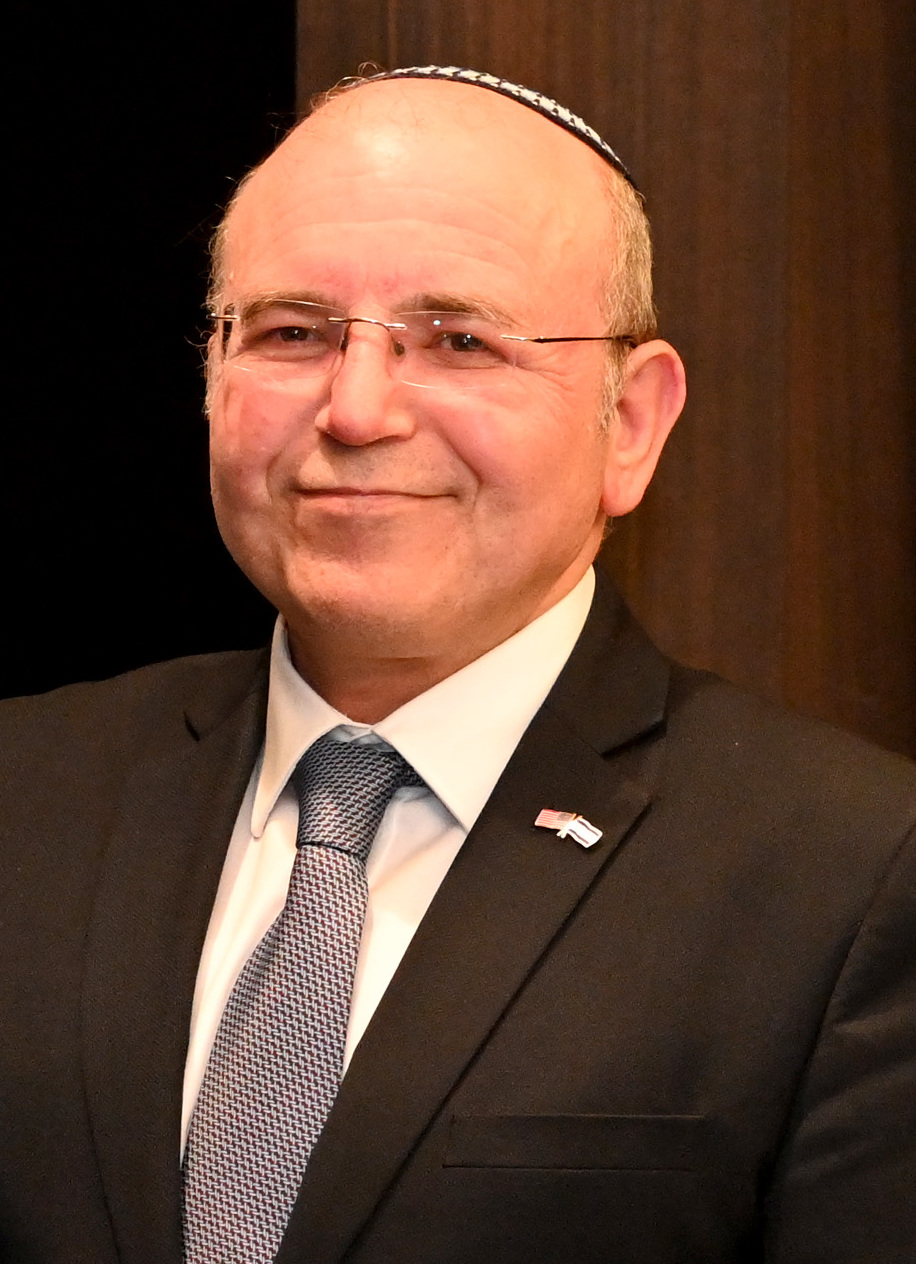

National Security Advisor of Israel
- In office 15 August 2017 – 15 August 2021
- Prime Minister: Benjamin Netanyahu
- Preceded by: Eytan Ben-David
- Succeeded by: Eyal Hulata

Personal details
- Born: 1966 (age 59–60) Dimona, Israel

Meir Ben-Shabbat (Hebrew: מאיר בן שבת; born 1966) is a former Israeli national security adviser and chief of staff for national security. He is also the former head of the Southern Region in the General Security Service. In July 2021, Ben Shabbat announced that he would step down from the National Security Adviser post by late August.

== Early life ==
Ben-Shabbat was born to Aziza and Makhlouf Ben-Shabbat, religious Jews who immigrated from Safi, Morocco. He is the 12th out of 14 children. He grew up in Dimona and studied at a state religious school and later at the Bnei Akiva Yeshiva Ohel Shlomo in Beer Sheva. He wrote for a local Dimona newspaper and a number of publications in southern Israel. Upon his enlistment in the IDF, he was assigned to the Givati Brigade. As part of his service he received several medals including the Presidential Medal of Excellence.

He holds a bachelor's degree in political science from Bar-Ilan University.

In 1989, upon completing his army duty, he joined the Shabak and served in various capacities and command positions. His duties included dealing with Hamas in the Gaza Strip during Operation Cast Lead. During his service he served as head of the cyber security department and worked on the prevention of terrorism.

== National Security Advisor ==
In 2017, he began serving as National Security Adviser and Deputy Chief of Staff for National Security in the Prime Minister's Office.

As part of his role, he was involved in Israel's fight against COVID-19.

== Abraham Accords ==
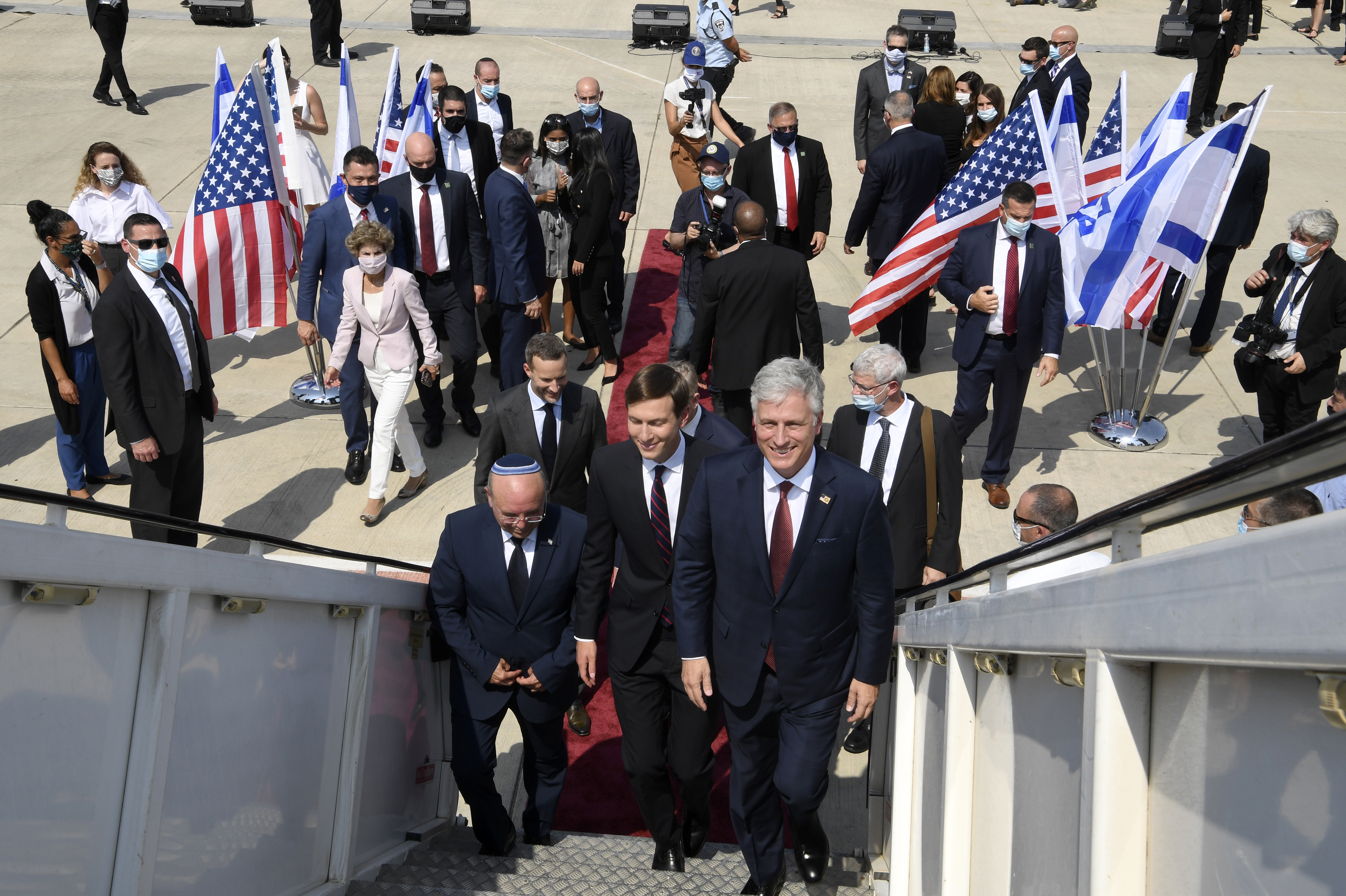
Meir Ben-Shabbat joins delegation as part of Abraham Accords.

Ben-Shabbat played a role in establishing ties with Israel and the United Arab Emirates, Morocco and Bahrain as part of the US brokered Abraham Accords. In October 2020, he joined US Treasury Secretary Steve Mnuchin and other Israeli and American officials on the first official business delegation to the UAE. He led the Israeli delegation to Bahrain.
