= Dani Arditi =

Israeli military officer (1951–2026)

- דני ארדיטי
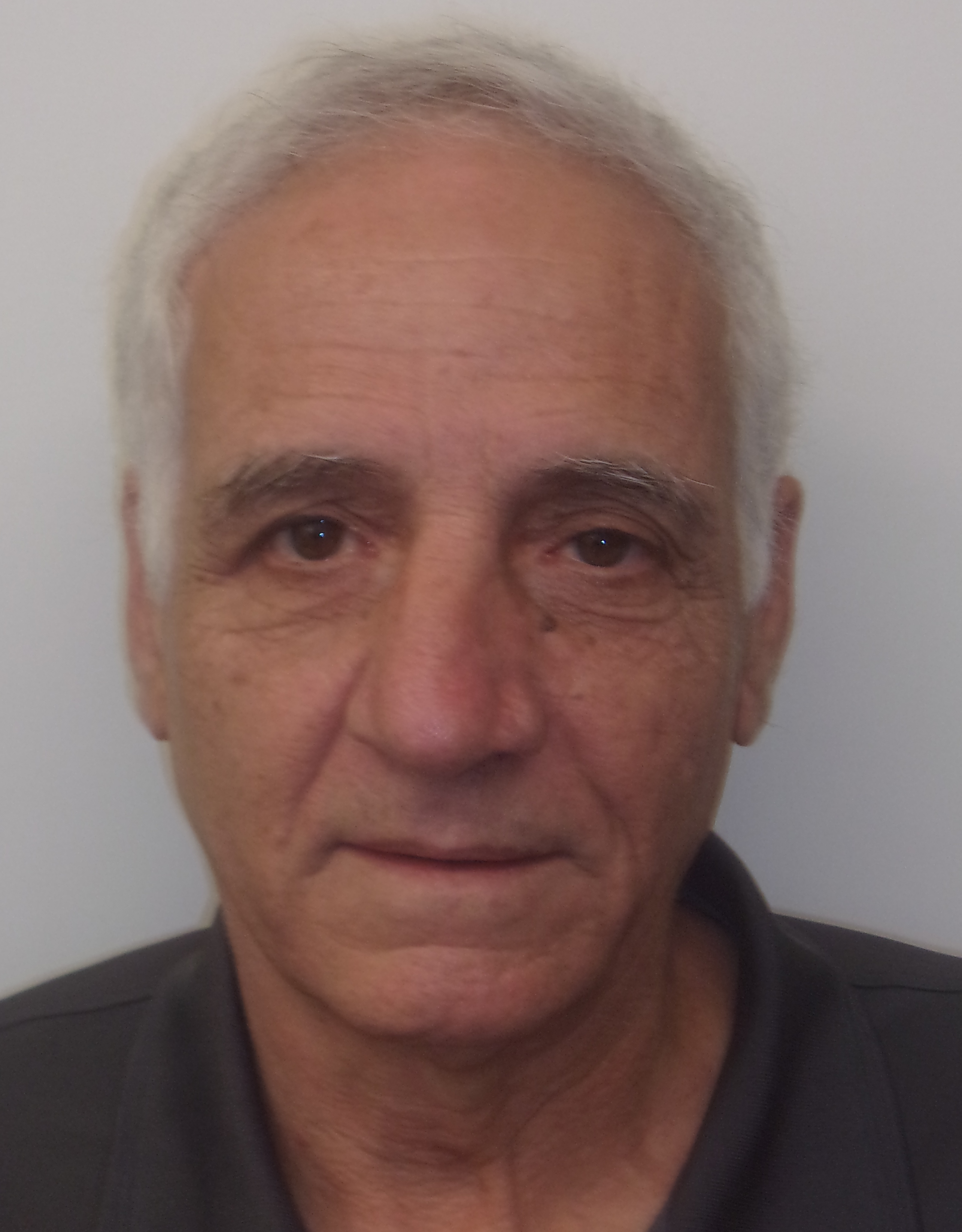
- Arditi in 2015
- Born: 1951; Yir'on, Israel
- Died: 12 February 2026 (aged 75)
- Military career
- Branch: Israel Defense Forces
- Service years: 1970–2002
- Rank: Brigadier general
- Commands: Laison Unit of Foreign Forces; External Relations Division
- Conflicts: Yom Kippur War; Operation Entebbe; 1982 Lebanon War

Head of the National Security Council of Israel
- Acting
- In office 2007–2009
- President: Shimon Peres
- Prime Minister: Ehud Olmert
- Preceded by: Ilan Mizrahi
- Succeeded by: Uzi Arad

Personal details
- Party: Israeli Labor Party

Dani Arditi (1951 – 12 February 2026) was an Israeli military officer.

== Early life and military career ==
Arditi was born in Yir'on, the son of Egyptian emigrants. In 1970, he enlisted in the Israel Defense Forces. He took part in Operation Sabena Flight 571 in 1972, after the plane was hijacked by four members of the Black September Organization. In 1973, he fought in the Yom Kippur War, and served as company commander in Operation Entebbe in 1976. During the 1982 Lebanon War, he served as company commander under the command of major generals Amiram Levin, Nehemiah Tamari and Shay Avital.

From 1984 to 1994, Arditi commanded numerous positions in the Israeli Intelligence Corps. In 1998, he was promoted to the rank of brigadier general, and was appointed commander of the Laison Unit of Foreign Forces. In 1999, he served as commander of the External Relations Division in Operations Directorate. He retired from his military service in 2002. In 2007, he was appointed acting head of the National Security Council of Israel after Ilan Mizrahi resigned. He served until 2009, when he was succeeded by Uzi Arad. In 2017, he joined the Israeli Labor Party.

== Death ==
Arditi died on 12 February 2026, at the age of 75.
