= Eytan Ben-David =

Israeli soldier

- איתן בן-דוד
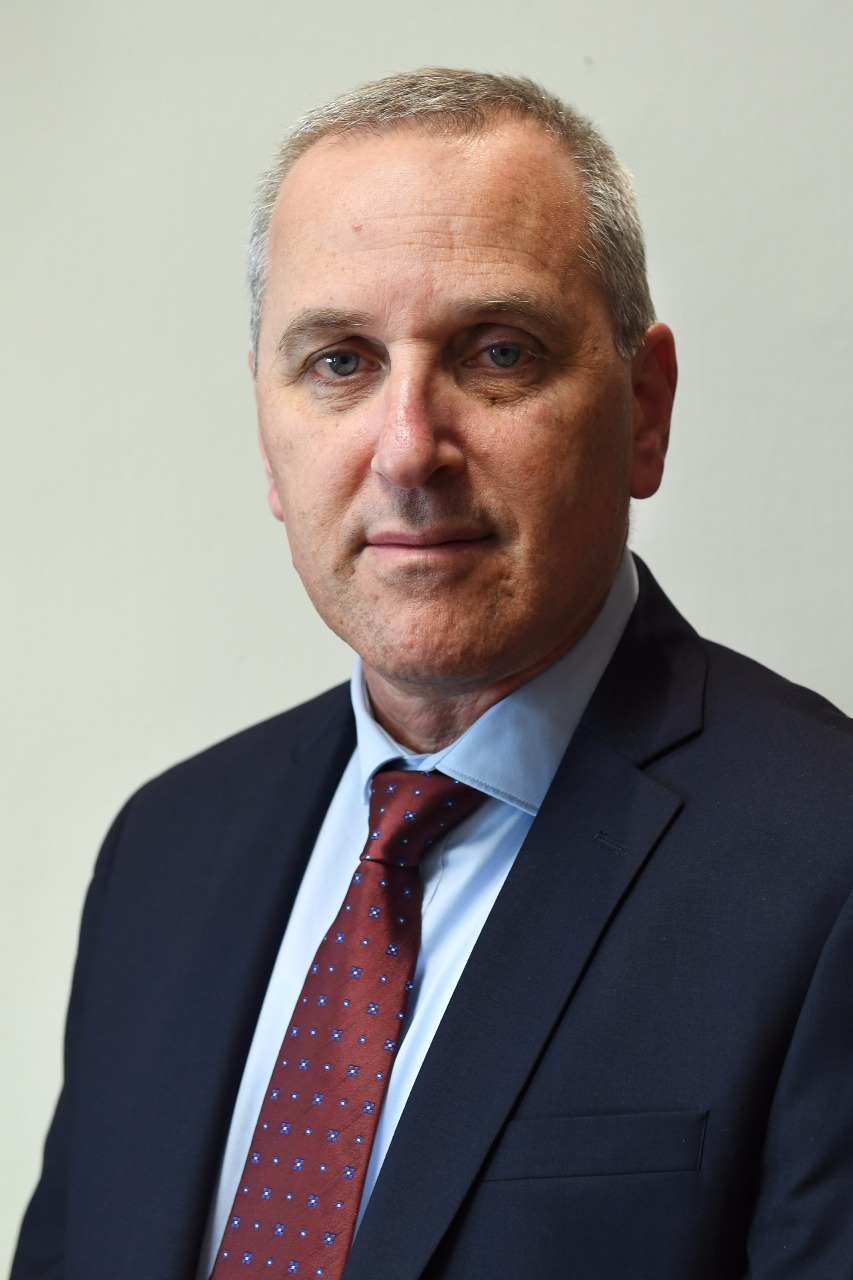

10th National Security Advisor (Israel)
- In office April 2017 – August 2017
- Preceded by: Yossi Cohen; Yaakov Nagel (Acting)
- Succeeded by: Meir Ben-Shabbat

Personal details
- Born: 1963 (age 61–62); Kiryat Ono, Israel
- Spouse: Ella
- Children: 3
- Education: BA in History of the Middle East and Geography, Tel Aviv University; MA in Administration and Public Policy, Herzlia Interdisciplinary Center

Eytan Ben-David (Hebrew: איתן בן-דוד; born in 1963) is a former senior Israel Security Agency official, currently serving as Acting National Security Advisor and Head of the National Security Council in the Office of the Prime Minister of Israel.

== Biography ==
Ben-David, son of Aliza and the late Azaria Witihovsky, was raised in Kiryat Ono. He was drafted into the IDF in 1982. He volunteered as a paratrooper in the Paratroopers Brigade. He served as a soldier and a squad leader. In 1983, he became an infantry officer after completing Officer Candidate School and served as a platoon leader and company commander in the Bislamach Brigade and fought in the first Lebanon War. In 1986, he retired from the IDF and joined the Israel Security Agency (then the General Security Service).

Ben-David began his career in the ISA Protection and Security Division and served in a number of command posts, including Regional Security Director for Europe between 2002 and 2005, Deputy Head of El Al's Aviation Security Division (on loan from the ISA) between 2005 and 2006, Head of the Dignitary Protection Unit between 2006–2010 and Deputy Head of the Protection and Security Division. In 2012, he retired from the ISA and was appointed Chief of the Counterterrorism Bureau and Deputy Head of the National Security Council in the Prime Minister's Office, until his appointment as Acting National Security Adviser and Head of the National Security Council in 2017.

== Personal life ==
Ben-David holds a BA in History of the Middle East and Geography from Tel Aviv University and a MA in Administration and Public Policy from the Herzlia Interdisciplinary Center.

He is married to Ella and the father of three.
