= Saliha =

Palestinian village depopulated in 1948

Saliha صَلْحَة
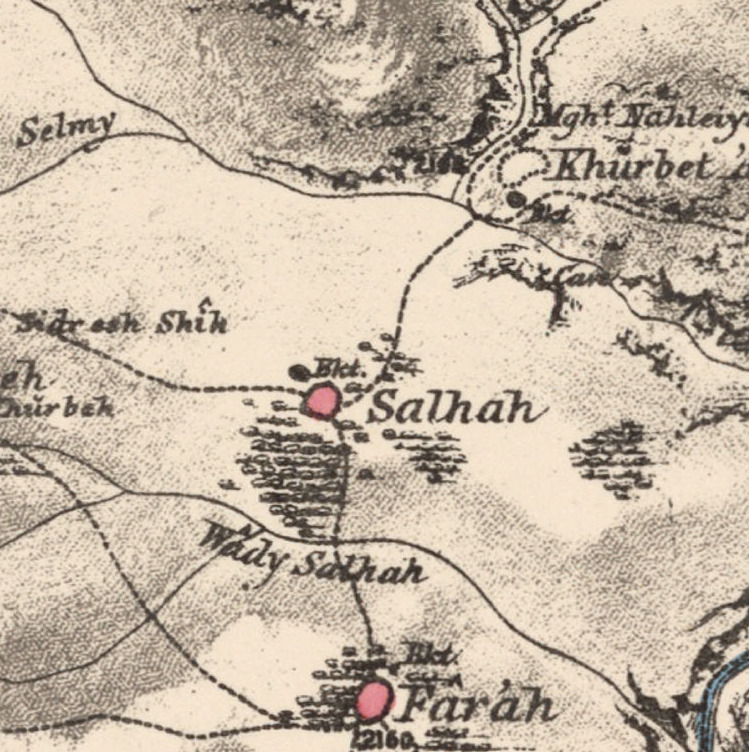
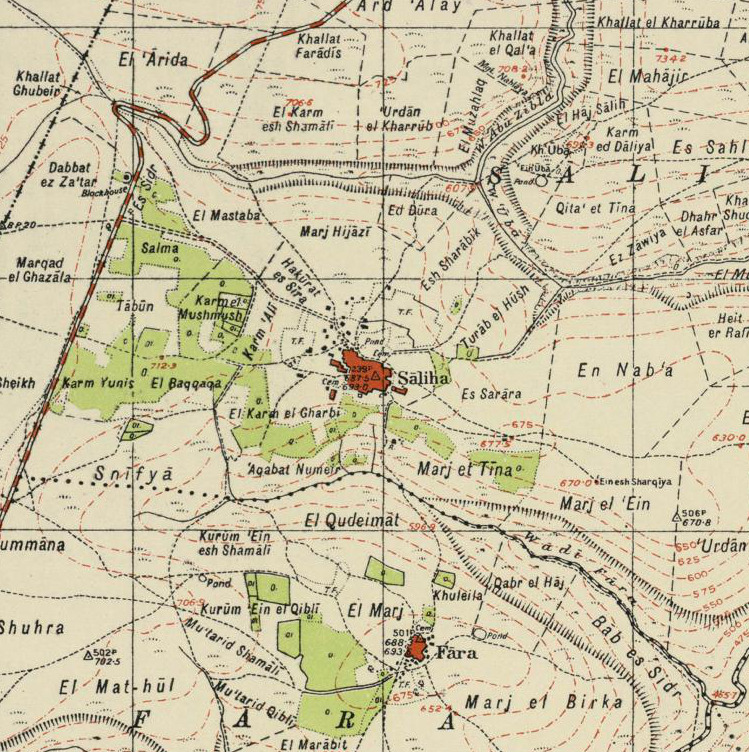
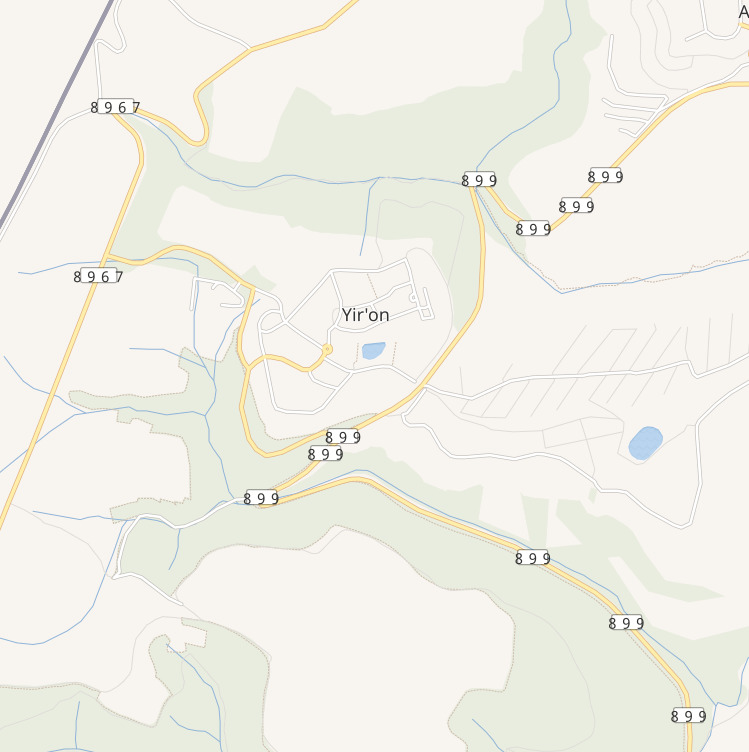
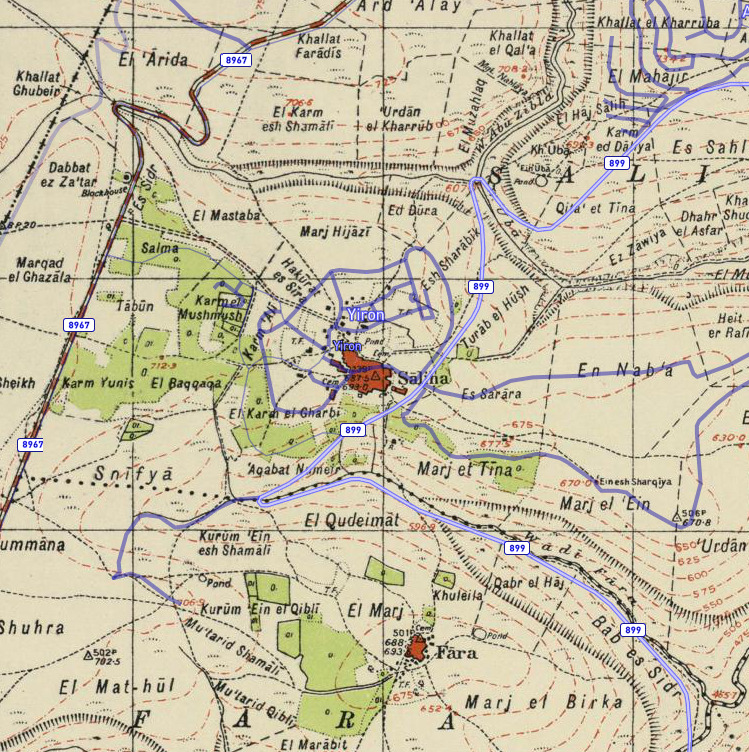
- 1870s map 1940s map modern map 1940s with modern overlay map A series of historical maps of the area around Saliha (click the buttons)

- Location within Mandatory Palestine
- Coordinates: 33°04′32″N 35°27′22″E
- Palestine grid: 192/275
- Geopolitical entity: Mandatory Palestine
- Subdistrict: Safad
- Date of depopulation: 30 October 1948

Area
  - Total: 11,735 dunams (11.735 km^{2}; 4.531 sq mi)

Population (1945)
  - Total: 1,070 (including Maroun al-Ras and Yaroun)
- Cause(s) of depopulation: Military assault by Yishuv forces
- Current localities: Yir'on and Avivim

Saliha (Arabic: صَلْحَة), sometimes transliterated Salha, meaning 'the good/healthy place', was a Palestinian Arab village located 12 kilometres northwest of Safed.

The Franco-British Paulet–Newcombe boundary agreement of 1920 placed Saliha within the French Mandate of Lebanon border, thus classifying it a part of Lebanese territory. It was one of the 24 villages transferred from the French mandate of Lebanon to British control in 1924 in accordance with the 1923 demarcation of the border between the Mandatory Palestine and the French Mandate for Syria and the Lebanon.

Under the 1948 United Nations Partition Plan for Palestine, Saliha was to be included in the proposed Arab state, while the boundary between it and the proposed Jewish state was to run north of the built-up area of the village.

During the 1948 Arab-Israeli War, Saliha was the site of a massacre carried out by Israeli forces shortly before the village was completely depopulated. The built structures in the village, with the exception of an elementary school for boys, were also destroyed.

== History ==
There were several old structures in the village, including rock-cut tombs, traces of mosaic floors, and oil presses. The nearby Khirbat al-Sanifa contained ancient relics, such as a circular pressing floor. A winepress was excavated in the area in 2001.

In 1881, the PEF's Survey of Western Palestine described Saliha as a village of about 200 people who cultivated gardens in the surrounding area and built their homes out of basalt stones mortared with mud. They took their drinking water from several cisterns and a large pond.

=== British Mandate era ===
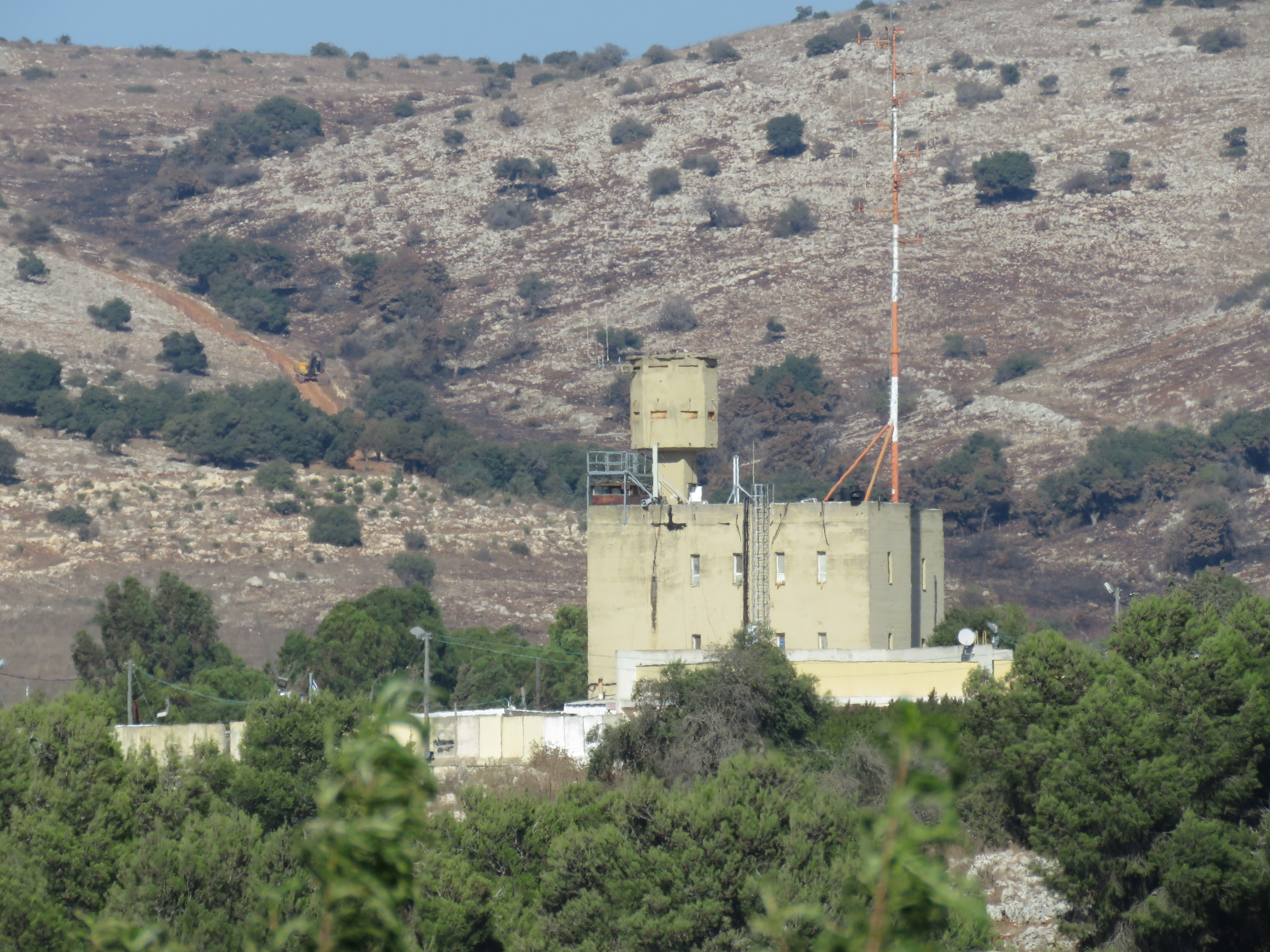
In 1938 the British built a Tegart fort in Saliha

Its population was predominantly Shia Muslim and it had an elementary school for boys.

In the 1931 census of Palestine the population of Salha was 742 Muslims, in a total of 142 houses.

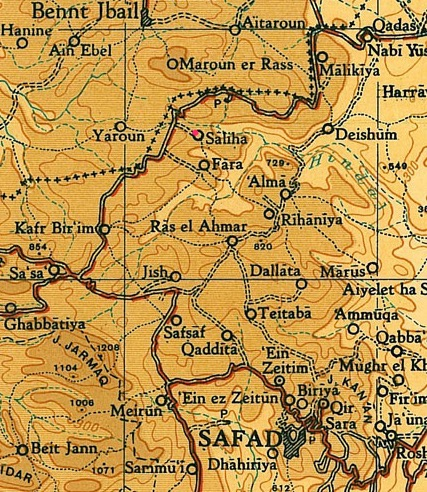
Saliha. 1945. Survey of Palestine. Scale 1:250,000

By the 1945 statistics the population was counted with Maroun al-Ras and Yaroun, and totaling 1,070 Muslims with 11,735 dunams of land, according to an official land and population survey. Of this, 7,401 dunams were allocated to cereals, 422 dunams were irrigated or used for orchards, while 58 dunams were built-up (urban) area.

=== 1948 war: massacre and depopulation ===
Israeli forces perpetrated a massacre in Saliha during the 1948 Palestine war. Between 30 October 1948 and 2 November 1948, Saliha was the first of three villages in which a massacre was committed by the 7th Brigade of the Israel Defense Forces under the command of General Moshe Carmel. The other two instances being the Safsaf massacre and a massacre in Jish.

In the case of Saliha, Israeli archival sources say the troops entered the village and blew up a structure, possibly a mosque, killing the 60 to 94 people who had taken refuge inside. These estimates are based on documentary evidence that include a 6 November 1948 diary entry by Yosef Nahmani. When Nahmani's papers was first published by his commander Yosef Weitz in 1965, guided by propagandistic motives, he laundered it to remove details of atrocities such as those which took place in Saliha. Nahmani refers to "'60 - 70' men and women murdered after 'they had raised a white flag'". Also referenced by Morris are handwritten notes taken by Aharon Cohen from the Mapam Political Committee meeting on 1 November 1948 in which Galili, or Moshe Erem is recorded as stating: "94 in Saliha blown up in a house". In accounts recorded from interviews with Saliha families, now resident in Lebanon, Robert Fisk provides a different version.

Nimr Aoun (b.1915), one of two survivors of the massacre in the square, says that when the Jewish army arrived, leaflets were handed over to villagers saying they would be spared if they surrendered, which they duly did. The area was surrounded by thirteen tanks (other accounts speak of 10 armoured cars) and, while the villagers stood together, the Israelis opened fire. He survived, though wounded, by hiding under corpses and then crawling off under cover of night, finding a donkey and riding it to Maroun for surgery.

In an earlier interview Aoun said the villagers were summoned from a crier to assemble in the village square in front of a mosque. Two Israeli officers sipped coffee as the locals gathered. The crowd was then asked to hand over their weapons, and then the Arabic-speaking officer turned to converse with his troops, after which machine guns on top of the armoured cars opened fire and killed some 70 villagers. The corpses were left to rot for four days, and then Israeli bulldozers came and piled them into the mosque, which was then blown up with explosives. Many villagers hoped to return, waiting nearby in Lebanese villages with relatives, but they ended up settling in the Tyre suburb of Shabriha.

After the assault was over, the remaining inhabitants of the village were expelled, forming part of the Palestinian exodus of 1948. Nahmani, speaking of the 67 men and women gunned down in the village square, asked himself in his papers: 'Where did they come by such a measure of cruelty, like Nazis? . . Is there no more humane way of expelling the inhabitants than by such methods?'.

Salman Abu-Sitta, author of the Atlas of Palestine, estimated that the number of Palestinian refugees from Saliha in 1998 was 7,622 people.

=== Israel ===
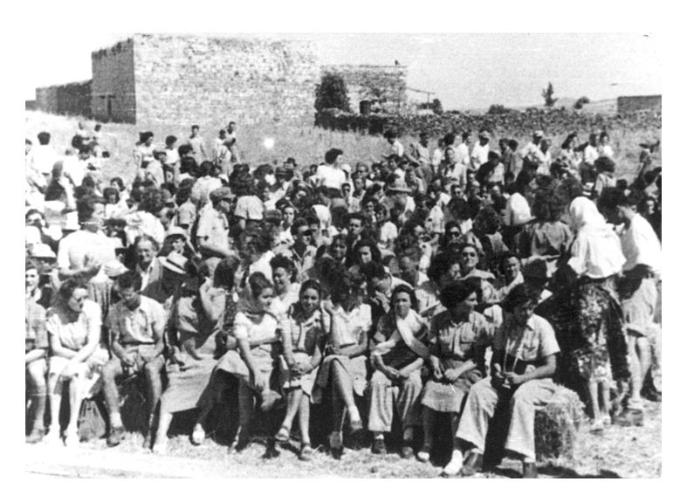
Ceremony marking the establishment of Kibbutz Yiron. Saliha 20 May 1949

The Israeli Jewish localities of Yir'on and Avivim are located on the former lands of Saliha.

Of what remains of Saliha's built structures today, Walid Khalidi writes that, "The only remaining landmark is a long building (which may have been a school) with many high windows. The site is a flat, mostly cultivated area. The bulk of the surrounding land is planted by Israeli farmers with apple trees."

== See also ==
- Shia villages in Palestine
- Depopulated Palestinian locations in Israel
- Killings and massacres during the 1948 Palestine War

== Bibliography ==
- Agreement between His Majesty's Government and the French Government respecting the Boundary Line between Syria and Palestine from the Mediterranean to El Hámmé, Treaty Series No. 13 (1923), Cmd. 1910.
- Biger, Gideon (1989), Geographical and other arguments in delimitation in the boundaries of British Palestine, in "International Boundaries and Boundary Conflict Resolution", IBRU Conference, ISBN 1-85560-000-5, 41–61.
- Biger, Gideon (1995), The encyclopedia of international boundaries, New York : Facts on File.
- Biger, Gideon (2005), The Boundaries of Modern Palestine, 1840-1947. London: Routledge. ISBN 0-7146-5654-2.
- Conder, C.R.; Kitchener, H.H. (1881). The Survey of Western Palestine: Memoirs of the Topography, Orography, Hydrography, and Archaeology. Vol. 1. London: Committee of the Palestine Exploration Fund.
- Department of Statistics (1945). Village Statistics, April, 1945. Government of Palestine.
- Franco-British Convention on Certain Points Connected with the Mandates for Syria and the Lebanon, Palestine and Mesopotamia, signed Dec. 23, 1920. Text available in American Journal of International Law, Vol. 16, No. 3, 1922, 122–126.
- Frankel, Rafael (2005-03-21). "Yir'on l Report". Hadashot Arkheologiyot – Excavations and Surveys in Israel (117). Archived from the original on 2011-07-19.
- Gil-Har, Yitzhak (1993), British commitments to the Arabs and their application to the Palestine-Trans-Jordan boundary: The issue of the Semakh triangle, Middle Eastern Studies, Vol.29, No.4, 690-70 1.
- Gelber, Y. (2006). Palestine 1948: War, Escape And The Emergence Of The Palestinian Refugee Problem. Sussex Academic Press. ISBN 1-84519-075-0.
- Hadawi, S. (1970). Village Statistics of 1945: A Classification of Land and Area ownership in Palestine. Palestine Liberation Organization Research Centre. Archived from the original on 2018-12-08.
- Khalidi, W. (1992). All That Remains: The Palestinian Villages Occupied and Depopulated by Israel in 1948. Washington D.C.: Institute for Palestine Studies. ISBN 0-88728-224-5.
- Mills, E, ed. (1932). Census of Palestine 1931. Population of Villages, Towns and Administrative Areas. Jerusalem: Government of Palestine.
- McTague, John (1982), Anglo-French Negotiations over the Boundaries of Palestine, 1919–1920, Journal of Palestine Studies, Vol. 11, No. 2, 101–112.
- Moore, Dahlia; Aweiss, Salem. (2004) Bridges Over Troubled Water: A Comparative Study Of Jews, Arabs, and Palestinians. Praeger/Greenwood. ISBN 0-275-98060-X
- Morris, B. (2004). The Birth of the Palestinian Refugee Problem Revisited. Cambridge University Press. ISBN 978-0-521-00967-6. (pp. 473, 481, 484, 486, 501, 502)
- Palmer, E.H. (1881). The Survey of Western Palestine: Arabic and English Name Lists Collected During the Survey by Lieutenants Conder and Kitchener, R. E. Transliterated and Explained by E.H. Palmer. Committee of the Palestine Exploration Fund.
- Rogan, E. (2007). The War for Palestine: Rewriting the History of 1948. Cambridge: Cambridge University Press. ISBN 978-0-521-87598-1.
- Yusuf, Muhsin (1991), The Zionists and the process of defining the borders of Palestine, 1915–1923, Journal of South Asian and Middle Eastern Studies, Vol. 15, No. 1, 18–39.
- US Department of State, International Boundary Study series: Iraq-Jordan, Iraq-Syria, Jordan-Syria, Israel-Lebanon.
