= Samuel Benezra =

Israeli defense official

- שמואל בן עזרא
- Benezra in 2026

National Security Advisor of Israel and head of the National Security Council
- Incumbent
- Assumed office 1 June 2026
- Preceded by: Gil Reich (acting); Tzachi Hanegbi

Personal details
- Born: 1973 (age 52–53) Jerusalem, Israel
- Citizenship: Israel
- Children: 12
- Relatives: Michael Ben Ezra (brother); Hananel Ben Ezra (brother)
- Education: Jerusalem College of Technology; Hebrew University of Jerusalem; Open University of Israel; University of Haifa; Tel Aviv University; Israel National Defense College
- Occupation: Defense official, engineer
- Awards: Israel Defense Prize
- Military career
- Allegiance: Israel
- Branch: Israeli Navy; Directorate of Defense Research and Development; Shin Bet
- Rank: Major general-equivalent (Shin Bet position, as described by the Prime Minister's Office)
- Commands: Technology, Operations and Cyber Division, Shin Bet

Samuel Benezra (Hebrew: שמואל בן עזרא) is an Israeli defense official and engineer who has served since June 2026 as head of the National Security Council and national security adviser to the prime minister of Israel.

Benezra has held senior positions in the Israeli defense establishment in the fields of research and development, missile defense, cyber capabilities, technological intelligence and defense technology. He served in the Israeli Navy, the Directorate of Defense Research and Development of the Israeli Ministry of Defense, and the Shin Bet. He was among the leading figures in the development of the Arrow 3 interceptor, a project that received the Israel Defense Prize in 2017.

== Early life ==
Benezra was born in Jerusalem in 1973 to Naomi and David Ben Ezra, who immigrated to Israel from Morocco. He grew up in Jerusalem and attended Himmelfarb High School.

== Education ==
Benezra holds a bachelor's degree in applied physics, with distinction, from the Jerusalem College of Technology, which he completed in 1994. He also holds a master's degree in applied physics from the Hebrew University of Jerusalem, completed in 2006.

In 2014, he completed an MBA, with distinction, at the Open University of Israel. In 2018, he completed a further master's degree in political science, specializing in national security, at the University of Haifa. He is also a graduate of the Israel National Defense College, where he was described in Israeli media as an outstanding cadet of his cohort.

== Defense career ==
=== Israeli Navy and Ministry of Defense ===
Benezra began his service in the Israel Defense Forces through the Atuda program, in which he was trained as an engineering physicist. After completing his studies, he was assigned to the Israeli Navy as an electro-optics engineering officer. In the navy he worked on research and development related to protecting naval vessels against electro-optical threats and headed an optronic anti-missile team.

In May 2015, Benezra was appointed head of upper-tier systems in the Homa administration of the Directorate of Defense Research and Development, with the rank of colonel. In this role he was involved in the development of missile and interceptor systems. Israeli media later reported that he served as system engineer for the seeker head of the Arrow 3 missile and subsequently led the department responsible for upper-tier interceptor development programs.

=== Arrow 3 and missile-defense development ===
Benezra was one of the senior Israeli officials involved in the development of Arrow 3, the exo-atmospheric layer of Israel's missile-defense system. In media coverage during his service in the Ministry of Defense, he was identified only by the initial of his first name and his image was blurred, due to security restrictions at the time.

The Arrow 3 project received the Israel Defense Prize in 2017, with Benezra reported among the recipients for his contribution to the project. The Arrow 3 system was developed jointly by Israel's Israel Missile Defense Organization and the United States Missile Defense Agency, with major successful tests conducted in Israel and in Alaska.

Hebrew-language sources have also described Benezra as one of the leading figures in the development of the Sparrow missile family during his service in the Homa administration. The Sparrow family includes the Blue Sparrow missile; The Daily Telegraph described Blue Sparrow as a jet-launched ballistic missile capable of reaching the edge of space before re-entering toward its target.

=== Shin Bet ===
In September 2020, Benezra was appointed head of the Technology, Operations and Cyber Division of the Shin Bet, Israel's domestic security agency. He served in the position for four years, until October 2024. The Prime Minister's Office described the position as equivalent to the rank of major general.

In that role, he was responsible for technological and cyber capabilities, including projects in advanced technology, cyber, artificial intelligence and technological intelligence, in cooperation with research and development bodies and Israel's defense industries. Israeli media reported that the division under his command was involved in technological and intelligence capabilities used during the Israel–Hamas war.

== National Security Council ==
On 31 May 2026, Prime Minister Benjamin Netanyahu announced his decision to appoint Benezra as head of the National Security Council and national security adviser to the prime minister. Netanyahu's office said that Benezra brought more than 30 years of experience in Israeli security, technology and cyber fields, as well as experience working with United States government officials and other international bodies.

The Israeli government unanimously approved his appointment on 7 June 2026. He succeeded Gil Reich, who had served as acting national security adviser after Tzachi Hanegbi left the position in October 2025.

== Awards and recognition ==
Benezra received the IDF Chief of Staff's technological award for excellence in the field of technology in 2001. During his service in the Israeli Navy, he received the Navy Commander's award for creative thinking three times, in 1999, 2008 and 2009.

In 2017, the Israel Defense Prize was awarded to the developers of the Arrow 3 weapon system, including Benezra. Hebrew-language sources have also reported that the Shin Bet technology and cyber division that he headed received Israel Defense Prizes in 2023, 2024 and 2025 for technological and intelligence systems.

== Personal life ==
Benezra is married to Shifra, daughter of Rabbi Benjamin Eisner. They have twelve children. During the Israel–Hamas war, Hebrew media reported that five of his children were serving as regular soldiers and two in the reserves.

His father, Rabbi Professor David Ben Ezra, taught physics and electro-optics at the Jerusalem College of Technology for approximately fifty years and has served as a community rabbi in Jerusalem.

His brother Michael Ben Ezra served as chief scientist and chief technology officer of the technological division of the Israeli Ground Forces. Another brother, Hananel Ben Ezra, was reported to be among the leading figures in the development of Iron Beam, also known in Hebrew as Or Eitan, and was also awarded the Israel Defense Prize.

== See also ==
- National Security Council (Israel)
- National Security Advisor (Israel)
- Arrow 3
- Sparrow (target missile)
- Missile Defense Agency
- Israel Defense Prize
- Shin Bet
