= Yir'on =

Kibbutz in northern Israel

Yir'on: יִרְאוֹן (Hebrew)
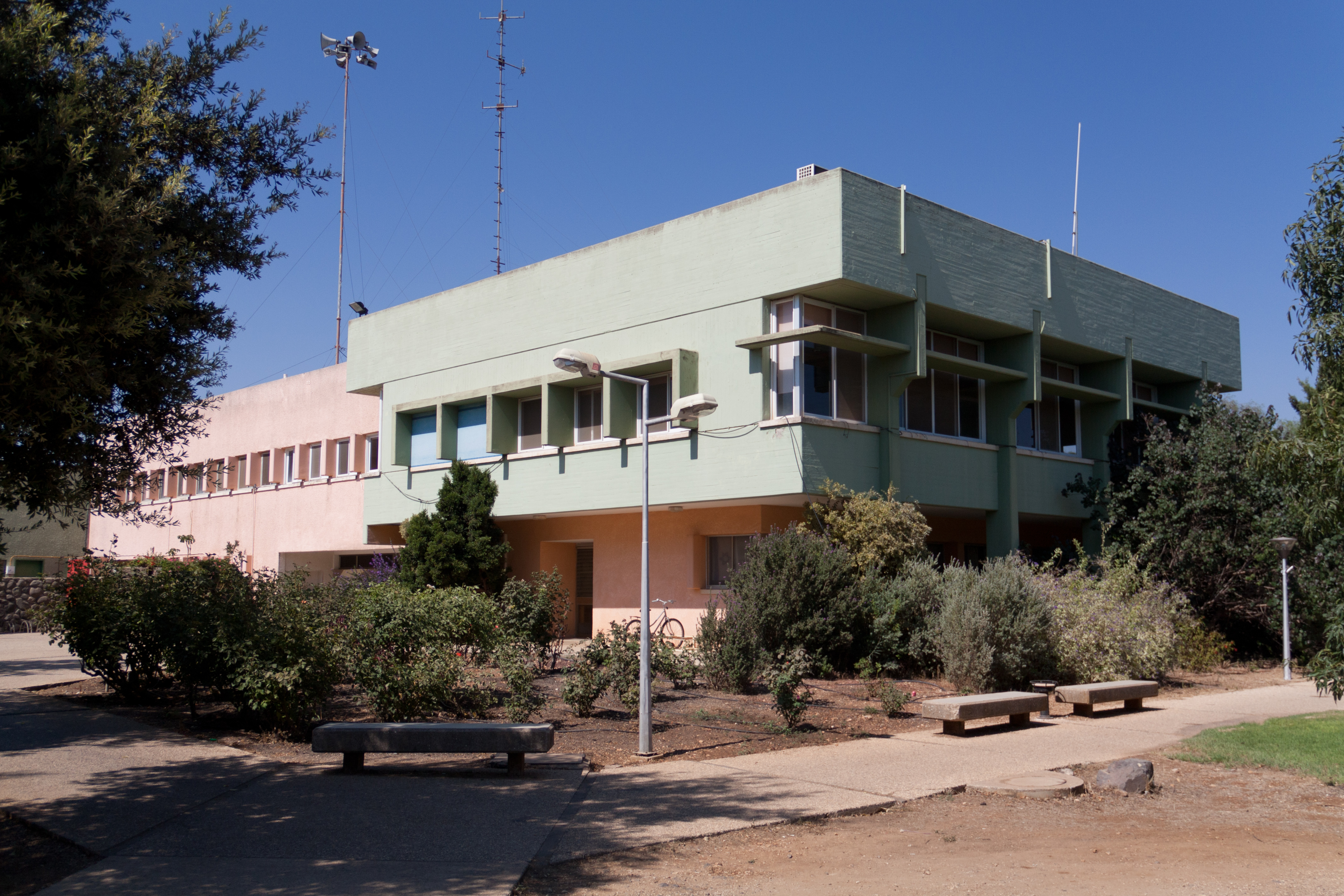

- Location within Northeast Israel Location within Israel
- Coordinates: 33°4′37″N 35°27′18″E
- Country: Israel
- District: Northern
- Subdistrict: Acre
- Council: Upper Galilee
- Affiliation: Kibbutz Movement
- Founded: 20 May 1949
- Founder: Former Palmach members Dror-HeHalutz members
- Population (2024): 400
- Website: www.yiron.org.il

Yir'on (Hebrew: יִרְאוֹן) is a kibbutz in the Galilee Panhandle in northern Israel. Located adjacent to the Lebanese border, it falls under the jurisdiction of Upper Galilee Regional Council. In 2024 it had a population of 400.

== History ==
The village was established on 20 May 1949 by former members of the Palmach's Yiftach Brigade and graduates of the Dror–HeHalutz youth movement on the site of the depopulated Palestinian village of Saliha.

Ada Feinberg-Sireni, later a member of the Knesset, was amongst the founders. It was one of a series of villages established along the Lebanese border, with the intention of reinforcing the young state's borders. It was named after Iron, a biblical village of the Tribe of Naphtali (Joshua 19:38), which is commonly identified with Yaroun, a Lebanese village 3 kilometers to the west.

During the Gaza war, northern Israeli border communities, including Yir'on, faced targeted attacks by Hezbollah and Palestinian factions based in Lebanon, and were evacuated.

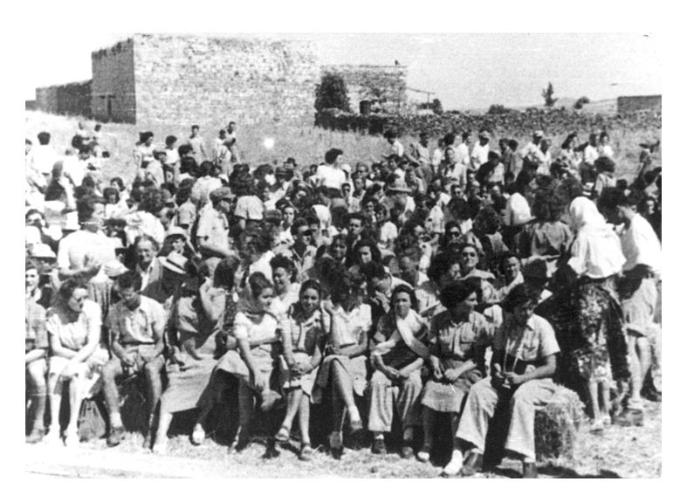
Ceremony marking the establishment of Kibbutz Yiron. Saliha 1949

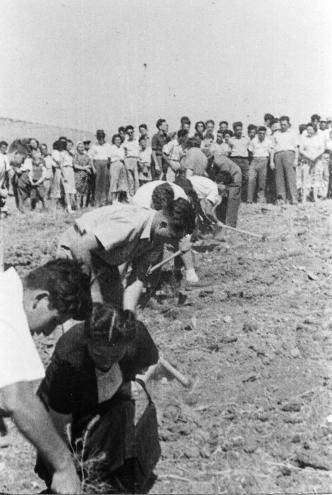
Former members of the Palmach planting a memorial grove at Yir'on. 1949

== Economy ==
The main income source is Paskal Technologies located in the Ma'alot-Tarshiha industrial zone. Other sources of income include a zipper factory (Paskal Zippers), field crops, fruit orchards (apples, pears, cherries and kiwis) and a furniture factory, Rehitay Yir'on, which specializes in ready-to-assemble furniture.

The kibbutz operates a petting zoo, where red deer, spotted deer, rabbits and chickens roam freely. Yir'on also rents out 38 guest houses to tourists.

In 2000 the Harei Hagalil Winery was established in partnership with the Ramat HaGolan Winery. The wine is produced from vineyards planted in the Galilee Mountains.

For many years the kibbutz has cultivated a botanical garden. On the grounds of the kibbutz is a 200-year old hackberry tree, which is considered holy in Islamic tradition.

== Notable people ==
- Dani Arditi (1951–2026) - military officer

== See also ==
- Nahal Yir'on
- Yir'on (Biblical city)
