= Ilan Mizrahi =

National Security Advisor to the Prime Minister of Israel

- אילן מזרחי
- Born: c. 1947 (age 78–79)
- Education: Tel Aviv University (B.A.); University of Haifa (M.A. in political science)
- Occupations: Former Mossad official; National Security Advisor
- Military career
- Allegiance: Israel
- Branch: Mossad
- Service years: 1972–2003
- Rank: Deputy Director

National Security Advisor (Israel)
- In office May 2006 – November 2007
- Prime Minister: Ehud Olmert
- Succeeded by: Dani Arditi

Ilan Mizrahi (Hebrew: אילן מזרחי; born c. 1947) is a former Mossad official and National Security Advisor to the Prime Minister of Israel.

== Education ==
Mizrahi attended Tel Aviv University as an undergraduate, and he earned a graduate degree in political science at the University of Haifa.

== Career ==
Mizrahi joined the Mossad in 1972. He became head of the human intelligence division. He served as the agency's deputy director from 2001 to 2003.

He was appointed Israel's National Security Advisor by Prime Minister Ehud Olmert in May 2006. He stepped down in November 2007.

Mizrahi is considered an Orientalist and speaks fluent Arabic.
