= Ada Feinberg-Sireni =

Israeli politician (1930–2025)

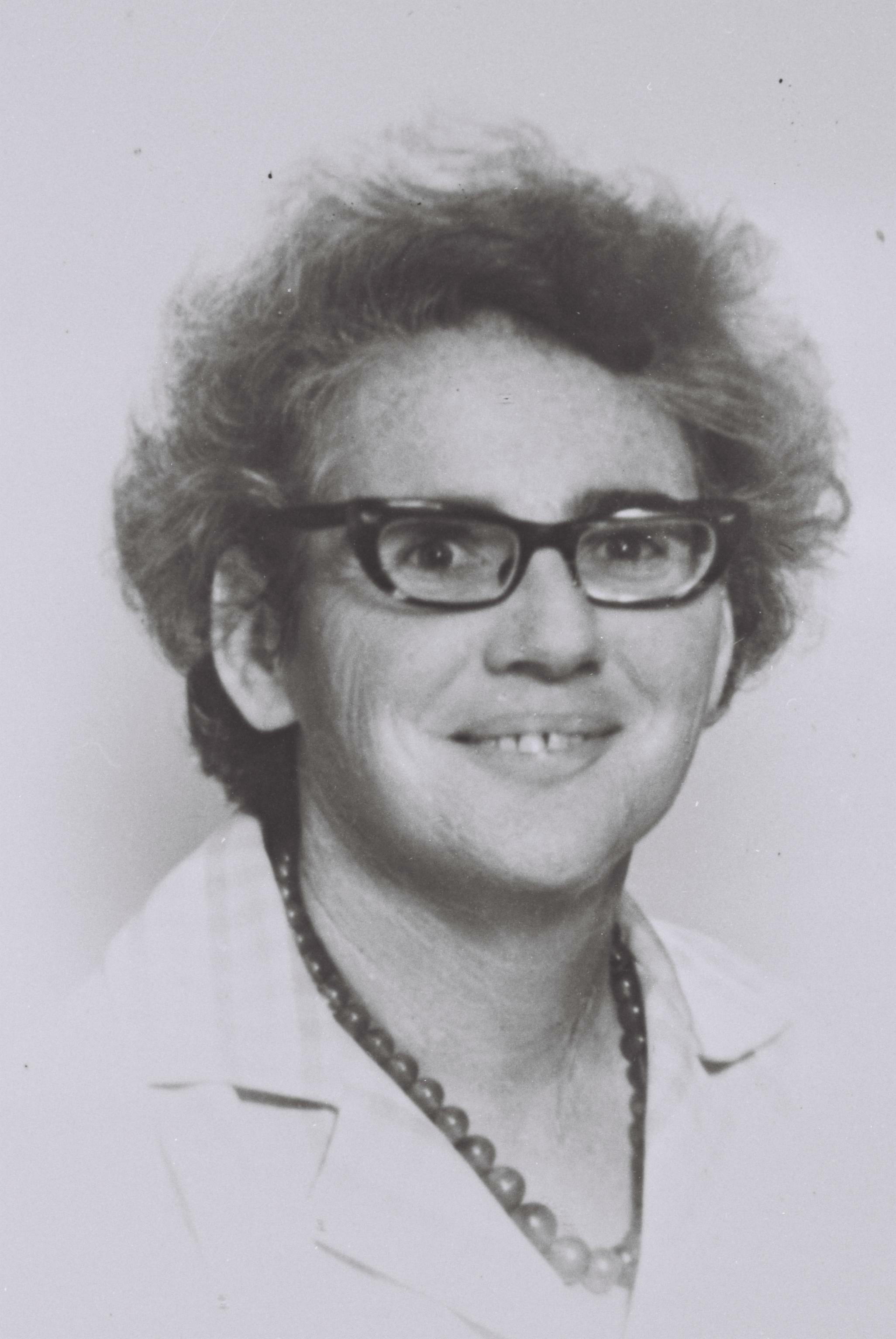
- Feinberg-Sireni in 1969

Faction represented in the Knesset
- 1969–1974: Alignment

Personal details
- Born: 22 April 1930 Rome, Italy
- Died: 4 November 2025 (aged 95) Yir'on, Israel

Ada Feinberg-Sireni (Hebrew: עדה פיינברג-סירני; 22 April 1930 – 4 November 2025) was an Israeli politician who served as a member of the Knesset for the Alignment between 1969 and 1974.

== Life and career ==
Born in Rome in Italy, Feinberg-Sireni emigrated to Mandatory Palestine in 1934. She was educated in Tel Aviv, and was a member of the Scouts training group established by the Palmach. In 1949 she was amongst the founding members of kibbutz Yir'on. She was a member of the HaKibbutz HaMeuhad movement, and later co-ordinated the youth section of the United Kibbutz Movement. She also worked as a teacher in the Anne Frank Regional School.

In 1969 she was elected to the Knesset on the Alignment list, but lost her seat in the 1973 elections.

Feinberg-Sireni died in kibbutz Yir'on on 4 November 2025, at the age of 95.
