= Tzachi Hanegbi =

Israeli politician (born 1957)

- צחי הנגבי
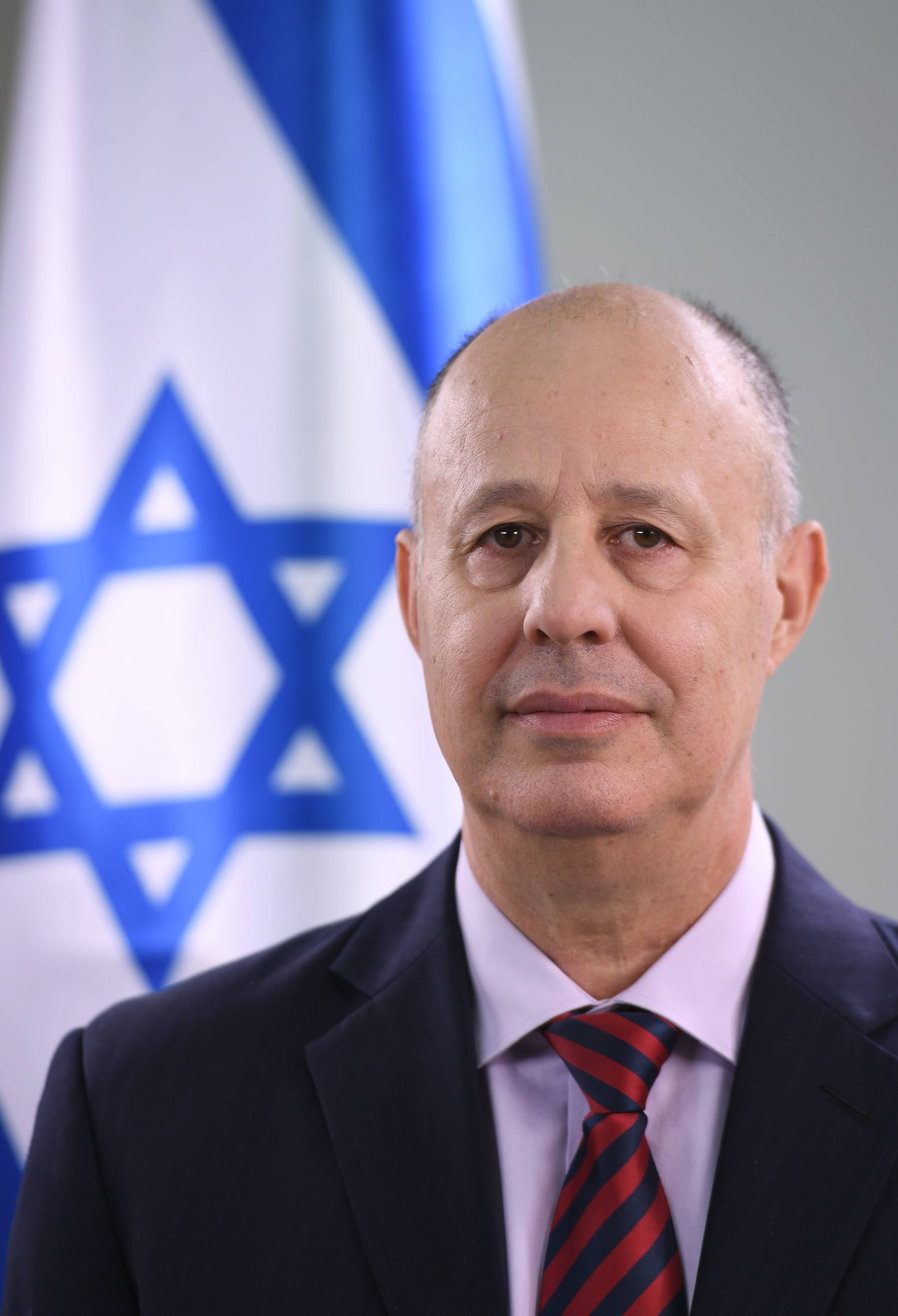

Ministerial roles
- 1996: Minister of Health
- 1996–1999: Minister of Justice
- 2001–2003: Minister of the Environment
- 2002–2003: Minister of Transportation
- 2003–2005: Minister of Internal Security
- 2004–2006: Minister in the Prime Minister's Office
- 2016: Minister in the Prime Minister's Office
- 2016–2020: Minister of Regional Cooperation
- 2017: Minister of Communications
- 2020: Minister of Agriculture
- 2020: Minister in the Prime Minister's Office
- 2020–2021: Minister of Community Affairs

Faction represented in the Knesset
- 1988–2005: Likud
- 2006–2010: Kadima
- 2013–2022: Likud

Personal details
- Born: 26 February 1957 (age 69) Jerusalem, Israel
- Education: Hebrew University of Jerusalem

Tzachi Hanegbi (Hebrew: צחי הנגבי; born 26 February 1957) is an Israeli politician and national security expert who served as Israel's National Security Advisor from 2023 to 2025. A member of Likud, Hanegbi previously served as Minister of Agriculture and Rural Development, Minister of Regional Cooperation and Minister of Community Affairs.

He served as Minister of Justice, Minister of Internal Security, Minister of Intelligence and Nuclear Affairs, and Minister in the Prime Minister's office supervising Israel's intelligence agencies Mossad and Shin Bet. He was also responsible for overseeing Israel's Atomic Energy Agency and served as the minister in charge of Israel's strategic relationship and security dialogue with the United States. He also served as Deputy Minister of Foreign Affairs and as the Chairman of the Knesset Foreign Affairs and Defense Committee and Majority Leader of the Knesset.

Hanegbi was appointed by Prime Minister Benjamin Netanyahu to serve as acting prime minister of Israel, from 10 to 17 September 2017, while the prime minister traveled abroad.

He lost his seat in the Knesset in the 2022 Israeli legislative election. In January 2023, Hanegbi was appointed head of the National Security Council. On 21 October 2025, Prime Minister Netanyahu fired Hanegbi, effective immediately, from heading the National Security Council.

== Biography ==
Hanegbi was born in Jerusalem to Geulah Cohen, a prominent member of the 1940s underground group Lehi and later MK for Likud and Tehiya, and Emmanuel Hanegbi, the Operations Officer for the Lehi. After his military service in the paratroopers corps, Hanegbi studied international relations at the Hebrew University of Jerusalem. As president of the Hebrew University Student Union in 1980, he received a six-month suspended sentence for leading an attack on Arab students. Despite this incident, he became president of the National Union of Israeli Students later that year, holding that title until 1982. After his undergraduate studies, he went on to study law, obtaining an LL.B.

Hanegbi lives in Mevaseret Zion, a town on the outskirts of Jerusalem.

== Political career ==
Hanegbi was on the 37th spot on the Likud list and first elected to the Knesset in the 1988 elections, and headed the Prime Minister's Bureau under Yitzhak Shamir. He retained his seat in the 1992 and 1996 elections, and was initially appointed Minister of Health in Binyamin Netanyahu's government, becoming Minister of Justice in September 1996 and dropping the health portfolio in November that year.

He lost his ministerial portfolio after Ehud Barak won the 1999 elections, but returned to government when Ariel Sharon won the special election for PM in 2001. Hanegbi was appointed Minister of the Environment in March 2001, adding the Transportation portfolio to his duties later in the year.

After Likud's convincing win in the 2003 elections, Hanegbi was appointed Minister of Internal Security. In September 2003 he was appointed by Prime Minister Ariel Sharon as minister in the Prime Minister's Office in charge of Israel's intelligence agencies – the Mossad and Shin Bet, and supervised Israel's Atomic Energy Agency.

When Sharon broke away to form Kadima in November 2005, Hanegbi was appointed interim chairman of Likud. On the following day, Hanegbi announced that he was also switching to Kadima, and resigned from the Knesset on 10 December. However, he reappeared in the Knesset in April 2006 after winning a seat in the 2006 elections. From May 2006 until December 2010 Hanegbi served as the Chairman of the Knesset's Security and Foreign Affairs Committee.

Placed fourth on the party's list, he retained his seat in the 2009 elections.

=== Trial ===
In July 2010, after a four-year trial for election bribery, fraud and breach of trust, Hanegbi was cleared of all charges by a Jerusalem court. However, the three-judge panel found him guilty of perjury. The case stems from Hanegbi's denial that he was behind an ad boosting his appointments of Likud party's political activists to positions in the Ministry of the Environmental Protection. The judges verdict cleared Hanegbi of any criminal wrongdoing, accepting the defense's argument that such appointments were not illegal prior to 2004, and that this was the common practice among all cabinet members in all the previous governments since Israel's independence. The court ruled that selectively prosecuting Hanegbi for what was a widespread and common practice was wrong and unfair. Hanegbi was urged by his legal team to appeal the perjury conviction to Israel's High court of Justice. Following the verdict, several prominent leaders and officials publicly defended Hanegbi. Former Knesset Speaker Avraham Burg who opposes Hanegbi politically, has called for the firing of the prosecutor by the Attorney General.

On 9 November 2010, the Jerusalem court fined Hanegbi 10,000 NIS, and in a 2-to-1 decision imposed moral turpitude to the offense. Hanegbi therefore suspended himself from the Knesset and from his position as Chairman of the Foreign Affairs and Defence Committee, pending his legal appeal. His seat was taken by Nino Abesadze.

=== Return to Likud ===
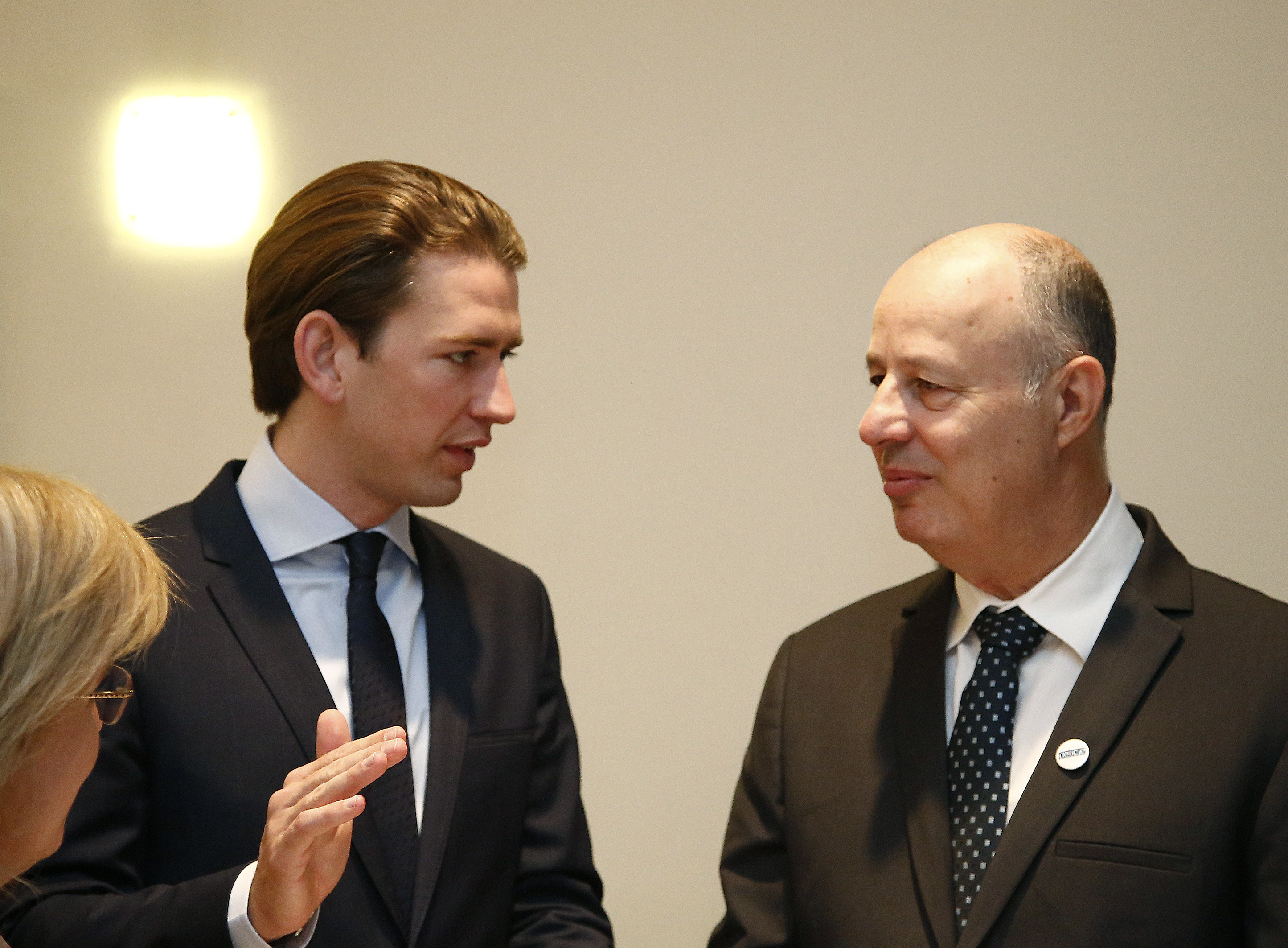
Hanegbi with Austrian Chancellor Sebastian Kurz, 2016

Hanegbi resigned from Kadima and returned to Likud when Kadima decided to leave the short-lived unity government in July 2012. Hanegbi explained that he believed Kadima's decision to quit the unity government was irresponsible, and motivated by short-term political goals. Following his decision, Hanegbi was re-elected on the Likud list in the January 2013 elections. In June 2014 he was appointed Deputy Minister of Foreign Affairs.

On 30 May 2016 Hanegbi was appointed Minister without portfolio in the Fourth Netanyahu Cabinet, dealing with issues concerning defense and foreign affairs.

On 2 June 2016 Hanegbi denied allegations that he intentionally wrote a report on Operation Protective Edge that cleared the Israeli government of all wrongdoing. He was appointed Acting Minister of Communications in February 2017, a post he held until being replaced by Ayoob Kara in May.

On 27 December 2022, Netanyahu appointed Hanegbi as head of the National Security Council. Netanyahu fired him on 21 October 2025, reportedly due to disagreements over the Gaza war. His deputy, Gil Reich, immediately replaced him as the council's acting director until the appointment of permanent head of the National Security Council, Shmuel Ben Ezra.

On 19 October 2026, Hanegbi announced that he was planning to vote for Avigdor Lieberman in the 27 October election.

== See also ==
- List of Israeli public officials convicted of crimes or misdemeanors
