= List of Gaza war protests at universities in the United States in 2024 =

List of pro-Palestinian protests on university campuses in the United States in 2024
- Part of Gaza war protests (in the US • at universities (in 2024))
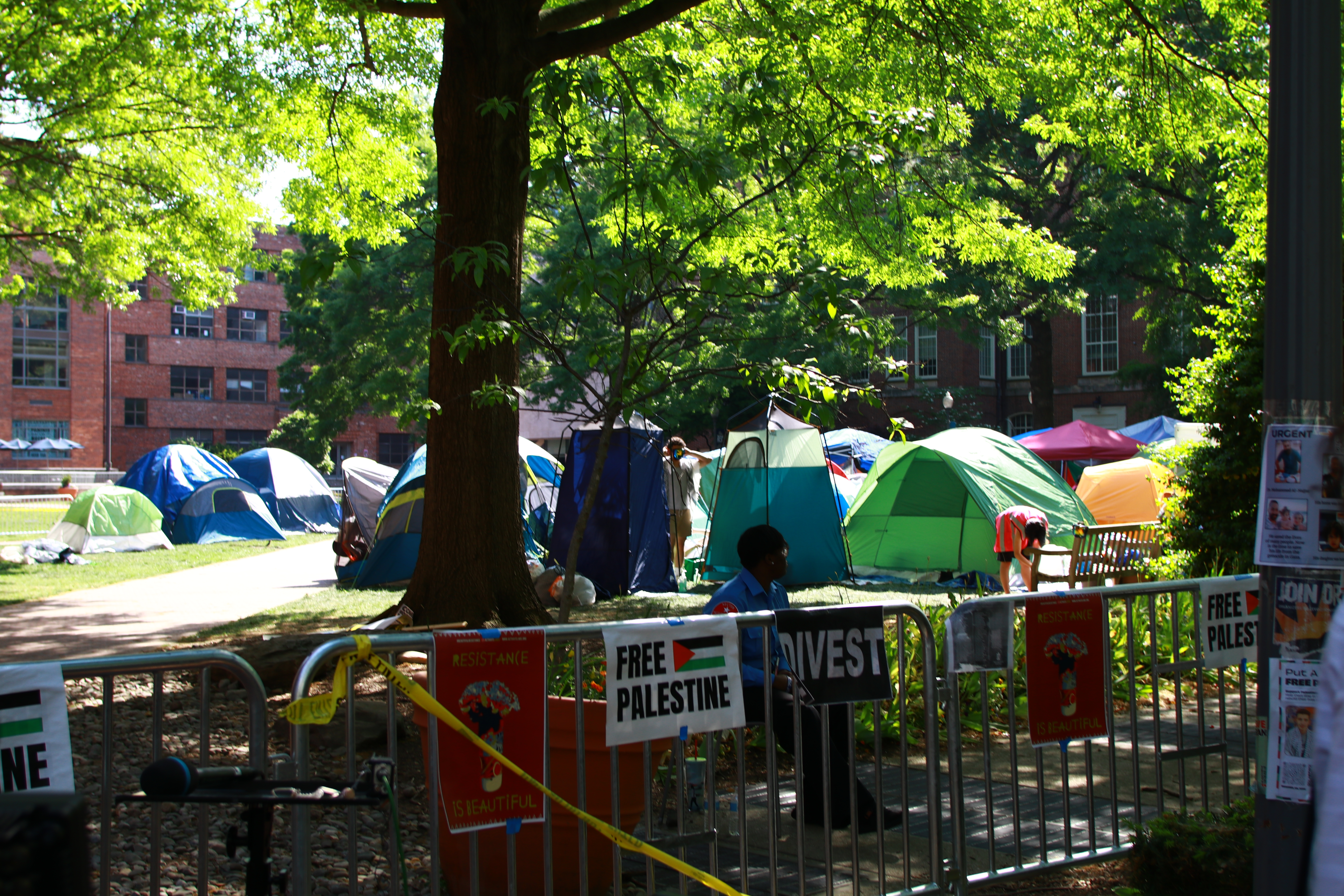
- George Washington University, April 28, 2024
- Date: April 17, 2024 – July 2024 (3 months and 4 days)
- Location: United States
- Goals: Universities divestment from Israel
- Methods: Protests; Civil disobedience; Occupation; Lawsuit; Picketing; Stand-up strikes; Hunger strike; Civil disorder

This is a list of pro-Palestinian protests on university campuses in the United States in 2024 since protests escalated on April 17, beginning with the Gaza Solidarity Encampment at Columbia University. Student protests, including encampments, occupations, walkouts or sit-ins, have occurred in 45 out of 50 states and the District of Columbia, occurred on almost 140 U.S. campuses as of May 6, part of an international protest movement in over 25 countries. In the three weeks following April 17, over 2,950 people were arrested in relation to Gaza solidarity protests at universities in the US, including students as well as community members and alumni.

Demonstrations initially spread in the United States on April 22, when students at several universities on the East Coast—including New York University, Yale University, Emerson College, the Massachusetts Institute of Technology (MIT), and Tufts University—began occupying campuses, as well as experiencing mass arrests in New York and at Yale. Protests emerged throughout the U.S. in the following days, with protest camps established on over 40 campuses. On April 25, mass arrests occurred at Emerson College, the University of Southern California, and the University of Texas at Austin.

A continued crackdown on April 27 led to approximately 275 arrests at Washington, Northeastern, Arizona State, and Indiana University Bloomington. Several professors were among those detained at Emory University, and at Washington University in St. Louis, university employees were arrested. On April 28, counter-protests were held at MIT, the University of Pennsylvania, and the University of California, Los Angeles (UCLA). On April 30, approximately 300 protesters were arrested at Columbia University and City College of New York; and pro-Israel counter-protesters attacked the UCLA campus occupation. The following day over 200 arrests were made at UCLA.

Hundreds of arrests ensued in May, notably (Note: As defined by CNN map of "Campus protests where arrests have been made since April 18", highlighting schools with 45 or more total arrests.) at the Art Institute of Chicago, University of California, San Diego, the Fashion Institute of Technology in New York, and University of California, Irvine. On May 20, the first strike by academic workers took place on campuses in California at UC Santa Cruz, followed by UC Davis and UCLA on May 28.

== Background ==
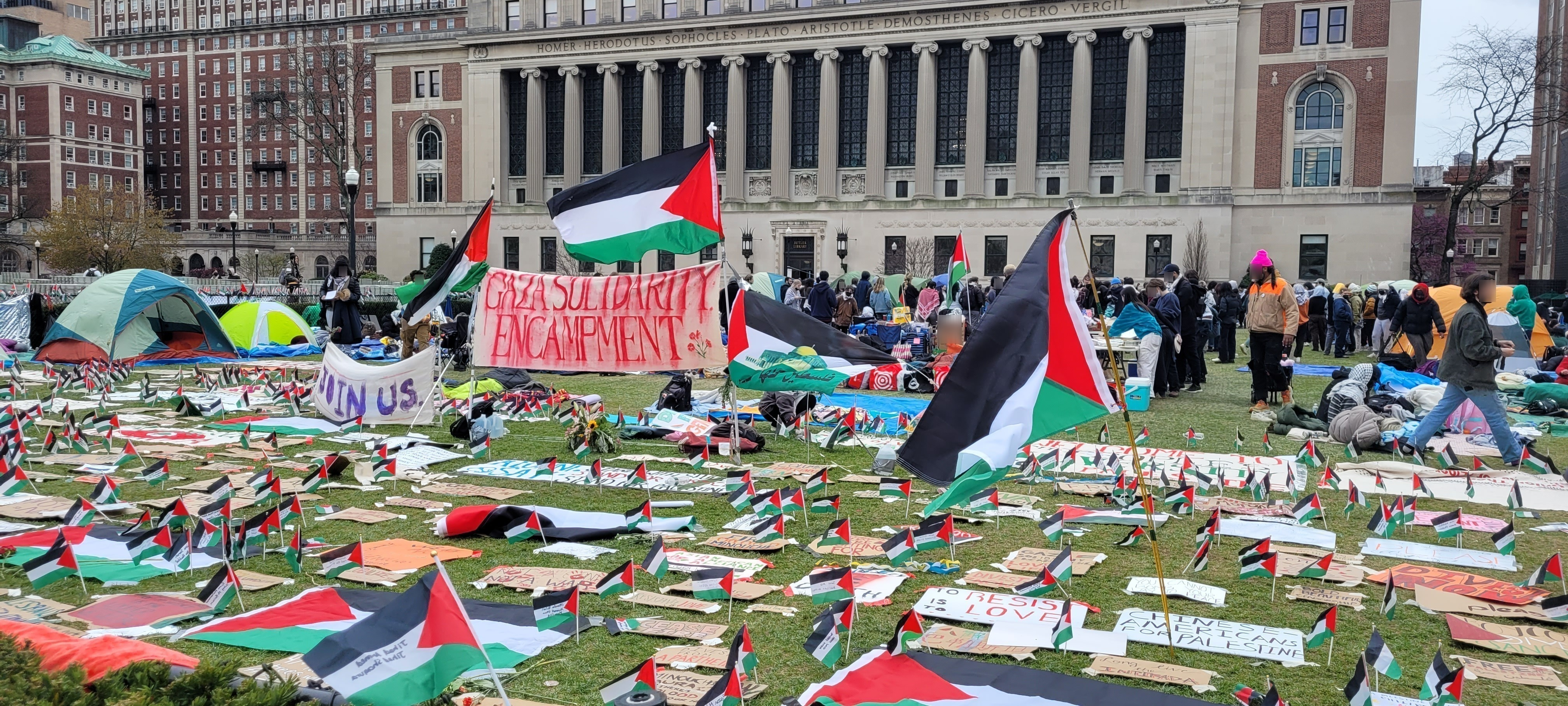
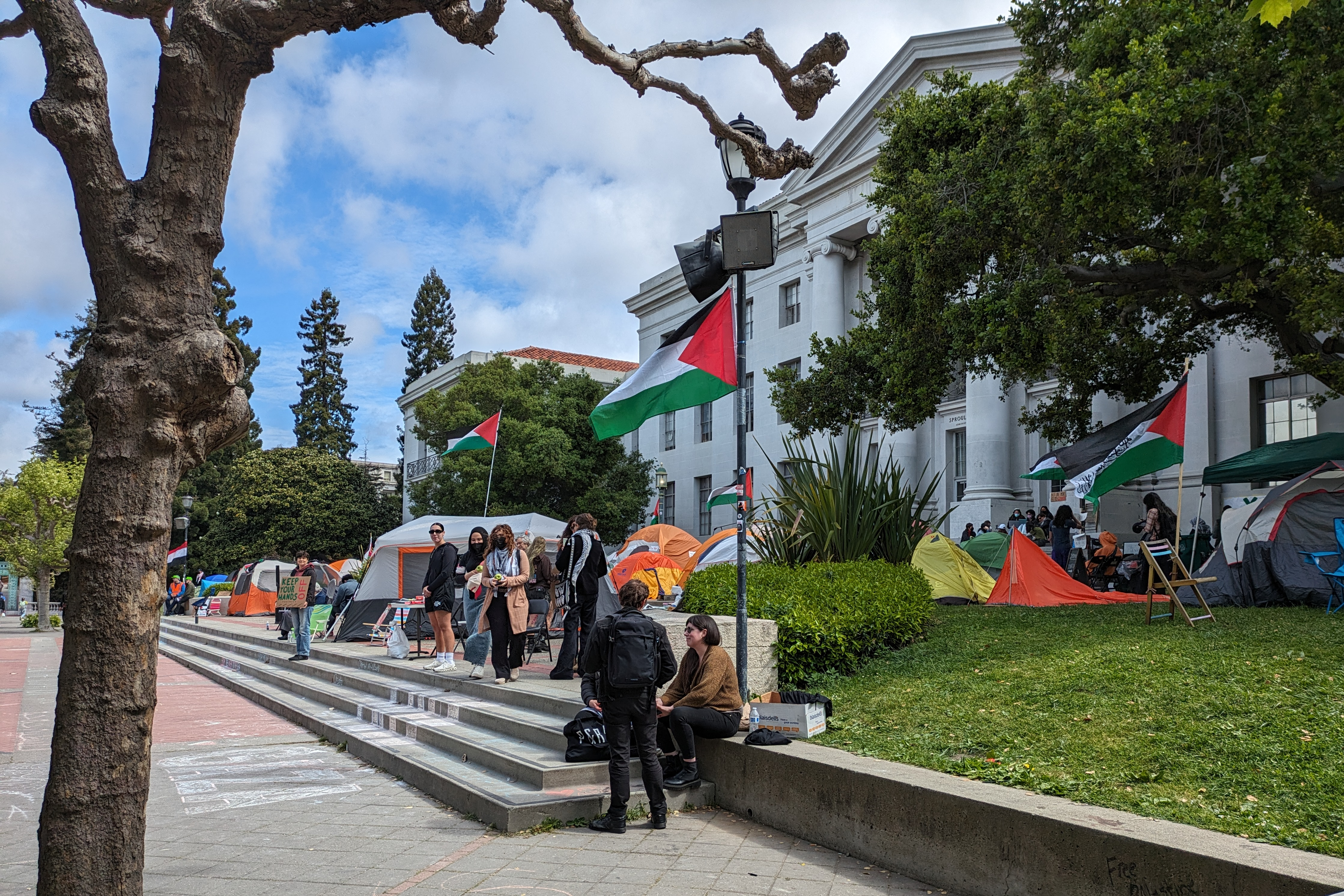
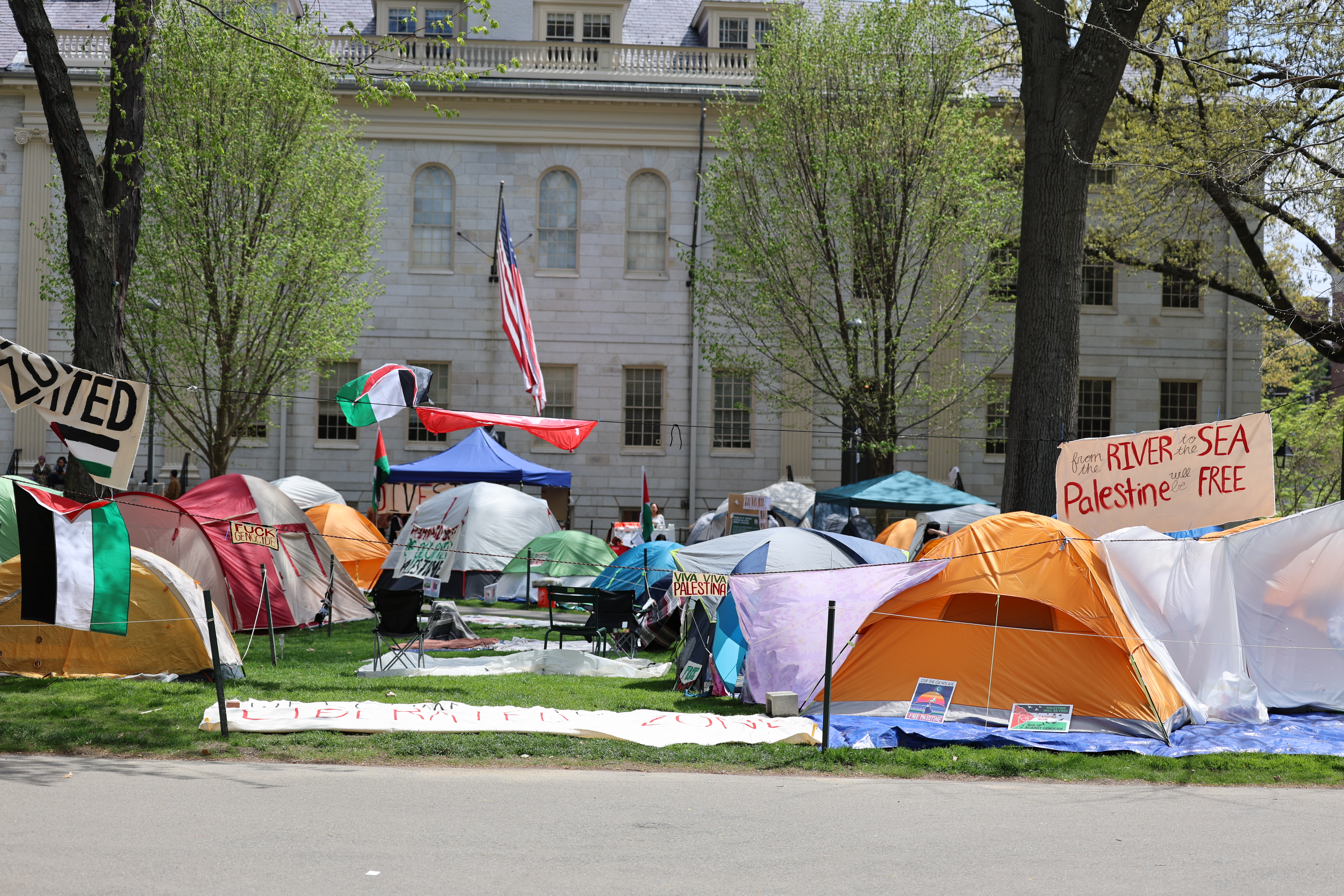
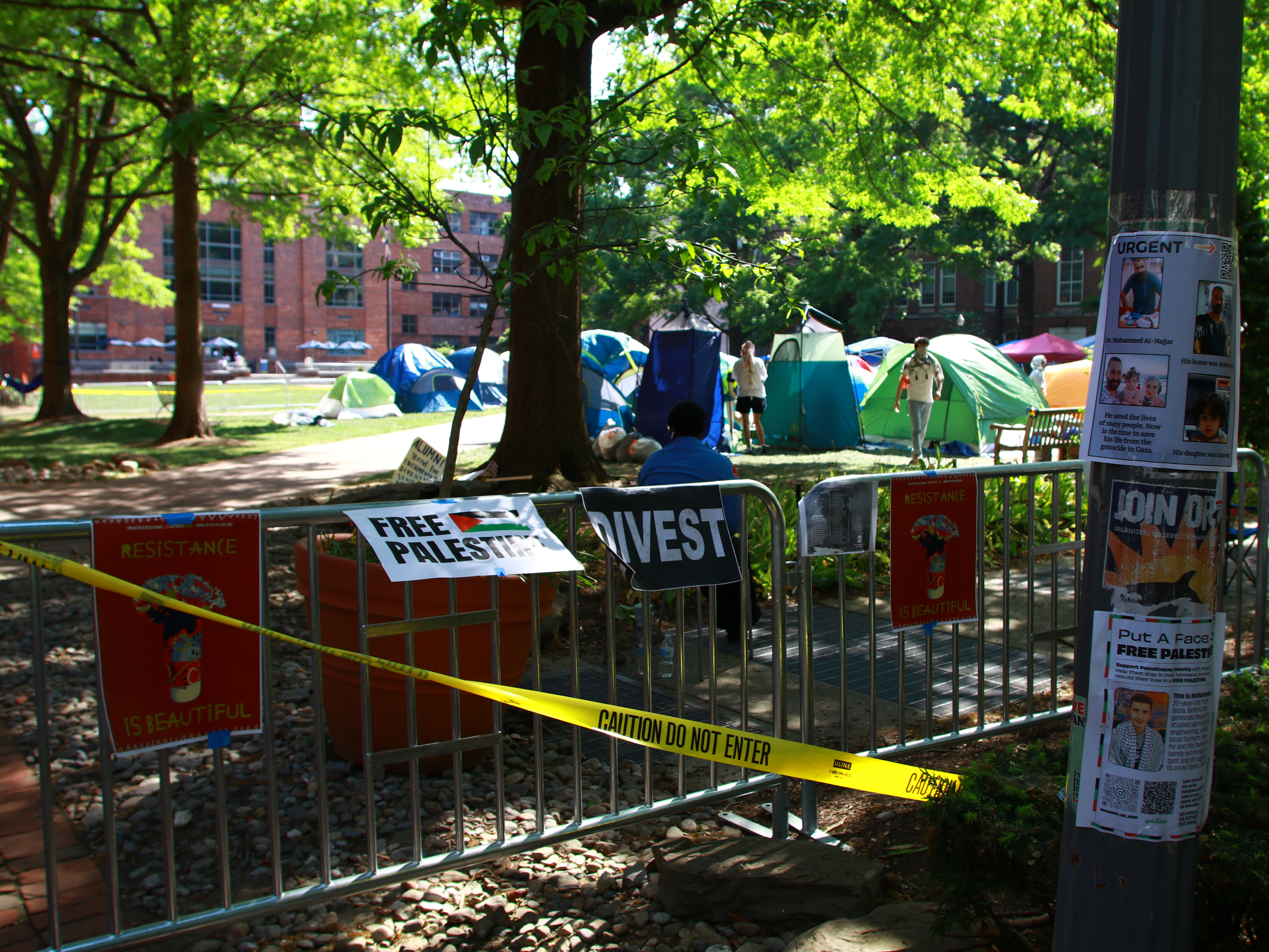
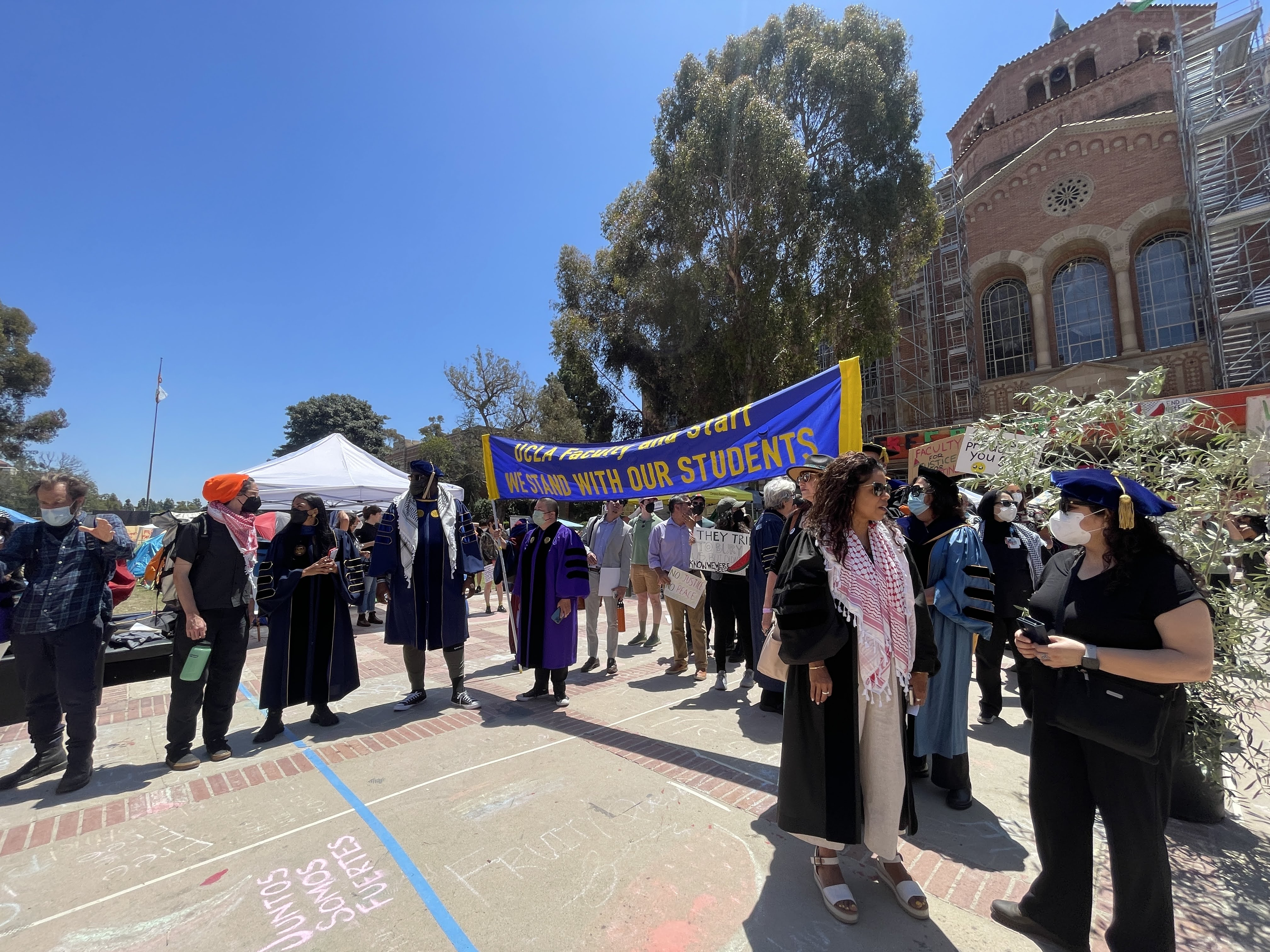
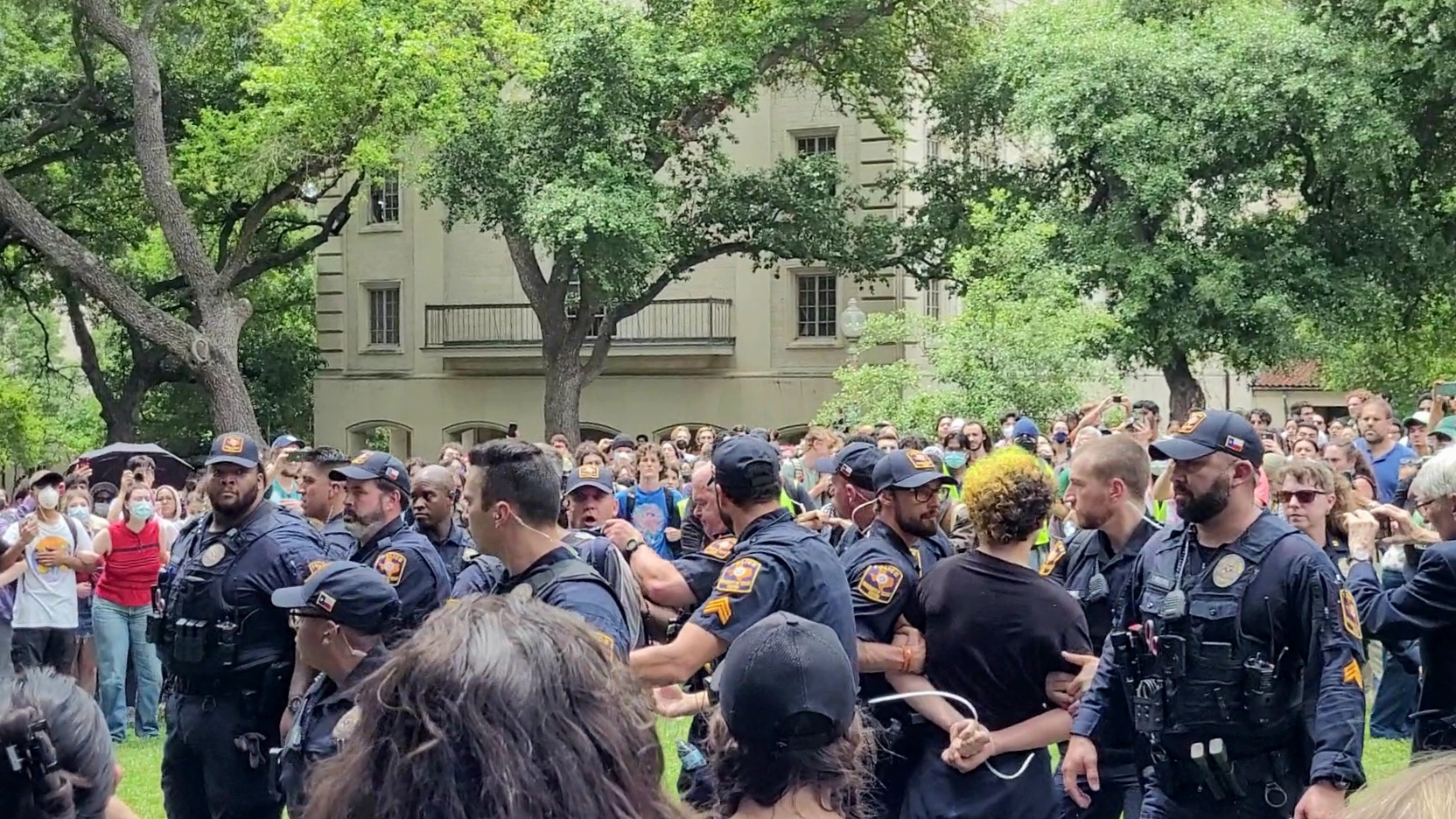
Clockwise from top:
- Columbia University
- University of California, Berkeley
- Harvard University
- George Washington University
- University of California, Los Angeles
- University of Texas, Austin

By May 6, 2024, student protests had occurred in 45 of the 50 states in the United States and the District of Columbia, with encampments, occupations, walkouts or sit-ins on almost 140 campuses. Thirty-four encampments were established in the United Kingdom; across universities in Australia, beginning with the University of Sydney; and in Canada, including an encampment at McGill University. On May 7, protests spread further on European campuses after mass arrests at the University of Amsterdam campus occupation, including occupation of campus buildings at Leipzig University in Germany, Sciences Po in France, and Ghent University in Belgium. By May 8, protests had taken place in more than 25 countries, and on May 13, approximately 1,000 Dutch students and university staff took part in a national walk-out.

== Alabama ==
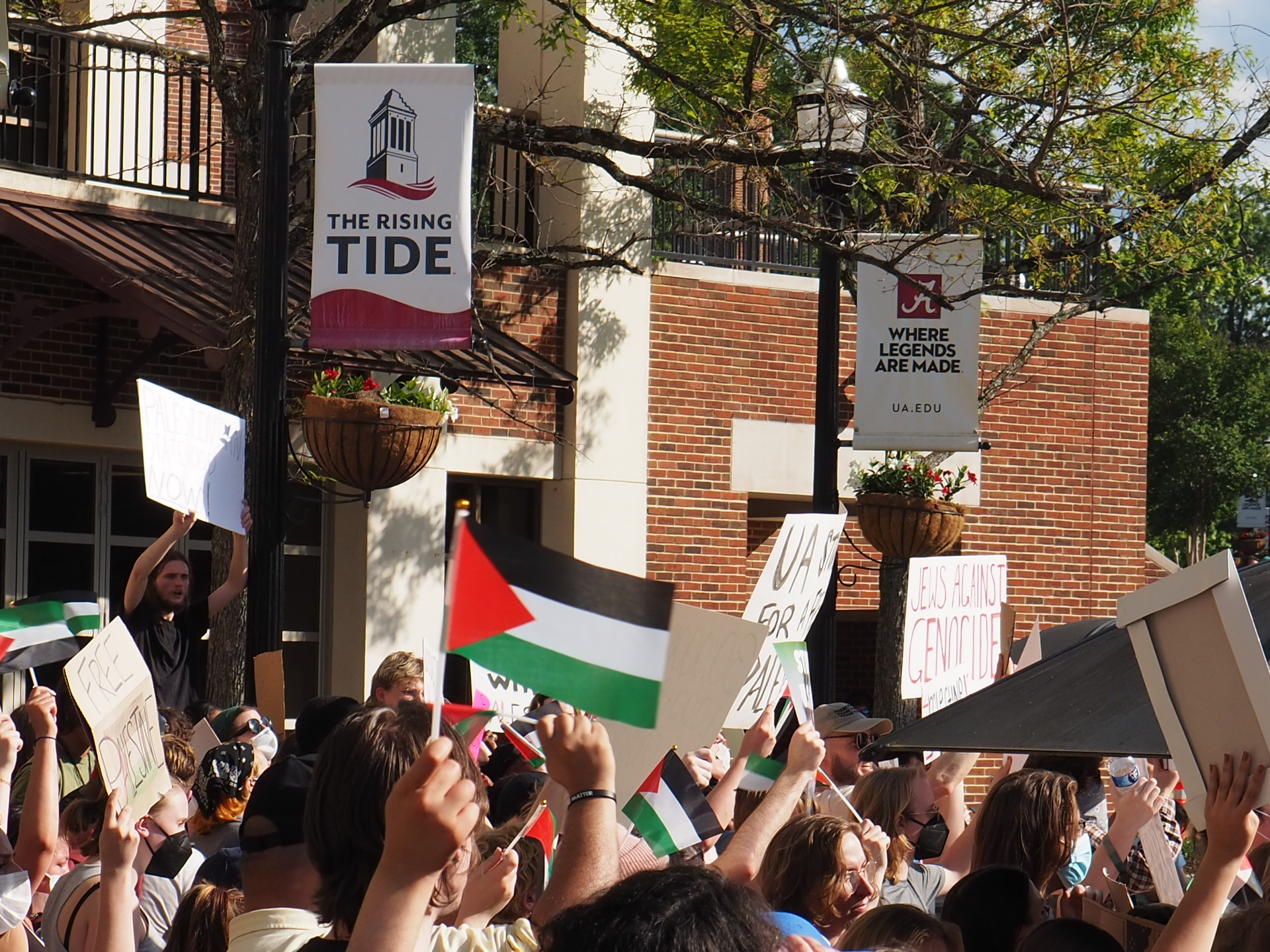
Pro-Palestinian protest at University of Alabama, May 1, 2024

The pro-Palestinian protest at the University of Alabama took place on May 1 from 4 to 6:30pm at the UA Student Center. Hundreds of protesters showed up on the pro-Palestinian side, with around a hundred of so counter-protesters holding Israeli and American flags. The demands of the pro-Palestinian protesters was to cut ties with Lockheed Martin, the renaming of Hewson Hall, named after former Lockheed Martin CEO Marillyn Hewson, and the disclosure of investments from UA's endowment fund. The Lockheed Martin website deleted the mention of UA as a partner university before the protest; one of the several demands published by the protest's organizers.

The protest ended peacefully at 6:30, and there were no injuries.

On October 6, a counter-protester at Auburn University assaulted a pro-Palestinian protester shortly following a protest.

== Arizona ==
On April 26, dozens gathered to protest on the Old Main lawn at Arizona State University in Tempe. Campus police announced several people were arrested "for setting up unauthorized encampment, in violation of university policy and the ABOR Student Code of Conduct." On April 27, the Arizona State University Police Department arrested 69 protesters after the unauthorised encampment was established on campus.

On April 25, a protest was held at the University of Arizona in Tucson. An encampment was set up on April 29.

On April 30, an encampment was set up at Northern Arizona University in Flagstaff. Within the same night, the university and Flagstaff Police Departments made 24 arrests and deconstructed the site.

On May 9, police fired tear gas at demonstrators at the University of Arizona, a day in advance of their scheduled commencement ceremony.

== Arkansas ==
On April 25, members of the University of Arkansas Students for Justice in Palestine organization delivered a letter to the school's administration, calling for action in response to the war.

A protest was held in Conway, Arkansas on May 1. Around 50-60 people gathered at Hendrix College before marching to Conway City Hall.

== California ==
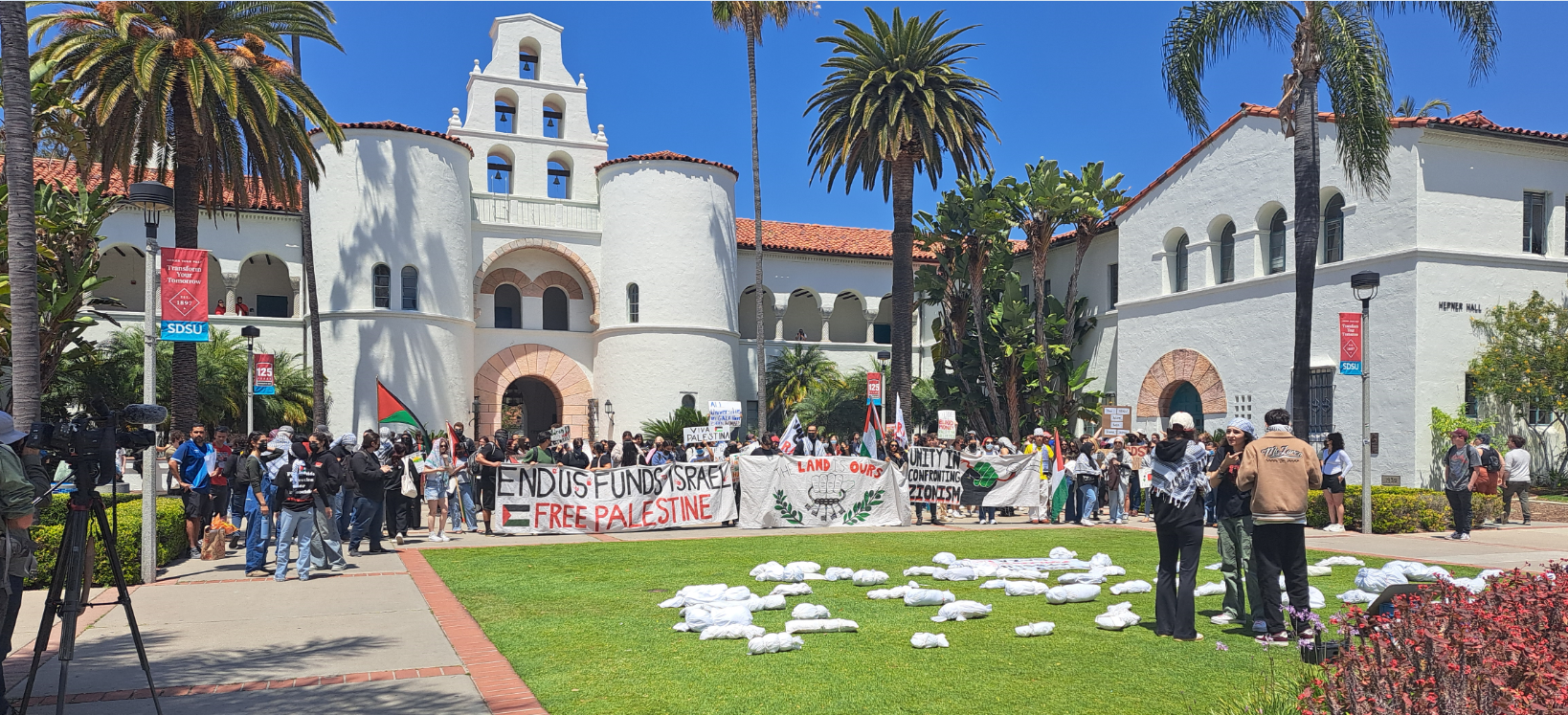
San Diego State University, April 30, 2024

This is a list of pro-Palestinian protests on university campuses in California in 2024 since protests escalated at the Columbia University campus occupation on April 17. Campus protests initially spread the following week to Cal Poly Humboldt, UC Berkeley, and USC. On April 25, encampments and protests spread further to multiple universities; UCLA. UC Santa Barbara, UC Irvine, Stanford, and at Sonoma State the following day. On April 29, encampments were set up at San Francisco State, Sacramento State, UC Riverside, and Occidental College; and at UC San Diego and at the University of San Francisco on April 30.

In May, United Auto Workers local labor union authorized a stand-up strike against the University of California (UC) system alleging unsafe labor practices and violations of civil rights against the workers it represents. The first strike began on May 20 at UC Santa Cruz and expanded to other campuses weekly until a judge issued a restraining order on June 7.

In August, just before the opening of the fall semester, Cal State, UC and other universities instituted broad new policies banning encampments, barricades and overnight demonstrations in response to the events.

== Colorado ==
On April 22, a Colorado State University event with Senator Michael Bennet and former Senator Cory Gardner, moderated by university president Amy Parsons, was interrupted by pro-Palestinian protesters.

Protesters from the University of Colorado Denver, Community College of Denver, and Metropolitan State University set up an encampment at the Tivoli Quad on the shared Auraria Campus. Police detained several protesters.

Protests were also held at other colleges in Colorado. On April 29, rallies were held at Colorado State University and the University of Northern Colorado. On April 30, protests were held at the University of Denver and Colorado State University Pueblo. On May 1, a die-in was held at the University of Colorado Boulder and a walk-out was held at Colorado College.

An encampment was set up at Colorado College on May 2.

On May 9, an encampment was set up at the University of Denver. On May 10, a protest was held at Colorado Mesa University.

On May 15, police issued citations for trespassing, interference and disturbing the peace to 22 protesters who refused to leave buildings at Auraria. On May 17, campus officials announced that all buildings would be locked at 6pm on Friday. Protesters scattered their tents across campus, saying: “This whole campus is now an encampment.”

== Connecticut ==
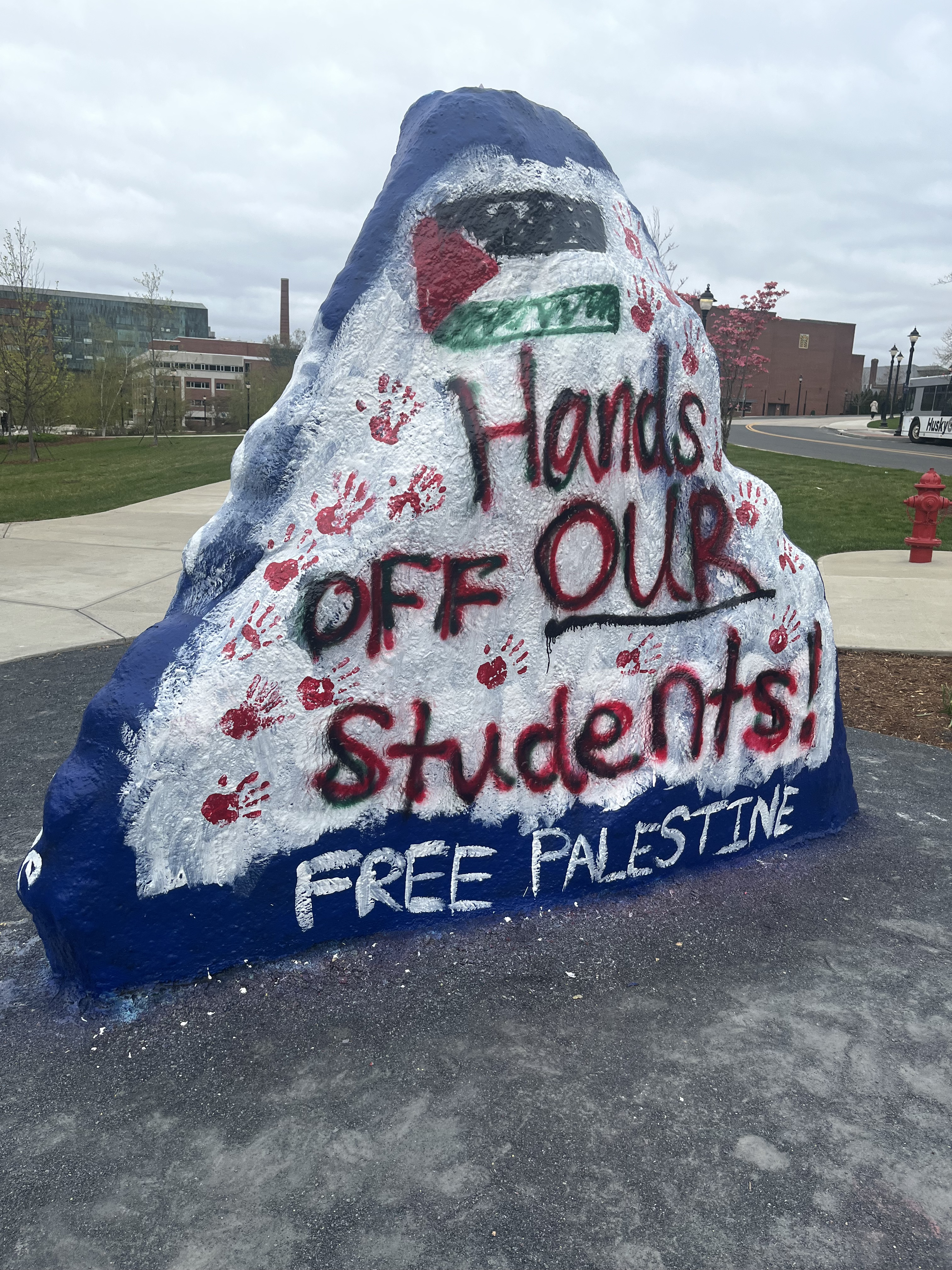
A rock at the University of Connecticut, painted in response to the arrest of protesters on April 30

On April 12, at Yale University, ahead of the university's Bulldog Days, when admitted freshmen would be visiting, a group of graduate students conducted a hunger strike to call attention to the university's investment in weapons manufacturers profiting off of the war in Gaza. On April 15, a separate group of student protesters, under the name "Occupy Beinecke", unsuccessfully attempted to erect a bookshelf reading "Books, Not Bombs" on Beinecke Plaza and maintained a daytime occupation of the plaza for the rest of the week. On April 19, during a send-off dinner for university president Peter Salovey in the abutting Schwarzman Center, Occupy Beinecke launched a three-day tent encampment on the plaza until April 22 when police arrested 48 protesters on charges of trespassing. Yale administrators claimed that arrests were because students failed to leave after a warning that the protest posed "a safety violation". A letter signed by 300 Yale faculty stated the decision to charge the students "contradicts the institution's commitment to uphold free assembly, speech and expression". On April 28, more than 1,000 pro-Palestinian protesters organized a "March for a Free Palestine" from the New Haven Green through Yale's campus. That same day, another group of protesters erected a second, short-lived encampment on Cross Campus that was cleared by police with no arrests on April 30.

On April 25, an encampment was launched at the University of Connecticut in Storrs. One person was arrested. Five days later, university police arrested multiple people and dismantled the encampment.

On April 28, another encampment was set up at Wesleyan University in Middletown. On April 29, about 100 people were at the encampment, called a "Liberation Zone." University President Michael S. Roth said that he would not call in the police as long as the protest remained nonviolent.

On May 1, an encampment was set up at Trinity College in Hartford.

A protest was held at Central Connecticut State University on April 17. On May 7, a protest rally was held at Connecticut College.

== District of Columbia ==
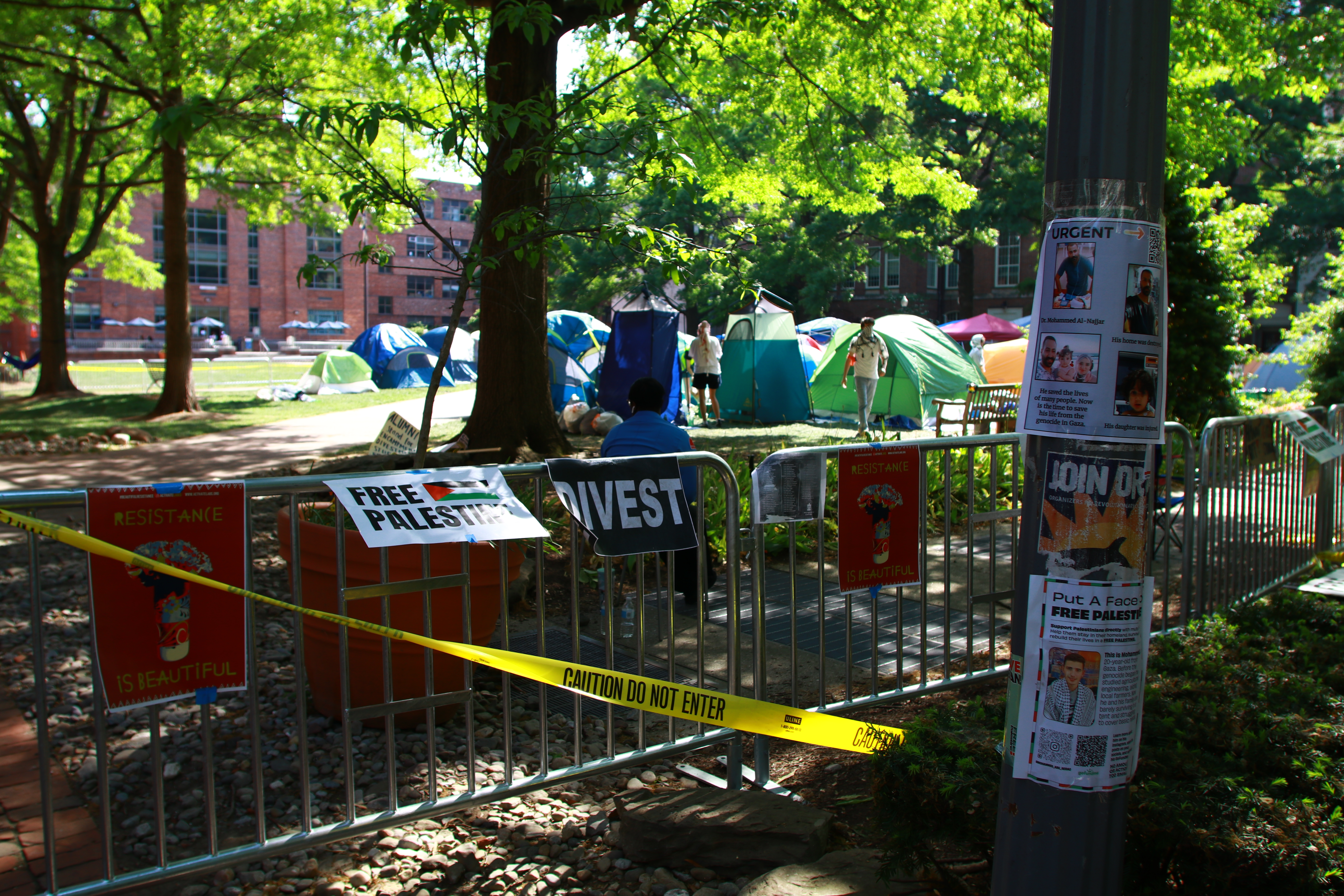
George Washington University encampment, April 28, 2024

A walkout occurred at American University in Washington, D.C. on April 23, 2024. On April 25, students from Georgetown University and George Washington University established a joint encampment in response to the International Court of Justice's ruling that Israel has violated the Genocide Convention. At 5:30 am, about 70 students set up 25 tents at University Yard. The campus police arrived at 6 am and informed them that they were only allowed to be on campus between 7 am and 7 pm. Around noon, 200 students took part in a rally. At 1 pm, 150 more marchers arrived at the encampment. At 2:30 pm, counter-protesters arrived. Protesters were joined by Howard University, George Mason University, University of Maryland, Baltimore County, and Gallaudet University students. The Washington Post reported that the Metropolitan Police Department rejected an April 26 request from GWU officials to clear the site. By April 28, the encampment had spread past the barricaded University Yard into the surrounding streets. On May 8, police, using pepper spray, cleared the encampment at George Washington University, arresting 33 people.

Protesters at Howard University held a sit-in on October 7, 2024.

== Florida ==
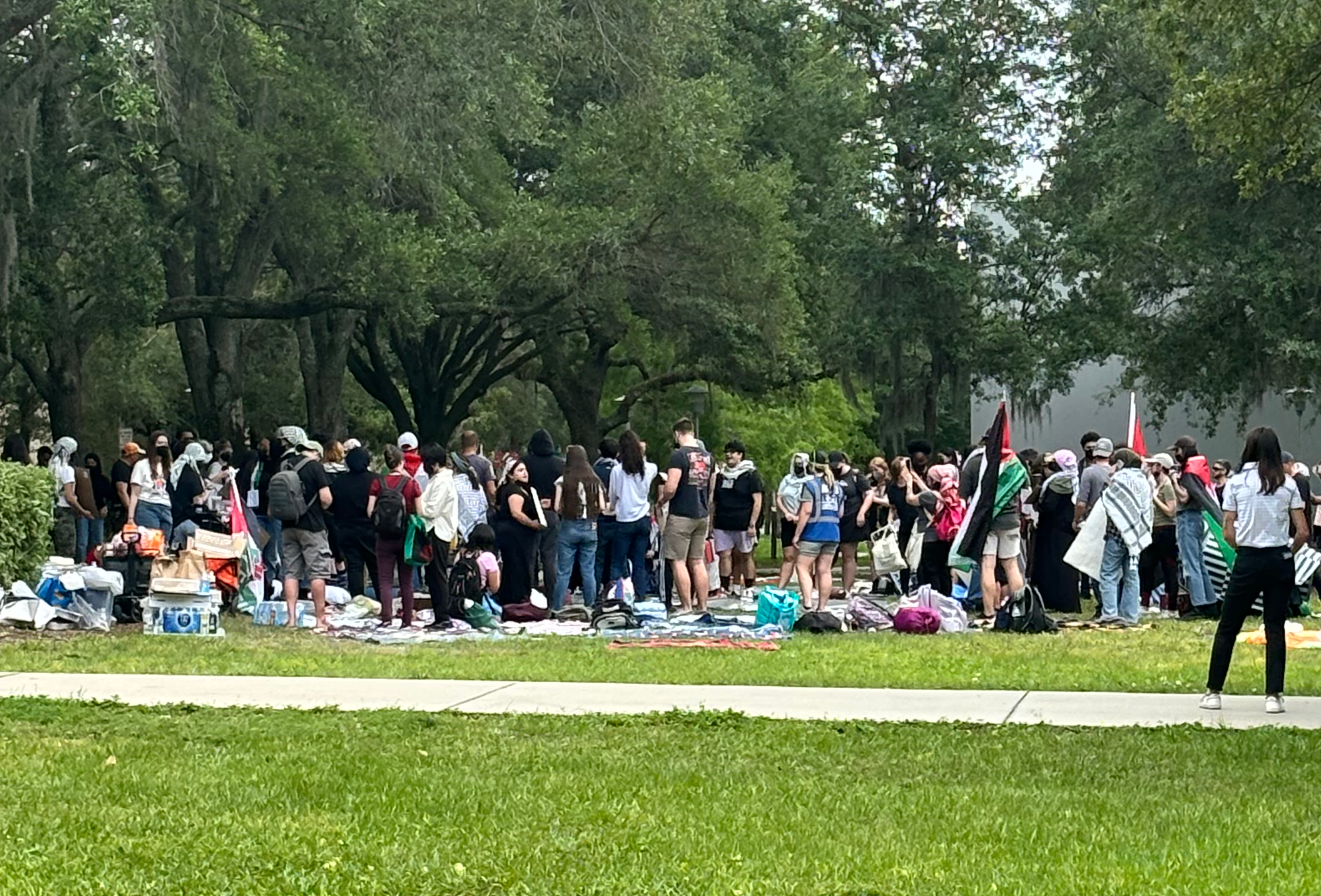
Group of Pro-Palestinian protestors at USF on April 30, 2024

On April 24, a protest organized by the "UF Divestment Coalition" took place at the Plaza of the Americas at the University of Florida in Gainesville. Nine people were arrested at another protest on April 29.

A protest was held at the University of Central Florida in Orlando on April 26. An encampment was set up on May 6.

A planned encampment on Landis Green at Florida State University in Tallahassee lasted only a few minutes on April 25 before being disbanded by university police and the use of sprinklers by school administration. On April 30 police arrested five protesters at another encampment on the FSU campus.

A protest was held at Florida Gulf Coast University on April 26.

Three people were arrested at a protest and encampment at the University of South Florida in Tampa on April 29. The following day, 10 people were arrested following a physical altercation between police and protesters. Police officers used tear gas on protesters.

An encampment organized by Students for a Democratic Society was set up at the University of North Florida in Jacksonville on April 30. Late on May 2, sixteen demonstrators, including eight students were arrested by University Police and charged with trespassing.

On May 15, a vigil and protest was held at Florida Atlantic University. The same day, a protest was held at Florida International University.

On May 17, protesters at the New College of Florida's graduation ceremony chanted "Free Palestine" and booed the commencement speaker, billionaire Joe Ricketts. The school said it had filed five conduct violation complaints against graduates.

== Georgia ==
Students at the Georgia Institute of Technology held a pro-Palestine rally on April 24. The next day, students at Kennesaw State University participated in a walkout. A second walkout was held on May 1, with around 100 students from the Savannah College of Art and Design's Atlanta campus also participating.

On the morning of April 25, police arrested demonstrators at an encampment at Emory University. Students had established the encampment that morning in solidarity with the people of Gaza as well as in protest of Cop City. Georgia State Patrol, Atlanta Police and University Police began clearing the encampment within three hours of its establishment. Tasers on restrained students and tear gas were used to arrest at least 20 students. Caroline Fohlin, the chair of Emory's philosophy department, was one of the arrested. A video of police using a taser on a restrained protester at Emory went viral, but vice president of public safety Cheryl Elliott said the person did not appear to be associated with Emory. Elliot also sent an email to the Emory community saying that "chemical irritants" were necessary for crowd control due to direct assaults of officers. On 27 April, faculty placed themselves between police and students, leading Representative Ruwa Romman to say, "it never should've been necessary".

On April 29, police arrested 16 people at an encampment at the University of Georgia.

On May 1, a protest was held at Mercer University. The next day, protests were held at Georgia Southern University's main campus in Statesboro and the Armstrong Campus in Savannah. A protest was held at Georgia State University on May 3.

On May 8, protesters at Morehouse College demonstrated against President Biden in response to his scheduled commencement speech at the university. Several protesters from neighboring Spelman College were also present.

== Illinois ==
On April 22, students at Loyola University in Chicago held a protest. On April 30, a protest was held at Northern Illinois University.

Hundreds of University of Illinois Urbana-Champaign students rallied on April 24 to demand the university divest from BlackRock. On April 26, the university announced that the group had 30 minutes to remove its tents. After 45 minutes, one person who was not a student was arrested for interfering with university staff's attempt to take the tents down.

On April 25, students at Northwestern University established an encampment on the south campus of the school's Evanston campus. Several dozen students started the encampment; and the crowd grew to over 1,000 by Thursday evening. In response to the protests, the university declared an interim addendum to the student code of conduct prohibiting tents from being erected on campus. On April 29, Northwestern made an agreement with the protestors, in which most tents would be dismantled in exchange for the reestablishment of an Advisory Committee on Investment Responsibility and increased inclusivity efforts on campus.

On April 26, students from the University of Chicago, the School of the Art Institute of Chicago, Columbia College Chicago, and Roosevelt University held a protest march and called for the universities to cut ties with Israel. Three days later students established an encampment on the University of Chicago campus. On May 7, police cleared the University of Chicago encampment.

On April 30, an encampment was set up at DePaul University. On May 16, police dismantled the encampment at DePaul. University president Robert Manuel stated that “the responses to the encampment have inadvertently created public safety issues that put our community at risk,” and the occupiers of the encampment were not to blame for their disbursal.

On May 1, an encampment was set up at Illinois State University. Two days later, police arrested seven protesters in an administration building.

A small encampment was set up at Southern Illinois University Carbondale on May 1. Three days later, a protest was held at Southern Illinois University Edwardsville in response to a professor who had been injured by police at Washington University.

Police arrested dozens of people at the School of the Art Institute of Chicago on May 4 as demonstrators set up an encampment.

On June 1, dozens of graduates walked out of the commencement ceremony at University of Chicago to protest the withholding of diplomas from four students involved in the solidarity encampment. At least one person was arrested.

On October 11, about 80 protesters participated in a walkout at University of Chicago. Less than an hour later, police wearing riot gear used batons and pepper spray against the protesters.

== Indiana ==
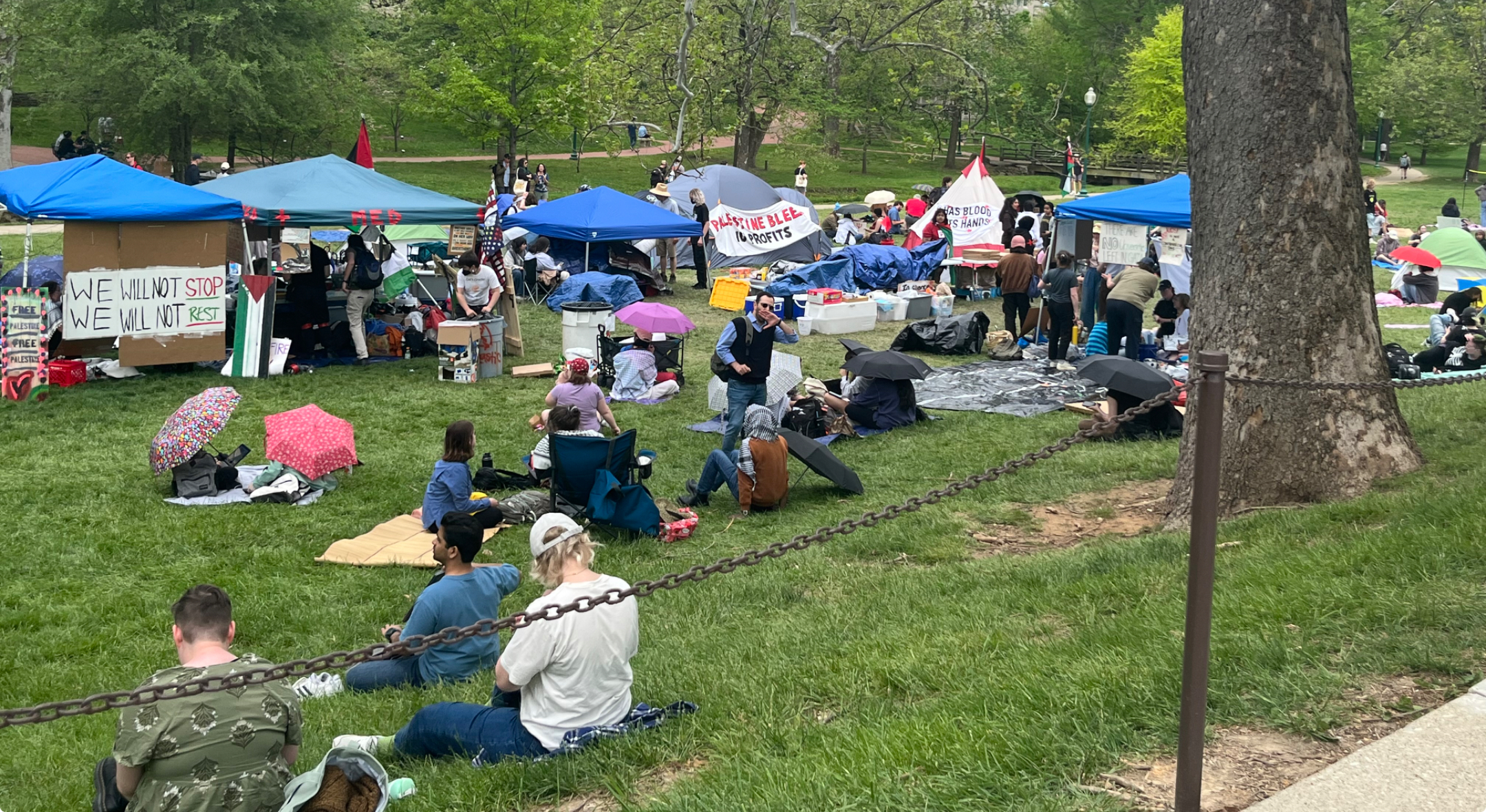
An encampment at Indiana University Bloomington on April 29

On April 19 demonstrators at Indiana University–Purdue University Indianapolis marched on Monument Circle in response to the government's response to the war. On April 26, protesters set up an encampment.

On April 25, US Senator Todd Young was being interviewed by Purdue University president Mung Chiang on campus when the event was interrupted by demonstrators. Organizers with SJP and Young Democratic Socialists of America quickly set up an encampment. The chief of the Purdue Police claimed the students were not allowed to have tents, but later, a university spokesman claimed that students were allowed to have tents.

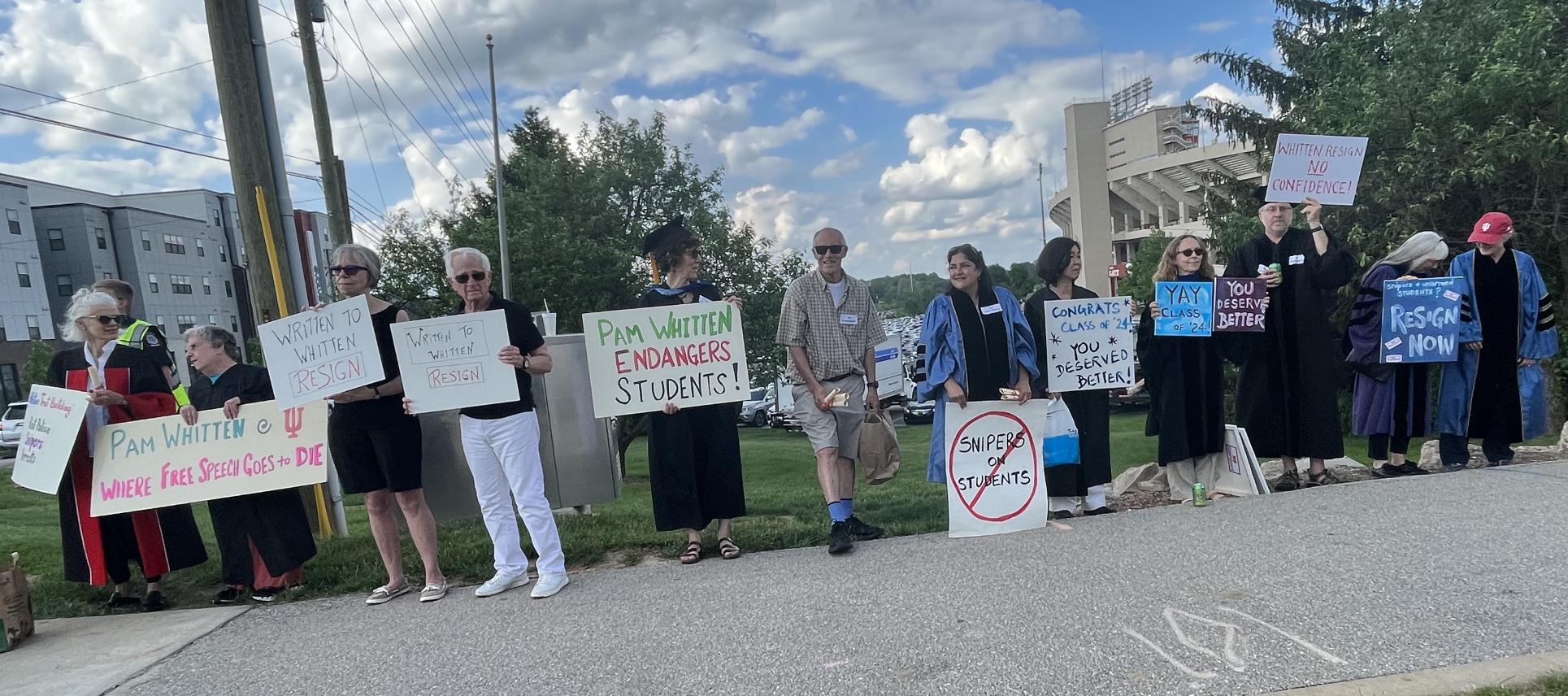
Protestors at Indiana University Bloomington near Memorial Stadium on May 4

At Indiana University, police arrested 33 protesters after an encampment was set up on the Dunn Meadow lawn. The "IU Divestment Coalition" made demands including the resignation of the President of the university, the Provost and the Vice-Provost, the end of the institution's collaboration with Naval Surface Warfare Center Crane Division, a naval installation close to Bloomington, and the cutting of financial ties with Israel. The latter would be in violation of a state law blacklisting companies that adhere to Boycott, Divestment and Sanctions (BDS). On April 25, 26, and 27, an Indiana State Police sniper was posted on the roof of the Indiana Memorial Union, overlooking the encampment on Dunn Meadow, pictures of which circulated on social media. 23 further students and faculty were arrested on April 27, including one of the organizers, who was banned from campus for five years.

On April 26, students at the University of Notre Dame held a rally calling for divestment from weapons manufactures. Police arrested 17 people during an encampment at Notre Dame on May 2.

A protest was held at the University of Southern Indiana on April 30. Another protest was held at Ball State University on May 1.

== Iowa ==
On April 30, a protest was held at Luther College. A protest was held at Iowa State University on May 1.

A planned three-day protest began at the University of Iowa on May 3. Protest organizers stated they did not plan to set up an encampment. Three days later, an encampment was formed, which police tore down later in the day.

== Kansas ==
Around forty people protested outside of the Wichita State University student center on April 26, calling for a ceasefire in Gaza.

An encampment was set up outside Fraser Hall at the University of Kansas on May 1. The same day, a protest was held at Kansas State University. On May 8, police disbanded the encampment. One protester, who was not a student, was arrested for refusing to leave their tent.

== Kentucky ==
The evening of May 1, protesters held a demonstration in front of the University of Kentucky library in Lexington.

A protest march was held at the University of Louisville on May 15.

== Louisiana ==
A walkout organised by Tulane and Loyola University's Students for a Democratic Societies took place, blocking off St. Charles Avenue. Students demanded that both Universities divest from companies profiting from Israel's war. The following Monday the organisations held a city-wide rally on Freret Street, which led to an encampment being set up in front of Tulane University's Gibson Hall. Campus Police, NOPD and State Troopers arrested a total of 18 students and community members. Other protesters were injured due to use of rubber bullets, tear gas, etc. The university suspended involved students as well as the organization.

A pro-Palestinian protest was also held outside of the Louisiana State University student union. The following day, 10 people were arrested at a protest involving Loyola and Tulane University students where, according to the New Orleans Police Department, four officers were injured while clearing Jackson Square of protesters.

A walk-out was held at Tulane and Loyola on October 7, 2024. A protest was also held at the University of New Orleans.

== Maine ==
About 30 people attended a rally organized by "Maine Students for Palestine" at the University of Southern Maine in Portland. On April 28, a protest was held at the University of Maine. The day after, a protest was held at the University of Maine at Farmington. On April 30, about 75 students established an encampment at College of the Atlantic in Bar Harbor. On May 4, a silent demonstration was held at Bates College, the same day the college's new president was inaugurated. Another protest was held at Bates on May 12, marching from campus to Representative Jared Golden's home. On May 6, a vigil was held at Colby College.

On February 6, 2025, about 50 students with the SJP chapter at Bowdoin College occupied the Smith Union building to call for administrators to adopt a BDS policy. It was the first such encampment during the second Trump administration. On February 7, students broke past security that had been posted at the doors to join the demonstration. Students received disciplinary notices but remained in the encampment by midday on Friday.

== Maryland ==
A sit-in organized by SJP took place at University of Maryland in College Park on April 23. The group planted Palestinian flags in Hornbake Plaza. Also on April 23, a protest was held at Towson University.

An encampment was set up at Goucher College.

Students rallied and marched through campus at Johns Hopkins University on April 24. Over 100 demonstrators held a rally on April 29 organized by the "Hopkins Justice Collective", subsequently setting up an encampment on campus. The following day, Johns Hopkins announced that an agreement had been reached with the protesters to only protest from 10am-8pm, and dismantle the encampment. Initial reports stated that the encampment had dispersed, however protesters put out a statement saying they had merely "regrouped and re-strategized", and the encampment remained, with protesters saying no agreement was reached. Johns Hopkins set a deadline of 6pm May 8 for students to sign a form and voluntarily leave the encampment and not take any further disruptive action, in exchange for no disciplinary action being taken against them, with those who remained being subject to disciplinary action. The encampment did not disperse, despite this deadline.

On May 17, a group of graduates at the University of Maryland Baltimore protested keynote speaker Senator Ben Cardin for his stance on Israel.

== Massachusetts ==
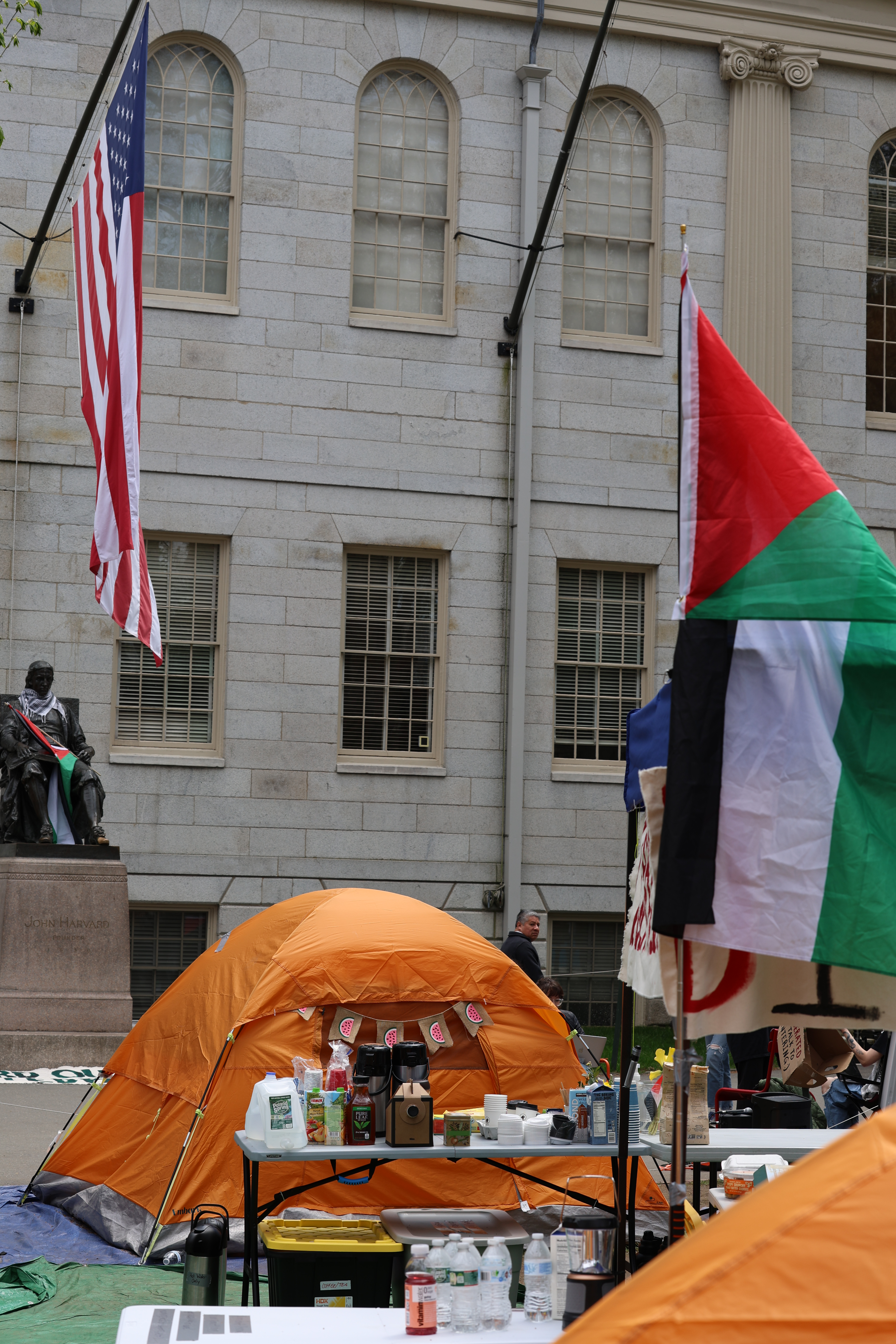
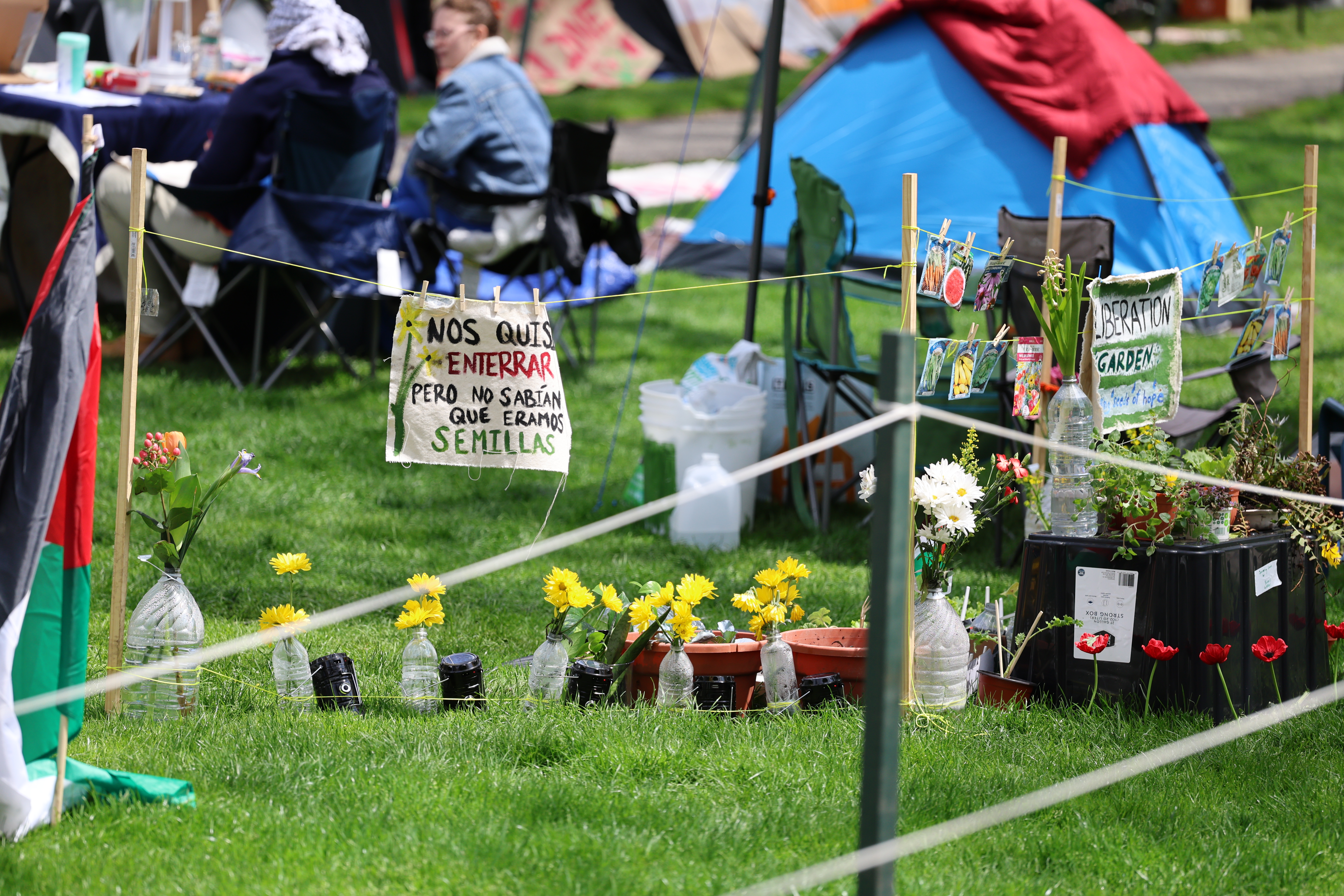
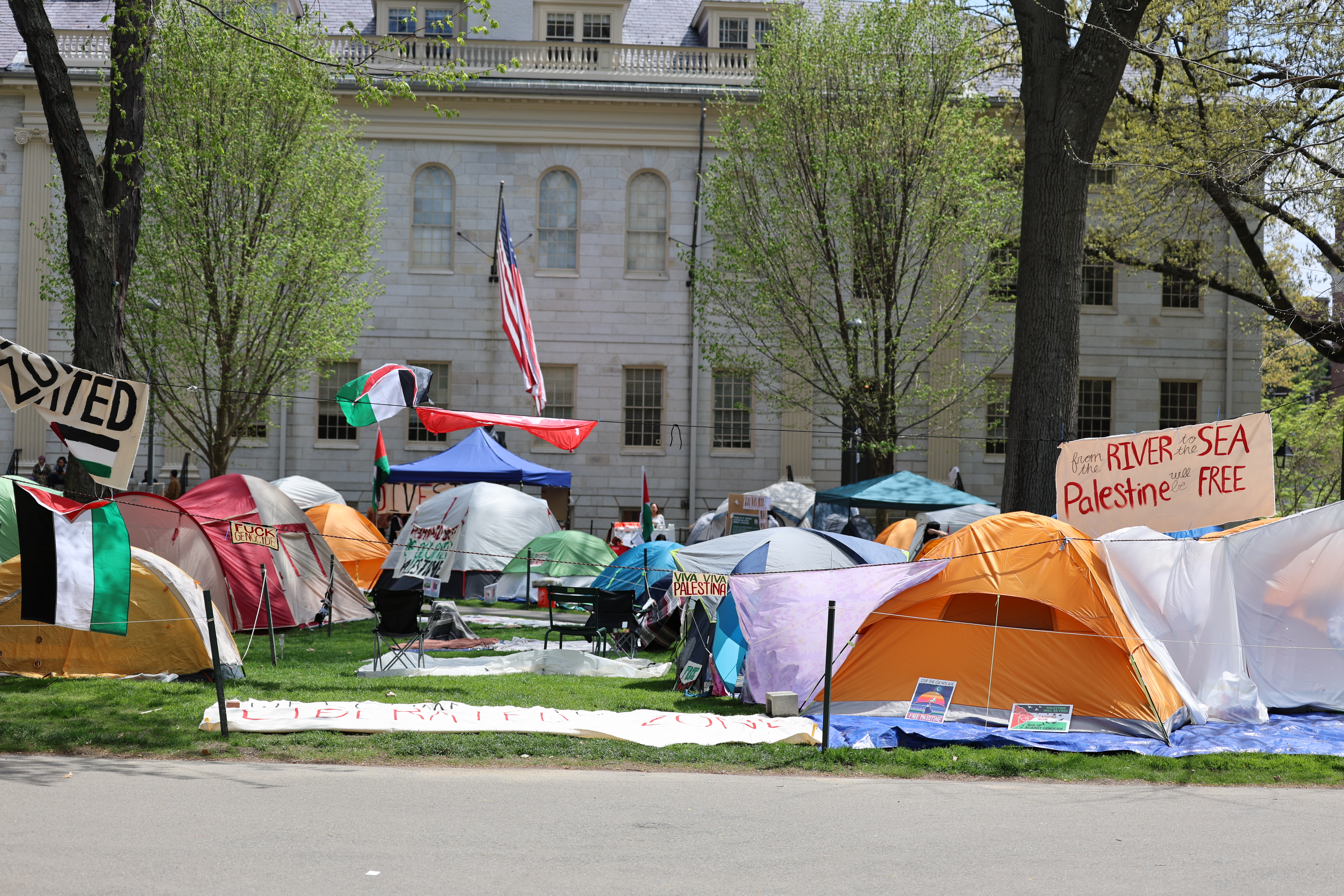
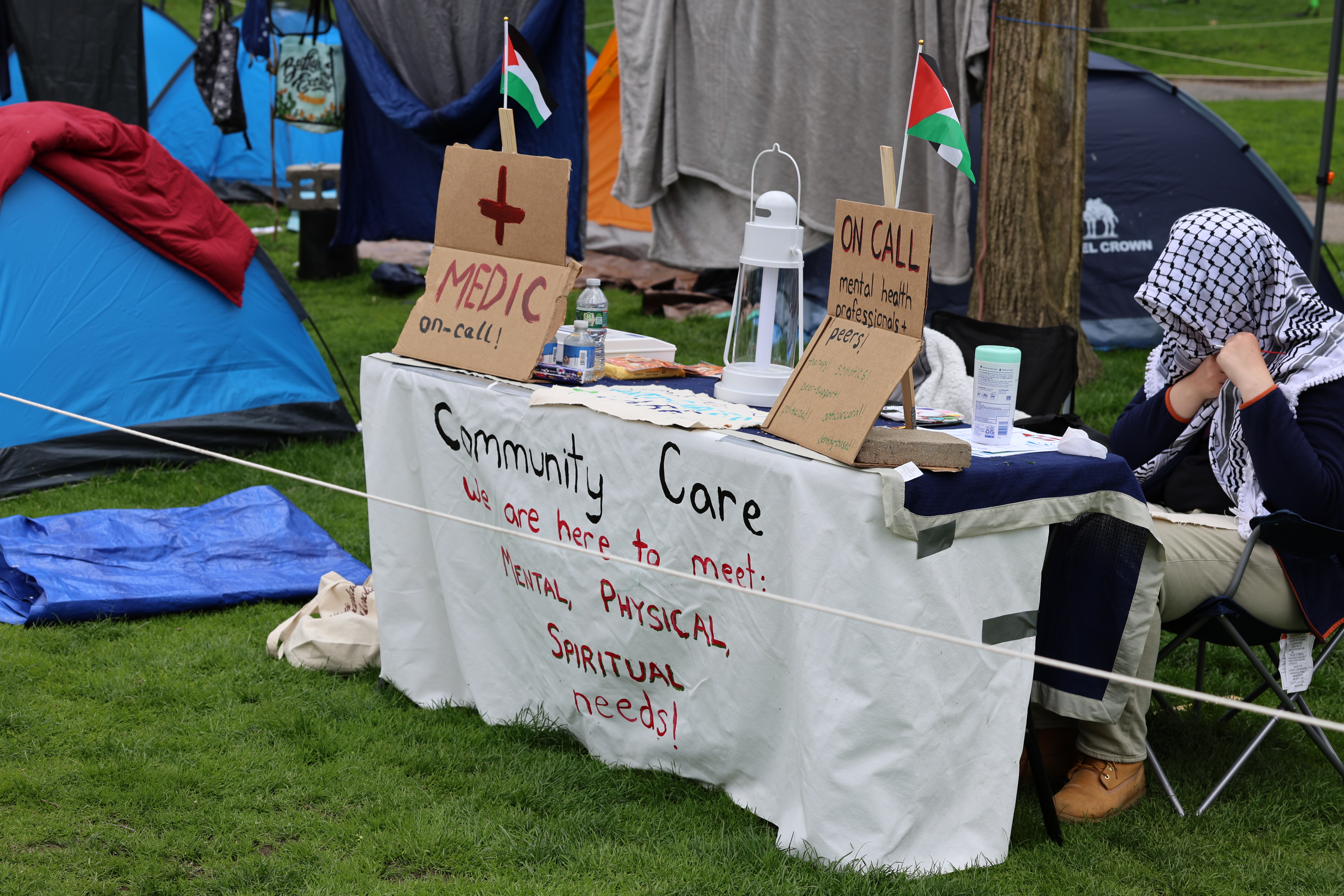
Encampment at Harvard University on May 2, 2024
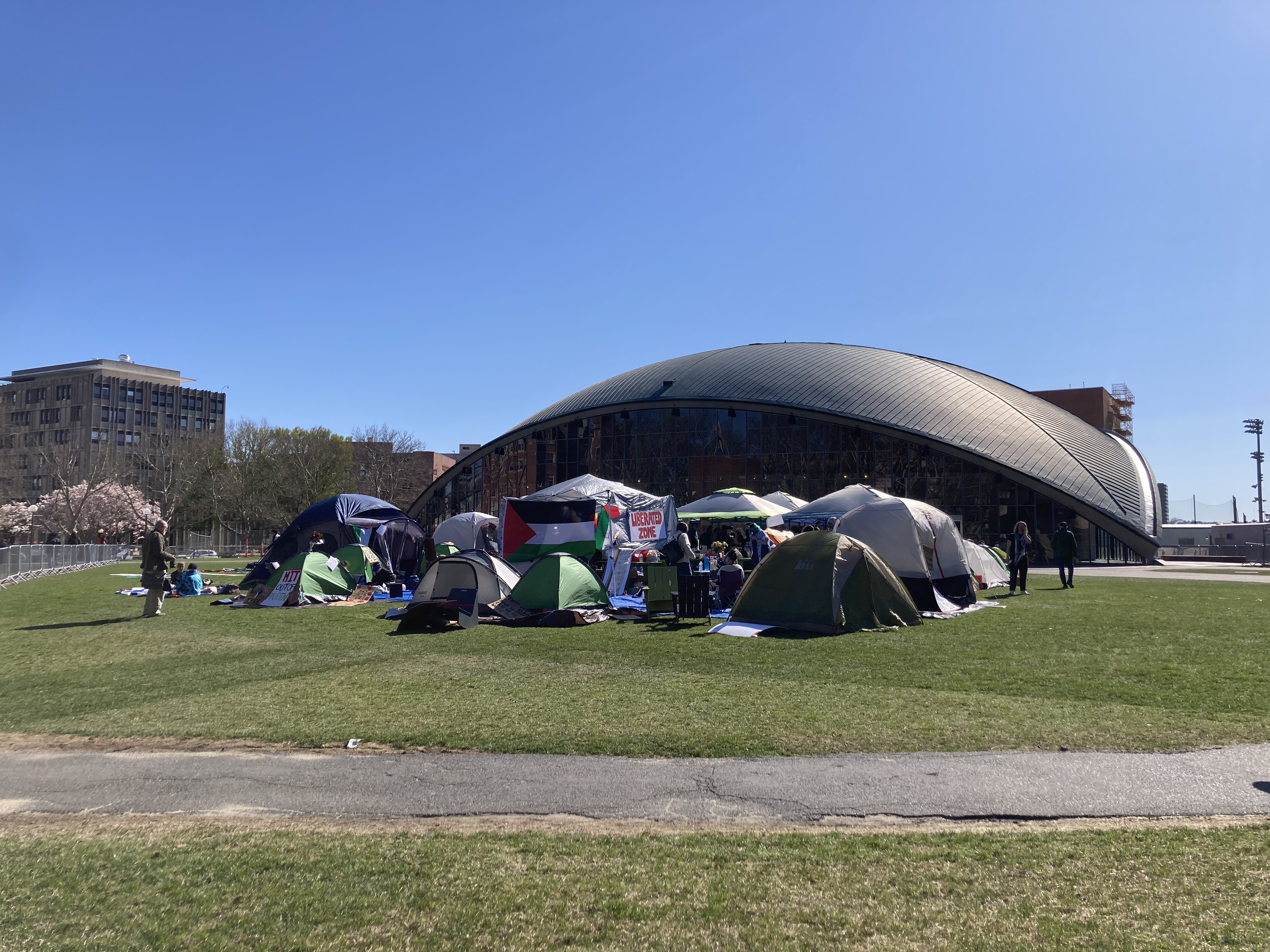
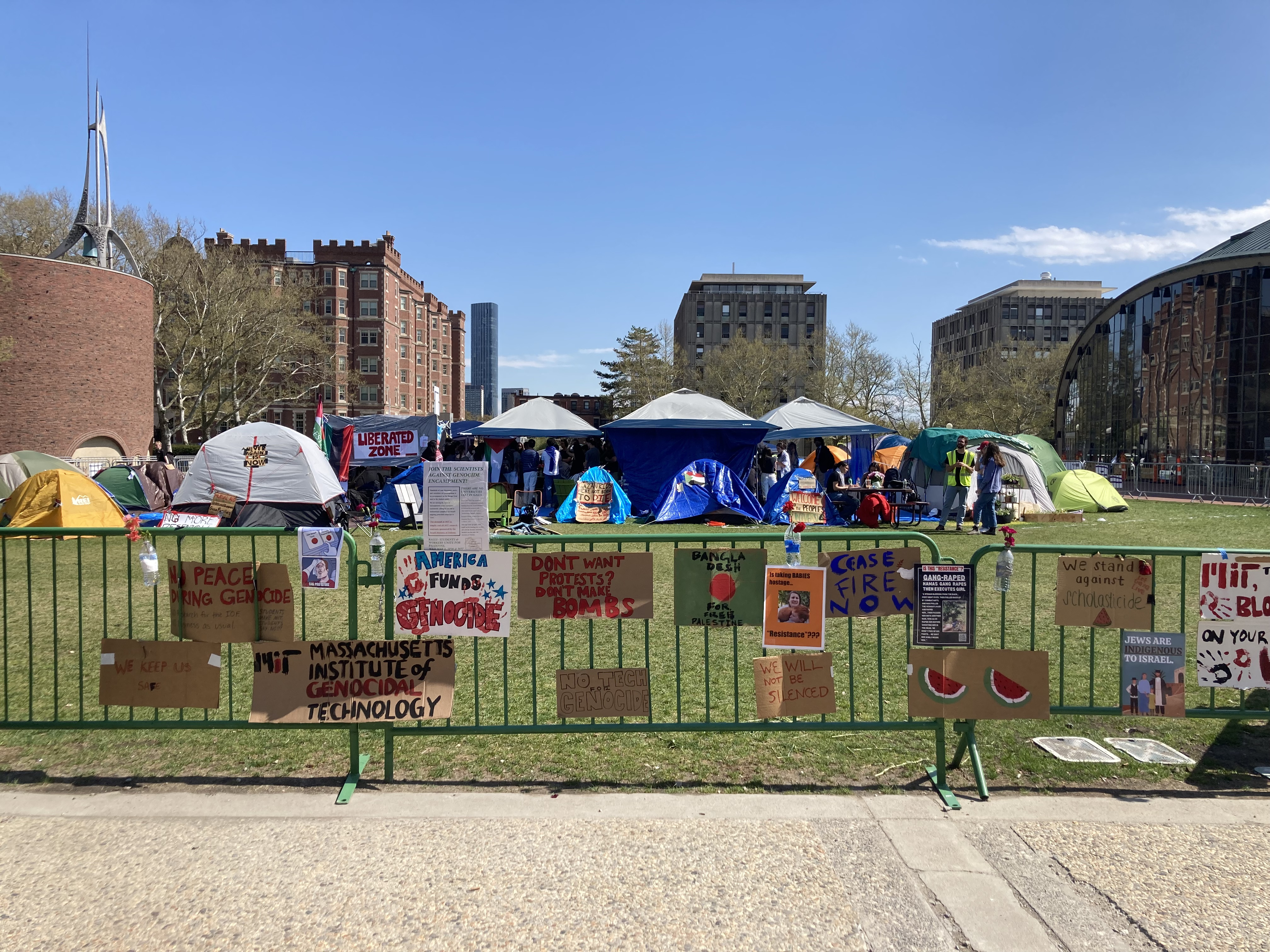
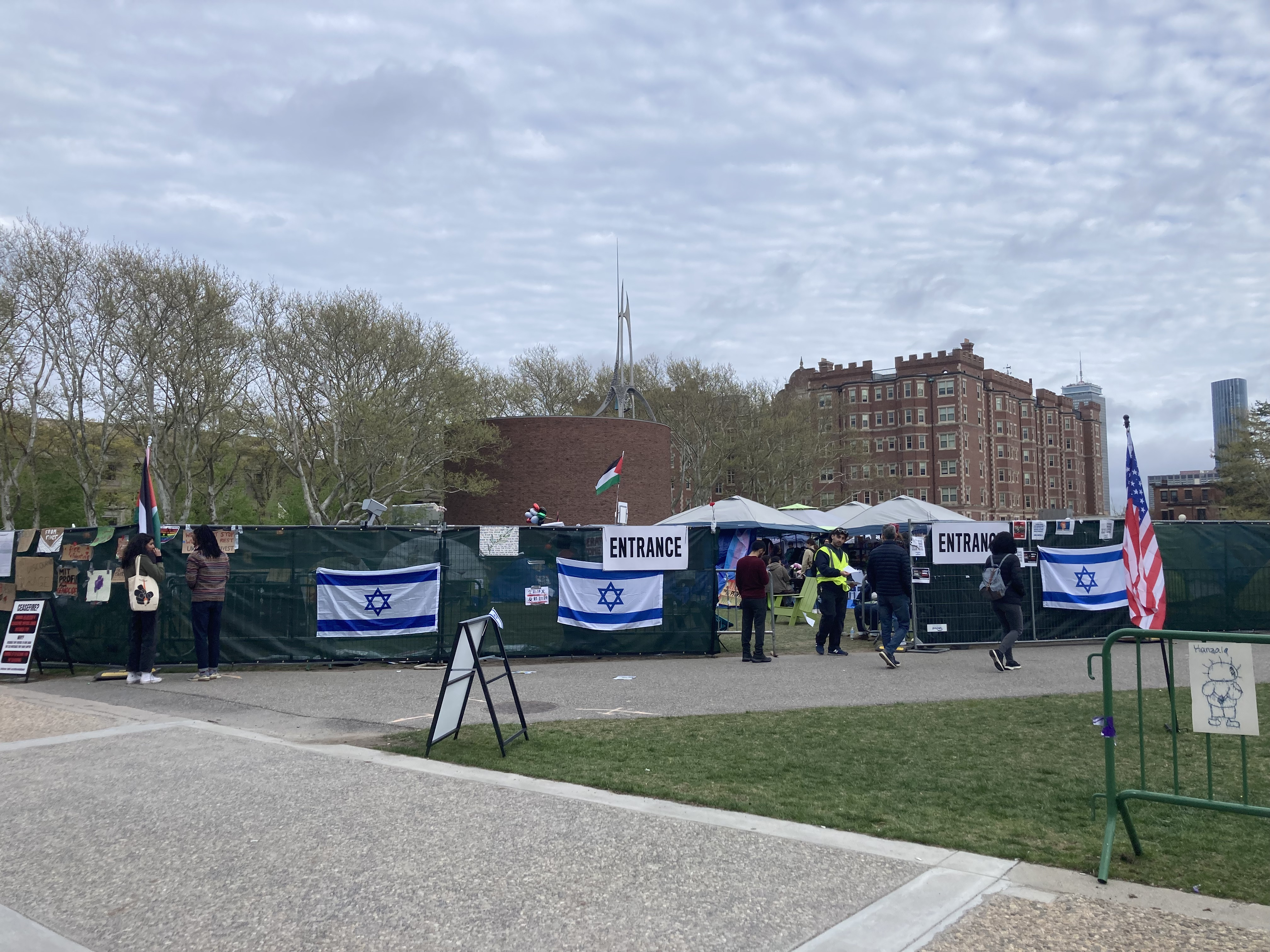
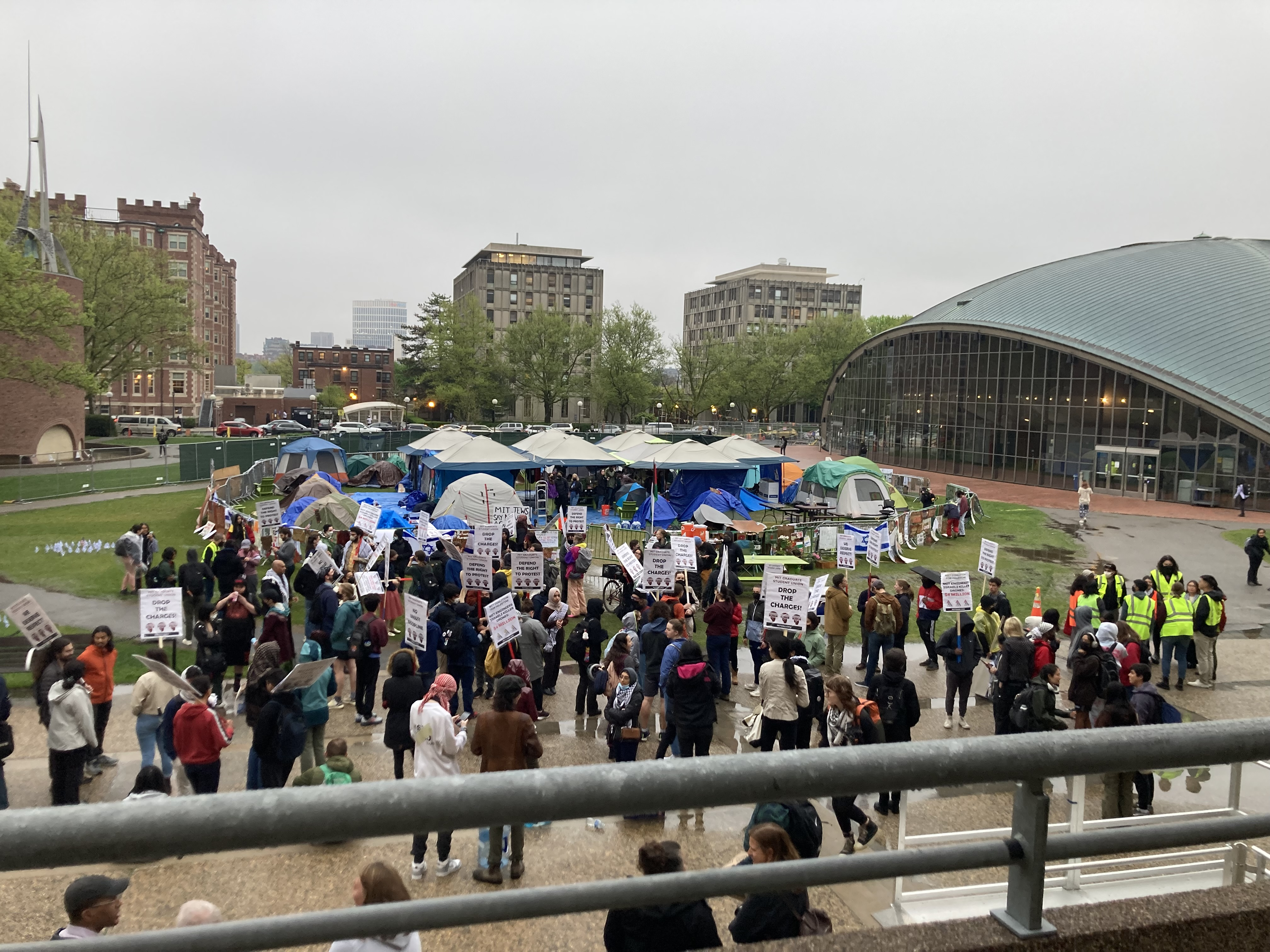
Encampment at Massachusetts Institute of Technology on April 23, May 2, May 4, and May 8, 2024

On April 19, students at Boston University protested in solidarity with Columbia students. Two days later a pro-Palestinian protest was held at Smith College.

On April 24, 2024, students set up an encampment at Harvard University on Harvard Yard. The encampment was organized by Harvard Out of Occupied Palestine, a coalition of several pro-Palestine groups, which demand that Harvard discloses and divests from investments in Israel. The protests resulted in changes for final exam locations. During the protests, students ...have flipped maqluba, hosted prayers, danced Dabke, and eaten Shabbat dinner, and the protesters, joined by some faculty members, have emphasized a peaceful character of the demonstration, which was also confirmed by Harvard police chief. During the encampment, access to Harvard Yard has been restricted to Harvard ID holders. Harvard University considered the demonstration a 'direct violation' of its policy.

Students at the Massachusetts Institute of Technology launched the "Scientists Against Genocide" encampment on the evening of April 21, 2024; protestors demanded that MIT cut research ties with the IDF. A solidarity encampment with at least a dozen tents also appeared at Tufts University.

On the evening of April 21, 2024, students at Emerson College set up an encampment in the Boylston Place alleyway in solidarity with those arrested in similar protests. The students called for Emerson to divest from any associations with Zionist ties. During the night of April 24, about 108 people were arrested at the protest with video showing officers forcefully moving through the crowd and throwing protestors on the ground, who had linked arms and used umbrellas to resist. Four officers were reportedly injured with non-life-threatening injuries. School administrators stated that the protestors had been warned to leave beforehand as the alleyway was not solely owned by the school and that city authorities had threatened to become involved. Boston Mayor Michelle Wu said she ordered police to take down the Emerson encampment for public safety reasons.

On April 25, students at Boston's Northeastern University circled their encampment on the school's Centennial Commons and chanted as police approached. Police left the scene shortly afterward. Students from Berklee College of Music joined the Northeastern encampment.

On April 27, more than 100 pro-Palestinian protesters were arrested at the university. School officials alleged the student demonstration was infiltrated by outsiders who yelled antisemitic slurs such as "Kill the Jews." A video circulating on social media later showed a counter-protestor holding an Israeli flag had attempted to provoke a response by yelling "kill the Jews."

A protest was held at Boston College on April 26. During the protest, an organizer read a letter written by a BC student who had been arrested at Emerson and banned from the BC campus.

Demonstrators at the University of Massachusetts Amherst protested the inauguration of UMass Amherst Chancellor Javier Reyes, calling on him to cut ties with military groups and drop charges against people who had been charged during previous protests at UMass Amherst. Three days later, an encampment was built on campus. The encampment was dismantled the following day. Another encampment was set up on May 7, and police arrested 109 people at the site.

A walk-out and protest was held at Simmons University on May 1. An encampment was set up at Williams College the same day, and a protest was held at the nearby Massachusetts College of Liberal Arts. On May 3, a pro-Palestinian rally was held at Worcester State University.

On the morning of May 3, M.I.T. administrators ordered the Scientists Against Genocide encampment to be surrounded with six-foot-tall felt-covered barricades in anticipation of a counterprotest scheduled for that afternoon. On the morning of May 6, M.I.T. administrators and police set up an ID checkpoint at the entrance of the Scientists Against Genocide encampment; access was restricted to MIT affiliates, who had to tap their MIT ID to enter the encampment. Around 1:00 P.M. on the same day, administrators issued letters to students inside the encampment, instructing them to either leave the encampment by 2:30 P.M. or risk suspension. After the 2:30 P.M. deadline, five students and three faculty members remained inside the encampment; a rally of hundreds gathered on the steps of the Stratton Student Center throughout the afternoon in support of the demonstrators.

Around 4:00 P.M., another group of students attempted to blockade the entrance to Infinite Corridor in Lobby 7 with a tent; banners were dropped from the upper levels of Lobby 7, detailing MIT's research ties with the IDF in a receipt-like format. The students were forced out of Lobby 7 by police and instead blocked the middle outer entrance to Lobby 7, facing Massachusetts Avenue, with a sit-in.

During the same afternoon, pro-Palestine students from as many as a dozen Boston and Cambridge area high walked out in solidarity with the M.I.T encampments, meeting at Boston Common and marching to M.I.T. Their arrival coincided with the appearance of the Lobby 7 sit-in. The high schoolers blocked traffic on Massachusetts Avenue and held a rally.

Around 5:30 P.M, several students scaled the fence surrounding the encampment; soon afterwards, demonstrators from the Student Center rally knocked down the barricades surrounding the encampment, and about 150 students locked arms around the camp. M.I.T., Cambridge, and state police were present at the scene, but did not make any arrests.

On May 8, M.I.T issued interim suspensions to dozens of pro-Palestinian organizers.

On the afternoon of May 9, M.I.T. demonstrators picketed the parking garage at Stata Center; five graduate students and four undergraduate students were arrested by Cambridge Police.

At 4:00 A.M. on May 10, police in riot gear arrived at Kresge Lawn and gave protestors fifteen minutes to vacate the encampment. Ten students were arrested, and police dismantled the encampment by 7:00 A.M.

On May 14, protesters at Harvard reached an agreement to end encampment on campus. The university agreed to reinstate 20 suspended students, leniency for 60 others, to begin discussions about divestment with members of Harvard Out of Occupied Palestine (HOOP), and to have conversations about creating a “Center for Palestine Studies at Harvard.”

On May 15, United Auto Workers (U.A.W.)'s Harvard Graduate Student Union filed a lawsuit against Harvard University, accusing it of surveillance and retaliation against workplace-related collective action, denying employees union representation in disciplinary hearings and unfairly changing policies regarding access to campus to discourage protesters.

On May 23, more than a thousand people walked out of Harvard's commencement ceremony in protest of the university's decision to deny diplomas to 13 pro-Palestine protesters who were involved in the encampment. Two speakers changed their prepared remarks to show support to the protesters.

On June 1, protesters at Amherst College disrupted an event at the college's Alumni Weekend.

A protest was held at the University of Massachusetts Boston on September 17.

== Michigan ==
On April 22, students set up tents on The Diag, in front of the Hatcher Graduate Library at the University of Michigan in Ann Arbor. Counter protests handed out small Israeli flags near the encampment to show support for Israel.

On April 25, students at Michigan State University in East Lansing set up a solidarity encampment in the same "People's Park" area that hosted an anti-Vietnam War encampment in 1970.

On April 26, a group of protesters interrupted a meeting of the Board of Governors at Wayne State University. One person was arrested.

On April 28 protesters established an encampment at Western Michigan University in Kalamazoo. The day after, an encampment was set up at Northern Michigan University. A protest had previously been held at NMU on April 22.

On May 21, police used pepper spray to clear the encampment at University of Michigan. University president Santa Ono claimed that fire hazards were the reasons. Four were arrested. The day after, dozens of activists gathered outside the Washtenaw County Courthouse demanding that charges be dropped against the four who were arrested.

On May 23, an encampment was set up at Wayne State University. On May 30, police dismantled the encampment and arrested 12 people.

On August 28, a coalition of more than 90 pro-Palestinian organizations held a die-in at a back to school festival held at the University of Michigan. Four protesters were arrested. On August 29, after one of the four was not released right away, the group began a protest in front of the campus police headquarters demanding his release.

== Minnesota ==
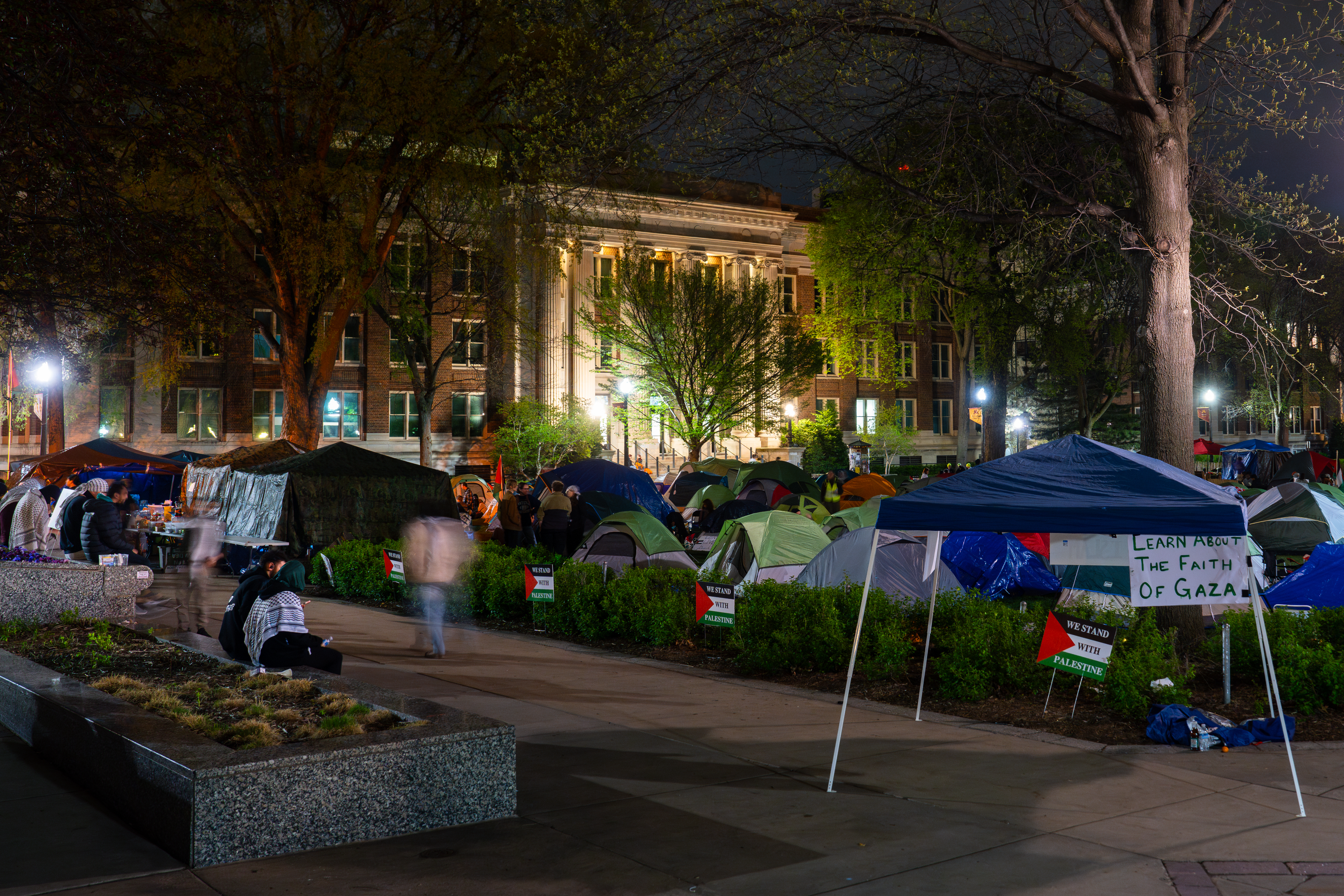
Encampement at the University of Minnesota, May 1, 2024

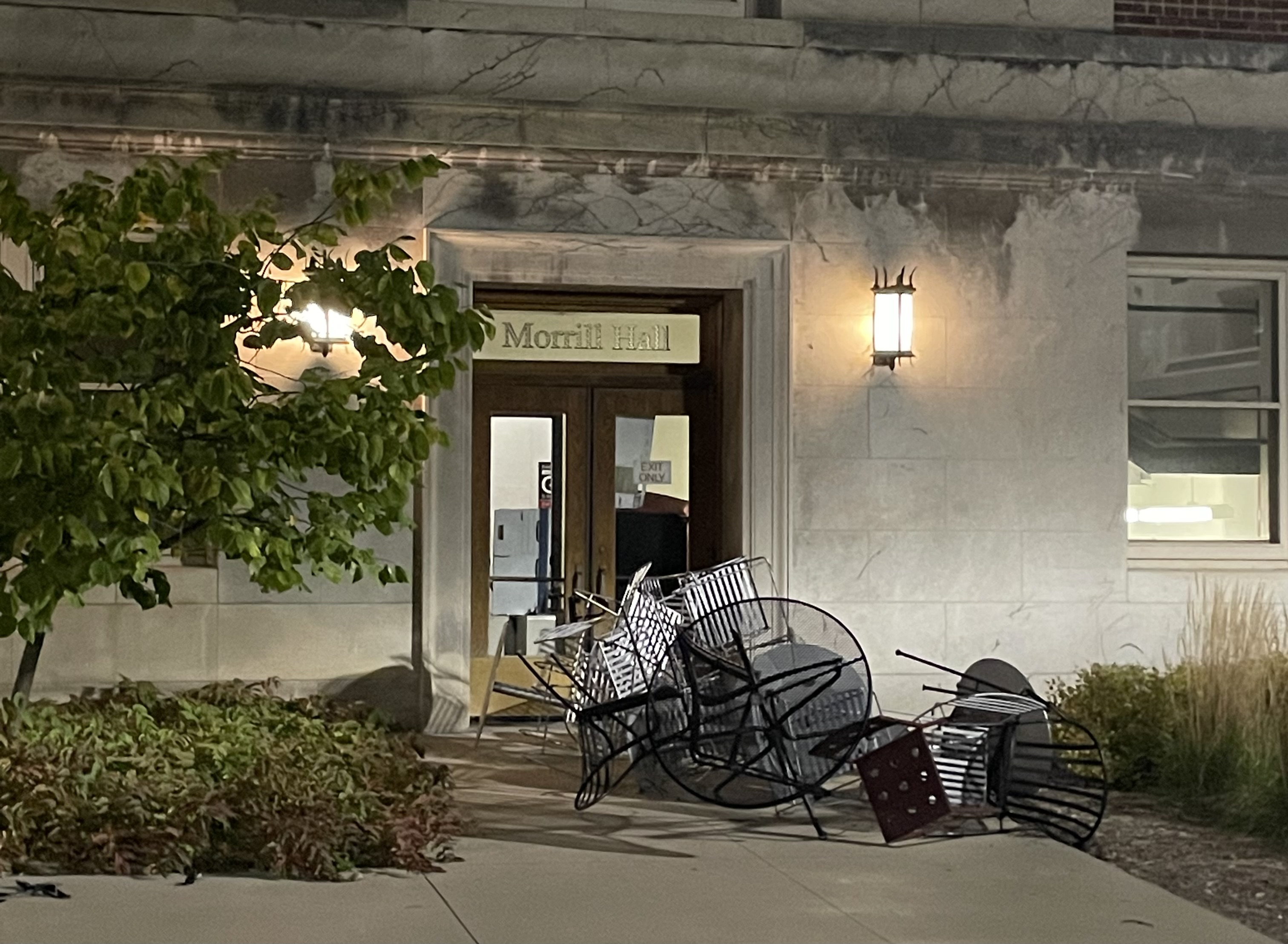
A barricaded entrance to Morrill Hall, October 21, 2024

Nine University of Minnesota students were arrested on April 23 while attempting to set up an encampment on the Minneapolis campus. US Representative Ilhan Omar joined protestors. Protests resumed the following day. On May 1, protesters dismantled their own encampment after the U of M agreed to consider their demands.

On April 26, a group of student protesters at Hamline University held a sit-in protest at the university president's office building. After 29 hours the protesters moved to an encampment on the lawn in front of the building.

A protest was held at Concordia College in Moorhead on April 30.

On May 2, an encampment was set up at Minnesota State University, Mankato.

Protesters at Carleton College set up an encampment. The encampment was scheduled to coincide with when the Board of Trustees would visit campus, from May 8 to 10. On May 17, students held an overnight occupation of Laird Hall, the location of the president's office, resulting in twelve students receiving disciplinary action.

On October 21, protesters organized by the University of Minnesota's SDS chapter occupied Morrill Hall at the University of Minnesota, barricading themselves inside. Property damage was reported and several protesters were arrested. An SDS representative claimed that the building was chosen due to its prior history, having been occupied by black students in 1969 as part of the civil rights movement.

== Mississippi ==
Dozens of students held a pro-Palestinian protest at the University of Mississippi, but were escorted into a building by police after counter-protesters intimidated the pro-Palestinian protesters into ending the event early. One counter-protester was filmed making monkey noises towards a Black protester, causing backlash. The White House called it racist and undignified.

A protest was held at the University of Southern Mississippi on May 7. Around 50 protesters were present, and there were no counter-protesters.

== Missouri ==
About 50 protesters from the university and the community gathered at Washington University in St. Louis, Missouri. An alumnus of the school who is a current student at Columbia University spoke at the event. Police from Richmond Heights, St. Louis County, St. Louis Metro, and Washington University were called to disburse the small crowd. On April 27, more than 80 protesters were arrested, including Green Party U.S. presidential candidate Jill Stein and her campaign managers, according to the campaign's communications director. During the arrests, police broke the ribs of history professor Steve Tamari.

On April 29, students held a protest march at the University of Missouri, while students at University of Missouri–Kansas City set up an encampment.

On May 1, a protest was held at Saint Louis University.

On May 3, protesters held a sit-in at the Missouri State University student union. The same day, a protest was held at Southeast Missouri State University.

== Nevada ==
A pro-Palestinian protest was held at the University of Nevada, Reno on April 26.

On May 1, a protest was held at the University of Nevada, Las Vegas.

== New Hampshire ==
Around 200 people demonstrated at Dartmouth College's campus on April 25. Another protest was held at the University of New Hampshire on the same day, where demonstrators called for UNH to divest from companies based in Israel. Additional protests were held at both universities on May 1, with police arresting protesters at both locations as they attempted to set up encampments. Police in riot gear arrested 90 people at Dartmouth. Among the arrested included history professor Annelise Orleck, who described the police actions as "brutal" and "punitive", after she was tackled and knelt on by police.

A protest was held at Keene State College on April 29.

== New Jersey ==
On April 22, faculty and staff at Princeton issued a pledge to withhold labor from Columbia University until it meets their demands to reinstate students who were wrongly suspended for protesting, remove the NYPD from Columbia campus and reverse the suspension of two pro-Palestinian student groups. On April 24, plans for a "Princeton Gaza Solidarity Encampment" were intercepted by the conservative leaning National Review. On April 25, about 100 students started an encampment in McCosh Courtyard, declaring "We're gonna be here until the University divests." Two people were arrested before 10 am.

Demonstrations took place in Princeton University and Rutgers University on April 29, with an encampment being built on the College Avenue Campus in New Brunswick. Two days later, protesters at Rutgers' Newark campus set up an encampment in front of Rutgers Law School. On May 2, the encampment on College Avenue was given a deadline by the university to leave or face action by law enforcement. Shortly after the deadline, protesters dismantled the encampment after reaching an agreement with administrators.

A protest was held at the Stevens Institute of Technology on November 11.

== New Mexico ==
On April 24, a solidarity encampment set up near the duck pond at University of New Mexico in Albuquerque. Protesters demanded that the university divest from Israel and arms manufacturers that are known to use research from UNM faculty and students. Police detained 16 people at the student union on the night of April 29. On May 14, UNM gave protesters an ultimatum to leave the encampment. The twenty-four day old encampment was still in place more than twelve hours after the deadline. About 50 people were given formal notice to vacate by police. On May 15, dozens of protesters were arrested for criminal trespass and wrongful use of property. On May 16, the UNM Board of Regent's took public comment at a chaotic scheduled meeting.

An encampment was set up at New Mexico State University in Las Cruces on April 29. On April 6, the protesters voluntarily dismantled their encampment after the university president stated that they could not locate any investments in Israel. On May 9, protesters organized a sit-in at Hadley Hall at NMSU. Police arrested 13 people on charges ranging from misdemeanor trespassing, vandalism and assaulting a peace officer.

== New York ==
People's University for Palestine at Cornell University
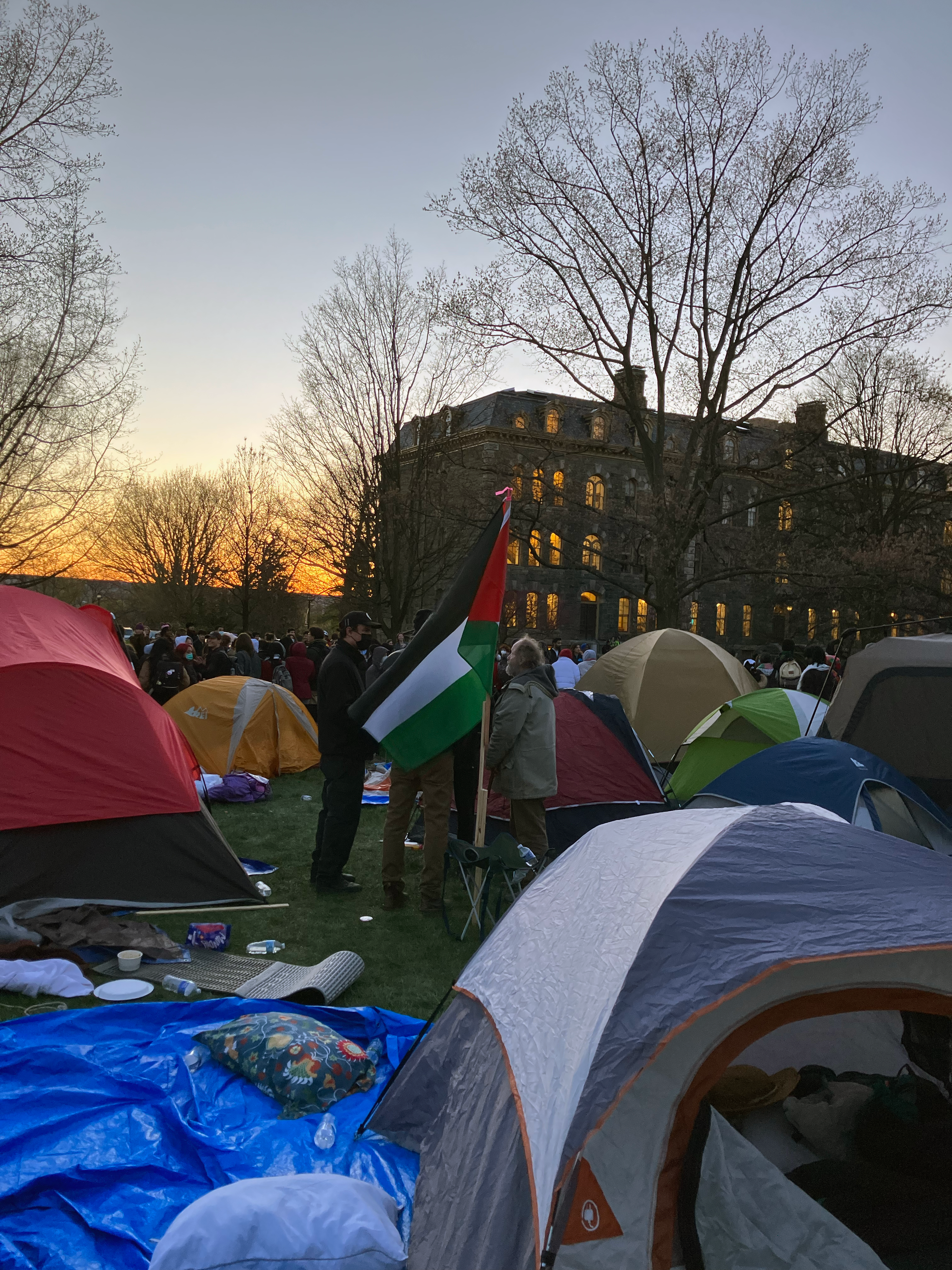
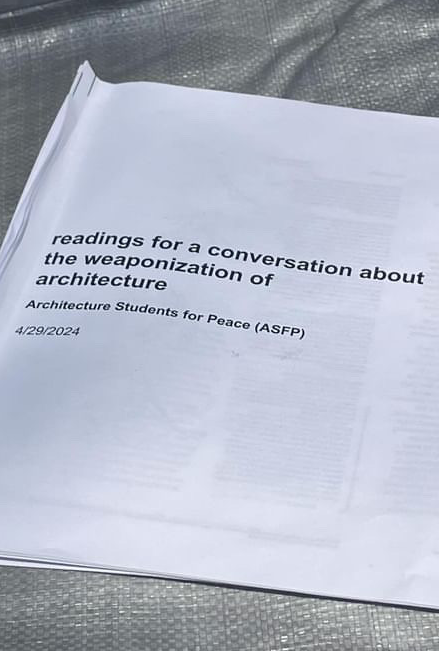
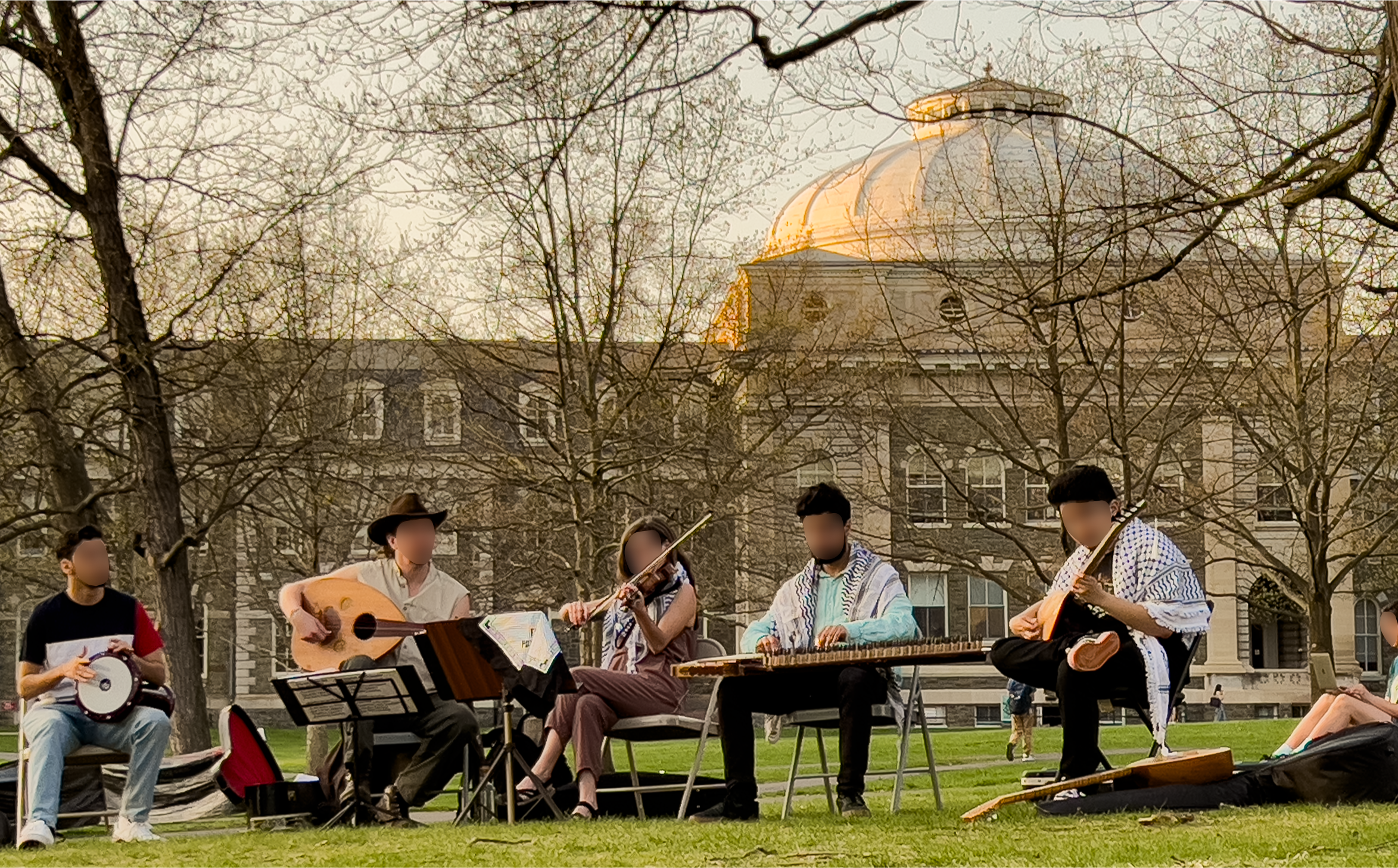
From top clockwise: A mural in solidarity with Gaza. The encampment on April 25, 2024. Group of Students performing Palestinian music. Diagram displaying the "People's University for Palestine" encampment as of May 1, 2024. Example of reading material handed out during "Teach-In" sessions.

Students at Barnard College joined the encampment at Columbia University. 53 students were arrested and suspended, but the college reversed "nearly all" the suspensions.

Police took down tents outside the Stern School of Business at New York University on April 22. 133 protesters were arrested. Helga Tawil-Souri, a professor at NYU, said, "They brought in the police—hundreds of policemen in riot gear". Solidarity sit-ins were also held at NYU's campuses in Berlin, Germany, and Buenos Aires, Argentina.

Authorities at NYU have alleged that some participants in the protests had no link to the university, and Columbia's president alleged that people not affiliated with the university had joined the protests, exploiting and increasing tensions on campus.

On April 22, 2024, Cornell University undergraduates supported, by a 2–1 margin, a referendum calling for a permanent ceasefire and divestment from weapons manufacturers supporting Israel. On April 25, 2024, Cornell students erected an encampment, calling on the university to divest from companies involved with the "ongoing genocide" in Gaza. Cornell University suspended four student protesters on April 27, 2024. Three days later, Cornell administrators threatened students with a second wave of suspensions. Two additional students were suspended by Cornell. One of the suspended students stated, "We've had death threats. We've had – while we were praying Salat al-Jum'ah – we've had police videoing and take pictures of us". One Cornell student was sentenced to 21 months in federal prison for posting threats to shoot and stab Jewish people" online, which his lawyer claimed were meant to produce sympathy for Israelis.

A group called "The New School's Students for Justice in Palestine" established a solidarity encampment inside the University Center building on April 21. On April 25, a student-built encampment was established at the West Harlem campus of the City College of New York (CCNY). The encampment was joined by a number of Hasidic Jews. The same day, students at the Fashion Institute of Technology occupied the school's Shirley Goodman Resource Center building.

More than a dozen tents were spotted at a solidarity encampment at University of Rochester's River Campus on April 23. On April 24, the university's faculty senate stated its intention to investigate its ties to Israel. An encampment was set up at Syracuse University on April 29.

On April 20, a die-in protest was held at Ithaca College. On April 25, peaceful protests were held at Hofstra University, St. John's University, and SUNY Brockport. A peaceful protest was held on April 29 at Adelphi University.

Beginning on April 28, an encampment was established at Vassar College in Poughkeepsie. Two days later, students at Stony Brook University formed an encampment on the Staller Steps.

A protest was held at Fordham University's Lincoln Center campus on April 25. Five days later on May 1 an encampment was set up, which was cleared by the NYPD later in the day. A protest was also held at Fordham's Rose Hill campus.

On April 30, nearly 300 students were arrested at Columbia and CCNY. One day prior, members of the Professional Staff Congress voted to strike on May Day in support of the CUNY students' demands, an action considered significant due to the prohibition of strikes by public sector workers under the Taylor Law.

An encampment was set up at Binghamton University on May 1. Police at the University at Buffalo arrested several people as they tried to set up an encampment. Earlier in the day a peaceful protest was held at nearby Buffalo State University.

On May 1, an encampment was set up at SUNY New Paltz. On May 2, police arrested 133 people and dismantled the encampment.

An encampment was set up at SUNY Purchase on May 2. Police arrested 70 people the following morning. Also on May 2, a sit-in was held at the School of Visual Arts in Manhattan.

On May 3, in the early morning, police cleared two encampments, arresting 13 protesters at NYU and 43 at the New School. Around noon, hundreds more protested the clearings near the Elmer Holmes Bobst Library at NYU. Witnesses who alleged the police did not give those arrested their Miranda warnings spoke at this rally.

On May 6, the day of the annual Met Gala funtraising event, protesters gathered at nearby Hunter College. They then marched from Hunter College to the Metropolitan Museum of Art, where the event was being held. 27 people were arrested, mostly for disorderly conduct. Protests were also held at Bard College and Baruch College the same day.

On May 9, a protest was held by students and faculty at the Cooper Union. Another protest was held at Baruch on the same day.

On May 14, protesters began occupying a building at the CUNY Graduate Center.

On May 17, protesters at Bard College began occupying a building on campus. They dubbed the building "Shaima's Hall", in honor of Shaima Refaat Alareer, daughter of poet Refaat Alareer.

On May 23, several protesters walked out of the College of Staten Island graduation ceremony in support of Gaza. A group of protesters got into an argument with a CUNY public safety officer, during which the officer told the protesters "I support genocide" and "I support killing all you guys, how about that?". A College of Staten Island spokesperson said the officer was suspended pending further review.

Eight CUNY law students filed a lawsuit against the school relating to policy changes at their commencement ceremony on May 23 alleging violation of free speech rights.

On July 23, a protest organized by Within Our Lifetime and Students for Justice in Palestine was held at Queens College. The protest was organized in response to the college being used as a film set for an episode of the TV show FBI: Most Wanted, wherein a climate protest encampment was constructed.

On August 23, NYU added a declaration to their student code of conduct that the word "Zionist" was a code word, banned student organizations from excluding Zionists from their open events and disseminating "tropes, stereotypes, and conspiracies" about Zionists. In response, the NYU chapter of Jewish on Campus declared that "Zionism is a core component of Jewish identity." The New York City chapter of Palestinian Youth Movement said that the new police "criminalizes Palestine solidarity." Also on August 23, a protest was held at the University at Albany during its convocation ceremony.

On August 26, on the first day of the fall semester, activists vandalized the administration building at Cornell, spraying graffiti and smashing the glass door. In a statement to The Cornell Daily Sun, a person claiming to represent the perpetrators said "we had to accept that the only way to make ourselves heard is by targeting the only thing the university administration truly cares about: property".

On September 19, student protesters shut down a career fair at Cornell because it was attended by representatives from defense contractors Boeing and L3Harris for aiding "war crimes and genocide" in Israel.

On November 24, protesters established a camp at Sarah Lawrence College. It ended on November 27 after the university promised to disclose ties to Israel.

On February 26, 2025, protesters held a sit-in at Barnard College to protest the expulsion of two students who had been expelled for interrupting an Israeli history class. On May 7, police dispersed an encampment at Brooklyn College and arrested multiple protesters.

=== Columbia University ===
During the Gaza war and genocide, Columbia University in New York City has been the site of student activism—including a series of protests, encampments, and occupations—in solidarity with the Palestinians of Gaza and against what student protesters have called the university's complicity in the genocide. The main demand of the Gaza solidarity protest movement at Columbia was that the university disinvest from Israel. The university's administration and the federal government have sought to repress the protests, which they have called antisemitic. In 2025, the university became a focus of President Donald Trump, whose administration, citing what it called widespread antisemitism at Columbia, cut $400 million in funding to Columbia and issued a list of demands, detained and attempted to deport Mahmoud Khalil and Mohsen Mahdawi, and investigated Columbia for Title VI violations. In a settlement with the Trump administration, the Trustees of Columbia University agreed to pay over $200 million, adopt the IHRA definition of antisemitism, and accept other demands.

That protest, jointly organized by Columbia's chapters of Students for Justice in Palestine (SJP) and Jewish Voice for Peace (JVP), demanded that Columbia address Palestinian humanity, disinvest from Israel, cancel the CU Tel Aviv Global Center, and stop the dual degree program with Tel Aviv University. Columbia's administration adjusted its protest policies and, on November 10, suspended SJP and JVP for organizing an "unauthorized" walkout. At a November 14 rally, a coalition of 80+ student groups was announced as Columbia University Apartheid Divest (CUAD), which continued to organize protest activity with six demands, including that Columbia institutionally call for an immediate ceasefire, divestment from companies profiting from Israeli apartheid, and end its vilification of pro-Palestinian activism.

On April 17, 2024, Columbia students established the Gaza Solidarity Encampment on the East Butler Lawn. The next day, Columbia President Minouche Shafik called in the New York City Police Department (NYPD) to arrest them en masse—the first time Columbia allowed police to suppress campus protests since the 1968 demonstrations against the Vietnam War. Shortly after the mass arrest and dismantling of the initial camp, other students autonomously occupied the adjacent lawn and established another encampment there, holding it for several days as students negotiated with the administration. The Columbia encampments encouraged other actions at multiple universities and led to the proliferation of Palestine solidarity encampments at over 180 universities around the world.

On April 29, after Shafik announced the end of negotiations and said Columbia "will not divest from Israel", protesters occupied Hamilton Hall, calling it Hind's Hall in honor of Hind Rajab. After less than 24 hours, the NYPD was summoned again. Hundreds of NYPD officers broke into and cleared the hall, arrested more than 100 protesters, and fully dismantled the camp. On May 31, a third campus encampment was briefly established in response to an alumni reunion.

When Shafik announced her resignation as president on August 14, 2024, Katrina Armstrong, then CEO of the Columbia University Irving Medical Center and dean of the Columbia University College of Physicians and Surgeons, became interim president. After the Trump administration's $400 million funding cut, Armstrong stepped down and Claire Shipman, then co-chair of the board of trustees, became acting president. Shortly thereafter, Shipman announced a review of the Columbia University Senate.

Several allegations of antisemitic incidents were made with regard to the protests. Organizers repeatedly denounced antisemitism and affirmed that there was no room for it or "any form of racism" in the movement. Columbia affiliates, including Jewish students and professors, challenged attempts to characterize Palestine solidarity at Columbia as antisemitic—including characterizations and pronouncements made by the federal government and Columbia's Task Force on Antisemitism—describing such attempts as conflating opposition to Zionism with antisemitism and exploiting the accusation of antisemitism to repress Palestine solidarity as well as academic freedom and freedom of expression.

== North Carolina ==
A solidarity encampment zone at University of North Carolina at Charlotte was set up on April 22. They were told by security to disembark but they decided to remain until at least April 25 when the Board of Trustees meets again.

Another encampment was set up at the University of North Carolina at Chapel Hill on April 26. After negotiations, the organizers agreed to take the tents down in exchange for being allowed to stay at the site. Students from North Carolina State University and Duke University joined to form the "Triangle Gaza Solidarity Encampment." On April 29, after university administrators issued an ultimatum to leave, police dispersed the encampment and detained 36 people, placing six under arrest.

A pro-Palestinian rally was held at Duke University on April 26. Police arrested a woman during a protest at North Carolina State University on April 30. The protest had been organized to support demonstrators at UNC-Chapel Hill.

An encampment was set up at Wake Forest University on May 1. Campus police dismantled it on May 3. At the University of North Carolina at Asheville, protesters staged a "soft encampment" protest. Organizers said they would leave when the semester ended and would not stay overnight.

A protest march was held at North Carolina A&T State University on May 3.

== Ohio ==
Officers move into the Ohio State University South Oval to arrest protesters while Muslim students are praying. Protesters chant "let them pray," April 25, 2024.

On April 19, SJP organizers at Miami University staged a walkout with about 15 students in support of protestors that had been arrested at Columbia. The University of Cincinnati SJP chapter promoted the Ohio State University encampments. The same day, students at Case Western Reserve University held a die-in during Admitted Students Day. Police detained at least twenty people at an encampment at Case Western on April 29.

On April 29, students at Oberlin College held a rally and established an encampment. The month before, student representatives of Students for a Free Palestine and Jews for a Free Palestine met with administrators to discuss a formal divestment from Israeli companies.

On April 30, a protest was held at Denison University. The day after, protests were held at Ohio University and Kenyon College.

On May 2, an encampment was set up at Miami University.

On May 4, a protest was held at Kent State University. The protest occurred during a ceremony marking the 54th anniversary of the Kent State shootings, where National Guard members shot and killed four people during an anti-war protest.

On May 11, police at Xavier University arrested two protesters outside of the university's undergraduate ceremony. The two were charged with criminal trespassing, a misdemeanor, and conspiracy while wearing disguise, a felony charge for committing a crime (including misdemeanors) with two or more people while wearing masks.

Protests were held at the University of Cincinnati on October 7. A protest was held at the College of Wooster on October 25.

=== Ohio State University ===
A series of protests at Ohio State University by pro-Palestinian demonstrators are ongoing and began on-campus following the outbreak of the Gaza war and genocide. A solidarity encampment was constructed on OSU's South Oval on April 25, 2024 in solidarity with the Columbia University encampment. Riot police then made 36 arrests against student protesters — the largest mass arrests in campus history since the 1969–1970 Vietnam War protests.

The protester demands of OSU include "financial divestment, academic boycott, financial disclosure, acknowledging the genocide, and ending targeted policing".

Pro-Palestinian groups have been critical of the university's responses to the protests, which have included allowing state troopers to aim sniper rifles at students during the dispersal of the Gaza Solidarity Encampment, suspending a pro-Palestinian student organization, and blocking the Undergraduate Student Government's attempts at passing legislation for financial divestment from Israel after receiving pressure from officials in Zionist organization Hillel International.

Following protests, the OSU administration coordinated multi-agency police operations, implemented a campus-wide chalking ban, and expelled pro-Palestinian social media influencer Guy Christensen; state-level officials floated invoking a 1953 anti-KKK statute against pro-Palestinian protesters who wore face coverings, suggested terminating faculty members who encourage or engage in "violence on campus", and passed the "CAMPUS" Act to formalize free speech restrictions; and officials in the Trump administration revoked the student visa of at least one pro-Palestinian protester at OSU and threatened to withdraw funding from OSU if they did not sufficiently "combat antisemitism" on campus. These actions have been met with multiple lawsuits over alleged violations of First and Fourteenth Amendment rights.

The university has insisted their actions are politically neutral, with OSU President Ted Carter stating the "university's long-standing space rules are content neutral and are enforced uniformly". Critics argue the university engages in selective enforcement of university space rules, enforcing policies disproportionately against pro-Palestinian groups and not similarly against other groups on campus.

== Oklahoma ==
Demonstrations were held at the University of Oklahoma and University of Tulsa on May 1. The day after, a protest was held at Oklahoma State University-Stillwater.

== Oregon ==
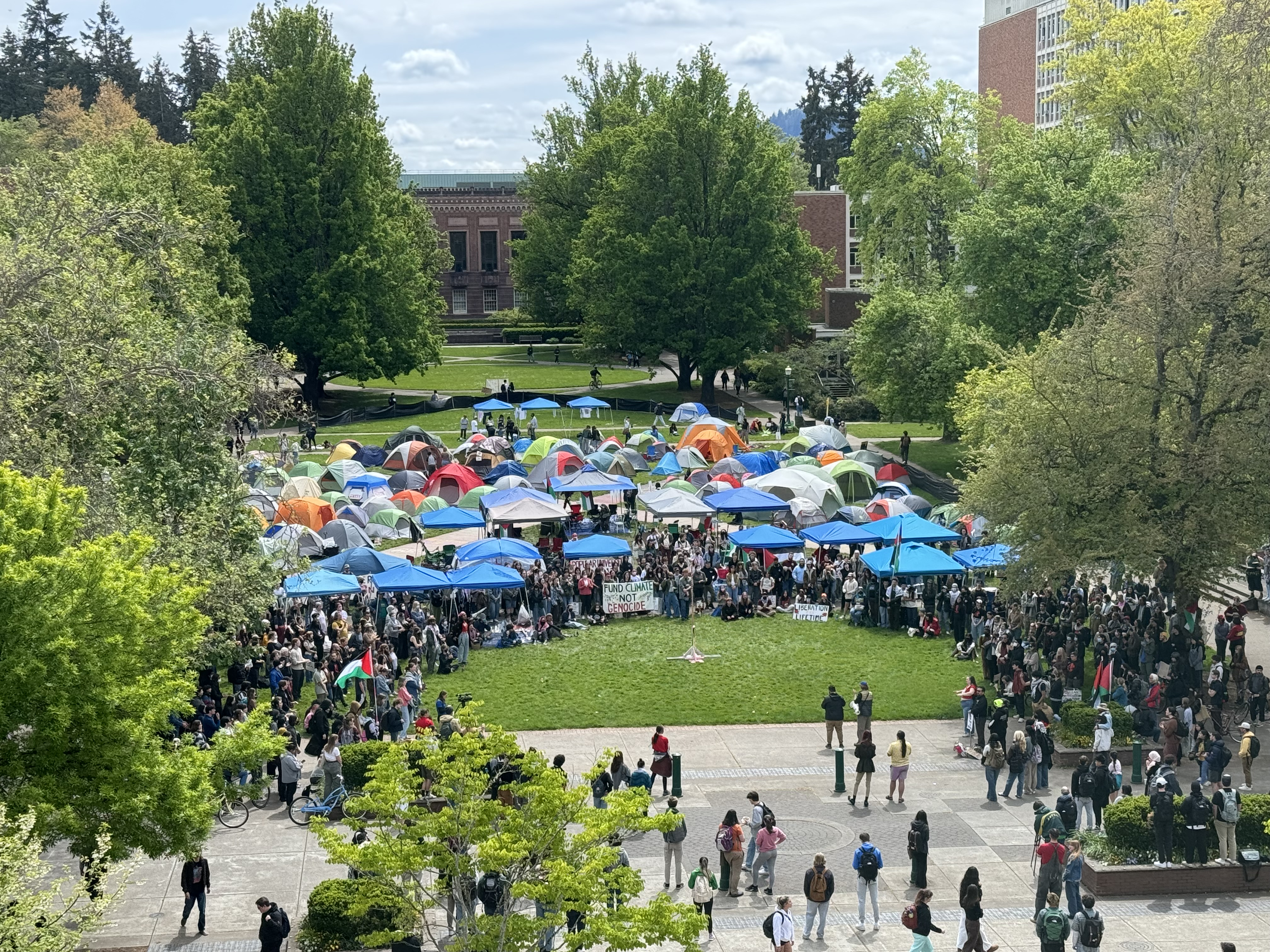
Student encampment at the University of Oregon, May 1, 2024

Oregon State University students held a campus protest on Friday, April 26. Protests were also held at Lewis & Clark College and Reed College.

Following protests at Portland State University (PSU), university president Ann Cudd announced on April 26 that the school would pause all ties to Boeing. While the university does not currently invest in the company, it had previously accepted philanthropic gifts from Boeing. On April 29, protesters occupied the Branford Price Millar Library at PSU. On May 2, police arrested 12 people occupying the library. On the same day, police also arrested a man who drove a vehicle into a crowd of protestors at PSU.

An encampment was set up outside of the University of Oregon on April 29.

On May 3, protesters at Willamette University began occupying a university building.

On May 15, protestors at Oregon State University set up an encampment. Also on May 15, roughly 100 students held a walk-out and protest at Southern Oregon University.

=== Portland State University ===
From April 25 to May 3, students occupied the Branford Price Millar Library on the Portland State University campus, in Portland, Oregon. One man was detained after he drove towards protesters in a car and pepper sprayed several of them. 32 arrests were made in total.

== Pennsylvania ==
Students at Swarthmore College built a solidarity encampment on campus on April 22.

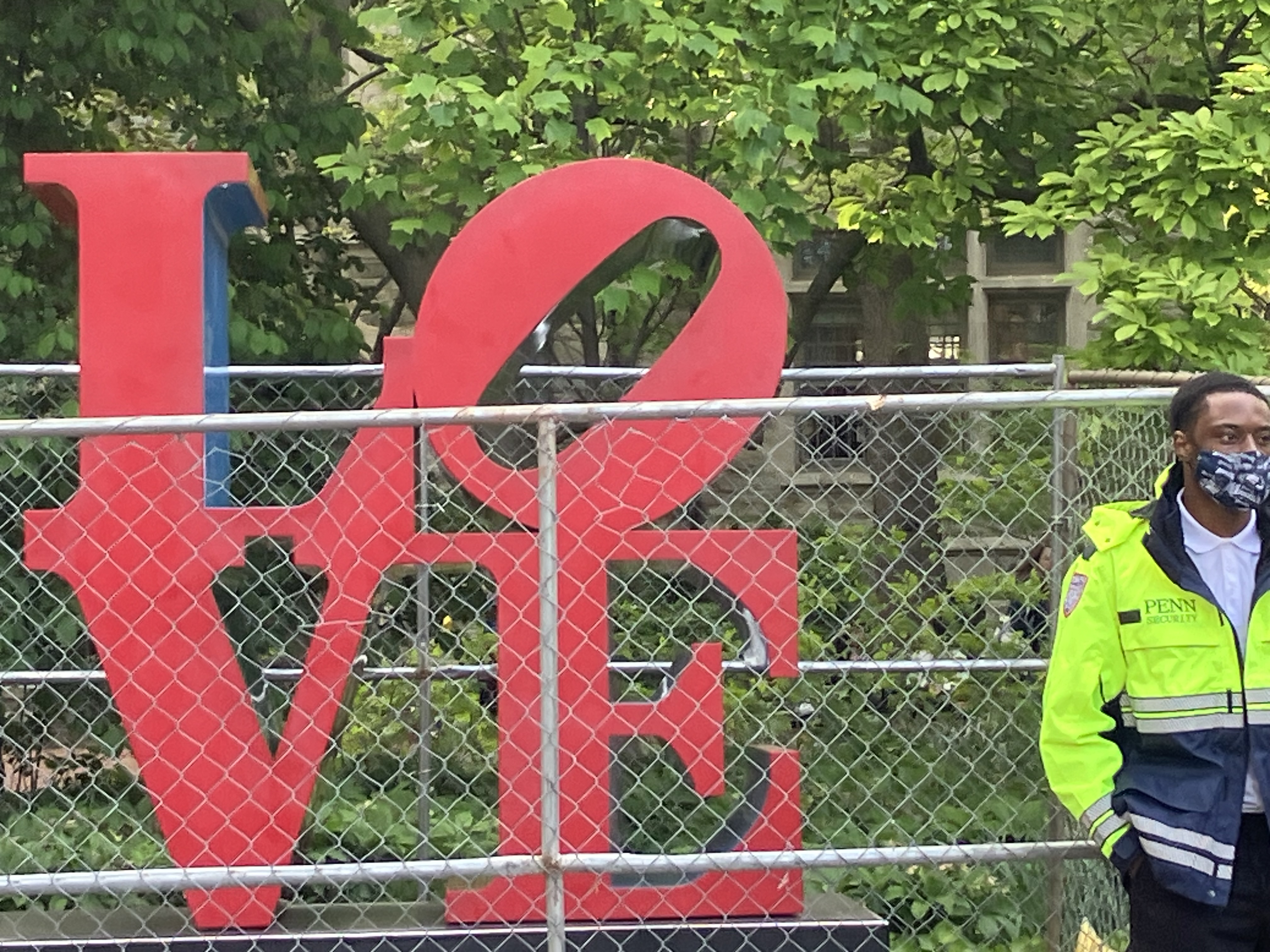
The Love statue near 36th Street and Locust Walk fenced in and guarded by Penn security

At University of Pennsylvania, college leaders announced they would be holding a "listening session" but students expressed disinterest. On April 24, hundreds of demonstrators marched through Philadelphia, stopping at Temple University, City Hall, and Drexel University, before setting up a solidarity encampment at University of Pennsylvania. On May 1, the seventh day of the encampment at the University of Pennsylvania, a man was arrested after spraying the encampment with an unknown chemical substance.

On April 25, students at Haverford College set up an encampment, and two days later students at nearby Bryn Mawr College did the same.

Students at University of Pittsburgh declared a "Liberation Zone" on the lawn outside the Cathedral of Learning and made demands that the university declare and divest from investing in Israel. City police and campus police asked the group to move off-campus to nearby Schenley Plaza and the group agreed. The encampment at Schenley Plaza was cleared in late April and two people were arrested. On 2 June, another encampment was established outside the Cathedral of Learning on Pitt's campus. After police arrived, one protestor was arrested for attempting to bring water into the encampment.

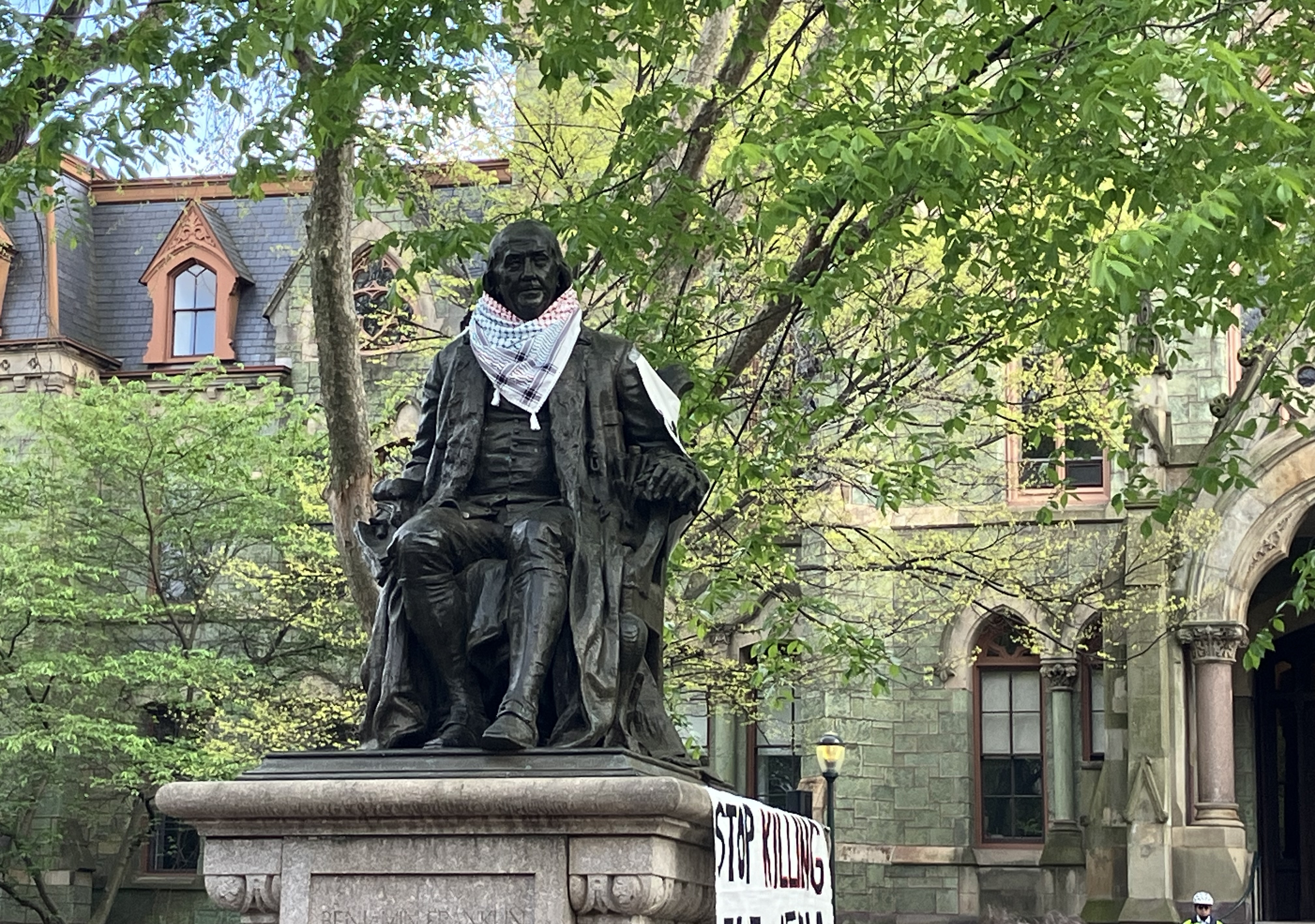
A Keffiyeh and protest signs hanging on a statue of Ben Franklin at Penn

Protests were also held at Lehigh University in Bethlehem, Lafayette College in Easton, Temple University in Philadelphia, Pennsylvania State University in State College, Millersville University, Dickinson College in Carlisle, Villanova University, Gettysburg College, Indiana University of Pennsylvania, and Muhlenberg College in Allentown.

On May 10, police raided and disbursed the encampment at University of Pennsylvania. At least 33 were arrested. Protesters marched through University City in Philadelphia to the home of UPenn's interim president.

A new encampment was set up at Drexel University on May 18. By 8pm, officers from Drexel University Police and the Philadelphia Police Department set up a blockade to prevent people from entering the encampment. On May 20, Drexel president John Fry pledged that "all necessary steps" would be taken to clear the encampment. Campus operations returned to normal despite extra security surrounding the encampment.

On May 3 2025, a four day encampment at Swarthmore College was broken by police. Nine were arrested.

== Rhode Island ==
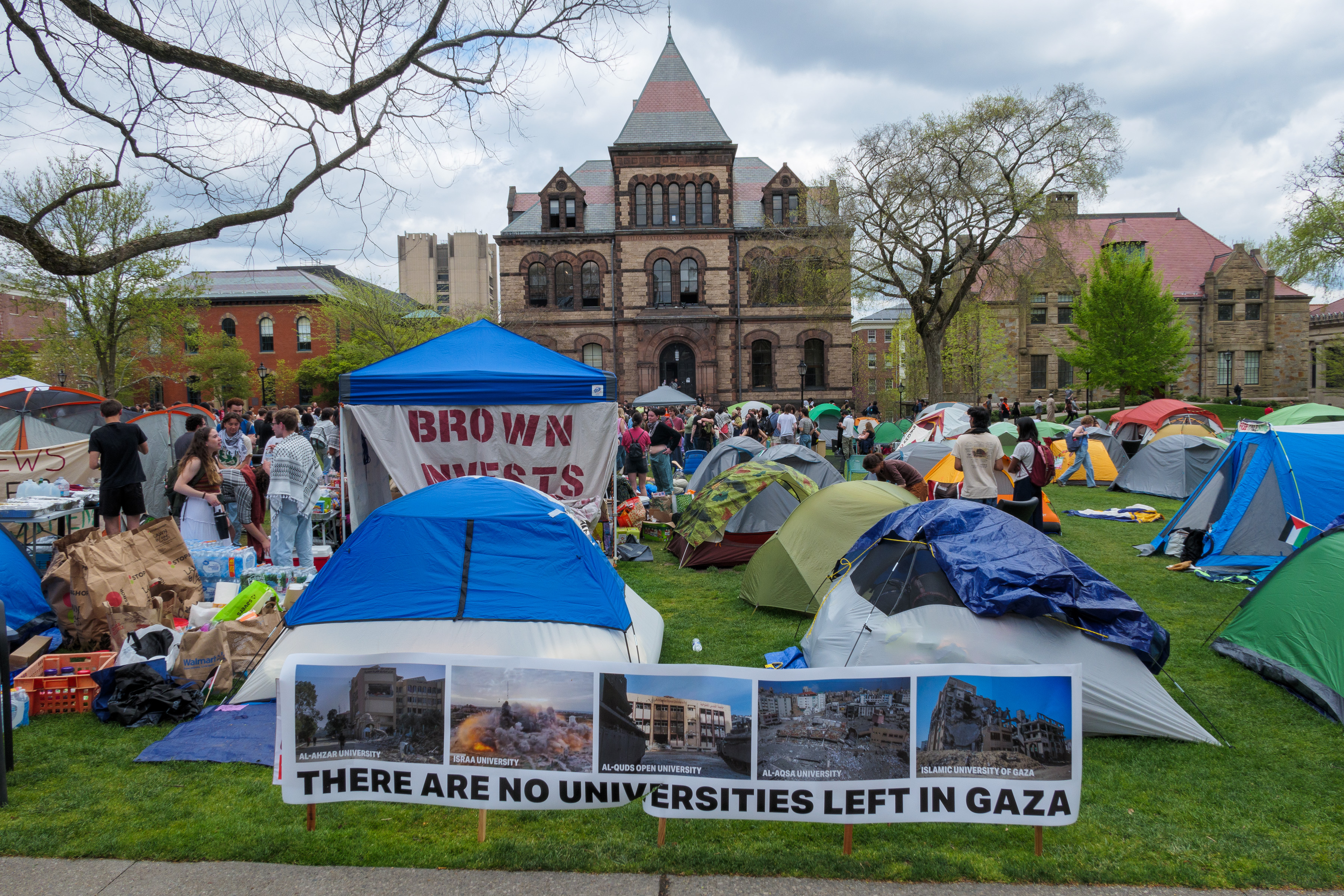
Brown University encampment, April 29, 2024

At 6 am on April 24, about 80 students set up tents on the Main Green at Brown University in Providence, Rhode Island. Their demands were to drop charges against 41 students who took part in a sit-in last December and that the university divest from "companies enabling and profiting from Israel's military occupation of Palestinian territory." On April 30, encampment organizers came to an agreement with Brown's governing body to clear the Main Green encampment in exchange for the body to vote on divestment from companies affiliated with Israel in October 2024.

Following the clearing of the Brown University encampment, protests were held at the Rhode Island School of Design and Salve Regina University on May 2. In addition, a protest was held at Providence College the day before.

On May 6, protesters staged a sit-in at a Rhode Island School of Design building.

== South Carolina ==
Several protests were held at the University of South Carolina. Two people were arrested after one protest, which was held in a dining hall.

A protest was held at Clemson University on May 4.

== Tennessee ==
On April 6, Vanderbilt University expelled three students following a 24-hour sit-in in an administrative building; according to the university, the students forced their way into the building and injured a community service officer. Students continued the encampment on campus. On April 30, a group of protesters held a sit-in at the All Saints' Chapel at Sewanee: The University of the South.

On May 1, both pro-Palestine and pro-Israel peaceful protest groups arrived at the University of Tennessee campus in Knoxville. The protestors were given a deadline of 9 p.m. on May 2 to vacate the public space. When this deadline was not met, nine (seven students and two unaffiliated) were arrested and later released with citations. Palestine supporters continued to assemble at the location on May 3.

== Texas ==
Police units separating observers from protestors on the main lawn of the University of Texas at Austin. The Texas State Capitol can be seen in the distance.

Around 100 University of Texas at Dallas students participated in an April 23 occupation of a campus building, holding a sit-in in a hallway near the university president's office. UT Dallas students established an encampment on May 1, which was removed by the end of the day.

The Texas A&M University chapter of Young Democratic Socialists of America held a march through the Texas A&M campus on April 23. The next day, students at the University of Texas at Arlington held a walk-out and protest. On April 25, a protest was held at Texas A&M University–Corpus Christi. A protest was also held at Texas Tech University in Lubbock.

The San Antonio chapter of the Party for Socialism and Liberation and the University of Texas at San Antonio SJP chapter organized an April 24 rally on the UTSA campus. At Rice University in Houston, protesters established a "liberated zone" on a campus green space. Also in Houston, students at the University of Houston held a peaceful protest outside the student center.

On April 30 around 1,000 people held a protest at the University of North Texas. The demonstration lasted roughly two hours. Another protest was held at Texas State University.

On May 1, students at six universities in the San Antonio area delivered letters to their respective college presidents, with demonstrations being held at UT San Antonio, Texas A&M University–San Antonio, and San Antonio College.

On May 2, an encampment was set up at UT Arlington.

On May 8, police arrested two people at the University of Houston after an encampment was set up by protesters.

=== UT Austin ===
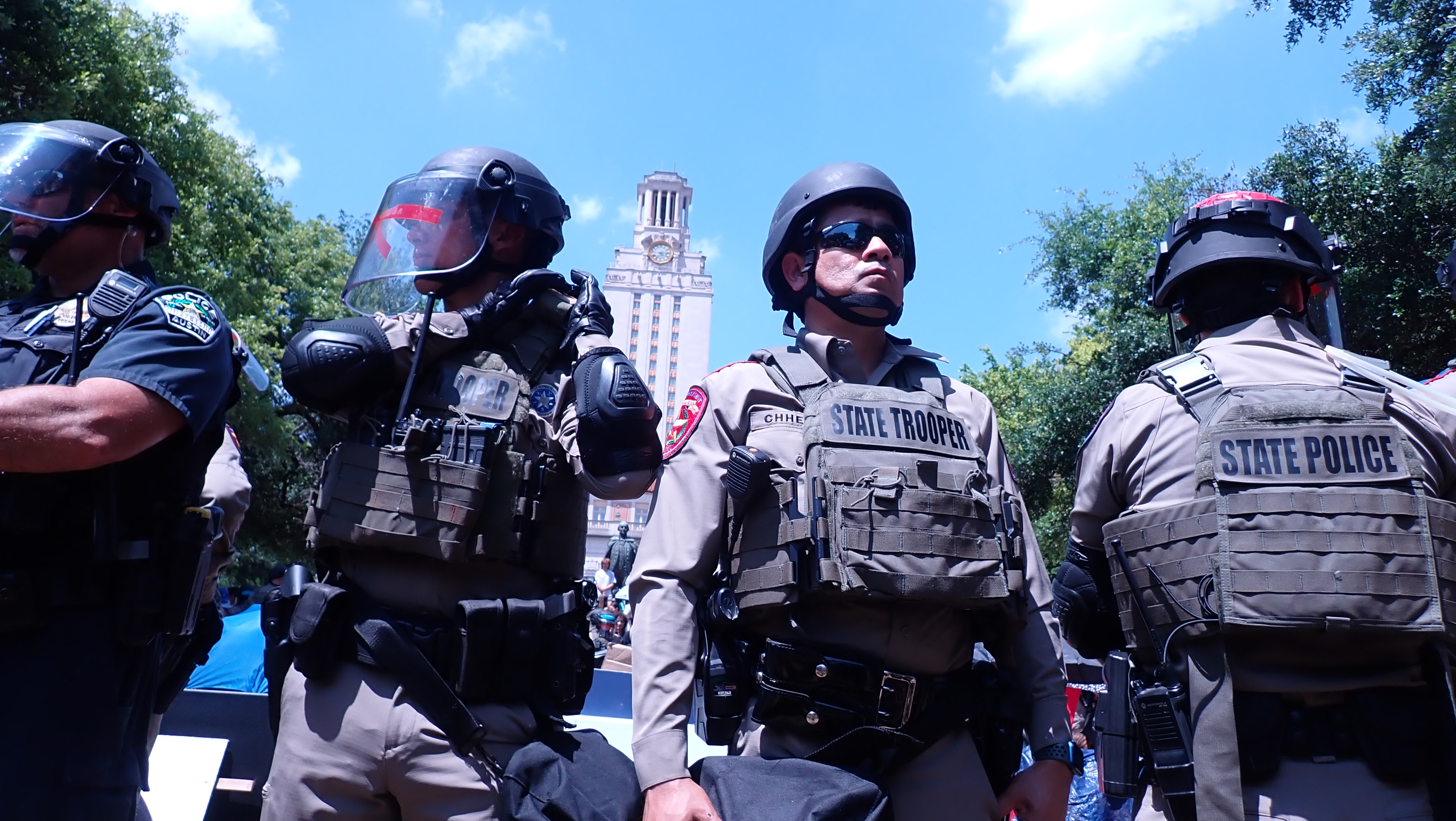
Riot police on the main lawn. The UT Tower can be seen in the background.

A large student and faculty Pro-Palestinian protest occurred on April 24, 2024, demanding a ceasefire in the Gaza war and that the university divest from companies profiting from Israel's actions. In response, the university, under the explicit direction of President Hartzell, requested the assistance of the Austin Police Department (APD) and the Texas Department of Public Safety (DPS), in coordination with Texas Governor Greg Abbott, in an attempt to quell said protests and an "occupation" of the university, in contrast to free speech on campus laws praised by Abbott and the university in prior years. The deployment of multiple police units led to the confirmed arrest of 57 protesters, including a photojournalist for Fox 7 Austin, with several more detained. Charges were then dismissed against 46 protesters the next day, leading to their subsequent release, with the charges against the remaining 11 protesters dropped on April 26, 2024.

A photographer with local television station Fox 7 Austin was arrested after reportedly being caught in a scuffle between law enforcement and students on April 24, with the station reposting the viral footage to Twitter, stating their employee was pushed by an officer into another before being thrown to the ground and arrested. Another Texas journalist was knocked down and seen bleeding before being handed off to emergency medical staff by police. The officers ended up leaving after a few hours and about 300 demonstrators moved back to sit and chant near the clock tower.

On April 25, 2024, more than 1,000 students, faculty, and staff protested outside of the Main Building calling for President Hartzell's resignation, along with the local chapter of the American Association of University Professors circulating a petition for an official motion of no-confidence against him. Within 72 hours, more than 500 professors and instructors, around 13% of all faculty, had already signed the petition, including several department chairs, such as Diana Marculescu, and a dean for the College of Liberal Arts. On April 29, 2024, at 8:30 a.m. Central Daylight Time, the letter was formally delivered to President Hartzell, with 539 signatures, with the form remaining open for further signatures. A separate group of 165 faculty, including Steve Vladeck, also signed an open letter condemning President Hartzell's actions for quelling free speech and endangering the campus community.

On April 29, 2024, a surprise protest occurred where protestors set up tents on campus and refused to leave when confronted by UTPD. Subsequently, APD and Texas DPS officers arrived at the scene and surrounded the encampment, leading to its dismantling, and the arrest of several protestors. Several protestors then moved to confront the police to block their departure and further, leading to the usage of pepper spray and stun grenades by law enforcement. Additionally, several protestors had to receive medical attention due to the sweltering heat. In total, 79 protestors were arrested, with 78 criminal trespassing charges, one "obstructing a highway" charge, and one "interference of public duties" charge filed. This escalation drew further condemnation, above all for the usage of riot-dispersing tactics. Travis County Attorney Delia Garza further stated that the way that the university handled the protests put a strain on the local criminal justice system, specifically reprimanding the sending of protestors to jail for low-level charges.

== Utah ==
On April 29, students at the University of Utah set up an encampment at the University of Utah Circle. Later that night, police dispersed the encampment and arrested 17 people.

On May 1, a protest was held at Utah State University.

== Vermont ==
On April 28, encampments were set up at the University of Vermont (UVM), Middlebury College, and Sterling College. Protestors at UVM held a "Liberation Seder" led by Jewish Voice for Peace and UVM Jews for Liberation. In addition to demands similar to those of other encampments, UVM students called for the cancellation of a planned commencement speech by Linda Thomas-Greenfield. On 1 May, UVM said it would disclose the investments in its endowment portfolio in response to student demands. On 3 May, UVM agreed to cancel Thomas-Greenfield's commencement speech.

On May 1, a small encampment was set up at Vermont State University's (VSU) Lyndon campus. Two days later, a sit-in protest was held at VSU's Castleton campus.

== Virginia ==
Protesters at the University of Virginia (UVA) held a die-in on April 19. An encampment was later set up on April 30. On May 4, police in riot gear, using pepper spray, cleared the encampment at UVA, arresting 27 people.

On April 26, students at the University of Mary Washington set up an encampment on the Jefferson Square lawn. On April 27, police arrested and charged 12 protestors with trespassing while clearing the encampment.

On April 26, students at Virginia Tech set up an encampment outside the Graduate Life Center. Protestors called on the Virginia Tech Foundation to disclose its investments and to divest from Israeli companies, and denounced an antisemitic harassment campaign led by Hokies for Israel and Hillel at Virginia Tech. On April 28, police cleared the encampment, arresting 82 people.

On April 29, students set up an encampment outside of the library at Virginia Commonwealth University. That same evening, police in riot gear surrounded the encampment and shot tear gas at the peaceful protestors to clear the area. 13 people were arrested and charged with trespassing.

A protest was held at Christopher Newport University on April 30. Protests were also held at James Madison University and Old Dominion University on May 1.

In September 2024, students at the Virginia Commonwealth University walked out in protest of new campus guidelines against protests.

== Washington ==
Around 10 people set up an encampment at Evergreen State College on April 23.

On April 24, a protest was held at Washington State University.

On April 25, students at Whitman College held a walk-out and protest at Ankeny Field, placing 340 white flags for Palestinians killed since October 7. Protesters later set up an encampment on May 3.

Protesters set up an encampment at the University of Washington on April 29.

On May 1, a protest was held at Gonzaga University. An encampment was also set up at the University of Puget Sound.

On May 2, a protest was held at Seattle University. The day after, a protest was held at Washington State University Vancouver. On May 6, a protest was held at Eastern Washington University.

A walkout was held at Everett Community College.

On May 14, an encampment was established at Western Washington University.

== Wisconsin ==
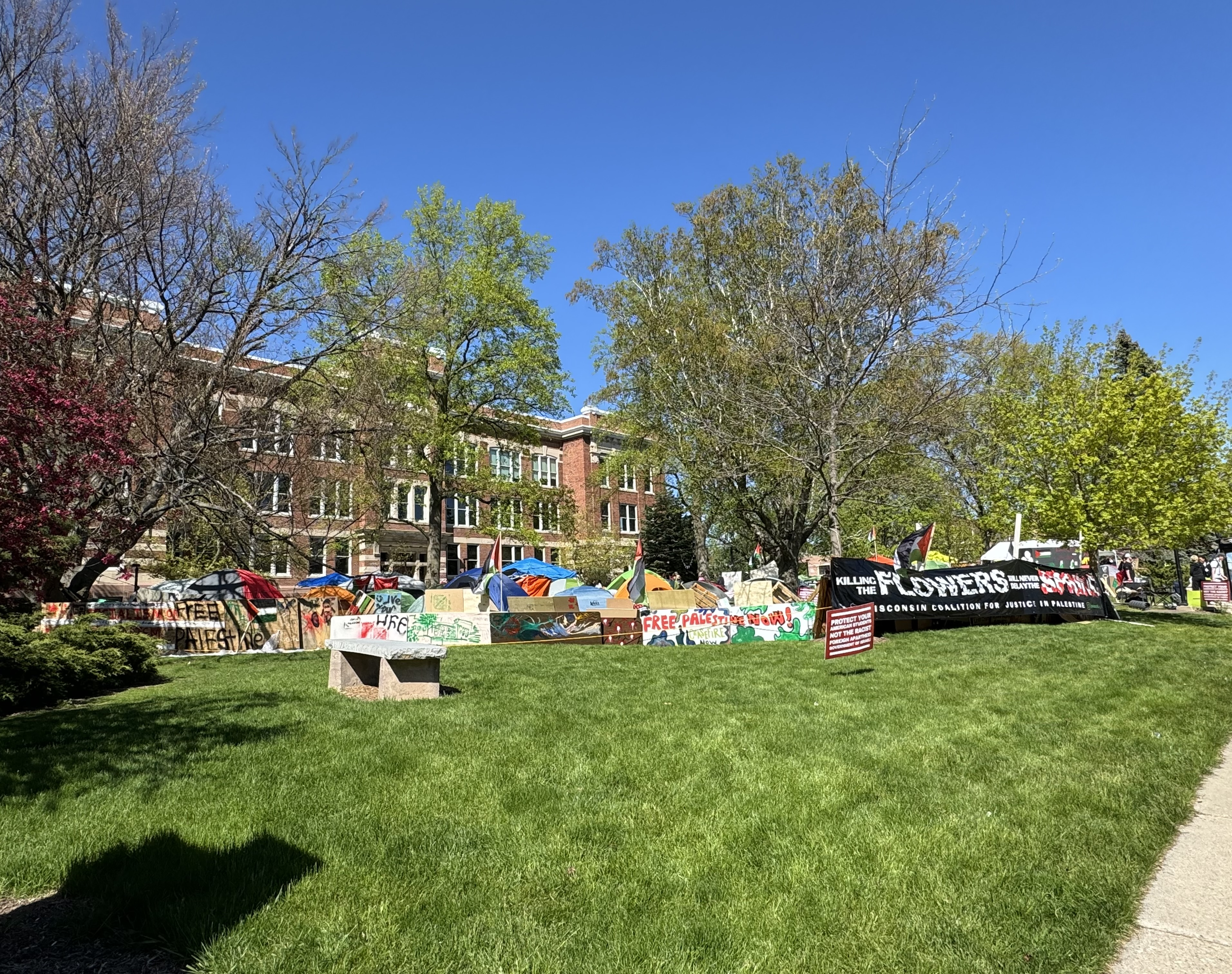
The encampment at the University of Wisconsin–Milwaukee on May 3

Protests were held and encampments were established at the University of Wisconsin–Madison and University of Wisconsin–Milwaukee on April 29.

On May 1, police in riot gear cleared the encampment at the University of Wisconsin–Madison, arresting 34 people. The encampments were promptly rebuilt. Two professors, Sami Schalk and Samer Alatout, were among the arrested; Alatout was bloodied by police. Three members of the police were injured.

On May 1, protests was held at the University of Wisconsin-Green Bay and Stevens Point. Protests were held at Marquette University and University of Wisconsin-Whitewater on May 2, and others were held at the University of Wisconsin-La Crosse and Eau Claire the day after.

On May 10, University of Wisconsin-Madison protesters agreed to voluntarily dismantle their encampment after the university agreed to increase support for students affected by the crises in Palestine and Ukraine.

On May 23, an encampment was set up at Lawrence University.

== Other ==
An encampment was set up outside the Biden School for Public Policy at the University of Delaware on April 24.

Several dozen people attended a protest at the University of Hawaiʻi at Mānoa on May 3.

A protest was held outside the library at the University of Idaho on April 25.

A protest was held outside the University Center at the University of Montana on April 28. Protesters demonstrated outside a fundraiser where Donald Trump Jr. and other Republicans were meeting.

A protest was held outside of the Nebraska Union at the University of Nebraska–Lincoln on May 1.

On May 6, students at the University of Puerto Rico, Río Piedras Campus established an encampment.

A protest was held at the University of Wyoming on May 3.

On April 28, a protest march was held at West Virginia University.

== See also ==
- Lists of pro-Palestinian protests
- List of George Floyd protests in the United States
- List of March for Our Lives locations
