= List of military engagements of the Middle Eastern crisis (2023–present) =

Dynamic list of military conflicts

The Middle East is experiencing an ongoing series of interrelated wars, conflicts, and heightened instability as a result of the Gaza war and genocide. These have primarily consisted of conflicts between Israel and Iran-backed militias that form the "Axis of Resistance", including Hamas in the Gaza Strip, (Note: Sometimes included in the "Axis of Resistance".) Hezbollah in Lebanon, and the Houthis in Yemen; Iran itself has also been involved. Allies of Israel, including the United States, the United Kingdom, and France, have also intervened militarily in various theaters. The crisis has involved all Middle Eastern countries, significantly affecting the region as a whole. Major conflict zones include the Gaza Strip, the West Bank, southern Lebanon, Syria, Yemen, and the Red Sea, as well as the conflict zones of the Iran–Israel conflict.

This article lists all military engagements of the crisis, which includes battles, military operations, and incidents of combat. Belligerents are not included due to the large-scale intensity and spillover of the conflict.

== List of engagements ==
| Conflict | Event | Engagements | Details |
|---|---|---|---|
| Gaza war (2023–present) | October 7 attacks | Battles and attacks: Nahal Oz attack; Battle of Re'im; Battle of Sufa; 2023 Israeli female tank crew fight; Nirim attack; Zikim attack; Battle of Nir Am; Nir Oz attack; Nir Yitzhak attack; Holit attack; Battle of Ofakim; Battle of Sderot; Capture of the Erez Crossing; Capture of the Kerem Shalom border crossing; Storming of Paga Outpost; Standoff at Rahat; Standoff at Mefalsim; Massacres: Alumim massacre; Be'eri massacre; Ein HaShlosha massacre; Kfar Aza massacre; Kissufim massacre; Netiv HaAsara massacre; Kidnapping and killing of Hersh Goldberg-Polin; Yakhini massacre; Bomb shelter massacres; Nova music festival massacre; Psyduck music festival massacre; Zikim beach massacre | Date: October 7–8, 2023 (Note: The last gun battle inside Israel between Israeli security forces and Hamas operatives was October 12.) (1 day); Place: Gaza envelope, Southern District, Israel; Attacking forces: Palestinian Joint Operations Room; Hamas; Palestinian Islamic Jihad; Popular Front for the Liberation of Palestine; Democratic Front for the Liberation of Palestine; Al-Aqsa Martyrs' Brigades; Palestinian Mujahideen Movement; Palestinian Freedom Movement; Popular Resistance Committees; Popular Front for the Liberation of Palestine – General Command; Abdul al-Qadir al-Husseini Brigades; Defending forces: Israel; Result: Hamas tactical victory |
| Gaza war (2023–present) | Israeli invasion of the Gaza Strip | Blockade: Israeli blockade of the Gaza Strip (2023–present); Israeli direct action against aid delivery to Gaza; Battles and incursions: Battle of Beit Hanoun; Battle of Jabalia; 1st Battle of Shuja'iyya; 2nd Battle of Shuja'iyya; 1st Battle of Khan Yunis; 2nd Battle of Khan Yunis; Battle of Rafah; Incursion in Shuja'iyya; Incursion in Hamad; 1st Incursion in Khan Yunis; 2nd Incursion in Khan Yunis; North Gaza Insurgency; Siege of North Gaza; Netzarim Corridor clashes; Tel al-Sultan Ambush; May 2025 Gaza offensive; Deir al-Balah offensive; 2025 Gaza City offensive; Siege of Gaza City; Siege of Al-Qarara; Bombings: Israeli bombing of the Gaza Strip: Attacks on refugee camps; Attacks on Jabalia refugee camp; 31 October 2023; Al-Shati refugee camp; July 2024; Al-Maghazi refugee camp; Nuseirat refugee camp; 1st Al-Mawasi refugee camp; 2nd Al-Mawasi refugee camp; 3rd Al-Mawasi refugee camp; 4th Al-Mawasi refugee camp; June 2024 northern Gaza City airstrikes; 22 July 2024 Khan Yunis attack; August 2024 Deir al-Balah attacks; 19 October 2024 Beit Lahia attacks; 29 October 2024 Beit Lahia airstrike; April 2025 Shuja'iyya airstrike; March 2025 Israeli attacks on the Gaza Strip; Attacks on schools; UNRWA school; Abu Hussein school; Al-Sardi school; Al-Awda school; Khadija school; Al-Fakhoora school; Hamama School; Rufaida school; Al-Tabaeen school; Al-Farabi School; Al-Jawni School; Fahmi al-Jarjawi School; Attacks on Palestinians evacuating Gaza City; Attacks on health facilities; Al-Ahli Arab Hospital; Al-Shifa Hospital; Kamal Adwan Hospital; 1st Nasser Hospital; Gaza European Hospital; Al-Aqsa Hospital; 2nd Nasser Hospital; Killing of health workers in the Gaza war; Destruction of cultural heritage; Airstrikes on municipal services; Engineer's Building; Attacks on religious sites; Deir al-Balah mosque; Church of Saint Porphyrius; 12 February 2024 Rafah strikes; Palestinian rocket attacks on Israel: 2023; 2024; 2025; Massacres: Flour Massacre; Kuwait Roundabout mass killings; Killing of Alon Shamriz, Yotam Haim, and Samer Talalka; Killing of Hind Rajab; Tel al-Sultan attack; Killing of Nahida and Samar Anton; 2024 Ra'anana attack; 2024 Rafah hostage raid; World Central Kitchen aid convoy attack; Nuseirat rescue and massacre; Killing of al-Najjar children; Rafah paramedic massacre; Mass detentions in the Gaza war; Al-Baqa Café airstrike; Assassinations; Killing of Yahya Sinwar; Assassination of Abu Obeida | Date: 28 October 2023 – present (2 years, 10 months, 3 weeks and 6 days); Place: Gaza Strip and Israel; Status: Ongoing; De jure ceasefire in effect since 10 October 2025 under second phase of a peace deal; De facto limited war; Territorial changes Approx. 64% of Gaza under Israeli military control as of April 2026; Attacking forces: Israel Popular Forces Fatah-affiliated groups; Defending forces: Palestinian Joint Operations Room; Hamas; Palestinian Islamic Jihad; Popular Front for the Liberation of Palestine; Democratic Front for the Liberation of Palestine; Al-Aqsa Martyrs' Brigades; Palestinian Mujahideen Movement; Palestinian Freedom Movement; Popular Resistance Committees; Popular Front for the Liberation of Palestine – General Command; Abdul al-Qadir al-Husseini Brigades |
| Gaza war (2023–present) | Israeli incursions in the West Bank during the Gaza war | Clashes in West Bank: Israeli incursions in Jenin; Israeli incursions in Tulkarm; 2024 Tulkarm Camp airstrike; Operation Summer Camps; Operation Iron Wall; Operation Five Stones; Operation Protect the Homeland; Operation Protecting the Nation; Killing of Benjamin Achimeir; April 2024 Israeli settler rampages; 2025 al-Funduq shooting; July 2024 West Bank unrest; Killing of Tawfic Abdel Jabbar; Killing of David Ben Avraham; Israeli–Palestinian conflict in Hebron; Clashes near Jordan: 2024 Allenby Bridge shooting; 2025 Allenby Bridge shooting; Clashes in Israel: Lehi Street bombing; 2023 Givat Shaul shooting; 2024 Jaffa shooting; 2025 Gush Etzion Junction attack; 2025 Bat Yam bus bombings; 2025 Ramot Junction shooting; 2025 Harod Valley attack; 2025 Karkur junction ramming attack | Date: 11 October 2023 – present (2 years, 11 months, 1 week and 6 days); Place: Israeli-occupied West Bank with spillover into Israel; Status: Ongoing; Israel establishes full military control over the Jenin, Nur Shams, and Tulkarm refugee camps.; Attacking forces: Israel; Defending forces: Palestinian militias in the West Bank; Palestinian Islamic Jihad; Al-Aqsa Martyrs' Brigades; Hamas; Popular Front for the Liberation of Palestine; Palestinian Mujahideen Movement; Islamic Resistance in Jordan Palestinian Authority |
| Gaza war (2023–present) | Anti-Hamas insurgency in the Gaza Strip | Hamas–Popular Forces conflict: Kerem Shalom aid convoy looting; 2025 Gaza Strip aid distribution killings; Killing of Yasser Abu Shabab; 2026 Al-Maghazi refugee camp raid; 2025 Hamas executions; Conflict with other groups: October 2025 Hamas raid in Khan Yunis; 2025 Hamas–Doghmush conflict; Clashes with Abu Werda Clan | Date: May 2024 – present; Place: Gaza Strip, Palestine; Status: Ongoing; Hamas presence in Rafah is weakened after the Rafah offensive in 2024 with Al-Bayuk coming under the Popular Forces' control; 2025 Hamas–Doghmush conflict and 2025 Hamas executions; The Popular Forces' leader is assassinated by the Abu Suneima family; 2026 Maghazi refugee camp raid; Territorial changes: Eastern Rafah and eastern Khan Yunis come under the control of the Popular Forces; the Ashraf al-Mansi group claims control over parts of northern Gaza as of 14 October 2025; Insurgent forces: Popular Forces; Fatah-aligned groups; Israel; Supported by: United Arab Emirates (allegedly) Non-aligned anti-Hamas clans (Note: No connections to Israel, the Popular Forces, or Fatah.); Defending forces: Hamas-led government; / (Fatah) Pro-Hamas clans/families |
| Gaza war (2023–present) | 2024 Egyptian skirmishes in Rafah (Note: A skirmish between Israeli and Egyptian soldiers occurred near the Rafah crossing, resulting in one Egyptian soldier being killed. Both countries accused each other of opening fire first. Reuters however cited Egyptian sources as stating that the Egyptian soldier shot at IDF soldiers who crossed into Egypt while pursuing and killing several Palestinians. The IDF troops fired back, resulting in his death and sparking a clash between two sides which left several IDF soldiers and one Egyptian soldier wounded. i24NEWS quoted IDF sources accusing Egyptian soldiers of firing at the Engineering Corps in Rafah first, resulting in several Egyptian soldiers being wounded while the IDF received no casualties. The New Arab meanwhile reported that seven IDF soldiers were wounded. An Egyptian soldier wounded in the clash later succumbed to his wounds, although the state-affiliated Al Qahera News cited a security source as denying it.) | | Date: 27 May 2024; Place: Near the Rafah Border Crossing, Rafah, Gaza Strip; Result: Inconclusive; Attacking forces: Egypt; Defending forces: Israel (Palestine) Palestinian Joint Operations Room |
| Hezbollah–Israel conflict (2023–present) | 2024 Lebanon war | Battles: Battle of Odaisseh; 2024 Kafr Kila clashes; 2024 Ayta al-Shaab clashes; 2024 Maroun al-Ras clashes; 2024 Ramyah clashes; November 2024 Batroun raid; Non-battle combat: 2023 Hezbollah Projectile Attacks; Israeli attacks on the Lebanese health sector during the Israel-Hezbollah conflict (2023–present); Assassination of Saleh al-Arouri; Majdal Shams attack; 2024 Haret Hreik airstrike; Attacks on journalists during the Israel–Hezbollah conflict (2023–present); August 2024 Nabatieh attack; August 2024 Israel–Lebanon strikes; 2024 Lebanon electronic device attacks; 20 September 2024 Beirut attack; September 2024 Israeli attacks against Lebanon; 2024 Hezbollah headquarters strike; 2024 Beirut medical center airstrike; 2024 Derdghaya Melkite Church airstrike; October 2024 Bachoura airstrike; 2024 Hezbollah drone strike on Binyamina; October 2024 Aitou airstrike; Attack on Nabatieh municipal council; 2024 drone attack on Benjamin Netanyahu's residence; 2024 Sahel Alma airstrike; 2024 Basta airstrikes; 2024 Beqaa Valley airstrikes; January 2025 southern Lebanon attack; 2025 Sidon airstrike; November 2025 Israeli attack in Beirut; 2025 Bint Jbeil drone strike; Israeli attack on Ramyah UNIFIL post; Israeli airstrikes on Al Qard Al Hasan; 2024 Tyre airstrikes; October 2024 Dahieh airstrike | Date: 17 September – 27 November 2024 (2 months, 1 week and 3 days) Invasion phase: 1 October– 27 November 2024 (1 month, 3 weeks and 5 days (Note: The IDF announced the start of the operation at 2:00 AM local time, following earlier reports of Israeli incursions, which had been denied by the IDF.)); Place: Lebanon and Israel; Result: Israeli victory; 2024 Israel–Lebanon ceasefire agreement; Territorial changes: Continued Israeli occupation in parts of Southern Lebanon; Attacking forces: Israel; Defending forces: Hezbollah Amal Movement Islamic Group SSNP-L (Yemen) Houthi movement Popular Front for the Liberation of Palestine Palestinian Islamic Jihad Islamic Resistance in Iraq Lebanon (Note: The Lebanese government stated they will stay out of the conflict between Hezbollah and Israel, but would respond to Israeli attacks on their positions.) UNIFIL (Note: Although UNIFIL is a peacekeeping force and is not actively engaged in hostilities, its positions have been targeted and its peacekeepers have suffered casualties.) |
| Hezbollah–Israel conflict (2023–present) | 2026 Lebanon war | Battles: Battle of Khiam (2026); Battle of Bint Jbeil (2026); 2026 Israeli crossing of the Litani River; Battle of Haddatha; Battle of Zawtar al-Sharqiyah; Non-battle combat: Killing of Pierre al-Rahi; 8 April 2026 Israeli attacks on Lebanon; 2026 attack on UNIFIL post in Aadchit al-Qusayr; 2026 Ramlet al-Baida airstrike; Desecration of Christian statues in Debel | Date: 2 March 2026 – present (6 months, 3 weeks and 1 day); Place: Lebanon and Israel; Result: De jure temporary ceasefire; Israeli ground operations in southern Lebanon began on 16 March 2026.; Lebanese general elections postponed to 2028.; Attacking forces: Israel; Defending forces: Hezbollah; Amal Movement (Note: The Amal Movement has played an active role in hostilities. Paramedics belonging to the Amal Movement's Islamic Risala Scout Association have been targeted in Israeli airstrikes.); Attacked by Israel: Palestinian Islamic Jihad; Hamas; Islamic Group; Iran; Islamic Revolutionary Guard Corps; Quds Force Lebanon (Note: Lebanese soldiers have been killed in Israeli drone attacks. The Lebanese army arrested armed Hezbollah members.) (United Nations) UNIFIL (Note: UNIFIL peacekeepers have been attacked by the IDF, and have engaged in a clash with Hezbollah.) Syria (Note: Syria declared its support for the disarmament of Hezbollah following the outbreak of the war. In response, Hezbollah struck Syrian army positions near Damascus. Syrian authorities began closing smuggling routes used by Hezbollah along the Lebanese border. For further information, see Syria in the 2026 Iran war.) |
| Red Sea crisis | Attacks: Houthi attacks on commercial vessels; Hijacking of the Galaxy Leader; Attacks on the MV Maersk Hangzhou; Marlin Luanda missile strike; Sinking of the MV Rubymar; Attack on MV True Confidence; 30 May 2024 attacks on Yemen; Attacks on the MV Tutor; July 2024 Houthi–Israel attacks; Attacks on the Sounion; 29 September 2024 Israeli attacks on Yemen; December 2024 Israeli airstrikes in Yemen; 10 January 2025 Israeli attack on Yemen; Operation Rough Rider; 2025 Ras Isa oil terminal airstrikes; 2025 Saada prison airstrike; 2025 Houthi attack on Tel Aviv airport; September 2025 Israeli attacks in Yemen; 2025 Israeli attacks in Yemen; 2026 Houthi strikes on Israel; Operations:-: Operation Sankalp; Operation Prosperity Guardian; Operation Aspides; Operation Poseidon Archer | | Date: 19 October 2023 – present (2 years, 11 months and 5 days); Place: Red Sea, Gulf of Aden (esp. Bab-el-Mandeb), Arabian Sea, Mediterranean Sea, (Note: The Houthis have claimed several attacks on ships in the Mediterranean, though none have been confirmed.) Israel, Saudi Arabia, Egypt, and Yemen; Status: Israeli Port of Eilat enters bankruptcy and shuts down; Disruption of international maritime trade and supply chain; Beginning of Operation Sankalp on 14 December 2023; Beginning of Operation Prosperity Guardian on 18 December 2023; Missile strikes against Houthi-controlled territory started in January 2024; Beginning of Operation Aspides on 19 February 2024; Repeated missile and drone attacks prompted Israel to intervene in 2024 and 2025; Intensification of US airstrikes in March 2025; Ceasefire between the US and Houthis; Attacks halted with the beginning of the Gaza peace plan on 10 October 2025; Resumption of attacks against Israel on 28 March 2026 as part of 2026 Iran war; Attacking forces: Axis of Resistance; Houthis (Note: Political legitimacy of all Houthi-led government bodies has been rejected by the United Nations, rival Yemeni factions, the Gulf Cooperation Council, and the United States.); Iran (Note: Multiple sources indicate that the Iranian government has deployed military personnel to Houthi-controlled Yemen who are actively involved in attacks on commercial shipping.); Hezbollah; Islamic Resistance in Iraq; Defending forces: Israel; Prosperity Guardian: United States; United Kingdom; Australia; Bahrain; Canada; Denmark; New Zealand; Norway; Seychelles; Singapore; Sri Lanka; Aspides: Belgium; Estonia; Finland; France; Germany; Greece; Italy; Latvia; Netherlands; Sweden; China; Egypt; India; Pakistan; Saudi Arabia |
| Attacks on US bases during the Middle Eastern crisis (2023–present) | Tower 22 drone attack; February 2024 United States airstrikes in Iraq and Syria | | Date: 17 October 2023 – 4 February 2024 (3 months, 2 weeks and 4 days) 22 April 2024 – 23 December 2024 (8 months and 1 day); Place: Iraq, Jordan, and Syria; Status: Iraqi militias temporarily halt attacks on US forces until April 2024 The US withdraws from Hemo base in Northeastern Syria The SDF launches the Deir ez-Zor offensive in response to the ongoing attacks.; Attacking forces: Iran Ba'athist Syria (until 2024) Proxies: Islamic Resistance in Iraq Syrian Hezbollah Liwa Fatemiyoun Popular Mobilization Forces; Defending forces: United States United Kingdom Supported by: Jordan (Democratic Autonomous Administration of North and East Syria) Rojava (Syrian opposition) Al-Tanf Garrison |
| Conflicts in Syria | Syrian civil war (Note: (from 7 October 2023 to 27 November 2024)) | Northwestern Syria clashes (October 2023 – November 2024); Turkish military operation in Idlib Governorate (26 November 2024 – 8 December 2024); October 2023 Northern Syria clashes; 2024 anti-Turkish riots in Syria; 2024 Masyaf raid | Date: 7 October 2023 to 27 November 2024; Place: Syria; Factions: List of armed factions during the Syrian civil war |
| Conflicts in Syria | 2024 Syrian opposition offensives | Northwestern Syria offensive (2024); Battle of Aleppo (2024); 2024 Aleppo University Hospital airstrike; 2024 Hama offensive; Operation Dawn of Freedom; 2024 Homs offensive; Deir ez-Zor offensive (2024); Palmyra offensive (2024); 2024 Al-Mustariha massacre; Southern Syria offensive (2024); Fall of Damascus (2024) | Date: 27 November – 8 December 2024 (1 week and 4 days); Place: Syria; Attacking power: Syrian opposition; Syrian Salvation Government; (Syrian opposition) Syrian Interim Government; Jaysh al-Izza; (Syrian opposition) Suqour al-Sham Brigades; Ansar al-Tawhid; Turkistan Islamic Party in Syria; Imam Bukhari Jamaat; Ajnad al-Kavkaz; Jama'at Ansar al-Islam; (Syrian opposition) Southern Operations Room; (Syria) Decisive Battle Operations Room; (Syria) Burkan al-Furat; (Syria) Al-Busraya Revolutionaries; (Syrian opposition) Syrian Free Army; Supported by: Turkey (denied by Turkey); Ukraine (denied by Ukraine); Defending power: Ba'athist Syria; Iran; Russia; Hezbollah; Popular Mobilization Forces; (Palestine) Palestinian militias; Other parties: Autonomous Administration of North and East Syria CJTF–OIR; Result: Syrian opposition victory; Fall of the Assad regime.; Establishment of the Syrian caretaker government.; End of major battles of the Syrian civil war; Israeli invasion of Syria begins.; Continued conflict in Syria. |
| Conflicts in Syria | Aftermath of the Syrian civil war | Turkish–Syrian National Army offensive in Northern Syria (2024–2025); Manbij offensive (2024); 2024 Kobani clashes; East Aleppo offensive (2024–2025); SDF–Syrian transitional government clashes (2025–2026); Aleppo clashes (2025–2026); Arab tribal insurgency in Eastern Syria; 2026 northeastern Syria offensive; 2025 Palmyra ambush; Operation Hawkeye Strike; Hezbollah–Syria clashes (2024–present); Western Syria clashes; March 2025 Daraa clashes; March 2025 Western Syria clashes; 2025 massacres of Syrian Alawites; 2025 Homs mosque bombing; Israeli invasion of Syria (2024–present): July 2025 Damascus airstrikes; 2024 Palmyra airstrike; Druze insurgency in Southern Syria; 2025 Jaramana clashes; Southern Syria clashes (April–May 2025); April 2025 massacres of Syrian Druze; Southern Syria clashes (July 2025–present); 2025 Suwayda coup d'état attempt; 2026 Jordanian strikes on Syria; Mar Elias Church attack | Date: 8 December 2024 to present; Place: Syria; Factions: Armed factions in the Syrian conflict (2024–present) |
| 3 January 2024 attacks in Kerman | 2024 Kerman bombings | | Date: 3 January 2024 (15:50–16:00 IRST); Place: Kerman, Iran; Attacking forces: Islamic State – Khorasan Province; Defending forces: Iran |
| 3 January 2024 attacks in Kerman | Iranian retaliation | 2024 Iranian missile strikes in Iraq and Syria; Iran–Pakistan border skirmishes; 2023 Iran–Pakistan border skirmishes; 2024 Iran–Pakistan conflict; 2024 Iranian missile strikes in Pakistan; Operation Marg Bar Sarmachar; 2024 Saravan killings | Date: 15 January 2024 to 18 January 2024; Place: Iraq, Syria, Iran and Pakistan; Attacking forces: Iran Baloch Liberation Army Baloch Liberation Front; Defending forces: Iraqi Kurdistan Ba'athist Syria Pakistan Jaysh al-Adl |
| 2025–2026 Southern Yemen campaign | | STC offensive; Yemeni government counter-offensive; Fall of Aden (2026) | Date: 2 December 2025 – 9 January 2026 (1 month and 1 week); Place: Southern Yemen; Attacking forces: Southern Transitional Council (STC); Supported by: United Arab Emirates; Defending forces: Yemeni Government (PLC); Hadhramaut Tribal Alliance (HTA); Saudi Arabia; Result: PLC–Saudi victory; Southern Transitional Council dissolves itself on 9 January 2026 |
| Iran–Israel conflict | 2024 Iran–Israel conflict | Israeli airstrike on the Iranian consulate in Damascus; Iranian seizure of the MSC Aries; Operation True Promise I; April 2024 Israeli strikes on Iran; Assassination of Ismail Haniyeh; Operation True Promise II; Operation Days of Repentance | Date: 1 April – 26 October 2024 (Note: First phase: 1–19 April 2024 (18 days) Second phase: 31 July – 26 October 2024 (2 months and 26 days)) (6 months, 3 weeks and 4 days); Place: Iran; Iraq; Israel; Syria; West Bank; Lebanon; Jordan; Yemen; Red Sea; Mediterranean Sea; Strait of Hormuz; Attacking forces: Israel Supported by: United States United Kingdom France Intelligence: Saudi Arabia United Arab Emirates; Defending forces: Iran Supported by: Axis of Resistance: Syria; Houthis; Hezbollah; Islamic Resistance in Iraq; Badr Organization; True Promise Corps; Result: Prelude to the Twelve-Day War |
| Iran–Israel conflict | Twelve-Day War | List of attacks during the Twelve-Day War | Date: 13–24 June 2025 (12 days); Place: Iran, Israel and the West Bank (Note: Spillover countries include Iraq, Jordan, Kuwait, Qatar, Lebanon, Saudi Arabia, Syria, and Yemen.); Attacking forces: Israel United States (Note: Indirectly involved during the first nine days of the war, and became directly involved on the tenth day when it struck Iranian nuclear sites on 22 June (02:10–02:35 IRST).) Defensive only: France Iraq Jordan Saudi Arabia Qatar; Defending forces: Iran Houthis (Note: The Houthis joined Iran in launching rockets on Israel in retaliation for the 13 June strikes.); Result: Inconclusive; Ceasefire |
| Iran–Israel conflict | 2026 Iran war | List of attacks during the 2026 Iran war | Date: 28 February 2026 – present (6 months, 3 weeks and 6 days); Place: West Asia (Note: Primarily the Persian Gulf and the Levant, as well as Cyprus (Akrotiri and Dhekelia) and the South Caucasus) Indian Ocean (Note: Including Diego Garcia); Attacking forces: United States Israel Saudi Arabia (Note: According to Reuters, citing Western and Iranian officials, the Saudi Air Force launched numerous unpublicized "tit-for-tat" strikes on Iranian soil in late March 2026, in retaliation for Iranian attacks on Saudi Arabia. The New York Times, citing U.S. officials, corroborated reports of Saudi strikes on Iran. Reuters also reported that the Saudi Air Force struck Iran-backed Iraqi militias near the Iraqi–Saudi border around the time of the 7 April ceasefire.) United Arab Emirates (Note: According to The Wall Street Journal and Bloomberg, citing "people familiar with the matter", and The New York Times, citing current and former U.S. officials, the UAE discreetly carried out retaliatory attacks against Iran, including a strike on an oil refinery at Lavan Island on 8 April.) Kuwait (Note: According to The Wall Street Journal, Kuwait launched attacks on Iran-backed Iraqi militias from its own territory. Iraqi officials reported at least two rocket attacks from Kuwaiti territory in April; according to Reuters, it was unclear whether they were launched by the Kuwaiti Armed Forces or the U.S. military. On 1 May, Kuwait said its soldiers exchanged fire with six members of Iran's Islamic Revolutionary Guards Corps, and arrested four, during an Iranian raid on Bubiyan Island.) Bahrain (Note: According to The Wall Street Journal, Bahrain launched airstrikes inside Iran in July 2026.) Yemen (PLC) Coalition of Political Forces of Iranian Kurdistan People's Fighters Front Other parties: Azerbaijan (Note: See 2026 alleged Iranian strikes on Azerbaijan.) Egypt Iraq Kurdistan Region (Note: See 2026 Iranian strikes on the Kurdistan Region.) Jordan Lebanon (Note: Lebanon's position in the war is unclear; it has been attacked both by Israel and the Axis of Resistance. For more information see 2026 Lebanon war.) Oman Palestine Qatar Syria (Note: See Syria in the 2026 Iran war regarding shelling by Hezbollah and drone attacks by groups affiliated with the Islamic Resistance in Iraq.) Turkey (Note: See 2026 interceptions of Iranian missiles in Turkey.) (United Kingdom) Akrotiri and Dhekelia British Indian Ocean Territory (Note: There are disputed accounts on whether the British Indian Ocean Territory was attacked in March 2026; Iran denied attacking the Diego Garcia military base, and no evidence has been presented corroborating such an attack.); Defending forces: Iran Axis of Resistance; Hezbollah (Note: Since 2 March; for further information, see 2026 Lebanon war.); Houthis (Note: Since 28 March; for further information, see 2026 Houthi strikes on Israel.); Amal Movement (Note: The Amal Movement has played an active role in hostilities in Lebanon alongside Hezbollah. Paramedics belonging to the Amal Movement's Islamic Risala Scout Association have been targeted in Israeli airstrikes.); Popular Mobilization Forces (Note: For further information, see 2026 United States–Israeli strikes on Iraq.); Islamic Resistance in Iraq Other parties: Lebanon Iraq Islamic Group Hamas Palestinian Islamic Jihad |
| Israeli attack on Doha | | | Date: 9 September 2025; Place: Leqtaifiya, Doha, Qatar (25°21′26″N 51°30′35″E); Attacking power: Israel; Defending power: Qatar Hamas |
| Separatism in Iran | | Attacks: Iranian–Kurdish conflict; 2026 Kurdish–Iranian crisis; Western Iran clashes (2026–present); Insurgency in Sistan and Balochistan; 2024 Chabahar and Rask clashes; 2024 Gowhar Kuh attack; Sistan and Balochistan clashes (2026–present); Arab separatism in Khuzestan; 2025–2026 Iranian protests | Date: 7 October 2023 – present (2 years, 11 months, 2 weeks and 3 days); Place: Iran; Attacking forces: Coalition of Political Forces of Iranian Kurdistan; Democratic Party of Iranian Kurdistan; Kurdistan Free Life Party; Kurdistan Freedom Party; Organization of Iranian Kurdistan Struggle; Komala of the Toilers of Kurdistan; Komala Party of Iranian Kurdistan; (Kurdistan Region) Sun of Hope Jaysh al-Adl (until 2025) Ansar Al-Furqan People's Fighter's Front (Khuzestan Province) Ahwaz Falcons; Defending force: Iran |

== Protests ==
- (Palestine) Anti-Hamas protests
  - (Palestine) 2025 Gaza Strip anti-Hamas protests
  - (Palestine) (Hamas) June 26 Revolution
- (Palestine) Gaza Freedom Flotillas
  - (Turkey) 2024 Gaza Freedom Flotilla
  - (Malta) (Tunisia) May 2025 Gaza Freedom Flotilla
  - (Italy) June 2025 Gaza Freedom Flotilla
  - (Italy) July 2025 Gaza Freedom Flotilla
  - (United Nations) 2025 Global Sumud Flotilla
  - (United Nations) 2026 Global Sumud Flotilla
- (Pahlavi Iran) (Iran) 2025-2026 Iranian protests
- (Pahlavi Iran) (Iran) 2026 Iranian diaspora protests
- Gaza war protests
  - Gaza war protests in Israel
  - (Indonesia) 2023 Bitung clashes
  - Pro-Palestinian protests in Pakistan
    - (Pakistan) Hurmat-e-Masjid Aqsa Conference
    - (Pakistan) D-Chowk Dharna
    - (Pakistan) 2024 Faizabad sit-in
    - 2025 Tehreek-e-Labbaik Pakistan protests
  - (Bangladesh) March for Gaza
  - Gaza war protests in Albania
  - Gaza war protests in Austria
  - Gaza war protests in Belgium
  - Gaza war protests in Bosnia and Herzegovina
  - Gaza war protests in Denmark
  - Gaza war protests in Finland
  - Gaza war protests in France
    - (France) March for the Republic and Against Antisemitism
    - (France) 2024 Sciences Po pro-Palestinian occupation protest
  - Gaza war protests in Greece
  - (Republic of Ireland) Gaza war protests in Ireland
  - Gaza war protests in Italy
  - Gaza war protests in Netherlands
    - 2024 pro-Palestinian protests on university campuses in the Netherlands
      - (Netherlands) 2024 University of Amsterdam pro-Palestinian campus occupations
      - (Netherlands) 2024 Radboud University Nijmegen pro-Palestinian campus occupations
    - 2025 pro-Palestinian protests on university campuses in the Netherlands
    - (Netherlands) November 2024 Amsterdam riots
  - Gaza war protests in Portugal
  - (Russia) Gaza war protests in the North Caucasus
  - Gaza war protests in Slovenia
  - Gaza war protests in Spain
  - Gaza war protests in Sweden
  - Gaza war protests in Switzerland
  - Gaza war protests in the United Kingdom
    - (United Kingdom) University of Oxford pro-Palestinian campus occupations
  - Gaza war protests in Canada
    - (Canada) McGill University pro-Palestinian encampment
  - Gaza war protests in the United States
    - (United States) Resignation of officials due to Biden's support for Israel
    - Pro-Palestinian protests on university campuses in the United States in 2024
      - (United States) List of pro-Palestinian protests on university campuses in California in 2024
        - (United States) 2024 University of California, Davis pro-Palestinian campus occupation
        - (United States) 2024 University of Southern California pro-Palestinian campus occupation
        - (United States) 2024 University of California, Los Angeles pro-Palestinian campus occupation
        - (United States) 2024 University of California, Irvine pro-Palestinian campus occupation
      - (United States) Columbia University pro-Palestinian campus protests during the Gaza war
      - (United States) Gaza war protests at Ohio State University
      - (United States) 2024 University of Oregon pro-Palestinian campus occupation
      - (United States) 2024 Portland State University pro-Palestinian campus occupation
      - (United States) 2024 University of Pennsylvania pro-Palestine campus encampment
      - (United States) 2024 University of Texas at Austin pro-Palestinian campus protests
      - (United States) 2024 University of Virginia pro-Palestinian campus occupation
      - (United States) 2024 University of Washington pro-Palestinian campus occupation
  - Gaza war protests in Turkey
  - Gaza war protests in Australia
    - (Australia) 2025 Sydney Harbour Bridge protest
  - Gaza war protests in New Zealand
  - (Egypt) Global March to Gaza
  - Blockout 2024
  - Artists4Ceasefire
  - LGBTQ advocacy in the Gaza war
- Protests against the 2026 Iran war
  - (Pakistan) 2026 attack on the United States consulate in Karachi

== See also ==
- Middle Eastern crisis (2023–present)
- Middle Eastern crisis order of battle
