= 2024 Beqaa Valley airstrikes =

Israeli airstrikes on a dozen Lebanese villages

- Part of the 2024 Israeli invasion of Lebanon
- Map of the Beqaa Governorate within Lebanon
- Location: Beqaa Valley, Lebanon
- Date: 28 October 2024 – 6 November 2024
- Attack type: Airstrikes
- Deaths: 134+
- Injuries: 117+
- Perpetrator: Israel Defense Forces

On 28 October 2024, the Israel Defense Forces conducted a series of airstrikes on roughly a dozen settlements in the Beqaa Valley in Lebanon, killing at least 134 people and leaving at least 117 others injured. Follow-up airstrikes on two villages killed at least nineteen more on 30 October, with "dozens" more being killed on 2–3 November. The airstrikes were described by regional governor Bachie Khodr as the most intense in the area since the start of Israeli–Hezbollah escalations in September 2024.

== Background ==
The Beqaa Valley is located about 30 km (19 mi) east of Beirut. The valley is situated between Mount Lebanon to the west and the Anti-Lebanon Mountains to the east, and broadly corresponds to the Coele-Syria of classical antiquity. It is a fertile valley in eastern Lebanon and its most important farming region.

Due to wars and the unstable economic and political conditions Lebanon faced in the past, with difficulties some farmers still face today, many previous inhabitants of the valley left for coastal cities in Lebanon or emigrated from the country altogether.

Israel stated that the region was a Hezbollah stronghold. The Israeli Air Force targeted several institutions of the Al-Qard Al-Hasan Association, a Hezbollah-linked financial institution on the night of October 20–21, 2024, which included institutions in Beqaa Valley. One day prior to the attacks, Israeli airstrikes targeted the nearby city of Tyre, killing seven and injuring seventeen.

== Airstrikes ==
Throughout 28 October 2024, Israeli Air Force warplanes struck several villages across 16 areas in the valley. The Lebanese Ministry of Public Health reported that at least 60 people were killed by the airstrikes, with at least two being children. In addition, at least 58 more were wounded, with rescue efforts attempting to uncover victims and survivors among the rubble. The Baalbek Civil Defense crew leader Bilal Raad stated described the attacks as akin to a "ring of fire" that "suddenly surrounded the area", and reported that the attacks had targeted several quarters. He further indicated that a lack of rescue equipment significantly hindered rescue operations.

In Al-Allaq, sixteen Lebanese residents all from the same family were killed by one of the Israeli strikes. In Boudai, video footage recorded several residents begging for heavy machinery in order to be able to recover those still trapped in the collapsed buildings.

UNESCO reported that the attacks also targeted the vicinity of the ancient Roman Heliopolis World Heritage site, with preliminary satellite imaging not showing any significant damage.

On 30 October 2024, two villages were struck by Israeli airstrikes, killing nineteen people including eight women.

=== November ===
On 2–3 November, over two dozen settlements in Beqaa Valley were targeted by Israeli airstrikes, resulting in the deaths of "dozens" with several more left injured.

On 6 November, the Israeli Air Force carried out 33 air raids, killing 55 people and injuring 59 others.

== Reactions ==
=== Domestic ===
Baalbek Governor Bachie Khodr referred to the airstrikes as the "most violent" in the region since the start of escalations between Israel and Hezbollah about a month prior.

Several residents of the impacted areas, in addition to human rights groups, called the attacks "indiscriminate".

=== International ===
United States State Department spokesman Matthew Miller expressed support for Israel's actions in the Beqaa Valley.
