= Gaza war protests in New Zealand =

Protests relating to the Israel–Hamas war

- Part of the Gaza war protests
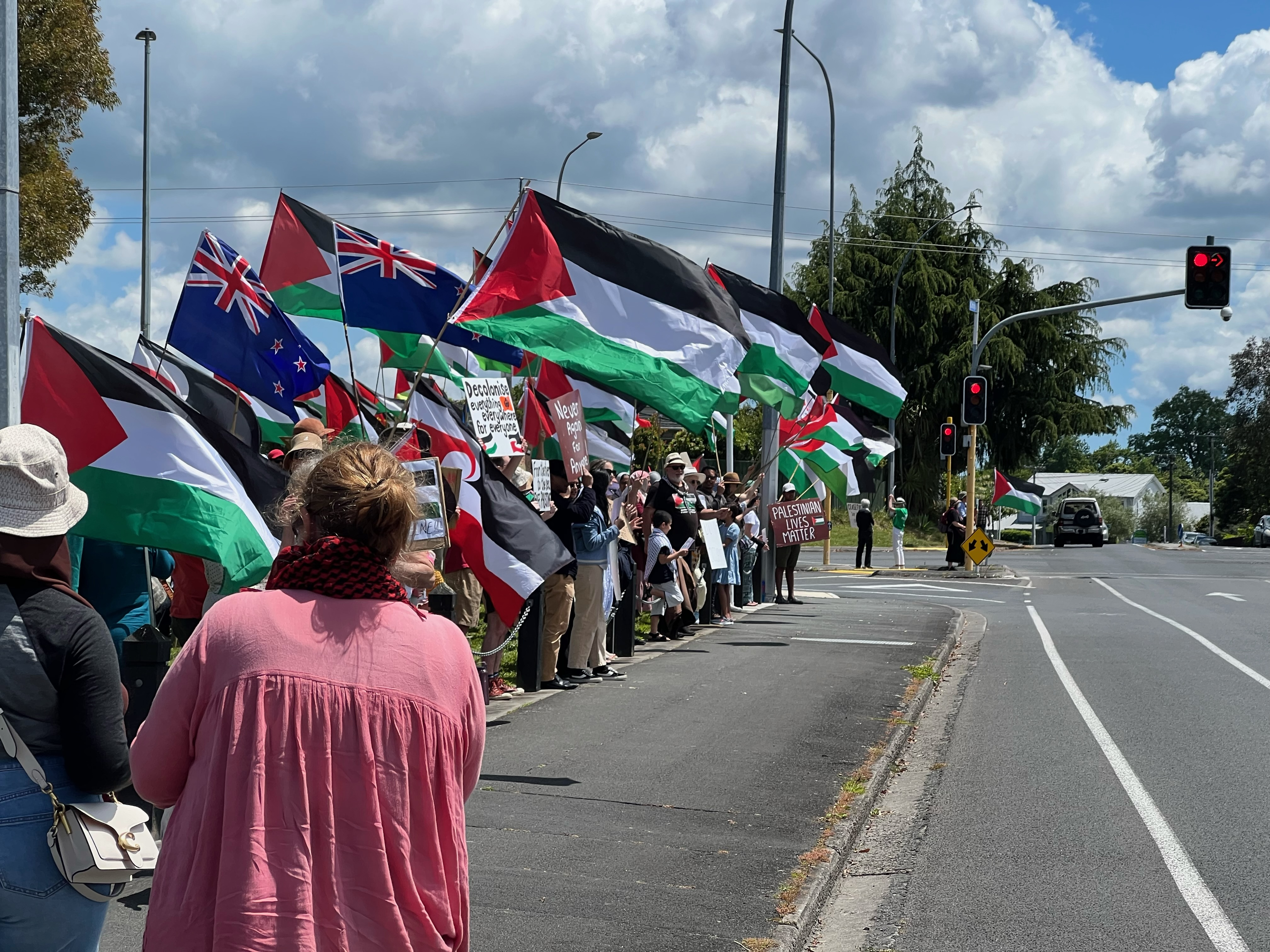
- Palestine vigils have been held every Saturday at Flynn Park, Hamilton
- Date: 15 October 2023 – present (3 years, 1 month and 5 days)
- Location: New Zealand
- Caused by: Gaza war
- Methods: demonstrations, counter-protests, sit-ins, occupations, picketing, civil disobedience, direct action, online activism

Since the outbreak of the Gaza war on 7 October 2023, both pro-Palestinian and pro-Israel protest events have been held across several New Zealand centres including Auckland, Wellington, Christchurch, Palmerston North, Nelson and Dunedin. Pro-Palestinian protesters including the Palestine Solidarity Network Aotearoa New Zealand's leader John Minto have called for a ceasefire in Gaza and the suspension of diplomatic, economic and institutional relations and linkages between New Zealand and Israel. Notable protest campaigns have included an attempted blockade of the Ports of Auckland, protest events at several university campuses in mid-2024 and a controversial hotline targeting Israeli visitors of military age in January 2025.

Pro-Israel figures such as Destiny Church leader Brian Tamaki have organised pro-Israel counter-protests have been held across New Zealand. These have sought to express support for Israeli actions and to counter alleged antisemitism.

== Timeline of events ==
=== 2023 ===
==== October ====
On 15 October, the Auckland War Memorial Museum staged a light display in the colours of the flag of Israel to express solidarity with Israel and civilians affected by the terrorist attacks. In response, about 100 Palestinian supporters gathered outside the museum and covered the lights with jackets and flags. They had a verbal altercation with a group of pro-Israel supporters. Local pro-Palestinian advocates including Alternative Jewish Voices co-founder Marilyn Garson, Janfrie Wakim, and Palestine Solidarity Network Aotearoa (PSNA) leader John Minto criticised the museum's light display as partisan and "insensitive" to Palestinians. Museum chief executive David Reeves subsequently issued a statement apologizing "for the distress and hurt caused to members of our community". Reeve's apology was criticised by New Zealand Jewish Council spokesperson Juliet Moses, who described the protest as "extremely disappointing" and the museum's apology as a betrayal.

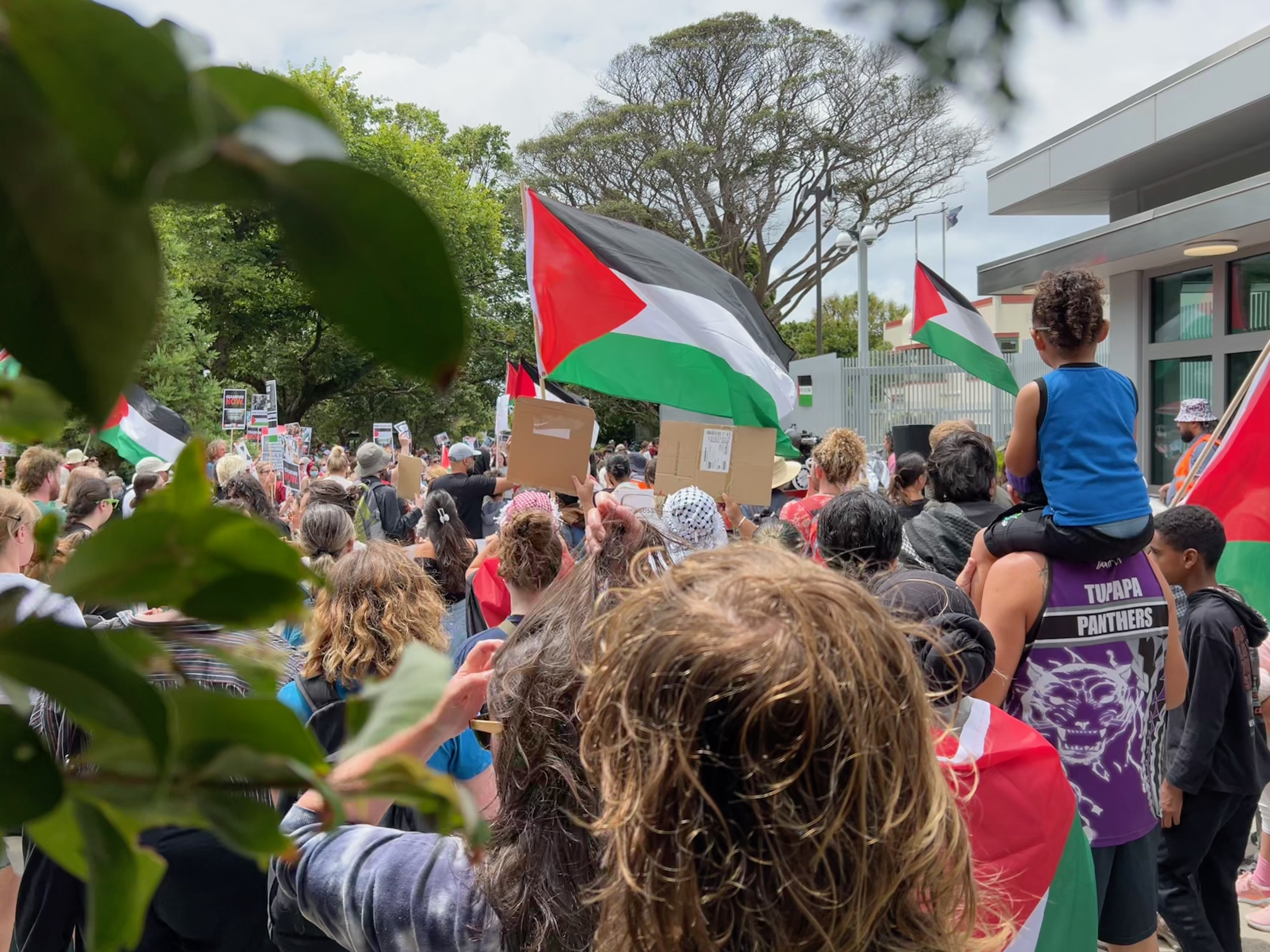
Palestine protest march from the US Embassy, Wellington in 2024

In Auckland, hundreds of protesters gathered in Aotea Square on 21 October, with protesters waving a flag of Palestine as well as holding placards saying "Ceasefire", and "Free Palestine". In addition, thousands also attended similar rallies in other urban centres including Hamilton, Christchurch, Whanganui, New Plymouth, Wellington and Palmerston North.

On 28 October, thousands of protesters attended Palestine solidarity rallies in Auckland, Hamilton, Napier, Palmerston North, Whanganui, Nelson, Christchurch and Dunedin. These rallies called for an immediate ceasefire to the Hamas-Israel conflict and the entry of humanitarian aid to Gaza.

On 29 October, pro-Israel protesters staged rallies across New Zealand. In Auckland's Aotea Square, a large crowd called for the release of Israeli hostages in Gaza.

==== November ====
On 7 November, about 100 Palestinian solidarity protesters gathered outside the Auckland War Memorial Museum. They covered the museum lights with red and green cellophane and illuminated the building in the colours of the Palestine flag.

On 11 November, about 300 Palestinian solidarity protesters marched from Dunedin's Museum Reserve to the Octagon. Several protesters also carried Palestinian and Tino Rangatiratanga flags. The march was attended by PSNA spokesperson Rinad Tamimi, University of Otago lecturer Dr Oliver Jutel, and former Mayor of Dunedin Aaron Hawkins.

On 12 November, Palestinian solidarity protesters gathered in Auckland's Aotea Square to reiterate calls for a humanitarian ceasefire in Gaza. PSNA chair Minto called on outgoing Prime Minister Chris Hipkins and incoming Prime Minister Christopher Luxon to support international calls for a ceasefire. Police arrested three people including a man who allegedly assaulted a child aged between five and six years following the Aotea Square rally.

On 14 November, members of the Palestinian solidarity group "Tāmaki for Palestine" splashed red paint on the Auckland office of the Ministry of Foreign Affairs and Trade (MFAT) and the United States Consulate-General in Auckland to protest the deaths of Palestinian civilians. Police subsequently arrested one person in relation to the vandalism. On 22 November, "Tāmaki for Palestine" splashed red paint on the offices of seven Auckland-based National and ACT politicians including Prime Minister-designate Christopher Luxon and ACT leader David Seymour for refusing to call for a ceasefire in Gaza or condemn Israel's actions.

On 23 November, pro-Palestinian protesters blockaded the Ports of Auckland in an attempt to disrupt the transportation of Israeli goods. These protesters also called for a ceasefire in Gaza and for a boycott of trade with Israel. Police arrested six protesters for disrupting port operations.

On 25 November, police arrested a counter-demonstrator, Lucy Rogers, for attempting to allegedly "antagonise" pro-Palestinian protesters in Auckland. Rogers was a criminal defence lawyer who had held a placard stating "Selective condemnation of genocide is evil" and accused police of using breach of the peace laws to silence legitimate speech.

==== December ====
On 5 December, hundreds of pro-Palestinian protesters gathered outside the New Zealand Parliament to urge Foreign Minister Winston Peters to demand an immediate and permanent ceasefire in Gaza. The protest was organised by Justice for Palestine and Alternative Jewish Voices and coincided with the opening of Parliament and the National Māori Action Day protest. In addition, the Labour, Green and Māori parties called for a ceasefire.

On 7 December, Destiny Church leader Brian Tamaki staged a 400-strong pro-Israel rally on the grounds of the NZ Parliament. Tamaki's rally opposed calls for a ceasefire and submitted a petition to ACT MP Simon Court calling for Hamas and Hezbollah to be classified as a terror organizations and for Members of Parliament supporting them to be expelled. In response, members of the Poneke Anti-Fascist Coalition staged a counter-protest outside the Supreme Court of New Zealand in Lambton Quay.

On 22 December, a pro-Palestinian activist dressed as Santa Claus poured red paint in the lift lobby of the building housing the Israeli Embassy in Wellington.

=== 2024 ===
==== January ====
In Nelson, members of the Palestinian community staged weekly protests on Saturdays over a three-month period. On 11 January, a man assaulted pro-Palestinian protester Kerry Sorensen-Tyrer in the Auckland suburb of Remuera, striking her on the face with a pole. On 12 January, Police arrested the man on charges of "causing injury with reckless disregard".

In late January 2024, members of foreign affairs activist group Te Kūaka, the PSNA and Palestinian Youth Aotearoa (PYA) marched outside the Devonport Naval Base in Auckland to protest against New Zealand's support for the Anglo-American 2024 Yemen airstrikes against Houthi targets and to urge the New Zealand Government to call for a humanitarian ceasefire in Gaza.

==== February ====
On 6 February 2024, 60 Palestinian solidarity protesters blocked traffic outside the Lyttelton port, calling upon the Government to call for a ceasefire in Gaza and to criticise Israeli actions. They also blocked a tunnel and poured a liquid on the road. Police arrested seven people for obstructing traffic. Palestine Solidarity Network secretary Neil Scott criticised the Police for their alleged heavy-handed treatment of protesters and called for an investigation into the Police response.

On 18 February, Palestinian solidarity and transgender rights protesters confronted Prime Minister Luxon during the annual Big Gay Out festival in the Auckland suburb of Point Chevalier, prompting him to withdraw.

==== March–May ====
On 15 March, 20 Palestinian solidarity protesters picketed MFAT's Auckland office, demanding an end to hostilities and calling upon the New Zealand Government to grant special humanitarian visas to Palestinian war victims.

On 1 May 2024, members of the University of Auckland's Students for Justice in Palestine chapter staged a protest on university grounds in solidarity with the 2024 pro-Palestinian protests on university campuses. On 4 May, about 30 protesters including Minto staged a flash mob protest outside Foreign Minister Winston Peters' residence demanding that New Zealand reinstate funding for UNRWA and severe diplomatic relations with Israel. On 7 May, the Whanganui District Council including Mayor Andrew Tripe voted to call for a permanent ceasefire in Gaza and condemned "all acts of violence and terror against civilians on all sides."

On 12 May, 1,000 protesters marched in the Auckland CBD to commemorate Nakba Day. On 16 May, several groups including Alternative Jewish Voices, Student Justice for Palestine Pōneke, Peace Action Wellington, and Pōneke Anti-Fascist Coalition protested outside the Wellington Club, which was hosting an event to celebrate the establishment of Israel. Broadcaster and The Platform founder Sean Plunket accused the protesters of intimidatory behaviour and assault.

On 20 May, former Shortland Street TV series actor Will Alexander announced that he would go on a hunger strike to protest the New Zealand Government's alleged support for Israel's alleged genocide against Palestinians in Gaza. On 21 May, 60 students and non-student protesters camped on the University of Canterbury's premises in Christchurch to demand that the university divest from Israel.

On 23 May, students and staff protested in solidarity with Palestine at several universities including the University of Canterbury, University of Auckland, University of Waikato, Victoria University of Wellington, University of Otago and Massey University. On 29 May, the Dunedin City Council passed a motion urging the New Zealand government to create special visas for Palestinian refugees by a margin of 14 to one votes.

==== June ====
On 27 June 2024, hundreds attended the "All Out for Gaza National Rally" in Wellington, which was organised by spokesperson Yasser Abdul Al. The rally called upon the New Zealand government to condemn and impose sanctions on Israel, recognise Palestinian statehood, grant emergency visas to the families of Palestinian New Zealanders in Gaza, and boost funding to the UNRWA. Green Party co-leader Chlöe Swarbrick attended the rally.

==== September–December ====
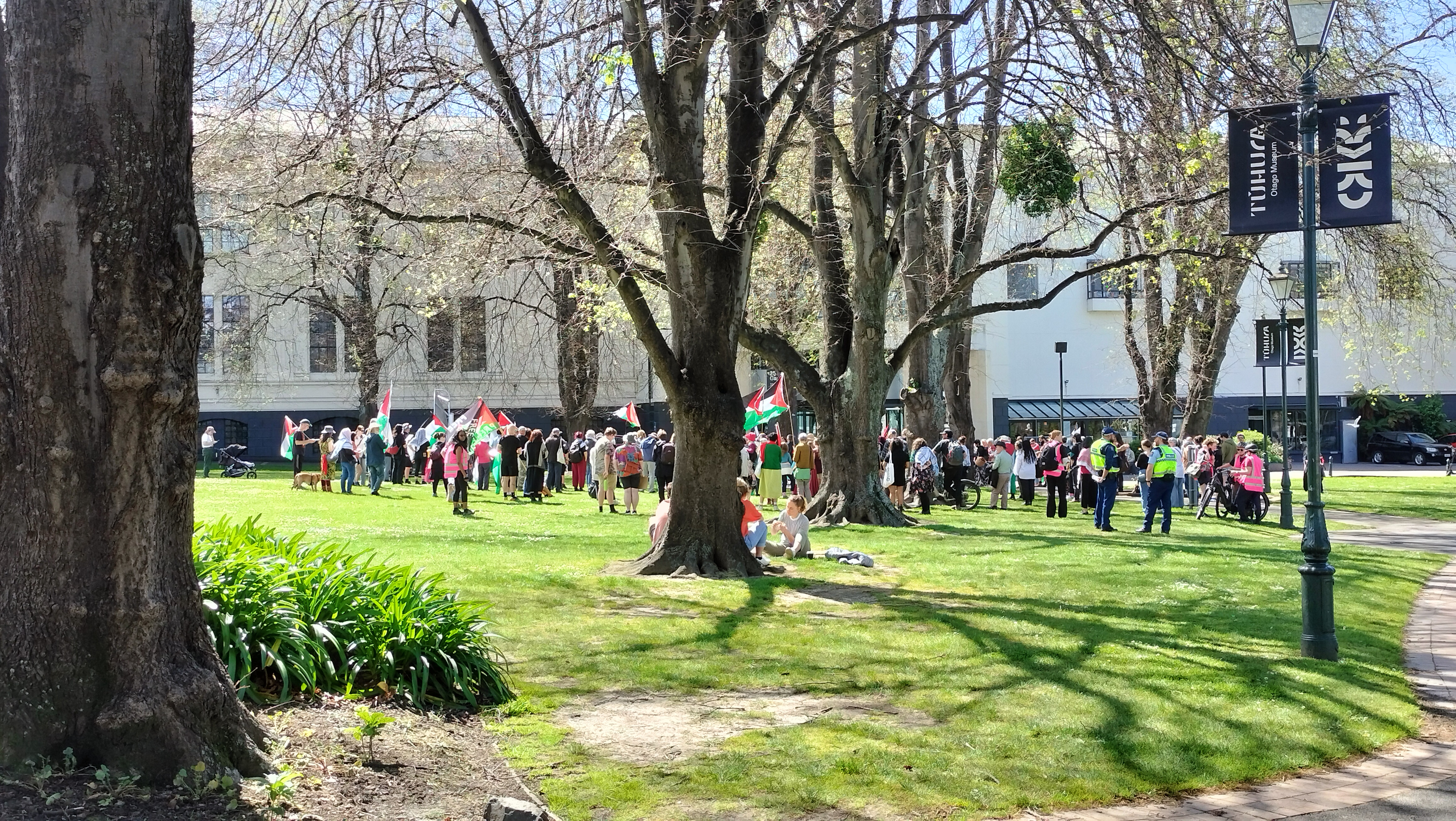
Palestinian solidarity protesters gathering outside the Otago Museum in Dunedin

On 26 September, 100 people protested outside the Israeli Embassy in Wellington in response to an escalation in the Israel-Hezbollah conflict in Lebanon.

On 7 October, Destiny Church and pro-Palestinian solidarity protesters staged competing protests outside public broadcaster TVNZ's headquarters to mark the anniversary of the Hamas attack on Gaza. On 9 October, 200 Palestinian solidarity protesters including students and faculty called on the University of Otago to condemn the "Gaza Genocide" and suspend collaborations with Israeli universities and corporations. The protest led to the suspension of a talk by Vice-Chancellor Grant Robertson. A student was arrested following an altercation with a campus security guard near the Clocktower complex. On 13 October, Palestinian solidarity protesters picketed the New Zealand First party's annual conference in Hamilton. Eight protesters disrupted party leader Winston Peters' speech before being removed by the organisers. Two were also arrested by police for allegedly pushing NZ First MP Shane Jones.

On 11 December, pro-Palestinian and pro-Israel protesters held competing marches on the New Zealand Parliament's lawn. The Palestinian Solidarity Network Aotearoa had organised an "Aotearoa National Rally for Gaza" in Wellington and delivered a petition to MPs from the Labour, Green and Māori parties. The pro-Israel rally included several members of Destiny Church and was supported by church leader Tamaki, ACT MP Simon Court and former National MP Alfred Ngaro.

=== 2025 ===
==== January–March ====
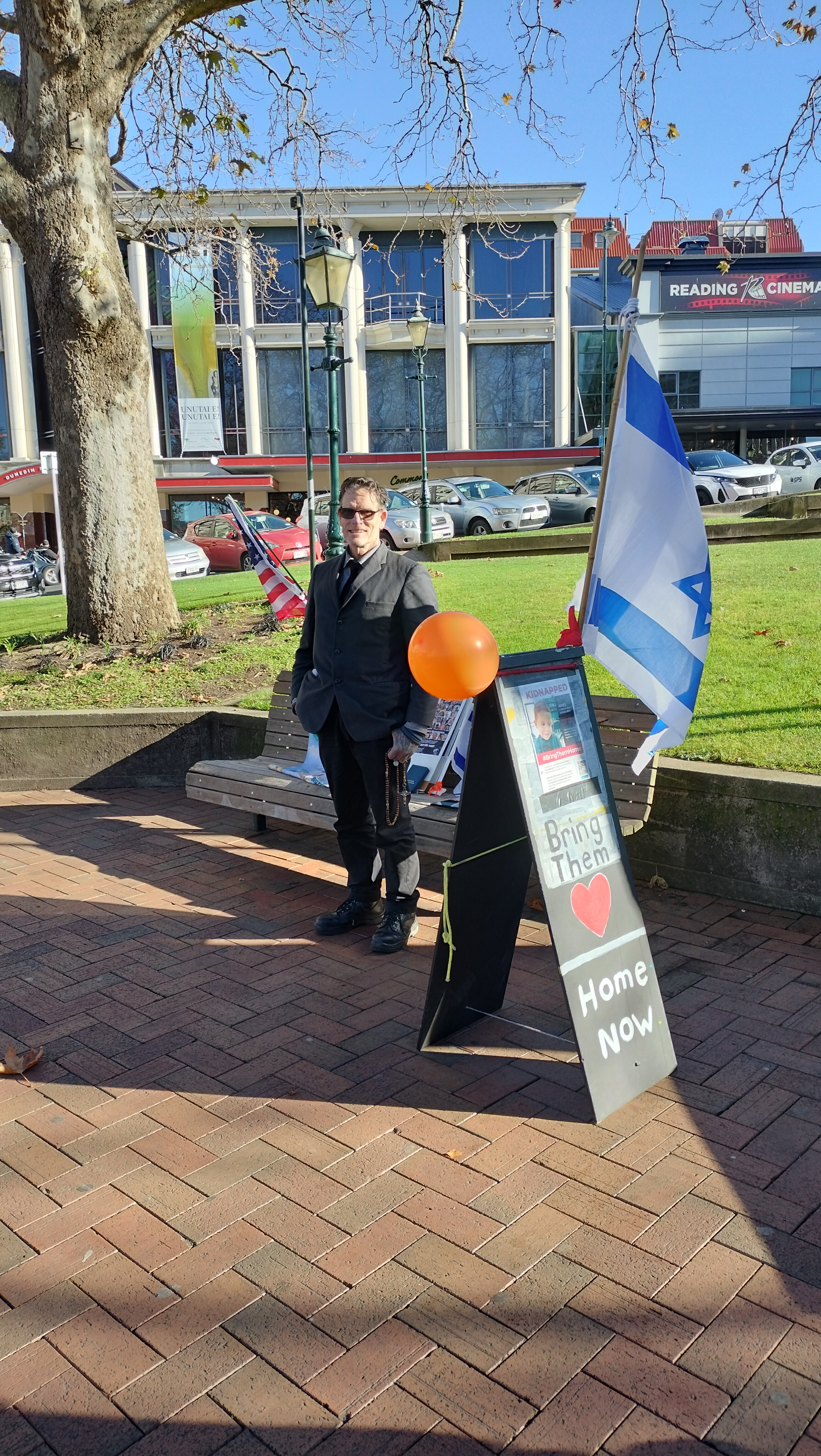
Pro-Israel protester in Dunedin's The Octagon in May 2025

In late January, the PSNA's chair John Minto attracted media attention and controversy after his organisation established a hotline for New Zealanders to report Israeli citizens of military age who were holidaying in New Zealand in response to the Israel-Hamas war. New Zealand Jewish Council spokesperson Julie Moses described the hotline as an "incitement to violence" and "vigilante justice" while Holocaust Centre New Zealand spokesperson Deb Hart said it would endanger the New Zealand Jewish community. Chief Human Rights Commissioner Stephen Rainbow described the hotline as "potentially harmful" to Israeli and Jewish people in New Zealand while Race Relations Commissioner Melissa Derby called on New Zealanders to support social cohesion. Similar criticism was echoed by Foreign Minister Winston Peters and ACT MP Simon Court, who said the hotline would promote totalitarianism and intimidatory behaviour against Israeli and Jews. In response to criticism, Minto denied that the hotline campaign was antisemitic but said that it was meant to "send the message to Israeli soldiers that New Zealand society does not support their actions." By 29 January, the Human Rights Commission had received about 100 complaints about a PSNA digital flyer promoting the hotline campaign.

On 15 February, 20 pro-Palestinian protesters led by Sam Bosshard picketed a Christian Zionist seminar being held at Cornerstone International Bible Church in Dunedin's Filleul Street. The speakers Perry and Sheree Trotter focused on challenging criticism of Israel and so-called Replacement theology. Bosshard also worked with church member Sam Mangai to ensure there were no issues between the two groups.

At the University of Otago Orientation Week at the end of February, the Otago University Students' Association (OUSA) refused to allow Domino's Pizza a spot at the "Ten City" event. The OUSA had informally adopted a Boycott, Divestment, and Sanctions position, and Domino's had a perceived pro-Israel stance. A Domino's van which arrived to give out free pizza was asked to leave. Two formal complaints from students led to the OUSA taking its BDS policy to the student body for consultation and feedback.

On 4 March, 40 pro-Palestinian protesters held a lunchtime gathering in Dunedin's Octagon to protest against a complaint by the pro-Israel advocacy group Israel Institute of New Zealand (IINZ) against a local bus safety campaign featuring a 15-year-old girl wearing a keffiyeh. Police arrested a 23-year-old man for assaulting two protesters and stomping on one of them. IINZ spokesperson David Cumin condemned the assault as appalling. The Otago Regional Council, along with the Dunedin Youth Council and the Dunedin Student Council, had launched a bus safety campaign in January 2025 following the killing of local teenager Enere McLaren-Taana in May 2024. The Council briefly suspended the campaign in early March after the Israel Institute had complained about a teenager wearing a keffiyeh in a campaign poster.

On 22 March, Cambridge for Palestine, an affiliate of the Palestine Solidarity Network Aotearoa, held a protest in Cambridge. Lawyer and pro-Israel supporter Paul Fisher was filmed verbally accosting pro-Palestinian protesters. Former The New Zealand Herald columnist and law student Shaneel Lal and Palestine Waikato member Angela Sylvia announced that they would file complaints about Fisher's behaviour with the New Zealand Law Society.

On 23 March, pro-Palestinian and pro-Israel protesters along with both pro and anti-greyhound racing protesters picketed NZ First leader and Deputy Prime Minister Winston Peters' state of the nation address at the James Hay Theatre in Christchurch. Police monitored the protests and arrested ten individuals for disrupting Peters' speech.

==== April–July ====
On 16 May, pro-Palestinian protesters joined transgender rights, pay equity and climate change protesters in picketing the reopening ceremony of Hillside Engineering in South Dunedin. The ceremony was attend by Deputy Prime Minister Peters, Regional Development Minister Shane Jones, and Labour MP Ingrid Leary.

On 3 July, the activist group Palestine Solidarity Network Aotearoa's (PSNA) co-chairs John Minto and Maher Nazzal had referred six New Zealand political and business figures to the Prosecutor of the International Criminal Court, alleging complicity in Israel's alleged war crimes during the Gaza war. These six individuals were Prime Minister Christopher Luxon, Foreign Affairs Minister Winston Peters, Defence and Space Minister Judith Collins, Deputy Prime Minister David Seymour, Rocket Lab chief executive Sir Peter Beck and Rakon Limited chief executive Dr Sinan Altug. The PSNA alleged that Rocket Lab launched spy satellites from Māhia that were used by Israel to target Palestinians while Rakon exported military-grade crystal oscillators to American defense contractors who supplied missiles to Israel for use in Gaza. On 4 July, the PSNA staged protests against Rocket Lab's alleged complicity in the alleged Gaza genocide outside the company's head office in Mount Wellington, factory at Warkworth and satellites launch site at the Mahia peninsula.

On 19 July, 300 Palestine solidarity supporters and protesters marched from the Auckland CBD to the Viaduct Harbour to meet the Greenpeace environmental vessel Rainbow Warrior. Greenpeace Aotearoa New Zealand oceans campaigner Juan Parada gave a speech at Halsey Wharf reiterating Greenpeace's support for Palestinian rights.

==== August–September ====
In early August, the Otago University Students' Association Executive's abandoned its Boycott, Divestment and Sanctions policy, citing a lack of information. The OUSA Executive decision was criticised by Green MP Francisco Hernandez and several campus-based Palestinian solidarity groups including Otago Staff for Palestine (OSP), Otago Students for Justice in Palestine (OSJP) and the local chapter of the Muslim Students' Association (MSA). On 21 August 2025, the OUSA voted by a large majority to reinstate its BDS policy. OUSA financial officer Daniel Leamy expressed concern about the financial impact of boycott action on the OUSA's budget while former Mayor of Dunedin Aaron Hawkins and representatives of the Greens and OSJP supported the motion.

On 16 August, several Palestinian solidarity protests calling for an end to the Gaza war and sanctions against Israel were held in 20 cities and towns.

On 7 September 2025, a small group of Palestinian solidarity protesters joined pro-greyhound racing protesters in picketing the New Zealand First party's annual conference in Palmerston North. Foreign Minister Winston Peters, the target of the two groups, spoke at that conference.

On 13 September, about 20,000 pro-Palestinian protesters held a "March for Humanity" in Central Auckland calling for the New Zealand Government to sanction Israel over its conduct during the Gaza war. 50 pro-Israel counter-demonstrators also staged a counter-protest and performed a haka (ka mate). Organisers for the March for Humanity had originally planned to march across the Auckland Harbour Bridge but changed their route to Aotea Square and Victoria Park due to adverse weather conditions.

On 15 September, six Christian clergy including Anglican priest Christopher Kirby and Anglican archdeacon Mel McKenzie chained themselves to Finance Minister Nicola Willis' electorate office in Wellington. They demanded a meeting with Willis and called upon the New Zealand Government to sanction Israel and recognise Palestinian statehood. Five other activists tried to stage a similar protest at National MP Simeon Brown's Auckland electorate office but were trespassed. Police in Wellington also prevented a third group from picketing another Wellington electorate office. In response, the pro-Israel "Coalition of Ministers Supporting Israel in New Zealand" said that the Gaza conflict was complexed and opposed calls to recognise Palestinian statehood. Willis declined to meet with the six clergy and accused them of intimidating her staff and constituents. On 16 September, the priests ended their protest after 32 hours.

==== October– December ====
On 2 October, 30 pro-Palestine protesters gathered outside Foreign Minister Winston Peter's house in Auckland to express support for the Global Sumud Flotilla, which included three New Zealand participants. On 3 October, a crowd of pro-Palestinian protesters gathered outside the port facilities at Port Chalmers during Peters and Resources Management Minister Shane Jones's visit to mark the opening of Port Otago's new rail siding. The protesters condemned Peters' decision as Foreign Minister not to recognise Palestinian statehood and accused him of complicity in the alleged Gaza genocide. On 6 October, a 29-year-old man damaged a window at Peter's home with a crowbar. The following day, the man turned himself in to the police, who charged him with burglary. The attack on Peters' home was condemned by Prime Minister Luxon, Labour leader Chris Hipkins and Green Party co-leader Chlöe Swarbrick. In response, Peters accused Swarbrick of inciting violence and vandalism through her criticism of the Government's policies towards Israel-Palestine. On 7 October, telecommunications company One NZ terminated the contract of an actor who had shared Peters' street address online.

On 8 October, over 100 pro-Palestinian protesters affiliated with Peace Action Ōtautahi attempted to disrupt the New Zealand Aerospace Summit 2025 at Christchurch's Te Pae Convention Centre. The group was protesting the New Zealand aerospace industry's relationship with the United States Armed Forces, the Israel Defense Forces and international weapons companies. Activists chained themselves to doorways in an attempt to prevent the conference from taking place. In response, Police arrested 22 protesters.

On 30 October, about 12 pro-Palestinian protesters forced their way into the Oamaru electorate office of the Member of Parliament for Waitaki Miles Anderson. One of the protesters allegedly shoved and grabbed a female office worker by the arm. In response, Police were dispatched to Anderson's office at about 10:15 am and removed the protesters. They also arrested a Dunedin woman for alleged assault. The Oamaru protests was one of nine nationwide protests organised by a group called "Aotearoa for Sanctions," which has lobbied MPs into supporting legislation sanctioning Israel and advocated severing diplomatic relations with Israel.

On 25 November, several members of the Palestine Solidarity Network Aotearoa staged an impromptu protest at the Auckland Council's chambers after Mayor of Auckland Wayne Brown declined to allow the group the opportunity to speak at a governing council meeting. The Network had sought permission to fly the Palestinian flag on 29 November, which marked the "International Day of Solidarity with the Palestinian People." In response to the group's chants condemning him and calling for a "Free Palestine," Brown said "Free beer."

On 9 December, several pro-Palestinian protesters staged a protest in the New Zealand Parliament's public gallery, disrupting parliamentary proceedings. They chanted and circulated flyers denouncing the alleged Gaza genocide, calling for the expulsion of the Israeli Ambassador and the severing of diplomatic relations with Israel. Security guards removed the protesters within two minutes. On 10 December, Speaker of the House Gerry Brownlee responded to the protest by closing the chamber's gallery to members of the public for the duration of the year.
