= List of Palestinian rocket attacks on Israel in 2023 =

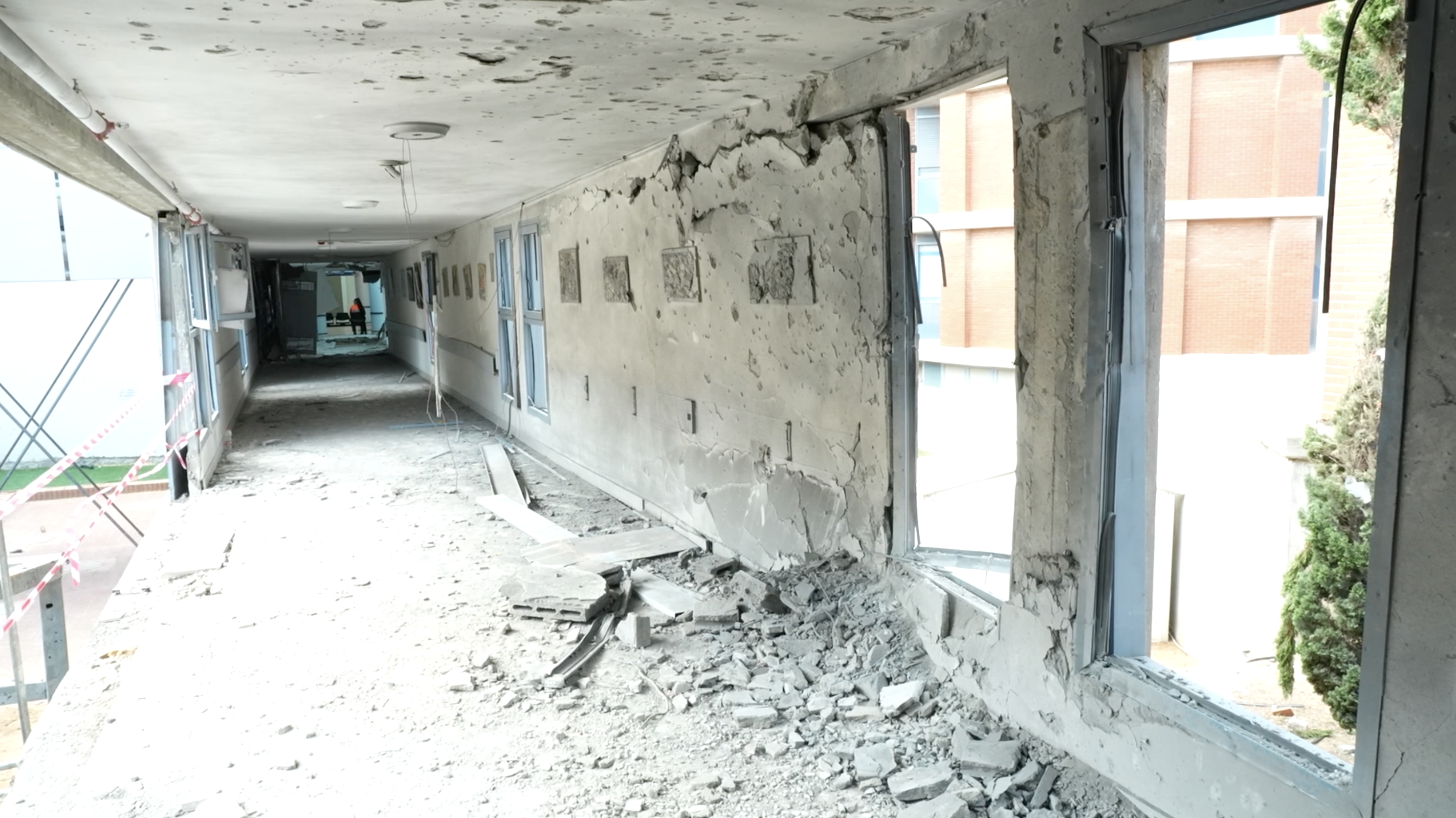
The aftermath of a Hamas rocket hit the maternity ward of Barzilai Medical Center, a hospital in southern Israel, on October 8, 2023

The following is a list of Palestinian rocket attacks on Israel in 2023.

== April ==
- April 5, attack of 18 launches from Gaza was initiated toward Israel. Two people were injured, and a factory in Sderot was damaged.
- April 6, during the Jewish Passover holiday, 7 rockets were fired from Gaza.
- April 7, 44 rockets were fired from Gaza. House in Sderot was damaged.

In total, 1,500,000 people in Israel were affected by these attacks.

== May ==
- May 2, 2023, Israel faced a series of attacks from the Gaza Strip, resulting in 8 injured, damage to buildings and cars, and fires. In total, 104 rockets were fired at Israel, and 500,000 Israelis were affected by the attack.
- May 9–13, 2023: 1,469 rockets and mortar shells fired at Israel, primarily the Palestinian Islamic Jihad. 131 landed in Israeli territory, 291 landed in the Gaza Strip, and 39 fell into the sea. Two people were killed in Israel and several dozen were wounded; extensive property damage was reported. 1,500,000 Israelis were affected by the attacks.
- May 14, 2023: 1 rocket fired at Israel. The Palestinian Islamic Jihad claimed it was a technical malfunction.

== October ==
- October 7–31, 2023: 8,500 rockets and mortar shells launched at Israel. About 10% of them were failed launches that landed in the Gaza Strip and in the sea.
- The 7 October rocket attacks included a strike on a putative nuclear missile site. The rocket hit land near the Sdot Micha Airbase.
- October 8: Rockets from Gaza were fired at the Israeli city of Ashkelon, and intercepted with the Iron Dome system.

== November ==
- November 1–7, 2023: 500 rockets and mortar shells launched at Israel, amounting to more than 9,000 since the beginning of October, and keeping a 10% rate of failed launches that fell inside the Gaza Strip and in the sea.
- November 8–12, 2023: Additional 500 rockets and mortar shells launched at Israel, amounting to more than 9,500 since the beginning of October, with the rate of failed launches that fell in the Gaza Strip and the sea rising to 12%.
- November 13–22, 2023: Additional 1000 rockets and mortar shells launched at Israel, amounting to more than 10,500 since the beginning of October, with the rate of failed launches that fell in the Gaza Strip and the sea back to 10%.

== See also ==
- Gaza war
- Red Sea crisis
- Timeline of the Israeli–Palestinian conflict in 2023
- List of Palestinian rocket attacks on Israel in 2024
