= 2026 Iranian strike on Diego Garcia =

Action of the 2026 Iran War

- Part of the 2026 Iran war
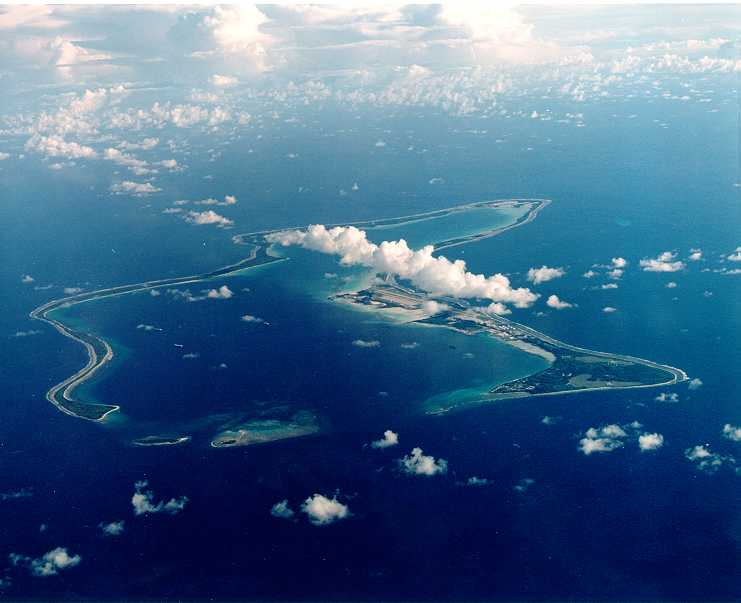
- Aerial view of Diego Garcia
Date	20 March 2026
Location	Diego Garcia, British Indian Ocean Territory
Result	No confirmed impacts; demonstrated range of Iranian missiles

Belligerents
Iran (denied by Iran)	United States; United Kingdom

Casualties and losses
2 intercontinental ballistic missiles (one failed in flight; one intercepted)	Unknown

On 20 March 2026, Iran launched at least two Khorramshahr-4 intercontinental ballistic missiles toward the island of Diego Garcia, British Indian Ocean Territory. Neither missile struck the intended target.

According to Pentagon sources cited by The Wall Street Journal, one missile failed during flight, while a SM-3 interceptor launched from a United States warship successfully intercepted the second. Israel also claimed that the strikes occurred, and added that such weapons had the capability of targeting Europe as well. Iran denied that it attacked Diego Garcia, calling it a false flag attack.

In response, the UK Foreign Secretary denounced the attack and expanded permission for the United States to bomb certain targets using British bases.

== Background ==
The United States maintains a strategic military base on Diego Garcia called Camp Justice. It was established in the 1970s and has equipment such as bombers and guided missile destroyers. It is an important island for American military presence in the Indo-Pacific region, alongside Guam.

The island has a 3,600-meter runway to facilitate the use of bombers such as the B-52H Stratfortress, B-1B Lancer, and B-2 Spirit , as well as transport aircraft like the C-17A Globemaster III, C-130J Super Hercules and C-27J Spartan. The facility also includes a port capable of accommodating up to 30 warships.

== Geography ==
Diego Garcia is located in the Chagos Archipelago in the Indian Ocean. It is mostly isolated from other countries and access to the island is restricted. The United States has renewed its lease of the base through at least 2030.
