= 2024 University of California, Davis pro-Palestinian campus occupation =

Protest at the University of California, Davis

2024 UC Davis pro-Palestinian campus occupation
- Part of Gaza war protests (in the US at universities (in 2024 (in the US (in California))))
- Date: May 6, 2024 – June 20, 2024 (1 month and 14 days)
- Location: Davis, California, United States

The UC Davis pro-Palestinian campus occupation was established by the Davis Popular University for the Liberation of Palestine (UCD PULP) as part of a nationwide campus activism movement advocating for Palestinian rights and calling for university divestment from Israeli investments due to the ongoing conflicts in Gaza.

== Background ==
This movement is part of a wider surge in campus activism across the United States, with similar protests occurring at institutions like Columbia University and UCLA. At Columbia, police action to clear an encampment led to a significant confrontation, highlighting tensions between protesters and authorities. UCLA also experienced violent clashes, as law enforcement intervened in demonstrations, reflecting the charged atmosphere around these protests. These events underscore a national dialogue on human rights and university investment policies, where students are pushing for changes to what they see as complicit financial activities by their institutions.

== Events ==
On the morning of May 6, 2024, students from the Davis Popular University for the Liberation of Palestine (UCD PULP) began setting up tents at the Memorial Quad near the Memorial Union of UC Davis. The encampment quickly grew in size, drawing attention and participation from various student groups and community members. During the night, there were incidents involving non-university affiliated agitators attempting to disrupt the peaceful protest. This event underscores the tensions surrounding the encampment as it continues to be a focal point for advocacy and conflict. During the early morning of June 20, 2024, members of PULP voluntarily removed their encampment and materials.

== Demands ==
The protesters have articulated a range of demands aimed at addressing what they see as complicity in genocide and settler-colonialism by UC Davis and broader institutional networks. These demands include Chancellor Gary May's resignation from Leidos, ending the Koret program, divesting from companies that profit from Israeli policies, providing robust support for Palestinian students, and establishing comprehensive academic initiatives focused on Arab American and SWANA (Southwest Asian and North African) studies. They advocate for a transformative approach to how the university addresses issues of racism, colonialism, and global conflicts, emphasizing solidarity with Palestinian liberation efforts and broader anti-racist and anti-colonial principles.

== Responses ==
On May 6, Chancellor Gary S. May issued a statement emphasizing UC Davis's commitment to a safe and peaceful campus environment that respects the community's right to free expression while maintaining educational and research missions without disruption. The university is actively engaging with students to mitigate any disruption and remains in contact with participants about their rights and responsibilities under the law and university policies. Chancellor May reaffirmed that as a public university, UC Davis supports peaceful protests and is committed to safety for all.

== Lawsuit ==
On May 17, 2024, Jonathan Groveman, a counterprotestor and a member of the Oct. 7 Coalition, sued the university, naming Chancellor Gary S. May and President of the University of California Michael V. Drake as defendants, for allowing the encampments to block his access to certain parts of the campus.
