= 2026 Iranian strike on Azerbaijan =

- Part of the 2026 Iran war
- 2026 Iranian strike on Azerbaijan (Azerbaijan)
- Location: Nakhchivan Autonomous Republic, Azerbaijan
- Date: 5 March 2026
- Attack type: Drone strike
- Weapon: One-way attack drone
- Injuries: 4
- Perpetrator: Iran

On 5 March 2026, two one-way attack drones struck the Azerbaijani exclave of Nakhchivan, during the 2026 Iran war. Azerbaijan blamed the attack on Iran, and vowed a response. Iranian officials promised a full investigation into the incident, with both sides favoring a diplomatic solution to prevent further escalation.

== Strikes ==
=== 5 March ===
The drones crashed into Nakhchivan International Airport in Azerbaijan's Nakhchivan exclave. Azerbaijan’s Ministry of Defense stated that four Iranian drones attacked Nakhchivan, one of which was neutralized by the Azerbaijani army while others targeted civilian infrastructure. One drone fell on the terminal building of Nakhchivan International Airport, while another landed near a school building in the village of Shakarabad, according to the Ministry of Foreign Affairs of Azerbaijan, resulting in damage to the airport and injuries to four civilians. Azerbaijan summoned the Iranian ambassador and promised a military response.

The General Staff of the Armed Forces of the Islamic Republic of Iran stated it had no involvement in the strike.

== Aftermath ==
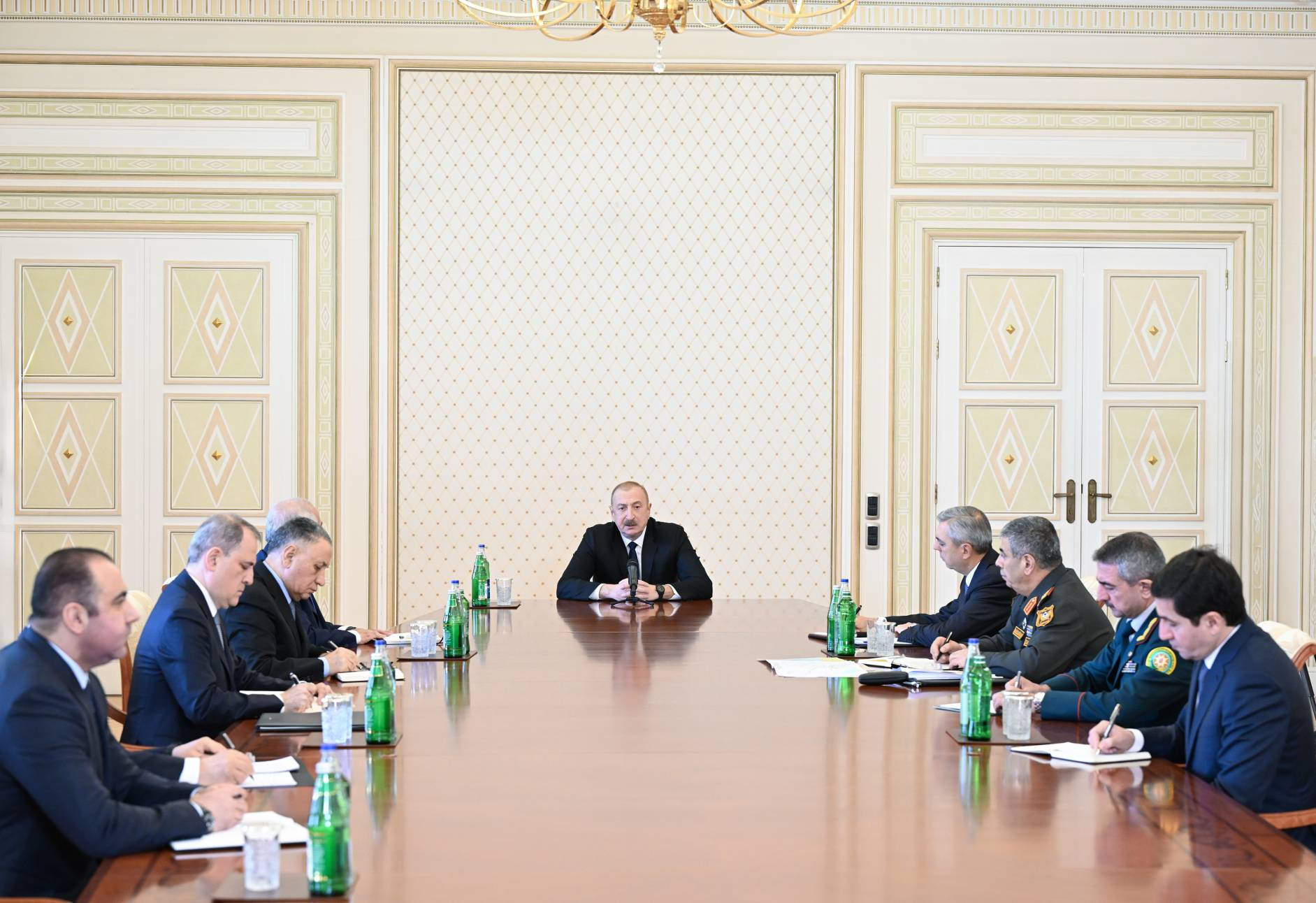
Azerbaijan Security Council meeting following the attacks

The Iranian ambassador to Azerbaijan, Mojtaba Dermichilu, was summoned to the Ministry of Foreign Affairs to present a note of protest regarding the incident.

Construction work on Nakhchivan International Airport has been suspended. To ensure transport connections between Baku and Nakhchivan, flights have been scheduled from Baku to the Turkish city of Iğdir and vice versa, special buses have been arranged to transport passengers from Iğdir Airport to Nakhchivan and vice versa.

The Azerbaijani side announced a NOTAM and closed the country's southern airspace to flights due to operational conditions. The Cabinet of Ministers adopted a decision to temporarily suspend all truck traffic from all border crossing points between Azerbaijan and Iran. On 6 March 2026, the Azerbaijani Embassy in Tehran and the Consulate General in Tabriz were ordered to evacuate their staff.

A Telegram channel affiliated with the Islamic Revolutionary Guard Corps described the targeted area as a place where "foreign officials" were planning an attack against Iran, calling it a warning for Azerbaijan.

On 8 March 2026, Iranian President Masoud Pezeshkian held a phone call with Azerbaijani President Ilham Aliyev, thanked him for condolences over casualties in Iran and for Azerbaijan’s intention to provide humanitarian aid to Iran. Pezeshkian denied Iranian involvement in the attack on Nakhchivan and said the incident would be investigated. Aliyev stressed the importance of investigating the incident.

On 9 March 2026, Azerbaijan reopened its border ‌crossings with Iran for all cargo traffic. The next day, Azerbaijan delivered 30 tonnes of humanitarian aid to Iran.

On 17 March 2026, during a phone call with Iran’s Foreign Minister Seyed Abbas Araghchi, Azerbaijan’s Foreign Minister Jeyhun Bayramov urged Iran to complete its investigation into drone strikes targeting Nakhchivan.

On 18 March 2026, Azerbaijan sent a second 82-ton humanitarian aid shipment to Iran, including 76 tons of food, 4 tons of medicines, 2 tons of medical supplies, and Nowruz gifts.

On 12 April 2026, Azerbaijan reopened its embassy in Tehran with a limited number of diplomatic and administrative staff, including the ambassador.

== Reactions ==
=== Azerbaijan ===
Azerbaijan stated that it reserved the right to take retaliatory measures. Azerbaijan's president Ilham Aliyev accused Iran of terrorism and vowed retaliation, describing the perpetrators as "dishonorable people with ugly faces", especially angered by the fact the attack took place right after he had visited the Iranian Embassy in Baku to offer condolences. Aliyev further stated that Azerbaijan would not participate in operations against Iran; however, it would defend its territorial integrity against any hostile force.

Azerbaijan alleged that they foiled an IRGC plot to carry out "terrorist acts" in Azerbaijan.

The New Azerbaijan Party condemned the attack.

=== Iran ===
Iran's foreign minister Abbas Araghchi and Iranian diplomat Kazem Gharibabadi denied that Iran had attacked Azerbaijan. Araghchi suggested that it was an Israeli false flag operation to draw Azerbaijan into the conflict with Iran.

=== Other actors ===
- Turkey: The Ministry of Foreign Affaris condemned the Iranian strikes, calling for an end to strikes on "third countries", reaffirming continued support for Azerbaijan.
- Albania: Prime Minister Edi Rama condemned the Iranian strikes and called for Iran to be classified "as a terrorist state".
- Pakistan: Prime Minister Shahbaz Sharif condemned the Iranian strikes and reaffirmed support for its "brotherly country".
- Ukraine: The Ministry of Foreign Affairs condemned the Iranian strikes and described it as a "global threat imposed by Iran".
- Moldova: Moldova voiced support for Azerbaijan and condemned the Iranian strikes.
- Kazakhstan: President Kassym-Jomart Tokayev strongly condemned the Iranian strikes.
- France: France strongly condemned the Iranian drone strike on Nakhchivan, calling it a violation of Azerbaijan’s sovereignty and international law, expressed support for Azerbaijan, and wished a speedy recovery to the injured. On 8 march 2026, President of France Emmanuel Macron spoke with Azerbaijan's President Ilham Aliyev and expressed France’s support and solidarity following Iranian strikes targeting Azerbaijan.
- Georgia: Prime Minister Irakli Kobakhidze condemned Iran’s drone attack on Nakhchivan, expressed solidarity with Azerbaijan, and wished a speedy recovery to the injured.
- Armenia: Armenian and Azerbaijani foreign ministers Ararat Mirzoyan and Jeyhun Bayramov held a phone call in which they expressed concern over recent developments and stressed the need to avoid escalation and maintain stability.
- United States: The United States Department of State strongly condemned Iran’s drone attack on Azerbaijan, calling it a violation of the country’s sovereignty, expressing solidarity with Azerbaijan, and stating that attacks on its regional partners are unacceptable and will be met with resolute U.S. support for those partners. The U.S. embassy in Baku also condemned Iran's drone strikes on Nakhchivan and expressed full solidarity with Azerbaijan.
- United Kingdom: The United Kingdom, via its embassy in Baku, condemned the Iranian drone strikes in Nakhchivan and expressed solidarity with Azerbaijan. UK Minister of State Stephen Doughty spoke with Azerbaijan's Foreign Minister, expressing full solidarity and condemning Iranian drone strikes on Nakhchivan Airport as a threat to Azerbaijan's security and regional stability.
- Russia: Russia called on Azerbaijan and Iran, which it referred to as its strategic partners, to exercise maximum restraint, refrain from hasty actions, and avoid creating new divisions in the region that would undermine good-neighborly relations.
- UN: Stéphane Dujarric, Spokesperson for the Secretary-General of the United Nations, stated that the UN remains very concerned by the drone attack on Azerbaijan's territory, considers it a clear violation of Azerbaijan's sovereignty, and called for no further escalation and respect for international law.
- EU: European Union High Representative for Foreign Affairs Kaja Kallas said the Iranian drone strikes on Azerbaijan’s Nakhchivan region are completely unacceptable, represent an escalation by Iran, and increase the risk of the war spreading beyond the Middle East.
