= List of Palestinian rocket attacks on Israel in 2025 =

The following is a list of Palestinian rocket attacks on Israel in 2025. This list contains airborne attacks including rocket and mortar attacks from officially Palestinian controlled land, i.e. Gaza and West Bank Area A and B, to officially Israeli controlled land i.e. boundaries of Israel and West Bank Area C, but does not list attacks between opposing forces within the same territory. The list does not include attacks from other non-Palestinian militant groups fighting during the same war, e.g. Hezbollah.

== January ==
- January 2: Hamas launched rockets towards Netivot. Two rockets were launched by Palestinian fighters, with one rocket intercepted by the IDF and the other landing in a field.
- January 3: Palestinian fighters launch 3 rockets towards southern Israel. Two landed in Israel and one landed in Gaza.
- January 4: An unknown projectile was launched from Northern Gaza to Israel near the Erez Crossing.
- January 6: Palestinian Islamic Jihad (PIJ) launched 3 rockets from Beit Hanoun, in Northern Gaza, towards Sderot. The IDF intercepted 1 rocket and the other 2 struck a house in Sderot.
- January 8: A rocket that was launched from southern Gaza into Israel was intercepted by the IDF.
- January 11: A rocket launched from southern Gaza was intercepted by the IDF.
- January 18: The PIJ launched rockets towards Nir Am.
- January 19-31: Gaza-Israel ceasefire was in effect.

== February ==
- Gaza-Israel ceasefire was in effect all of February.

== March ==
- March 1-18: Gaza-Israel ceasefire was in effect.
- March 20: Hamas launched rockets towards Tel Aviv in response to Israel's offensive on March 18.

== April ==
- April 1: A rocket launched from Gaza was intercepted by the IDF.
- April 2: Two rockets were launched from northern Gaza towards Kissufim, and both were intercepted by the IDF.
- April 6: Hamas launched 10 rockets towards Israel; 5 are intercepted by the IDF.
- April 12: Three rockets launched from Gaza towards Israeli settlements in the Gaza Envelope were intercepted by the IDF.

== May ==
- May 21: A rocket launched from Gaza towards Ashkelon was intercepted by the IDF.
- May 23: A rocket launched from Gaza was intercepted by the IDF.
- May 26: Three rockets were launched from Gaza. Two fell inside Gaza and a third was intercepted by the IDF when it crossed into Israeli territory.

== June ==
- June 1: Palestinians launch rockets from Gaza towards Ein HaShlosha and Nirim; all landed in open areas.
- June 3: The Martyr Muhammad al-Deif Brigades launch rockets from southern Syria into northern Israel.
- June 10-17: Five rockets were launched towards cities in the Gaza envelope; all landed in open areas.
- June 27: A rocket launched from Gaza was intercepted by the IDF.

== July ==
- July 2: Rockets launched from Gaza targeted Sderot and surrounding settlements.
- July 5: Two rockets were launched towards Kissufim, Israel, and were both intercepted by the IDF.

== August ==
- August 2: A rocket was launched from Gaza towards Nirim and Ein HaShlosha, and was intercepted by the IDF.
- August 10: Two rockets were launched from Gaza towards southern Israel.
- August 17: A rocket was launched from Gaza at southern Israel.

== September ==
- September 7: PIJ launched 2 rockets towards Netivot; one was intercepted and one landed in an open area.
- September 21: Two rockets were launched from northern Gaza towards Ashdod. One was intercepted and one landed in an open area.

== October ==
- October 1: Two rockets were launched from Gaza towards Israel during the day, and another 5 at night, during the Jewish holiday of Yom Kippur. All were intercepted except one from the evening barrage which landed in an open area.
- October 7: A rocket was launched from northern Gaza towards Netiv Ha’asara marking the second year anniversary since the massacre in the same settlement.

== See also ==
- Timeline of the Israeli–Palestinian conflict in 2025
