= 2026 Jordanian strikes on Syria =

Military operation by Jordan in southern Syria

- Part of Druze insurgency in Southern Syria during the Aftermath of the Syrian civil war
Date	3 May 2026
Location	As-Suwayda Governorate, Syria
Result	Destruction of smuggling infrastructure

Belligerents
Jordan	Smuggling syndicates National Guard militia (alleged)

Commanders and leaders
Yousef Huneiti	Unknown; Col. Nazih al-Halabi †; Merhi al-Ramthan † (2023)

Units involved
Royal Jordanian Air Force (RJAF)	Local paramilitary factions

Strength
Precision fighter jets and UAVs	UAVs

Casualties and losses
None reported	Disputed; military targets and drug production facilities destroyed Prior/related Jordanian border operations (not this conflict, see Background): 18 Jan 2024 (separate incident, attribution disputed) – 9–10 killed, mostly women/children; 1 Jan 2025 (separate incident) – unspecified number of smugglers killed; 6 Mar 2025 (separate incident) – 4 smugglers killed

The 2026 Jordanian strikes on Syria, codenamed "Operation Jordanian Deterrence", were a series of precision airstrikes launched by the Royal Jordanian Air Force (RJAF) on 3 May 2026. The operation targeted narcotics manufacturing facilities, weapons warehouses and smuggling infrastructure in the As-Suwayda Governorate of southern Syria.

The strikes marked a significant escalation in Jordan's efforts to curb the regional Captagon trade and represented a new phase of security coordination between Amman and the transitional Syrian government led by President Ahmed al-Sharaa.

== Background ==
Following the collapse of Ba'athist Syria in late 2024, the southern Syrian governorate of Suwayda remained a primary hub for the production and trafficking of Captagon. Despite the political transition in Damascus, local armed factions, such as the National Guard in Suwaida, reportedly maintained control over lucrative drug laboratories and smuggling routes.

In January 2025, Jordan and Syria's transitional authorities formed a joint security committee to combat cross-border smuggling and secure their shared frontier.

In July 2025, sectarian violence broke out in Suwayda between Druze and Bedouin factions, later drawing in Syrian government forces and Israeli airstrikes. The Syrian Observatory for Human Rights (SOHR) reported an initial toll of around 250 killed within the first days, a figure that rose to a non-final tally of 1,311 documented deaths (including 196 summary executions carried out by Syrian Defense and Interior Ministry personnel) by 23 July, and further to approximately 1,500 (including 291 summary executions) by 2 August as documentation continued. The Syrian Network for Human Rights (SNHR), using a separate methodology, reported at least 814 killed and 903 wounded as of 24 July. Jordan hosted mediation talks between Syrian and US officials to help consolidate the resulting ceasefire.

In late August 2025, dozens of armed local factions in Suwayda merged into a single force known as the "National Guard" (الحرس الوطني), under the authority of Druze spiritual leader Sheikh Hikmat al-Hijri.

Jordan had already conducted a series of prior airstrikes on suspected smuggling sites in southern Syria, including strikes in December 2025 targeting smuggling farms and storage sites in Suwayda's southeastern countryside.

An earlier, separate round of airstrikes attributed to Jordan struck Suwayda on 18 January 2024, killing at least 9 people according to SOHR (two girls and four women among the dead); Asharq Al-Awsat later gave a final toll of 10 dead (five women, two girls) after recovery teams pulled the last body from rubble in the town of Arman. Local activists said no known drug-trade figures were among the casualties. Jordan's military made no official statement regarding these 2024 strikes.

In early 2026, Jordanian intelligence reported a surge in sophisticated smuggling tactics, including the use of delivery drones and helium-filled balloons to transport narcotics across the 362-kilometer border.

== Timeline ==
- 2 May 2026 – Jordanian Air Force jets began striking multiple sites across at least five towns in Suwayda's countryside (Malh, Arman, Kafr, Busan, later expanding to Shahba, Amtan, Umm al-Rumman, Huwayya, and al-Ghariya), targeting suspected arms and drug warehouses; SOHR reported material damage to civilian homes but no confirmed human losses at time of reporting.
- 3 May 2026 – Jordan officially confirmed "Operation Jordanian Deterrence" (عملية الردع الأردني), targeting weapons and drug traders along its northern border; Syrian state television attributed strikes to Jordan, describing them as hitting a National Guard-linked compound near Shahba. Syrian fact-checking outlet Ta'akad reported the extent of damage and whether there were human casualties remained unknown as of publication. The National Guard publicly protested, stating the strikes were uncoordinated with them, caused civilian panic, and demanded a transparent investigation, while denying involvement in drug trafficking.
- 6 May 2026 – Al Jazeera English published an analysis on Suwayda's re-emergence as a Captagon-trafficking hub near the Jordanian border.
- 20 May 2026 – Jordanian border guards caught 4 people attempting to infiltrate the northern border.
- 25–26 May 2026 – 1 person caught infiltrating, a day after Jordan's Independence Day.
- 9 June 2026 – The Jordanian army disclosed a cumulative tally for 2026: 231 infiltration/smuggling attempts foiled, ~11 million Captagon pills seized, 14kg of other narcotics, and 1,670 "kaff" (palms) of hashish.
- 10–21 June 2026 – Several further infiltration attempts individually foiled (2 caught Jun 10; 1 caught Jun 11; 1 caught Jun 14; 5 caught Jun 21).
- 27 July 2026 – Three separate infiltration attempts foiled the same morning across the northern and southern military zones.
- 12 August 2026 – 5 people caught infiltrating the northern border.
- 24 August 2026 – Jordan hosted (but was not a party to) US-mediated talks between Syrian and Israeli officials, partly addressing "ensuring the security" of Syria's Druze community.
- 27 August 2026 – 2 people caught infiltrating the northern border (most recent reported incident).
- 30 August 2026 – In a separate, internal Suwayda incident, gunfire from a National Guard checkpoint at al-Anqoud roundabout in Suwayda city wounded two civilians.

== The Operation ==
On the morning of 3 May 2026, the RJAF conducted "precision air operations" across several locations.

=== Use of Unmanned Aerial Vehicles (UAVs) ===
Local observers and Syrian state media reported significant drone activity accompanying the 3 May airstrikes. According to military analysts, the Royal Jordanian Air Force utilized UAVs for real-time surveillance and battle damage assessment (BDA). Reports also suggested that loitering munitions were used to target mobile smuggling units attempting to flee the primary strike zones in Shahba. The use of drones was viewed as a direct response to the increasing use of "kamikaze" and payload-dropping drones by smuggling syndicates earlier in 2026.

=== Primary Targets ===
- Shahba: Airstrikes targeted a site believed to be a former State Security branch, which intelligence suggested was being used by trafficking syndicates as a command center.
- Arman and Bosan: Warehouses and workshops suspected of housing narcotics laboratories and weapons intended for cross-border transit were destroyed.
- As-Suwayda City: Local reports noted drone activity and strikes near industrial zones, though the Jordanian military maintained all targets were non-residential.
- Residential impact: Though Jordanian authorities described the mission as being aimed at facilities used by drug and weapons traffickers, local and regional news reports suggested that some of the attacks targeted civilian buildings such as houses and a car garage in Arman, an unoccupied house in Shahba, and a cemetery in Amtan.

== Reactions ==
- Jordan: The Jordanian government claimed that they had conducted the operation in full coordination with the new Syrian authorities.
- Syria: The airstrikes were given coverage on Syrian state television.
- Druze Leadership: Local leaders in Suwayda expressed concern that the targeting of sites near urban centers like Shahba endangered civilians.

== See also ==
- Captagon
- Jordan–Syria relations
- Syrian civil war
- Druze insurgency in Southern Syria
