= Storming of Paga Outpost =

During the October 7 attacks on Israel, Hamas militants stormed the IDF Paga outpost. Paga outpost (officially known as Magen Be'eri) is located on the Israeli side of the border with the Gaza Strip, between kibbutz Be'eri and Nahal Oz across from the Gazan village Juhor ad-Dik. On the morning of 7 October 2023, approximately 150 Hamas militants stormed the outpost defended by 25 IDF soldiers from the 13th battalion of the Golani Brigade. The outpost was overtaken by Hamas for several hours till it was recaptured by the IDF later that afternoon. The battle lasted a total of 11 hours at the end of the which, 14 Israeli soldiers had been killed and a few dozen Hamas militants. Another IDF soldier died of his wounds sustained in the battle two months later.

On 11 December 2024, the IDF announced it had eliminated Fehmi Salmi, a Nukhba Company Commander in Hamas' Zeitoun Battalion, who had let the Hamas attack on the Paga outpost.
