= Killing of Enere McLaren-Taana =

2024 death in New Zealand

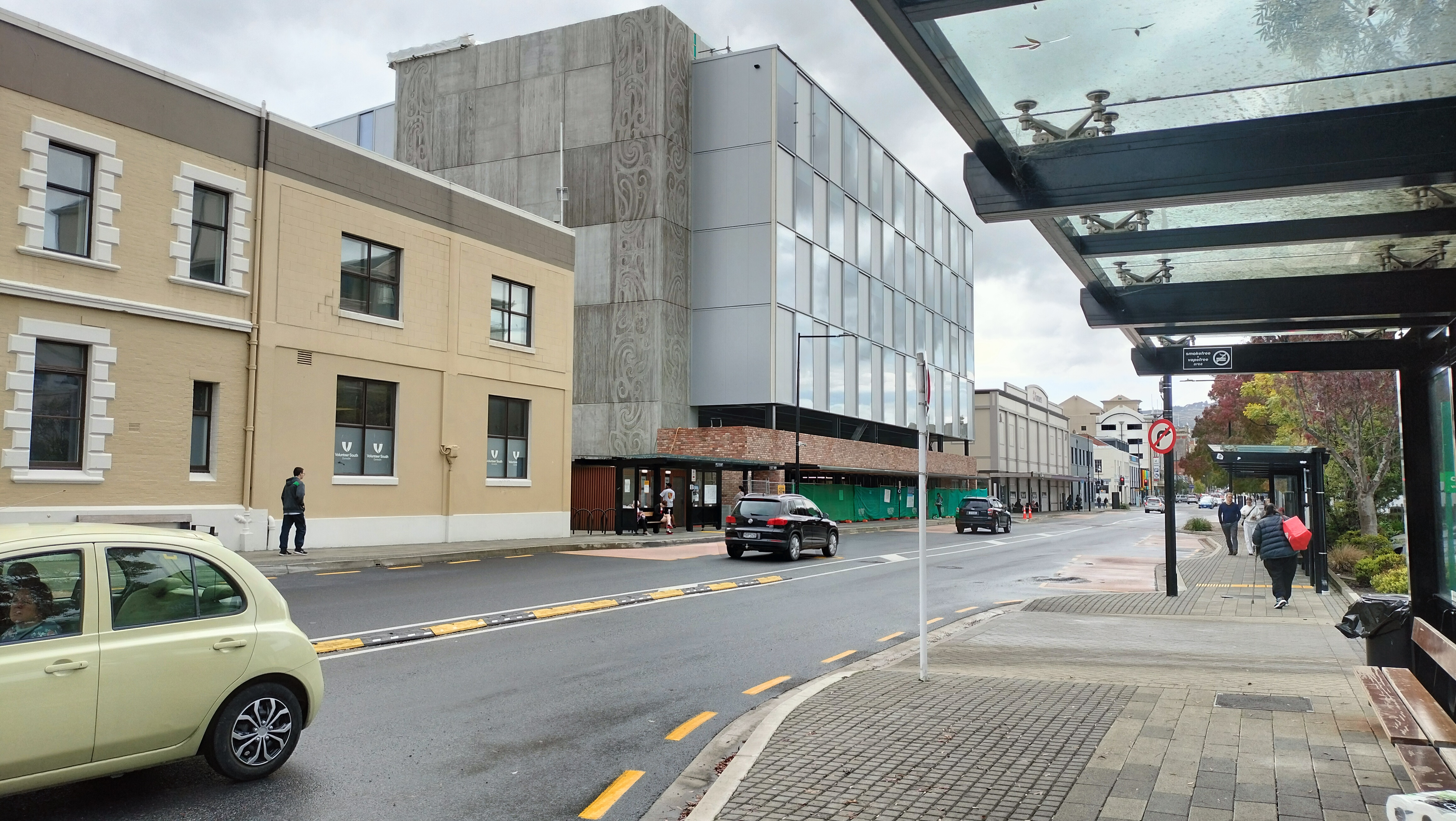
The Dunedin bus hub on Great King Street with Dunedin Community House and the Pacific Radiology building in the background.

Enere McLaren-Taana was a 16-year-old Trinity Catholic College student who died on 23 May 2024 following a stabbing at Dunedin's bus hub in Great King Street. A 13-year-old boy was subsequently arrested and charged with his murder on 24 May. The defendant's murder trial began on 26 February 2025. Following a three week trial, the defendant was convicted of manslaughter on 17 March 2025. On 11 July the defendant, who was granted permanent name suppression, was sentenced to a prison term of three years and three months.

McLaren-Taana's death also drew attention to public safety concerns at Dunedin's bus hub. In response, the Dunedin City Council and Otago Regional Council launched a campaign to improve safety and security at the city's bus hub.

== Background ==
=== Enere McLaren-Taana ===
Enere John Jnr PoePoe McLaren-Taana was a 16-year-old student who attended Trinity Catholic College. He had also previously attended King's High School. He was of Cook Islands descent and was born on 2 December 2007. McLaren-Taana was involved in rugby league, club rugby, Trinity College's basketball team and was also a dancer in Dunedin's Te Vaka Cook Islands community group.

=== The defendant ===
The-then 13-year old defendant is a migrant who immigrated with his family to New Zealand. Before settling down in Dunedin, he and his family grew up in a small town. Since infancy, he suffered from colic, which caused him to experience sleeplessness. While in custody, the defendant was diagnosed with Attention Deficit Hyperactivity Disorder (ADHD), which had manifested in his active behaviour and love for climbing as a child.

While his primary school years were without incident, the defendant's mother said that her son's personality and behaviour changed as a result of bullying he encountered at high school. In August 2023, the boy was assaulted and robbed by a group of youths in Halfway Bush in August 2023. While the defendant's descriptions of the assailants, their attire, the nature of the assault (including the presence of a knife) varied each time he recounted the incident, the primary attacker admitted to punching the defendant and stealing his lollies during police interrogation. According to the defendant, the incident had stemmed from him accidentally taking a bike belonging to the brother of one of the assailants. The defendant had met with the older brother and his friends as a gesture of friendship and reconciliation but had instead been assaulted.

According to the defendant, his mother and psychiatrists, the Halfway Bush assault incident traumatised him and caused him to develop post-traumatic stress disorder (PTSD). In addition to changes in his behaviour and attire, the defendant began carrying a pocket knife whenever he left home. The defendant also began watching fight videos on YouTube. In 2024, the defendant transferred to a different high school after experiencing bullying. In April 2024, the defendant reportedly flashed his knife at a former bully during an encounter at the bus stop, which he said emboldened him.

=== Dunedin Bus Hub ===
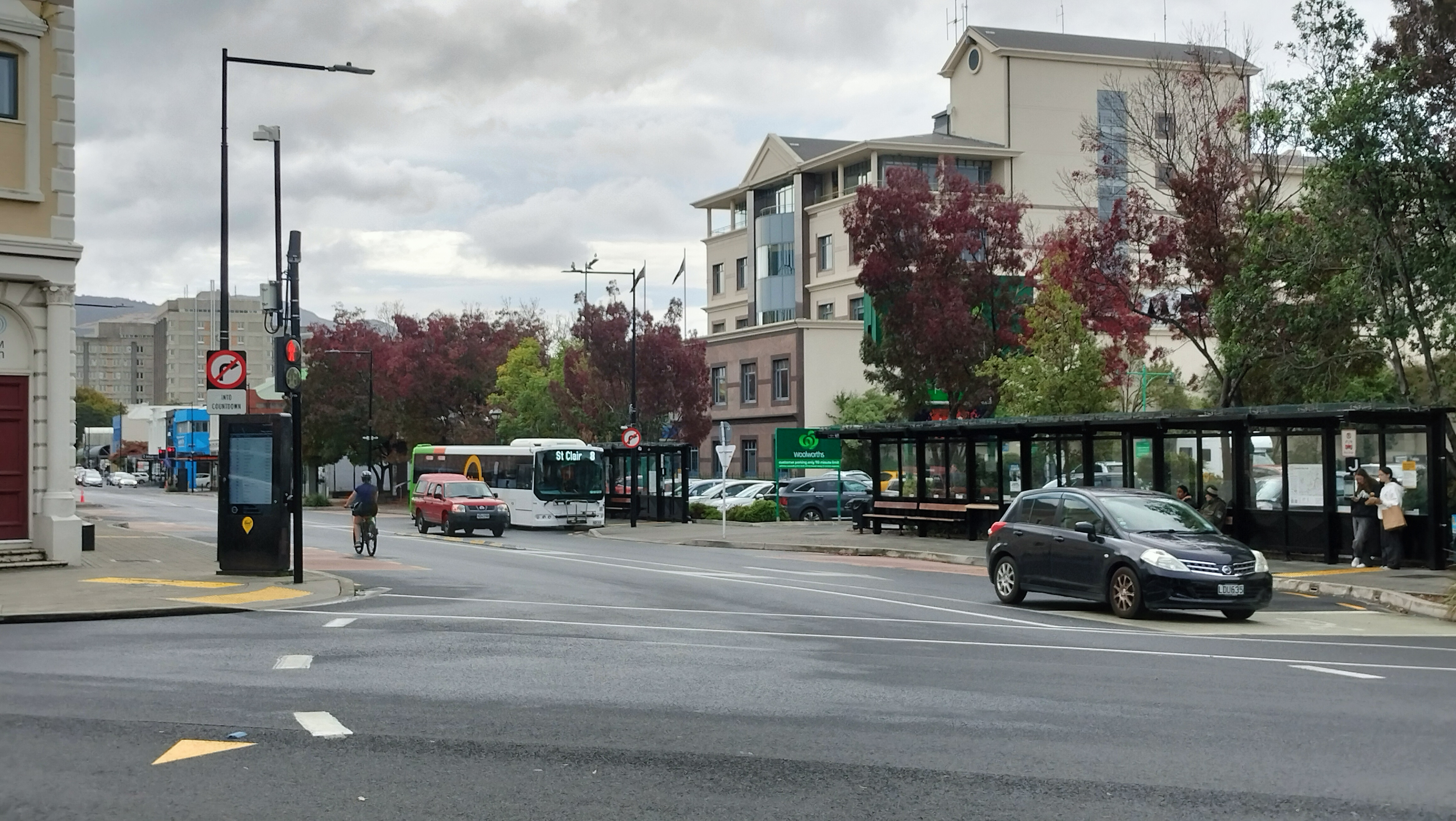
The Dunedin bus hub on Great King Street on 31 March 2025 as viewed from Moray Place.

On 20 March 2019, the Otago Regional Council (ORC) formally opened a new bus hub on Great King Street between Moray Place and St Andrew Street. The bus hub was built with ten bus bays, shelters, seating, toilets and bus stops with audio buttons. The Dunedin bus hub was created to centralise public transportation in the city and to ease congestion on George Street, the city's main street. By late May 2024, local leaders and commuters including Dunedin Student Council presidents Rohan O'Shea and Alice Johnston and Dunedin Secondary Principals' Association chairman and Bayfield High School principal Mark Jones had raised concerns about safety and harassment of children and young people at the Dunedin bus hub.

== The incident ==
On 23 May 2024, the 13-year old defendant had been sent home from his school after being accused by teachers of vaping inside a toilet. Following the incident, the school had arranged for a teacher to send the defendant home to his parents. The defendant later claimed it was a case of mistaken identity and accused a prefect of "snitching" on him. According to text messages submitted as evidence during the trial, the defendant had intended to travel to South Dunedin to "settle scores" with the prefect. The defendant had reportedly told his father that he was traveling to Macandrew Bay to meet a friend.

The defendant traveled on a bus to the Dunedin Bus Hub where he intended to catch another bus to South Dunedin. There, he attracted the attention of the victim McLaren-Taana due to his attire, which consisted of a white balaclava, sideways cap, green top, black shoulder bag and black-and-blue socks. According to Stuff, the alleged stabbing incident occurred after a friend of McLaren-Taana collided with the accused at the Dunedin bus hub. The victim had intervened on his friend's behalf. Following a verbal confrontation, the two boys fought, culminating in the defendant stabbing McLaren-Taana with his pocket knife. While the defence claimed that the victim had provoked the fight by goading the defendant about his attire, the prosecution had contended that the defendant had instigated the fight.

Following the stabbing, emergency services responded to the stabbing incident at the Dunedin bus hub at about 3:10 pm. Detective Senior Sergeant Kallum Croudis later confirmed that a 16-year-old boy was taken to Dunedin Hospital where he later died of his injuries in the evening. Croudis also confirmed that Police had arrested a 13-year-old male in relation to the incident.

The alleged stabbing occurred opposite the Dunedin Central Police Station, which attracted social media commentary. Following the stabbing, ORC transport manager Julian Phillips confirmed that one bus stop was temporarily closed. Phillips also announced that the ORC and Dunedin City Council (DCC) would deploy security guards at the bus hub and on buses.

== Investigation ==
By 24 May 2024, Otago Coastal Area Commander Inspector Marty Gray confirmed that Police had completed a scene investigation on Great King Street and had launched several inquiries. A post-mortem of the murder victim was also carried out that sane day. Police also worked with Victim Support to support McLaren-Taana's family. Police also established an online portal for people to anonymously submit photos and videos of the incident for the Police investigation. Police also recovered a single knife from the crime scene, leading them to believe that the victim died as the result of a stab wound.

== Legal proceedings and trial ==
On 24 May 2024, a 13-year-old boy appeared in the Dunedin Youth Court where he was charged with the victim's murder. He was scheduled to appear in the Dunedin High Court on 11 June 2024. On 11 June, the defendant pleaded not guilty. He was remanded into custody until 3 July 2024. On 2 July, the defendant's lawyer applied for the defendant to be released on electronically-monitored bail and for continued interim name suppressions. Justice Lisa Preston reserved her decision. A trial date was set for 24 February 2025.

=== Opening arguments ===
On 26 February 2025, the now 14-year-old defendant's trial began at the Dunedin High Court, with Justice Robert Osborne presiding. A jury was empanelled, with both the Crown and defence making opening statements. On the first day, Crown prosecutor Richard Smith outlined the Crown's case to a jury consisting of eight women and four men. The Crown argued that the defendant had stabbed Taana-McLaren following an altercation in the Dunedin bus hub. The stabbing caused a 10-12 cm deep wound which penetrated McLaren-Taana's muscles, stomach and spinal tissue. The victim was rushed to hospital but succumbed to his injuries. Smith also told the jury there were inconsistencies between the defendant's testimony and CCTV footage. The Crown also played CCTV footage of the stabbing incident and the immediate aftermath.

The defendant's lawyer Anne Stevens KC told the court that the defendant had never met McLaren-Taana and was acting in self-defence when he stabbed the victim. She said that the 14-year-old defendant had suffered from post-traumatic stress syndrome after experiencing a robbery in August 2023 and had carried a knife since then. Stevens argued that the defendant saw McLaren-Taana as a physical threat since the victim was bigger and older. She also argued that the victim had goaded the defendant prior to the stabbing incident. Judge Osborne also issued an order prohibiting anyone aged under 14 years from attending trial proceedings due to confronting footage and testimony.

=== Trial evidence ===
The Crown presented evidence from eyewitnesses, CCTV footage and a staff member from the defendant's school. In addition, the Crown drew upon digital forensic evidence from the defendant's Chromebook and the defendant's Police interview following McLaren-Taana's killing.

During the trial, the defendant told the court that he was traumatised after being bullied at school and later being assaulted and robbed in 2023. He also told the court that he was wrongfully accused of vaping. Defence counsel Stevens argued that the defendant was acting in self defence and did not intend to kill McLaren-Taana. To counter the defendant's testimony, the Crown played video footage of the bus hub altercation between the defendant and the victim. During cross-examination, Crown prosecutor Bates also questioned the defendant about text messages he had sent threatening violence against a prefect who reported on him for allegedly vaping on school grounds. The defendant's mother also testified that her son had been traumatised after being robbed in Halfway Bush in August 2023. The defence also presented two witnesses who testified they had been assaulted by the victim McLaren-Taana in early 2024. Justice Osborne told the jury that the witnesses' testimony was intended to show that the victim had a propensity towards violence but warned jurors not to conclude that he had acted violently towards the defendant in May 2024.

Two forensic psychiatrists Maxwell Pankhurst and Brandon Strange, who had assessed the teenage defendant following McLaren-Taana's killing, also testified that the defendant suffered from post-traumatic stress disorder and Attention deficit hyperactive disorder (ADHD), which they argued were mitigating factors in his offending.

=== Closing arguments ===
On 12 March, the defence and Crown lawyers delivered their closing arguments. Anne Stephens KC argued that the defendant had acted in self-defence against McLaren-Taana, likening their confrontation to a "David and Goliath situation." She argued that CCTV footage and bus driver Chris Kitto's testimony showed that the victim was the aggressor who was "spoiling for a fight" with the defendant. By contrast, Crown prosecutor Richard Smith disputed the defence's self-defence argument, arguing that CCTV footage showed that the defendant had instigated the fight over a perceived personal insult by the victim. He also argued that the defendant gave four inconsistent accounts of the 2023 Halfway Bush robbery incident and disputed the defendant's testimony that he did not know that such a stabbing could result in death. Smith concluded that the defendant pursued the victim with the intent of murdering him. Justice Osborne summarized the case and the jury retired for the day.

=== Verdict ===
After two days of deliberation and breaking for the weekend, the jury convicted him of manslaughter on 17 March. While the jurors rejected both the Crown's argument that the defendant murdered McLaren-Taana and the defence's self-defence argument, they agreed that the defendant did not intend to kill McLaren-Taana or display the requisite recklessness needed to prove a murder charge. The Crown had no legal grounds for appealing the verdict. Family members of both the victim and defendant attended the verdict. Justice Osborne commended the behaviour of the public gallery and the defendant throughout the trial. The defendant is expected to be sentenced on 11 July 2025, with his immigration status being a factor in sentencing decisions. Osborne also ordered that the defendant's name suppression and bail conditions continue until sentencing.

=== Sentencing ===
On 11 July, Justice Osborne sentenced the defendant, who was granted permanent name suppression, to a prison term of three years and three months. During the hearing, defence lawyer Stevens read the defendant's apology and said that he made the "fatal error" of using a knife based on the "immature logic" of self preservation after being severely bullied. She also argued for a discharge without conviction, saying that the defendant and his family faced the risk of deportation due to his criminal conviction. By contrast, prosecutor Smith argued against a discharge without conviction due to the serious nature of the crime.

In delivering his judgment, Osborne declined the defence's application for a discharge without conviction, describing the manslaughter of McLaren-Taana as a "grave offending" and rejecting the defendant's self defence argument. Osborne accepted that the defendant faced the risk of deportation due to his offending but said that the defendant had a history of carrying a knife with the knowledge that would affect his immigration status.

Osborne also acknowledged the impact of McLaren-Taana's death on his family, who attending the sentencing hearing wearing shirts and hoodies emblazoned with the victim's face. McLaren-Taana's father John, brother Rick and aunt read victim impact statements condemning the defendant. Following the sentencing hearing, several of the victim's relatives criticised the defendant's permanent name suppression and sentencing as insufficient. McLaren-Taana's mother also alleged that her son had been defamed during the court proceedings.

=== Appeals ===
On 1 August, the defendant appealed his conviction and sentence at the Court of Appeal of New Zealand on undisclosed grounds. The Court of Appeal heard arguments from both the defence and prosecution on 11 and 12 November. Defence counsel Anna Stevens KC said that the defendant should not have been convicted of manslaughter, arguing that he was acting in self defence and that his criminal conviction would affect his immigration status. Crown counsel Peter Marshall defended the original sentence, contending that Justice Osborne had considered the defendant's personal circumstances including his age and background. The Court panel has reserved their decision.

On 12 May 2026, the Court of Appeal upheld the defendant's manslaughter conviction but reduced his sentence to two years and seven months, making him eligible for parole in June 2026. In early August 2026, the defendant was denied early release by a parole board after seriously injuring another boy while in youth justice custody. While the teenage defendant no longer had a valid visa, his family had appealed the decision on humanitarian grounds. On 6 October, the Supreme Court of New Zealand granted leave for the defendant to appeal against the Court of Appeal's decision. McLaren-Taana's father John McLaren criticised the defendant's sentence and legal appeal.

On 20 November 2026, the Supreme Court heard arguments from the defendant's lawyers Anne Stevens KC and Kerry Cook KC, and Crown counsel Peter Marshall. Stevens and Cook argued that the defendant's manslaughter conviction be dismissed on the grounds of self defence and his personal circumstances including being a prior victim of bullying and being diagnosed with ADHD and PTSD. They also regarded the Court of Appeal's sentence reduction as insufficient and argued that his manslaughter conviction made his family liable for deportation. In response, Marshall argued the defence's appeal bey dismissed, saying that the defendant's manslaughter of McLareen-Taana had caused "profound and irreparable grief" for his family. He also told the Court that the defendant had admitted spending six months preparing for another fight, watching fighting videos online and using a fridge as an improvised boxing bag. Marshall said that the defendant had been warned by a youth worker prior to the fatal incident that his behaviour placed his temporary visa at risk. Family members of McLaren-Taana attended the hearing. The Supreme Court has reserved their decision.

== Reactions ==
=== Community responses ===
On 24 May, about 100 relatives and friends of McLaren-Taana gathered at the Dunedin bus hub to leave flowers and tributes, and to take part in a blessing. A haka was also performed. That same day, Trinity College principal Kate Nicholson expressed support for Taana-McLaren's family, stating "It is so devastating, heartbreaking and sad to lose someone so young and full of energy and promise in such a senseless and horrific way." King's High School acting rector Darin Smith and the Otago Rugby League also extended messages of condolences.

On 25 May, Otago Community Rugby manager Warren Kearney confirmed that Trinity Catholic College's Intermediate Otago Combined Sassenachs rugby team had cancelled an upcoming game against Dunstan High School to honour his memory. His friends also gathered at the bus stop on 24 May to leave flowers and tributes, and to take part in a blessing. Otago Community Rugby also published a social media post expressing condolences and sympathy for McLaren-Taana's family, friends and teammates. On 26 May, Secondary Principals Association president Vaughan Couillault expressed concern about the rise of violence between students and incidents resulting in serious injury.

=== Local authorities ===
On 24 May, Inspector Marty Gray confirmed that the Police were also working with the DCC, ORC, the Education Department, iwi (Māori tribes) and other partners to address anti-social behaviour at the Dunedin bus hub. Police also increased foot and car patrols, and CCTV surveillance around Great King Street.

On 25 May, Mayor of Dunedin Jules Radich said that he was willing to consult Police, schools, the Dunedin City Council and bus operators to develop a "wider community response" to concerns about safety at the Dunedin bus hub and on the city's bus network. By 29 May, a multi-agency "working group" was drafting terms of references for the inquiry into public safety at the bus hub. Radich confirmed that the working group would seek to consult schools, bus users and the wider community. In addition, Otago Regional Council Chair Gretchen Robertson confirmed that the Council would be consulting with the DCC, Police and other parties to improve safety at the bus hub. She also confirmed that the ORC and Police would beef up security guards and police personnel at the bus hub.

On 2 September 2024, the ORC launched a public relations campaign called "It's Cool to be Kind" to improve safety on buses, hubs and stops in Dunedin and Queenstown. On 22 October 2024, the ORC confirmed it had awarded security company First Security a contract for bus security services in Dunedin in response to the Dunedin bus hub stabbing. Security guards serving at the Dunedin bus hub and some buses would be fitted with body cameras.

In January 2025 the ORC, along with the Dunedin Youth Council and the Dunedin Student Council, launched a bus safety campaign in response to McLaren-Taana's death. The Council briefly suspended the campaign in early March after the pro-Israel advocacy group, the Israel Institute of New Zealand, had complained about a teenager wearing a keffiyeh in a campaign poster. On 4 March, 40 pro-Palestinian supporters held a lunchtime gathering in Dunedin's Octagon to protest against the Israel Institute's complaint.

By 22 March 2025, the Otago Daily Times reported that public confidence about safety in the Dunedin Bus Hub had improved due to an increased security and police presence. While local businesses had reported a decline in foot traffic following the May 2024 stabbing, business had improved due to improved security measures. However, Trinity Catholic College principal Kate Nicholson described the changes as "short-term fixes" and advocated a cultural shift among bus hub users. By March 2025, the local police had established a prevention team consisting of a sergeant and four constables.
