= 2024 Tyre airstrikes =

Ground invasion and airstrikes on Tyre District by Israel

- Part of the Israel–Hezbollah conflict (2023–present) and the 2024 Israeli invasion of Lebanon
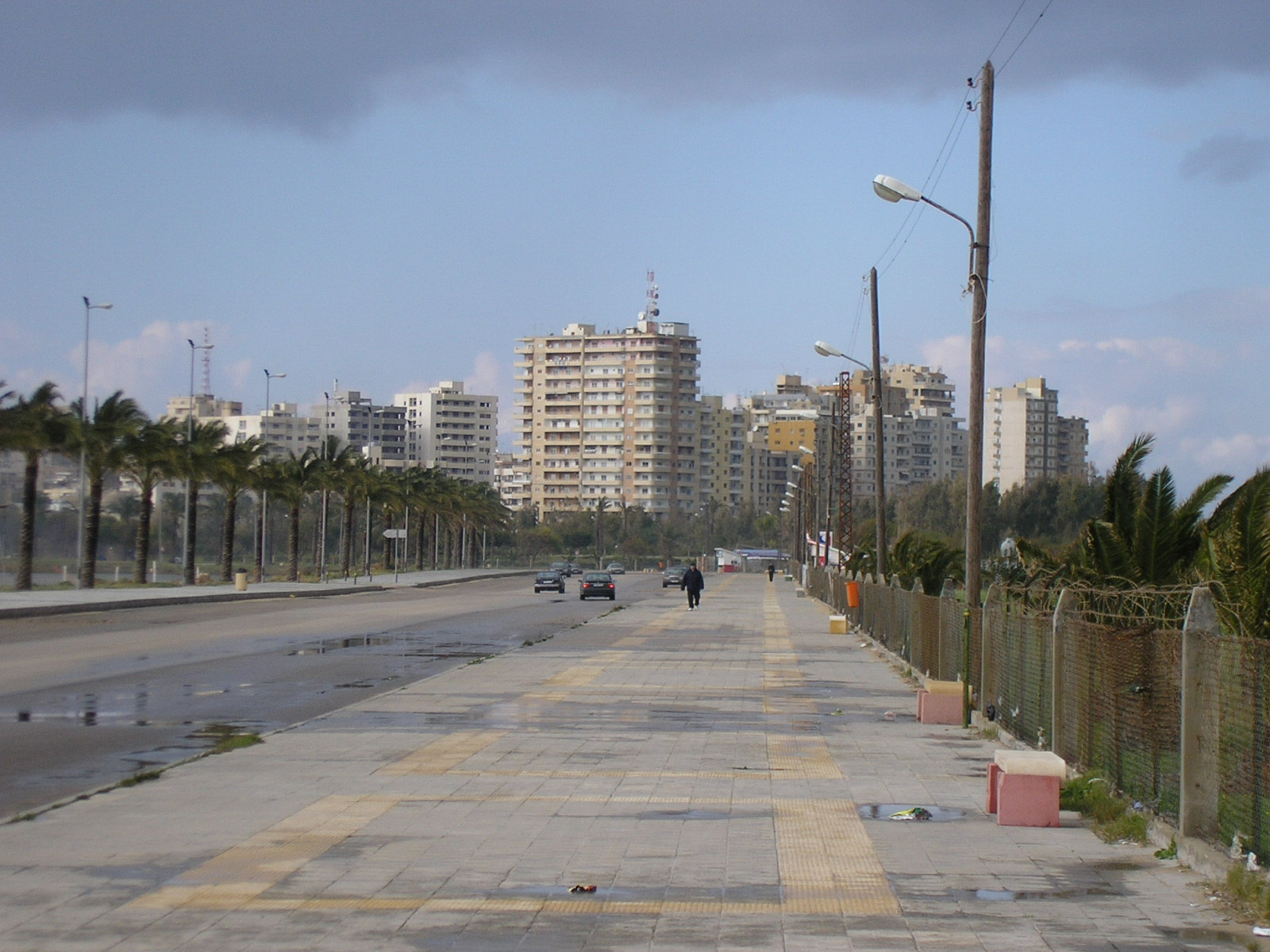
- Tyre in 2006
Date	23–25 October 2024
Location	Tyre District, Lebanon

Belligerents
Israel	Hezbollah

Units involved
Israel Defense Forces; Israeli Ground Forces; Israeli Air Force	Hezbollah military; (Hezbollah) Radwan Force

Casualties and losses
- (Lebanon) 7+ Lebanese civilians killed (Lebanon) 17+ Lebanese civilians wounded

Between 23–25 October 2024, the Israeli Air Force launched airstrikes on the city of Tyre and several villages in the Tyre District in southern Lebanon. The airstrikes also struck near Roman, ancient Phoenician, and Crusader archaeological sites, causing significant concern from UNESCO for the potential damaging or destruction of cultural heritage.

== Background ==
Tyre is a city in Lebanon, one of the oldest continuously inhabited cities in the world, though in medieval times for some centuries by just a small population. It was one of the earliest Phoenician metropolises and the legendary birthplace of Europa, her brothers Cadmus and Phoenix, as well as Carthage's founder Dido (Elissa). The city has many ancient sites, including the Tyre Hippodrome, and was added as a whole to the list of UNESCO World Heritage Sites in 1984.

== Airstrikes ==
The majority of Tyre's religiously diverse population of about 50,000 evacuated following the onset of Israeli bombardments, leaving about 14,500 residents left by 22 October 2024.

On 23 October 2024, Israel launched a large airstrike in the center of Tyre, resulting in large sections of the city being destroyed. The Lebanese National News Agency and residents of Tyre reported that the airstrike resulted in major earth-shaking explosions that caused massive plumes of black smoke to emanate from the site of the airstrike, located about 500 meters from the city's Roman-period archaeological ruins. At least one strike was reported to have struck within 50 meters of the ruins, and other strikes struck close to a coastal group of ancient Phoenician and Crusader ruins. The UNESCO World Heritage organization expressed concern over possible harm done to the site, with evaluators being unable to conduct a complete damage assessment due to the ongoing conflict.

The airstrike completely destroyed seven buildings, damaged over four hundred apartments, and injured at least two people. The bombardments caused large numbers of the remaining population to evacuate. The Lebanese Civil Defense used loudspeakers to issue urgent evacuation orders, with workers aiding older and disabled residents in evacuation. Several vehicles were photographed entering Sidon after evacuating from Tyre.

A couple of hours prior to the airstrikes, the Israeli Defense Forces issued evacuation warnings for a cluster of buildings in the center of the city, instructing residents to move to the north of the Awali. Israel reported that they had struck multiple "command and control complexes of various Hezbollah units", referring to Tyre as a significant Hezbollah stronghold. The city was reported to be a "ghost town" by 24 October 2024.

Beginning on 25 October 2024, several villages in the west of Tyre District were bombarded by airstrikes and artillery fire, including Alma al-Shaab, Dhaira, Tayr Harfa, Zebqin, Marwahin, and Yarine.

On 24 October 2024, the town of Maarakeh in southern Lebanon witnessed a violent escalation in the confrontations between Hezbollah and Israel. The clashes began with an intensification of Israeli raids, targeting Hezbollah sites and main roads in the area. Hezbollah responded by shelling Israeli areas with missiles and using drones, which led to injuries and losses on both sides.

== See also ==
- 2023 Israel–Lebanon shellings
- Siege of Tyre (332 BC)
- Siege of Tyre (586–573 BC)
- Siege of Tyre (1187)
