= List of Palestinian rocket attacks on Israel in 2024 =

The following is a list of Palestinian rocket attacks on Israel in 2024. This list contains airborne attacks including rocket and mortar attacks from officially Palestinian controlled land, i.e. Gaza and West Bank Area A and B, to officially Israeli controlled land i.e. boundaries of Israel and West Bank Area C, but does not list attacks between opposing forces within the same territory. The list does not include attacks from other non-Palestinian militant groups fighting during the same war, e.g. Hezbollah.

== January ==
- January 8: The Al-Qassam Brigades fired rockets towards Tel Aviv and the Al-Quds Brigades fired rockets towards Sderot and Nir Am. Eight rockets were fired from Gaza.
- January 18: The Al-Qassam Brigades fired rockets towards Kissufim in southern Israel.
- January 26: The PIJ fired rockets towards southern Israel, including Ashkelon, Nir Am, and Sderot. The Mujahideen Brigades fired rockets at Nahal Oz and what it claimed was an IDF brigade headquarters.
- January 29: At least 10 rockets fired from Gaza toward central Israel.

== February ==
- February 1: PIJ launched mortars towards Kissufim. The Mujahideen Brigades launched rockets at an Israeli base in Re'im.
- February 8: 14 locations in southern Israel were targeted by rockets. The Palestinian Mujahideen Movement fired rockets from Gaza targeting 13 locations in southern Israel. The Democratic Front for the Liberation of Palestine (DFLP) reported that its fighters fired a rocket salvo targeting a 14th town in southern Israel.
- February 12: The Palestinian Mujahideen Movement fired a rocket salvo into southern Israel.
- February 13: At least 2 rockets launched into southern Israel. The Palestinian Mujahideen Movement fired rockets towards a town close to Beit Lahia in the Gaza Envelope. The DFLP launched rockets towards the Gaza Envelope.
- February 15: PIJ fired rockets from Gaza towards Ashkelon.
- February 16: 3 rockets fired towards Israel.
- February 26: 2 rocket attacks launched towards Israel: PIJ launched rockets towards the Kissufim military site and the Palestinian Mujahideen Movement launched rockets towards Re'im.
- February 27: PIJ fired rockets from the Gaza Strip towards Ashkelon.
- February 28: PIJ launched rockets from Gaza towards Kissufim.
- February 29: The Popular Resistance Committees fired rockets from Gaza into southern Israel.

== March ==
- March 2: The PIJ launched a rocket salvo towards Hatzerim.
- March 7: The PIJ fired rockets targeting Nahal Oz.
- March 14: The PIJ fired rockets into Israeli towns in the Gaza Envelope.
- March 15: The PIJ fired 2 rockets towards Sderot, one landed in an open area and one was intercepted by Israel.
- March 16: The Mujahideen Brigades fired rockets into southern Israel, and red alerts were reported in Nahal Oz.
- March 21: Rockets were fired from the Gaza Strip at Beeri and were claimed by PIJ and the Popular Front for the Liberation of Palestine (PFLP).
- March 25: Al-Qassam Brigades launch 8 rockets from northern Gaza toward Ashdod. The PIJ published footage of their Al-Quds Brigades firing a barrage of rockets at Sderot.
- March 26: The PIJ launched rockets towards Ashkelon and Ashdod. The DFLP mortared an Israeli military site in the south of Israel.
- March 27: The PIJ launched a rocket towards Kissufim, but it landed in an open area.
- March 29: The DFLP and PIJ fired rockets towards Israeli towns in the south.

== April ==
- April 3: PIJ launch rockets at Kissufim.
- April 4: 7 rocket launches from Gaza were initiated toward Israel including 2 from PIJ intercepted by Israel and one from PLFP targeting Kissufim.
- April 7: PIJ launch 5 rockets towards southern Israel; all are intercepted by iron dome. The Mujahideen Brigades launch at least 1 rocket towards Re'im.
- April 12: PIJ and DFLP launch rockets towards Sderot, 3 of which were intercepted by the IDF.
- April 16: Two rockets were launched from Gaza towards southern Israel, both of which landed in empty fields.
- April 17: The Popular Resistance Committees fired a barrage of rockets towards an IDF base in Zikim.
- April 18: PIJ launch a rocket towards Sderot and a rocket towards Ashkelon.
- April 19: PIJ launched a second round of rockets towards Ashkelon.
- April 20: The Al-Aqsa Martyrs' Brigades and PIJ launch two rockets towards Nir Am and Sderot.
- April 21: The PIJ launched rockets towards an IDF base in southern Israel. Hamas operating in Lebanon fired 20 rockets into northern Israel
- April 23: The Al-Quds Brigades launched four rockets from the northern Gaza Strip towards Sderot and Nir Am. The Iron Dome intercepted the four rockets, but they caused a fire in a warehouse due to rocket shrapnel without causing any injuries. The al-Aqsa Martyrs' Brigade and DFLP jointly launch a rocket towards the IDF base in Zikim.
- April 24: Mujahideen Brigades launch rockets towards three separate towns in southern Israel. The militia publicized the launches were in memory of the death date of the founder of the Mujahideen movement.
- April 25: The Mujahideen Brigades launched a rocket towards Reim.
- April 26: The Mujahideen Brigades launched a rocket towards Sderot.
- April 28: The DFLP launched 2 rockets towards towns in the Gaza envelope.
- April 29: Palestinian fighters launched 2 rockets towards Ashdod. The PIJ launched 2 rockets towards towns in the Gaza Envelope.

== May ==
- May 1: Hamas launched 4 rockets at southern Israel. All rockets landed in open areas.
- May 3: Hamas launched a rocket towards Nirim, Israel.
- May 5: Hamas launched 14 rockets and mortars towards IDF forces stationed near Kerem Hashalom killing four Israeli soldiers. The DFLP launched mortars into southern Israel.
- May 6: The PIJ launched rockets towards towns in the Gaza envelope. The DFLP launched mortars towards the IDF near Sufa, Israel.
- May 26: Rockets were fired from Rafah towards Tel Aviv around 2 pm, one landed in Tel Aviv, one landed in Kfar Saba creating a large crater, and two women were injured. Between 8 and 12 rockets were launched, at least 3 were intercepted and at least 5 landed in open areas.
- May 27: A rocket was fired from Gaza towards Nahal Oz, but landed in an open area.
- May 28: A rocket was fired towards Mefalsim and Ein HaShlosha.
- May 31: The Al-Aqsa Martyrs Brigades launched a barrage of rockets towards Kissufim, Israel.

== June ==
- June 4: The Mujahideen Brigades launched rockets into southern Israel.
- June 5: Rockets were launched from central Gaza towards Kissufim.
- June 9: Four rockets were launched from Gaza towards Sderot.
- June 11: The PIJ launched rockets towards Kissufim.
- June 12: Mortars were launched from Gaza towards IDF site near Nahal Oz.
- June 13: The PIJ launched rockets towards Ashdod and Ashkelon and mortars towards Kerem Shalom.
- June 15: Hamas and the PIJ launch rockets towards Sufa, Israel. The al Nasser Salah ad Din Brigades and the PIJ launched rockets towards Kissufim. A rocket was launched from the Khan Younis area and fell in the Gaza Envelope.

== See also ==
- Timeline of the Israeli–Palestinian conflict in 2024
