= List of pro-Palestinian protests in Sweden =

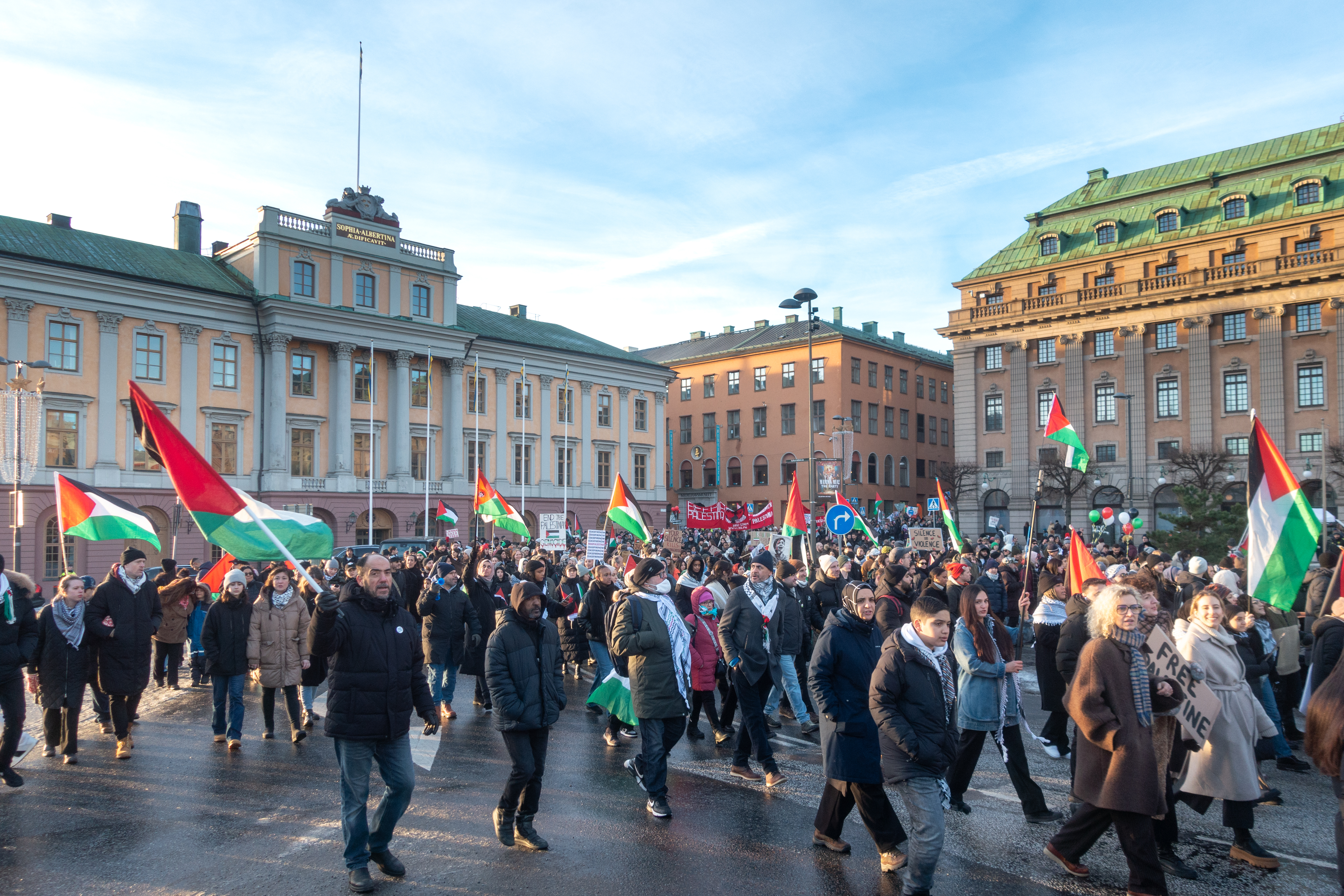
Demonstration in Stockholm, 27 January 2024.

This is a list of pro-Palestinian protests in Sweden including demonstrations, marches, sit-ins, direct actions, and campus encampments in support of Palestinian rights.

== List ==
Estimated attendance is either mentioned explicitly in the references or a midpoint is used, i.e., 50 when dozens are mentioned, 500 when hundreds are mentioned, and so on.

=== Pre-2023 ===
Date	City/town	Estimated attendance	Description	Ref(s)
7 March 2009	Malmö	6,000-7,000	Demonstration outside Baltiska Hallen tennis stadium against Israel's participation in a Davis Cup match against Sweden. Mayor of Malmö, Ilmar Reepalu, said he believed the game should not be played at all due to what he described as crimes against human rights committed by Israel in the conduct of the Gaza War. Ended with police intervention and riot against the police. 100 protesters were detained and ten were arrested.	
12 July 2014	Stockholm	500	Demonstration in the city center in protest of the Israeli attacks during Operation Protective Edge.	
20 July 2014	Stockholm	2,000	Demonstration at Medborgarplatsen. Ended with police intervention. Two protesters were arrested.	
11 May 2021	Stockholm	200	Demonstration outside the Israeli embassy and march through the city center. Ended with police intervention. One protester was arrested.	
11 May 2021	Gothenburg	200	Demonstration in the city center. Ended with police intervention.	
14 May 2021	Karlskoga	?	Demonstration in the city center. Ended with police intervention.	
15 May 2021	Gothenburg	?	Car and bicycle procession through the city center.	
15 May 2021	Stockholm	?	Car and bicycle procession through the city center. Ended with police intervention.	
15 May 2021	Karlstad	70	Demonstration in the city center. Ended with police intervention.	
15 May 2021	Malmö	100	Car and bicycle procession through the city center. Ended with police intervention.	
15 May 2021	Växjö	200	Demonstration in the city center.	
20 May 2021	Gothenburg	500	Demonstration and march through the city center. Ended with police intervention.	

=== 2023 ===
Date	City/town	Estimated attendance	Description	Ref(s)
7 October 2023	Helsingborg	?	Demonstration in the city center. Some participants celebrated the Hamas attacks.	
7 October 2023	Kristianstad	?	Car procession through the city center.	
7 October 2023	Malmö	?	Demonstration in the city center.	
7 October 2023	Växjö	?	Demonstration in the city center.	
14 October 2023	Malmö	1,500	Demonstration and march through the city center.	
28 October 2023	Gothenburg	600	Demonstration in the city center.	
28 October 2023	Stockholm	50,000	Demonstration and march through the city center.	
2 November 2023	Luleå	200	Demonstration in the city center.	
4 November 2023	Malmö	?	Demonstration outside a synagogue.	
5 November 2023	Gothenburg	2,000	Demonstration and march through the city center.	
5 November 2023	Malmö	3,500	Demonstration and march through the city center.	
5 November 2023	Stockholm	10,000	Demonstration and march through the city center.	

=== 2024 ===
Date	City/town	Estimated attendance	Description	Ref(s)
7 January 2024	Stockholm	50	Demonstration outside the US Embassy.	
28 January 2024	Helsingborg	?	Sit-in in the city center.	
28 January 2024	Gothenburg	?	Demonstration in the city center.	
28 January 2024	Malmö	?	Demonstration in the city center.	
28 January 2024	Stockholm	5,000	Demonstration in the city center.	
11 May 2024	Malmö	20,000	Demonstration outside the Eurovision arena in protest of Israel's participation in the Eurovision Song Contest 2024. Israeli singer Eden Golan was booed by the audience at a rehearsal. Ended with police intervention. Greta Thunberg was arrested.	
15 May 2024	Uppsala	?	Encampment at Uppsala University demanding that the university end all collaborations with Israeli institutions.	
7 June 2024	Stockholm	19	Occupation of a building of the Royal Institute of Technology. Activists barricaded themselves inside calling for the university to end collaboration with Israeli universities. Ended with police intervention. 19 protesters were arrested.	
16 November 2024	Stockholm	2,000	Demonstration and march through the city center.	

=== 2025 ===
Date	City/town	Estimated attendance	Description	Ref(s)
24 May 2025	Stockholm	5,000	Demonstration and march through the city center.	
7 June 2025	Stockholm	30,000-50,000	Demonstration and march through the city center.	
17 June 2025	Stockholm	15,000-20,000	Red line demonstration through the city center where participants wore red clothing.	
26 July 2025	Stockholm	100+	Demonstration in Odenplan square in Stockholm, urging the government to condemn Israel's actions in Gaza.	
10 August 2025	Stockholm	500	Demonstration in the city center against the Israeli plans to occupy Gaza City.	
16 August 2025	Stockholm	?	Demonstration commemorating the journalists murdered by Israel in Gaza.	
6 September 2025	Stockholm	500	Demonstration and march through the city center.	
2 October 2025	Stockholm	?	Demonstration outside the Ministry of Foreign Affairs. Ended with police intervention, including use of pepper spray. Four protesters were arrested. Two protesters were taken to the hospital.	
4 October 2025	Stockholm	?	Demonstration in the city center.	
25 October 2025	Stockholm	500	Demonstration and march through the city center.	
13 December 2025	Stockholm	500	Demonstration and march through the city center against Israel's ceasefire violations in Gaza.	
20 December 2025	Stockholm	500	Demonstration in the city center against the Israeli plans to annex the occupied West Bank.	
31 December 2025	Stockholm	500	Demonstration at Segels Torg Square and march toward the Swedish Parliament.	

=== 2026 ===
Date	City/town	Estimated attendance	Description	Ref(s)
3 January 2026	Stockholm	500	Demonstration and march through the city center against US strikes on Venezuela and Israeli attacks on Palestine.	
10 January 2026	Stockholm	500	Demonstration at Odenplan Square in solidarity with Venezuela and Palestine.	
24 January 2026	Stockholm	500	Demonstration and march through the city center.	
31 January 2026	Stockholm	500	Demonstration at Odenplan Square.	
7 February 2026	Stockholm	500	Demonstration and march through the city center to protest Israeli violations of the ceasefire in Gaza.	
28 March 2026	Stockholm	?	Demonstration in the city center.	
25 April 2026	Stockholm	500	Demonstration and march through the city center against Israel's violation of the ceasefire agreement.	
7 October 2026	Gothenburg	40	Demonstration in the city center.	

== See also ==
- Gaza war protests
- Boycott, Divestment, and Sanctions
- Lists of pro-Palestinian protests
