= Red line demonstrations =

2025 protests in Europe

2025 red line protests in Europe
- Part of Gaza war protests
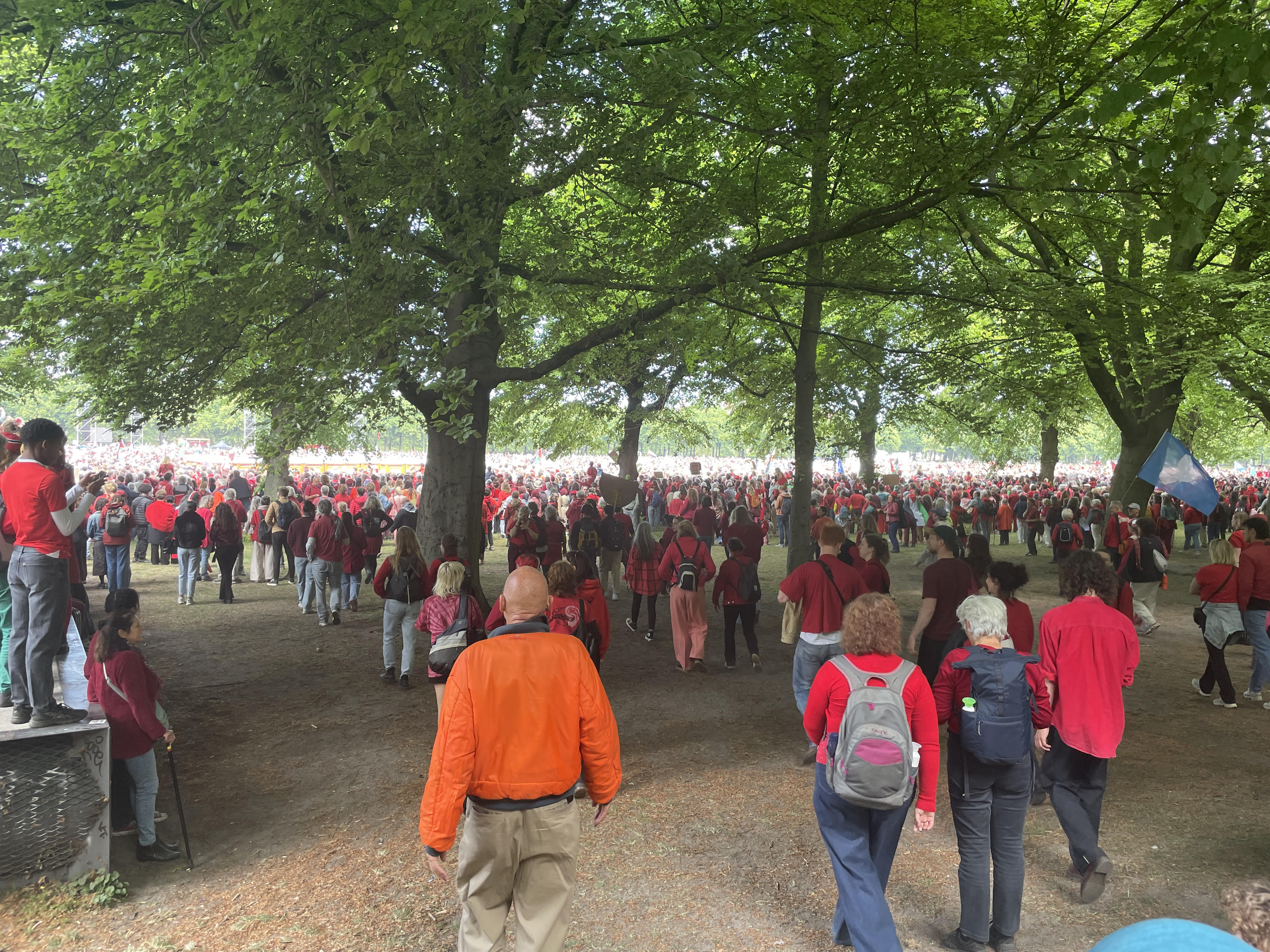
- Protesters in red clothing forming a "red line" near the Peace Palace, The Netherlands, 18 May 2025
- Date: 18 May – 5 October 2025
- Location: Europe (mainly The Netherlands, with solidarity actions in Brussels, London, Geneva)
- Caused by: Israeli military operations in Gaza; Governmental support for Israel; Alleged violations of international humanitarian law
- Goals: Sanctions against Israel; Suspension of EU-Israel Association Agreement; Ceasefire and humanitarian aid access in Gaza
- Methods: Peaceful marches; Symbolic red clothing; Speeches and cultural performances

The red line demonstrations were a series of major demonstrations in Europe, organized by a coalition of human rights groups and pro-Palestinian organizations to oppose Israel's genocide in Gaza and demand policy changes from governments in Belgium, The Netherlands, Sweden, and other countries. The protests on 18 May and 15 June 2025 drew over 100,000 and 150,000 participants respectively, marking the largest demonstrations in the Netherlands in two decades. Another protest in The Netherlands on 5 October 2025 drew an estimated 250,000 participants.

== Background ==
The protests emerged in response to Israel’s prolonged military campaign in Gaza (2023–2025), which had resulted in over 54,000 Palestinian deaths by June 2025 according to Gaza health officials. Organizers in the Netherlands including Amnesty International, Oxfam Novib, PAX, and Doctors Without Borders accused the Dutch government of failing to hold Israel accountable for alleged war crimes and genocide. The "red line" symbolism represented the boundary protesters believed the government should enforce against Israeli actions violating international law.

== Events ==
=== 18 May 2025 Hague demonstration ===
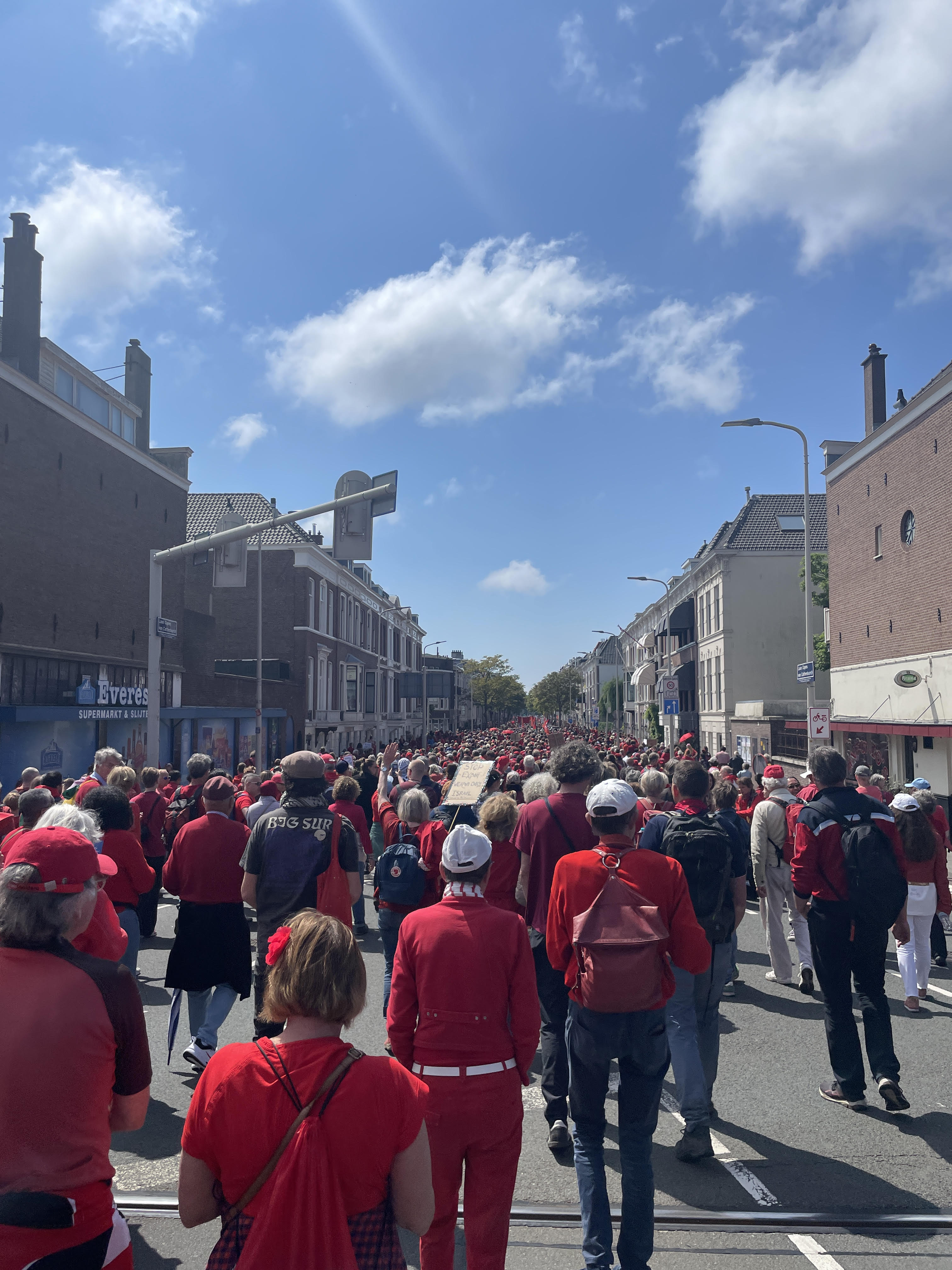
The first Hague demonstration was against the position of the Dick Schoof cabinet regarding the Gaza war, and called for wearing red clothing to draw a symbolic 'red line'.

The first protest on 18 May 2025 attracted approximately 100,000 participants wearing red clothing. Marchers formed a 5-kilometer human chain around The Hague's city center, passing the Peace Palace (home to the International Court of Justice) where South Africa’s genocide case against Israel was being heard. Speakers condemned Dutch political and military support for Israel, with Amnesty International's Marjon Rozema stating: "We demand an end to support as long as Israel blocks aid and commits war crimes".

=== 15 June 2025 Hague demonstration ===
Another follow-up protest in the Hague on 15 June 2025 saw organizers estimate 150,000 attendees, while police reported "tens of thousands". Protesters repeated the red-clad march route and added a solidarity action on Terschelling island, where 2,000 Oerol festival participants formed a red line on the beach. The demonstration coincided with the ongoing hearings of the International Court of Justice and increasing EU scrutiny of Israel’s actions.

=== 17 June 2025 Stockholm demonstration ===
In Sweden, 15,000-20,000 protesters gathered in a red line demonstration in Stockholm. Participants held signs with messages such as "Stop the genocide" and "Jews for justice & peace". The march was organized by, among other groups, Oxfam Sweden, Swedish Peace, Amnesty Sweden, Doctors Without Borders, and Kvinna till Kvinna.

=== 5 October 2025 Amsterdam demonstration ===
The largest red line demonstration occurred on 5 October 2025 drew an estimated 250,000 participants meeting at the Museumplein in Amsterdam and marching through the city center.

== Demands ==
Protesters called for:

- Immediate sanctions against Israeli officials
- Suspension of the EU-Israel Association Agreement
- Full arms embargo on Israel
- Humanitarian aid access to Gaza
- Recognition of Palestinian statehood

== Impact ==
Dutch Prime Minister Dick Schoof acknowledged protesters' "concerns and frustration" but emphasized backchannel diplomacy. Foreign Minister Caspar Veldkamp advocated for EU trade agreement review, while far-right leader Geert Wilders condemned protests as "Hamas support". On 14 June, Schoof announced potential support for EU sanctions against far-right Israeli ministers.

EU foreign policy chief Kaja Kallas announced formal review of EU-Israel relations on 12 June.

== See also ==
- Lists of pro-Palestinian protests
- Gaza war protests
- 2025 pro-Palestinian protests on university campuses in the Netherlands
- South Africa v. Israel (Genocide Convention)
