= List of pro-Palestinian protests in Ireland =

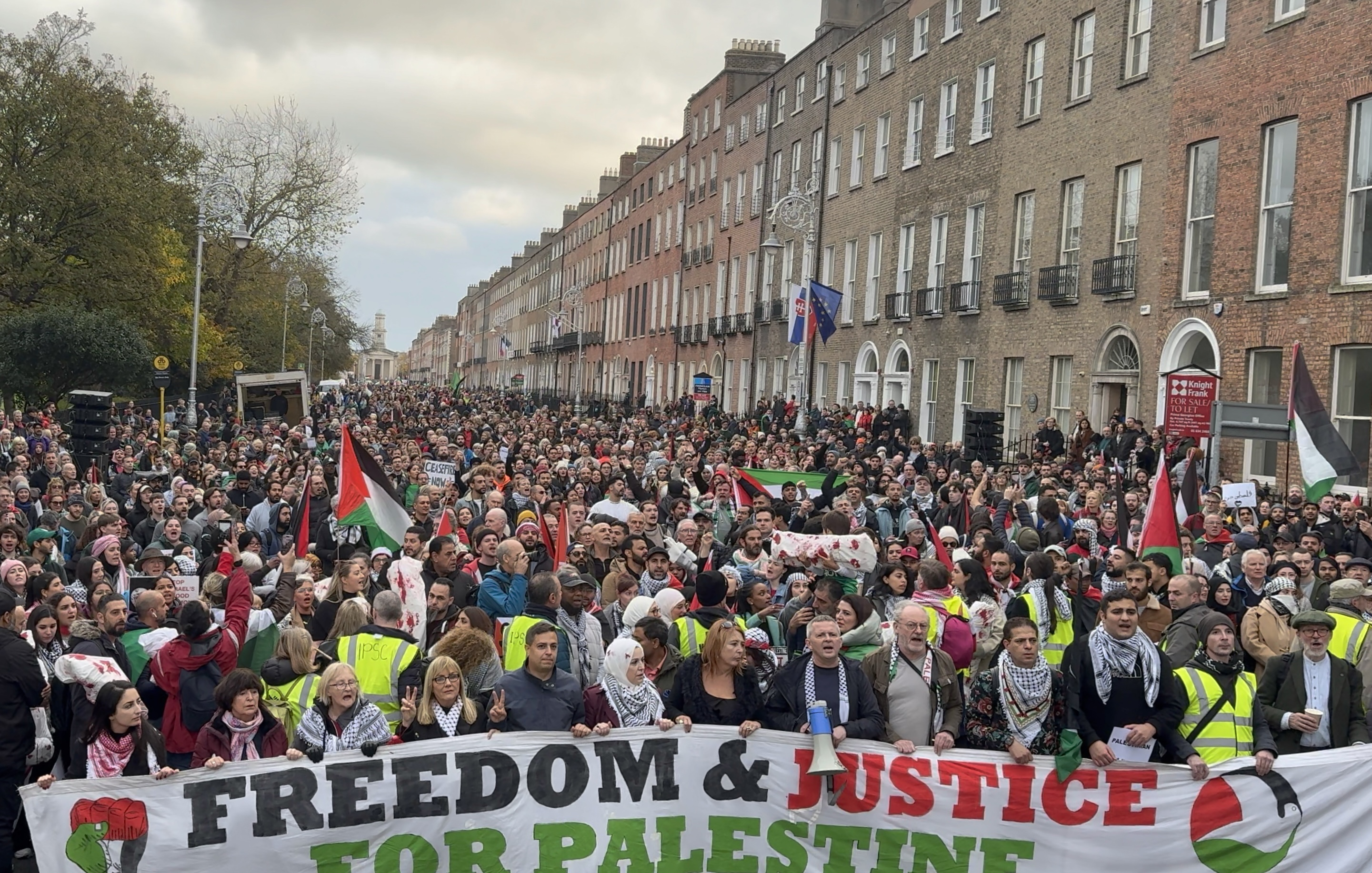
Pro-Palestine protest in Dublin, 18 November 2023

This is a list of pro-Palestinian protests in Ireland including demonstrations, marches, sit-ins, direct actions, and campus encampments in support of Palestinian rights.

== List ==
Estimated attendance is either mentioned explicitly in the references or a midpoint is used, i.e., 50 when dozens are mentioned, 500 when hundreds are mentioned, and so on.

=== Pre-2023 ===
Date	City/town	Estimated attendance	Description	Ref(s)
4 June 2005	Dublin	?	Demonstration during a FIFA World Cup qualifying match between Ireland and Israel.	
1 January 2009	Dublin	600	Demonstration outside Leinster House in protest of Israel's attacks on Gaza. One protester attempted to set himself on fire.	
26 July 2014	Dublin	?	Demonstration in the city centre and march to the Israeli Embassy.	
15 May 2021	Cork	?	Demonstration and march through the city centre.	
15 May 2021	Galway	?	Demonstration and march through the city centre.	
15 May 2021	Dublin	5,000	Demonstration in the city centre and march to the Israeli Embassy.	
22 May 2021	Cork	400	Demonstration and march through the city centre.	
19 September 2022	Dublin	?	Demonstration in front of Leinster House.	
25 September 2022	Dublin	50	Demonstration outside Tallaght Stadium against the participation of an Israeli football team.	

=== 2023 ===
Date	City/town	Estimated attendance	Description	Ref(s)
14 October 2023	Dublin	2,000	Demonstration and march through the city centre.	
19 October 2023	Dublin	?	Occupation of the European Parliament Liaison Office.	
21 October 2023	Dublin	1,000	Demonstration and march through the city centre.	
21 October 2023	Limerick	50,000	Demonstration and march through the city centre.	
17 November 2023	Ballina	?	Defacing of a mural of Joe Biden with red paint and writing "Genocide Joe".	
18 November 2023	Limerick	?	Demonstration and march through the city centre.	
18 November 2023	Dublin	5,000	Demonstration and march through the city centre.	
18 November 2023	Cork	1,000	Demonstration and march through the city centre.	
18 November 2023	Cork	?	Die-in outside the Cork City Hall.	
9 December 2023	Dublin	5,000	March through the city centre and die-in in front of Leinster House.	
12 December 2023	Dublin	100	Sit-in in front of US ambassador's residence. Ended with police intervention.	

=== 2024 ===
Date	City/town	Estimated attendance	Description	Ref(s)
13 January 2024	Dublin	5,000	Demonstration and march through the city centre.	
7 February 2024	Dublin	?	Demonstration in front of the US Embassy.	
18 February 2024	Kilkenny	?	Rally and kite-flying demonstration in solidarity with Palestine.	
3 May 2024	Dublin	?	Encampment at Trinity College Dublin and blocking of its library. Lasted until 8 May when the university announced it would cut ties with Israeli companies.	
11 May 2024	Dublin	100	Encampment at University College Dublin.	
14 May 2024	Cork	?	Encampment at University College Cork.	
20 July 2024	Dublin	5,000	Demonstration and march through the city centre.	
2 August 2024	Dublin	?	Silent march through the city centre.	
24 August 2024	Dublin	?	Demonstration in the city centre.	
31 August 2024	Dublin	25,000	Demonstration and march through the city centre.	
6 October 2024	Dublin	5,000	Demonstration and march through the city centre.	
7 October 2024	Dublin	?	Sit-in outside the US Embassy. Lasted until 9 November.	
9 November 2024	Dublin	5,000	Demonstration and march through the city centre.	
15 November 2024	Dublin	?	Demonstration and march through the city centre.	
16 November 2024	Dublin	?	Demonstration outside the German Embassy in protest of Germany's support for Israel.	

=== 2025 ===
Date	City/town	Estimated attendance	Description	Ref(s)
5 January 2025	Dublin	?	Silent march through the city centre.	
19 March 2025	Dublin	500	Sit-in on the O’Connell Bridge, blocking traffic.	
22 March 2025	Dublin	5,000	Demonstration and march through the city centre.	
3 April 2025	Dublin	?	Demonstration in front of Maple Shopping Centre.	
22 April 2025	Dublin	?	Occupation of the RTÉ campus. Ended with police intervention.	
17 May 2025	Dublin	10,000	Demonstration and march through the city centre.	
7 June 2025	Kilkenny	20	Picket line outside John McGuinness' constituency office.	
4 July 2025	Dublin	?	Demonstration outside US ambassador's residence in Phoenix Park. Some protesters chanted the slogan "Death to the IDF".	
19 July 2025	Dublin	10,000	Demonstration and march through the city centre.	
2 August 2025	Kilkenny	1,000-2,000	Demonstration and march through the city centre. Protesters displayed banners with messages such as "our government is complicit with genocide" and "stop killing children like me".	
9 August 2025	Waterford	500	Demonstration and march through the city centre.	
11 August 2025	Shannon	200+	Demonstration at Shannon Airport to protest against the airport's military use by the United States and to stop transportation of weapons to Israel.	
16 August 2025	Dublin	?	March by healthcare workers through the city centre.	
19 August 2025	Dublin	80	Demonstration in front of the Department of Foreign Affairs.	
23 August 2025	Galway	?	Demonstration with a 140ft long crochet blanket with 2300 squares each representing 10 Palestinian children killed by Israel.	
26 August 2025	Dublin	500	Demonstration in the city centre and march to the Department of Foreign Affairs.	
6 September 2025	Waterford	200	Demonstration and march through the city centre.	
6 September 2025	Navan	500	Demonstration and march through the town centre.	
6 September 2025	Cork	700	Demonstration and march through the city centre.	
6 September 2025	Dublin	10,000	Demonstration in front of the US Embassy and march to the Department of Foreign Affairs.	
13 September 2023	Dublin	2,000	March through the city centre by healthcare workers.	
20 September 2025	Dublin	?	Demonstration and march through the city centre as part of broader protests on housing and education.	
2 October 2025	Dublin	?	Blocking of traffic to the Dublin Port. Ended with police intervention.	
4 October 2025	Dublin	30-40	Blocking of traffic to the Dublin Port. Ended with police intervention, including use of tear gas. Two protesters were arrested.	
4 October 2025	Dublin	25,000	Demonstration and march through the city centre.	
2 November 2025	Dublin	150	Blocking of the Dublin Port. Protesters blocked the entrance of the port to disrupt the transport of materials, but still allowed the workers to leave.	
29 November 2025	Dublin	1,000+	Demonstration and march through the city centre, with more than 170 organisations took part of the protest.	
27 December 2025	County Donegal	?	Demonstration at the Croithli Bridge, West Donegal.	

=== 2026 ===
Date	City/town	Estimated attendance	Description	Ref(s)
24 January 2026	Dublin	1,000	Demonstration in the city center, with protesters demanded action and sanctions against Israel by the central government.	
21 February 2026	Dublin	1,000+	March in the city centre organised by the Ireland-Palestine Solidarity Campaign (IPSC), with it being concluded at Leinster House.	
10 October 2026	Dublin	10,000+	Demonstration and march from the Garden of Remembrance to the Dáil Éireann in the city centre.	
11 November 2026	Dublin	?	Several people joined a pro-Palestine demonstration to protest against former President Joe Biden's visit to Trinity College Dublin, with protestors waves Palestinian flags and chanted "Blood on your hands". Three men were arrested by police after threw objects at Biden. Two of them were later released wothout charges while the third man was charged and ordered to appear in court.	
12 November 2026	Dublin	50–60	Demonstration at the city centre. Two people were arrested for public order offences.	
12 November 2026	Dublin	1,000+	Demonstration and march from the Spire of Dublin to the National Gallery of Ireland, where the European Political Community summit was held.	

== See also ==
- Boycott, Divestment and Sanctions
- Gaza war protests
- Lists of pro-Palestinian protests
