= List of pro-Palestinian protests in Austria =

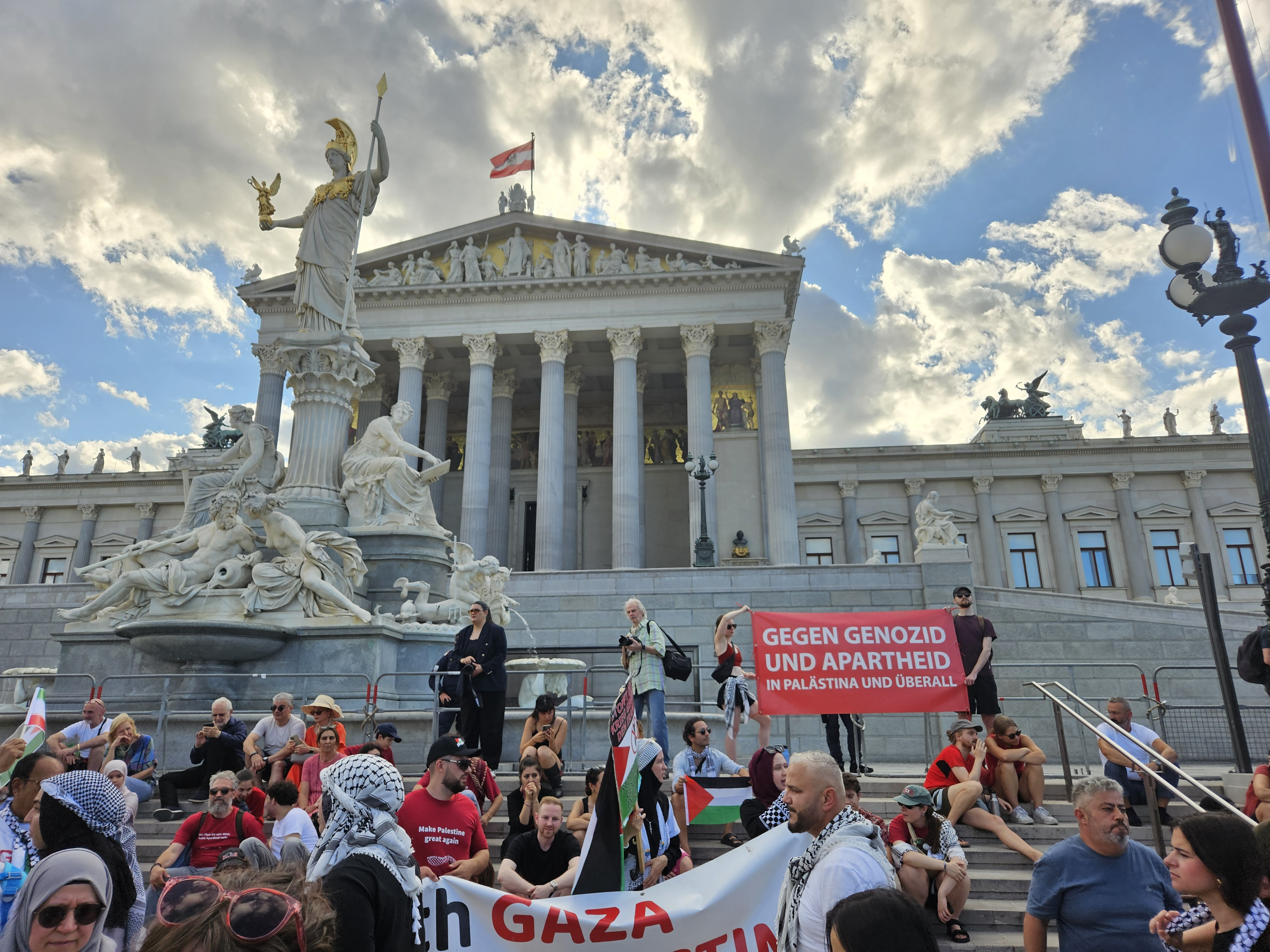
Demonstration in Vienna, 28 June 2025.

This is a list of pro-Palestinian protests in Austria including demonstrations, marches, sit-ins, direct actions, and campus encampments in support of Palestinian rights.

== List ==
Estimated attendance is either mentioned explicitly in the references or a midpoint is used, i.e., 50 when dozens are mentioned, 500 when hundreds are mentioned, and so on.

=== Pre-2023 ===
Date	City/town	Estimated attendance	Description	Ref(s)
20 July 2014	Vienna	11,000-30,000	Demonstration and march through the city center.	
8 December 2017	Vienna	?	Demonstration in front of the US Embassy in solidarity with Palestine and against Trump's recognition of Jerusalem as capital of Israel.	
12 May 2021	Vienna	?	Demonstration in the city center.	

=== 2023 ===
Date	City/town	Estimated attendance	Description	Ref(s)
11 October 2023	Vienna	500	Night vigil in the city center. Ended with police intervention. 304 protesters were filled charges at by the police.	
13 October 2023	Graz	30	Demonstration in the city center. One protester was arrested.	
13 October 2023	Vienna	300	Demonstration in the city center. Protesters chanted "Let Gaza live, let Gaza be free" and "Israel is a terrorist".	
20 October 2023	Graz	70-80	Demonstration in the city center. Ended with police intervention.	
21 October 2023	Vienna	5,000	Demonstration and march through the city center.	
28 October 2023	Salzburg	200-300	Demonstration in the city center.	
26 November 2023	Graz	1,200	Demonstration at Europaplatz and march through the city center.	

=== 2024 ===
Date	City/town	Estimated attendance	Description	Ref(s)
13 January 2024	Graz	?	Demonstration and march through the city center as part of the "global day of action".	
13 January 2024	Innsbruck	?	Demonstration and march through the city center as part of the "global day of action".	
13 January 2024	Salzburg	?	Demonstration and march through the city center as part of the "global day of action".	
13 January 2024	Vienna	1,000-2,000	Demonstration and march through the city center as part of the "global day of action".	
3 February 2024	Vienna	?	Silent march through the city center.	
9 May 2024	Vienna	?	Attempt at encampment at the Vienna University of Technology. Ended with police intervention. Three protesters were arrested.	
29 May 2024	Vienna	30-100	Sit-in in front of the Vienna University of Technology. Ended with police intervention. 16 protesters were arrested.	
29 June 2024	Vienna	50	Demonstration and march through the city center.	
10 September 2024	Vienna	?	Demonstration outside the Austrian Parliament Building against the visit of Israeli speaker of the Knesset Amir Ohana.	
13 October 2024	Salzburg	200	Demonstration and march through the city center.	
7 December 2024	Dornbirn	?	Demonstration in the city center.	
7 December 2024	Graz	?	Demonstration in the city center.	
7 December 2024	Innsbruck	?	Demonstration in the city center.	
7 December 2024	Klagenfurt am Wörthersee	?	Demonstration in the city center.	
7 December 2024	Linz	?	Demonstration in the city center.	
7 December 2024	Salzburg	?	Demonstration in the city center.	
7 December 2024	Wiener Neustadt	?	Demonstration in the city center.	
7 December 2024	Vienna	200	Demonstration and march through the city center.	

=== 2025 ===
Date	City/town	Estimated attendance	Description	Ref(s)
10 June 2025	Vienna	15	Demonstration outside the Israeli Embassy in response to Israel's interception of the Madleen Flotilla. Ended with police intervention. Eight protesters were arrested.	
18 July 2025	Salzburg	?	Disruption of the opening ceremony of the Salzburg Festival. Protesters unfurled banners saying "stop the genocide" and "food is a right, not a weapon".	
21 August 2025	Vienna	?	Occupation of the Austrian public broadcaster's ORF building accusing its coverage "enabling the genocide". Ended with police intervention. Six protesters were arrested.	
20 September 2025	Vienna	3,000-3,500	Demonstration and march through the city center.	
11 October 2025	Vienna	500-5,000	Demonstration and march through the city center.	

=== 2026 ===
Date	City/town	Estimated attendance	Description	Ref(s)
28 March 2026	Vienna	?	Demonstration in the city center.	
12 May 2026	Vienna	12	A dozen people staged a demonstration by the Palestine Solidarity Austria, ahead of the first semifinal of the 2026 Eurovision Song Contest, calling for Israel's ban from the competition.	

== See also ==
- Gaza war protests
- Boycott, Divestment, and Sanctions
- Lists of pro-Palestinian protests
