= List of pro-Palestinian protests in Germany =

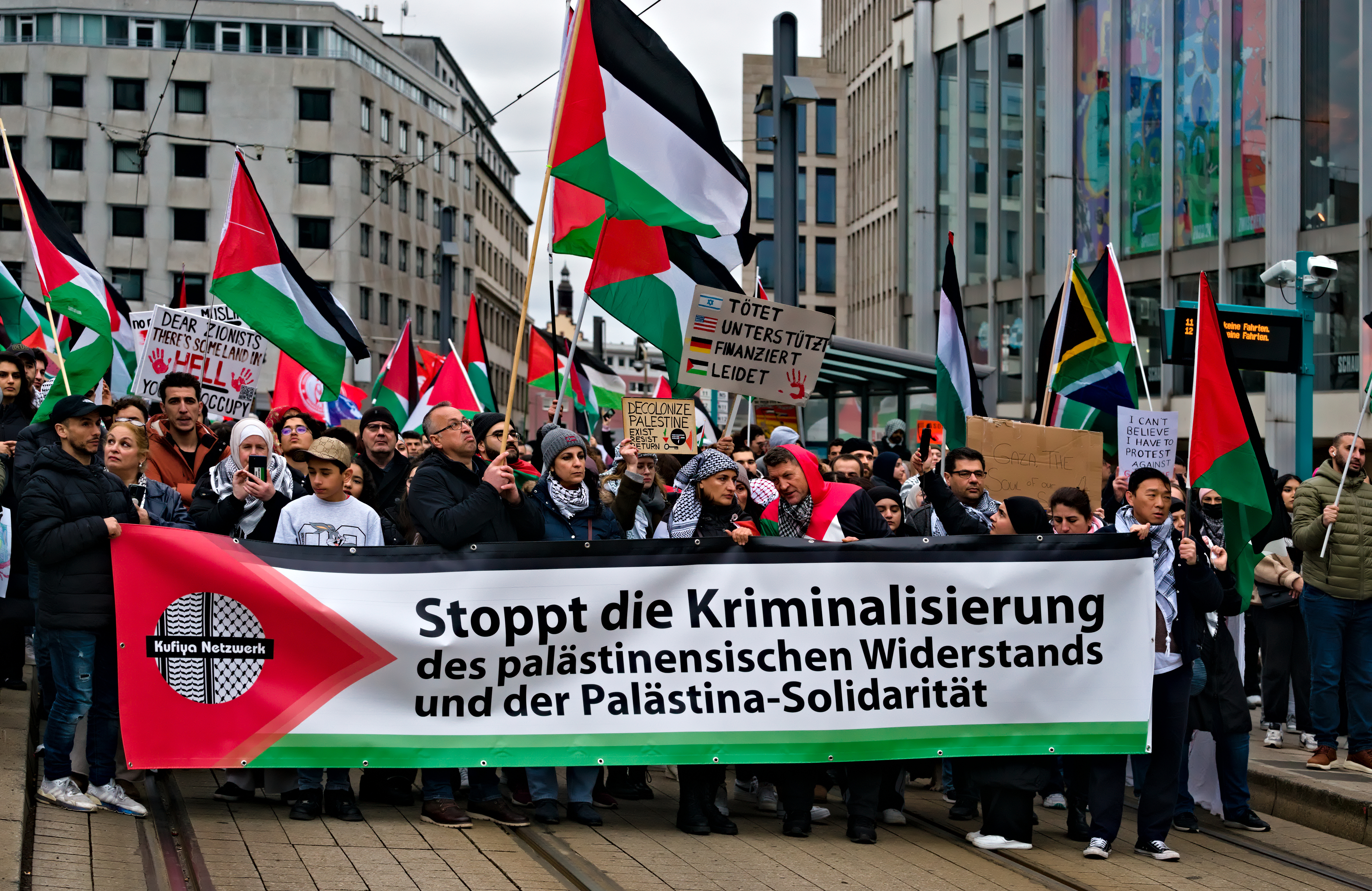
March in Frankfurt, 3 February 2024.

This is a list of pro-Palestinian protests in Germany including demonstrations, marches, sit-ins, direct actions, and campus encampments in support of Palestinian rights.

== List ==
Estimated attendance is either mentioned explicitly in the references or a midpoint is used, i.e., 50 when dozens are mentioned, 500 when hundreds are mentioned, and so on.

=== Pre-2023 ===
Date	City/town	Estimated attendance	Description	Ref(s)
30 December 2008	Berlin	2,000	Protest against Israeli's Operation Cast Lead on Gaza.	
25 July 2014	Berlin	1,100	Demonstration and march through the city center on Al-Quds Day.	
26 July 2014	Frankfurt	400	Demonstration and march through the city center.	
26 July 2014	Berlin	1,000	Demonstration and march through the city center.	
1 August 2014	Berlin	?	Demonstration in the city center.	
9 August 2014	Berlin	?	Demonstration and march through the city center.	
21 October 2015	Berlin	?	Demonstration in the city center.	
23 December 2017	Berlin	?	Protest in solidarity with Palestine and against Trump's recognition of Jerusalem as capital of Israel.	
1 June 2019	Berlin	?	Demonstration and march through the city center on Al-Quds Day.	
15 May 2021	Stuttgart	+50	Demonstration in the city center. Ended with police intervention.	
15 May 2021	Leipzig	400	Demonstration in the city center. About 200 pro-Israel counter-protesters were also present.	
15 May 2021	Hamburg	400-500	Demonstration in the city center. Ended with police intervention when counter-protesters carrying Israeli flags appeared.	
15 May 2021	Mannheim	500	Demonstration in the city center. One protester was arrested for burning an Israeli flag.	
15 May 2021	Freiburg im Breisgau	600	Demonstration and march through the city center.	
15 May 2021	Hanover	800	Demonstration in the city center.	
15 May 2021	Berlin	2,500–6,000	Demonstration in Neukölln district during Nakba Day. Ended with police intervention.	
15 May 2021	Cologne	800	Demonstration in the city center before broken up by police.	
15 May 2021	Frankfurt	2,500	Demonstration in the city center.	
23 April 2022	Berlin	500	Demonstration and march through the city center. Ended with police intervention. Two protesters were arrested.	
15 May 2022	Berlin	?	Demonstration in the city center despite the ban on pro-Palestinian protests. Ended with police intervention. Several protesters were arrested and injured.	

=== 2023 ===
Date	City/town	Estimated attendance	Description	Ref(s)
13 October 2023	Hamburg	200	Demonstration at the main train station. Ended with police intervention.	
15 October 2023	Berlin	1,000	Demonstration at Potsdamer Platz. Ended with police intervention, with over 800 police officers being deployed. 155 protesters were arrested.	
22 October 2023	Berlin	?	Demonstration in the city center. Ended with police intervention, with over 1,600 police officers being deployed. 232 protesters were arrested.	
25 October 2023	Hamburg	800	Demonstration in the city center. Ended with police intervention, with over 1,500 police officers being deployed.	
11 November 2023	Berlin	5,000	Demonstration and march through the city center.	
18 November 2023	Berlin	4,000	Demonstration and silent march from the Mitte district towards Hofjägerallee in the Tiergarten district.	
25 November 2023	Frankfurt	500	Demonstration and march through the city center.	
17 December 2023	Berlin	3,000	Vehicle convoy through the city center.	

=== 2024 ===
Date	City/town	Estimated attendance	Description	Ref(s)
21 January 2024	Berlin	150	Demonstration as part of a larger anti-far right protest. Pro-Palestinian protesters were pushed away by other demonstrators and eventually separated by the police.	
24 February 2024	Berlin	500	Demonstration and march through the city center.	
3 May 2024	Berlin	?	Sit-in at the Humboldt University of Berlin. Ended with police intervention. Several protesters were detained.	
7 May 2024	Leipzig	50-60	Occupation of a hall at Leipzig University. Ended with police intervention. Thirteen protesters had criminal proceedings held against them.	
7 May 2024	Berlin	150	Encampment at the courtyard of the Free University of Berlin. Ended with police intervention. Several protesters were detained.	
16 May 2024	Berlin	300	Demonstration by students and staff of the Free University of Berlin, in protest of the recent crackdown on Palestine supporters at universities.	
15 July 2024	Berlin	600	Demonstration in the city center. Ended with police intervention. Seven demonstrators and 17 police officers were hurt, and 28 demonstrators were charged.	
25 July 2024	Berlin	?	Demonstration in the city center. Protesters recreated an Israeli bombardment of Gaza.	
5 October 2024	Berlin	?	Demonstration and march through the city center.	
5 October 2024	Düsseldorf	500	Demonstration and march through the city center.	
6 October 2024	Berlin	?	Demonstration in the city center.	
6 October 2024	Hamburg	950	Demonstration in the city center in solidarity with Palestine and Lebanon.	
7 October 2024	Frankfurt	?	Demonstration in the city center despite the city's ban of the protest.	
23 November 2024	Berlin	500	Demonstration at Leopold Square in Wedding.	

=== 2025 ===
Date	City/town	Estimated attendance	Description	Ref(s)
13 January 2025	Bielefeld	1	Disruption of Chancellor Scholz's campaign speech.	
5 February 2025	Berlin	?	Demonstration at Potsdamer Platz in protest of Trump's Gaza plan.	
15 February 2025	Munich	?	Demonstration outside Munich Security Conference as part of a larger protest against NATO.	
16 April 2025	Berlin	40-60	Occupation of a building at the Humboldt University in Berlin and support demonstration outside. Ended with police intervention. Five protesters were arrested, four being at risk of being deported.	
15 May 2025	Berlin	1,100	Demonstration in Kreuzberg to commemorate the 77th anniversary of the Nakba and to protest against Israel's military operation in Gaza. Ended with police intervention. Over 50 protesters were arrested. Several protesters and police officers were injured.	
24 May 2025	Berlin	1,000	Demonstration at Oranienplatz.	
30 August 2025	Frankfurt	5,000	Demonstration and march through the city center.	
10 September 2025	Berlin	200	Demonstration in Mitte district. Ended with police intervention. Eight protesters were arrested. A protester, a member of the Irish Bloc Berlin, was assaulted by the police, being punched in the face and having an arm broken by an officer. The incident was later condemned by the Irish Taoiseach, Micheál Martin.	
13 September 2025	Berlin	20,000	Demonstration and march through the city center, demanding to an end of the genocide in Gaza. Over video, Roger Waters addressed the crowd saying "The vast, vast majority of ordinary people all over the globe are demanding an end to the unspeakable crime that Israel is committing".	
27 September 2025	Berlin	60,000–100,000	Demonstration and march from Berlin's City Hall towards a rally at the Grosser Stern. Protesters called for an end to military cooperation with Israel.	
2 October 2025	Multiple	?	51 demonstrations in 38 German cities calling for an end to the ongoing Israeli offensive in Palestine.	
2 October 2025	Berlin	?	Demonstration outside the Foreign Ministry. Four protesters were arrested for defacing a wall of the ministry with red paint.	
3 October 2025	Saarbrücken	?	Demonstration in the city center.	
7 October 2025	Berlin	?	Demonstration in the city center. Ended with police intervention.	
11 October 2025	Berlin	5,000	Demonstration and march through the city center.	
7 November 2025	Hamburg	40	Blocking of the Port of Hamburg for several hours. Protesters chained themselves to railway tracks in protest of the government's arms exports to Israel.	
8 November 2025	Hamburg	2,000	Demonstration and march through the city center.	
11 November 2025	Munich	?	Demonstration during Fenerbahce v Maccabi Tel Aviv basketball match. Protesters held a large banner reading "can't play ball on rubble".	
13 November 2025	Berlin	6	Occupation of the roof of the Brandenburg Gate. The protesters unfurled a banner calling for an end to German support for Israel. Ended with police intervention. Six protesters were arrested.	

=== 2026 ===
Date	City/town	Estimated attendance	Description	Ref(s)
17 January 2026	Leipzig	1,400	Anti-fascist and anti-Zionist demonstration.	
7 March 2026	Berlin	1	Disruption of a speech by Chancellor Merz. The protester held a sign with the message "Yes to international law, Never again Staatsräson (raison d’etat), Long live Palestine" and chanted slogans in support of the Palestine. Merz responded that "we stand with Israel".	
25 March 2026	Berlin	4	Occupation of the roof of the Rheinmetall arms factory in Berlin-Gesundbrunnen. Ended with police intervention.	
28 March 2026	Berlin	?	Demonstration at the Potsdamer Square to protest against the US and Israeli attacks on Palestine, Iran and Lebanon, as part of the Palestinian Land Day commemorations.	
5 April 2026	Berlin	500-700	Demonstration and march through the city center in solidarity with Palestine, Lebanon, Iran, and Sudan.	
6 April 2026	Osnabrück	?	Demonstration in the city center against Volkswagen's plan to produce weapons and military equipment for Israel.	
8 April 2026	Berlin	?	Demonstration at Alexanderplatz in protest of Israel's death penalty law against Palestinians.	
10 April 2026	Berlin	7	Blocking of the entrance to the Rheinmetall weapons factory. Ended with police intervention. The protesters were detained.	
15 May 2026	Halle (Saale)	50	Demonstration at Leipzig Tower in Halle (Saale) to commemorate the Nakba and the protestors demanded the government to recognise Palestine as a state, accused of Israel of genocide as well as calling for an academic boycott against Israel.	
16 May 2026	Berlin	2,000	Demonstration in Kreuzberg, Berlin to commemorate the Nakba. The organizers stated that at least 30 people were injured and 15 protestors were temporarily detained by police.	
16 May 2026	Hamburg	1,100	Demonstration in the city center to commemorate the Nakba.	
13 July 2026	Berlin	40	Around 40 protestors, including Swedish activist Greta Thunberg, gathered and glued themselves outside of the Rheinmetall AG's office, accusing the company of complicity in the genocide in Gaza and to protest against Rheinmetall's defense contractor's arms contracts with Israel.	
10 October 2026	Berlin	3,500	Demonstration in the city centre.	

== See also ==
- Gaza war protests
- Boycott, Divestment, and Sanctions
- Censorship of pro-Palestinian expression in German culture
- Lists of pro-Palestinian protests
