= List of pro-Palestinian protests in Cyprus =

Preparations for a pro-Palestinian demonstration at North Nicosia, 2025.

This is a list of pro-Palestinian protests in Cyprus including demonstrations, marches, sit-ins, direct actions, and campus encampments in support of Palestinian rights.

== List ==
Estimated attendance is either mentioned explicitly in the references or a midpoint is used, i.e., 50 when dozens are mentioned, 500 when hundreds are mentioned, and so on.

=== Pre-2023 ===
Date	City/town	Estimated attendance	Description	Ref(s)
21 July 2014	Nicosia	500	Demonstration outside the Israeli embassy.	

=== 2023 ===
Date	City/town	Estimated attendance	Description	Ref(s)
15 October 2023	Larnaca	250	Demonstration and march through the city center.	
19 October 2023	Nicosia	?	March from the Pasydy union building towards the Grivas Dighenis Avenue, close to the Israeli embassy.	
20 October 2023	Nicosia	1,000-2,000	Demonstration and march through the city center. It was attended by MPs, mayors, the general secretary of AKEL, and the Palestinian ambassador to Cyprus.	

=== 2024 ===
Date	City/town	Estimated attendance	Description	Ref(s)
14 January 2024	Akrotiri	300	Protest outside at the UK's RAF Akrotiri base after the base was used to launch airstrikes on Gaza and Yemen. The protesters carried a banner demanding a "Ceasefire" while another read "Stop funding genocide".	
29 September 2024	Akrotiri	200	Protest outside at the UK's RAF Akrotiri base after the base was used to launch airstrikes on Gaza.	
5 October 2024	Limassol	?	Protest titled "75 + 1 years of Genocide" on Independence Avenue. Two Israeli disrupters were arrested after allegedly making offensive gestures and verbally abusing protesters.	

=== 2025 ===
Date	City/town	Estimated attendance	Description	Ref(s)
24 February 2025	Nicosia	?	Demonstration at Eleftheria square and march through the city center. Protesters demanded a ceasefire in Gaza and a cut to all ties with Israel.	
5 May 2025	Nicosia	1	Hunger strike by activist Louis Allan from an olive tree at the Ayiou Prokopiou roundabout in Engomi. Lasted until 10 May.	
26 May 2025	Nicosia	500	Demonstration outside the Presidential Palace accusing the government of President Nikos Christodoulides of supporting Israel.	
6 June 2025	Limassol	?	Disruption of a Municipal Counsil meeting, demanding the condemnation of the genocide in Gaza, cutting ties with Israeli investors, and renounce the relationship with Haifa, its twin city.	
15 June 2025	Limassol	500	March through the city center.	
14 August 2025	Nicosia	?	Demonstration held in the city to protest against the killing of journalists in the Gaza war by Israeli forces.	
28 September 2025	Nicosia	?	March through the city center.	
2 October 2025	Nicosia	500	Demonstration outside the Ministry of Foreign Affairs to protest Israel's interception of the Global Sumud Flotilla. Ended with riot police intervention, including the use of pepper spray.	
12 October 2025	Paphos	?	Demonstration in the town hall square.	

=== 2026 ===
Date	City/town	Estimated attendance	Description	Ref(s)
18 May 2026	Nicosia	?	Demonstration outside the Presidential Palace against Israel's latest interception of the Global Summud Flotilla.	
21 May 2026	Limassol	?	Protest outside Limassol Castle against the governments inaction in helping the boats on the Global Summud Flotilla after they sent distress signals.	
29 June 2026	Nicosia	150	Demonstration outside the Presidential Palace in protest of the Gaza Board of Peace meeting being held in Ayia Napa.	
11 September 2026	Nicosia	?	Demonstration outside the Presidential Palace against a visit by Israeli President Isaac Herzog.	

== See also ==
- Gaza war protests
- Boycott, Divestment, and Sanctions
- Lists of pro-Palestinian protests
