= List of pro-Palestinian protests in Denmark =

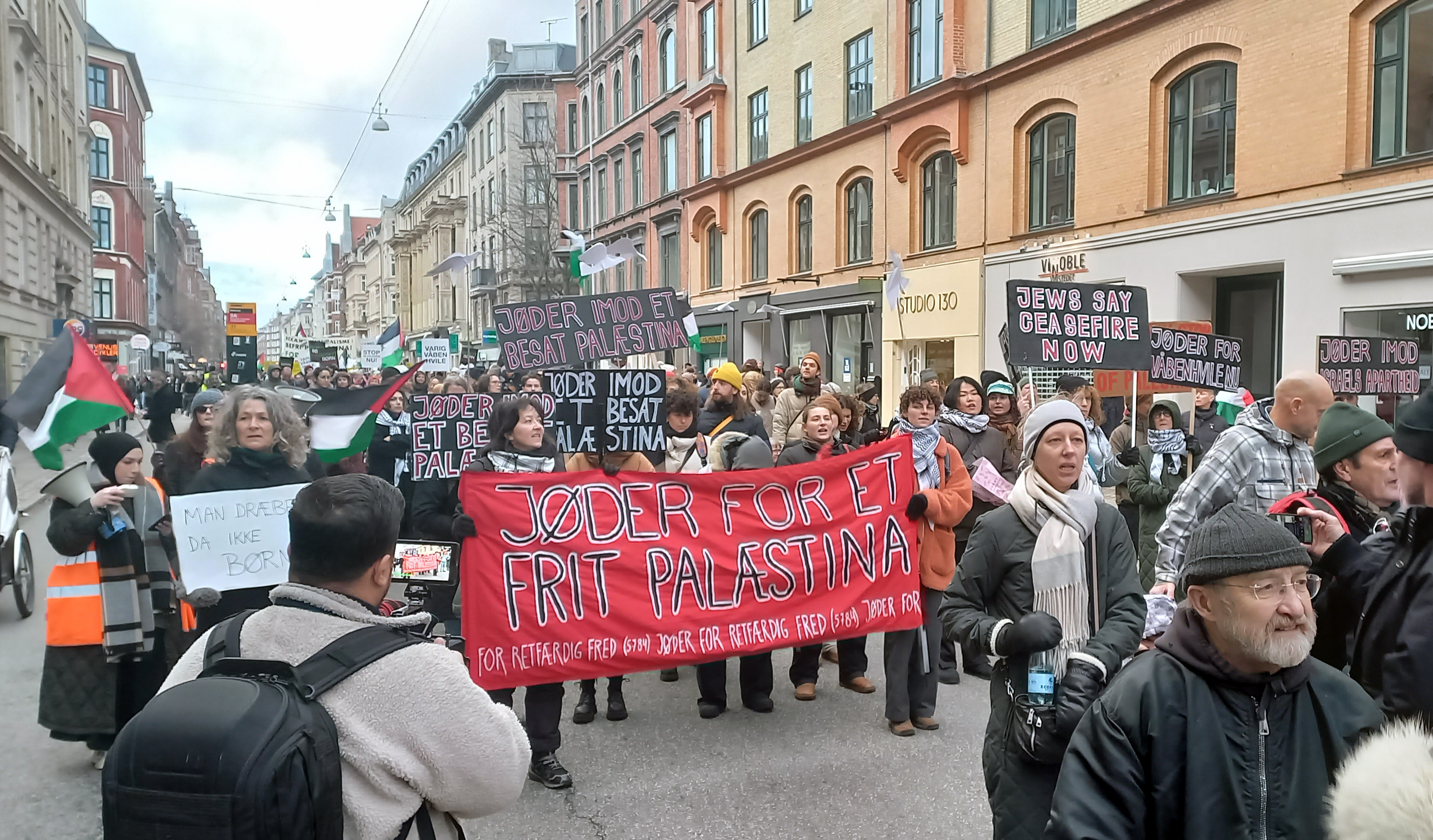
"Jews for a free Palestine" banner in Copenhagen, 3 February 2024

This is a list of pro-Palestinian protests in Denmark including demonstrations, marches, sit-ins, direct actions, and campus encampments in support of Palestinian rights.

== List ==
Estimated attendance is either mentioned explicitly in the references or a midpoint is used, i.e., 50 when dozens are mentioned, 500 when hundreds are mentioned, and so on.

=== Pre-2023 ===
Date	Municipality	Estimated attendance	Description	Ref(s)
3 January 2009	Copenhagen	2,000-3,000	Demonstration in the city center in protest of Israel's attacks on Gaza.	
21 May 2016	Copenhagen	?	Demonstration at the Torvehallerne market.	
29 June 2016	Copenhagen	?	Demonstration near Nørrebro railway station. Protesters called for the boycott of Israeli products.	
6 March 2017	Copenhagen	?	Demonstration outside the Ministry of Defence against the government purchasing of weapons from Israeli arms manufacturer Elbit Systems.	
21 May 2017	Copenhagen	?	Demonstration in the city center on the occasion of the 69 years of the Nakba.	
19 December 2020	Copenhagen	?	Demonstration outside the US embassy. Protesters also showed solidarity for Sahrawi people.	
14 May 2021	Copenhagen	5,000	Demonstration outside the Israeli embassy. Ended with police intervention, including tear gassing children and elderly. Several protesters were injured by the police, including some bitten by police dogs.	
5 June 2021	Copenhagen	1,500-2,000	Demonstration in the city center.	

=== 2023 ===
Date	Municipality	Estimated attendance	Description	Ref(s)
22 October 2023	Copenhagen	?	Demonstration and march through the city center.	
23 October 2023	Aalborg	250	Torchlight procession and demonstration at Toldbod Plads.	
23 November 2023	Copenhagen	?	Demonstration and march through the city center.	

=== 2024 ===
Footage of ceasefire demonstration in Copenhagen, 3 February 2024

Date	Municipality	Estimated attendance	Description	Ref(s)
2 February 2024	Copenhagen	?	Demonstration and march through the city center.	
6 May 2024	Copenhagen	100	Encampment at the University of Copenhagen. Lasted until 2 June, after the university declared that it would no longer have investments in companies active in the illegally occupied Israeli territories in the West Bank.	
7 May 2024	Copenhagen	200	Demonstration at the University of Copenhagen as part of the ongoing occupation.	
6 October 2024	Copenhagen	?	Demonstration and march through the city center. Protesters also showed solidarity for Lebanese victims of Israel's incursion into Lebanese territory.	

=== 2025 ===
Date	Municipality	Estimated attendance	Description	Ref(s)
9 May 2025	Copenhagen	?	Disruption of an event at Copenhagen Opera House which is financed by Maersk, a company that transports weapons to Israel.	
16 May 2025	Aalborg	?	Demonstration and march through the city center.	
17 May 2025	Copenhagen	5,000	Demonstration and march through the city center.	
18 June 2025	Copenhagen	?	Demonstration outside the Christiansborg Palace.	
24 August 2025	Copenhagen	10,000	Demonstration and march through the city center. The protest was attended by about 100 humanitarian organizations, as well as unions, and activists such as Greta Thunberg.	
1 October 2025	Copenhagen	?	Demonstration outside the Christiansborg Palace in protest of a two-day European Union summit, which the protesters accuse of being complicit in Israel's genocide of Palestinians.	
3 October 2025	Aarhus	?	Momentary blocking of traffic and later demonstration in the city center.	
1 December 2025	Copenhagen	?	Defacing of windows of Maersk headquarters.	

== See also ==
- Gaza war protests
- Boycott, Divestment, and Sanctions
- Lists of pro-Palestinian protests
