= List of pro-Palestinian protests in Spain =

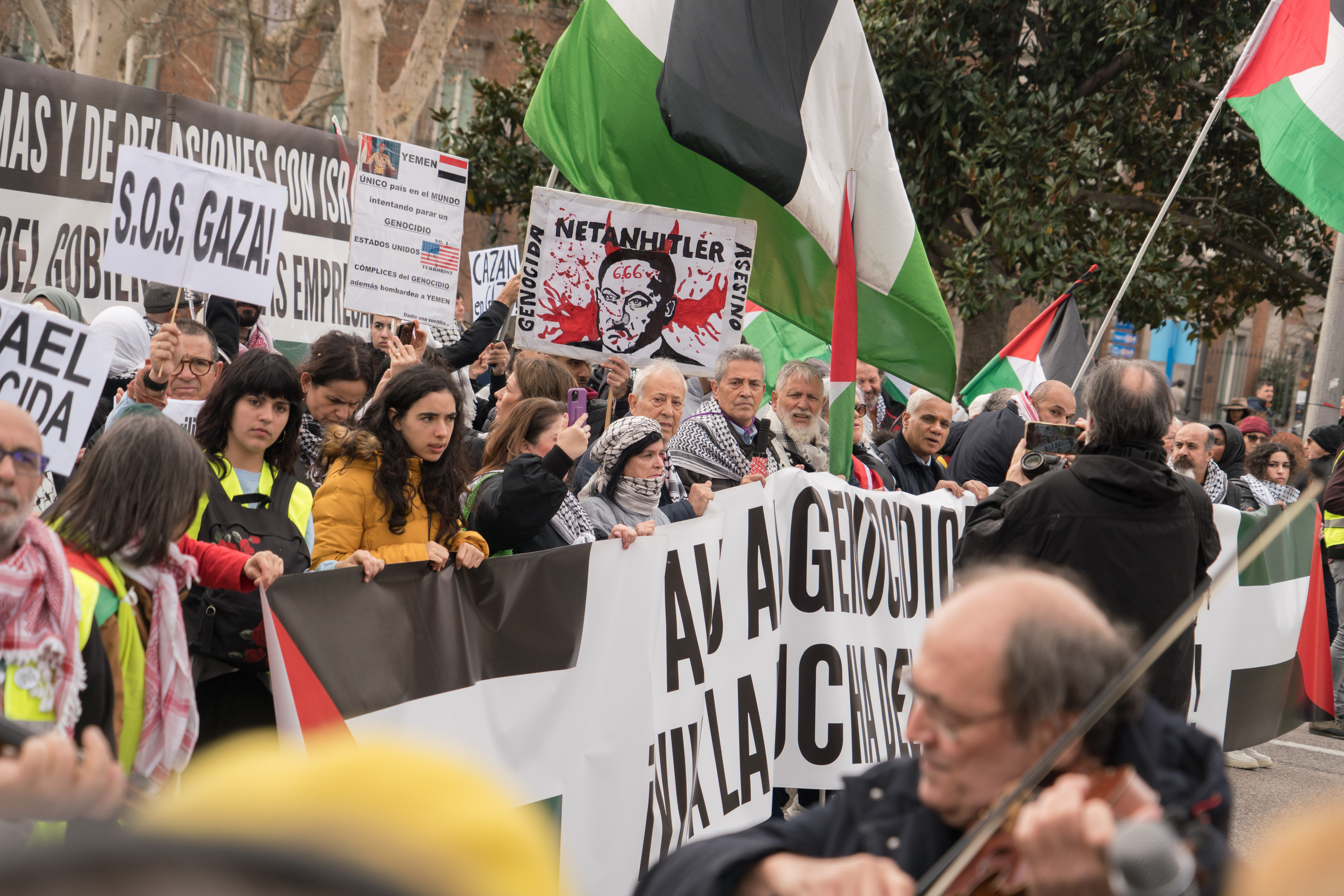
Pro-Palestinian protest in Madrid, 25 February 2024.

This is a list of pro-Palestinian protests in Spain including demonstrations, marches, sit-ins, direct actions, and campus encampments in support of Palestinian rights.

== List ==
Estimated attendance is either mentioned explicitly in the references or a midpoint is used, i.e., 50 when dozens are mentioned, 500 when hundreds are mentioned, and so on.

=== Pre-2023 ===
Date	Municipality	Estimated attendance	Description	Ref(s)
10 January 2009	Seville	4,000	Demonstration and march through the city center.	
10 January 2009	Madrid	5,000	Demonstration and march through the city center.	
10 January 2009	Barcelona	30,000	Demonstration and march through the city center.	
9 August 2014	Bilbao	500	Demonstration outside the Guggenheim Museum.	
13 December 2017	Bilbao	?	Demonstration and march through the city center.	
28 November 2020	Bilbao	500	Demonstration and march through the city center.	
15 May 2021	Madrid	2,500	Demonstration and march through the city center. Protesters chanted "This is not a war, it's a genocide".	
30 March 2021	Bilbao	50	Demonstration in the city center for the 45th anniversary of the commemoration of Palestinian Land Day.	
29 April 2021	Bilbao	?	Demonstration in the city center in protest of Israel's army detainment of Spanish citizen Juana Ruiz Sánchez in the West Bank.	
15 May 2021	Madrid	5,000	Demonstration in the city center.	
21 May 2021	Bilbao	?	Demonstration and march through the city center against Israel's violence amid the 2021 Israel–Palestine crisis.	
15 November 2021	Bilbao	?	Demonstration in front of the Arriaga Theater against the performance of Israeli singer Noa.	
6 May 2022	Bilbao	50	Counter-demonstration against around 500 Hapoel Holon B.C. hooligans. Lasted until 11 May.	

=== 2023 ===
Date	Municipality	Estimated attendance	Description	Ref(s)
9 October 2023	Madrid	500	Demonstration in the city center.	
13 October 2023	Barcelona	?	Demonstration in the city center.	
14 October 2023	Bilbao	?	Demonstration and march through the city center.	
15 October 2023	Madrid	10,000	Demonstration and march through the city center.	
18 October 2023	Madrid	500	Demonstration in front of the Israeli Embassy.	
21 October 2023	Barcelona	70,000	Demonstration and march through the city center.	
28 October 2023	Bilbao	5,000	Demonstration and march through the city center.	
28 October 2023	Madrid	35,000	Demonstration and march through the city center.	
29 October 2023	Valencia	1,000	Demonstration and march through the city center.	
4 November 2023	Valencia	?	Demonstration and march through the city center.	
16 November 2023	Madrid	?	Student demonstration in the city center.	
29 November 2023	Valencia	3,500	Demonstration and march through the city center.	
8 December 2023	Guernica	3,000	Demonstration in the town center. Participants formed a human mosaic representing the Palestinian flag.	

=== 2024 ===
Date	Municipality	Estimated attendance	Description	Ref(s)
20 January 2024	Barcelona	?	Demonstration in the city center.	
20 January 2024	Valencia	?	Demonstration in the city center.	
20 January 2024	Madrid	50,000	Demonstration and march through the city center.	
27 January 2024	Madrid	20,000	Demonstration and march through the city center.	
17 February 2024	Madrid	5,000	Demonstration and march through the city center. At least six ministers from Prime Minister Pedro Sanchez’s cabinet took part in the protest.	
29 April 2024	Valencia	50	Encampment at the University of Valencia. Lasted until 17 May. Ended with protesters disbanding on their own.	
6 May 2024	Barcelona	500	Encampment at the University of Barcelona. Lasted until 24 May. Ended with protesters disbanding on their own, when protesters had all of their demands met by the university.	
11 May 2024	Bilbao	500	Demonstration in the city center. Six protesters climbed the facade of the NYX Hotel and unfurled a large pro-Palestinian banner.	
11 May 2024	Madrid	4,000	Demonstration and march through the city center.	
13 May 2025	Madrid	200	Encampment at the campus of the Complutense University of Madrid.	
14 May 2024	Valencia	?	Sit-in at the University of Valencia as part of the ongoing encampment. Ended with police intervention.	
15 May 2024	Bilbao	?	Demonstration at the University of the Basque Country.	
15 May 2024	Bilbao	500	Demonstration in the city center.	
19 May 2024	Valencia	?	Demonstration in the city center.	
28 May 2024	Barcelona	?	Encampment at the Bellaterra campus of the Autonomous University of Barcelona. Lasted until 6 June. Ended with protesters disbanding on their own.	
13 June 2024	Barcelona	?	Encampment at Plaza Universitat. Lasted until the early hours of 14 June. Ended with police intervention. More than 15 protesters were fined.	
6 August 2024	Bilbao	?	Die-in in near the Guggenheim Museum.	
27 September 2024	Barcelona	4,500	Strikes, picketing, and marches through the city center.	
27 September 2024	Madrid	6,000	Strikes, picketing, and marches through the city center.	
5 October 2024	Bilbao	5,000	Demonstration and march through the city center.	

=== 2025 ===
Date	Municipality	Estimated attendance	Description	Ref(s)
14 January 2025	Madrid	?	Demonstration against the arrival of the Maccabi Tel Aviv basketball team.	
22 February 2025	Madrid	1,000	Noise demonstration in front of the US Embassy.	
30 April 2025	Bilbao	?	Demonstration in front of the Bilbao Metro headquarters against the hiring of an Israeli security company.	
10 May 2025	Madrid	50,000	Demonstration and march through the city center.	
13 May 2025	Madrid	50	Encampment at the campus of the Complutense University of Madrid.	
21 May 2025	Barcelona	100	Encampment at the Bellaterra campus of the Autonomous University of Barcelona.	
4 June 2025	Barcelona	?	Occupation of the rectorate of the Autonomous University of Barcelona. Lasted about 7 hours, when protesters had all of their demands met by the university.	
14 June 2025	Valencia	?	Demonstration and march through the city center.	
14 June 2025	Barcelona	25,000	Demonstration and march through the city center.	
26 June 2025	Bilbao	500	Demonstration and march through the city center.	
12 August 2025	Valencia	?	Demonstration and march through the city center against the killing of journalists.	
27 August 2025	Barcelona	1,000	Demonstration in the city center.	
9 September 2025	Madrid	?	Demonstration in the city center.	
11 September 2025	Valencia	?	Sit-in at the La Nau building of the University of Valencia. Lasted until 15 September, when protesters reached a "satisfactory agreement" with the university.	
13 September 2025	Valencia	500	Demonstration and march through the city center.	
14 September 2025	Madrid	100,000	Disruption of the final stage of the Vuelta a España as protesters overturned metal barriers and occupied the road. Police could not contain the demonstrators. Two protesters were arrested.	
18 September 2025	Madrid	1,500	Demonstration and march through the city center.	
19 September 2025	San Sebastián	2,000	Demonstration outside the San Sebastián International Film Festival.	
20 September 2025	Madrid	?	Demonstration outside Reina Sofia Museum by health care workers.	
21 September 2025	Madrid	?	Demonstration outside the Health Ministry by health care workers.	
23 September 2025	Valencia	300	Demonstration at the Port of Valencia against the docking of a Maersk ship carrying components for the F-35 jets used in the Gaza bombings.	
2 October 2023	Barcelona	500	Demonstration outside the Israeli Consulate in response to Israel's interception and kidnapping of activists on board of the Global Sumud Flotilla.	
3 October 2025	Barcelona	70,000	Demonstration and march through the city center.	
4 October 2025	Valencia	10,000	Demonstration and march through the city center.	
4 October 2025	Madrid	92,000	Demonstration and march through the city center.	
7 October 2025	Barcelona	500	Demonstration and march through the city center. Met with police intervention. Six protesters were arrested. Several activists were injured including three police officers.	
12 October 2025	Madrid	20	Demonstration at Museo Reina Sofia. Protesters held signs with the message "stop genocide" in front of the Guernica painting.	
15 October 2025	Barcelona	7,300	Blocking of traffic in the city center, around Plaça de la Universitat as part of the general strike in solidarity with Palestine. Protesters clashed with the police, with several demonstrators damaged McDonald’s and Burger King restaurants in the city. 15 protesters were arrested.	

=== 2026 ===
Date	Municipality	Estimated attendance	Description	Ref(s)
14 March 2026	Madrid	4,500–5,000+	Thousands of demonstrators joined a pro-Palestinian and anti-war rally in central Madrid.	
22 March 2026	Valencia	1,000+	Demonstration calling for an end to the conflict in the Middle East.	
22 March 2026	Madrid	4,000	Demonstration against military escalations of the US, NATO, and Israel.	
28 March 2026	Madrid	?	Demonstration and march to commemorate the Palestinian Land Day.	
17 May 2026	Madrid	1,300	Demonstration and march from Atocha to Callao to commemorate the 78th anniversary of the Nakba, under the slogan "No Nakba, No Genocides, No War, No Censorship". Organised by RESCOP, the Asociación Hispano-Palestina Jerusalén, BDS Madrid and No Somos Delito, among others.	
24 May 2026	Bilbao	2,000	Demonstration to protest against Israel's treatment of activists from the Global Sumud Flotilla.	

== See also ==
- Gaza war protests
- Boycott, Divestment, and Sanctions
- Lists of pro-Palestinian protests
