= List of pro-Palestinian protests in Malta =

This is a list of pro-Palestinian protests in Malta including demonstrations, marches, sit-ins, direct actions, and campus encampments in support of Palestinian rights.

== List ==
Estimated attendance is either mentioned explicitly in the references or a midpoint is used, i.e., 50 when dozens are mentioned, 500 when hundreds are mentioned, and so on.

=== Pre-2023 ===
Date	City/town	Estimated attendance	Description	Ref(s)
6 January 2009	Valletta	200	March through the city center by members of the Muslim community in protest of 2009 Israel's attacks on Gaza.	
5 June 2010	Valletta	200	March through the city center in response to the attacks of the Israeli army on the Gaza Freedom Flotilla which killed 10 humanitarian workers and injured dozens of others.	
6 July 2014	Valletta	?	Demonstration outside the Parliament House in protest of the government's support for Israel's bid for a seat on the United Nations Security Council.	

=== 2023 ===
Date	City/town	Estimated attendance	Description	Ref(s)
14 October 2023	Msida	?	Demonstration at Msida Square.	
17 October 2023	Valletta	200	Demonstration outside the Parliament House calling for an end to Israel's genocide of Palestinians.	
21 October 2023	Valletta	?	Die-in outside the Parliament House.	
4 November 2023	Valletta	5,000	March through the city center.	
2 December 2023	Valletta	?	March through the city center.	

=== 2024 ===
Date	City/town	Estimated attendance	Description	Ref(s)
3 February 2024	Mellieħa	?	Demonstration organized by Movement Graffitti and Youth for Palestine, as well as joined by the Embassy of the State of Palestine in Malta at Għadira Bay to protest against the rising death toll from Israel's attacks in Gaza.	
6 October 2024	Valletta	500	Demonstration through the city center in protest of Israel's attacks on Palestine and Lebanon.	
16 November 2024	Attard	?	Protest outside the United States Embassy in Ta' Qali demanding an immediate embargo on Israel.	

=== 2025 ===
Date	City/town	Estimated attendance	Description	Ref(s)
30 March 2025	Valletta	?	Demonstration at St George’s Square to demand the imposition of sanctions on Israel.	
5 April 2025	Paola	?	Demonstration organized by Moviment Graffitti, Ġustizzja għall-Palestina, Watermelon Warriors, Lebanese Advocates, and Youth for Palestine in the Tony Bezzina Stadium to protest against a rugby match between Malta and Israel.	
17 May 2025	Gżira	500	Demonstration in the town center on occasion of the 77 years of the Nakba.	
17 May 2025	Sliema	500	Demonstration in the town center on occasion of the 77 years of the Nakba.	
29 July 2025	Valletta	?	March from Tritons' Fountain to the outside of the Parliament. Protesters demanded the Maltese government's recognition of the State of Palestine.	
8 August 2025	Valletta	?	Demonstration outside the Parliament House. Protesters projected images of Gaza's destruction and demanded of Israel's actions, including the cancellation of the EU-Israel Association Agreement.	
24 August 2025	St. Julian's	?	Demonstration outside the Hilton Hotel against an Israeli-affiliated medical conference being held there.	
2 October 2025	Valletta	?	Demonstration to protest against Israel's detention of flotilla activists from the Global Sumud Flotilla.	
5 October 2025	Valletta	?	Demonstration in front of Auberge de Castille in Valletta.	

=== 2026 ===
Date	City/town	Estimated attendance	Description	Ref(s)
21 February 2026	Valletta	500	March through the city center in protest of Israel's participation in the Eurovision Song Contest and calling for Malta to boycott the contest.	
30 March 2026	Valletta	?	Demonstration outside of Auberge de Castille to commemorate Land Day.	
5 October 2026	Valletta	?	Demonstration where protesters from over 20 organizations handed out letters to MPs urging trade restrictions on Israel.	

== See also ==
- Gaza war protests
- Boycott, Divestment, and Sanctions
- Lists of pro-Palestinian protests
