= List of pro-Palestinian protests in Belgium =

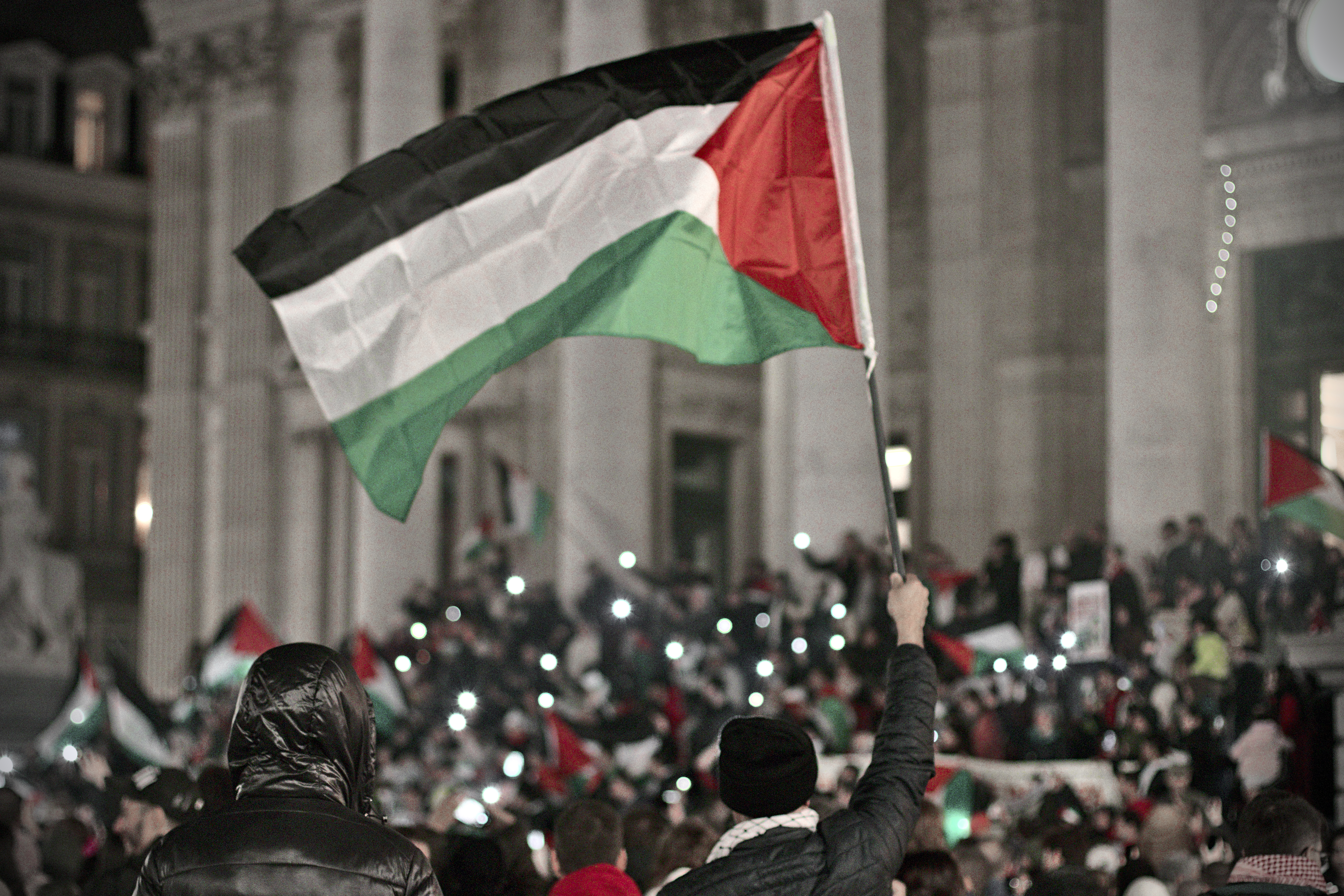
Pro-Palestinian gathering in Brussels, 28 October 2023.

This is a list of pro-Palestinian protests in Belgium including demonstrations, marches, sit-ins, direct actions, and campus encampments in support of Palestinian rights.

== List ==
Estimated attendance is either mentioned explicitly in the references or a midpoint is used, i.e., 50 when dozens are mentioned, 500 when hundreds are mentioned, and so on.

=== Pre-2023 ===
Date	Municipality	Estimated attendance	Description	Ref(s)
15 May 2013	Brussels	30	Die-in outside the Directorate-General for Research and Innovation in protest of Belgian participation in research programs collaborating with Israeli arms companies.	
12 August 2014	Sint-Niklaas	150	Silent vigi at the Regentieplein in response to the recent wave of Israeli attacks amid the 2014 Gaza War.	
18 August 2014	Brussels	5,000	Demonstration and march through the city center against the blockade of Gaza.	
5 September 2014	Lokeren	130	Silent vigil at the Markt in response to the recent wave of Israeli attacks amid the 2014 Gaza War.	
11 December 2017	Brussels	200	Demonstration in the European Quarter against the visit of Israeli Prime Minister Benjamin Netanyahu.	
5 April 2018	Brussels	200	Demonstration at Brussels Central Station in response to the 2018 Land Day protests where the Israeli army killed 18 Palestinian protesters and injured over 1,400.	
12 May 2021	Brussels	500	Demonstration outside the Ministry of Foreign Affairs in response to the escalation of Israel's attacks amid the 2021 Israel–Palestine crisis.	
15 May 2021	Brussels	3,000	Demonstration and march through the city center.	
16 May 2021	Antwerp	500	Demonstration in the city center.	
19 May 2021	Brussels	500	Demonstration in front of European Union Commission in response to Israel's attacks on Al-Aqsa Mosque, East Jerusalem and the Gaza Strip.	
29 October 2022	Brussels	1,000	Demonstration and march through the city center.	

=== 2023 ===
Date	Municipality	Estimated attendance	Description	Ref(s)
11 October 2023	Brussels	3,000	Demonstration outside the Ministry of Foreign Affairs.	
22 October 2023	Genk	800	Demonstration and march through the city center.	
22 October 2023	Brussels	12,000-40,000	Demonstration at the Schuman Square.	
28 October 2023	Mechelen	?	Demonstration and march through the city center.	
11 November 2023	Brussels	45,000	Demonstration and march through the city center.	
18 December 2023	Ghent	750	Night march through the city center.	
18 December 2023	Brussels	27,000	Demonstration and march through the city center.	

=== 2024 ===
Date	Municipality	Estimated attendance	Description	Ref(s)
21 January 2024	Brussels	500	Demonstration and march through the city center.	
17 March 2024	Brussels	7,500	Demonstration and march through the city center.	
6 May 2024	Ghent	200	Encampment at the Ghent University.	
19 May 2024	Brussels	5,000	Demonstration and march through the city center.	
31 May 2024	Brussels	500	Demonstration outside the US embassy. Ended with police intervention. Around 30 protesters were arrested.	
22 June 2024	Ghent	2,000	Demonstration and march through the city center.	
15 July 2024	Brussels	100	Demonstration outside the Israeli embassy. Ended with police intervention, including the use of tear gas on around 50 protesters.	
25 July 2024	Brussels	14	Demonstration outside the Tomorrowland event. Ended with police intervention. 14 protesters were arrested.	
25 August 2024	Ghent	200	Demonstration at Korenlei and Leie river. Activists unfurled a large flag from the St. Michael's bridge.	
17 September 2024	Ghent	?	Defacing of windows of an BNP Parbibas office in protest of alleged ties with Israeli arms producer Elbit Systems.	
20 October 2024	Brussels	32,000-70,000	Demonstration and march through the city center.	
24 November 2024	Ghent	1,500	Demonstration and march through the city center.	

=== 2025 ===
Date	Municipality	Estimated attendance	Description	Ref(s)
11 January 2025	Antwerp	1,000	Demonstration at the Waterpoort in protest of the role of the Port of Antwerp in the arms trade with Israel.	
26 January 2025	Brussels	7,000-13,000	Demonstration and march through the city center.	
11 May 2025	Brussels	80,000	Demonstration and march through the city center.	
24 May 2025	Ghent	4,000	Demonstration and march through the city center.	
15 June 2025	Brussels	110,000	Demonstration and march through the city center.	
23 June 2025	Brussels and Tournai	1,000	Around a thousand activists staged blockades against the advanced materials company Syensqo at the headquarters in the outskirts of Brussels and an OIP Sensor Systems warehouse in Tournai.	
22 July 2025	Brussels	300-400	Demonstration and march through the city center. Protesters chanted slogans such as "Free Palestine" and "Boycott Israel, boycott USA".	
24 August 2025	Brussels	500	Demonstration and march through the city center. A person was stabbed and taken to the hospital. The suspect was arrested.	
7 September 2025	Brussels	70,000-120,000	Demonstration and march through the city center.	
2 October 2025	Brussels	4,500	Demonstration outside the Ministry of Foreign Affairs.	
8 October 2025	Brussels	600	Demonstration outside the Ministry of Foreign Affairs in response to Israel's interception and kidnapping of activists on board of the Global Sumud Flotilla and in response to the suicide of a Palestinian refugee and activist that was being held at the 127bis closed center.	
10 October 2025	Ixelles	400	March by students from 6 different schools.	
11 October 2025	Charleroi	400	Blocking of the entrance to the Industeel Belgium, part of the ArcelorMittal group, in response to a delivery of several tons of steel to the Israeli Ministry of Defense. Ended with police intervention. Around 100 protesters were arrested.	
19 October 2025	Brussels	50	Encampment outside the European Commission.	
23 October 2025	Brussels	?	Strike by students and academic staff at the Vrije Universiteit Brussel to demand universities to end collaborations with Israeli institutions.	
27 October 2025	Antwerp	?	Demonstration at Suikerrui. Ended with police intervention. 20 protesters were arrested.	
10 November 2025	Antwerp	150–700	Demonstration at the Grote Markt. Ended with police intervention, including the use of water cannons. Seven protesters were arrested.	

=== 2026 ===
Date	Municipality	Estimated attendance	Description	Ref(s)
11 January 2026	Antwerp	300–500	Demonstration and march in the city center, organized by the Antwerp Coalition for Palestine.	
18 March 2026	Brussels	?	Demonstration at the Etterbeek campus of the Free University of Brussels calling for the university to stop collaborating with an Israeli defense-linked company.	
22 April 2026	Ghent	100+	Over a hundred pro-Palestine activists occupied on the Coupure campus of Ghent University, demanding a boycott of Israeli institutions.	
8 May 2026	Ghent	?	Blocking of the UFO building of Ghent University where a meeting of the Board of Directors were to take place.	
17 May 2026	Brussels	1,000+	Demonstration from Brussels-North railway station to Brussels-Central railway station, denouncing the war in Gaza, condemning Europe's complicity and commemorating the Nakba.	

== See also ==
- Gaza war protests
- Boycott, Divestment, and Sanctions
- Lists of pro-Palestinian protests
