= List of pro-Palestinian protests in Finland =

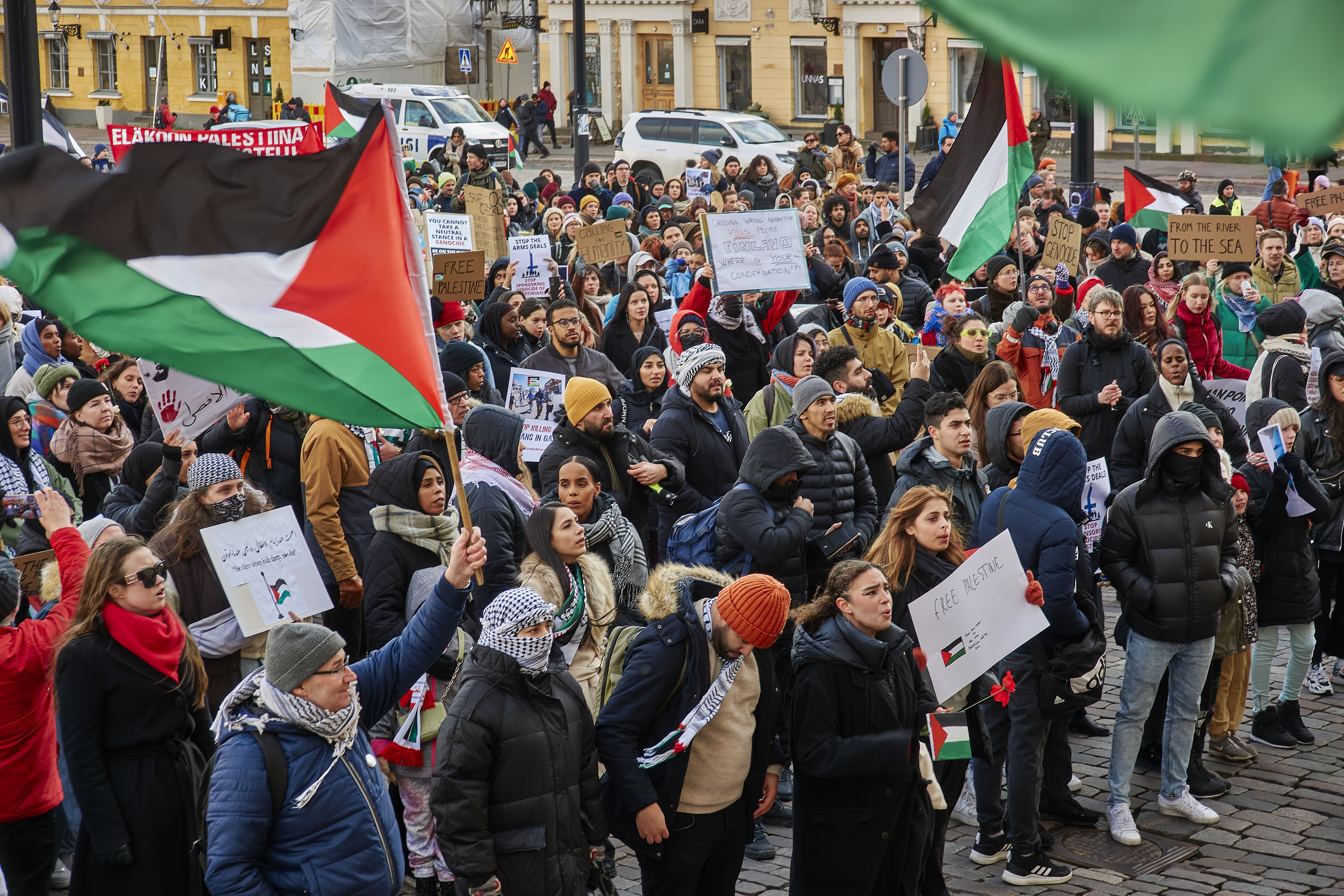
Pro-Palestinian gathering in Helsinki, 21 October 2023.

This is a list of pro-Palestinian protests in Finland including demonstrations, marches, sit-ins, direct actions, and campus encampments in support of Palestinian rights.

== List ==
Estimated attendance is either mentioned explicitly in the references or a midpoint is used, i.e., 50 when dozens are mentioned, 500 when hundreds are mentioned, and so on.

=== Pre-2023 ===
Date	City/town	Estimated attendance	Description	Ref(s)
16 May 2021	Helsinki	500	Demonstration and march through the city center amid the 2021 Israel–Palestine crisis.	

=== 2023 ===
Date	City/town	Estimated attendance	Description	Ref(s)
9 October 2023	Helsinki	500	Demonstration in the city center.	
13 October 2023	Helsinki	500	Demonstration in front of the Israeli Embassy.	
18 October 2023	Helsinki	?	Demonstration in front of the Helsinki Central Station against bombing of Al-Ahli Baptist Hospital.	
20 October 2023	Helsinki	800-1,000	Demonstration and march through the city center.	
11 November 2023	Helsinki	2,500-3,000	Demonstration in the city center.	
17 November 2023	Helsinki	?	Demonstration at the University of Helsinki.	
19 November 2023	Helsinki	4,000	Demonstration and march through the city center. Protesters also called for an end to Israeli military action in Gaza and criticized the Finnish government's agreement to purchase a missile defense system from Israel.	
29 November 2023	Espoo	?	Demonstration at the Aalto University.	
29 November 2023	Helsinki	200	Demonstration inside the main building of the University of Helsinki. Ended with police intervention. 13 protesters were arrested.	
6 December 2023	Helsinki	10	Disruption of commemorations of the Independence Day.	
20 December 2023	Helsinki	?	Demonstration in the city center.	
20 December 2023	Oulu	?	Demonstration in the city center.	
20 December 2023	Vaasa	40	Demonstration in the city center.	
20 December 2023	Jyväskylä	100	Demonstration in the city center.	

=== 2024 ===
Date	City/town	Estimated attendance	Description	Ref(s)
6 May 2024	Helsinki	50	Encampment at the University of Helsinki. Lasted until at least 13 June. Ended with police intervention.	
15 May 2024	Helsinki	?	Demonstration inside the main building of the University of Helsinki as part of the ongoing encampment there. Ended with police intervention.	
5 October 2024	Hämeenlinna	?	Demonstration in the city center.	
5 October 2024	Joensuu	?	Demonstration in the city center.	
5 October 2024	Jyväskylä	?	Demonstration in the city center.	
5 October 2024	Kuopio	?	Demonstration in the city center.	
5 October 2024	Oulu	?	Demonstration in the city center.	
5 October 2024	Rovaniemi	?	Demonstration in the city center.	
5 October 2024	Tornio	?	Demonstration in the city center.	
5 October 2024	Vaasa	?	Demonstration in the city center.	
5 October 2024	Tampere	150	Demonstration in the city center.	
5 October 2024	Helsinki	500	Demonstration and march through the city center.	

=== 2025 ===
Date	City/town	Estimated attendance	Description	Ref(s)
5 May 2025	Helsinki	50	Blocking of the entrance to the office of Maersk. Ended with police intervention. Three protesters were arrested.	
15 May 2025	Helsinki	?	Demonstration at the University of Helsinki. Ended with police intervention.	
24 May 2025	Helsinki	?	Demonstration in the city center.	
26 May 2025	Helsinki	30	Demonstration in front of the Israeli Embassy. Ended with police intervention.	
23 August 2025	Helsinki	?	Demonstration in the city center.	
19 September 2025	Helsinki	700-800	Demonstration and march through the city center.	
2 October 2025	Tampere	?	Demonstration and march through the city center.	
2 October 2025	Helsinki	?	Demonstration and march through the city center.	

== See also ==
- Gaza war protests
- Boycott, Divestment, and Sanctions
- Lists of pro-Palestinian protests
