= List of pro-Palestinian protests in Albania =

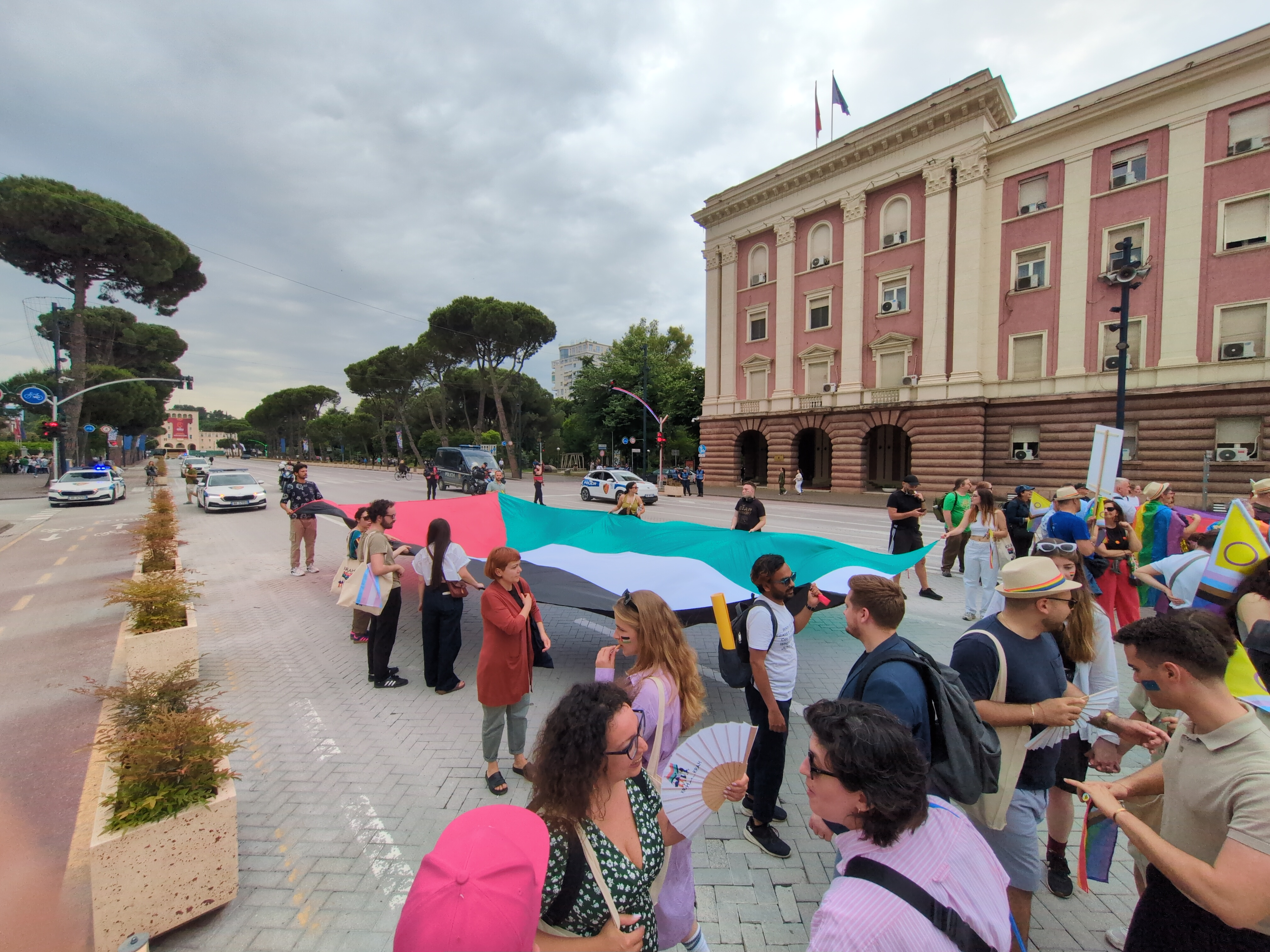
Palestine flag during Pride 2025 in Tirana.

This is a list of pro-Palestinian protests in Albania including demonstrations, marches, sit-ins, direct actions, and campus encampments in support of Palestinian rights.

== List ==
Estimated attendance is either mentioned explicitly in the references or a midpoint is used, i.e., 50 when dozens are mentioned, 500 when hundreds are mentioned, and so on.

=== Pre-2023 ===
Date	City/town	Estimated attendance	Description	Ref(s)
15 May 2021	Tirana	?	Demonstration in the city center.	
16 May 2021	Tirana	?	Demonstration at the Skanderbeg Square. Ended with police intervention.	

=== 2023 ===
Date	City/town	Estimated attendance	Description	Ref(s)
20 October 2023	Tirana	50	Demonstration at the Skanderbeg Square. Protesters condemned Israel's attacks on Palestinians and called for an end to the Israeli occupation of Palestine and for the implementation of the two-state solution.	
5 November 2023	Tirana	50	Demonstration at the Skanderbeg Square. Protesters attempted to march through the city but were stopped by police.	

=== 2024 ===
Date	City/town	Estimated attendance	Description	Ref(s)
22 January 2024	Tirana	?	Demonstration and rally through the city center. Protesters held signs with messages such as "Implement UN resolutions", "Stop Israel’s war crimes in Gaza", and "Stop the genocide in Gaza".	
4 May 2024	Tirana	50	Demonstration at the Skanderbeg Square.	
27 July 2024	Tirana	?	Demonstration in the city center.	

=== 2025 ===
Date	City/town	Estimated attendance	Description	Ref(s)
11 April 2025	Tirana	?	Demonstration in front of the Parliament building against the visit of Albanian Prime Minister Edi Rama to Israel.	
23 July 2025	Tirana	500	Demonstration at the Skanderbeg Square. Greta Thunberg spoke to the protesters.	
13 August 2025	Tirana	2,000-3,000	Demonstration at the Skanderbeg Square. Protesters attempted to march through the city but were stopped by police.	
23 September 2025	Tirana	?	Demonstration at the Skanderbeg Square. Protesters attempted to march towards Kavaja Street but were stopped by police.	

== See also ==
- Gaza war protests
- Boycott, Divestment, and Sanctions
- Lists of pro-Palestinian protests
