= List of pro-Palestinian protests in Switzerland =

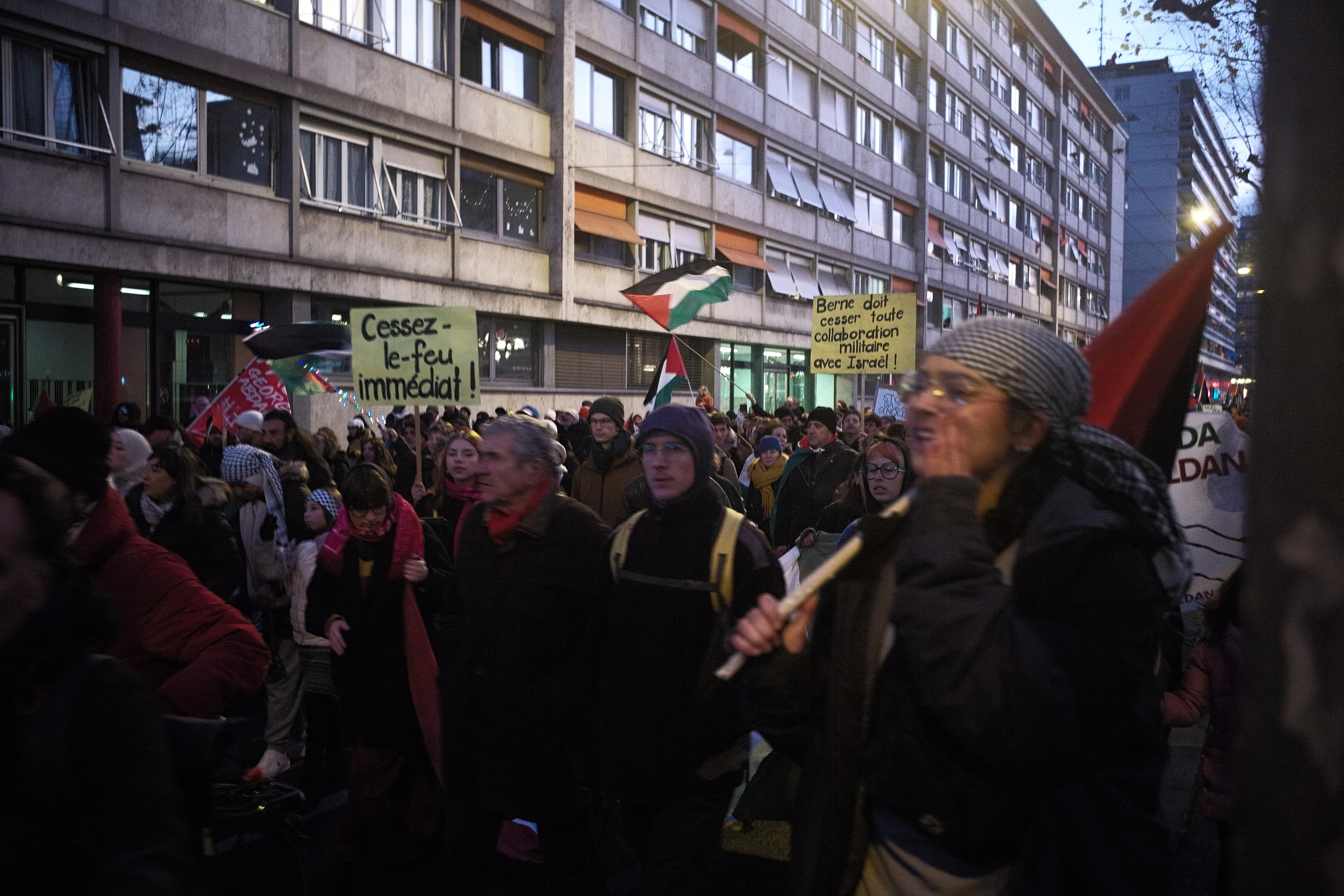
March in Geneva, 16 December 2023.

This is a list of pro-Palestinian protests in Switzerland including demonstrations, marches, sit-ins, direct actions, and campus encampments in support of Palestinian rights.

== List ==
Estimated attendance is either mentioned explicitly in the references or a midpoint is used, i.e., 50 when dozens are mentioned, 500 when hundreds are mentioned, and so on.

=== Pre-2023 ===
Date	City/town	Estimated attendance	Description	Ref(s)
31 December 2008	Basel	100	Demonstration in the city center calling for an end of Israel's occupation of Palestine.	
31 December 2008	Zurich	600	Demonstration in the city center in protest of Israeli bombardments in Gaza.	
29 May 2015	Zurich	50	Demonstration to expel Israel from FIFA.	
3 February 2018	Bern	350	Demonstration in the city center in solidarity with Palestine and against Trump's recognition of Jerusalem as capital of Israel.	
15 May 2018	Geneva	300–500	Activists gathered in Bel-Air in support of the Palestinian right of return during the 2018–2019 Gaza border protests.	

=== 2023 ===
Date	City/town	Estimated attendance	Description	Ref(s)
20 May 2023	Zurich	?	Demonstration in the city center on the occasion of the 75 years of the Nakba.	
14 October 2023	Geneva	?	Demonstration in front of the Office of the High Commissioner for Human Rights.	
14 October 2023	Bern	5,000	Demonstration in the city center.	
25 November 2023	Geneva	?	Demonstration outside the United Nations Office.	

=== 2024 ===
Date	City/town	Estimated attendance	Description	Ref(s)
13 January 2024	Basel	15,000	Demonstration and march through the city center to commemorate the Global Day of Action for Gaza. This protest followed a prohibition imposed by several German-speaking Swiss cantons on similar activities.	
2 May 2024	Lausanne	500	Occupation of a building at the University of Lausanne. Lasted at least until 5 May.	
7 May 2024	Geneva	?	Occupation of a hall of the University of Geneva. Lasted until 15 May. Ended with police intervention.	
7 May 2024	Lausanne	50	Demonstration at École Polytechnique Fédérale de Lausanne. Ended with police intervention.	
7 May 2024	Zurich	50	Occupation of the main entrance hall of the ETH Zurich. Ended with police intervention. Several protesters were charged with trespassing and 38 received penal orders.	
12 May 2024	Bern	60	Occupation of a building at the University of Bern. Lasted until 15 May. Ended with police intervention.	

=== 2025 ===
Date	City/town	Estimated attendance	Description	Ref(s)
25 January 2025	Geneva	2,200	Demonstration in the city center.	
8 May 2025	Geneva	?	Occupation of a building at the University of Geneva. Lasted until 15 May. Ended with protesters leaving on their own.	
11 May 2025	Basel	500	Demonstration outside the "Turquoise Carpet" event of the Eurovision Song Contest 2025 in protest of Israel's participation in the contest.	
25 May 2025	Bern	2,000	Demonstration and march through the city center.	
27 September 2025	Geneva	6,000-10,000	Demonstration in the city center.	
2 October 2025	Bern	500	Demonstration in the city center in solidarity with the Global Sumud Flotilla activists that were kidnapped by Israel in international waters. Some train and tram traffic was blocked.	
2 October 2025	Basel	?	Demonstration in the city center.	
2 October 2025	Lucerne	?	Demonstration in the city center.	
2 October 2025	Lugano	?	Demonstration in the city center.	
2 October 2025	Sion	?	Demonstration in the city center.	
2 October 2025	Lausanne	500-1,000	Demonstration in the city center.	
2 October 2025	Zurich	1,000	Demonstration at Helvetiaplatz.	
2 October 2025	Geneva	3,000	Demonstration at the Lisa Girardin Square.	
11 October 2025	Bern	5,000	Demonstration near Bern's main railway station and march towards the Federal Palace. Ended with police intervention, including the use of water cannons, tear gas, and rubber bullets. 536 protesters were taken by the police for identity checks. At least 326 protesters and 18 officers were injured.	
19 October 2025	Geneva	1,800-2,000	Demonstration and march through the city center.	
8 November 2025	Geneva	5,000	Demonstration and march through the city center.	
29 November 2025	Geneva	5,000	Demonstration and march through the city center to commemorate International Day of Solidarity with the Palestinian People.	
9 December 2025	Geneva	50	Demonstration outside Bel-Air.	

=== 2026 ===
Date	City/town	Estimated attendance	Description	Ref(s)
3 October 2026	Geneva	1,500	Demonstration in the city center, with protestors denounced Israel's actions and demanded the Swiss government to impose sanctions against Israel.	
10 October 2026	Lausanne	2,000	Demonstration and march through the city center.	
10 October 2026	Zurich	1,000	Demonstration and march in Zurich's Bahnhofstrasse and observed a minute of silence.	

== See also ==
- Gaza war protests
- Boycott, Divestment, and Sanctions
- Lists of pro-Palestinian protests
