= List of pro-Palestinian protests in Slovenia =

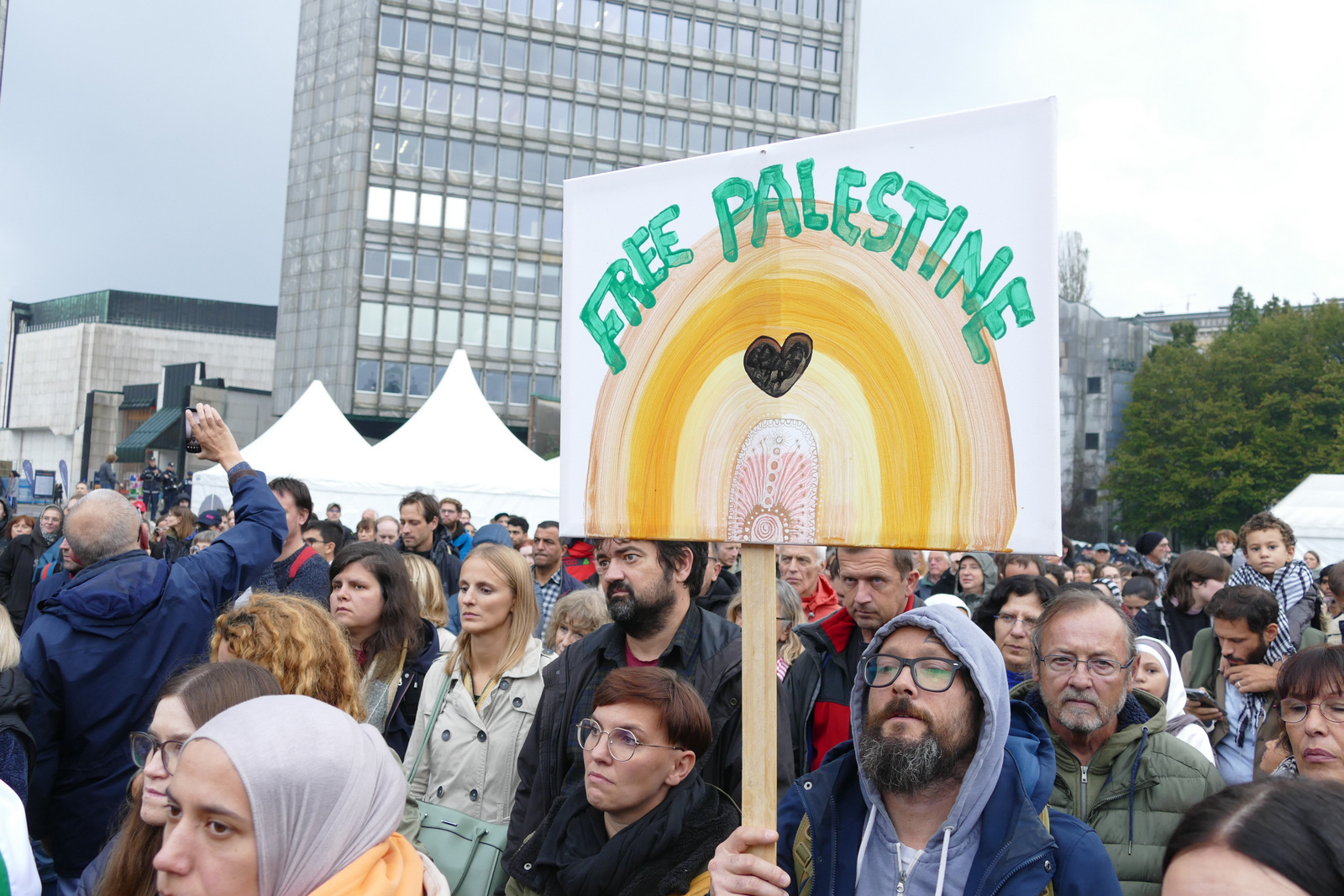
Pro-Palestine protest in Ljubljana, 13 October 2023

This is a list of pro-Palestinian protests in Slovenia including demonstrations, marches, sit-ins, direct actions, and campus encampments in support of Palestinian rights.

== List ==
Estimated attendance is either mentioned explicitly in the references or a midpoint is used, i.e., 50 when dozens are mentioned, 500 when hundreds are mentioned, and so on.

=== Pre-2023 ===
Date	Municipality	Estimated attendance	Description	Ref(s)
17 January 2009	Ljubljana	500	Demonstration in the city center.	
18 July 2014	Ljubljana	?	Demonstration in the city center.	
23 July 2014	Ljubljana	20	Demonstration in front of the European Commission Representation in Slovenia.	
21 May 2021	Ljubljana	800	Demonstration in the city center. Ended with police intervention. One protester was injured. Two protesters were arrested.	

=== 2023 ===
Date	Municipality	Estimated attendance	Description	Ref(s)
19 October 2023	Ljubljana	500	Demonstration and march through the city center.	
9 November 2023	Ljubljana	500	Demonstration in the city center.	

=== 2024 ===
Date	Municipality	Estimated attendance	Description	Ref(s)
7 April 2024	Ljubljana	600	Demonstration and march through the city center. Protesters laid down clothes representing Palestinians killed by Israel.	
8 May 2024	Ljubljana	50	Occupation of the main lecture hall at the Faculty of Social Sciences of the University of Ljubljana. Lasted until 13 May, after protesters having all of their demands met by the university.	
22 May 2024	Koper	50	Demonstration in the Port of Koper against the arrival of a ship allegedly transporting military cargo for the Israeli armed forces.	
3 October 2024	Ljubljana	?	Demonstration in the city center.	
27 November 2024	Maribor	100	Night rally through the city center.	

=== 2025 ===
Date	Municipality	Estimated attendance	Description	Ref(s)
5 June 2025	Ljubljana	?	Demonstration in the city center.	
4 August 2025	Ljubljana	?	Demonstration with a musical protest in honor of ten-year-old Palestinian girl Sara Hamed Elkarnavi killed by Israel on 2 August.	
6 August 2025	Ljubljana	2,000	Demonstration and march through the city center.	
1 September 2025	Bled	?	Demonstration in front of the Bled Festival Hall.	
11 October 2025	Ljubljana	?	Demonstration as part of the "festival miru" ("peace festival"). Participants read out the names of Palestinian children killed in the Gaza genocide.	

=== 2026 ===
Date	Municipality	Estimated attendance	Description	Ref(s)
9 September 2026	Ljubljana	2,000	Demonstration and march through the city center to protest against the opening of the first Israeli embassy in the city.	

== See also ==
- Gaza war protests
- Boycott, Divestment, and Sanctions
- Lists of pro-Palestinian protests
