= List of pro-Palestinian protests in Greece =

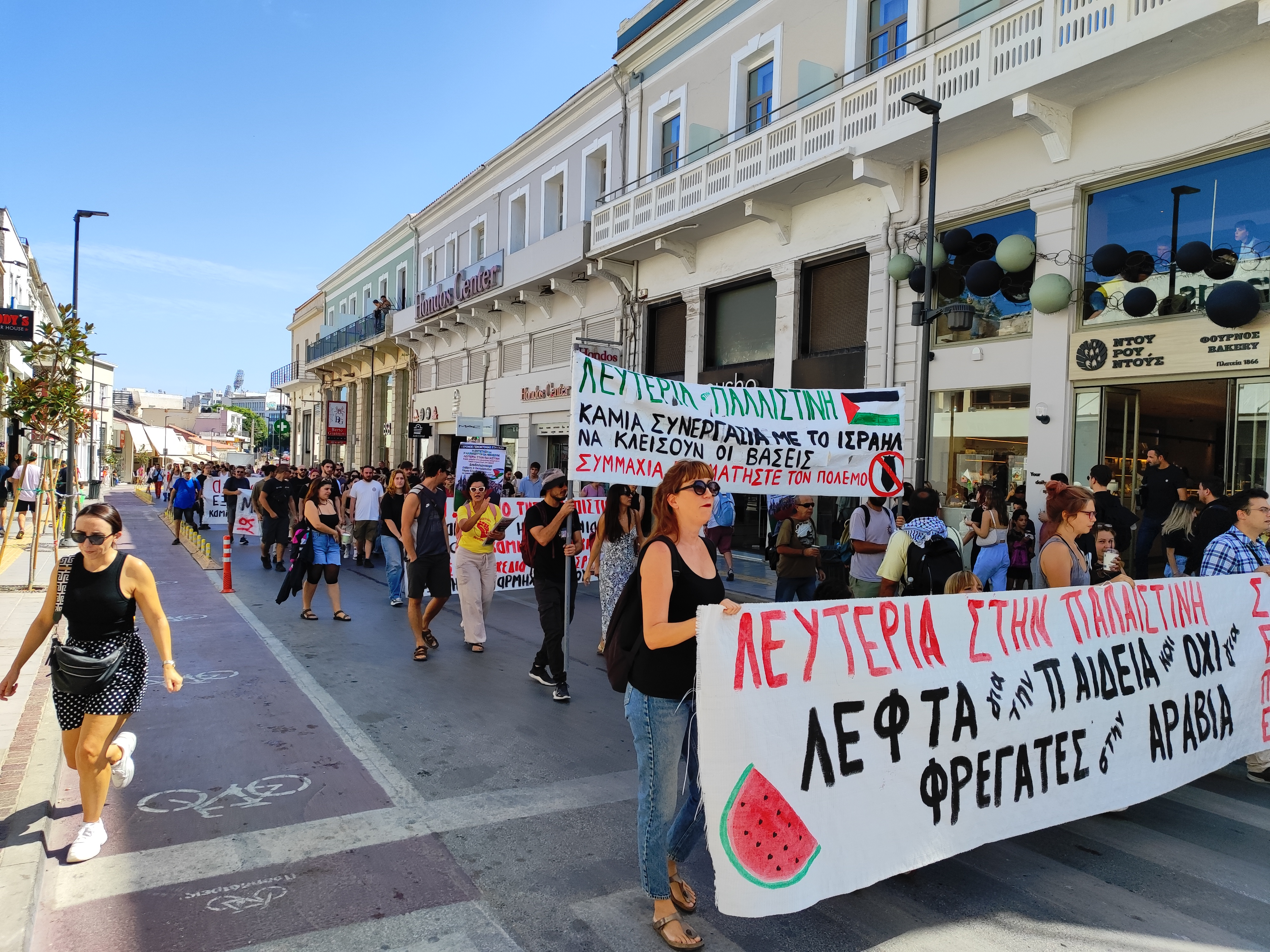
Pro-Palestinian march in Chania, 5 October 2024.

This is a list of pro-Palestinian protests in Greece including demonstrations, marches, sit-ins, direct actions, and campus encampments in support of Palestinian rights.

== List ==
Estimated attendance is either mentioned explicitly in the references or a midpoint is used, i.e., 50 when dozens are mentioned, 500 when hundreds are mentioned, and so on.

=== Pre-2023 ===
| Date | City/town | Estimated attendance | Description | Ref(s) |
|---|---|---|---|---|
| 30 December 2008 | Athens | ? | Demonstration outside the Israeli Embassy. Ended with riot police intervention, including the use of tear gas. | |
| 17 July 2014 | Athens | 1,000 | Two separate demonstrations to protest against Israel's actions in Gaza outside of the Israeli embassy. | |
| 15 May 2018 | Athens | ? | Demonstration and march through the city center towards the Israeli Embassy. | |
| 14 May 2021 | Chania | ? | Demonstration and march through the city center. | |
| 14 May 2021 | Patras | 500 | Demonstration and march through the city center. | |
| 14 May 2021 | Thessaloniki | 500 | Demonstration and march through the city center. | |
| 15 May 2021 | Athens | ? | Demonstration and march through the city center towards the Israeli Embassy. | |
| 15 May 2021 | Xanthi | ? | Demonstration and march through the city center. | |

=== 2023 ===
| Date | City/town | Estimated attendance | Description | Ref(s) |
|---|---|---|---|---|
| 12 October 2023 | Athens | 200 | Demonstration and march through the city center. | |
| 13 October 2023 | Athens | 2,000 | Demonstration and march through the city center towards the Israeli Embassy. | |
| 29 October 2023 | Athens | 5,000 | Demonstration and march through the city center. | |
| 5 November 2023 | Athens | ? | Demonstration and march through the city center. | |

=== 2024 ===
| Date | City/town | Estimated attendance | Description | Ref(s) |
|---|---|---|---|---|
| 25 March 2024 | Athens | ? | Blocking of a tank during a military parade of the Greece's Independence Day. | |
| 7 May 2024 | Athens | 300 | Demonstration and march through the city center. Ended with riot police intervention. | |
| 13 May 2024 | Thessaloniki | ? | Encampment in the city center organized by student unions. | |
| 13 May 2024 | Athens | 5,000 | Demonstration in front of the University of Athens, followed by encampment at the Law School of the University of Athens. Lasted until 14 May. Ended with police intervention. 28 protesters were arrested, 9 faced potential deportation. | |
| 14 May 2024 | Athens | 500 | Demonstration in front of the University of Athens. | |
| 15 May 2024 | Athens | 2,500 | Demonstration and march through the city center towards the Israeli Embassy. Ended with police intervention. Three protesters were detained. | |
| 5 October 2024 | Chania | ? | Demonstration and march through the city center. | |
| 5 October 2024 | Heraklion | ? | Demonstration and march through the city center. | |
| 5 October 2024 | Ioannina | ? | Demonstration and march through the city center. | |
| 5 October 2024 | Patras | ? | Demonstration and march through the city center. | |
| 5 October 2024 | Piraeus | ? | Demonstration and march through the city center. | |
| 5 October 2024 | Thessaloniki | ? | Demonstration and march through the city center. | |
| 5 October 2024 | Volos | ? | Demonstration and march through the city center. | |
| 5 October 2024 | Xanthi | ? | Demonstration and march through the city center. | |
| 5 October 2024 | Athens | 5,000 | Demonstration and march through the city center. | |

=== 2025 ===
| Date | City/town | Estimated attendance | Description | Ref(s) |
|---|---|---|---|---|
| 15 July 2025 | Piraeus | ? | Blocking of the Port of Piraeus by dockworkers against the Israeli ship Ever Golden transporting military equipment to Haifa. | |
| 22 July 2025 | Syros | 300 | Demonstration against the docking of the MS Crown Iris which is owned by Israeli cruise company, Mano Maritime. The ship was rerouted to Cyprus. | |
| 10 August 2025 | Thessaloniki | ? | Demonstration and march through the city center. | |
| 10 August 2025 | Mytilene | ? | Demonstration and march through the city center. | |
| 10 August 2025 | Zakynthos | ? | Demonstration and march through the city center. | |
| 10 August 2025 | Chania | 50 | Demonstration and march through the city center. | |
| 10 August 2025 | Kalamata | 500 | Demonstration and march through the city center. | |
| 10 August 2025 | Syros | 500 | Demonstration and march through the city center. | |
| 10 August 2025 | Athens | 5,000 | Demonstration in the city center. | |
| 24 August 2025 | Thessaloniki | 500 | Demonstration and march through the city center. | |
| 13 September 2025 | Athens | ? | Demonstration in front of the Monument to the Unknown Soldier. Clashes occurred between pro-Palestinian and pro-Israeli supporters. Ended with police intervention. All involved were detained. One protester was injured. | |
| 20 September 2025 | Athens | ? | Demonstration and march through the city center. | |
| 7 October 2025 | Athens | 500 | Demonstration and march towards the US and the Israeli embassies. Ended with police intervention. Several protesters were arrested. | |
| 10 October 2025 | Athens | ? | Demonstration and march toward the parliament building. | |

=== 2026 ===
| Date | City/town | Estimated attendance | Description | Ref(s) |
|---|---|---|---|---|
| 4 April 2026 | Athens | ? | Demonstration at Freedom Park and march to the US embassy. Protesters showed solidarity with Palestine, Iran, Yemen, Venezuela, Cuba, and others. They demanded Greece's withdrawal from NATO. | |
| 1 May 2026 | Athens | ? | March through the city center as part of the International Workers' Day parade. | |

== See also ==
- Gaza war protests
- Boycott, Divestment, and Sanctions
- Lists of pro-Palestinian protests
