= List of pro-Palestinian protests in Bosnia and Herzegovina =

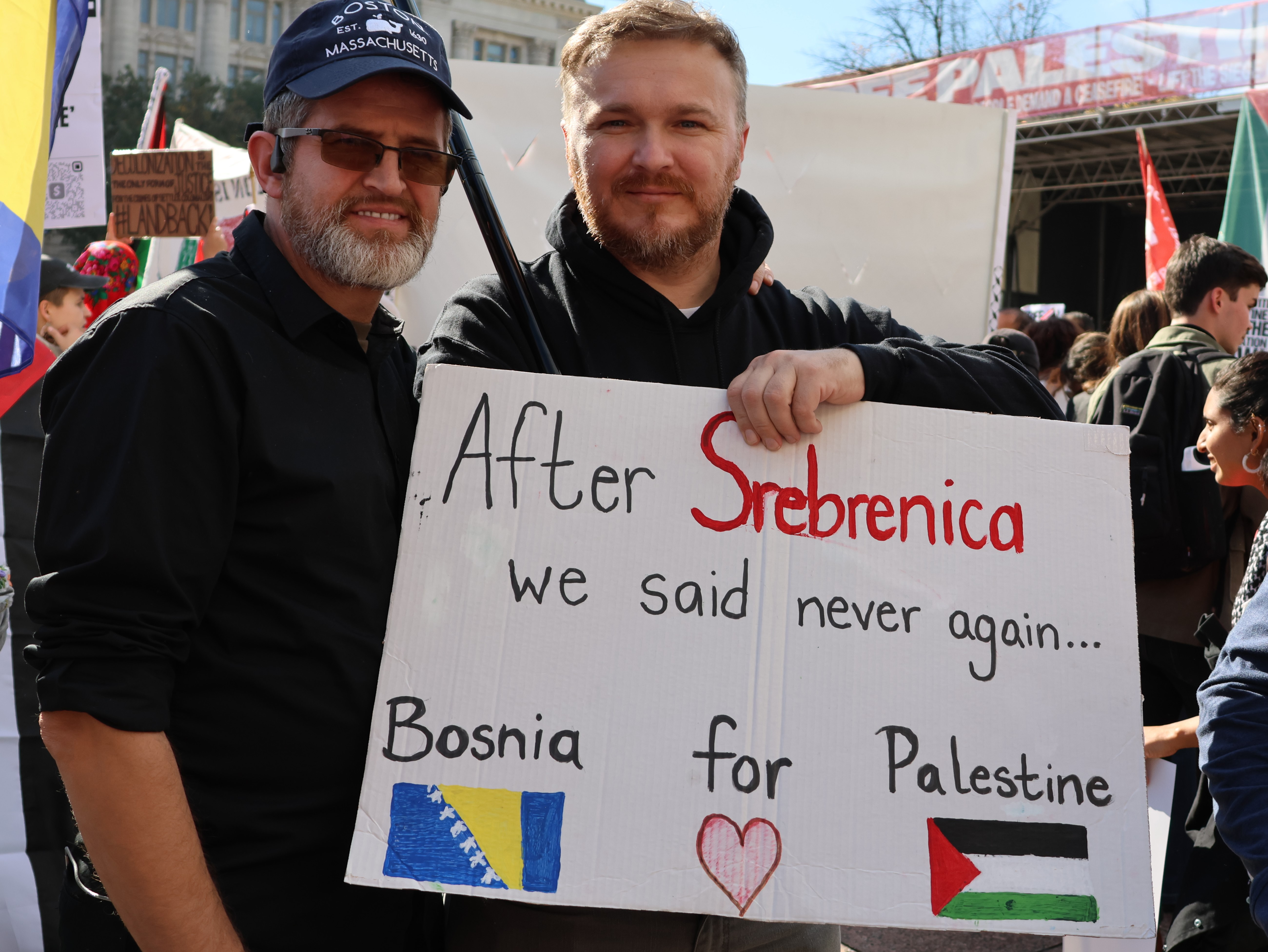
Pro-Palestinian Bosnian protesters, 4 November 2023.

This is a list of pro-Palestinian protests in Bosnia and Herzegovina including demonstrations, marches, sit-ins, direct actions, and campus encampments in support of Palestinian rights.

== List ==
Estimated attendance is either mentioned explicitly in the references or a midpoint is used, i.e., 50 when dozens are mentioned, 500 when hundreds are mentioned, and so on.

=== Pre-2023 ===
Date	City/town	Estimated attendance	Description	Ref(s)
10 January 2009	Sarajevo	?	Demonstration to protest against Israel's response in the 2008–2009 Gaza War.	
3 June 2010	Sarajevo	2,000	Demonstration and march through the city center by students against the attack on the Gaza Freedom Flotilla.	
23 September 2011	Sarajevo	?	Demonstration and march through the city center in support for the Palestinian people's admission to the United Nations.	
14 July 2014	Sarajevo	?	Demonstration in front of the United Nations building in Sarajevo and the Turkish Embassy.	
25 July 2014	Zenica	?	Demonstration in the city center.	
25 July 2014	Mostar	?	Demonstration in the city center.	
25 July 2014	Sarajevo	?	Demonstration in the city center.	
25 July 2014	Tuzla	200	Demonstration in the city center.	
12 June 2015	Zenica	500	Demonstration by Bosnian football fans outside of a hotel where Israeli players were staying, with some Bosnian fans stepping on an Israeli flag and shouting "Palestine" during the march.	
17 December 2017	Sarajevo	100	Demonstration to protest Donald Trump's decision to recognise Jerusalem as the capital of Israel.	
18 December 2017	Tuzla	100	Demonstration in the city center.	
14 May 2021	Sarajevo	?	Demonstration and march through the city center.	
29 May 2021	Tuzla	?	Demonstration in the city center.	

=== 2023 ===
Date	City/town	Estimated attendance	Description	Ref(s)
13 October 2023	Sarajevo	500	Night march through the city center.	
14 October 2023	Mostar	?	Demonstration in the city center. Protesters unfurled a large Palestinian flag on the Stari Most over the Neretva river.	
22 October 2023	Tuzla	5,000	Demonstration in the city center.	
22 October 2023	Sarajevo	5,000	Demonstration and march through the city center. Protesters chanted "Yesterday Srebrenica, today Gaza", referring to the 1995 massacre of 8000 Muslim men and boys.	
28 October 2023	Mostar	5,000	Demonstration and march through the city center despite the city ban on protests by Mayor Mario Kordić.	
29 October 2023	Zenica	5,000	Demonstration and march through the city center.	
12 November 2023	Sarajevo	5,000	Demonstration in the city center.	

=== 2024 ===
Date	City/town	Estimated attendance	Description	Ref(s)
7 January 2024	Sarajevo	?	Demonstration and march through the city center.	
9 March 2024	Sarajevo	500	Demonstration and march through the city center.	
7 April 2024	Sarajevo	50	Demonstration and march through the city center.	
7 July 2024	Mostar	?	Demonstration in the city center. Protesters unfurled again a large Palestinian flag on the Stari Most over the Neretva river.	
3 August 2024	Sarajevo	?	Demonstration and march through the city center.	
27 October 2024	Sarajevo	500	Demonstration and march through the city center.	
29 November 2024	Sarajevo	?	Art demonstration with fundraisers. Lasted until 1 December.	

=== 2025 ===
Date	City/town	Estimated attendance	Description	Ref(s)
20 April 2025	Sarajevo	500	Demonstration and march through the city center.	
12 June 2025	Sarajevo	?	Demonstration and march through the city center.	
25 July 2025	Sarajevo	?	Demonstration outside Gazi Husrev-beg Mosque.	
26 July 2025	Sarajevo	50	Demonstration and march through the city center.	
27 July 2025	Mostar	?	Demonstration in the city center.	
4 September 2025	Sarajevo	?	Demonstration by the Miljacka river. Participants launched symbolic paper boats symbolizing in solidarity with the Global Sumud Flotilla.	
5 September 2025	Sarajevo	?	Disruption of a lecture by Jeff Barr, Vice President of Amazon Web Services. Protesters chanted messages such as "Free Palestine" and "AWS profits from genocide".	
20 September 2025	Sarajevo	?	Demonstration and march through the city center organized by survivors of the Bosnian genocide. Protesters carried a large Palestine flag and placed 18000 shoes in the ground symbolizing Palestinian children killed by Israel.	
5 October 2025	Sarajevo	500	Demonstration and march through the city center.	
12 October 2025	Sarajevo	6,000	Demonstration and march through the city center.	

== See also ==
- Gaza war protests
- Boycott, Divestment, and Sanctions
- Lists of pro-Palestinian protests
