= Lists of pro-Palestinian protests =

This is a list of lists of pro-Palestinian protests by country, including demonstrations, marches, sit-ins, direct actions, and campus encampments in support of Palestinian rights.

- List of pro-Palestinian protests in Albania
- List of pro-Palestinian protests in Australia
- List of pro-Palestinian protests in Austria
- List of pro-Palestinian protests in Belgium
- List of pro-Palestinian protests in Bosnia and Herzegovina
- List of pro-Palestinian protests in Cyprus
- List of pro-Palestinian protests in Denmark
- List of pro-Palestinian protests in Finland
- List of pro-Palestinian protests in France
- List of pro-Palestinian protests in Germany
- List of pro-Palestinian protests in Greece
- List of pro-Palestinian protests in Ireland
- List of pro-Palestinian protests in Italy
- List of pro-Palestinian protests in Malta
- List of pro-Palestinian protests in the Netherlands
- List of pro-Palestinian protests in Pakistan
- List of pro-Palestinian protests in Portugal
- List of pro-Palestinian protests in Slovenia
- List of pro-Palestinian protests in Spain
- List of pro-Palestinian protests in Sweden
- List of pro-Palestinian protests in Switzerland
- List of pro-Palestinian protests in the United Kingdom
- List of pro-Palestinian protests on university campuses in 2024
  - List of pro-Palestinian protests on university campuses in the United States in 2024
  - List of pro-Palestinian protests on university campuses in California in 2024
