= 2024 University of California, Los Angeles pro-Palestinian campus occupation =

2024 occupation protest in Los Angeles, California

2024 UCLA pro-Palestinian campus occupation
- Part of Gaza war protests (in the US at universities (in 2024 (in the US (in California))))
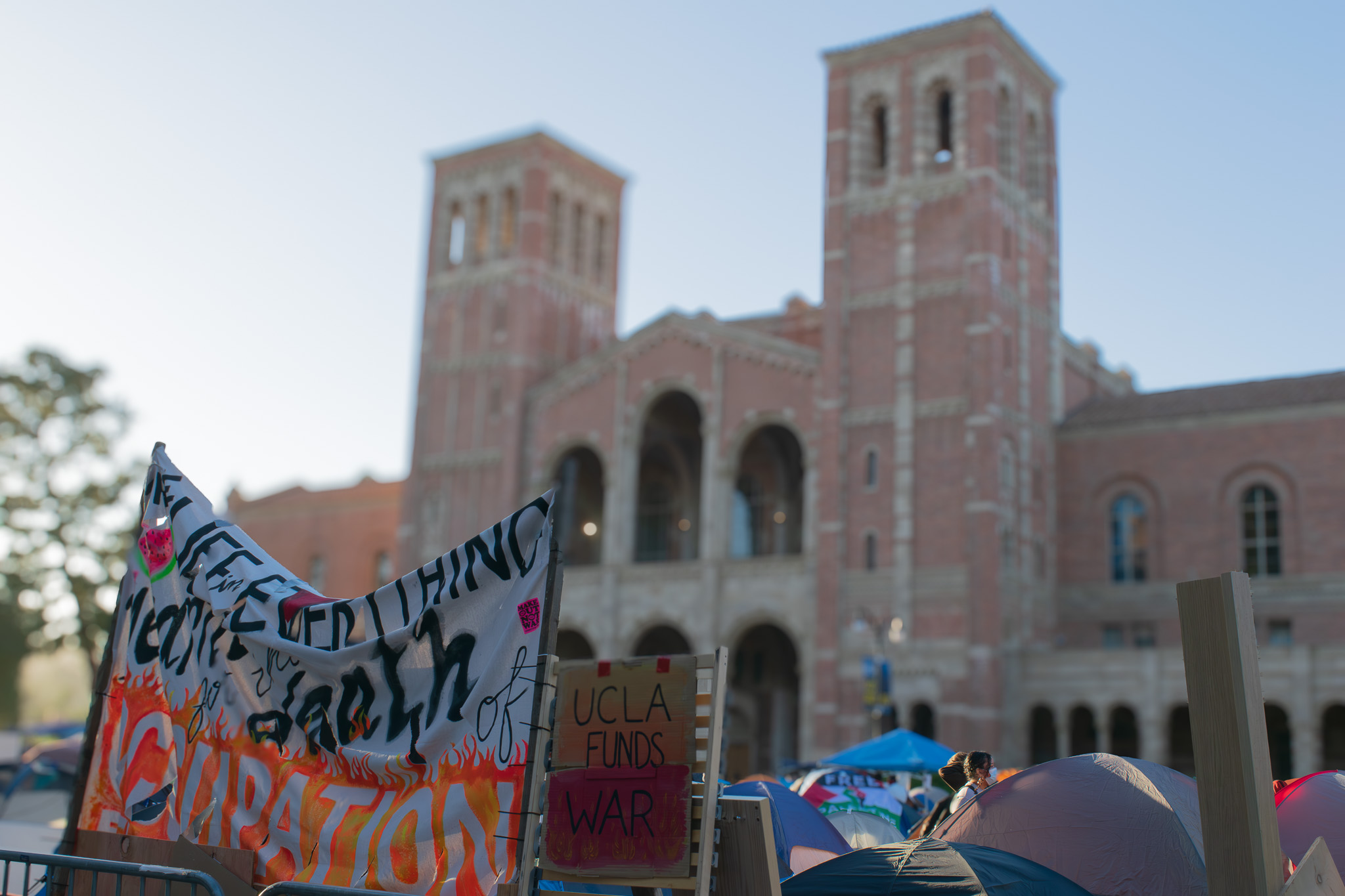
- The UCLA Palestine Solidarity Encampment on April 27, 2024
- Date: April 25 – May 2, 2024 (8 days)
- Location: Los Angeles, California, United States
- Caused by: Gaza war; Anti-Zionism; Opposition to UCLA's investments in Israel
- Goals: UCLA's divestment from Israel; UCLA's call for a ceasefire; Academic boycott of Israel
- Methods: Protests; Occupation; Civil disobedience; Picketing
- Status: Protestors suppressed: LAPD raids encampment on May 2 and clears the area; Participants arrested and suspended

Parties
Pro-Palestinian groups: Palestine Solidarity Encampment; UC Divest Coalition; Students for Justice in Palestine; Jewish Voice for Peace; IfNotNow; Harriet Tubman Center for Social Justice	Law enforcement: Los Angeles Police Department; California Highway Patrol; University of California Police Department; Pro-Israel groups: StandWithUs; Israeli-American Council; United Jewish Coalition

Casualties
- Injuries: 15-25+ protesters (at least one hospitalized) and 4 reporters by counter-protesters, Multiple protesters injured by rubber bullets fire by police
- Arrested: 210

On April 25, 2024, a student protest began at the University of California, Los Angeles (UCLA) to protest the administration's investments in Israel. The occupation, self-titled as the 'Palestine Solidarity Encampment', was a part of pro-Palestine protests on university campuses campaigning for divestment from Israel. The encampment was attacked multiple times by counter protestors, leading to clashes. On May 2, the Los Angeles Police Department (LAPD) raided and dismantled the encampment, arresting the protestors and ending the occupation.

== Background ==
On April 17, pro-Palestinian protestors at Columbia University began an occupation protest on its campus to protest Columbia's investments in Israel amid the Gaza war. The protest, as well as its forced dismantling (when university president Minouche Shafik authorized the New York City Police Department to storm the campus and conduct mass arrests) sparked a series of nationwide protests and encampments for divestment.

Protesters have alleged that UCLA invests in organizations that do business either in, or with, Israel. The protestors gave BlackRock as an example of such a company that does business in Israel which they believe is part of UCLA's investment portfolio.

== Occupation ==
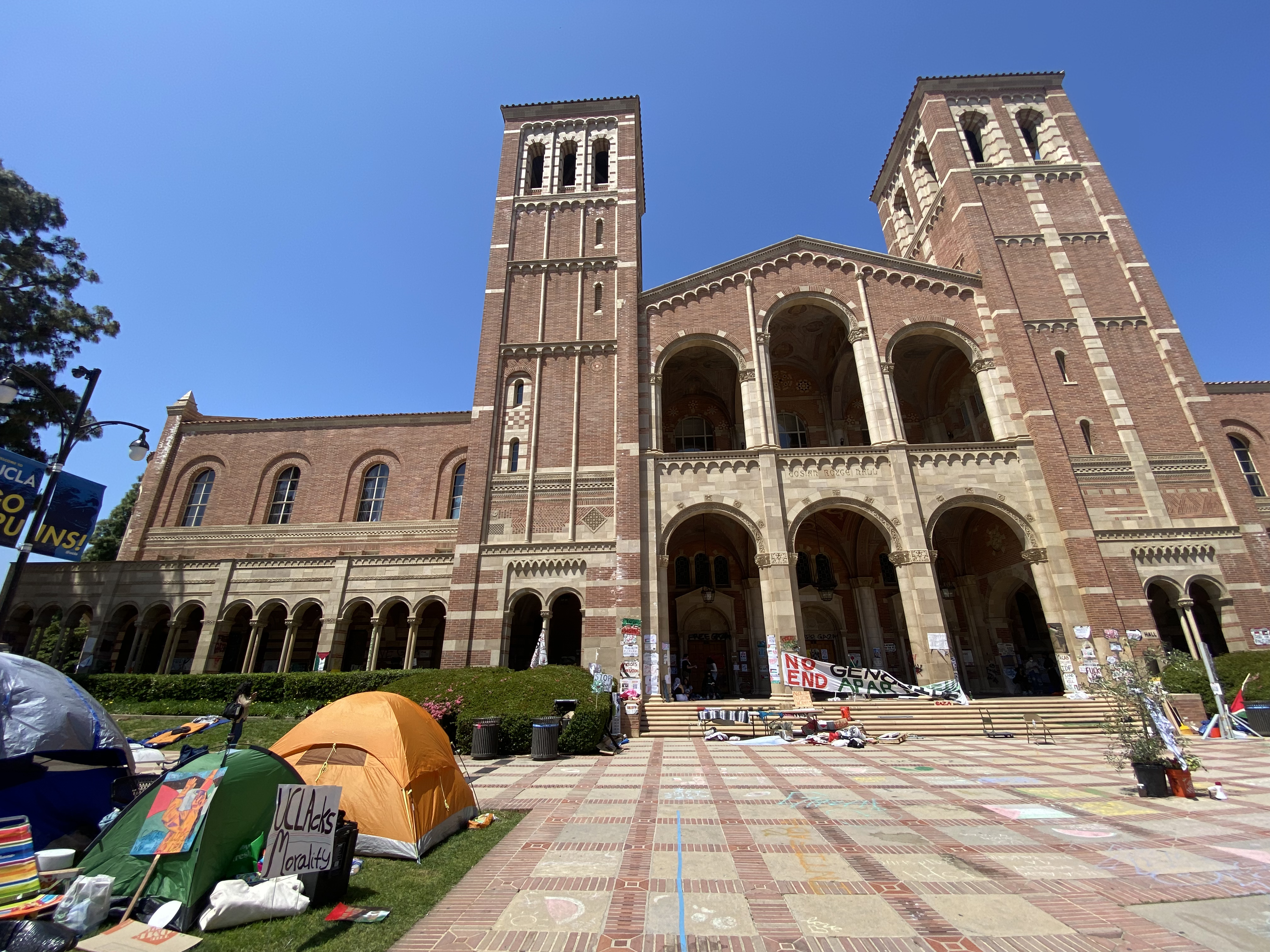
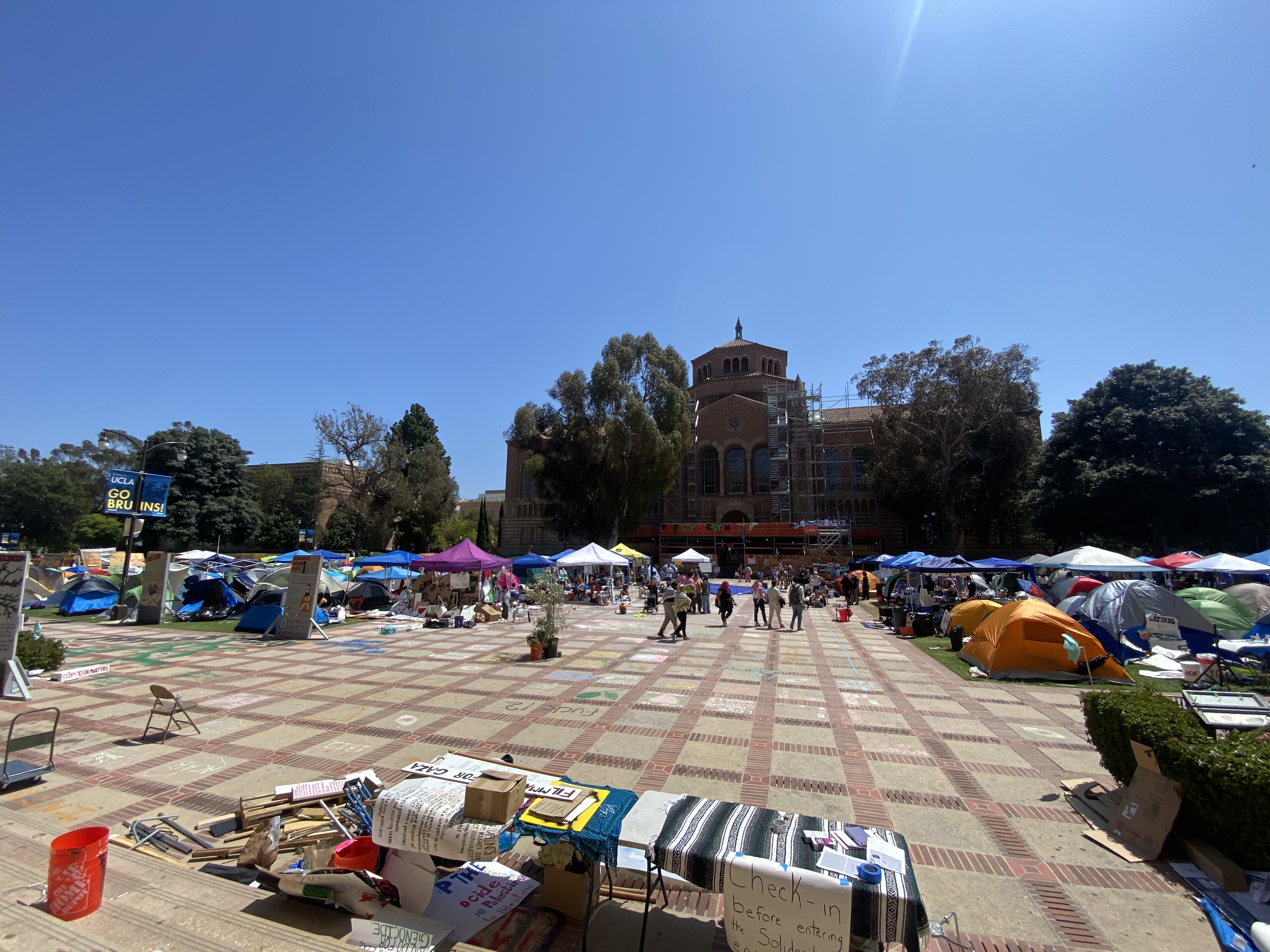
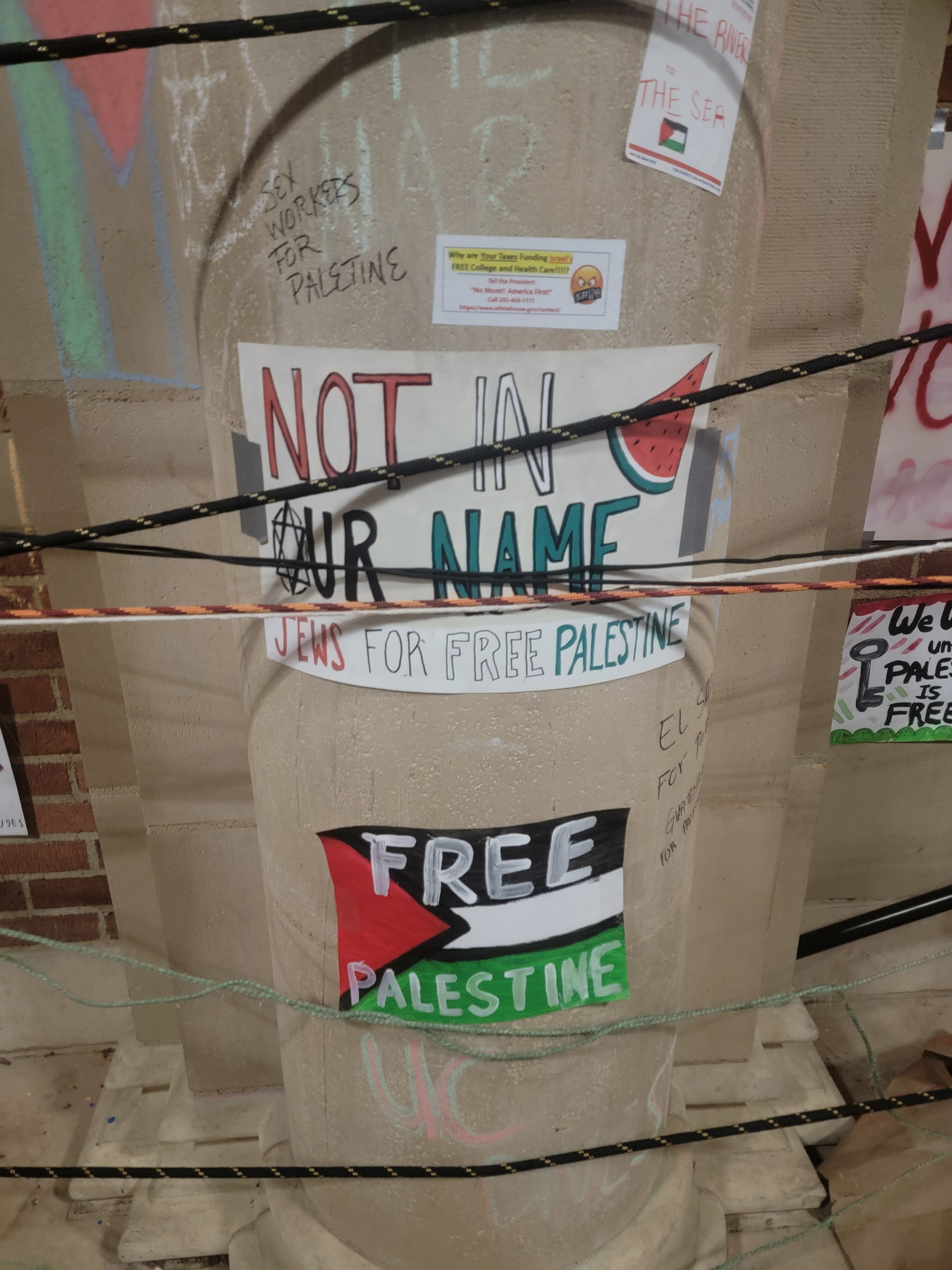
The student encampment in the plaza between Royce Hall and Powell Library. Left: View from the center of the plaza towards Royce Hall, Center: View from Royce Hall with Powell Library in the background, Right: Closeup of graffiti and posters at Royce Hall.

=== April 25 ===
On April 25, students and faculty set up the encampment. They released a list of demands, including UCLA's divestment from companies that profit off the Gaza war, a disclosure of where the UC system is investing tuition money, the UC system to cut ties with city police departments who police student activism, an end to academic collaboration with institutions that are profiting and collaborating with Israel, and an immediate and permanent ceasefire.

Protestors erected wooden barricades and displayed signs that included slogans such as "UCLA says Free Palestine" and "UC has blood on its hands." The 'Palestine Solidarity Encampment' group was set up, which includes the UC Divest Coalition, Students for Justice in Palestine, and Jewish Voice for Peace. IfNotNow was also present at the protests. The group posted online a list of demands for the administration, which includes divestment from Israel, calling for a ceasefire, and an academic boycott of Israel.

Members of pro-Israel groups included the Israeli American Council and United Jewish Coalition and other protestors in support of Israel surrounded the encampment. Some minor skirmishes between protestors were reported.

=== April 26–29 ===
On April 26, the administration released a statement saying that it prioritized the safety of students and minimizing disruption, but also that it supported free expression on campus and was therefore not requesting law enforcement at that time. UCLA police patrolled the perimeter of the encampment. Some Israeli and Jewish students said they felt uncomfortable. Pro-Palestinian protestors requested UCLA to not send in police. On April 27, pro-Israel counter-protestors raised more than $50,000 in three hours on GoFundMe to fund a screen and loudspeaker. Jessica Seinfeld, the wife of American comedian Jerry Seinfeld also posted on her social media account on Instagram that she had donated $5,000 to the counter-protestors.

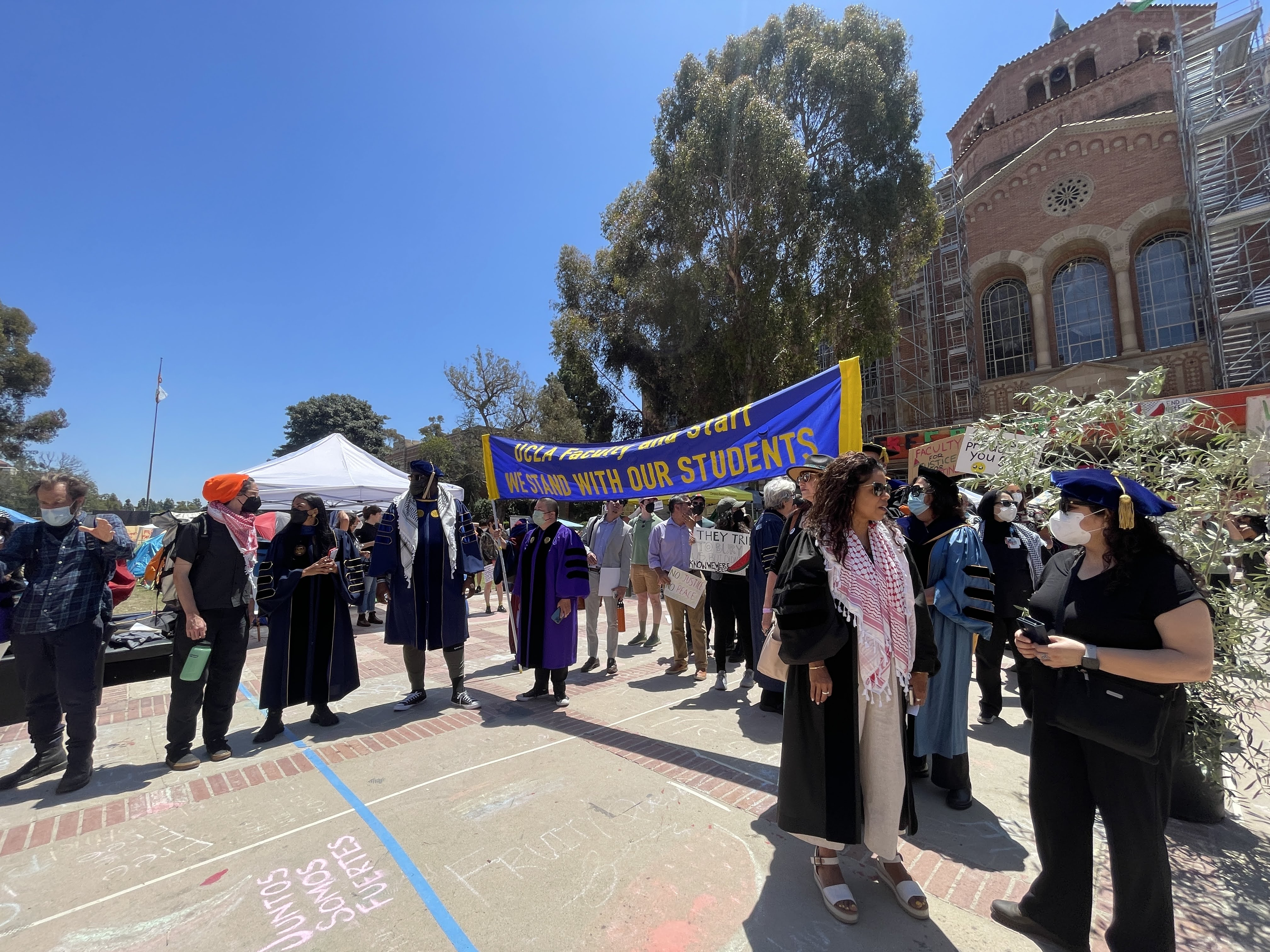
Faculty members holding a banner as they support the student protestors inside the encampment

On April 28, the administration created a physical barrier to separate dueling protestors. Later in the day, demonstrators broke through and a confrontation ensued. It was unclear what side broke through the barrier, and the administration condemned the violence. Pro-Palestinian demonstrators also clashed with police. Members of the Harriet Tubman Center for Social Justice held a solidarity demonstration with the pro-Palestinian protestors.

On April 29, faculty organized a walkout in solidarity with the protestors. Pro-Palestinian protestors set up metal barricades and appointed guards to block access to counter-protestors and media. Counter-protestors shouted through microphones and played loud music in front of the encampment early in the day. Later, a group of around 60 counter-protestors tried to breach the encampment, which led to heavy clashes. Security and UC officers with riot gear briefly intervened to separate the protestors. During clashes, counter-protestors released mice at the encampment. In response to the attack, the Council on American–Islamic Relations called on UCLA administration to investigate it as a hate crime.

=== April 30 ===
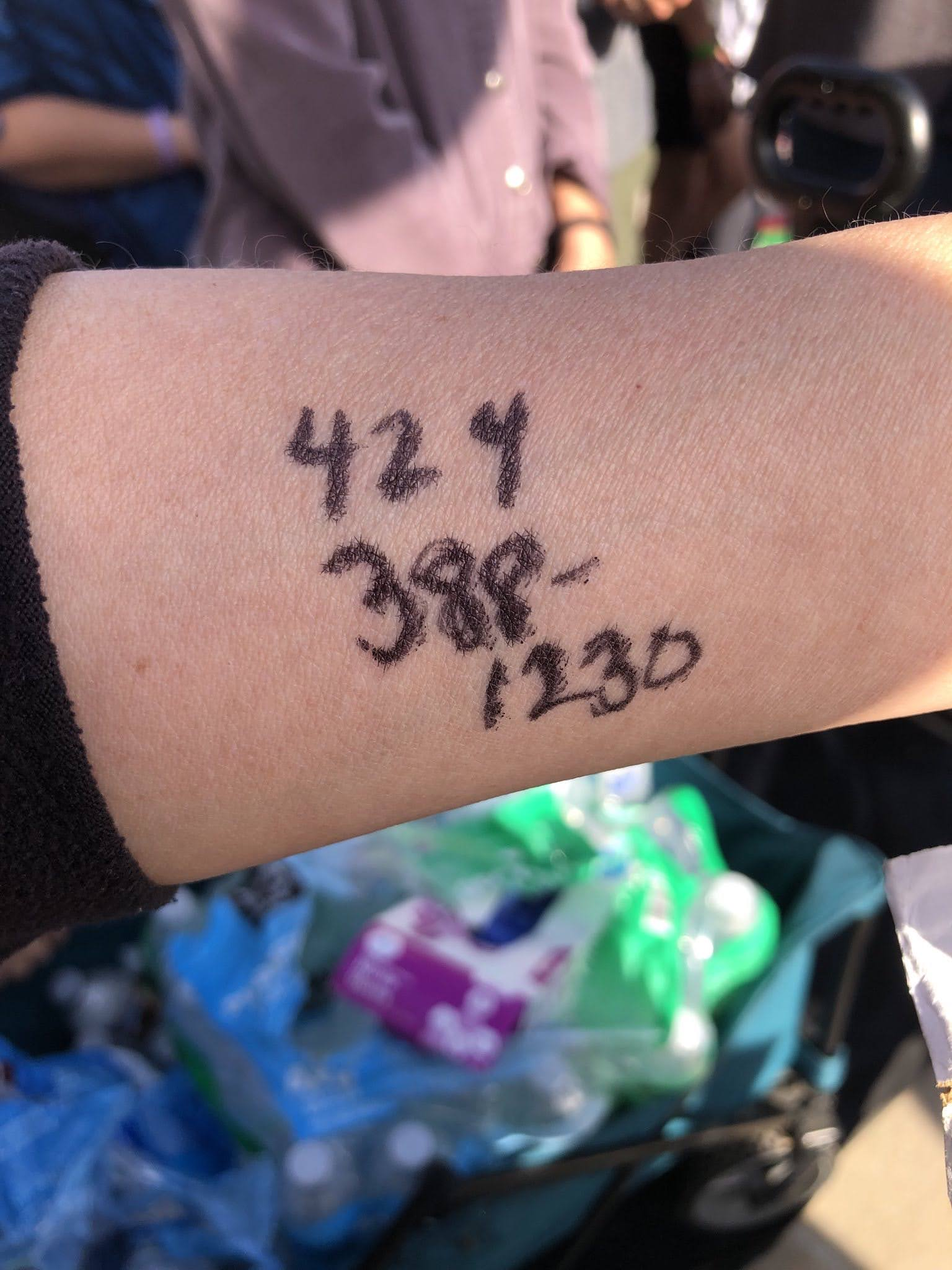
A protestor with a phone number to a counselor written on their arm in case they get arrested

A brief altercation between campus security and a disabled man occurred when the man tried to walk through a pathway blocked by the protest. The man said he was aware of the demonstrations, but didn't know that major pathways were blocked. Later in the afternoon, the UCLA Chancellor Gene Block shared a message with the UCLA community addressing the situation, stating that UCLA was increasing security presence on campus, removing barriers established by the encampment, and that the "student conduct process has been initiated, and could lead to disciplinary action including suspension or expulsion" for any UCLA faculty, staff or students involved.

Video of a female Jewish student's bleeding head went viral. The student was admitted to the ER and is reported to be in stable condition. The victim identified herself as Elinor Hess and claimed that she was shoved down when she reached to grab her flag, which fell down, and was kicked and pulled by the hair before she lost consciousness.

In an email to students, UCLA announced the extended closure of Powell Library and Royce Hall from 5:00 pm Tuesday, April 30. The facilities are planned to reopen Monday, May 6.

=== May 1–2 ===
==== Counter-protester attack ====
On May 1, around 10:50 PM, a pro-Israeli group attacked the pro-Palestinian protesters' camp for nearly four hours, attempting to breach the barricades surrounding the encampment. The attackers, reported to have come from outside campus, carried Israeli flags and assaulted students with sticks, stones, poles, metal fencing, and pepper spray. They played loud audio of a child crying, threw wood and a metal barrier into the camp, and threw at least six fireworks into the encampment, including one directly at a group of protesters carrying injured people.

A video investigation suggested pro-Palestinian protesters did not initiate any confrontation but acted in defense. The counter-protesters called for a "Second Nakba", referring to the ethnic cleansing of Palestinians in 1948, and played the Israeli national anthem and Harbu Darbu on loudspeakers during the attack. According to The Guardian, counter-protesters included several far-right activists involved in anti-LGBTQ+ and anti-vaccine campaigning. The Boston Review reported that Zionist counter-protestors joined forces with white supremacists and Neo-Nazis, and that "One neo-Nazi was heard shouting, 'we’re here to finish what Hitler started,' without any apparent protest from the self-identified Zionists."

Security personnel hired by UCLA refused to intervene and stood aside during the attack. LAPD officers arrived by 1:45 AM but waited at least an hour before intervening. None of the counter-protesters were known to have been arrested by May 3, though UCLA was investigating the attackers with help from LAPD and FBI by May 7. Witnesses said the LAPD intervened after nearly four hours of attacks by the pro-Israel counter-demonstrators. One counter-protester said, "We were all waiting for the LAPD to show up and they never did". Both the LAPD and the university's hired security faced criticism for not protecting the encamped students. An Al Jazeera English correspondent on the scene reported, "There seems to be absolutely no police intervention whatsoever."

Fifteen people were reported injured, including one who was hospitalized. Student journalists for the Daily Bruin described being targeted by the counter-protesters and punched, kicked, and beaten. It was reported that law enforcement did not track injuries related to the attack, but the encampments' organizers said that more than 150 students were "assaulted with pepper spray and bear mace" and that at least 25 were transported to local emergency rooms for fractures, severe lacerations, and chemical-induced injuries.

On May 15, CNN identified a number of the violent counter-protesters, but UCLA police refused to comment on whether they would press charges. A report found one counter-protest group raised funds through GoFundMe, with Jessica Seinfeld and Bill Ackman donating $5,000 and $10,000, respectively.

==== Forced disbandment ====
In the evening, law enforcement in riot gear issued a dispersal order to over a thousand people who had gathered in support of the encampment, stating anyone who refused to leave could face arrest.

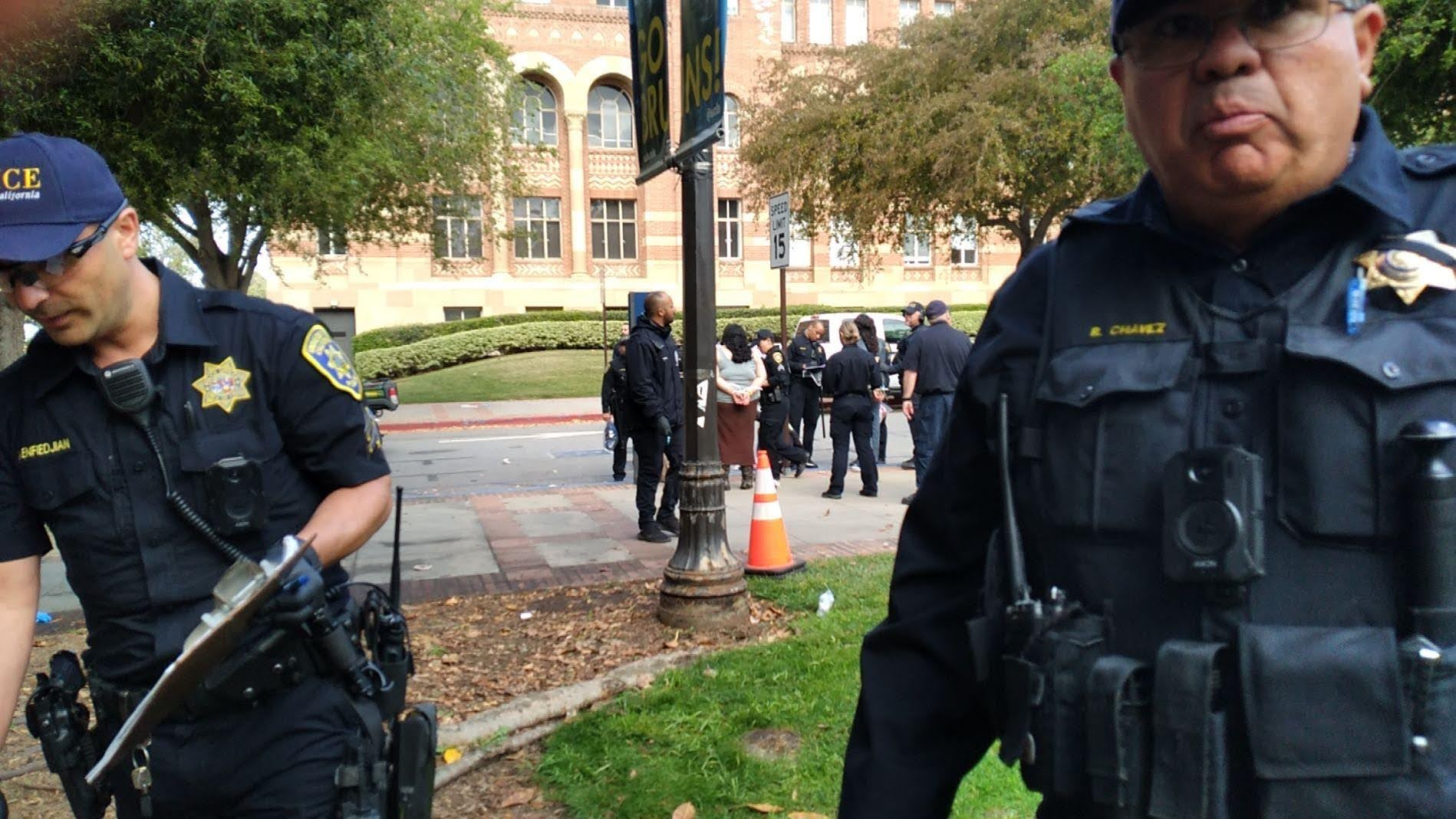
Los Angeles Police Department arresting student protestors, May 2, 2024

Following the previous night's dispersal order, an estimated 200 to 400 students remained on campus. At around 1:30 a.m. on May 2, LAPD officers broke into the encampment but were forced to retreat after they were outnumbered. After an hour, officers of the California Highway Patrol equipped in riot gear arrived at the campus to confront the protesters. Police reportedly fired a stun grenade, surrounded the encampment from all four sides, and began tearing down its walls, arresting 210 protestors for failure to disperse, reportedly including at least one professor. Police were seen firing rubber bullets at the student protestors and methodically dismantling the encampment, that was cleared by the morning.

== Additional protests post-occupation ==
=== May 6 ===
On the morning of Monday, May 6, UCPD arrested 44 pro-Palestine protestors, 35 of whom were students, in Parking Lot 2. Four of those arrested were previously arrested in the May 2 raid on the encampment. Police found "bolt cutters, super glue, padlocks and other items that indicated [that the protestors had] intended to vandalize and occupy a building on campus." 42 of the protestors were charged with "conspiracy to commit a crime" with the other two "for obstructing a peace officer"

In parallel, approximately 50 protestors staged a sit-in protest at Moore Hall. UCPD responded by closing the building, after which the protestors moved to Dodd Hall. The protestors then moved to Bruin Plaza to continue their protest. A person claiming to speak for behalf of the local chapter of the Students for Justice in Palestine group told the Daily Bruin that the group would not allow for business as usual to continue at the university, and they wanted to "disrupt the university’s finances".

On the same day, UAW Local 4811, the chapter representing over 48,000 University of California workers under the United Auto Workers union, issued an authorization to vote for a strike, with the vote scheduled to take place May 13 thru 15.

=== May 23 ===
On the morning of May 23, the day that chancellor Block testified in front of the House Education Committee, a small group of protesters set up a small encampment on the patio of Kerckhoff Hall. The number of protesters eventually reached several hundreds within a few hours. In the early afternoon, the UCPD issued a dispersal order and the protestors voluntarily left, marching towards the administration building, Murphy Hall, where they were joined by several hundred other protestors. With security denying access to the protestors to Murphy Hall, the protestors crossed the street to Dodd Hall. Some protestors were able to enter Dodd Hall, where they barricaded themselves, with the rest of the protestors blocking access to the building. Some counter-protestors attempted to enter Dodd Hall, but were denied entry by the protestors. In the late afternoon, the protestors decided to leave voluntarily just prior to the police entering the building through a back entrance. No arrests were made, and there were no reports of injuries.

=== June 10 ===
Protesters set up an encampment at Dickson Plaza and dyed a nearby fountain red. Police arrested 25 people. Protesters had attempted to set up an encampment at Janns Steps. When they were dispersed by police, they attempted to set up an encampment at Kerckhoff patio. After the police warned them again, they attempted to set up at Dodd Hall and the School of Law where police shot rubber bullets at them.

=== October 21 ===
On October 21, 2024 local chapters of Jewish Voice for Peace and Students for Justice in Palestine erected a Sukkah at Dickson Court to protest the Gaza war. Organizers had intended to keep the sukkah up for 7 days, commensurate with the Jewish holiday of Sukkot lasting 7 days. (Note: In 2024, the Sukkot holiday began 5 days earlier, on October 16.) Some protestors also set up tents around the sukkah. By nightfall, when the UCPD dispersed the protest, the encampment grew to 40 protestors with about 30 counter-protestors heckling the protestors. One person was arrested for failure to dispurse.

== Responses ==
Following the attack on the encampment by Pro-Israel counter-protestors on May 1, California governor Gavin Newsom stated, "The limited and delayed campus law enforcement response at UCLA last night was unacceptable — and it demands answers". Los Angeles Mayor Karen Bass released a statement saying police had responded to a request from UCLA administration, later describing the violence as "abhorrent". Following the police storming of the encampment, U.S. president Joe Biden said he supported law enforcement, stating, "We’re a civil society and order must prevail".

Criticizing Biden's rhetoric, Piper French wrote in The New York Review of Books that "Biden and university leaders like Block were calling this wave of campus protest violent not because it posed any inherent threat to anyone's safety but because they saw it as an intolerable provocation—one that might, in turn, require violence to quell."

In late-May 2024, the UCLA chief of police was removed from his post. In November 2024, the L.A. Police Commission found that a lack of communication between UCLA, the LAPD, and the California Highway Patrol had contributed to the failed response to the April 30 attack on campus.

=== At UCLA ===
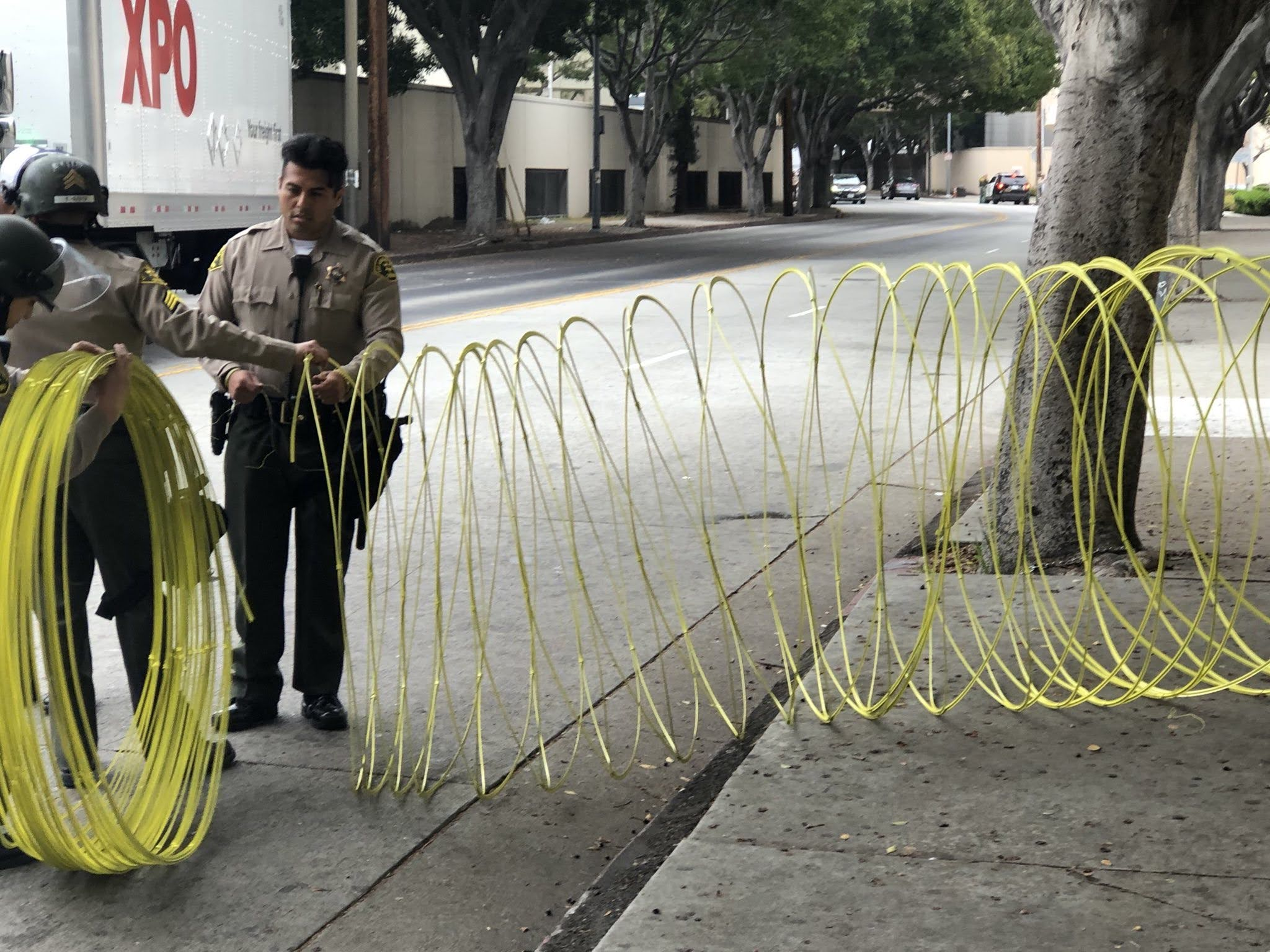
California Highway Patrol officers fencing off the Quad, May 2, 2024

In a statement, the protesters said, "The life-threatening assault we face tonight is nothing less than a horrifying, despicable act of terror. Law enforcement simply stood at the edge of the lawn and refused to budge as we screamed for their help." One student speaking to CNN stated, "The police the university had hired, the private security guards, stared and watched as this happened". Another student speaking to The Guardian said after being twice hit over the head, he "was left with stitches on his forehead and 14 staples in the back of his head". The editorial board for the student newspaper, The Daily Bruin, released an op-ed condemning the university for failing to protect students and the encampment.

UCLA Chancellor Gene Block released a statement denouncing the May 1 conflict, stating "this attack on our students, faculty and community members was utterly unacceptable", describing the counter-protesters who attacked the encampment as "instigators".

Faculty condemned the lack of a response to the counter-protestors, including Ananya Roy, who said, "The word is out they can do this repeatedly and get away with it. I am ashamed of my university. A UCLA professor of Jewish history, David N. Myers, stated that "some of the attackers appeared to be carrying Israeli flags and other pro-Israel symbols", in reference to the violence.

The administration released an email statement saying that they were "sickened" by the violence and that they called law enforcement to help control the situation. UCLA cancelled classes and alerted students that there would be "law enforcement presence stationed throughout campus." Remote instruction was announced for Thursday and Friday classes. Faculty members of the History Department released a statement condemning the violent attacks on the students and called for the UCLA Chancellor as well as the UC President to be held accountable for their inaction. The Faculty for Justice in Palestine chapter at UCLA called for a labor strike on May 2, 2024. UAW Local 4811, the union representing over 48,000 academic workers at the 11 UC campuses announced that it would hold a strike authorization vote within a week in response to the violence against students at UCLA. The UCLA branch of Hillel International, an organization that supports Jewish life and Israel on student campuses released an unsigned statement condemning the violent attack on all students and requesting off-campus Jewish community to stay away from on-campus protests.

On May 16, the UCLA Faculty's Academic Senate voted on a no confidence vote and resolution to censure Chancellor Block over his handling of the violence committed by counterprotesters against the encampment on April 30. Both resolutions were defeated with 43% votes in favor of no confidence, and 50% in favor of censure.

On May 22, the UCLA Police Chief John Thomas, who was under intense criticism for the slow response to the violence against the encampment on April 30, was removed and replaced while the University studies its security procedures.

In March 2025, UCLA banned the Students for Justice in Palestine student organization.

=== Labor strike ===
On May 20 the United Auto Workers Local 4811 representing teaching assistants and research assistants throughout the University of California launched a rotating strike in which each day a different campus would strike. On May 28 the rotating strike arrived at UCLA.

=== Legal proceedings ===
On May 24, the UCLA Police Department arrested an 18-year old Beverly Hills High School student named Edan On on suspicion of assault with a deadly weapon. Police said that On was recorded attacking the pro-Palestinian encampment at UCLA during the pro-Israel counter-protest. On was booked on a felony charge and held on a $30,000 bail. CNN had identified On along with other counter-protesters through a review of hundreds of hours of videos, social media posts and interviews. The UCLA Police Department also conducted their own investigation which included interviewing victims and witnesses and reviewing security camera footage and social media videos from members of the public and media.

On June 21, the office of the Los Angeles County District Attorney declined to press felony charges against Edan On, and referred the case to the Los Angeles City Attorney for possible misdemeanor charges. In declining to file felony charges, the district attorney cited lack of evidence that On's conduct directly resulted in any injuries, nor any evidence of conspiracy.

On April 25, 2025, L.A. City Attorney Hydee Feldstein Soto announced that criminal charges would be filed against Edan On and Matthew Katz. No other criminal charges were filed as a result of the protests.

=== Gene Block congressional testimony ===
On 23 May 2024, UCLA Chancellor Gene Block testified at the House Education Committee. During Block's testimony, U.S. Representative Ilhan Omar stated, "You, the UCLA leadership and law enforcement stood by for hours as the mob of agitators gathered near the encampment with the clear intention to cause violence".

== Media coverage ==
In an op-ed in The Guardian, activist Judith Levine criticized U.S. media coverage of the counter-protester attack, particularly outlets' refraining from assigning blame and for using the passive voice.

On May 1, the day after the counter-protester violence, Dr. Phil filmed segments for his syndicated talk show at the encampment.

On May 16, CNN published an investigative piece where they attempted to identify those that participated in the attack on the encampment, based on posted social media, footage, and interviews. Several individuals were identified by name in the piece, including Edan On, Malachi Marlan-Librett, and Tom Bibiyan. On's mother had praised his actions on her Facebook account, writing in Hebrew: “Edan went to bully the Palestinian students in the tents at UCLA and played the song that they played to the Nukhba terrorists in prison!” She confirmed him to be a participant to CNN and said that he planned to enlist in the IDF. However, she later denied that her son had been at the encampment. On May 23, the UCLA Police Department arrested Edan On on suspicion of assault with a deadly weapon, a felony charge. On was “was seen on video assaulting encampment occupants with a wooden pole” according to a statement released to CNN.

== Civil lawsuits ==
In early June 2024, three Jewish UCLA students filed a lawsuit in a Los Angeles federal court against the Regents of the University of California for allowing protesters to prevent the Jewish students from accessing certain areas of the campus "unless they agreed to disavow Israel’s right to exist." The university claimed that it was not responsible for the civil rights violations because the violations were committed by the protestors, rather than directly by the university.

On August 13, Judge Mark Scarsi issued a preliminary injunction in favor of the Jewish students, saying that the university cannot allow protestors to violate the civil rights of Jewish students by blocking them from accessing certain areas within the campus for holding faith-based views. Judge Scarsi said that it was "unimaginable" and "abhorrent" for Jewish students to be unable to use parts of the university campus, including Powell Library, "because they refused to denounce their faith". The ruling effectively requires the university to either ensure that Jewish students are "fully and equally" able to participate in all parts of the school that are ordinarily open to students, or to close those programs and places for all students. UCLA responded that the ruling "would improperly hamstring [its] ability to respond to events on the ground and to meet the needs of [its] community."

A separate lawsuit was also filed in June by a student who by that time had already graduated. In his lawsuit against UCLA, the student, Milagro Jones, blamed the university for an assault he suffered by the protestors at the encampment. Jones faulted UCLA for not acting soon enough to shut down the encampment. Although Jones is not Jewish, he was nonetheless accused by the protestors of being a Zionist.

== See also ==
- 2024 University of Southern California pro-Palestinian campus occupation
- 2024 University of Oregon pro-Palestinian campus occupation
- 2024 University of Virginia pro-Palestinian campus occupation
- Boycott, Divestment and Sanctions
- History of the University of California, Los Angeles § Student unrest - Vietnam era
