= 2024 University of Southern California pro-Palestinian campus occupation =

2024 occupation protest in Los Angeles, California

2024 USC pro-Palestinian campus occupation
- Part of Gaza war protests (in the US at universities (in 2024 (in the US (in California))))
- Date: April 24 – May 5, 2024 (1 week and 4 days)
- Location: Los Angeles, California, United States

Casualties
- Arrested: 93

On April 24, 2024, an occupation protest began at the University of Southern California (USC) in Los Angeles, California. The protest was a part of pro-Palestinian protests on university campuses campaigning for divestment from Israel. USC cancelled their main commencement ceremony over safety concerns about protests. The encampment was cleared by the Los Angeles Police Department on the morning of May 5.

== Background ==
On April 17, protesters at Columbia University had begun an occupation protest on its campus to protest the university's investments in Israel amid the Gaza war. The protest, as well as the police response, sparked nationwide protests at university campuses.

On April 15, USC announced they would cancel the upcoming commencement speech by pro-Palestinian valedictorian Asna Tabassum, citing security concerns. Provost and Senior Vice President for Academic Affairs Andrew T. Guzman stated the decision came after debate over Tabassum being chosen to give the speech took on an "alarming tenor", saying it would have posed a security risk. The Council on American-Islamic Relations condemned the speech's cancellation. Days later the school also cancelled the planned commencement speech by director Jon M. Chu, as well as the planned granting of honorary degrees to Billie Jean King, Maria Rosario Jackson, and Marcia McNutt.

== Timeline ==
=== April 24 ===
The encampment was set up at Alumni Park on April 24. Officers from the USC Police and the Los Angeles Police Department arrested 93 people on the first night of the protest. In addition, USC closed off campus to the general public.

=== April 25 ===
USC announced they would cancel their main graduation ceremony. The university later announced they would hold a "Trojan Family" event for graduates at Los Angeles Memorial Coliseum. The event was set for May 9, a day before when the graduation was scheduled.

=== May 5 ===
Around a hundred LAPD officers raided and cleared the encampment at approximately 4:00 a.m. on Sunday, May 5. No arrests were made.

== See also ==
- 2024 Israel–Hamas war protests on university campuses in the United States
- 2024 University of California, Los Angeles pro-Palestinian campus occupation
- Boycott, Divestment and Sanctions
- Student protest
