= List of Gaza war protests at universities in California in 2024 =

List of pro-Palestinian protests on university campuses in California in 2024
- Part of Gaza war protests (in the US • at universities (in 2024 (in the US)))
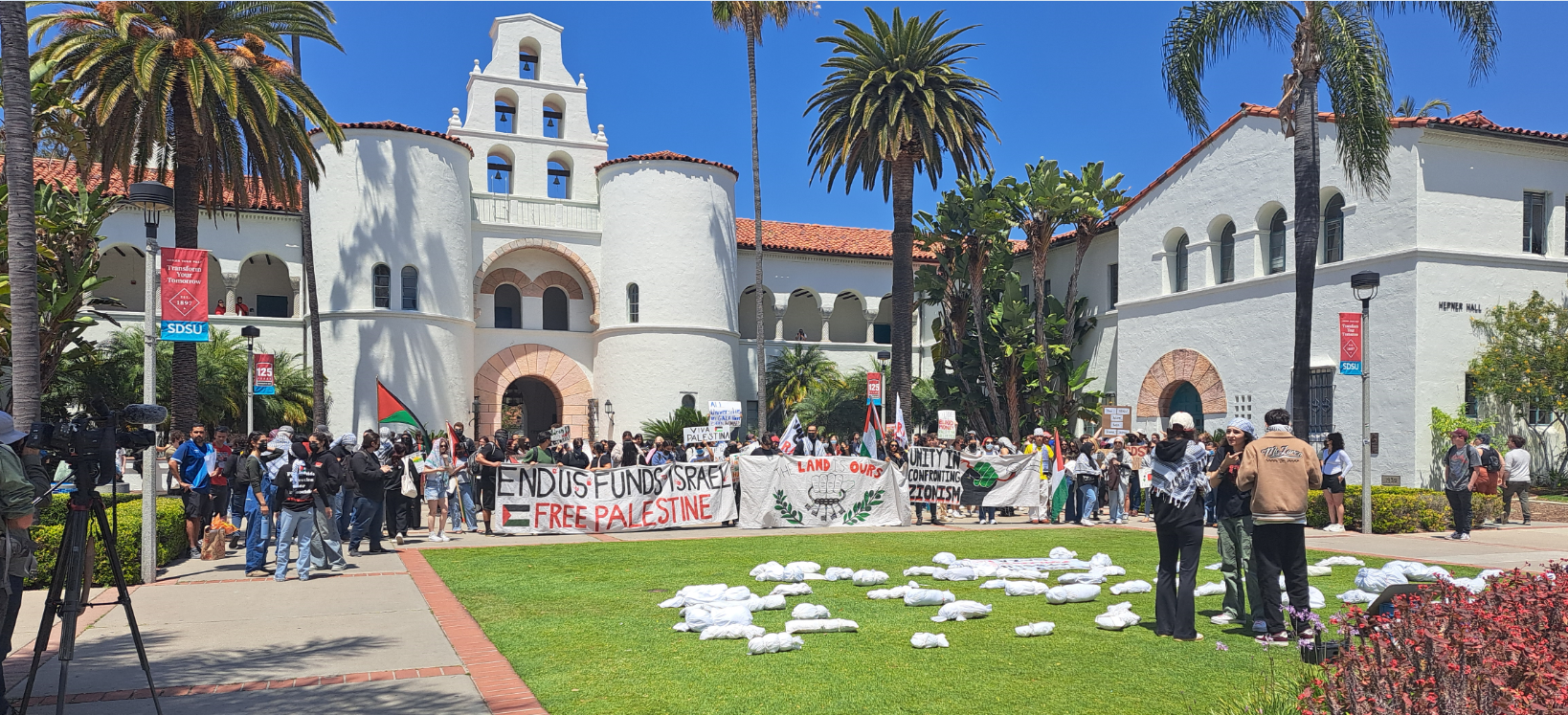
- San Diego State University, April 30, 2024
- Date: April 17, 2024 – present
- Location: California, United States
- Goals: Universities divestment from Israel
- Methods: Protests; Civil disobedience; Occupation; Picketing; Stand-up strikes; Hunger strike; Civil disorder

This is a list of pro-Palestinian protests on university campuses in California in 2024 since protests escalated at the Columbia University campus occupation on April 17. Campus protests initially spread the following week to Cal Poly Humboldt, UC Berkeley, and USC. On April 25, encampments and protests spread further to multiple universities; UCLA. UC Santa Barbara, UC Irvine, Stanford, and at Sonoma State the following day. On April 29, encampments were set up at San Francisco State, Sacramento State, UC Riverside, and Occidental College; and at UC San Diego and at the University of San Francisco on April 30.

In May, United Auto Workers local labor union authorized a stand-up strike against the University of California (UC) system alleging unsafe labor practices and violations of civil rights against the workers it represents. The first strike began on May 20 at UC Santa Cruz and expanded to other campuses weekly until a judge issued a restraining order on June 7.

In August, just before the opening of the fall semester, Cal State, UC and other universities instituted broad new policies banning encampments, barricades and overnight demonstrations in response to the events.

== Background ==
Universities in California with Gaza war protests since April 2024. Universities that had encampments are marked in green, and non-encampment protests are marked in blue.

By May 6, 2024, student protests had occurred in 45 of the 50 states in the United States and the District of Columbia, with encampments, occupations, walkouts or sit-ins on almost 140 campuses. Thirty-four encampments were established in the United Kingdom; across universities in Australia, beginning with the University of Sydney; and in Canada, including an encampment at McGill University. On May 7, protests spread further on European campuses after mass arrests at the University of Amsterdam campus occupation, including occupation of campus buildings at Leipzig University in Germany, Sciences Po in France, and Ghent University in Belgium. By May 8, protests had taken place in more than 25 countries, and on May 13, approximately 1,000 Dutch students and university staff took part in a national walk-out.

== University of California ==
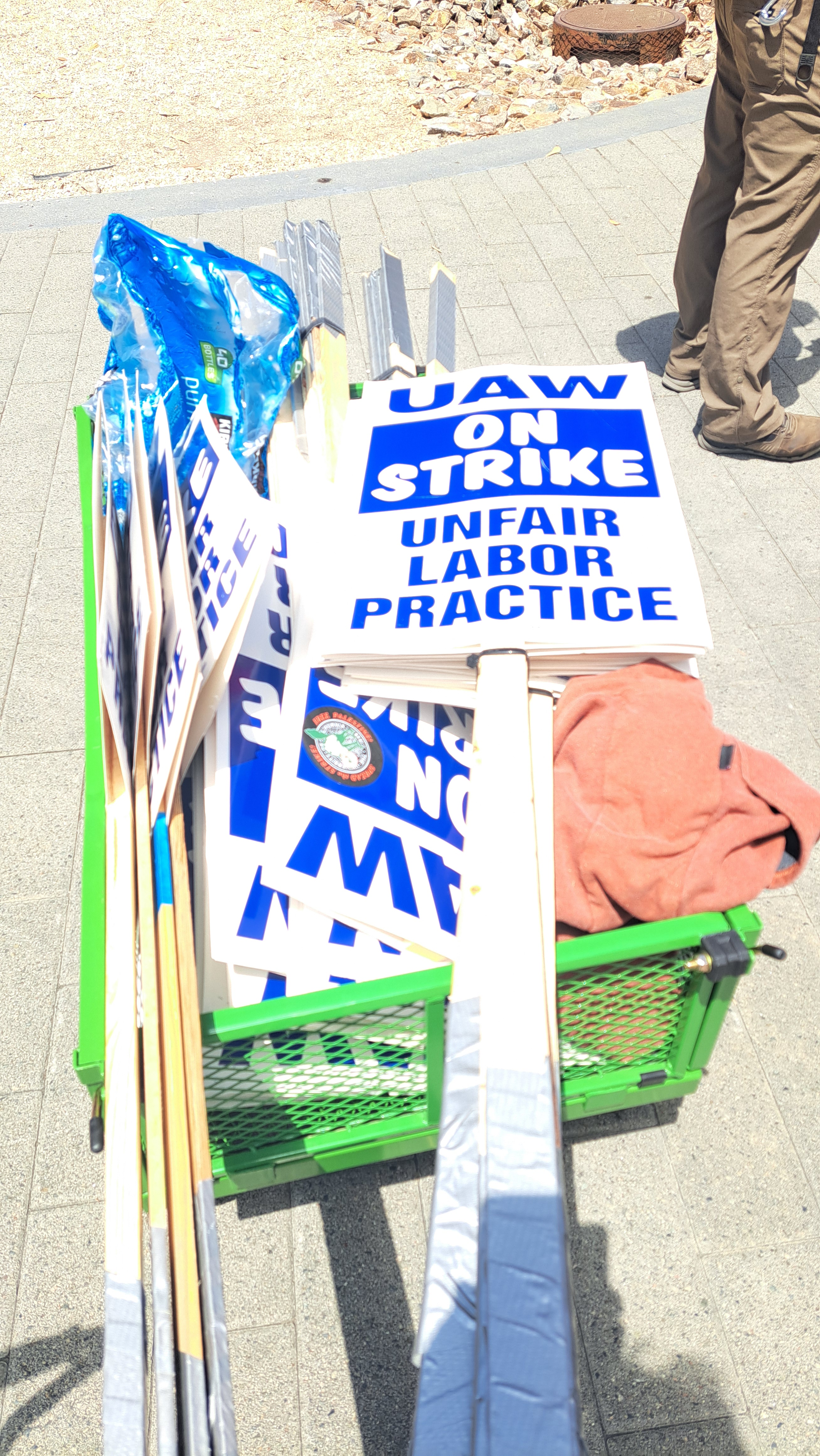
"UAW ON Strike" signs

=== Strike ===
On May 15, members of United Auto Workers Local 4811, the union representing 48,000 graduate students on 10 campuses in the University of California system voted to authorize a strike because the university unfairly change policies and discriminated against students who were exercising their right to free speech and created an unsafe work environment by allowing attacks on protesters. The authorization does not guarantee a strike, but allows the executive board to call a stand up strike at any time. The first of such strikes began on May 20 at UC Santa Cruz, by academic workers over; labor practices, the police response to the protests, and the arrest of union members involved in protests. The University applied to the state labor board for an injunction against the strike, but it was rejected on May 23. On May 28, the second week of rolling strikes began at UC Davis and UCLA. The third week of the strike is scheduled to begin on June 3 at UC San Diego, UC Santa Barbara and UC Irvine.

On June 3, the associate vice president for systemwide labor relations at UC stated: "UC will file a breach of contract action against UAW in state court as a next step." The same day, the Public Employment Relations Board rejected UC's call for an inunction a second time. The request did not meet the high burden of irreparable harm if the strike is allowed to continue.

On June 7, an Orange County Superior Court Judge issued a temporary restraining order to end the strike.

In September, the Council of University of California Faculty Associations filed an unfair labor practices complaint with California's Public Employment Relations Board against UC administrators, alleging "relentless campaign" to retaliate against faculty members for supporting the strike and "teaching about the war in a way that does not align with the university's position."

=== UC Berkeley ===
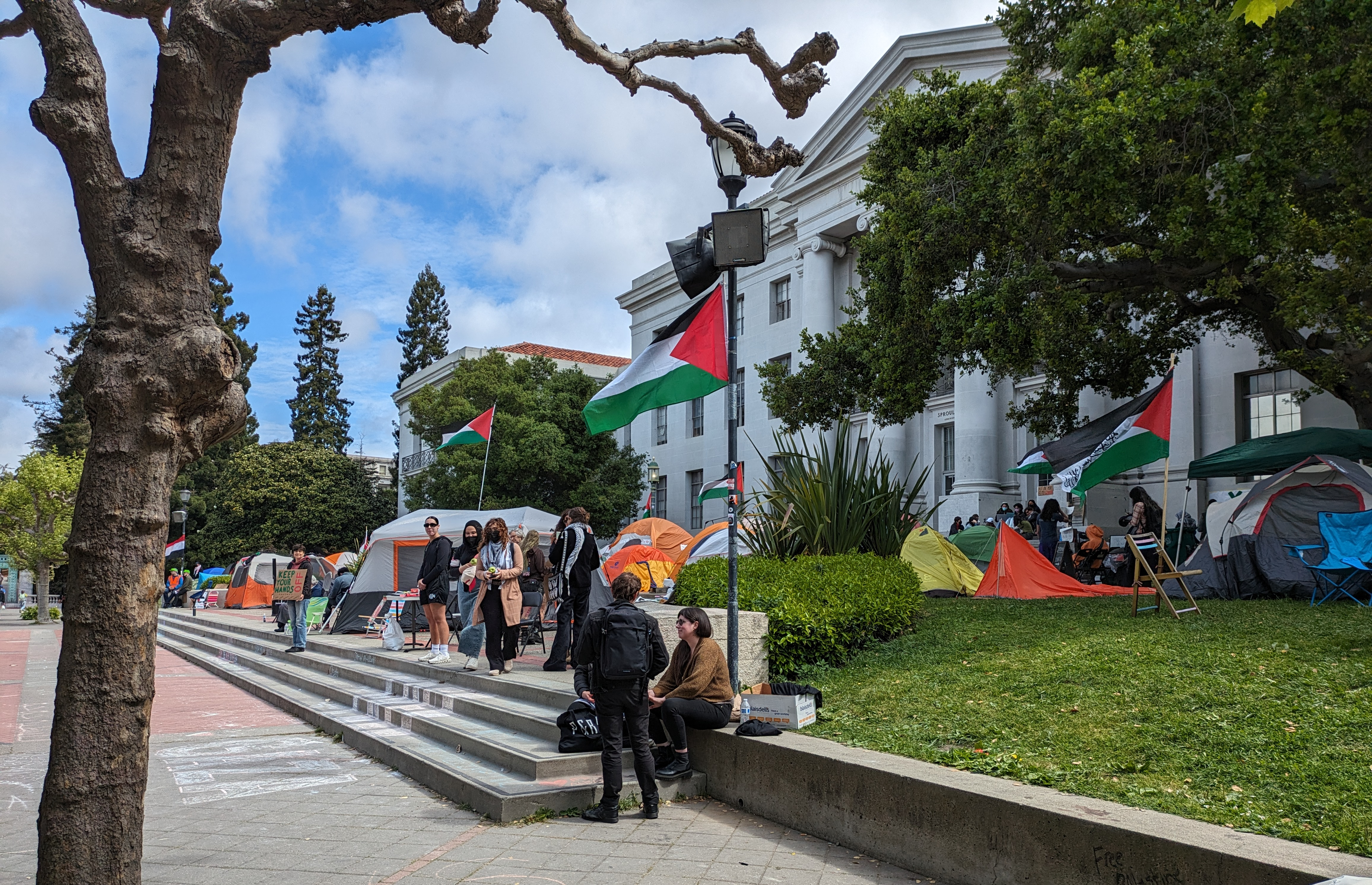
Encampment at UC Berkeley on April 25, 2024

Student protesters put up more than a dozen tents on Sproul Plaza at University of California, Berkeley, stating they would remain until the university divested from companies involved with the war. University officials pledged to remove protesters who put up tents or "disrupted academic activity" by force. On May 14, the encampment at Sproul Plaza was dismantled by protesters after reaching an agreement with chancellor Carol Christ to begin efforts to secure a permanent ceasefire.

On May 15, protesters setup an encampment at an abandoned building at the Anna Head complex on campus. On May 16, at least a dozen protesters were arrested by police from multiple jurisdictions. The occupied building was 130 years old and a member of a local preservation society raised concerns that it might be irreparably damaged.

=== UC Davis ===
On May 1, a protest was also held at the University of California, Davis. On May 6, an encampment was set up at UC Davis. On May 29, the 23rd day of the encampment, academic workers with UAW local 4811 went on strike as part of the UC system-wide standup strike.

=== UC Irvine ===
A protest march was held at the University of California, Irvine on April 25, followed by an encampment on April 29.

On May 15, over 40 protesters at UC Irvine were arrested after they briefly occupied a lecture hall. Responding agencies included UCI Police, CHP, Orange County Sheriff's Department, and local police from Santa Ana, Fullerton and the city of Orange. The solidarity encampment was dismantled and classes were cancelled the next day.

=== UCLA ===
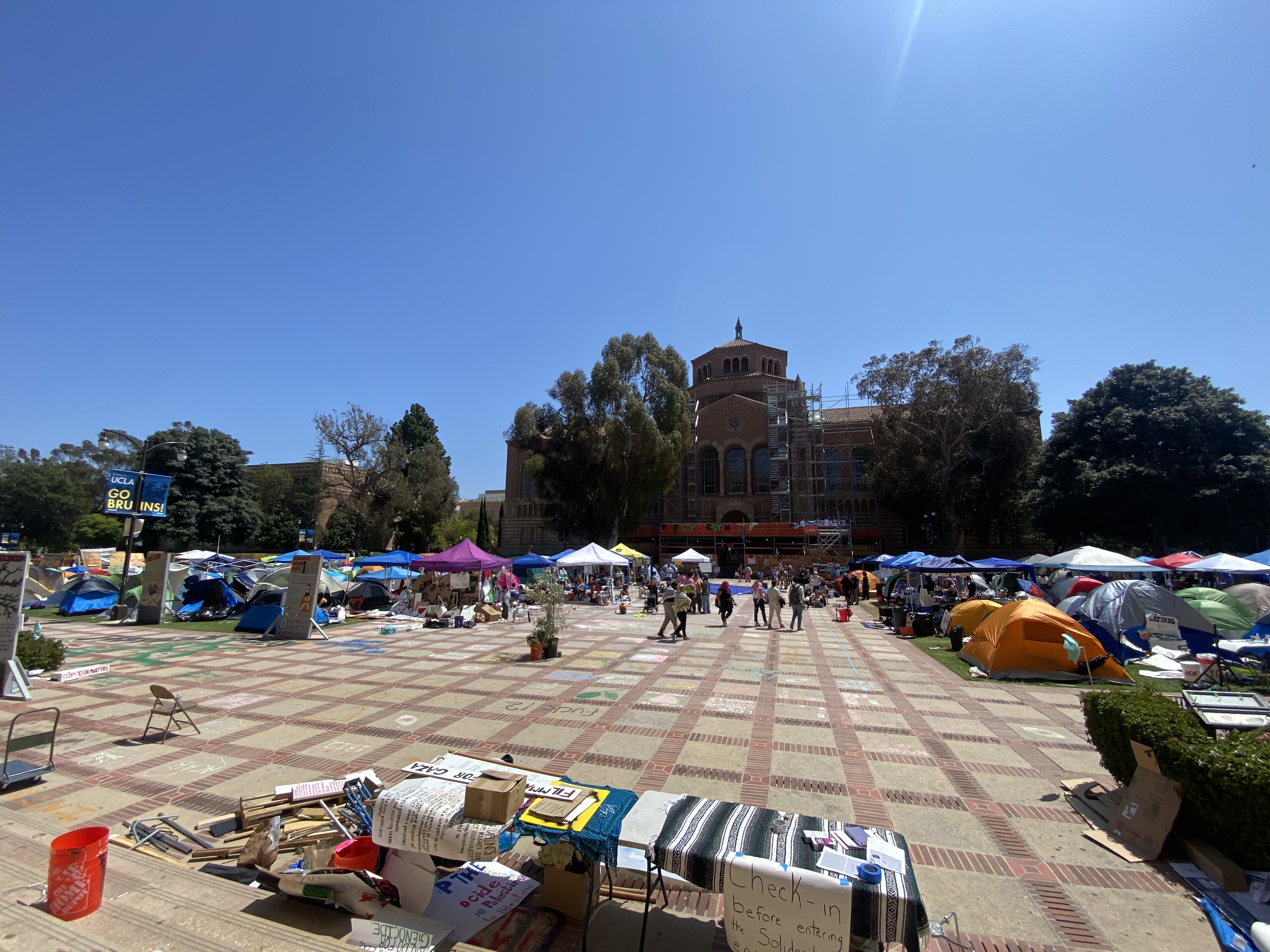
UCLA pro-Palestinian encampment looking toward Powell Library from Royce Hall on April 30, 2024

On April 25, The University of California, Los Angeles (UCLA) chapter of SJP set up a "Gaza Solidarity Encampment" between Powell Library and Royce Hall. Social media posts announcing the encampment directly referenced the arrests at USC, and aerial footage showed about 20 tents and a few hundred protesters. On April 28, clashes occurred between pro-Palestinian and pro-Israel protesters as Stand With Us rallied on the campus, in a protest organized by the Israeli American Council. On April 29, counter protestors threw live mice at the encampment. In response to the attack, the Council on American–Islamic Relations called on UCLA administration to investigate it as a hate crime.

In the early morning of May 1, pro-Israel counter protesters from outside the campus attacked the pro-Palestinian protesters' barricade, in an attempt to tear down the encampment. The group included people wielding sticks, poles, and metal fencing. The group also used fireworks and pepper spray, and bear spray during the attack. The LAPD allowed attacks on the encampment by counterprotestors to continue for four hours before intervening. During the attack, the pro-Israel group chanted "Second Nakba," referring to the expulsion of Palestinians from their homes by Israeli forces in 1948. The following day, police dismantled the encampment, arresting 132 protesters and shooting multiple protestors at close range with rubber bullets. On May 28, academic workers at UCLA joined the UC system wide rolling strike.

On June 11, protesters attempted to re-establish encampments at UCLA but were met by more rubber bullets.

=== UC Merced ===
On May 3, students at University of California, Merced held a letter writing event addressed to the Regents of the University of California to protest their dissent about the Palestine issue.

On May 12, student SJP organizers at UC Merced set up an encampment in anticipation of a meeting by the Regents of the University of California in the university. On May 15, during the 2nd day of the Board of Regents meeting, the students were joined by students from the University of California, Berkeley, alongside other groups from the San Francisco Bay Area, totaling the encampment to over 100 people. On May 16, six members of the Board of Regents met with protestors in the student encampment to discuss divestment from companies with ties to Israel.

=== UC Riverside ===
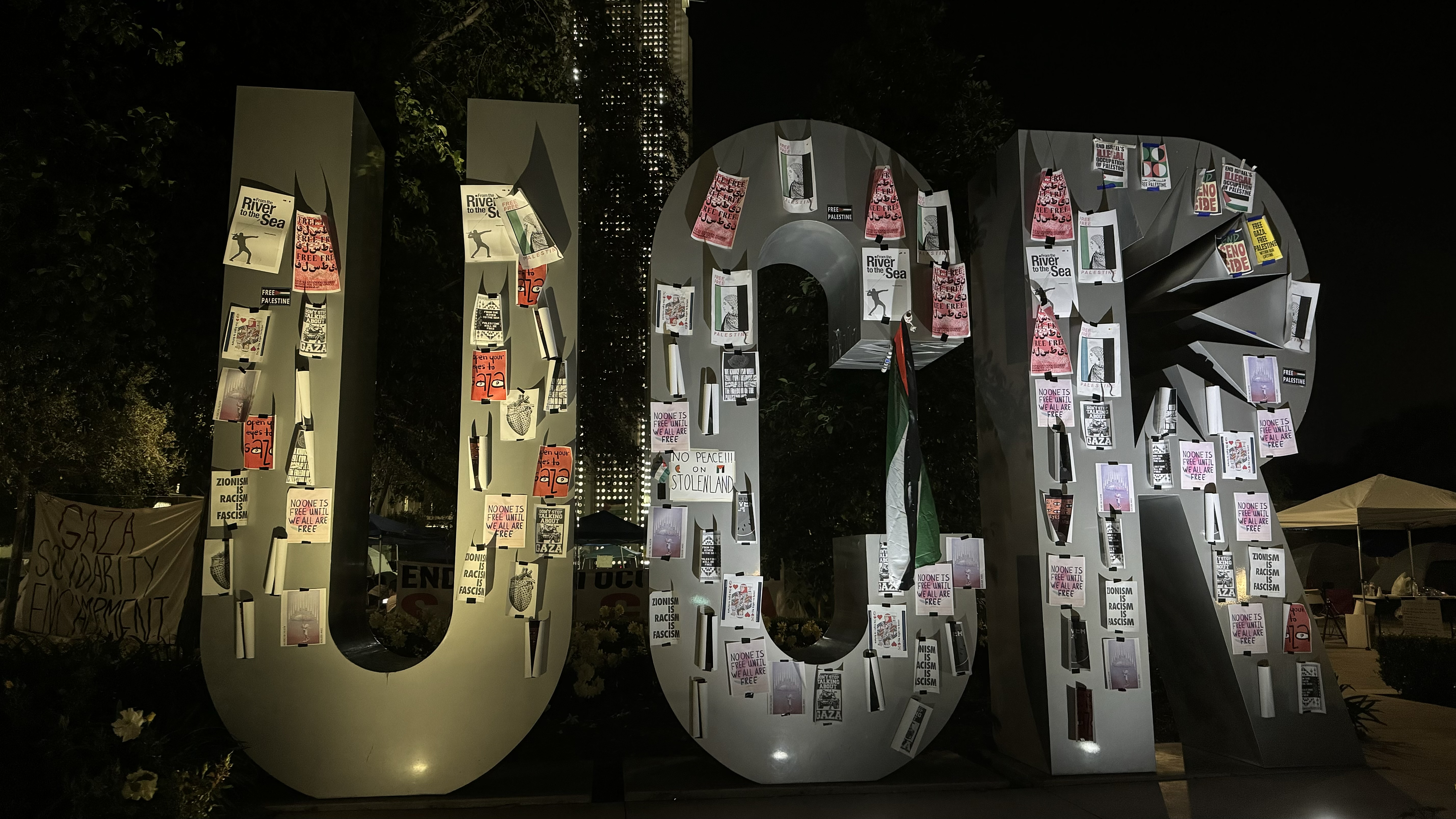
The UCR statue at UC Riverside adorned with pro-Palestine and anti-Zionist symbols

On April 29, encampments were set up at the University of California, Riverside,

On May 3, UC Riverside announced that the university will create a task force which will explore the removal of the university's endowment from the UC Investments Office with consideration of companies involved in arms manufacturing and delivery and to present a report to the university's board of trustees by the end of the Winter 2025 quarter. The university also announced that its School of Business will terminate its trips to Israel, (Note: Although the agreement included other places as well, the School of Business had ceased to conduct trips to those places years prior but included them into the agreement) and that the university will modify its approval process for all study abroad programs to ensure their compliance with the university's anti-discrimination policies. In turn, protest organizers have agreed to end the occupation of the area around the bell tower by that midnight.

=== UC San Diego ===
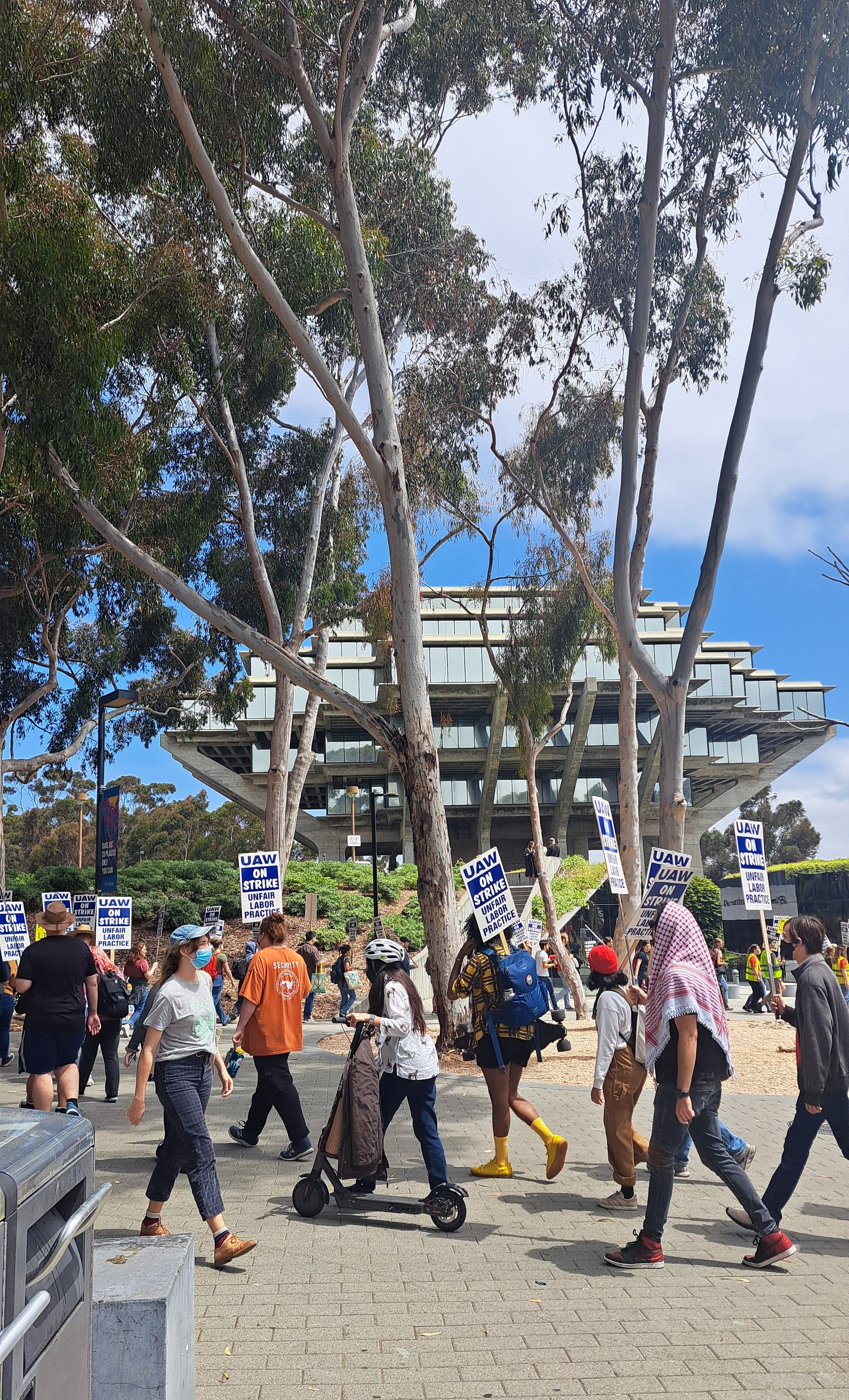
UAW strike outside of Geisel Library at UC San Diego

On May 1, an encampment was established at the University of California, San Diego.

On May 6, more than 100 police officers cleared the encampment at UC San Diego, arresting at least 64 people. The students in the group were immediately suspended. That afternoon a large protest started gathering at Price Center on campus. Another protest demanding the release of the students outside of the San Diego County Jail downtown numbered in the hundreds.

On May 8, thousands of students at UCSD held a walkout to protest the 64 arrested during the clearing of the encampment earlier in the week. More than 100 demonstrators marched to Chancellor Pradeep Khosla's home off campus.

On May 13, "Tritons for Israel" hosted a speech by Mosab Hassan Yousef, a former Israeli undercover agent and son of a Hamas founder at UCSD. A coalition of religious leaders including the imam of the "Islamic Center of San Diego" condemning the speaker for "islamophobia." UCSD said it does not tolerate either islamophobia or anti-semitism, but it also cannot censor or ban groups because of the First Amendment.

On May 15, hundreds marched through UCSD to commemorate the 76th anniversary of Nakba, the displacement and ethnic cleansing that took place day after the state of Israel declared its independence.

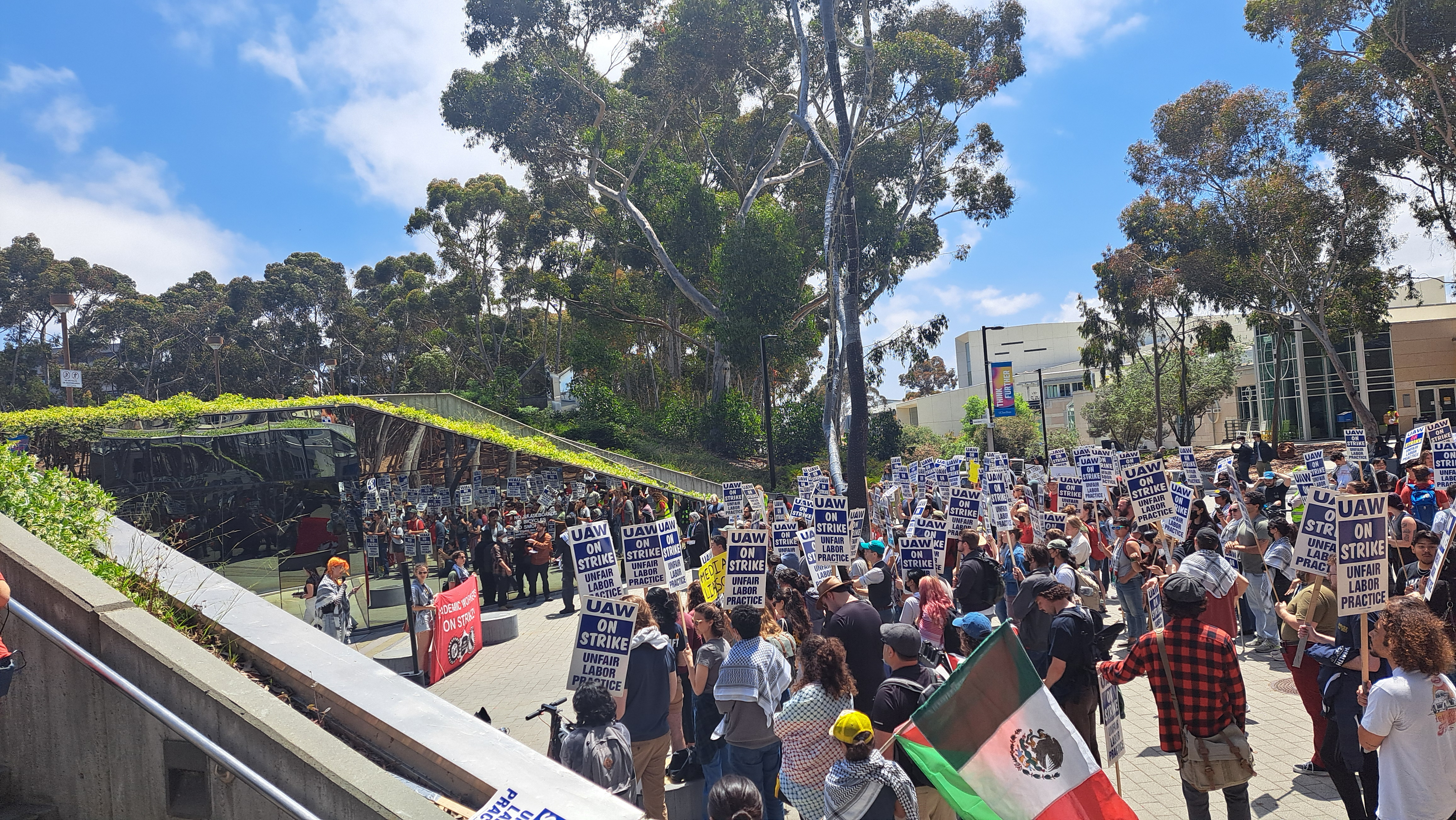
UAW strike, week 3, at UCSD

On May 16, the San Diego Faculty Association attempted to deliver two petitions to chancellor Pradeep Khosla calling for student amnesty and contradicting the University position that encampment members were violent, that the majority of the encampment was not made up of "outside agitators" and that they did not block the Library walk from non-protest related traffic. The petitioners were prevented from entering the building where his Khosla's office is believed to be.

On June 3, thousands of academic workers at UCSD joined week 3 of the UC-wide stand-up strike. Speakers rallied a crowd in front of Geisel Library followed by marching around campus. United Auto Workers called the strike because the University system "condoned and used violence against its own workers" when the police were used to take down encampments at various campuses including UCSD.

On June 17, lawyers negotiated with and received assurances from the San Diego City Attorney that none of the protesters arrested in May will have charges filed against them. The city reserved the right to file misdemeanor charges up to one year from the incident. Students still faced disciplinary charges from the University, and seven graduating students were prohibited from walking in the commencement ceremony.

By January 2025, UCSD had installed rows of hammocks on the field to discourage future encampments and removed inspirational signage like "This is Where You Make Waves" and "Let Your World Change this World" in favor of more benign language in response to the events of the previous spring.

=== UC San Francisco ===
An encampment was set up in front of the library at the University of California, San Francisco. On May 18, the university said the encampment was disbanded.

=== UC Santa Barbara ===
Hundreds of people occupied an administration building at the University of California, Santa Barbara on April 25; tents were set up inside the building but no occupation was planned, according to an organizer, and no police were present. On May 13, a die-in protest occurred in front of the Paseo West library. As of May 14, 105 tents were still standing at the encampment between North Hall and the Davidson Library.

On May 15, the student government president filed a complaint with the U.S. Department of Education's Office for Civil Rights over "severe and persistent anti-Semitic bullying and harassment on campus by her peers, based on her Jewish shared ancestry and ethnicity".

=== UC Santa Cruz ===
On May 1, two protests were held at the University of California, Santa Cruz. One was in support of labor reform while the other called for the University of California to divest. The two protests merged into a singular protest, which ended with an encampment being set up near a campus bookstore.

On May 10, students at the 10-day-old Gaza solidarity encampment at UC Santa Cruz's Quarry Plaza announced that negotiations with the university for long term divestment from Israel are breaking down and they are bracing for police violence.

On May 17, U.A.W. 4811 announced that about 2000 of their workers at UCSC would be the first to go on a stand-up strike starting Monday because of alleged infringements on the student's rights to free speech as well as Unfair labor practices. UCSC workers were the first to strike on May 20.

On May 31, police broke up the solidarity encampment. An estimated 117 demonstrators were arrested by police in riot gear.

== California State University ==
On August 15, the CSU system was the first in the state to issue new rules banning encampments, barricades and overnight encampments.

=== Cal Poly Humboldt ===
The campus of California State Polytechnic University, Humboldt in Northern California was shut down by officials on April 22 after students occupied two university buildings, Siemen's Hall and Nelson Hall East, and barricaded their entrances. On April 26, the university closed the campus for the remainder of the semester with classes conducted remotely due to the occupation. On April 30, police officers were invited to the campus to clear the encampment, 25 arrests were made.

On May 3, Cal Poly Humboldt announced that it would be holding it commencement ceremonies off-campus, and with increased security detail. On May 11, graffiti appeared on many of the schools' entrance gates, making them say "Cal Poly Humboldt Supports Genocide". Cal Poly Humboldt President President Tom Jackson Jr. did not attend any commencement ceremonies.

=== Cal Poly San Luis Obispo ===
On May 1, about 70 people participated in a die-in was held at California Polytechnic State University, San Luis Obispo. On May 9, more than a hundred students, faculty and staff held a walkout and another die-in on Dexter Lawn calling for a ceasefire and divestment. Protesters published a 25-page list of demands.

=== Cal Poly Pomona ===
On April 29 protests were held at California State Polytechnic University, Pomona.

=== Cal State Bakersfield ===
A march was held at California State University, Bakersfield on May 8. Prior to the protest, a lone doctoral student stood in front of the student holding a Palestinian flag until a crowd began to gather around her.

=== Cal State Channel Islands ===
An encampment was launched at California State University Channel Islands On May 13.

=== Cal State Fullerton ===
On April 29 protests organized by SJP were held at California State University, Fullerton. The protest took place a week after the Associated Students government body of CSUF unanimously adopted a resolution calling for a ceasefire in Gaza; and a day after another event organized by "Palestinian Christians for Justice" took place in town nearby.

More protests were held by Titan YDSA on May 8, and an all-day community session was held by SJP CSUF on May 9. The Titan YDSA protests led to the University administration sending out an email stating that it would not pursue divestment.

=== Cal State Long Beach ===
On May 2, hundreds marched in a protest at California State University, Long Beach. They renamed an administration building after Refaat Alareer, a Palestinian writer from Gaza who was killed by an Israeli air strike in December.

=== Cal State Los Angeles ===
On May 1, protests were held at California State University, Los Angeles, both in support of Palestine and for International Workers' Day. An encampment was set up the same day. On May 16, CSULA officials, including President Berenecea Eanes, met with protesters to discuss their demands for more transparency about the school's investments. In June 2024, students took over the student services building and barricaded it with golf carts and picnic tables.

=== Cal State Monterey Bay ===
A protest was held at California State University, Monterey Bay on May 6. About 50 protesters wearing keffiyehs marched for 45 minutes on quad and "practiced their encampment skills." The group demanded an investigation of Panetta Institute for Public Policy that was headquartered at CSUMB. Former United States Secretary of Defense Leon Panetta claimed that the institute he founded had "absolutely no connection with the Department of Defense.

=== Cal State Northridge ===
On May 1, protests were held at California State University, Northridge, both in support of Palestine and for International Workers' Day. Musician and leftist activist Tom Morello attended the protest and performed for students.

=== Cal State San Bernardino ===
On May 2, protests were held at California State University, San Bernardino.

=== Cal State San Marcos ===
On April 29, nearly 200 protesters, organized by SJP, held a rally in front of the Kellogg library at California State University San Marcos. Another rally organized by SJP took place on May 9. Pro-Israeli counter-protesters tried to engage with the pro-Palestinian group, but the protesters did not engage and the rally ended peacefully.

=== Chico State ===
On May 1, protests were held at California State University, Chico, both in support of Palestine and for International Workers' Day. On May 6, SJP and some other student organizations held a walkout and teach-in on campus. On May 9, Chico State Academic Senate passed two resolutions calling for a ceasefire in Palestine.

=== Fresno State ===
On May 1, protests were held at California State University, Fresno, both in support of Palestine and for International Workers' Day.

On May 3, around 250 held a sit-in protest, organized by Students for Palestine Liberation, at the "peace garden" at Fresno State.

=== Sacramento State ===
On April 29, encampments were set up at California State University, Sacramento.

Sacramento State President J. Luke Wood declared that while they did not currently have any investments that profit from genocide, they would be making an annual review of such investments in the future. Students at the encampment were permitted to stay until midnight on May 8.

On May 17, an eight-day old encampment was ended by protesters after negotiations with the administration took place. Wood did not immediately disclose the terms of the agreement, citing preoccupation with the upcoming commencement ceremony.

=== San Diego State ===
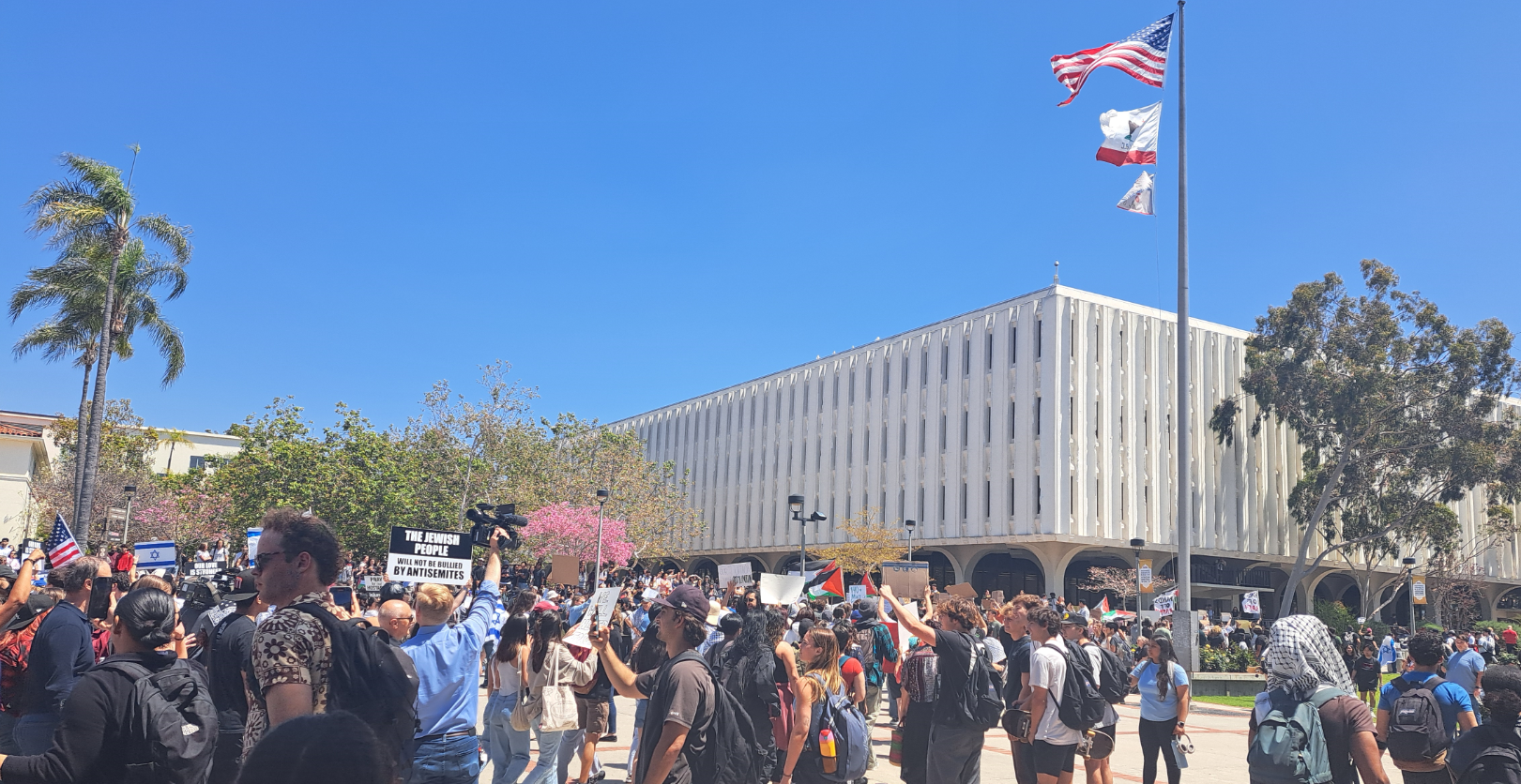
Pro-Palestinians march through counter-protesters on the commons at San Diego State University.

On April 30, Students for Justice in Palestine organized a walkout at San Diego State University to protest spending on "weapons corporations that kill Palestinians." About 1,000 people rallied near Hepner Hall and marched to the Student union without incident.

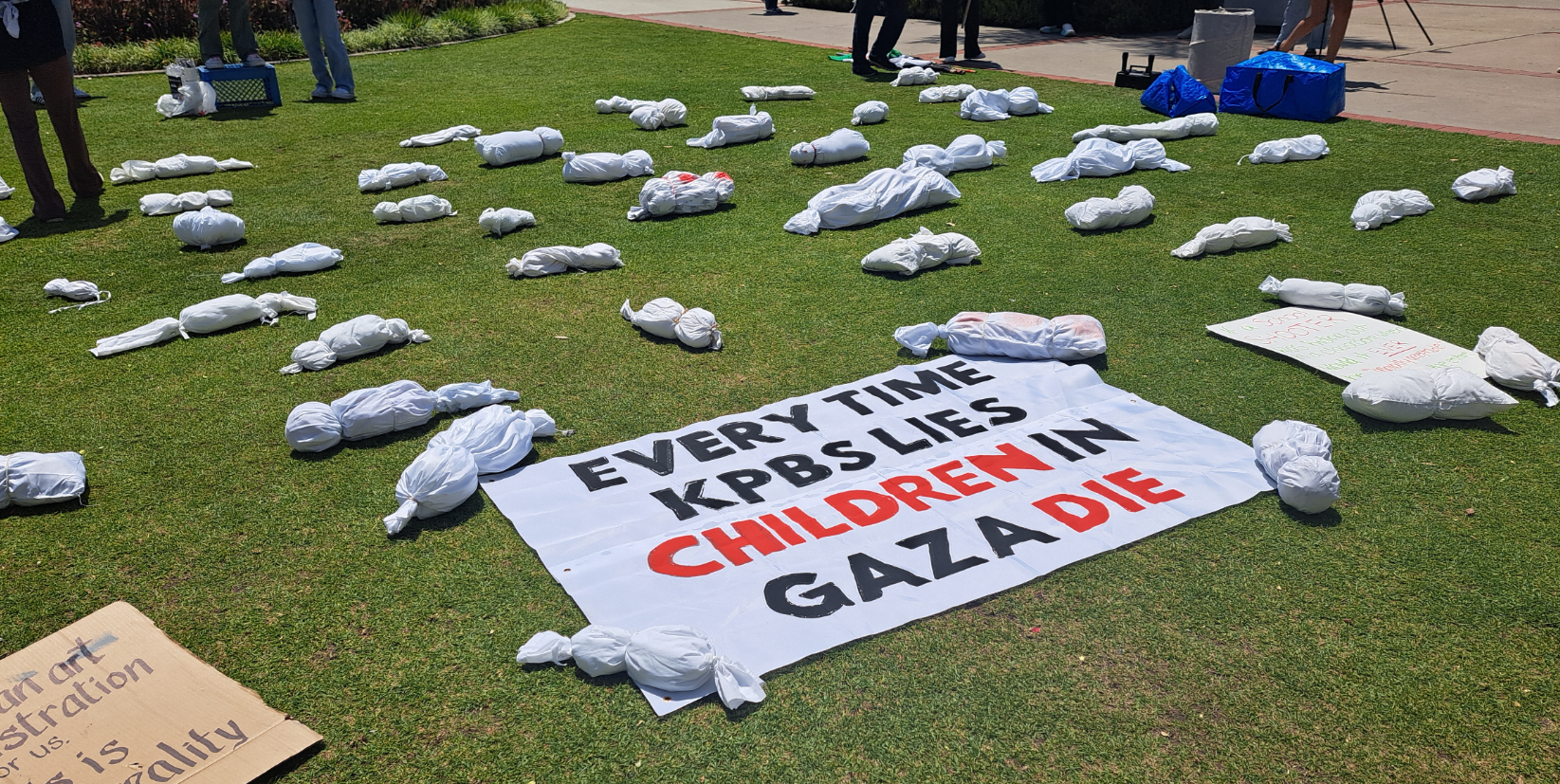
Protest art on the campus of San Diego State University where KPBS studios broadcast from

=== San Francisco State ===
On April 29, an encampment was established at Malcolm X Plaza at San Francisco State University. On May 13, President Lynn Mahoney announced: "We will support the addition of a human rights-based investment strategy, including divesting from direct investments in weapons manufacturers and limiting other such indirect investments." Students then began to dismantle the fifteen day old encampment.

=== San José State ===
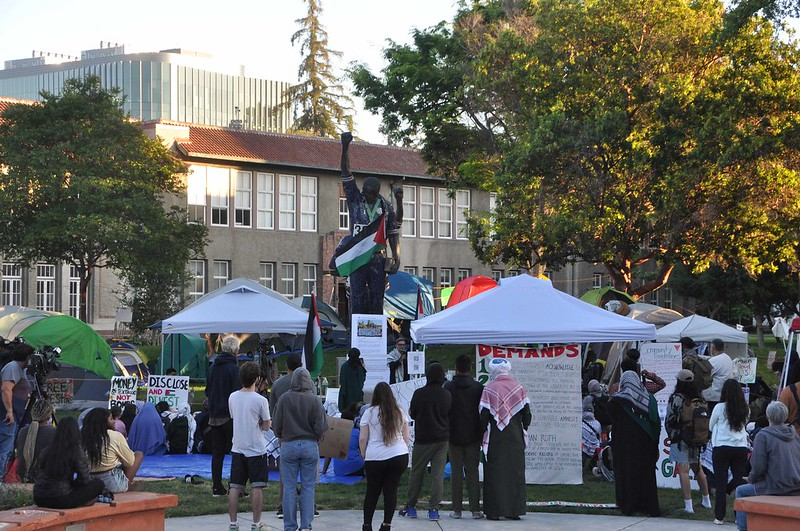
The 2024 pro-Palestine encampment surrounding Victory Salute at San Jose State University

On October 12, 2023, after the Hamas-led attack on Israel and subsequent Gaza war, the San Jose State University chapter of Students for Justice in Palestine organized a protest consisting of speeches given at Victory Salute, followed by a march around the campus.

In April 2024, following the campus occupation at Columbia University, student protestors began demanding that San Jose State divest from Israel over its genocide of Palestinians. The university's Associated Students board unanimously adopted a measure to boycott Silicon Valley companies involved in pro-Israeli activity on April 24.

Protests continued on campus, when on May 13, an encampment was established on the lawn around Victory Salute. One of the encampment's demands was the firing of history professor Johnathan Roth after a physical altercation between himself and a pro-Palestine protestor in February 2024. On May 14, the University communicated with the protestors about their demands but asserted that the encampment had to be disbanded before finals began on May 15. Additionally, the University released a statement cosigned by Victory Salute's subjects Tommie Smith, and John Carlos, as well as by activist Harry Edwards, and activist Ken Noel which expressed disapproval of the encampment around the statue. Victory Salute's artist, Rigo 23, released a statement supporting the encampment and gave a speech at the encampment.

On May 21, the protestors met with University President Cynthia Teniente-Matson and Interim Vice President for Student Affairs Mari Fuentes-Martin to discuss the protestors' demands. Teniente-Matson suggested the creation of a student advisory council composed of students from Middle Eastern student organizations that would work with faculty to address concerns about university partnerships with Israel. Following these talks, the encampment was dismantled on May 23.

=== Sonoma State ===
On April 26, tents went up at Sonoma State University in Rohnert Park for an encampment organized by SJP. On May 14, president Ming-Tung "Mike" Lee met with protesters and agreed to their demands to pursue divestment in Israel. He also made a statement: "SSU will not pursue or engage in any study abroad programs, faculty exchanges, or other formal collaborations that are sponsored by, or represent, the Israeli state academic and research institutions." But on May 15, he was placed on leave by the for insubordination and sending out the announcement "without appropriate approvals" according to CSU Chancellor Mildred García.

=== Stanislaus State ===
On May 15, a protest was held at California State University, Stanislaus.

== Claremont Colleges ==
On April 5, 2024, Pomona College, a member of the Claremont Colleges in Claremont, had 19 demonstrators occupying the president's office after an encampment was dismantled arrested, prompting protests and condemnations. On April 27, three demonstrations were held at three of the Claremont Colleges during alumni events at the schools. At 10:00 am, around 36 protesters disrupted a speech by Harvey Mudd College president Harriet Nembhard. At 3:15 pm, around 50 protesters formed a blockade during a parade at Pomona. About half an hour later, an encampment was set up at Pitzer College during a music and food festival. The encampment at Pitzer dispersed on May 5 after the college agreed to share information about the institution's investments. The day after, another encampment formed at Pomona.

Pomona College's administrators decided to move their commencement ceremony forty miles away due to the risk of disruptions caused by the protesters. When protesters showed up to the Shrine Auditorium in Los Angeles before the ceremony took place, police and security personnel repelled them violently.

== Private schools ==
=== CalArts ===
On May 8 at the California Institute of the Arts, the president agreed to discussions of divestment after a petition garnered over 1,000 signatures.

=== Caltech ===
On April 29, a sit-in protest was held outside the Student Services building at the California Institute of Technology.

=== Chapman ===
On May 2, an encampment was set up at Chapman University.

=== Loyola Marymount ===
On April 15, protests started at Loyola Marymount University after its Associated Students board vetoed a bylaw that would have boycotted companies believed to support Israel. Protests continued through the university's commencement on May 4.

=== Occidental ===
On April 29, encampments were set up at Occidental College in Eagle Rock. More than 100 students established their encampment in front of the Arthur G. Coons Administration Center, claiming they would remain there until the administration meets its demands for ceasefire and divestment from Israel. On May 7, the board of trustees agreed to vote on the protesters' demands.

=== Otis College of Art and Design ===
Protests were held at the Otis College of Art and Design in Los Angeles on April 26.

=== Saint Mary's College ===
On May 16, a pro-Palestinian occupation protest and a hunger strike organized by SJP took over a chapel at Saint Mary's College of California. One day later, a college spokesperson announced that they had reached an agreement with the protesters and the occupation would voluntarily end.

=== Santa Clara University ===
On May 1, a "teach-in" was held at Santa Clara University.

=== Stanford ===
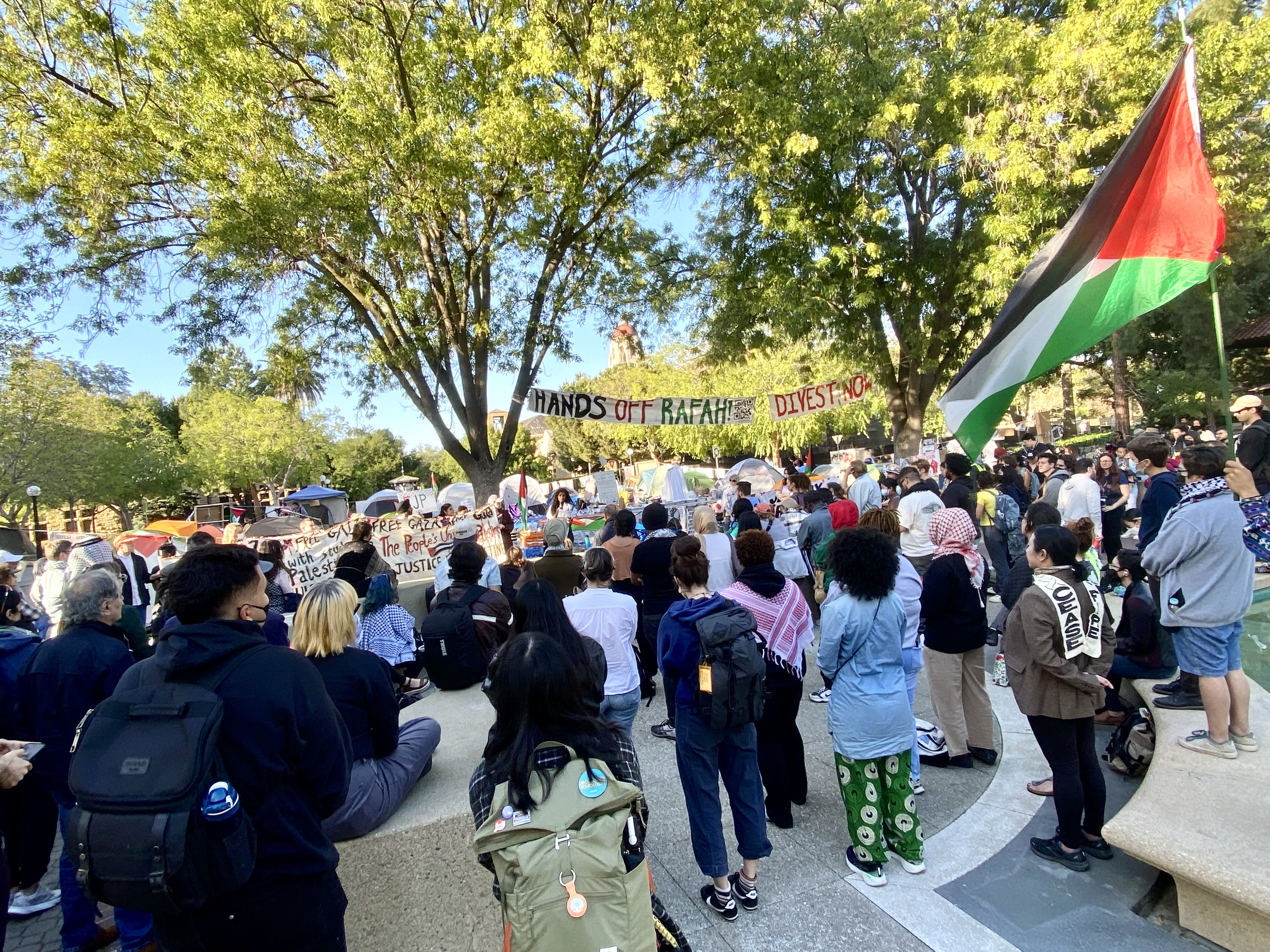
Pro Palestine protest and encampment at Stanford University

On April 25, an encampment was set up at Stanford University. About 450 protesters participated in a march, a sit-in and an encampment organized by "Stanford Against Apartheid in Palestine (SAAP)" at White Plaza. A coalition of students created after the university had previously dismantled a 120-day-old sit-in protest in February.

On May 12, a crowd of about 2000 pro-Israel protesters waved flag and heard speakers from many faiths at what was called an "interfaith" rally against antisemitism and terrorism near the encampment. The rally was organized by a Jewish student organization called the L'Chaim Club. SAAP organizers held a counter-protest rally where they claimed the other rally was meant to intimidate the encampment. Stanford University Police and Santa Clara County Sheriff's deputies separated the groups.

=== University of San Diego ===
On May 1, a walk-out was held at the University of San Diego.

=== University of San Francisco ===
On April 29, about 600 protesters attended a rally and marched around campus. Afterwards, students at University of San Francisco established a solidarity encampment they named the "Popular University for Gaza" calling for divestment from genocide. On May 14, about 50 tents were still occupying Welch Field when the university officials issued an ultimatum to leave or face discipline. The University have agreed to several of the students' demands, but students did not dismantle the encampment when the deadline came.

=== University of Southern California ===
The University of Southern California (USC) canceled a pro-Palestinian student's valedictorian speech citing a need to "maintain campus safety and security" after pro-Israel groups accused her of antisemitism. Some student organizations, including the editorial team of USC's student newspaper, criticized the choice to cancel the speech. The decision was followed by protests, with students attempting to establish an encampment. About 93 people were arrested during the night of April 24 including one arrest for assault with a deadly weapon, with no reports of injuries. USC later canceled many of its speakers for commencement before canceling the commencement altogether, citing safety concerns.

== Community colleges ==
=== Cerritos College ===
A protest was held outside the Cerritos College library on April 30.

=== Diablo Valley College ===
A protest was held at Diablo Valley College on May 7.

=== East Los Angeles College ===
Multiple protests were held at East Los Angeles College.

=== El Camino College ===
A protest march was held at El Camino College on May 21.

=== Long Beach City College ===
Multiple protests and one-day altars were held at Long Beach City College.

=== Pasadena City College ===
On April 30, a walk-out and protest was held at Pasadena City College.

=== San Diego City College ===
On May 7, students and faculty at San Diego City College held a walkout protest in solidarity with the people of Palestine. They marched on a circuitous route that ended in the delivery of a petition asking the administration to stop serving Starbucks products on campus.

=== Santa Barbara City College ===
A protest was held at Santa Barbara City College on May 17.

=== Santa Monica College ===
A protest was held at Santa Monica College on May 14.

=== Santa Rosa Junior College ===
On May 2, protests were held at Santa Rosa Junior College.

== See also ==
- List of pro-Palestinian protests on university campuses in the United States in 2024
- Lists of pro-Palestinian protests
- George Floyd protests in California
- 1992 Los Angeles riots
