= 2024 University of Virginia pro-Palestinian campus occupation =

Pro-Palestinian student protests in Virginia, US

- Part of Gaza war protests (in the US • at universities (in 2024 (in the US)))
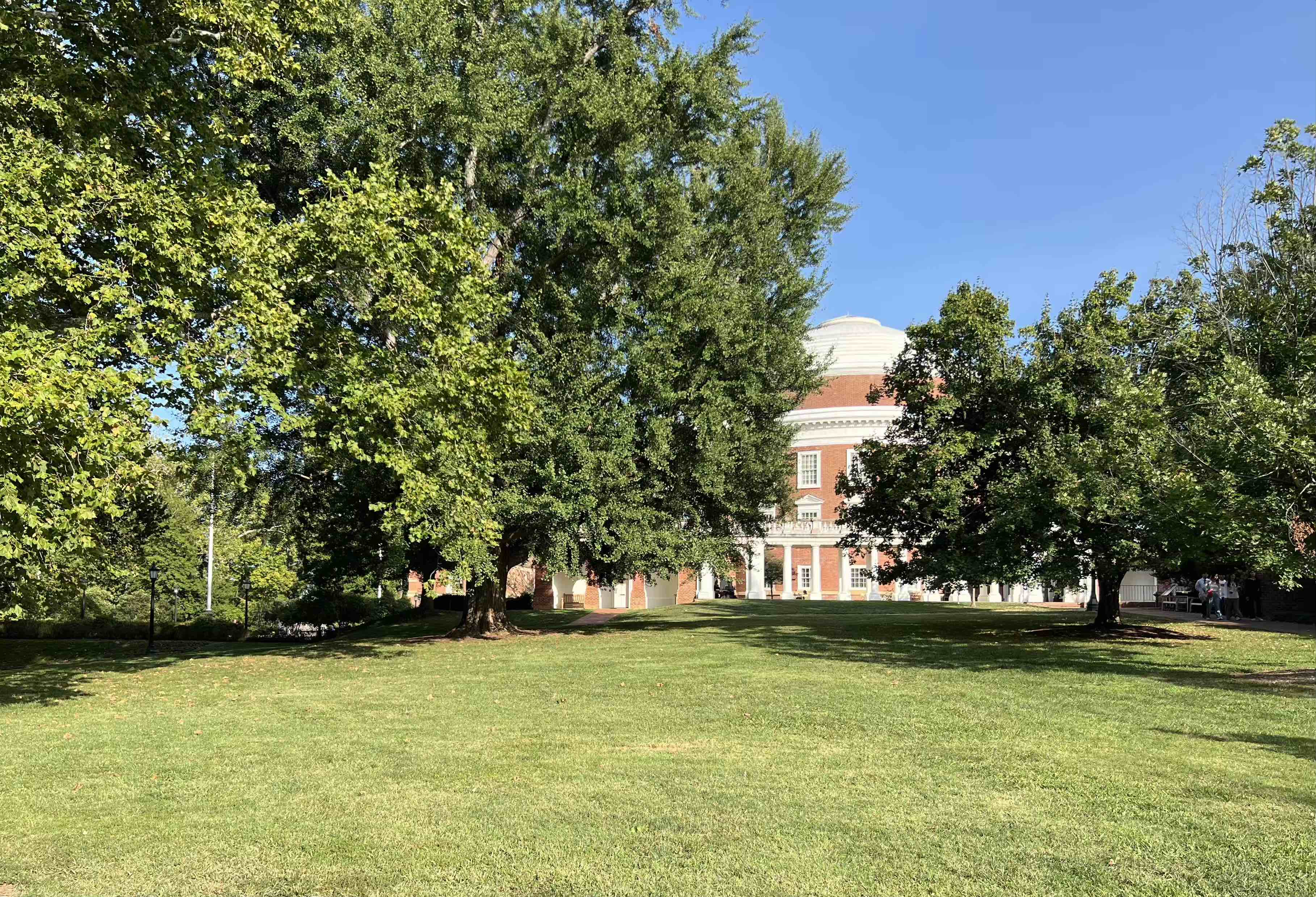
- The site of the pro-Palestinian student encampment in September 2024
- Date: May 1–4, 2024 (3 days)
- Location: University of Virginia, Charlottesville, Virginia, United States; 38°02′12″N 78°30′16″W
- Caused by: solidarity with other 2024 pro-Palestinian protests on university campuses
- Goals: disinvestment from Israel
- Methods: Protests; Occupation; Civil disobedience
- Result: Protests suppressed

Parties
Pro-Palestinian groups: UVA Dissenters; UVA Apartheid Divest Coalition; UVA Encampment for Gaza	State of Virginia; Virginia State Police; University of Virginia; University of Virginia Police Division

Casualties
- Injuries: pepper spray to protesters
- Arrested: 25 protesters arrested

In May 2024, peaceful pro-Palestinian student protesters at the University of Virginia (U.Va.) demonstrated on the campus. The protesters organized an anti-war occupation on university grounds in support of Palestinian nationalism in the context of the mass death and displacement of tens of thousands of Palestinian civilians during the Gaza war.

They called for the university to divest from Israel, disclose all investments, cease academic relations with Israeli universities and allow students and staff to voice their support for Palestinians without reprisal.

Students organized various protest activities at the University of Virginia from the start of the Israel-Hamas war and before. On May 1 students established a protest encampment at the university. For days, U.Va.'s students peacefully gathered at the encampment without incident. But on May 4, U.Va.’s administration instituted a last-minute change to their policy to disallow tents on campus. Only a few hours later, police in riot gear arrived to break up the encampment, pepper spraying demonstrators and arresting 27 of them.

== Background ==
The University of Virginia is a school in Charlottesville, Virginia.

The encampment was part of a widespread effort taking place at colleges and universities across the country, where students have set up "liberated zones" in an effort to draw attention to what they describe as a disproportionate response by the Israeli military to the October 7th attack carried out by Hamas.

Since October 7, Israeli forces have killed tens of thousands of Palestinian civilians, including more than ten thousand children. Hundreds of thousands of Palestinians have been displaced. Many face imminent starvation and disease due to the Israeli bombing campaign, which has destroyed most of Gaza's critical infrastructure, including homes, hospitals, universities, schools, places of worship and more. Humanitarian aid for Gaza's nearly two million residents has been severely limited or cut off altogether by Israel.

At the time of the pro-Palestinian protests, there was still a strong community memory of the 2017 white supremacy rally, Unite the Right. More generally, former president Donald Trump had been comparing pro-Palestinian protesters at universities nationwide to the hostile aggressors at the Unite the Right rally. A commentator for The New Republic described the comparison of pro-Palestinian protesters with Charlottesville Neo-Nazis as despicable and slander.

Following the indiscriminate and widespread bombardment of Palestinians after the October 7 2023 Hamas-led attack on Israel, which occurred in response to decades of illegal Israeli occupation of Palestinian territories, protests in support of Palestine included a student group publishing an October 11 statement of support for a Free Palestine. On April 19 students organized a die-in on The Lawn.

Previous pro-Palestinian demonstrations in the community included a 2021 Palestinian solidarity march.

== Demonstration ==
On Tuesday, April 30, student groups decided to convene a peaceful demonstration for Palestine starting the following day, Wednesday, May 1. The decision to act was in part due to student reports of violent ends to similar demonstrations at the nearby Virginia Commonwealth University and Virginia Tech. At the establishment of the protest, opponents compared the pro-Palestinian demonstrators to the white supremacists who organized the Unite the Right rally.

The encampment was near the University Chapel.

By the third day the occupation was robust and seemed prepared to continue indefinitely. In response to student demonstrations, University of Virginia professors organized a scholarly dialogue about the war.

On the fourth day the protesters announced their publication of a statement on an official Instagram account. Their demands included that the university begin disinvestment from Israel.

On Saturday, May 4, police force ended the demonstration only hours after U.Va.’s administration instituted a last-minute change to their policy to disallow tents on campus. The New York Times described the University of Virginia arrests as among the most prominent in the nation. Police used pepper spray on the demonstrators and then arrested 25 of them for trespassing.

== Reactions ==
The University of Virginia newspaper The Cavelier Daily, the local newspaper Charlottesville Tomorrow, and the university official communications described protesters as "Pro-Palestinian"; local newspaper The Daily Progress described them as "anti-war"; and national news source Fox News described them as "anti-Israel".

The University of Virginia and university president James E. Ryan issued official statements on May 4 that the demonstration was over because the protestors refused to comply with university policy and because of violent conduct. Ryan additionally made his own personal and official statement.
