= Alon Liel =

Israeli diplomat (born 1948)

- אלון ליאֵל
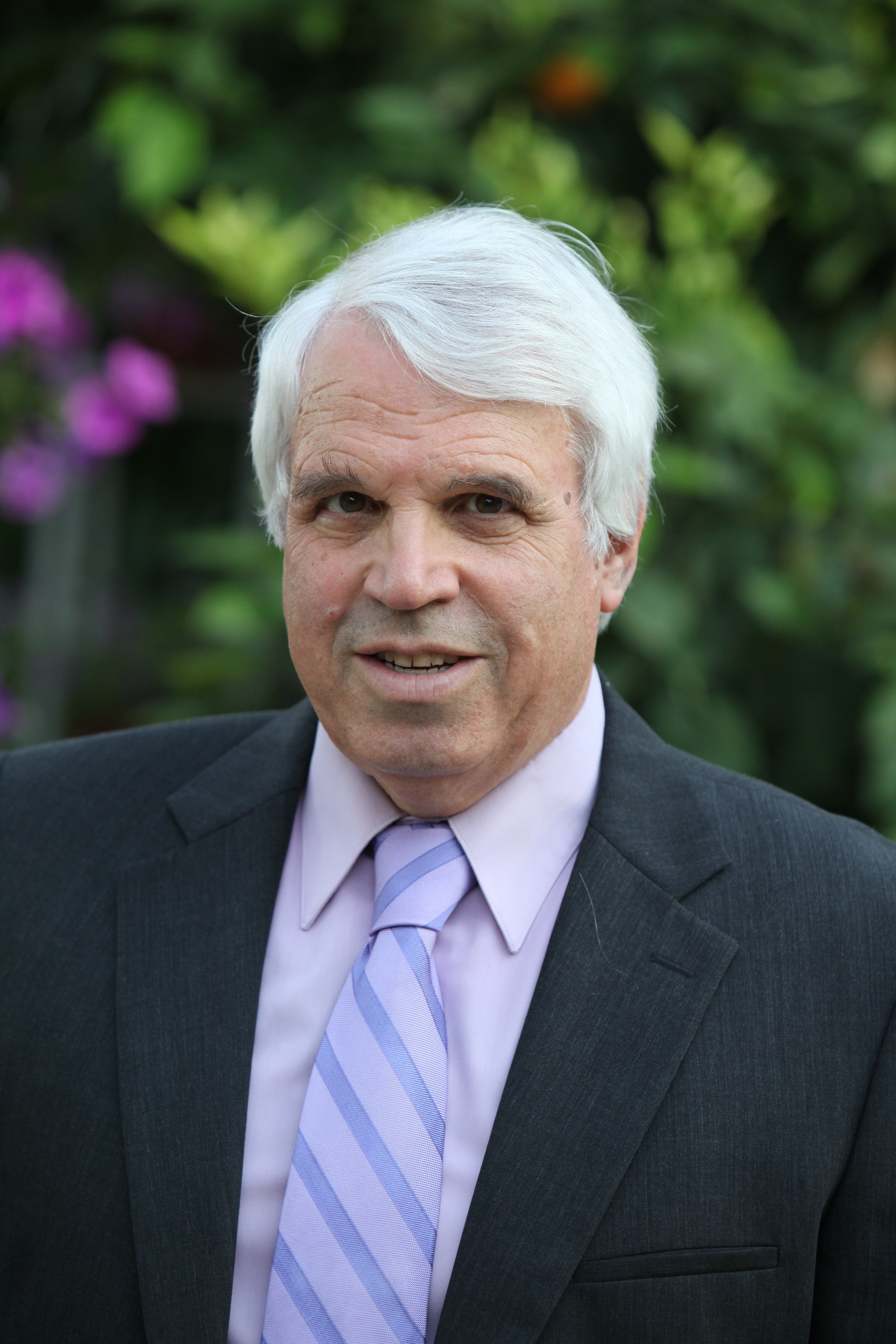
- Alon Liel Liel in 2010

Ambassador of Israel to South Africa
- In office 1992–1994

Chargé d'Affaires at the Israeli Embassy in Turkey
- In office 1981–1983

Personal details
- Born: 31 October 1948 (age 77) Tel Aviv, Israel
- Spouse: Rachel Liel
- Children: Daphna Liel

Alon Liel (Hebrew: אלון ליאֵל; born 31 October 1948) is an Israeli international relations scholar and former diplomat.

He served as the Director General of the Israeli Ministry of Economy and Planning from 1994 to 1996, and as the Director General of the Israeli Ministry of Foreign Affairs for about six months, he also served as the Chargé d'Affaires at the Israeli Embassy in Ankara, Turkey, and as Ambassador to South Africa.

== Career ==
In 1979, Liel was appointed to his first position outside of Israel, as Deputy Consul in Chicago. He later served as the Chargé d'Affaires in Turkey (1981), deputy director of the Middle East Department at the Ministry of Foreign Affairs (1984), advisor to the political director of the Ministry of Foreign Affairs and head of the South Africa desk (1986), spokesperson for the Ministry of Foreign Affairs (1988), consul in Atlanta (1990), and Ambassador of Israel to South Africa (1992).

After his tenure in South Africa ended in 1994, Minister of Economy and Planning Shimon Shtrit appointed him as the Director General of his ministry, a position he held until the ministry was dissolved by Yossi Beilin in 1996. In 1997, he founded the company "Global Code," specializing in consulting and research for companies operating in Turkey. Concurrently, he served as an advisor to Ehud Barak on foreign affairs while Barak was serving as Leader of the Opposition, and also lectured in international relations programs at the Hebrew University of Jerusalem, Tel Aviv University, and the Interdisciplinary Center Herzliya. His lectures primarily focused on issues related to Turkey and South Africa, as well as the fundamentals of diplomacy.

During the 1999 Knesset elections and Prime Minister elections, he served as an advisor to Ehud Barak. In this capacity, he was also linked to the Barak's NGO scandal After David Levy resigned as Foreign Minister in 2000, Prime Minister of Israel Barak appointed him as Director General of the Ministry of Foreign Affairs. The appointment took effect in early November 2000, shortly before Shlomo Ben-Ami was appointed Foreign Minister. Following the establishment of the 29th government, Shimon Peres became Foreign Minister and decided to appoint Avi Gil in Liel's place. The appointment was made in April 2001. Liel then served as a director at the investment and real estate company "Gazit Inc", and as chair of the Israel-Turkey Business Council.

From 2006 to 2008, he privately managed (with the knowledge of the Israeli government) a channel for secret talks with Syrian officials through the Swiss government. In 2009, Liel headed the movement for peace between Israel and Syria.

In an article for the South African newspaper "Business Day" in 2012, Liel called for a boycott of settlement products. This article sparked significant criticism within the political and public arenas in Israel. Liel also supported author Alice Walker's decision to boycott Israel and not republish her book "The Color Purple" in Israel. In 2015, he participated in an appeal to the government of Brazil requesting that it not approve Israel's intention to appoint Danny Danon as Israel's Ambassador to Brazil. In December 2015, he signed a petition for members of the European Parliament calling for them, following the parliament's decision on product labeling from the West Bank and the Golan Heights, to escalate measures distinguishing between Israel within the Green Line and "the occupied territories".

In January 2016, recordings were published in "Yedioth Ahronoth" made by the organization "Enough - Youth for Israel" documenting a conversation between Liel and members of the organization Breaking the Silence, where Liel is heard saying to the organization's members that although they have the legitimacy of two percent of the Israeli public, one cannot wait due to the expansion of the settlements and must act outside of Israel. He recommended that activists apply pressure for an international boycott that could only influence Israel, as happened in South Africa: "You are the tip of the spear that tells the world that the occupation is intolerable for us and intolerable for them. It is intolerable for both peoples, and once there is recognition that it is intolerable, things will start to unfold". Liel also recommended pursuing a decision from the United Nations Security Council that Palestine is a member state, which would make Israel an occupier of a UN member state. He also suggested initiating a sporting boycott of Israel. In response to the publications, Liel stated that he opposes a boycott of Israel.

In December 2019, Liel began promoting a "Joint Democratic and Electoral Struggle Front" of Meretz with the Joint List (Ra'am) for the Knesset.

From 2008 to 2013, he served as a member of the Mevaseret Zion council on behalf of the "Mevaseret on a Different Level" party. He also served as the chairman of the football club, Hapoel Abu Ghosh/Mevaseret Zion.

Regarding Israel's treatment of Jonathan Pollard, Liel stated: "Even when I was the Director General of the Ministry of Foreign Affairs, I don't remember a single time that the Pollard issue came up. There was not a single discussion at the level of the director general where we talked about it".

=== Current Activities ===
Liel is a member of the board of the organization "Sikuy - Promoting Civil Equality", the organization Ir Amim and in the public council of B'Tselem, and he is a member of the "All Citizens" party.

Liel also believes that since it would grant Palestinians equality with Israelis, the United Nations' recognition of the state of Palestine and its membership are essential to getting Israel to the negotiating table.

== Family ==
Alon Liel is married to Rachel Liel, who is part of the leadership of the New Israel Fund (board president as of 2023, formerly Israel director). They have three children, one of whom is the Knesset reporter Daphna Liel.

== Publications ==
- Turkey in the Middle East, Kibbutz Meuhad Publishing, 1993
- Black Justice - The South African Revolution, Kibbutz Meuhad, 1999
- Turkey: Military, Islam, and Politics, Kibbutz Meuhad, 1999
- Demo-Islam - A New Regime in Turkey, Kibbutz Meuhad, 2003
- The Equality Gate: South Africa Builds a Nation, Kibbutz Meuhad, 2011
- Alon Liel and Yehuda Litani, And We Shall Break Them, Kibbutz Meuhad, 2024

== See also ==
- Israel–Turkey relations
- 2004 Israel–New Zealand passport scandal
- United Nations General Assembly resolution 67/19 accepting Palestine as a non-member observer state in the United Nations General Assembly
- Independent Israel–Syria Peace Initiatives
