= Israel–Syria relations =

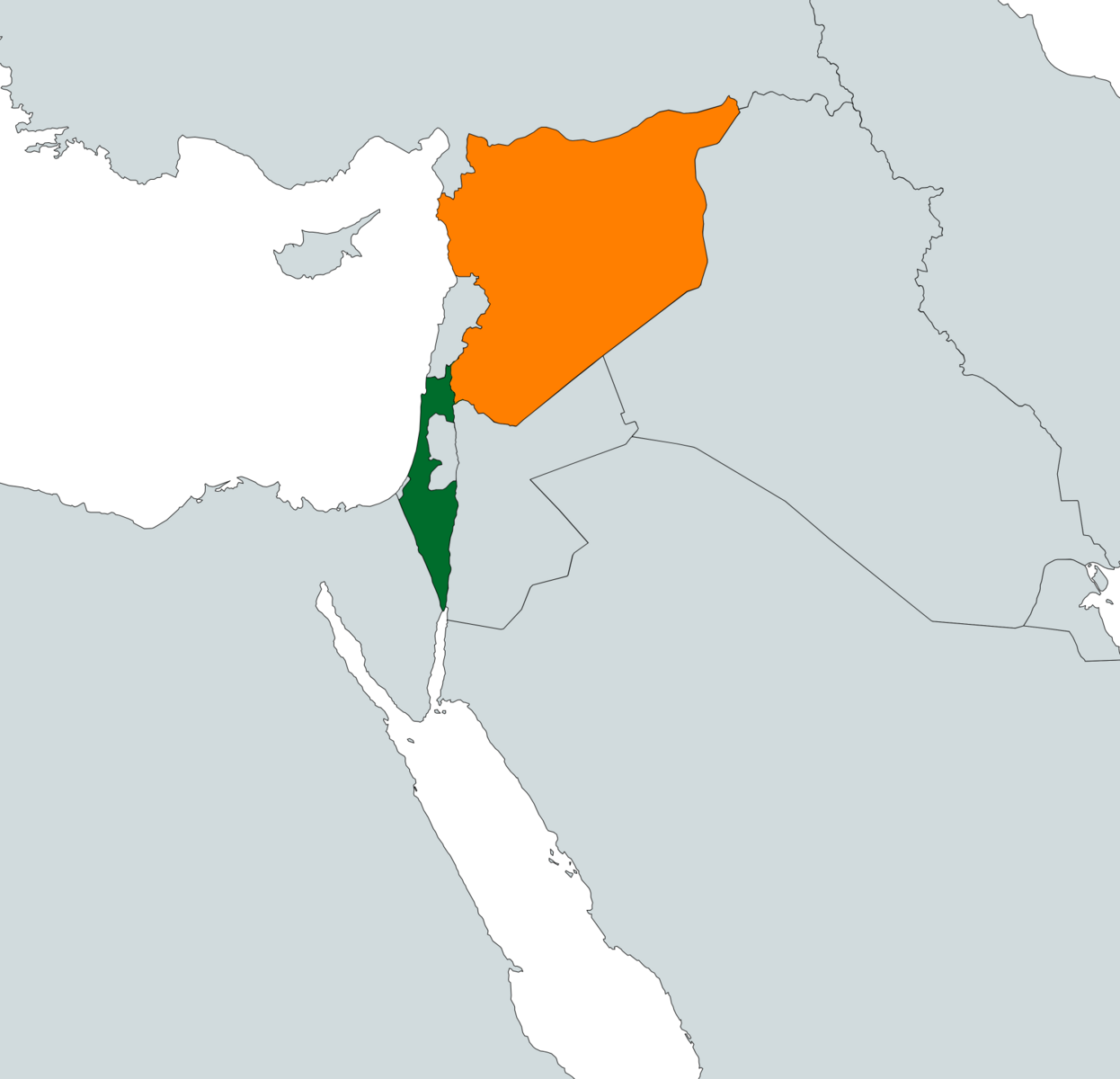
- Israel: Syria

Relations between Israel and Syria are historically hostile. The two countries have been locked in a perpetual war since the establishment of Israel in 1948, with their most significant and direct armed engagements being in the First Arab–Israeli War in 1948–1949, the Third Arab–Israeli War in 1967, and the Fourth Arab–Israeli War in 1973. Additionally, Israeli and Syrian forces also saw relatively extensive combat against each other during the Lebanese Civil War, the 1982 Lebanon War, as well as the War of Attrition. Both states have at times signed and held armistice agreements, although all efforts to achieve complete peace have been without success. Syria has never recognized Israel as a legitimate state and does not accept Israeli passports as legally valid for entry into Syrian territory; Israel likewise regards Syria as a hostile state and generally prohibits its citizens from travelling there, with some exceptions and special accommodations being made by both countries for Druze people residing in Syria and the Golan Heights (regarded by the United Nations as Syrian territory, occupied by Israel since 1967). Israel and Syria have never established formal diplomatic relations since the inception of both countries in the mid-20th century.

In line with the lack of diplomatic relations and continuous state of war, there have been virtually no economic or cultural ties between Israel and Syria, and a limited movement of people across the border. Syria continues to be an active participant in the Arab League's boycott of Israel. Both countries do allow a limited trade of items such as locally-grown apples for the Golan Druze villages, which are located on both sides of the UNDOF ceasefire line, and Syria provides 10 percent of the water supply for the Druze town of Majdal Shams in the Israeli-occupied Golan Heights as a part of an agreement that has been ongoing since the 1980s. The state of peace at the Israel–Syria ceasefire line (which has served as the international border since the 1967 war) has been strained due to the Syrian Civil War, which began in 2011 and ended in 2024.

== History ==
=== 1948–1975 ===
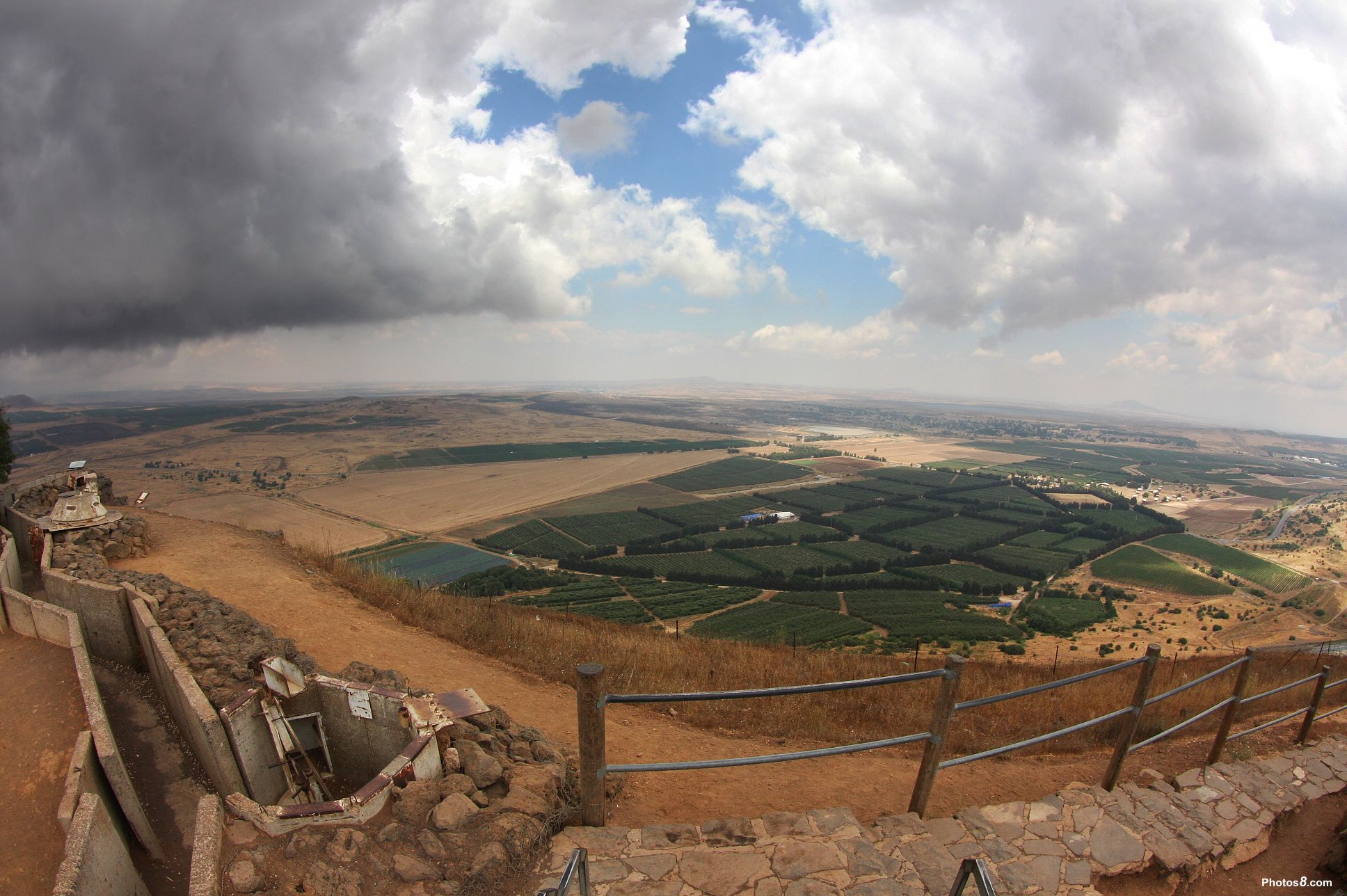
Ceasefire line

Syria has been an active belligerent, with periodic ceasefires and use of proxies, against Israel ever since May 1948, (Note: CIA original operative Miles Copeland, claims that these proxies were a cover for a cooperative Israeli-Syrian efforts to actually protect Israel: "The Syrian Government, the most two-faced of them all, has gone so far as to provoke Palestinian units into making raids into Israel, and then to tip off the Israelis". Copeland, Miles. Without Cloak or Dagger. 1974. LCCN 74-1136. pp. 220–221.) when the Syrian army captured territory from the newly established State of Israel north and south of the Sea of Galilee. Most of this territory was returned to Israel after the signing of the July 1949 Armistice Agreement and declared Demilitarized Zones. However, the exact location of the border between the two states, ownership of portions of territory and the right of Israeli farmers to farm the land in the Demilitarized Zones on the Israeli side of the border remained in dispute and sparked intermittent fighting between Syria and Israel until the 1967 Arab–Israeli War.

Since the 1949 Armistice Agreements, relations between Israel and Syria have been characterized by periods of hostility; ceasefire talks, sometimes through intermediaries; and disengagement agreements, such as the 1974 Israeli–Syrian disengagement agreement.

Through the early 1950s the Syrians gradually retook de facto control of some of the territory ostensibly belonging to Israel (along the foot of part of the western escarpment of the Golan Heights north of the Sea of Galilee, along the north-eastern coast of the Sea of Galilee and the low ground below the southern escarpment of the Golan). In addition to the territorial dispute, small-scale fighting was also sparked by a dispute over Israel's right to pump water from the Jordan River and the Sea of Galilee (actually a fresh-water lake) for use in agricultural irrigation and drinking.

From 1964 to 1966 the Syrians attempted to dig a canal that would divert the sources of the Jordan River before they entered Israeli territory—thus drying up that portion of the River and dramatically reducing the water-intake of the Sea of Galilee to prevent Israel from using that water. This led to a period of escalated fighting as the Israelis sought to prevent this diversion project which threatened to severely damage their ability to provide fresh-water to their population and agriculture (attempts to negotiate a solution by UN mediators failed). In fact, escalation of incidents between Israel and Syria in late 1966 and spring 1967 was one of the prime causes leading to the crisis that precipitated the Six Day War.

The Battle of Golan Heights during the Six-Day War, 9–10 June 1967

Prior to the 1967 Six-Day War, intermittent hostilities centered on the demilitarized zones, water issues and shelling and infiltration from the Golan Heights. Since the war, the focus of negotiations has been "land for peace," in particular a demand that Israel return the Golan Heights to Syria along with Syrian recognition of Israel and establishment of peaceful relations with it, as stipulated in UN Security Council Resolution 242, which became the basis for the peace process negotiations begun in Madrid, calls for a just and lasting Middle East peace to include withdrawal of Israeli armed forces from territories (note: not all territories) occupied in 1967; termination of the state of belligerency; and acknowledgment of the sovereignty, territorial integrity, and political independence of all regional states and of their right to live in peace within secure and recognized boundaries.

As a result of the mediation efforts of then US Secretary of State Henry Kissinger, Syria and Israel concluded a disengagement agreement in May 1974, enabling Syria to recover territory lost in the October war and part of the Golan Heights occupied by Israel since 1967, including Quneitra. The two sides have effectively implemented the agreement, which is monitored by UN forces.

And yet, in the US-brokered Syrian–Israeli talks during the 1990s, Syria demanded that Israeli future withdrawal would be to the "June 4, 1967 Lines", namely west of the former British Mandate border with Syria. Syria attempted to recover the Golan Heights in the Yom Kippur War, but was unsuccessful, only recovering a small part of it in the 1974 disengagement agreement, while committing to distance its armed forces further eastwards compared with their 1967–1973 positions.

=== During Lebanese civil war ===
In December 1981, the Israeli Knesset voted to extend Israeli law to the part of the Golan Heights over which Israel retained control. The UN Security Council subsequently passed a resolution calling on Israel to rescind this measure. In 1982, Israel invaded Lebanon to drive out the PLO. Syria sent ground and air forces to assist the Lebanese, but these were largely routed by the Israelis. Syria continued to support Lebanese militias, leading up to Israel's withdrawal in 2000.

=== 1990s peace efforts ===
The first high-level public negotiations aimed at a permanent resolution of the conflict between Israel and Syria began at the Madrid Conference of 1991. Throughout the 1990s, successive Israeli governments held negotiations with Syrian President Hafez al-Assad, principally concerning an Israeli withdrawal from the Golan Heights in exchange for peace and security arrangements. Although substantial progress was reported at various stages, the negotiations did not produce an agreement.

A central issue was Syria's demand for an Israeli withdrawal to the lines of June 4, 1967, immediately before the Six-Day War. These lines differed from the international boundary established during the British and French mandates and would have given Syria access to the northeastern shore of the Sea of Galilee. Israel sought security guarantees, including demilitarized zones and restrictions on Syrian military deployments. Syria, in turn, demanded reciprocal limitations on Israeli forces, which Israel considered unacceptable.

During the premiership of Benjamin Netanyahu from 1996 to 1999, American businessman and diplomat Ronald Lauder served as an unofficial intermediary in secret negotiations between Israel and Syria. At Netanyahu's request, Lauder conducted discussions with Assad and Lebanese Prime Minister Rafic Hariri concerning a possible peace agreement. The negotiations continued into the premiership of Ehud Barak, who succeeded Netanyahu in 1999.

In an October 2026 interview with Haaretz, Lauder said that he had spent approximately 10 to 15 months traveling between Israel, Syria and Lebanon in an effort to negotiate an agreement. According to Lauder, the negotiations produced a ten-point proposal providing for an Israeli withdrawal from the Golan Heights in exchange for peace with Syria. Lauder claimed that both Netanyahu and Assad had accepted the proposed terms, but that Netanyahu subsequently declined to sign the agreement without the endorsement of Defense Minister Ariel Sharon. Netanyahu has denied having agreed to relinquish the Golan Heights.

Negotiations continued under Barak, including talks involving Israeli and Syrian representatives at Shepherdstown, West Virginia, in January 2000. The discussions addressed territorial withdrawal, security arrangements, the normalization of relations and access to water resources. Despite progress on several issues, the parties remained divided over the precise boundary and Syria's demand for access to the Sea of Galilee.

A summit between United States President Bill Clinton and Assad in Geneva in March 2000 failed to resolve the remaining disagreements. The failure has been attributed to several factors, including differences over the proposed withdrawal lines, Barak's reluctance to commit to a complete withdrawal, and disagreements concerning the terms presented to Assad. The negotiations subsequently stalled, and no peace agreement was reached before Assad's death in June 2000.

Syria continued to call for a comprehensive settlement based on UN Security Council Resolutions 242 and 338, and the land-for-peace principle adopted at the 1991 Madrid Conference.

=== During Damascus spring: 2000–2005 ===
Tensions between Israel and Syria increased as the Intifada dragged on, primarily as a result of Syria's refusal to stop giving sanctuary to Palestinian militant groups conducting operations against Israel. In October 2003, following a suicide bombing carried out by a member of Palestinian Islamic Jihad in Haifa that killed 20 Israeli citizens, Israel Defense Forces attacked a suspected Palestinian militant training camp 15 kilometers north of Damascus. This was the first such Israeli attack deep inside Syrian territory since the 1973 war. Syria announced it would respond diplomatically, and asked the UN Security Council to condemn the Israeli action.

High points of hostility in the 2000s included the Ain es Saheb airstrike (an Israeli Air Force mission against Palestinian militants inside Syria) in 2003 and Operation Orchard (an Israeli air and commando mission against Syria's alleged nuclear program) in 2007.

=== Syrian alliance with Iran: 2006–2024 ===
During the 2006 Lebanon War, Syria threatened to enter the war on Hezbollah's side, provided support to Hezbollah, and allowed Iran to ship supplies to Hezbollah through its territory. Later, Turkey organized peace talks between the two countries, but Syria later withdrew in response to the 2008–2009 Gaza War.

The September 2007 Operation Outside the Box attack by the Israeli Air Force destroyed a facility that Israel claimed was a nuclear site in the Deir ez-Zor region.

In 2010, Syrian President Bashar al-Assad accused Israel of avoiding peace, and Syrian Foreign Minister Walid Muallem warned that in the event of a future war, Israeli cities would be targeted by Syrian missiles. Israeli Foreign Minister Avigdor Lieberman responded by saying that the Syrian military would be defeated in a war with Israel, and Assad and his family would be forced from power. Lieberman also advised Syria to let go of the demand for the Golan Heights. For several months in 2010 Prime Minister Benjamin Netanyahu of Israel engaged in secret, American-brokered discussions with Syria.

==== During Syrian civil war: 2011–2024 ====
Several incidents have taken place on the Israeli–Syrian ceasefire line during the Syrian Civil War, straining the state of peace between the countries. The incidents are considered a spillover of the Quneitra Governorate clashes since 2012 and later incidents between the Syrian Army and the rebels, ongoing on the Syrian-controlled side of the Golan and the Golan Neutral Zone and the Hezbollah involvement in the Syrian Civil War. Through the incidents, which began in late 2012, as of mid-2014, one Israeli civilian was killed and at least 4 soldiers wounded; on the Syrian-controlled side, it is estimated that at least ten soldiers were killed, as well as two unidentified militants, who attempted to penetrate into Israeli-occupied side of the Golan Heights.

On 11 May 2018, Israel urged Syria to reduce the level of Iranian military presence in the country, with Defense Minister Avigdor Lieberman stating: "Throw the Iranians, Qasem Soleimani and the Quds forces out of your country! They are not acting in your interest, they are only hurting you. Their whole presence only brings problems and destruction."

On 10 July 2018, Lieberman did not rule out establishing "some kind of relationship" with Syria under Assad.

On 11 July 2018, Netanyahu stated that Israel was not seeking to take action against Assad, but urged Russia to facilitate the withdrawal of Iranian troops from Syria.

On 2 August 2018, Lieberman stated his belief that Syrian troops regaining control of the country's border with Israel would reduce the chance of conflict in the Golan Heights by providing "a real address, someone responsible, and central rule".

In April 2019, Syria permitted the return of the remains of Zechariah Baumel to Israel in a Russian-brokered deal. In exchange, Israel released two Syrian prisoners as a "goodwill gesture" to Syria in January 2020.

In January 2021, Syria denied reports of a Russia-mediated meeting at the Khmeimim Air Base between former IDF Chief of Staff Gadi Eisenkot and Syrian National Security Bureau head Ali Mamlouk.

In February 2021, Israel took part in a Russian-brokered prisoner exchange with Syria, where Syria released an Israeli woman who had entered Syria in exchange for two Syrian shepherds who had entered Israel. According to the Times of Israel, there was more to this agreement than purely a prisoner exchange, but that these details had been redacted by an Israeli military censor on media coverage of the agreement. Subsequent foreign media reports revealed that Israel had supplied COVID-19 vaccines to Syria as part of the agreement.

On May 19, 2022, the Israeli military said it activated its missile defences after wrongly identifying a danger near the Lebanon border.

On May 20, 2022, an Israeli "aggression" launched from the Golan Heights and targeting southern sections of Damascus killed three individuals and inflicted minor material damage, according to the Syrian Ministry of Defense.

In October 2023, the Tahrir al-Sham's clerics held prayers for a Palestinian victory in the Gaza war and said it celebrated Hamas' jihad while condemning its ties with Shiite-led Iran. The group expressed support for the right of the Palestinian people to reclaim their land. The rebel anti-Assad Syrian National Army (SNA), previously the Free Syrian Army (FSA), expressed sympathy for the Palestinian people in the Gaza Strip, comparing Israel's attacks in Gaza to Assad regime's attacks on rebel-held areas in Syria's Idlib Governorate.

On 1 April 2024, Israel's air strike on an Iranian consulate building in the Syrian capital Damascus killed an important senior commander of the Islamic Revolutionary Guards Corps (IRGC), Brig Gen Mohammad Reza Zahedi.

During the decisive battle of Damascus and subsequent fall of the Assad regime on 7–8 December 2024, Israeli forces initiated military operations in Syria's Quneitra Governorate. Prime Minister Benjamin Netanyahu stated that the goal is to prevent any threat until an agreement was reached with the new Syrian government. He also said their desire is to establish neighborly and peaceful relations, and offered a hand of peace to all the Christians, Druzes, Kurds, and Muslims in Syria who want to live in peace with the State of Israel.

A Turkish news report claimed that Assad provided Israel with a map of Syria's military sites before fleeing to Russia.

=== Post-Assad Syria: 2025–present ===
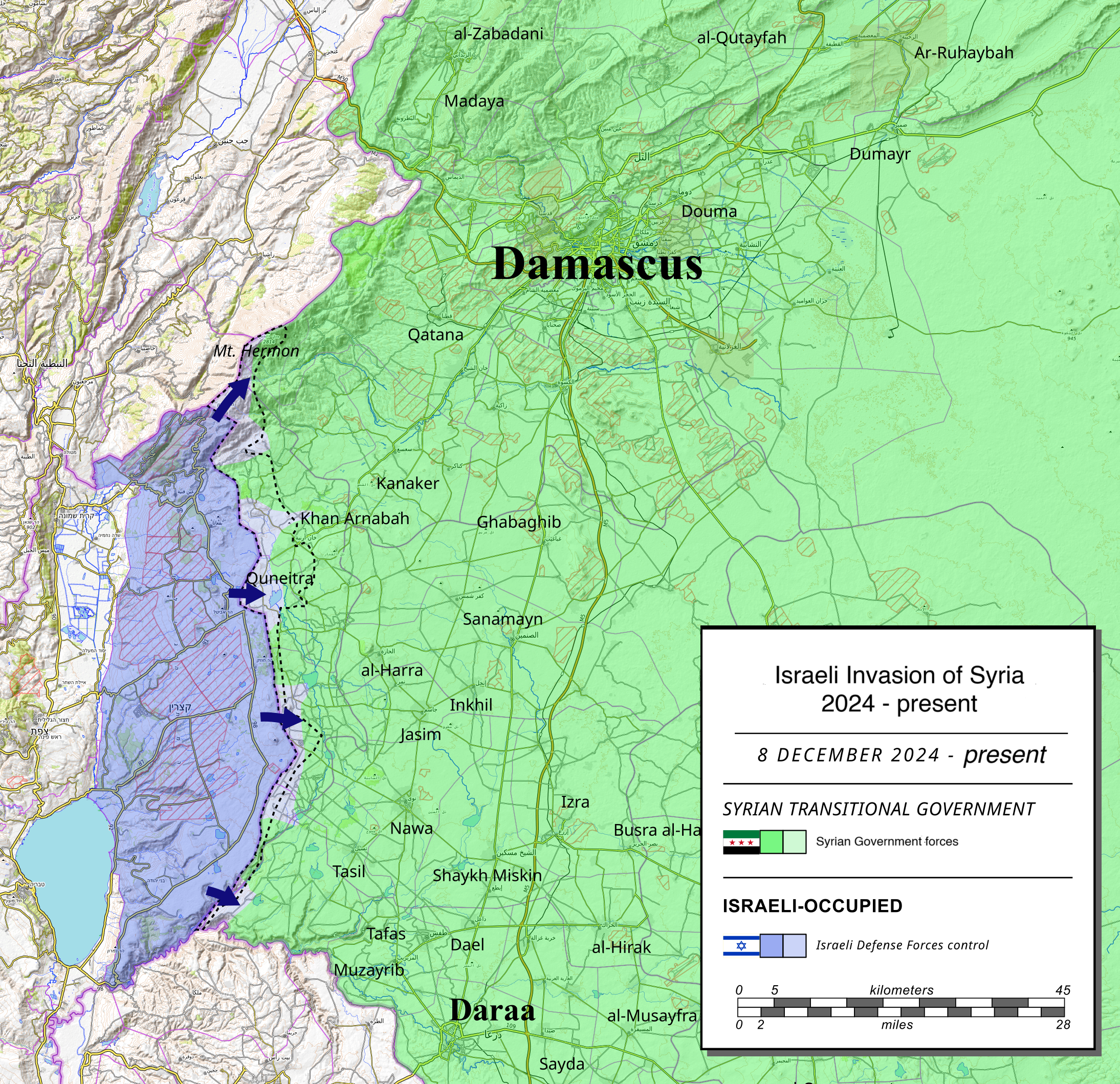
Israeli-annexed Golan Heights and Israeli invasion of Syria in 2024

"Israel occupied the Golan Heights in order to protect Israel, and now they are imposing conditions in the south of Syria in order to protect the Golan Heights. So after a few years, maybe they will occupy the center of Syria in order to protect the south of Syria. They will reach Munich on that pathway[...]"

— Ahmed al-Sharaa (November 11, 2025)

After announcing that due to the regime collapsing, Israel no longer recognizes the ceasefire that was reached with the former regime and does not view it as legally binding anymore, during its December 2024 invasion, Israel took control of the United Nations Disengagement Observer Force (UNDOF) buffer area.

Israeli Prime Minister Benjamin Netanyahu demanded the complete demilitarization of southern Syria in the governates of Quneitra, Daraa and Suwayda, and the withdrawal of Syrian forces from Syrian territory south of Damascus on 23 February 2025. Israeli Defense Minister Israel Katz said that Israeli forces would remain in southern Syria "for an indefinite period of time to protect our communities and thwart any threat." Syria condemned Israel's invasion and demanded they withdraw. Hours later, Israel conducted a wave of airstrikes in Damascus and southern Syria. Reuters reported in February 2025 that the United States is being lobbied by Israel to keep Syria weak and decentralized, including by allowing Russia to maintain military bases in Syria to counter Turkey.

Israel received a delegation of over 150 Syrian Druze from Hader, Syria in March 2025, a historic visit after fifty years of a closed border. The visit had top level Israeli diplomatic and security involvement and included a visit to the Nabi Shu'ayb tomb, a meeting with Israeli Druze leader, Muwaffaq Tarif, participation in the annual sheikhs march, and dedication of a khalwa. Israeli Druze MK Hamad Amar coordinated the visit, and hopes many more will continue for years to come. He expressed concern that the new leader of Syria, Ahmed al-Sharaa, is a former member of the Islamic State, and termed the 2025 massacres of Syrian Alawites a genocide. He was also worried about the threats to Druze in southern Syria, and hoped Israel would continue to defend them.

Reports in June 2025 stated that Israel and Syria were in direct daily contact and discussing the possibility of normalizing their bilateral relations. Israel stated on 3 July 2025 that its forces had captured a "terrorist cell operated by Iran" in southern Syria. Israeli airstrikes on 16 July 2025 targeted the Syrian military headquarters in Damascus and multiple sites across Suwayda and Daraa in response to massacres of Druze perpetrated by Bedouin militias and Syrian military forces. The strikes killed at least three and injured 34, also hitting the vicinity of the Presidential Palace and the al-Tha'lah Airbase.

On August 20, 2025, the official Syrian News Agency issued an official statement that Syrian Foreign Minister Asaad al-Shaibani met in Paris with an Israeli delegation "to discuss a number of issues related to strengthening stability in the region and in southern Syria." This was the first time in over 25 years that an official Syrian media outlet had reported on contacts between the Syrian government and the Israeli government. A few days later, Syrian President Ahmed al-Sharaa claimed that a security agreement with Israel was at an advanced stage, and emphasized that he would not hesitate to publicly reach a peace agreement with Israel if it benefited Syria and the region. During his visit to Washington, D.C. in November 2025, al-Sharaa stated that they are in direct negotiations with Israel, and reiterated that Israel should withdraw to their pre-December 8 borders before a final agreement can be reached.

In November 2025, the Israeli army killed 13 individuals in the Syrian town of Beit Jinn, while the unlawful detention of Syrians has risen due to the Israeli army's expansion of checkpoints in Syria. In a December 2025 interview with CNN, Syrian President Ahmed al-Sharaa stated that Israeli leaders "frequently export crises to other nations."

== Peace, security, and non-aggression agreements ==
Over the decades, conversations and negotiations have been conducted between Israeli and Syrian representatives on potential peace deals. Under the 1974 Agreement on Disengagement, the two parties agreed to the continuation of the ceasefire, the demilitarized zones, and the presence of a UN Peacekeeping Force. It lasted 45 years until the fall of the Assad regime, at which point Israel unilaterally decided that the Syrian signatory had ceased to exist and that the deal was no longer in operation. The agreement was explicitly not a peace treaty, but rather a "step towards [...] peace". Israeli military documents released in 2024 described the negotiation as much more difficult than the contemporaneous negotiations with Egypt.

There were rumours of secret negotiations between Israel and Syria regarding the status of the Golan Heights. One was that the Golan was secretly sold to Israel by President Hafez al-Assad for $100 million or for promises of non-involvement by Israel in Syrian internal affairs. Opponents of the Syrian government during the civil war accused Bashar Assad of tacitly giving up the heights by not defending it internationally.

=== 2025–2026 Negotiations ===
Following the establishment of al-Sharaa's government, talks began again on a border deal. Syria said that its goal is an agreement similar to the 1974 agreement, and that control over the Golan Heights and Mount Hermon are not being discussed. Separately the Syrian president said that there could be a peace agreement with Israel if it benefited Syria, but that normalization was off the table. Syria's Information minister Hamza al-Mustafa said that joining the Abraham Accords was off the table until Israel withdraws from the Golan Heights.

Reported contents of new peace agreement
Syrian demands	Israeli demands
Withdrawal IDF forces to 1974 agreement lines (except for 2 bases); Recognition of al-Sharaa government; Non-interference in Syrian internal affairs; Recognition and respect of Syrian sovereignty and territorial integrity	Syrian territory will not be used to attack Israel; Reduced Iranian and proxy presence in Syria; Security for Syrian minorities; Partial demilitarization of southern Syria; Air corridor through Syrian territory to Iran

In late October 2025, Israeli sources told Al Arabiya that an agreement was close, based on the 1974 agreement. The agreement reportedly includes a trilateral committee of Israeli, Syrian, and American representatives, guarantees for minority protection in southern Syria, and an Israeli commitment to Syrian territorial integrity.

On January 5, 2026, high-level security negotiations between Israel and Syria resumed in Paris under the coordination of U.S. envoy Tom Barrack and French mediation. The Syrian delegation, led by Foreign Minister Asaad al-Shaibani and intelligence chief Hussein al-Salama, is seeking the withdrawal of Israeli forces to positions held prior to the December 2024 fall of the Assad regime. These discussions, reportedly prompted by a request from U.S. President Donald Trump to Prime Minister Benjamin Netanyahu, aim to reactivate the 1974 Disengagement Agreement to stabilize the border. While Israel, represented by Ambassador Yechiel Leiter and military secretary Maj. Gen. Roman Gofman, maintains that any agreement must protect its "red lines" and prevent Iranian entrenchment, Syria has emphasized its commitment to restoring full national sovereignty. This exploratory summit represents the first significant diplomatic engagement between the two nations following a two-month hiatus in talks.

On January 6, 2026, officials confirmed that the negotiations were ongoing in Paris, with further discussions expected under U.S. mediation, even against the backdrop of reports of Israeli military activity in southern Syria. Israeli media reported that Israeli officials regard the resumption of talks as a constructive development and have cited Syrian expressions of seriousness toward the negotiation process as a positive indication. Later that day, Israel and Syria agreed to establish a U.S.-supervised communication mechanism, intended to enable regular coordination and reduce the risk of military escalation, marking a procedural step toward more structured engagement between the two sides.

On August 14, 2026, Mossad chief Roman Gofman held a phone call with Syrian Foreign Minister Asaad al-Shaibani, during which they discussed Turkey's increasing military presence in Syria, including the provision of arms and drones to the Syrian military. Following Israel's strike on the Abu al-Duhur Air Base on August 18, which Israel linked to concerns over a potential Turkish military deployment in Syria, tensions between Israel and Syria increased. On August 23, Gofman and al-Shaibani reportedly met in Jordan in an effort to de-escalate tensions following the strike.

== Israeli humanitarian aid to Syrians ==
=== Operation Good Neighbor (2016–2018) ===
In June 2016, the Israeli military began Operation Good Neighbor, a multi-faceted humanitarian relief operation to prevent starvation of Syrians who live along the border and provide basic or advanced medical treatment.

The aid consisted of medical care, water, electricity, education or food and was given to Syrians near the ceasefire line between Israel and Syria, often escorted across by Israeli soldiers. Over 200,000 Syrians received such aid, and more than 4,000 of them were treated in Israeli hospitals from 2013 to September 2018. Many of the treated victims were civilians, often children. Allegations have been made that some were rebel fighters from the Free Syrian Army. This theory is supported by the claim that Israel had a strategic interest in aiding the rebels; they fought against both ISIL and Iranian-allied forces.

=== COVID-19 Vaccines ===
In 2021, a reported claimed that Israel agreed to fund an undisclosed number of coronavirus vaccines for the Syrian people via a Russian intermediary, in exchange for the release of an Israeli citizen who illegally crossed the ceasefire line. The claim was denied by Syria.

=== Israeli humanitarian assistance in the aftermath of the Syrian earthquake (2023) ===
Shortly after of the 2023 Turkey and Syria earthquake, the State of Israel received a Government of Turkey request for assistance from the Israel Defense Force in search and rescue and recovery efforts, and the IDF deployed a large team of approximately 500 search and rescue professionals to assist the Turks in the aftermath of the earthquake. Prime Minister Benjamin Netanyahu has said he also received a request from Syria through Russian interlocutors to send aid to Syria and assist in search and rescue operations there even though the two nations are technically in a state of war and do not have relations. Israel has plans to send aid to Syria, including humanitarian aid, medication, blankets, and tents. In contrast to the assistance provided by Israel to Turkey, any assistance provided to Syria by the Israeli government would not involve the military, according to IDF spokesman Ran Kochav who stated that the military was not involved in potential aid to Syria.

== Economic relations ==
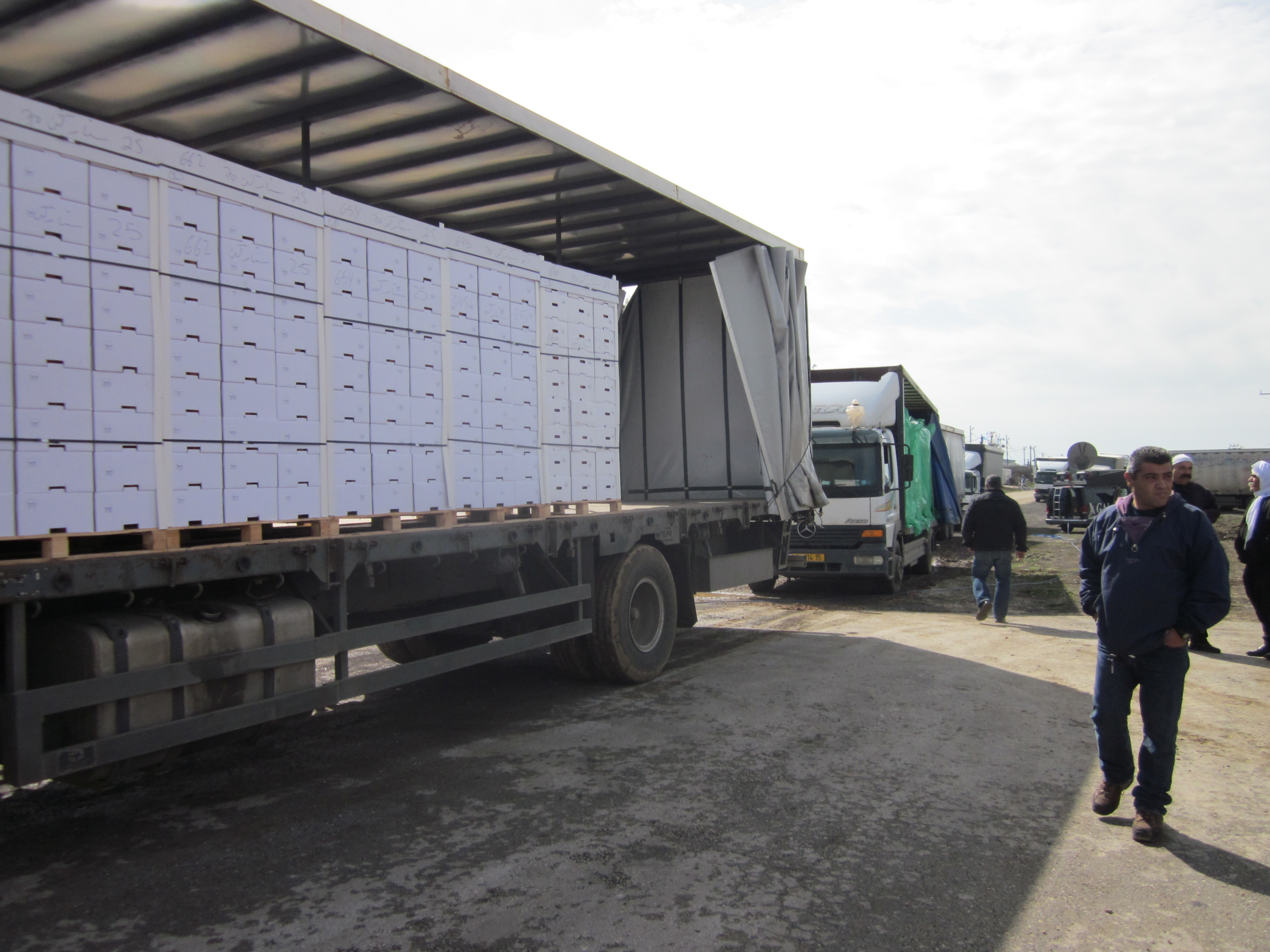
Apple exports to Syria at Quneitra crossing, February 2011

There have been virtually no economic relations between the two countries since the creation of the state of Israel, and a limited movement of people across the border. Syria continues to be an active participant in the Arab boycott of Israel.

As an exception, since 2004 Syria has accepted apples from the Israeli-occupied Golan Heights through the Quneitra crossing. In 2010, Syria accepted some 10,000 tons of apples grown by Druze farmers in the Golan Heights. Israeli minister Ayoub Kara called for an agreement with Syria over the supply of water to towns in the Golan Heights. Today, 10% of water in the Druze town of Majdal Shams is supplied by Syria, from the Ein al-Toufah spring. This arrangement has been in place for 25 years.

== Tourism and cultural exchange ==
In 2010, the Israeli government authorized a pilgrimage to Syria by a group of 300 Druze citizens of Israel interested in visiting religious sites there. A group of dancers from five Druze villages in the occupied Golan Heights travelled to Aleppo to perform in a dabka competition. Civilians are permitted to cross the ceasefire line at Quneitra for university studies and marriage. Syrian citizens of the Golan are entitled to free tuition, books and lodging. Since 1993, 67 Syrian brides have crossed into the Golan Heights and 11 brides from Golan have crossed into Syria.

== See also ==
- Attacks on US bases during the Gaza war
- Israel and the Syrian civil war
- Independent Israel–Syria peace initiatives
- Israel–Syria Mixed Armistice Commission
- War over Water (Jordan River)
