= Qalb Loze =

Qalb Loze قلب لوزة Qalb Lawzah
- Village
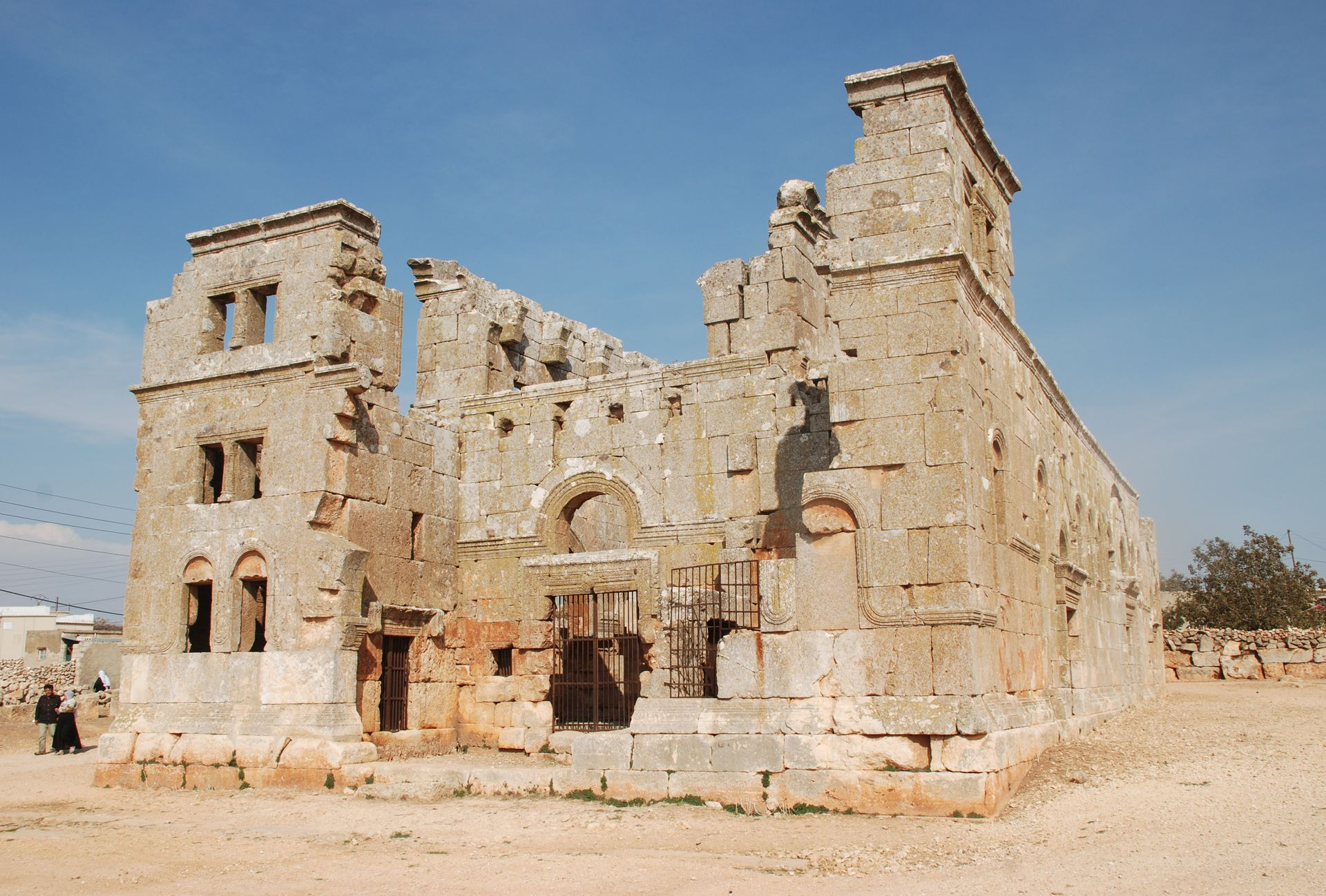
- The basilica at Qalb Loze

- Location in Syria
- Coordinates: 36°10′9″N 36°34′50″E
- Country: Syria
- Governorate: Idlib
- District: Harem
- Subdistrict: Qurqania

Population (2004)
  - Total: 1,290

Qalb Loze (Arabic: قلب لوزة, also spelled Qalb Lawzah or Qalb Lozeh) is a Druze village in northwestern Syria, administratively part of the Idlib Governorate located about 35 kilometres (22 mi) west of Aleppo. It is situated near the border with Turkey, in the A'la Mountain and is part of an area known as the "Dead Cities". According to the Syria Central Bureau of Statistics (CBS), Qalb Loze had a population of 1,290 in the 2004 census. Its inhabitants are predominantly Druze.

The village is well-noted for its 5th-century church and other Byzantine-era ruins. Its name Qalb Lozeh translates as "Heart of the Almond". Most of the residents work in agriculture and primarily cultivate tobacco and olives. The tobacco is used for the local cigarette industry.

== Geography ==
Qalb Loze lies at an elevation of 670 meters in the Idlib Governorate on the A'la Mountain (Jabal Summaq) plateau, a remote hilly region of western central part of the northern Syrian limestone massif, a few kilometers from the Turkish border. The place is near Barisha and is accessible from the main Aleppo-Antakya road by a secondary road that heads northeast. Nearby localities include Qurqania to the south, Kafr Dariyan to the east and Kafr Takharim to the west.

The area is ecologically vulnerable due to desertification, and its high altitude. Olive trees grow in the valley below the village, some dryland field crops are grown, and sheep are kept.

== Demographics ==
In the mid-1960s there were about 150 people living in Qalb Loze. It is still a small village with a population of 1,290 in the 2004 census by the Syria Central Bureau of Statistics (CBS). Its inhabitants are members of the Druze community, who inhabit 13 other villages in the vicinity.

== Church ==
The church at Qalb Lozeh dates back to the 460s AD and is one of the best-preserved churches of this period in the region. The church is the first known in Syria with the wide basilica, where the columns that in traditional Byzantine church architecture separate the aisles from the nave have been replaced with low piers and soaring arches that create the feeling of expanded space. It is strikingly similar in architectural style and craftsmanship to the large pre-Islamic Syrian churches in Turmanin, Androna, Ruweiha, and Karatin, which may have been built by the same workshops or guilds.

Gertrude Bell, the intrepid Middle Eastern diplomat, explorer and archaeologist, described this church as "...the beginning of a new chapter in the architecture of the world. The fine and simple beauty of Romanesque was born in North Syria." Since Gertrude Bell's visit in the early 1900s, the town has grown, and the church is now surrounded by modern houses.

The church was in a state of neglect for many years, even being used as a livestock stable from 2014 to 2016. In 2022 the church was cleaned of debris and trash, and destroyed or damaged parts of the floor were restored.

=== World Heritage Status ===
The site was inscribed by UNESCO as a World Heritage Site in 2011 as a part of the "Ancient Villages of Northern Syria" listing.

The church, with its "twin tower flanking the rose window" may have been an inspiration for aspects of the design of the Notre-Dame de Paris.

== Syrian civil war ==
During the ongoing Syrian civil war, the Druze inhabitants of Qalb Loze have refrained from participating in the fighting between opposition rebels and government forces. This is partially due to the fears of being involved in the civil strife and the insistence of rebel leaders that they remain neutral. Relations between the village's residents and the Sunni Muslim majority in the area are strong and most oppose the government of Bashar al-Assad. Qalb Loze has provided a safe haven for Druze deserters from the Syrian Army, clinics for wounded rebels, and shelter for local refugees fleeing the violence in their towns and villages. However, on June 10, 2015, 20 Druze were massacred there by the Nusra Front.

Since August 2021, a faction of Tahrir al-Sham called Katibat al-Ghuraba al-Turkistan started occupying the area.

== Bibliography ==
- Betts, Robert Brenton (2010). The Druze. Yale University Press. ISBN 978-0300048100.
- Boulanger, Robert (1966). The Middle East, Lebanon, Syria, Jordan, Iraq, Iran. Hachette.
- Nelles Guide (1999). Syria and Lebanon. Hunter Publishing, Inc. ISBN 3886181057.
