= Hamad Amar =

Israeli Druze politician

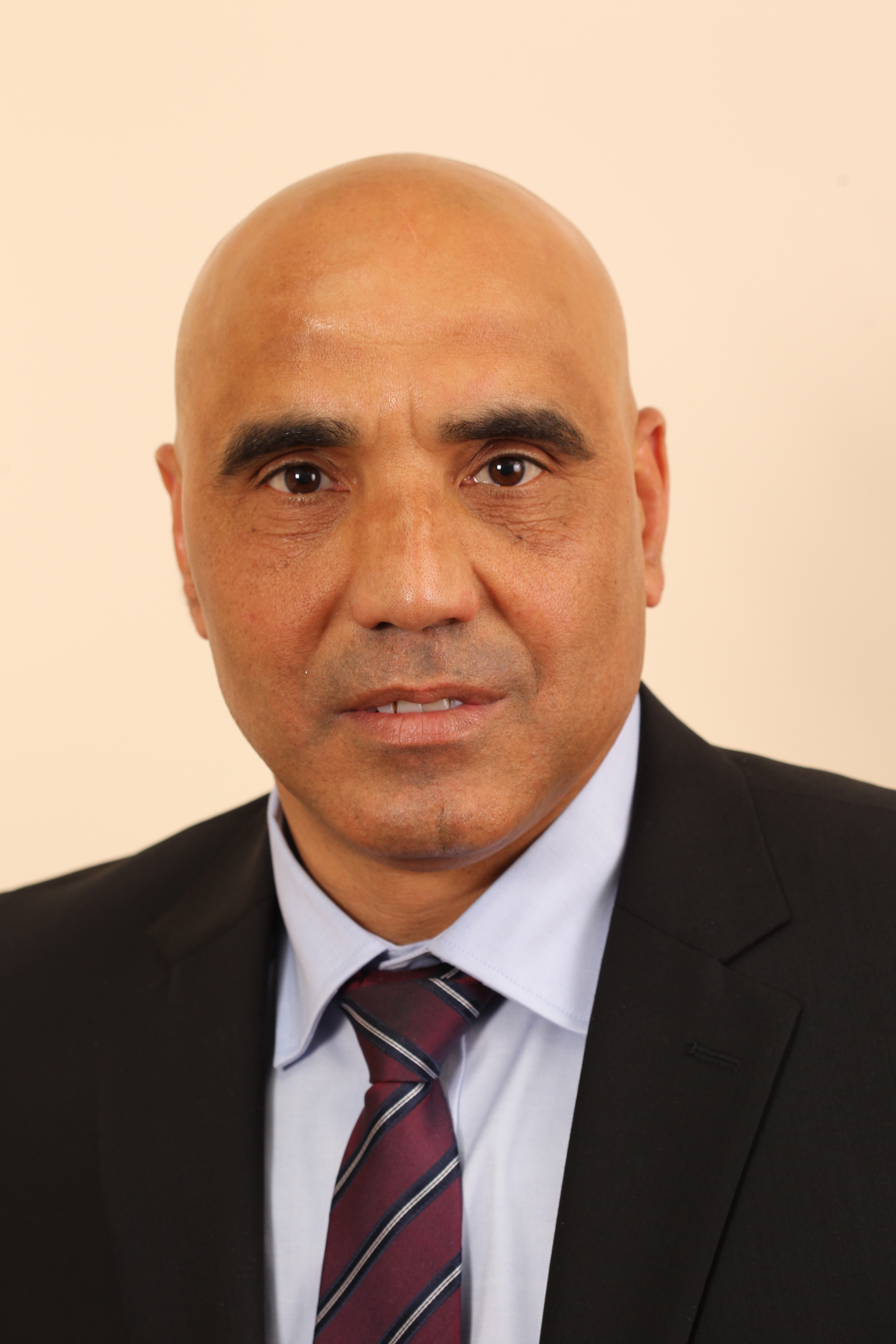
- Amar in 2024

Ministerial roles
- 2021–2022: Minister in the Finance Ministry

Faction represented in the Knesset
- 2009–2019: Yisrael Beiteinu
- 2019–2021: Yisrael Beiteinu
- 2022–: Yisrael Beiteinu

Personal details
- Born: 5 November 1964 (age 62) Shefa-Amr, Israel

Hamad Amar (Arabic: حمد عمار; Hebrew: חָמַד עַמַאר; born 5 November 1964) is an Israeli Druze politician who currently serves as a member of Knesset for Yisrael Beiteinu since 2022, previously serving from 2009 to 2019, and again from 2019 to 2021. Amar also served as a Minister in the Finance Ministry from 2021 to 2022.

== Biography ==
Hamed Amar was born in Shefa-Amr. He served in the Israel Defense Forces from 1982 to 1986. He earned a BA in social sciences from Zefat Academic College, and an LLB from the Academic Center for Law and Science. Amar lives in Shefa-Amr's al-Fuar neighbourhood, with his wife and three children. He has a fifth degree black belt in karate, and chairs the Martial Arts Association in Israel.

He runs a Druze youth movement that had 12,000 members as of 2013. The group emphasizes Druze culture and heritage and distributes thousands of food packets a month to families in need.

He was hospitalized in January 2017 at Hadassah Medical Center in Ein Karem, Jerusalem after suffering a fall at a hotel.

== Political career ==
He worked as an assistant to Avigdor Lieberman, while the latter was Minister of National Infrastructure. He was elected to Shefa-Amr's local council in 1998.

Prior to the 2009 elections, he was placed twelfth on the Yisrael Beiteinu list, and entered the Knesset when the party won 15 seats. He stated that the party's slogan "No citizenship without loyalty" is natural for the Druze community. He later explained his position: "When you contribute to society, and the society benefits, then you will reap the benefits as well." Amar was instrumental in plans for a subsidiary of General Electric to install wind turbines in northern Israel, citing the benefits from clean energy and new jobs.

He with fellow Druze MKs Akram Hasson and Saleh Saad opposed a proposed change to the citizenship law in 2018. He filed a petition against the legislation with the Supreme Court of Israel in July 2018. He expressed support for proposed changes to the legislation in August 2018 that would grant special recognition to the Druze community.

Amar was placed sixth on the Yisrael Beiteinu list for the April 2019 elections, and lost his seat as the party won only five seats. However, five months later he returned to the Knesset as Yisrael Beiteinu won eight seats in the September 2019 elections. After that election, he and fellow Beiteinu MK Oded Forer reportedly pressed Lieberman to shore up the Netanyahu coalition if he could not form a unity government with Benny Gantz's Blue and White party.

He was re-elected to the Knesset in the 2021 elections when Yisrael Beiteinu won seven seats. He was appointed Minister in the Finance Ministry in June 2021. Following his appointment, he resigned from the Knesset under the Norwegian Law and was replaced by Limor Magen Telem. In collaboration with other ministers, Amar led the Druze and Circassian Empowerment Program as Minister in the Finance Ministry. The coalition government passed a budget in November 2021 that included 3 billion NIS for the program, which will be used to invest in housing construction, local education, infrastructure, transportation and hi-tech employment opportunities for the Druze and Circassian communities.

Israel received a delegation of over 150 Syrian Druze from Hader, Syria in March 2025, a historic visit after fifty years of a closed border. The visit had top level Israeli diplomatic and security involvement and included a visit to the Nabi Shu'ayb tomb, a meeting with Israeli Druze leader, Muwaffaq Tarif, participation in the annual sheikhs march, and dedication of a khalwa. Amar coordinated the visit, and hopes they will continue for years to come. While the visit was criticized in the Arab world, he pointed out that "150,000 Palestinians work in Israel daily, [including] tens of thousands [that] came from Gaza up until the October 7 attacks". He expressed concern that the new leader of Syria, Ahmed al-Sharaa, is a former member of the Islamic State, and termed the 2025 massacres of Syrian Alawites a genocide. He was also worried about the threats to Druze in southern Syria, and hoped Israel would continue to defend them.

Months before the 2025 fires, he signed a letter along with other MKs calling on more preparation for extreme weather and fires. During Israeli Druze protests against the 2025 massacres of Syrian Druze, he issued a joint statement with Muwaffaq Tarif in May 2025 urging protestors to get out of the streets and go home.

== See also ==
- List of Arab members of the Knesset
- List of Israeli Druze
- Ayoob Kara
