= Daniel Sokatch =

American activist

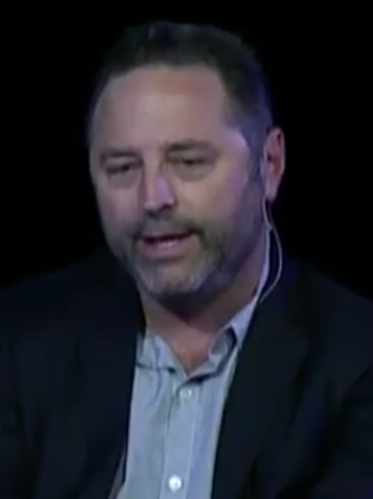
- Born: April 15, 1968 (age 58)
- Education: Brandeis University (BA); Tufts University (MA); Boston College (JD)
- Occupation: CEO of the New Israel Fund
- Known for: Social Activism
- Spouse: Dana Reinhardt
- Children: 2

Daniel J. Sokatch (born April 15, 1968) is an American activist, and the CEO of the New Israel Fund since 2009. Sokatch has been recognized for his leadership and influence, and he has been included multiple times in The Jewish Daily Forward's "Forward 50," an annual list of influential Jewish decision-makers, activists, and opinion-shapers.

== Early life and education ==
Sokatch was born on April 15, 1968, and grew up in Cheshire, Connecticut. His parents are Anne Stillerman Sokatch and Seymour Sokatch, who was the director of human resources at Yale University. He was influenced by his family members who encouraged his civic engagement and patriotism. When he was 11, his family moved to Cincinnati, Ohio.

Sokatch earned his Bachelor of Arts (BA) degree from Brandeis University, with a focus on history, Near Eastern Studies, and Judaic Studies. During his junior year, he lived in Ireland, studying the Irish conflict. After graduation, he worked in social services in Boston from 1990 to 1994. In 1994, he enrolled in rabbinical school at the Hebrew Union College-Jewish Institute of Religion (HUC-JIR) in Jerusalem, Israel. Later, he obtained a Master of Arts (MA) degree in Law and Diplomacy from The Fletcher School of Law and Diplomacy at Tufts University. He then pursued a Juris Doctor (JD) degree from Boston College Law School, graduating magna cum laude.

== Career ==
Sokatch has contributed articles to prominent publications, including the Los Angeles Times, The Jewish Daily Forward, The Jewish Journal of Greater Los Angeles, and he is featured in the anthology "Righteous Indignation."

He played a crucial role as a co-founder of the Progressive Jewish Alliance (PJA) and was its first executive director. The PJA aimed to engage young members of the Jewish community. Under Sokatch's leadership, the PJA's membership grew from 250 to over 4,000 in ten years. During his time at PJA, Sokatch also was a Visiting Instructor at the Hebrew Union College-Jewish Institute of Religion in Los Angeles, teaching a class on "Social Justice and Spiritual Activism." Additionally, he was part of the faculty at Reboot, a national network that connects Jewish Americans from literary, entertainment, hi-tech, political, social action, and academic communities. In 2012, the PJA merged with Jewish Funds for Justice to form Bend the Arc.

From 2008 to 2009, Sokatch was the Executive Director of the Jewish Community Federation of San Francisco, the Peninsula, Marin, and Sonoma Counties. Subsequently, he assumed the position of Chief Executive Officer at the New Israel Fund.

In 2010, The Forward acknowledged Sokatch's leadership of the New Israel Fund in the face of "an unprecedented attack against the group." He was recognized for formulating funding guidelines for NIF grants, ensuring that groups not supporting a two-state solution or the Jewish connection to Israel would not be funded.

== Personal life ==
Sokatch is a founding member of IKAR, a post-denominational Jewish congregation.

== Books ==
1. Can We Talk About Israel: A Guide for the Curious Confused & Conflicted.
