= Mickey Gitzin =

- מיקי גיצין
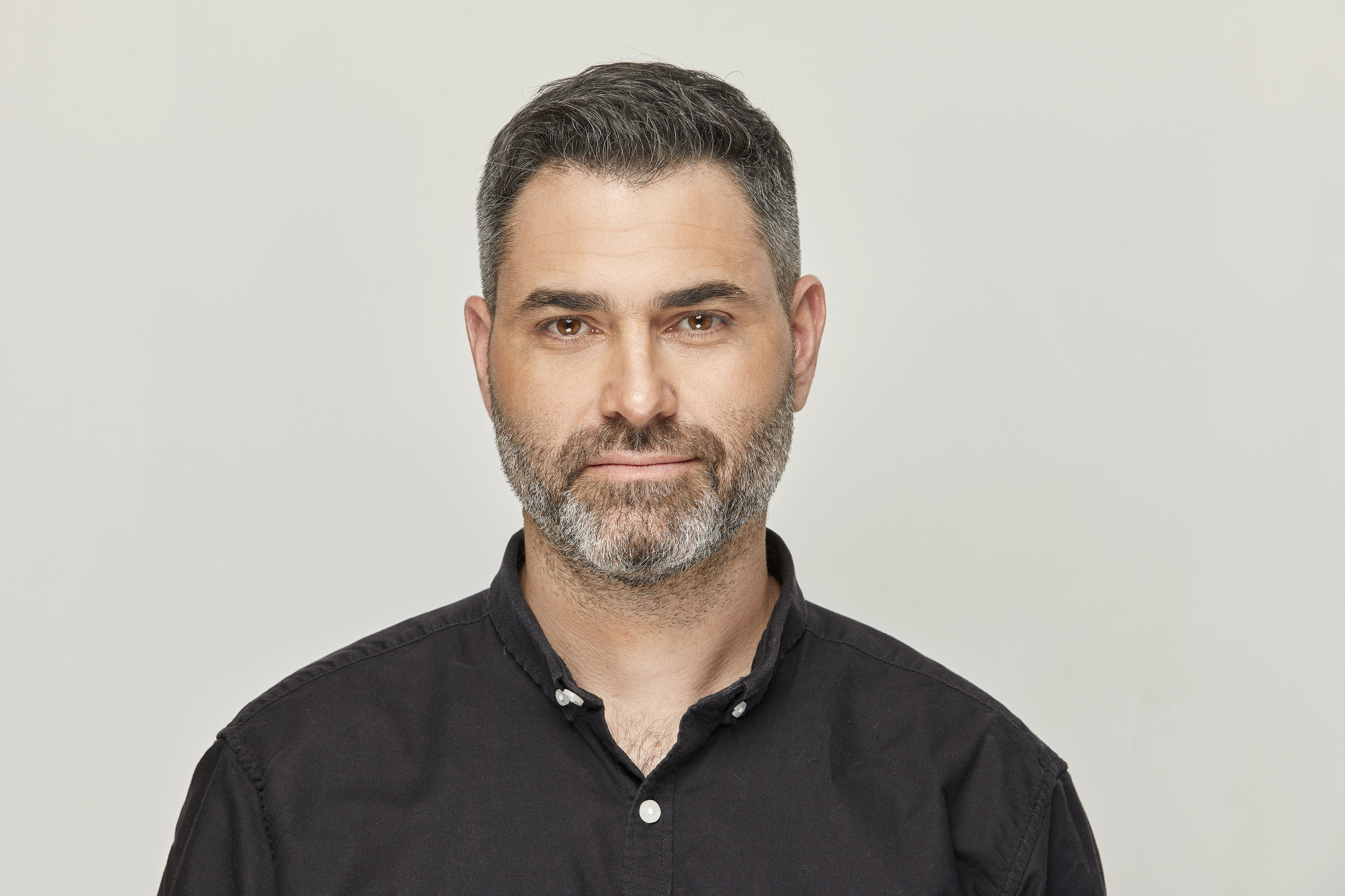
- Mickey Gitzin
- Born: Azor, Tel Aviv District, Israel
- Education: Hebrew University; University College London
- Title: Executive director of the New Israel Fund

Mickey Gitzin (Hebrew: מיקי גיצין; born 1981) is an Israeli peace activist and current acting CEO of the New Israel Fund, and former director of its Israeli branch.

== Early life ==
Gitzin was born to secular Russian-speaking Jewish parents who immigrated to Israel from the Soviet Union in the late 1970s. They settled in the Dalet neighborhood of Beersheba, but Gitzin was born in Azor, where he was raised in a public housing apartment. His parents and grandmother raised him and his sister with Soviet Russian influences and right-wing politics.

At age 13, he began keeping kosher fully to fit in with his peers, and as a form of rebellion against his parents.

Gitzin was active in his school's student government, becoming president of the student council. He also became involved with right-wing politics; during the 1992 elections, he handed out Likud flyers. However, he soon became involved with left-wing politics as part of a teenage rebellion against his parents.

Gitzin graduated from Hebrew University, and attended University College London on a scholarship for a master's degree in public policy.

Gitzin served in the Intelligence Directorate for his mandatory service in the Israeli Defense Forces, during which time he continued to develop his left-wing politics. After his service was completed, he became a Jewish Agency shaliach to an American Jewish community in South Bend, Indiana, where he was reassured that his secular beliefs were not in conflict with his Jewish worldview.

== Activism ==
Upon returning to Israel after working in the United States, Gitzin was hired to establish Be Free Israel, a coalition of left-wing organizations active in religious and state matters.

In 2012, Gitzin protested draft exemptions for ultra-Orthodox Israelis.

In 2015 and 2016, Gitzin was a member of the Tel Aviv Municipal Council.

In late 2017, Gitzin became executive director of the New Israel Fund.

In 2018, Gitzin's criticism of the Israeli government drew scrutiny on social media from Israeli prime minister Benjamin Netanyahu.

In January 2023, Gitzin called the proposed Israeli judicial reforms "an attack on all of democracy".

In December 2025, Gitzin was named acting CEO of the New Israel Fund.

Gitzin has written for Haaretz and Ynet.

== Personal life ==
While working in the United States, Gitzin began dating a Catholic American woman. She returned with him to Israel, and they lived together for three years before separating, after which Gitzin came out as gay. Gitzin has been with his current partner since the early 2010s, with the two living in Tel Aviv.

As of 2016, Gitzin was a member of the Meretz Party.
