= Rachel Liel =

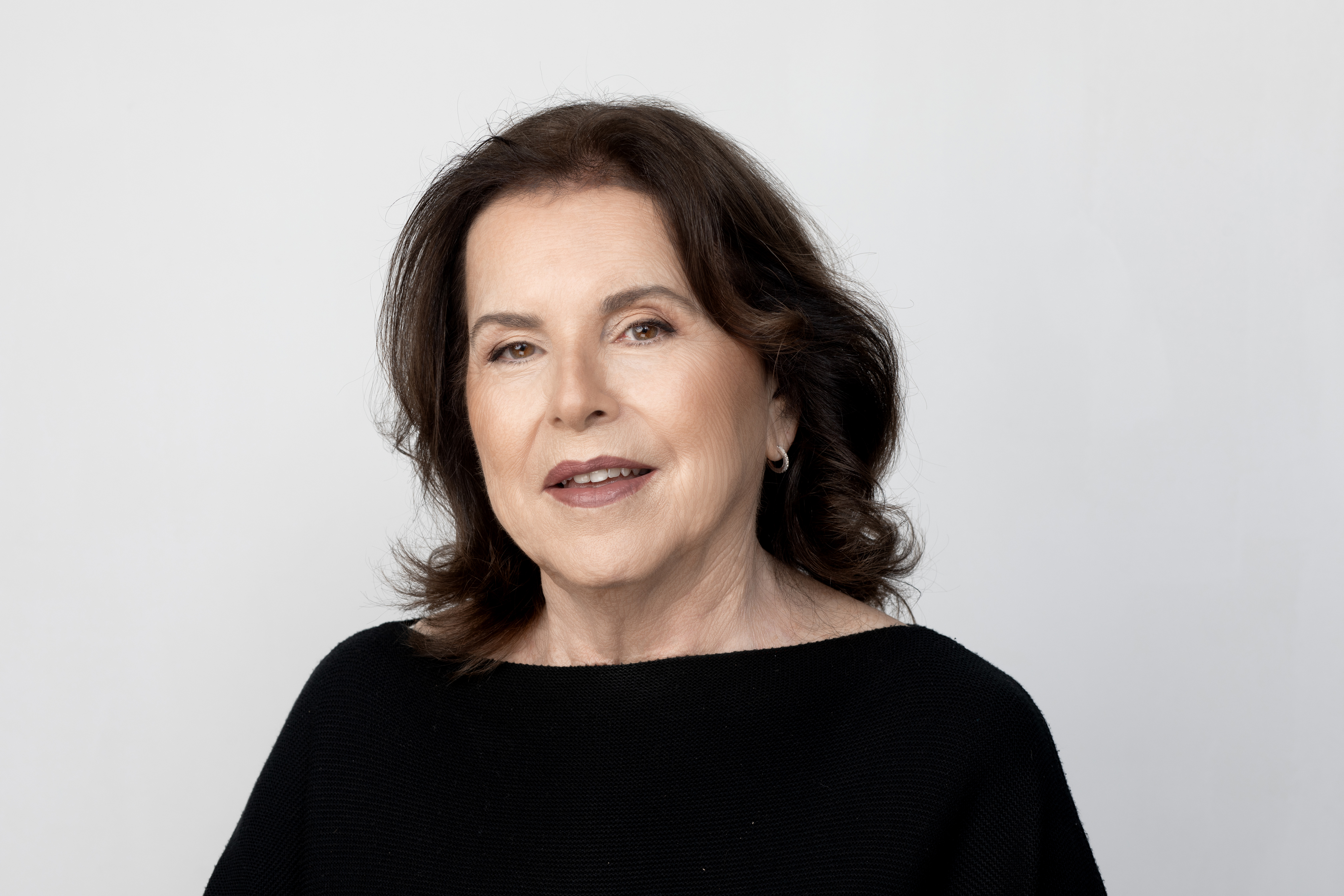
Liel in 2023

Rachel Liel (Hebrew: רחל ליאל; born 1950) is an Israeli left-wing activist, currently (since 2023) serving as Board President of the New Israel Fund. Liel was Israel director of the NIF between 2009 and 2017, and chairperson of the Association for Civil Rights in Israel between 2017 and 2022.

== Early life ==
Liel was born in the kibbutz Maoz Haim and grew up in Herzliya. Her father, Meir Tzealim, was a doctor and her mother Naomi was a school principal. Her parents were Polish immigrants who escaped to the USSR during World War II, enduring several years of imprisonment in a Soviet labor camp before moving on to Israel. Liel describes her parents as intensely patriotic and her father as a lifelong Labor Party supporter.

== Career ==
Liel has Master's degrees in sociology/anthropology and in social work. She worked in the Israeli government as a Policy Analyst in the Department of Social Policy Planning of the Prime Minister’s Office, and as Deputy Director of the Rehabilitation Services Department in the Ministry of Labor and Welfare. She joined Shatil, NIF's implementation arm, in 1998 and served as its director for 11 years before becoming the NIF's Israel director in 2009. Liel served as director during a period of intensifying right-wing criticism of the organization; she was the target of death threats.

== Political views ==
Liel considers herself a leftist and an Israeli patriot. In 2015 she told Globes newspaper that she remained a believer in the two-state solution: "Most people will say that they do not believe that tomorrow will yield peace with the Palestinians including many left-wingers but that's different from saying that we need to start a process that in some years will bring sanity to our region."

In April 2025 she was among 40 Israeli signatories of an open letter calling for the return of the Israeli hostages in Gaza, an end to the Gaza war, and a two-state solution to the conflict.

== Personal life ==
Liel is married to the former diplomat Alon Liel. One of their three children is the Knesset journalist Daphna Liel. Her first husband, Zvi Shorar, was killed in the Yom Kippur War when she was 23.
