= Israel's National Student and Youth Council =

Israel's National Student and Youth Council (Hebrew: מועצת התלמידים והנוער הארצית, Mo'etzet HaTalmidim VeHaNo'ar HaArtzit) is an elected body representing the Israeli students and youth in Israel from the 7th grade to the 12 grade in front of the Israeli decision makers of the Ministry of Education (Israel) and in other government offices. The council, which was established in 1993, operates under the Society and Youth Administration of the Ministry of Education. The council is an umbrella organization for all the Israeli regional youth councils, and student councils.

The council's representatives are elected democratically and annually from the district youth councils (Jerusalem, Tel Aviv, Center, Haifa, Rural, South, and North). The council comprises youth from the different sectors: religious, secular, Jewish, Arab, Druze and a Bedouin representative.

The National Youth Council representatives mediate between Government decision makers and the Youth representatives. the council representatives, as the official representatives of the Israeli youth, regularly take part in meetings dealing with a wide range of issues which all relate to Israeli students and youth. Those meetings take place with the Minister of Education, in the committees of the Ministry of Education, in various Knesset conferences, and in addition they participate in various meetings of Knesset Committees (especially in the Knesset Committee on Education, Culture and Sports, The Knesset Committee on Child Rights, The Knesset Committee on Drug Abuse, as well as the Transportation Subcommittee in The Knesset Committee for Economy). The representatives mostly participate in committees dealing with youth-related issues such as: children's rights, violence, delinquency and youngsters at risk - cut off from mainstream youth.

== Structure ==
The National Council consists of representatives elected from 6 regional Youth Councils (North, Haifa, Center, Jerusalem, Tel Aviv, and Southern districts) and one nationwide "settlement administration district" - the rural district. Those councils in turn are chosen from the Youth Councils of the towns, cities, and local area councils (Administrative areas enclosing, kibbutz's and moshavim) in that district. Any such municipal area council is itself elected from the Student Councils of the schools in the area, as well as representatives from local youth movements or any other youth organizations. Student Councils, of course, are elected from within the student body of the school. This method ensures both fair representation at every level for students from every locale and background, and easy and swift communication and co-operation between the various councils. The entire system of councils is estimated to contain some 20–30,000 representatives around the country.

Every council, from the school through to the national, adheres strictly to democratic procedure. A secretariat, including, but not limited to, Chairman, Vice-Chairman, Spokesperson, Secretary General, and Auditor as well as the representatives to the next level council, are elected for each council by its members.

Each and every council must function according to its own bylaws which have been drafted in a fair and open process and approved by the council plenum. In order to have representation at the following level of council, each council's bylaws must comply with the "supreme bylaws (תקנון על)" as drafted and approved by the National Conference of Student and Youth Councils.(הועידה הארצית של מועצות התלמידים). The conference is the highest authority within the council hierarchy - an annual congress of some 700 representatives from every council in the country, which approves an annual policy resolution which guides the activity of the councils.

Each council has a representative role and a constituency. The National Council represents all the students in any and all institutions of relevance, such as the Knesset, various government ministries and bodies, first and foremost the Ministry of Education (A sub-section of which provides the council with logistical support.), the media, etc. A district council works in a similar way on a regional level. A local council does the same, representing the youth and the students in the city or municipality. A school council does so in a school, acting as the student voice to the teachers and management, on any and all issues, from deciding to which hour a school party will continue, to choosing whether to institute a school uniform, to negotiating the details of a student strike.

Such rigidly democratic institutions are necessary, living up to the legality given to the existence of councils in the "Law of Student Rights", due to the nature of Council activities, which can be split roughly into two spheres: representative and activist.

In 2006 graduates of the Israel's national student and youth council founded an association named Bematana. The association's mission is to promote young leaders who are elected as representatives in student and youth councils in Israel. in 2012 the council held the International Youth Leadership Conference under the slogan "Take The Lead!"

== Local councils ==
Local councils do much the same at a municipal level, organizing events for all the students in the city, like used school-book fairs, parties, sports tournaments, town clean-ups, meetings with students from different background, such as secular and religious, or Jewish and Arab, etc. Local councils may differ from city to city, each one displaying its own unique character, and different areas of activity according to whatever the needs and wants of the population may be.

== District Councils ==
District Councils and the National Council work on a regional/national level, working independently or with the ministry of education, local and school councils or various other organizations, such as charities and nonprofit funds, or companies and the media, in both independent projects carried out by the National/District council, and in providing tools and contacts and activities which Local and School councils can make use of in their work.

== Legislation ==
The following Israeli laws were enacted in the Knesset after originally proposed by the Israel's National Student and Youth Council:

Local Authorities (Head of Youth Unit. Council of Students and Youth), 2011

promotes and regulates the field of informal education in Israel. According to the law: each local authority will work to promote informal education field, the - by promoting educational activities and cultural frameworks. Required to establish a Local students and Youth council.

Students Rights Law

The first law of its kind in the world. The law states the principles regarding the student. The law is the spirit of human dignity and the principles of the United Nations Rights of the Child Agreement. Among the categories of law: the right to education, the prohibition of discrimination, and handling the permanent exclusion of a student from an educational institution, Right to student representation by the district students' and council in the district hearing committees, the right to take the matriculation examination, the establishment and activities of the student council at school and the duty of confidentiality (student privacy).

Local Authorities (Elections)

Right to vote in elections to the local authority - from age 17

Law "Municipalities Ordinance"

Required to establish a municipal committee on advancing the status of the child. Among the committee members will be the chairman of the local student and youth council.

"Municipalities Ordinance" Law

Required to establish a municipal committee on education. Among the committee members will be the chairman of the local student and youth council.

Lowering the age of issuing driver's licenses to 17.

For the first three months after obtaining the license, the young driver will accompany the adult driver.

== The Council's achievements ==
Due to the National Council's involvement in the Knesset committees and in the Israeli public discourse, in 2000 it managed to bring forward the enactment of an Israeli Pupils' Rights Law (חוק זכויות התלמיד) for the approval of the Knesset, which prohibit discrimination of students for sectarian reasons in admission to or expulsion from an educational institution, in establishment of separate educational curricula or holding of separate classes in the same educational institution, and rights and obligations of pupils. This law has been enforced by the Supreme Court of Israel, prompting protests from Orthodox families who objected to sending their children to integrated schools. In addition, the Israeli Pupils' Rights Law required that every educational institution in Israel would establish a student council.

In 2002, the National student and youth council chairman Koby Tsoref was invited to light one of the Yom Ha'atzma'ut (Israel's Independence Day) twelve torches traditionally kindled in the annual national Yom Ha'atzma'ut ceremony, marking the organization's contribution to the Israeli youth and the organization's part in promoting their rights.

Among other things, the National Council initiated an amendment to the Municipalities Ordinance Act which lowered the age of the electors in the elections of the local authorities from 18 to 17. The National Council has been involved in promoting a number of changes in certain laws regarding reception of driver's licenses and which regard young drivers, as well as the reduction of the period in which young drivers must drive while being accompanied by an experienced driver, and the signing of a collaboration covenant with the Local Government Center and with the Israel. In addition, in 2011 the Council managed to prevent the cancellation of student rights law.

== Chairmen of the Council ==
Each year a new chairman is elected for the National Council. Chairmen are elected democratically by the National Council representatives.

These are the chairmen of the National Council since its founding:

Name	Term of office
Zvika Hearn	1993–1994
Efrat Chaham	1993–1994
Eva Rosenthal	1994–1995
Keren Weinberg	1995–1996
Liad Mudrick	1996–1997
Oded Cohen	1997–1998
Ben Miust	1998–1999
Yael Armoni	1999–2000
Daphna Liel	2000–2001
Sarit Ben-Ami	2001
Koby Tsoref	2001–2002
Ravid Ben-Zeev	2002–2003
Shirin Gabai	2003–2004
Ziv Chen	2004–2005
Shay Bialik	2005–2006
Hagay Oren	2006–2007
Nir Ketraru	2007–2008
Uriel Ifrach	2008–2009
Hadar Shuman	2009–2010
Asher Alon	2010–2011
Ofek Hernik	2011–2012
Yuval Kahlon	2012–2013
Gal Yosef	2013–2015
Eliav Batito	2015–2016
Hanan Yazdi	2016–2017
Yuval Halabia	2017–2018
Liel Malkevich	2018–2019
Amit Ribak	2019
Nimrod Paperni	2020
Itai Kroitoro	2020
Yuval Gudker	2020–2021
Omer Shahar	2021–2022
Ran Shay	2022–2023
Sapir Mosafi	2023–2024
Roni Kamai	2024–2025
Dror Cohen	2025–2026
Rotem Getraide	2026–present
