= Qalb Loze massacre =

2015 massacre of Syrian Druze in Qalb

- Part of the Syrian Civil War
- Location: Qalb Loze, Idlib Governorate
- Date: 10 June 2015
- Target: Druze
- Attack type: Shootout/massacre
- Deaths: 20 Druze, 3 al-Nusra Front members
- Perpetrator: Al-Nusra Front

The Qalb Loze massacre was a massacre of Syrian Druze on 10 June 2015 in the village of Qalb Loze in Syria's northwestern Idlib Governorate. The village was under the control of a coalition of Islamist rebels, when a Tunisian commander of one group in the coalition, the al-Nusra Front, tried to confiscate the house of a villager accused of working for the Syrian government.

When the villagers protested, Tunisian al-Nusra fighter Abu Abd al-Rahman Al-Tunisi and his men opened fire on the protesting villagers, who were accused of blasphemy. A Nusra fighter claimed the villagers opened fire first. In the end, at least 20 people, including elderly individuals and a child, were killed. Three al-Nusra members were also killed.

Despite claims by al-Nusra that those responsible for the crime would be held accountable, Abu Abd al-Rahman al-Tunisi, the primary perpetrator, remained free for years following the incident. He was ultimately killed in a firefight with Hay’at Tahrir al-Sham (HTS) in 2021 when he was involved in the kidnapping and murder of the education minister of HTS's Salvation Government. Notably, according to the majority of Islamic jurisprudence schools, a Muslim cannot be executed as punishment (Qisas) for killing a non-Muslim (Kafir), even if the non-Muslim holds the status of Dhimmi (a legally protected person). In such cases, only blood money (Diyya) is required as compensation. However, if the victim does not hold Dhimmi status, no Diyya is required to be paid. According to Sunni schools of theology, Druze are generally not considered Muslims.

The massacre sparked widespread condemnation in neighbouring Lebanon, which has a considerable Druze minority. Walid Jumblatt responded that "Any inciting rhetoric will not be beneficial, and you should remember that Bashar Assad’s policies pushed Syria into this chaos". In contrast, the Lebanese Druze party chief and former government minister Wiam Wahhab urged the Druze to form an armed force to defend their community in an angry televised speech saying “We will not accept to sell Druze blood!“. His call was much in line with that of the Syrian Druze spiritual leader who directed the Druze to join the Syrian Army. Subsequently, Druze fighters from Sweida assisted the Syrian Army in recapturing an airbase from the Nusra Front. Prior to the Qalb Loze killings, Nusra had forced several hundred Druze to convert to Sunni Islam, as well as being accused of desecrating their graves and damaging shrines. On June 22, a group of Druze lynched a wounded Syrian in the Golan Heights who was being transported to Israel for treatment, as they claimed he was a rebel fighter.

== See also ==
- 2025 massacres of Syrian Druze
- List of massacres during the Syrian Civil War
- Druze in Syria
