= Independent Israel–Syria peace initiatives =

Since a state of war has been existing between Israel and Syria, several independent peace initiatives had taken place. Some of them were symbolic, others included more direct steps to get Israelis and Syrians together. Most of them were led by Israeli citizens and by Syrians living abroad.

== Notable initiatives ==
- Alon Liel, former Israel Foreign Ministry director general, held unofficial talks with Syrian mediaries under the Swiss government's patronage over 2004–2007. He had also initiated a peace movement that published a petition by hundreds of Golan Heights residents to open peace talks with Syria.
- The Israeli band PingPong tried to promote peace between Israel and Syria during their performance on Eurovision Song Contest 2000.
- Ibrahim Suleiman, Syrian-American negotiator has visited the Knesset Foreign Affairs and Defense Committee in April 2007, insisting that a peace deal with Syria is reachable within six months since Syrian president Bashar al-Assad is in favor of it. The Israeli Foreign Ministry officially rejected Suleiman's meeting with Israeli officials.

== Seel also ==
- Israel–Syria relations
