= Kafr Dariyan =

Kafr Dariyan كفردريان
- Village
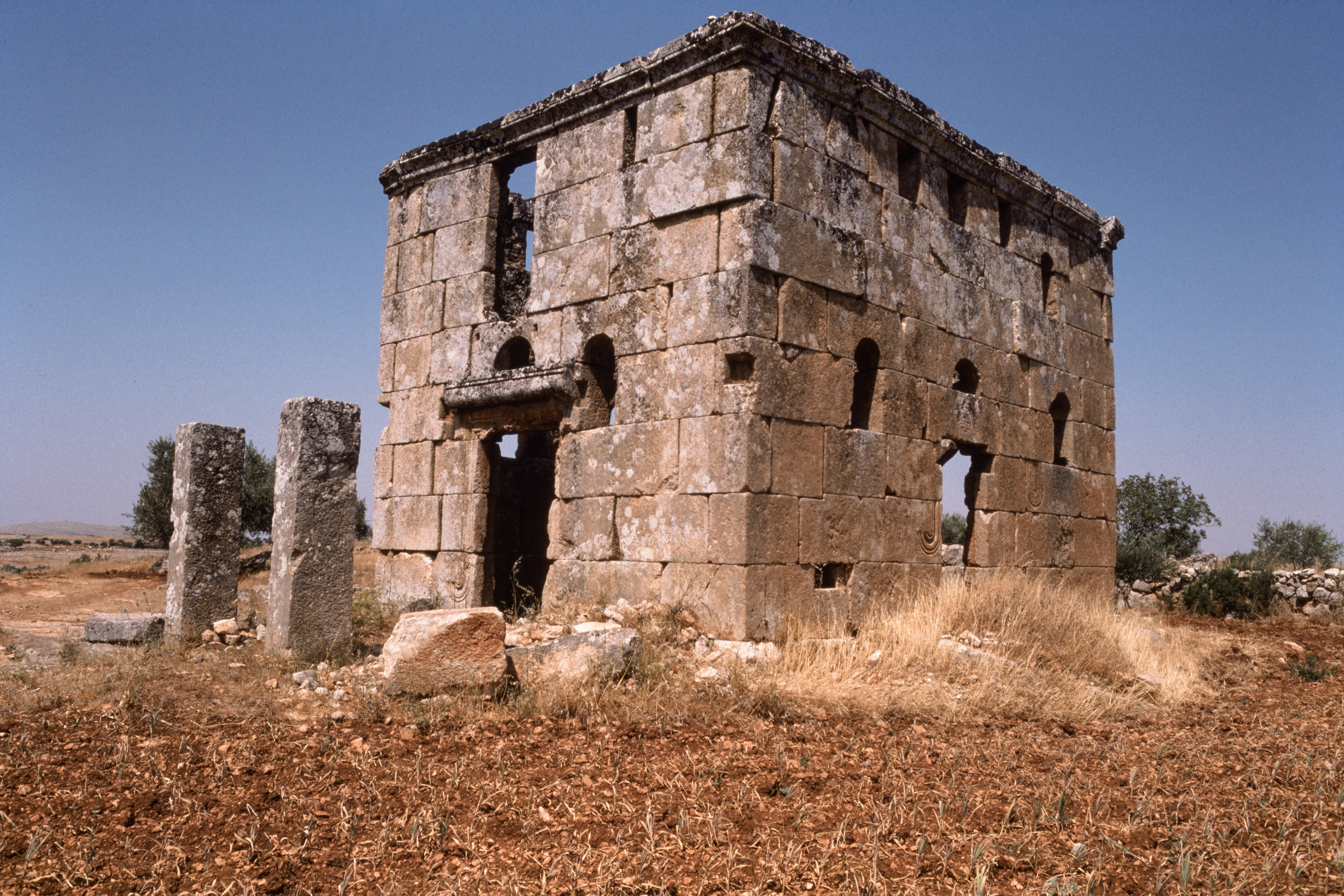
- Monastery of Yonan the Stylite, Kfer Daryan

- Location within Syria
- Coordinates: 36°10′22″N 36°39′54″E
- Country: Syria
- Governorate: Idlib
- District: Harem
- Subdistrict: al-Dana

Population (2004)
  - Total: 3,580
- Time zone: UTC+2 (EET)
  - Summer (DST): UTC+3 (EEST)

Kafr Dariyan (Arabic: كفردريان also spelled Kfar Drian) is a village in Syria, administratively part of Idlib Governorate. It is situated on the northern slopes of the Harim Mountains. Nearby localities include Sarmada to the east, Killi to the south, Qurqania to the southwest and Barisha to the west. According to the Syria Central Bureau of Statistics (CBS), Kafr Dariyan had a population of 3,580 in 2004.
