= April 2025 massacres of Syrian Druze =

Extrajudicial killings against Druze in Syria

- Part of Southern Syria clashes (April–May 2025) and Druze insurgency in Southern Syria.
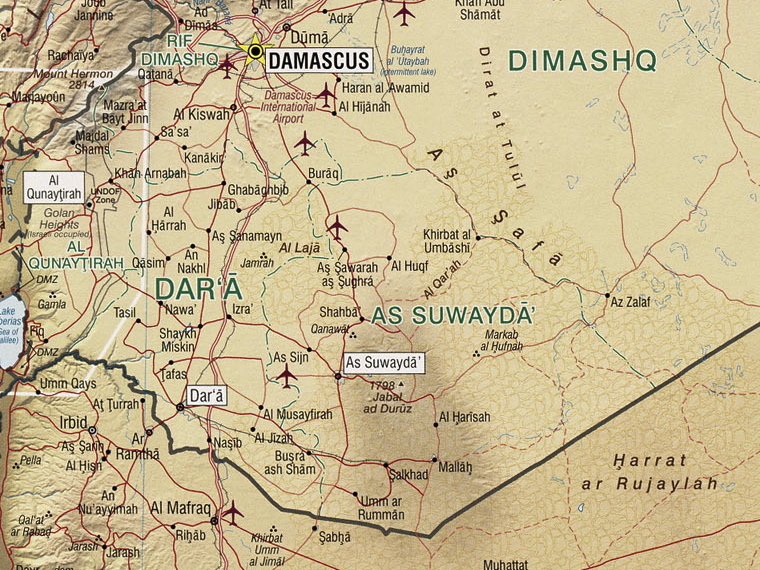
- 2004 map of the Hauran region in southern Syria, which includes Jabal al-Druze
- Location: Suwayda, Rif Dimashq governorate
- Date: 28 April 2025 – 2 May 2025 (4 days)
- Target: Syrian Druze
- Attack type: Extrajudicial killings, Sectarian violence
- Deaths: 101
- Perpetrators: (Syria) Syrian Armed Forces (Syria) General Security Service; Local Bedouins

Beginning on 28 April 2025, sectarian violence between Druze militias, Syrian transitional government military units, and affiliated militias resulted in the deaths of several Druze civilians, many of whom were extrajudicially killed.

A much larger massacre of Druze people in Syria would occur during the July 2025 fighting in Suwayda.

== Background ==
The Druze constitute approximately 3% of Syria's population, making them a significant religious minority within the country. Their belief system blends elements of Islam, Christianity, and ancient philosophies, which many orthodox Sunni Muslims consider heterodox. Historically, the Druze have maintained communities across Syria, with significant populations in the southern province of Suwayda, Jabal al-Druze, and in southern Damascus suburbs.

Under the Assad regime, the Druze cultivated relative autonomy in their strongholds while accepting protection from the central government, particularly against jihadist aggression following the outbreak of civil war in 2011. When demonstrations against Bashar al-Assad began in 2011–2012, many Druze who initially participated in peaceful protests later accepted weapons from the regime and formed local militias. This arrangement allowed them some protection while distancing themselves from being fully identified with the Assad government.

Throughout the Syrian civil war, the Druze community faced targeted violence from various extremist groups. In June 2015, fighters affiliated with Al-Nusra Front attacked the northern Druze village of Qalb Loze, resulting in at least twenty casualties. Throughout this period, members of the Druze community were subjected to kidnappings, with many either released after ransom payments or killed.

=== After fall of Assad regime ===
Since the overthrow of Bashar al-Assad on 8 December 2024, negotiations have been ongoing between the new Syrian government and Druze leadership regarding the community's integration into the Syrian state. These negotiations have progressed slowly due to concerns among Druze leaders about the background of Syria's new president, Ahmed al-Sharaa, who previously led the Islamist rebel organization Hay'at Tahrir al-Sham (HTS). Druze representatives have sought measures of autonomy from central government control.

Clashes broke out in late February 2025 in Jaramana between Druze militias and the General Security Service.

In March 2025, Syria's new leader Ahmed al-Sharaa signed an agreement with Druze representatives from Suwayda province. This agreement integrated the community into state institutions while granting certain concessions, including locally recruited Druze police forces and recognition of their distinct cultural identity.

Beginning in March 2025, significant sectarian violence occurred in Syria's coastal Latakia Governorate, where attacks by remaining supporters of the deposed Assad regime against Syrian government security forces triggered retaliatory violence that resulted in the deaths of at least 1,500 people, most of whom were Alawite civilians.

In March and April 2025, Israeli authorities permitted large delegations of Syrian Druze religious leaders to enter Israel for Pilgrimages, despite the official state of war between Syria and Israel.

== Conflict ==
On 29 April 2025, a wave of violence occurred in Jaramana, a predominantly Druze suburb of Damascus. According to the Syrian Observatory for Human Rights (SOHR), this initial outbreak resulted in at least ten fatalities. The conflict reportedly stemmed from the circulation of a fabricated audio recording that was falsely ascribed to a Druze religious leader, Marwan Kiwan, purportedly containing derogatory statements about the Prophet Muhammad. Kiwan subsequently appeared in a video statement categorically denying any connection to the inflammatory recording, stating that whoever created it intended to provoke discord among Syrian communities. Syria's Interior Ministry confirmed the recording had been falsely credited.

Despite a temporary resolution in Jaramana, violence resurged several hours later in nearby Ashrafiyat Sahnaya, located southwest of Damascus. According to Syria's Interior Ministry, at least 16 additional civilians and security personnel were killed when unidentified armed individuals attacked a security checkpoint overnight.

Social media footage appeared to show armed tribal groups intercepting vehicles from Suwayda attempting to reach Ashrafiah Sahnaya. According to Tarek el-Shoufi, who heads the Suwayda Military Council, Druze defenders in Sahnaya were running short of ammunition while relief forces were blocked and attacked, resulting in at least one fatality.

=== Ambush ===
On 30 April, SOHR said a convoy of Druze fighters traveling from Suwayda Governorate to support fellow Druze in Sahnaya was ambushed by forces that were affiliated with the Ministries of Interior and Defense, leading to 43 deaths. Some of the bodies were burned and others mutilated while the perpetrators reportedly chanted anti-Druze slogans. According to survivors of the ambush, some of the Druze who surrendered were executed. According to Hawar News Agency, at least eight government-affiliated fighters were also killed.

=== Massacres ===
On 29 April, the Syrian Observatory For Human Rights (SOHR) said that armed groups affiliated with the Ministry of Defense executed two citizens at a poultry facility on the outskirts of Sahnaya.

The next day, SOHR said that government-aligned forces launched attacks against the villages of Rasas and al-Soura al-Kabira in the Suwayda Governorate, with mortar shell bombardments targeting positions near civilian residences, and that al-Soura al-Kabira came under heavy machine gunfire from government loyalist positions surrounding the village.

On 1 May, the number of field executions carried out in Ashrafieh Sahnaya recorded by SOHR increased to nine. SOHR said that eight of the executions were carried out inside a poultry farm, while another targeted a man in his house. SOHR reported that former Mayor of Sahnaya, Hussam Warwar, was executed in the street along with his son, hours after he had appeared in a video thanking security forces for deploying to the town.

SOHR said that government security forces detained an Iraqi Kurdish Channel 8 journalist and camerawoman documenting the ongoing violence in Sahnaya, releasing them after confiscating their equipment and phones. SOHR characterized the event as a violation of freedom of the press and the necessary protection of journalists.

== Responses ==
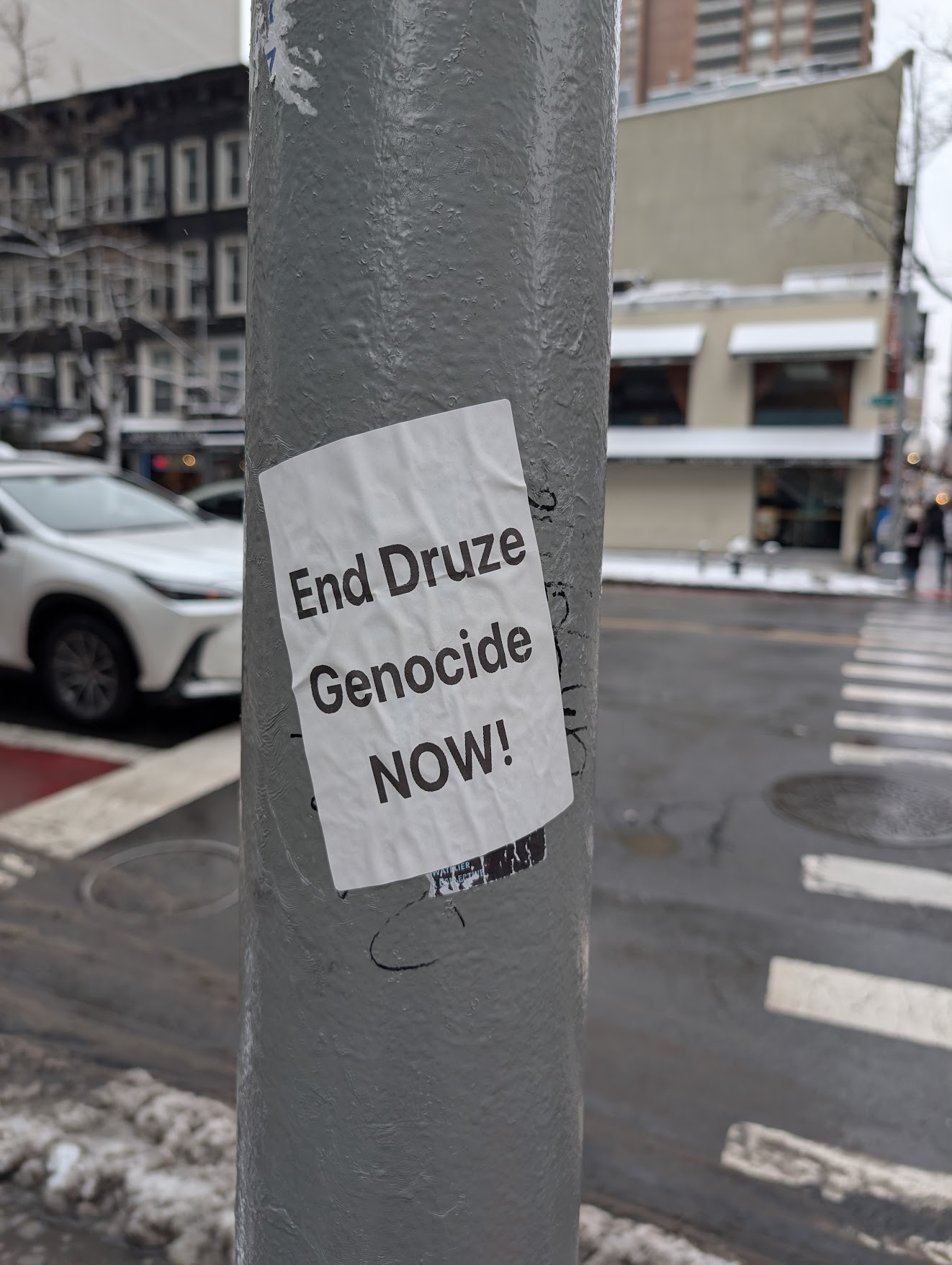
2025 flyer in New York City protesting a "Druze genocide"

The violence near Damascus provoked substantial anger among the Druze population in Suwayda Governorate. Druze military leader El-Shoufi characterized the situation in Jaramana as a "massacre" and stated that Ashrafiah Sahnaya was "surrounded and being attacked by terrorists." He further claimed that Syrian security forces were preventing Druze reinforcements and the military council from providing assistance to their community members.

On 1 May, Sheikh Mowafaq Tarif, the spiritual leader of Israel's Druze community, made a public appeal during a military ceremony in Isfiya, explicitly calling for Israeli intervention to protect Syrian Druze communities facing violence near Damascus. Sheikh Hikmat al-Hijri, an Israel-aligned Druze spiritual leader in Syria, characterized the Syrian government's actions as a “genocidal campaign” against the Druze.

=== Israel ===
The escalating violence prompted direct military action from Israel. On 30 April, Prime Minister of Israel Benjamin Netanyahu stated that Israeli Defense Forces had conducted a strike against what he described as an "extremist group" ready to attack the "Druze population south of Damascus."

Israel subsequently executed a second military strike that reportedly killed members of the Syrian security forces in the vicinity of Damascus. Following these actions, Israel's military chief of staff issued orders to prepare for potential attacks on Syrian government targets if violence against the Druze population continued. Five Syrian Druze civilians injured by sectarian violence were evacuated by the Israeli Defense Forces to Ziv Medical Center in the northern Israeli city of Safed.

Dozens of Israeli Druze citizens held protests at the Kafr Yasif junction located near Acre in the Western Galilee where they burned tires and blocked roads in order to protest the Syrian government's targeting of Druze communities. The protests were condemned in a joint statement by Druze MK Hamad Amar and Druze leader Muwaffaq Tarif.

== See also ==
- Southern Syria clashes (July 2025–present)
- 2025 massacres of Syrian Alawites
- List of massacres during the Syrian civil war
- Sectarianism and minorities in the Syrian civil war
