= Daphna Liel =

Israeli journalist (born 1983)

- דפנה ליאל
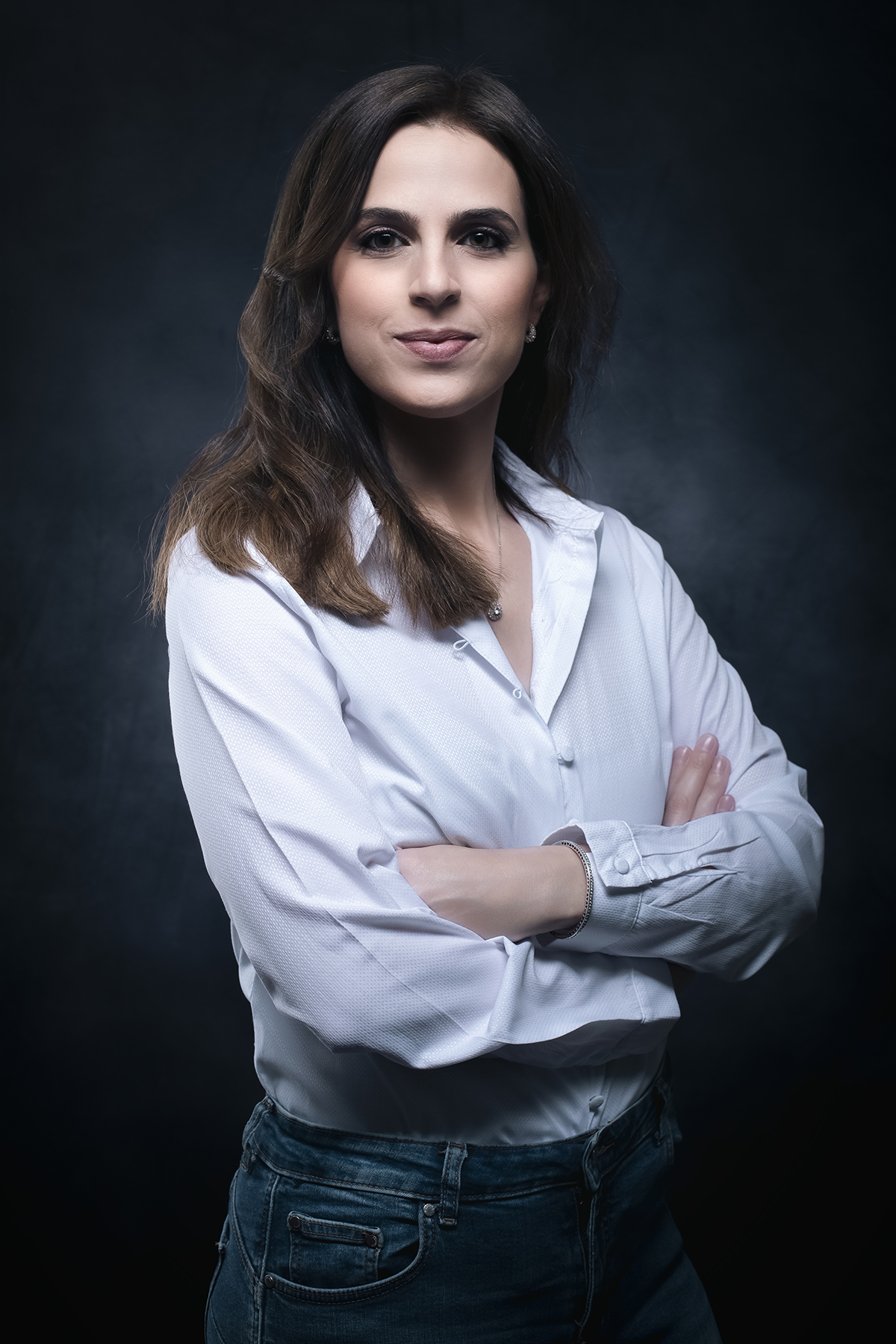
- Born: Dapha Leah Liel; May 30, 1983 (age 43); Jerusalem, Israel
- Occupations: Knesset Reporter, Substitute News Anchor
- Years active: 2001-present
- Employer: Channel 12 News
- Spouse: Yoav Bauman
- Children: 2

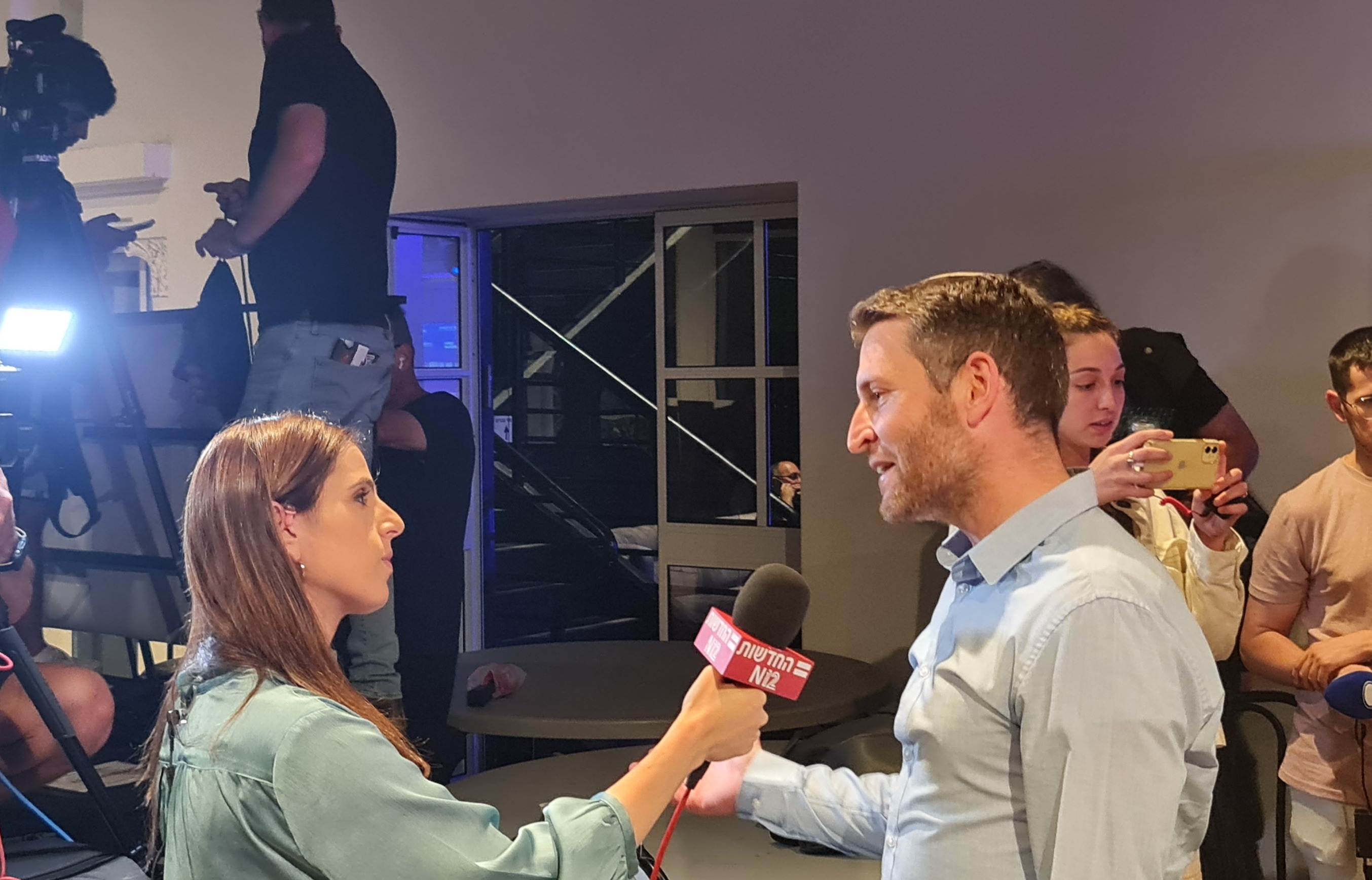
Daphna Liel interviewing Yaya Fink at the 2022 Israeli Labor Party conference

Daphna Leah Liel (Hebrew: דפנה לאה ליאל; born May 30, 1983) is an Israeli journalist who serves as a Knesset correspondent, political commentator, and substitute news anchor for Keshet 12's News Company.

== Early life ==
Liel was born to Alon, a diplomat, and Rachel Liel, a political activist. Liel grew up in many places, including Ankara, Atlanta and South Africa. She attended orthodox religious schools. Her paternal grandparents immigrated to Israel from Germany, while her maternal grandparents came from Poland.

She studied at Harel High School in Mevaseret Zion. In her senior year, during the 1999–2000 school year, she served as the Chair of Israel's National Student and Youth Council. In this role, she participated in Knesset discussions on the Student Rights Law.

Daphna Liel completed her mandatory IDF service as a war correspondent and editor at Israeli Army Radio. She holds a bachelor's degree in political science and international relations from the Hebrew University of Jerusalem.

== Biography ==
After her discharge, she served for about four years as a political reporter and anchor of the main news edition on the Knesset Channel. In July 2008, she began working as a news flash anchor for the news company of Channel 2, while simultaneously serving as their correspondent in Jerusalem.

Later, she was appointed education correspondent. In this role, she conducted investigative reports on social issues, including overcrowding in kindergartens. These reports helped lead to the addition of an extra teaching assistant for kindergarten teachers. For this investigative work, Liel was awarded the 2015 Primor Prize for Investigative Journalism. In October of that year, Liel was appointed to Channel 2's Knesset correspondent.

Between March 2017 and October 2022, she hosted the podcast Osim Politika ("Doing Politics") on the Osim Historia ("Making History") podcast network, where she discussed various political issues with different guests. In May 2022, a book based on the podcast, also titled Osim Politika, was published by Yedioth Sfarim.

Since 2018, she has also served as a substitute anchor on the Channel 12 programs Shesh Eim ("Six O'Clock with") and Pgosh Et HaItonut ("Meet the Press").

=== In Culture ===
In December 2022, Liel's character was added to the satirical imitation show Eretz Nehederet.

== Personal life ==
Liel is married to biologist Yoav Bauman, and they have two children. They previously lived in the moshav Sho'eva and currently reside in Herzliya.
