= Barisha, Harem District =

Barisha بَارِيشَا
- Village
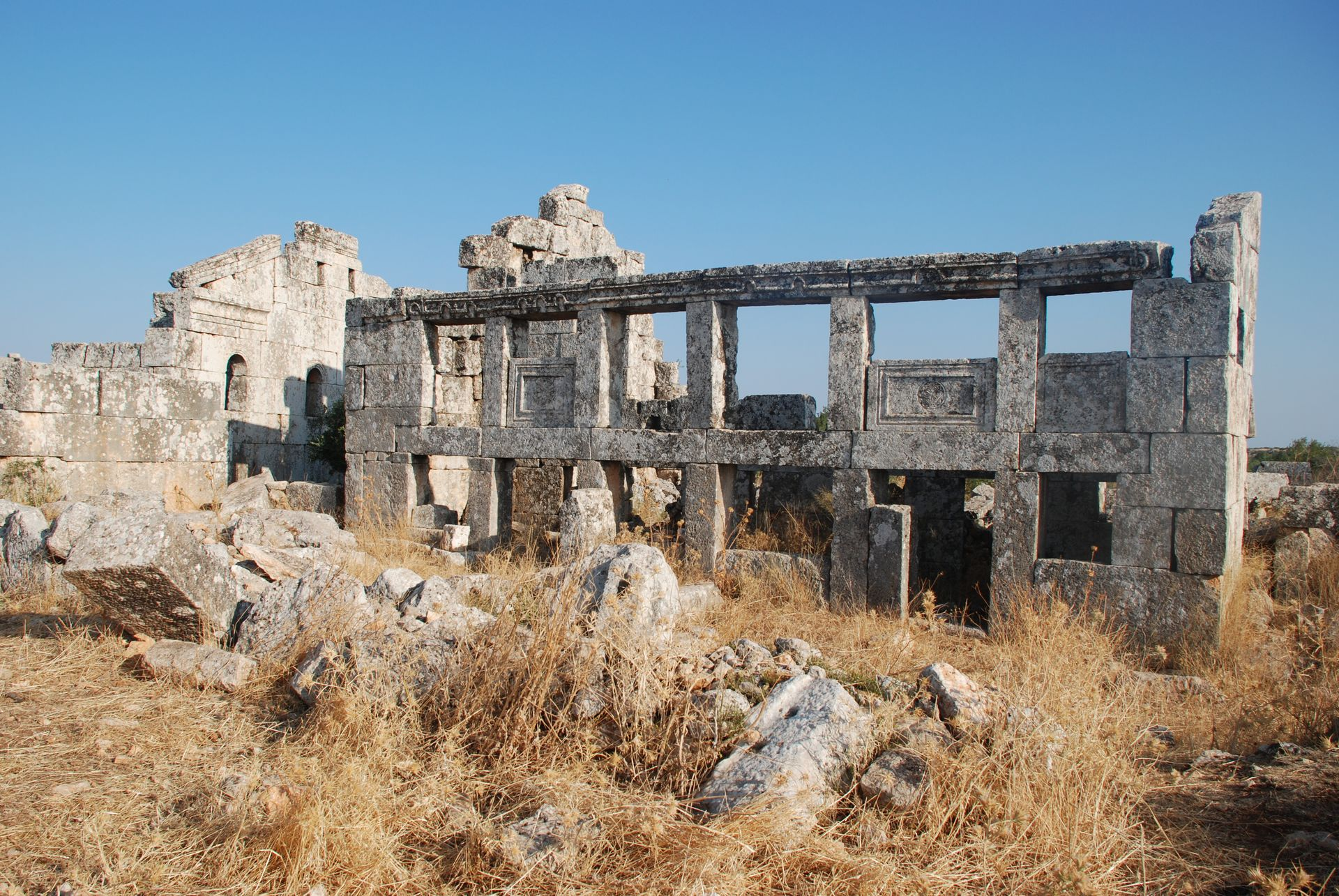
- Villa in Barisha with porch pillars. To the left is the east gable of a basilica.

- Location in Syria
- Coordinates: 36°09′58″N 36°38′10″E
- Country: Syria
- Governorate: Idlib
- District: Harem
- Subdistrict: Qurqania

Population (2004)
  - Total: 1,143

Barisha (Arabic: بَارِيشَا, Bārīšā; also spelled Baricha and Barischa) is a village in northwestern Syria, administratively part of Harem District in the Idlib Governorate. In the 2004 Syrian census Barisha was listed with a population of 1,143. More recent reports place the population at about 7,000.

It is situated in the A'la Mountain and is part of an area known as the "Dead Cities." Barisha is located in Harem District of Idlib Governorate in the Ala Mountains near the Syrian border with Turkey. It is in the central region of the northern Syrian limestone massif, about 5 kilometres (3.1 mi) from Qalb Loze across a valley. The karst topography of the limestone left many small caves, some of which were habitations. Barish is located on the site of an ancient settlement, Dayhis. There are early Byzantine period ruins including residential buildings, cisterns, olive presses, and a church in the village. The modern village is about 500 metres (1,640 ft) north of the ruins. The ruins are surrounded by olive groves and small plots of mostly wheat.

== Location ==
The place is located in the Idlib Governorate on the eponymous ridge, the Jebel Barischa, in the central area of the northern Syrian limestone massif. The road in a northerly direction after one kilometer at the junction towards Dahis over and reached after four kilometers at an intersection, the small village of Ras al-Hosn, after two more kilometers, the early Byzantine neighboring towns Baqirha and Deir Qeita. From here it is another eight kilometers east to the junction with the Aleppo road at the Syrian-Turkish border crossing Bal al-Hawa. The most famous place in the region is Qalb Loze, which is eight kilometers west, separated from Barischa by a valley on the also running in a north–south direction Jebel il-Ala. Other ancient ruins can be found nearby. To the south, the road leads over Deir Seita to Idlib.

From the modern village without infrastructure the ruin field can be seen half a kilometer to the north. It lies on a flat slope beyond a valley in the midst of olive groves and cereal fields in small plots, which are separated by reading stone walls. The ancient remains of the wall are partly grown in bushes.

== Townscape ==
The cultivation of olives and wine was the heyday of the town from the 4th to the 6th century. In Barischa, in comparison to other dead cities, an above-average number of olive presses have been preserved. There were in the center of the village in the area of the church some stately two-storey buildings, which are referred to as residences and on one side a pillar portico was introduced. Striking is the high number of smaller and very simple residential buildings with rectangular plain windows without portico, whose upright walls are made of huge stone blocks.

Barischa, unlike most of the dead cities was archaeologically studied late and is therefore little known in the general literature. The first thorough examination of the 6th-century church was made by Christine Strube in the 1970s.

The only church built by a local workshop is a three-naved basilica with a rectangular chancel to the east flanked by lateral adjoining rooms. It has a straight eastern wall. This combination is a development of the late 5th century. The northern side room was accessible from the side aisle by a door whose framing consists of bands in the bas-relief. Only the rock is more elaborate by a wavy band with foliage. Because of the door, this room can be identified as Diakonikon, the southern adjoining room being connected to the nave by a wider arch, as is typical for the Martyrion (relic chamber). In the completely preserved eastern wall of the gable, there are four windows with curved lintels framed by slight relief at the same height. In contrast, the decorative band at the cornice is defined by a deep groove.

As water reservoirs for the dry season served in many places caves in the karstic rocks, which are recognizable only at Schöpföffnungen in the ground. In Barischa, a cistern carved out of the massive limestone subsoil with above-ground vaults has been preserved. The inside dimensions are about 4 × 6.5 meters. To the bottom of the approximately eight-meter deep cistern, a monolithic stone staircase leads down the wall. The vertex of the vault is three meters above the terrain.

== Incidents ==
ISIS leader and self-proclaimed caliph Abu Bakr al-Baghdadi killed himself and two children with a suicide vest while United States special operations forces (SOF) pursued him in his hideout in the outskirts of Barisha on 27 October 2019.
