= Karatin al-Kabir =

Karatin al-Kabir كراتين الكبير
- Village
- Location in Syria
- Coordinates: 35.6500°N 36.9589°E
- Country: Syria
- Governorate: Idlib
- District: Maarrat al-Nu'man District
- Subdistrict: Sinjar Nahiyah

Population (2004)
  - Total: 93
- Time zone: UTC+2 (EET)
  - Summer (DST): UTC+3 (EEST)
- City Qrya Pcode: C4036

Karatin al-Kabir (Arabic: كراتين الكبير) is a Syrian village located in Sinjar Nahiyah in Maarrat al-Nu'man District, Idlib. According to the Syria Central Bureau of Statistics (CBS), Karatin al-Kabir had a population of 93 in the 2004 census.
