= New Israel Fund =

American non-profit organization

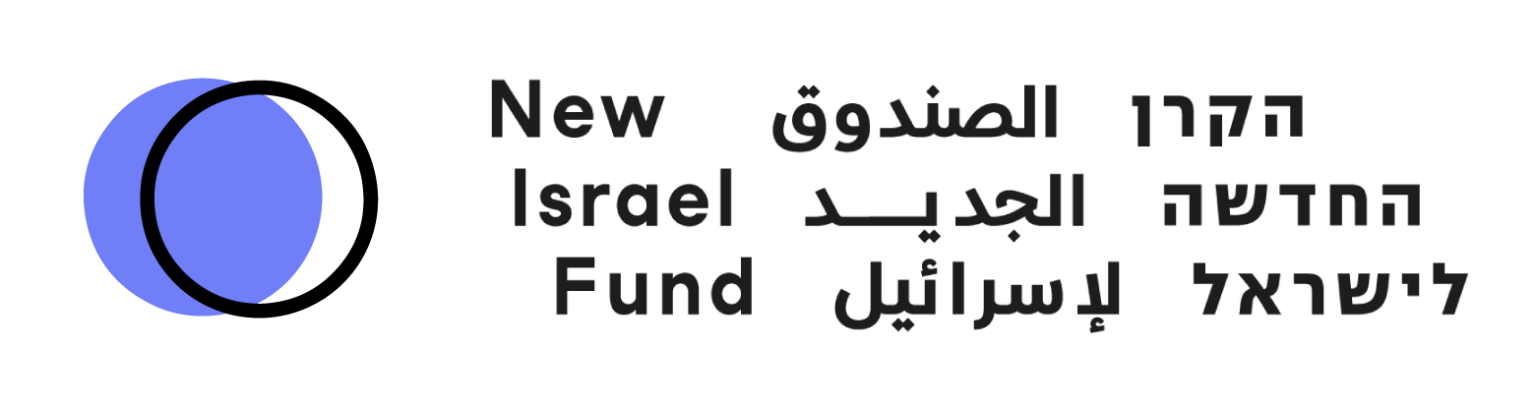
- Abbreviation: NIF
- Founded: 1979; 47 years ago
- Tax ID no.: 94-8607722
- Legal status: 501(c)(3) non-profit Non-governmental organisation
- Purpose: Human rights, democracy, social justice, economic justice, shared society, Palestinian citizens of Israel, religious freedom
- Headquarters: New York City, U.S.
- Location: International offices: Israel, Canada, United Kingdom, Australia, Switzerland, Austria, Germany
- Region served: Israel
- CEO: Daniel Sokatch
- Executive director (Israel): Mickey Gitzin
- Board president: Rachel Liel
- Revenue: US$28,208,112 (2013)
- Expenses: US$31,947,018 (2013)
- Endowment: US$2,191,608
- Employees: 57 (2013)
- Volunteers: 270 (2013)
- Website: www.nif.org

The New Israel Fund (NIF; Hebrew: הקרן החדשה לישראל, romanized: HaKeren HaKhadashah L'Yisra'el; Arabic: الصندوق الجديد لإسرائيل, romanized: aṣ-Ṣundūq al-Jadīd li-ʾIsrāʾīl) is a United States–based non-governmental organisation (NGO) established in 1979. It describes its objective as social justice and equality for all Israelis. The New Israel Fund says it has provided $300 million to over 900 Israeli civil society organizations. It describes itself as active on the issues of civil and human rights, women's rights, religious status, human rights for Palestinians in the Israeli-occupied territories, the rights of Israel's Arab minority, and freedom of speech. The New Israel Fund is the largest foreign donor to progressive causes in Israel.

Its financial support for Breaking the Silence, Adalah, B'Tselem, Yesh Din, and other groups allegedly hostile to Zionist values has drawn criticism from Israel’s political right.

== History ==
The New Israel Fund was established in 1979 in California, and is credited with seed-funding "almost every significant cause-related progressive NGO in Israel". Since its inception the fund has provided over US$250 million to more than 900 organizations. NIF states that while its position is that "Israel is and must be a Jewish and democratic state" it says it was "among the first organizations to see that civil, human and economic rights for Israeli Arabs is an issue crucial to the long-term survival of the state".

== Ideology ==
NIF describes itself as "the leading organization committed to democratic change within Israel". Its stated objective is "to actualize the vision of Israel's Founders, that of a Jewish and democratic state that, in the words of the Declaration of Independence, 'ensures complete equality of social and political rights to all its inhabitants irrespective of religion, race or sex.'" It views Israel as "the sovereign expression of the right of self-determination of the Jewish people and as a democracy dedicated to the full equality of all its citizens and communities". It advocates for civil and human rights, religious tolerance and pluralism, and closing the social and economic gaps in Israeli society, especially those among Jews and Arabs.

The New York Times wrote that NIF "advocates for equality and democracy" in Israel. The New York Times has also reported that the organization funds "Arab-run, non-Zionist groups" without necessarily agreeing with all the positions of those groups, but rather out of support for their right to be heard.

Daniel Sokatch, CEO, says that in line with their "core values of democracy and equality, we support two states for two peoples and we oppose the occupation and the settlement enterprise".

In June 2012, NIF marched with a "progressive cluster" in the New York Celebrate Israel parade; the cluster included Ameinu, Americans for Peace Now, B'Tselem USA, Partners for Progressive Israel, and Rabbis for Human Rights-North America.

=== BDS ===
NIF is opposed to the global Boycott, Divestment and Sanctions (BDS) campaign. It has stated that it does not support global BDS and will not support organizations with BDS programs but that its policy allows NIF the discretion to "engage in dialogue with an important organization that signs one letter supporting divestment rather than summarily dismissing them". Naomi Paiss, Director of Communications, described the campaign as "a tactic that embodies the message that Israel cannot and will not change itself, and for that reason, we think it is inflammatory and counter-productive".

However, the NIF states that it will "not exclude support for organizations that lawfully discourage the purchase of goods or use of services from settlements."

== Organization ==
The New Israel Fund is a registered 501(c)(3) nonprofit philanthropic organization in the United States. The New Israel Fund's headquarters are located in New York City. The New Israel Fund also has offices in Jerusalem, Washington, D.C., Boston, Chicago, Miami, Los Angeles, San Francisco, Toronto, London, Sydney, and Basel.

== Leadership ==
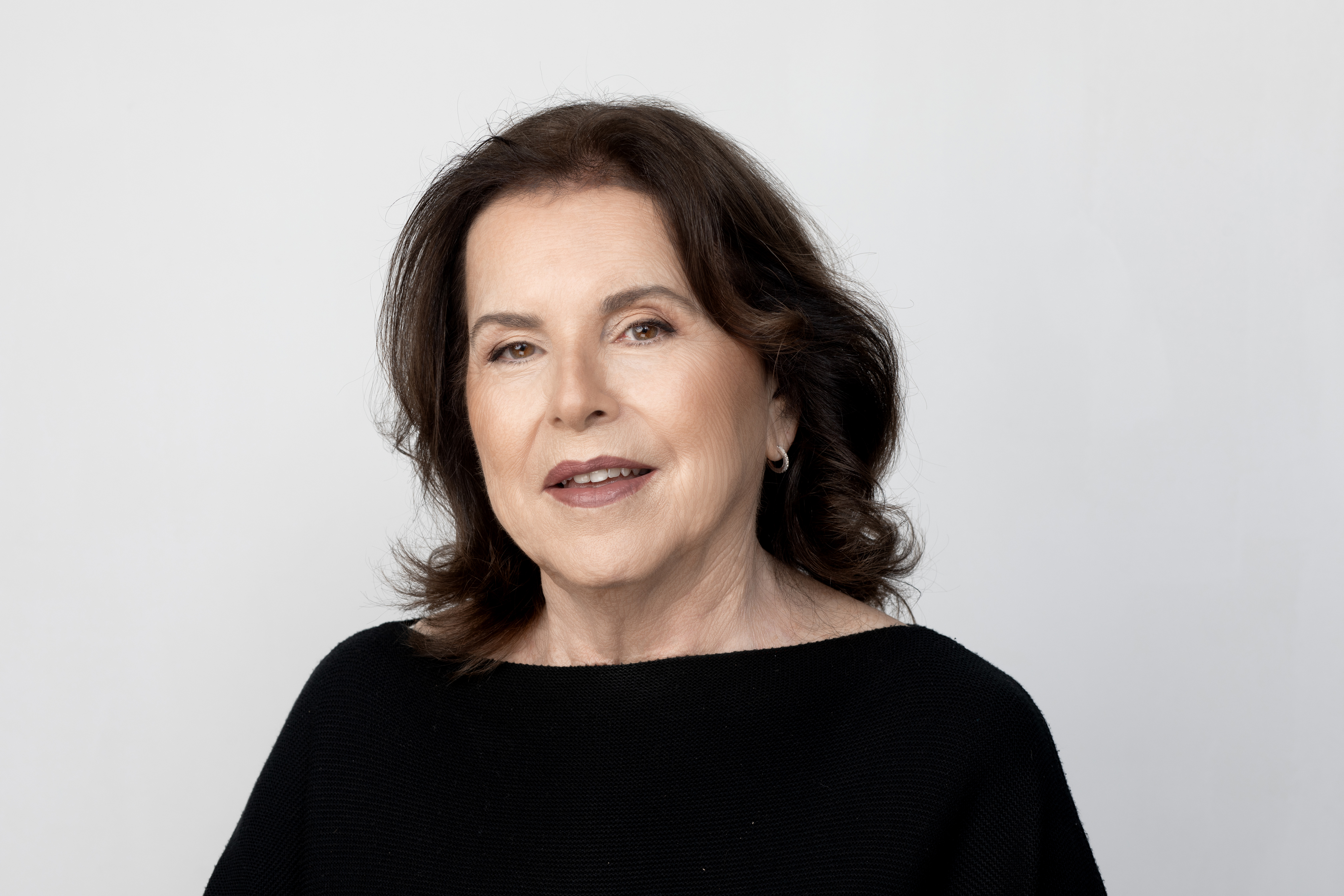
Rachel Liel, the NIF's board president since 2023

In October 2009, Daniel Sokatch became the new chief executive officer of the New Israel Fund, after working as the executive director of the Progressive Jewish Alliance and the San Francisco Jewish Federation.

Rachel Liel, formerly director of Shatil, became Israel executive director on 1 November 2009.

Rabbi Brian Lurie, former executive director of the San Francisco Federation and executive vice president of the UJA, was the chair of NIF's board of directors, following the term of Naomi Chazan, former deputy speaker of the Israeli Knesset.

Attorney Talia Sasson, best known for her authorship of the report detailing Israeli government support of illegal settlements, succeeded Rabbi Lurie as NIF president in June 2015.

The board consists of 21 community leaders, activists, academics and philanthropists from the United States, Israel, Canada and the United Kingdom.

Other board members include law professor Peter Edelman, economist Franklin Fisher, and Bedouin scholar Amal ElSana Alh'jooj. International Council members include Israeli novelist Amos Oz, Nobel Prize winner Aaron Ciechanover, former Deputy Attorney General Judith Karp, former Knesset Speaker Avram Burg, and Michael Walzer.

== Activities ==
=== Grantmaking ===
In 2014, NIF contributed about US$24 million to groups in Israel.

In September 2010, NIF published guidelines defining who is eligible to receive its grants on its website for the first time.

Naomi Paiss, NIF's vice president of public affairs, says that it is the actions of grantee organizations that are looked at to determine whether they qualify for funding, and not the personal views of individuals involved. In her words, NIF "won't support organizations working to deny the Jewish people's right to sovereign self-determination". She explains that it is not relevant whether the "leaders of (Israeli-)Arab organizations prefer a multinational, multicultural state" so long as the work by the grantees is not "designed to change the State of Israel".

=== NGOs ===
In 2014 NIF had a budget of $31,057,804, and awarded $14.7 million in grants to grantees including Adalah, B'Tselem, Breaking the Silence, Association for Civil Rights in Israel, the Council for Peace and Security, Molad: The Center for the Renewal of Israeli Democracy, Mossawa Center and Alliance Israélite Universelle; in addition, NIF directs "donor advised" grants in which supporters make gifts directly to NGOs on advice from NIF grant experts. As of 2023 NIF also funded the nonprofit organizations Tzedek Centers and FakeReporter.

=== Israel-US civil liberties law program ===
The New Israel Fund has trained more than 46 Israeli lawyers over the course of 20 years in human rights law. The lawyers are provided with the opportunity to get an LL.M. degree at the American University Washington College of Law specializing in human rights law. Graduates of the program have successfully argued cases in Israel around social justice, for environmental protections, to curb police brutality, and against discrimination.

=== New Initiatives for Democracy ===
In September 2014, the New Israel Fund announced a new initiative, New Initiatives for Democracy (NIF-D), that will provide for the seed-funding, partnering and incubation of new programs to construct the missing architecture for the progressive movement in Israel, as well as building bridges to non-progressive constituencies who share values and interests. Initial funding stood at more than $2 million in 2014, granted or seed-funded to eight new initiatives, from think tanks to media monitoring to online engagement and leadership training.

=== Gender segregation and women's rights ===
In 1994, a pair of NIF grantees successfully petitioned the Israeli High Court of Justice to force the Israeli military to stop discriminating on the basis of gender when it came to allowing women to qualify for flight training. The decision, known as the Alice Miller case, opened the door for women to serve in many combat roles within the Israeli army.

In January 2011, the Supreme Court of Israel ruled that publicly funded buses cannot enforce a policy of gender segregation. IRAC, a grantee of NIF, initiated the legal efforts to integrate the bus lines. NIF-backed efforts against gender segregation in public spaces included a Chanukah candle-lighting to protest gender segregation at the Western Wall Plaza.

In late 2011, in response the disappearance of the images of women from advertisements in Jerusalem because of Haredi pressure, NIF launched the "Women Should be Seen and Heard" campaign. In winter 2012, NIF convened "30 social justice organizations" who put pressure on organizers of a fertility and gynecology conference from which women were banned from speaking, and that "nine out of ten Israeli doctors scheduled to speak had withdrawn".

NIF also supports Women of the Wall, which fights for egalitarian prayer at the Western Wall, Judaism's second holiest site after the temple mount.

=== Social justice protests ===
In the summer of 2011, as hundreds of thousands of Israelis protested for social justice, NIF reportedly raised $35,000 on behalf of the demonstrators. The NIF praised the protests as an autonomous, grassroots movement. It said its own participation was limited in scope, which included providing tens of thousands of dollars in small grants to activist groups. It also acknowledged other activities, including "mapping the initiatives, which were initiated by Shatil and the New Israel Fund" and in terms of providing advice to the protesters and providing funding for the tent cities in the periphery.

NIF also organized a petition signed by nearly 4,000 people in support of the protesters. The petition was published in the Israeli edition of the International Herald Tribune.

=== Torture ban ===
In 1999, the Supreme Court of Israel ruled that the Israel Security Agency, also known as Shin Bet, could no longer use various means of physical torture in its interrogations. The matter was brought to the court by three NIF grantees: Public Committee Against Torture in Israel, HaMoked, and Association for Civil Rights in Israel. The decision by Chief Justice Aharon Barak concluded "A democratic, freedom loving society does not accept that investigators use any means for the purpose of uncovering the truth." Eitan Felner, executive director of B'Tselem said that "The importance of this decision is that it says that certain ends, even crucial ones like fighting random violence against civilians, can't justify every means."

However, some of the groups who brought the case to the court say that some forms of torture continue to be practiced.

== Reception ==
=== Ford Foundation funding ===
In 2003 and 2008, the Ford Foundation provided five-year grants worth $20 million each to NGOs in Israel through the New Israel Fund. The foundation was the focus of criticism because most of its donees are liberal. The foundation adopted new, stricter funding guidelines after the World Conference against Racism in Durban in 2001. At the beginning of the second five-year grant, the Ford Foundation said it would not renew its grants to Israeli NGOs, which had provided roughly one-third of the New Israel Fund's donor-advised giving, citing its policy of creating sustainable funding, which is also being applied to much of its NGO funding worldwide.

=== Im Tirtzu ===
In January 2010, the right-wing organization Im Tirtzu placed newspaper advertisements depicting then-NIF President Naomi Chazan with a horn sprouting from her forehead (as a pun, since both the words "horn" and "fund" use the same Hebrew word "Keren") as part of a campaign accusing NIF of responsibility for the Goldstone Report. Im Tirtzu alleged that 92% of all Israel-based negative reporting in the Goldstone report came from NIF-supported groups.

Im Tirtzu's campaign drew criticism. Abe Foxman, head of the Anti-Defamation League said that it was "absurd to blame Goldstone on the NIF." Gershon Baskin, writing in The Jerusalem Post, accused Im Tirtzu of using an "anti-Semitic motif" as part of a "witch-hunt" that "is reminiscent of the darkest days of McCarthyism". According to the Jewish Telegraphic Agency (JTA) Im Tirtzu's report said 16 NIF affiliated groups comprised 14 percent of all sources for the Goldstone report, while stating in a separate section that these constitute 92 percent of Israel-based negative reporting in the Goldstone report; some reporting had incorrectly confused the two separate figures and accused Im Tirzu as being inaccurate.

NIF estimated that 1.3% of the citations in the UN report originated from reports by organizations supported by the New Israel Fund.

Chemi Shalev, writing for Haaretz, defended the NIF, writing "one cannot really overstate what an utter travesty this fanatic jihad against the NIF was".

=== Birthright ===
In November 2014 Birthright Israel cancelled a planned trip the two groups had been collaborating on. According to Stephanie Ives, the NIF's New York director, Birthright had provided three reasons: Birthright said the NIF had violated its marketing guidelines, Birthright said it does not work with organizations that seek to influence Israeli policy, and Birthright was cancelling several trips from the New York area.

=== Benjamin Netanyahu ===
In April 2018 Israeli Prime Minister Benjamin Netanyahu blamed the New Israel Fund for undermining an agreement he said he had reached with the government of Rwanda to have that country accept migrants deported from Israel. The Rwandan government denied that such an agreement ever existed. NIF also denied Netanyahu's allegation, although it was later reported that five NIF grantees, along with other local and international human rights and refugees welfare organizations, wrote an open letter to Rwandan President Paul Kagame asking him not to accept the deal.

The organization's CEO said that NIF "did support massive numbers of Israelis standing up for what is right and demanding action from their own government." Former U.S. Ambassador to Israel Martin Indyk termed Netanyahu's statements as "Bibiesque/Trump-style deflection" and said that "Israelis are smarter than to believe such hogwash."
