= Avi Gil =

Israeli diplomat (born 1955)

- אבי גיל
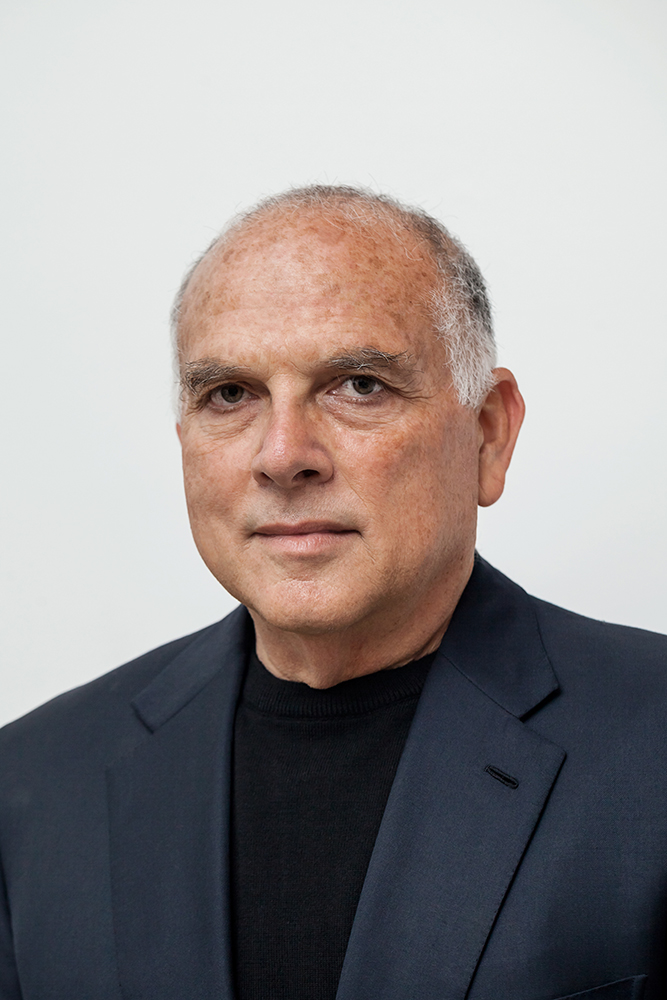
- Avi Gil
- Born: January 11, 1955 (age 71); Haifa, Israel
- Education: Hebrew University of Jerusalem, Harvard Kennedy School
- Occupations: Strategic advisor, former diplomat
- Notable work: Shimon Peres: an insider's account of the man and the struggle for a New Middle East

Avi Gil (Hebrew: אבי גיל; born January 11, 1955) is a former Israeli diplomat who served as director general of The Israel Ministry of Foreign Affairs. Since 2003 he as a Senior Fellow at the Jewish People Policy Institute (JPPI).

== Biography ==
Gil served as director general of The Israel Ministry of Foreign Affairs (2001–2002), the Prime Minister's Chief of Staff (1995–1996), Director-General of the Ministry of Regional Cooperation (1999-2001) (He).

Gil has been closely involved in Israel's policy-making and peace efforts, including the negotiations that led to the Oslo Accords. His book: "Shimon Peres, An Insider’s Account of the Man and the Struggle for a New Middle East" has been published by I.B. Tauris (November 2020).

Gil served as Director of Content of the five Israeli Presidential Conferences “Facing Tomorrow” (2009-2014). He has also been the content director of the Global Forum of the National Library of Israel since its inception in 2014.

Gil holds master degrees from The Hebrew University of Jerusalem (Political Science) and from Harvard Kennedy School (Public Administration).

== Publications ==
Avi Gil, Shimon Peres: an insider's account of the man and the struggle for a New Middle East, London: I.B. Tauris, 2020

=== Selected articles ===
- Will Biden save the two-state solution? Al-Monitor, 26 Novembre 2020
- Trump’s defeat ends the Israeli right’s long celebration, The Times of Israel, November 10, 2020
- No substitute for Oslo and the ‘new Middle East’, The Jerusalem Post, October 28, 2020
- The Geopolitical Arena in the Shadow of the COVID-19 Pandemic, JPPI, September 2, 2020
- The Evolving World Order: Implications for Israel and the Jewish People, JPPI, April 16, 2019
- Will Netanyahu Surrender to the Annexation Camp? Haaretz, February 16, 2018
- How Americans Enable Israel's 'Jewish or Democratic State' Delusion, Forward, February 7, 2016
- The downside of Blinken’s encouraging confirmation hearing, Jerusalem Post, January 25, 2021
- President Biden, restoring world order and its impact on Israel, Jerusalem Post, February 16, 2021
- To escape endless elections, Israel needs a new generation of ‘naïve’ leaders, The Forward, March 8, 2021
