= Khalwa (structure) =

Small prayer space or mosque in Islamic tradition

A khalwa (also "bayt al-khalwa", literally "place of seclusion"), is an Islamic solitary space or cell (zawiya) set aside as a place for retreat and spiritual exercise.

A considerable number of small khalwa structures were built on the esplanade of Al-Aqsa from 956 onwards, many founded by local Ottoman dignitaries and echoing a similar vaulted form supporting one or two domed chambers.

The underground prayer chambers in the traditional mosques of central Arabia (Najd) are also called khalwa. Druze prayer houses are also known as khalwas, Khalwat al-Bayada being the most prominent one.
