= Hostage (disambiguation) =

A hostage is a person or entity held by a captor.

Hostage or The Hostage may also refer to:

== Film ==
- The Hostage (1917 film), a 1917 American silent drama film
- The Hostage (1956 film), a 1956 British crime film
- The Hostage (1967 film), a 1967 American low-budget film starring Don O'Kelly
- The Hostage (1998 film), 1998 film with Ted Prior
- Hostage (1974 film), a 1974 Iranian film starring Reza Beyk Imanverdi and Nematollah Gorji
- Hostage (1983 film), a 1983 Australian film based on the true story of Christine Maresch
- Hostage (1988 film), a 1988 American made-for-TV film starring Carol Burnett
- Hostage (1992 film), a 1992 British-Argentinian film starring Sam Neill and James Fox
- Hostage (2005 film), a 2005 American thriller starring Bruce Willis
- Hostage (2014 film), a 2014 Czech-Slovak co-production directed by Juraj Nvota

== Literature ==
- Hostage (novel), a novel by Robert Crais, basis for the 2005 film
- The Hostage (play), a 1958 play by Brendan Behan
- The Hostage (1959 novel), a 1959 novel by Henry Farrell, basis for the 1967 film
- "The Hostage", a short story by C. S. Forester
- "The Hostage" (ballad), a 1798 ballad by Friedrich Schiller
- The Hostage (novel), a 1984 novel by Zayd Mutee' Dammaj
- Hostage (memoir), a 2025 memoir by Eli Sharabi
- Hostage, a novel by Elie Wiesel

== Music ==
=== Albums ===
- Hostage (Charles Bukowski album), 1994
- Hostage (Rez Band album), 1984

=== Songs ===
- "Hostage" (Billie Eilish song), 2017
- "Hostage" (Latto song), 2026
- "The Hostage" (song), a 1974 song by Donna Summer
- "Hostage", by Almah from Unfold
- "Hostage", by Chelsea Grin from Eternal Nightmare
- "Hostage", by Hilary McRae from Through These Walls
- "Hostage", by Mike Oldfield from Earth Moving
- "Hostage", by Queensrÿche from Operation: Mindcrime II
- "Hostage", by Sia Furler from 1000 Forms of Fear
- "The Hostage", a song by Tom Paxton, recorded by Judy Collins on the album True Stories and Other Dreams

== People ==
- Gilmary M. Hostage III (born 1955), United States Air Force general

== Television ==
- Hostage (TV series), a 2025 series starring Julie Delpy and Suranne Jones
- "Hostage" (The Bill), a 1985 television episode
- "Hostage" (The Detectives), a 1993 television episode
- "Hostage" (Patience), a 2026 television episode
- "Hostage" (Year of the Rabbit), a 2019 television episode
- "The Hostage" (Citizen Smith), a 1977 television episode
- "Hostage" a 2008 television episode of CSI: NY season 4
- "The Hostage", a 1985 television episode of Up the Elephant and Round the Castle

== See also ==
- Hostages (disambiguation)
