= October 7 bomb shelter massacres =

Fortified shelters in southern Israel

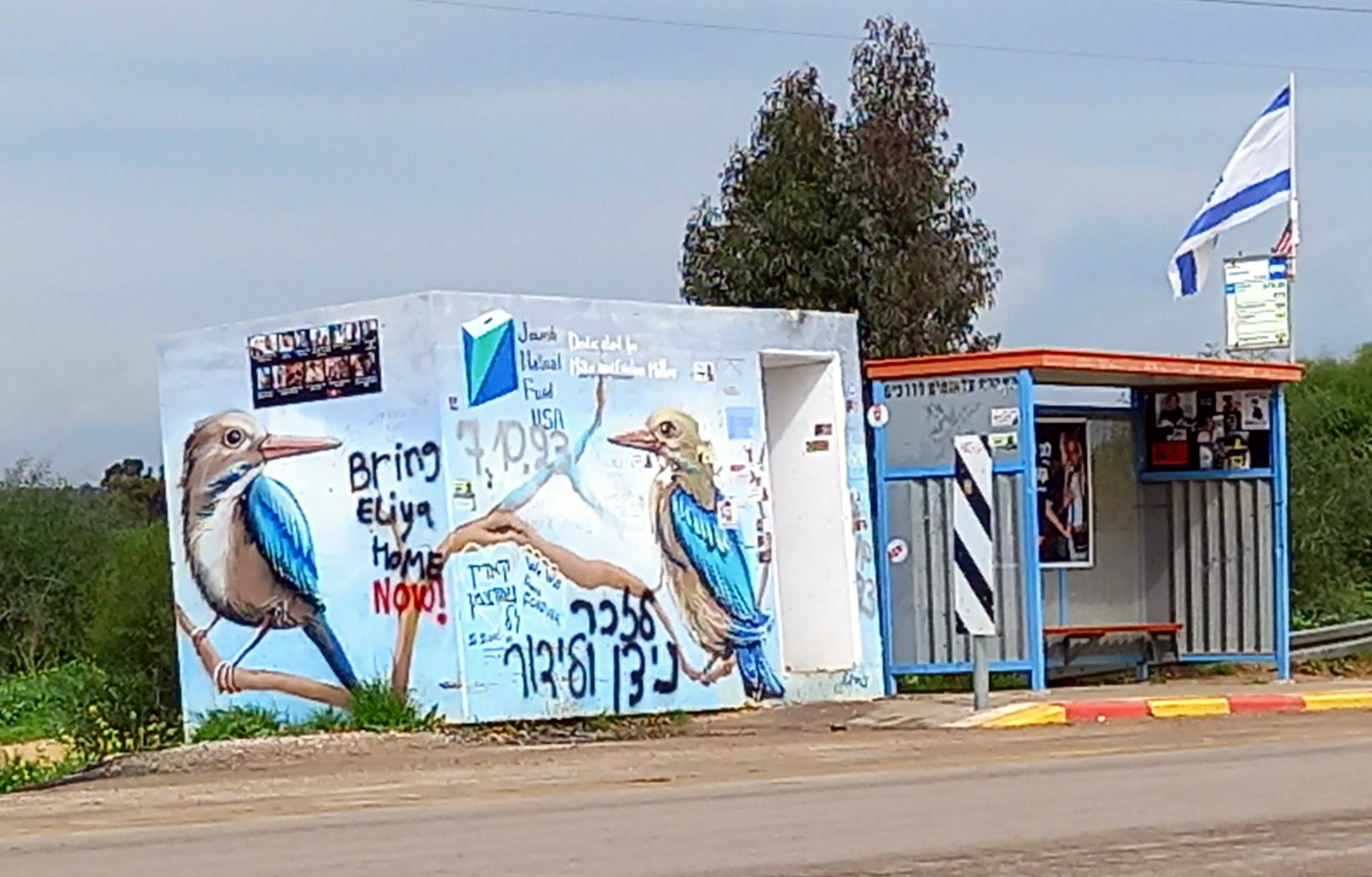
"Death Shelter" near Kibbutz Re'im

The Bomb shelter massacres on October 7, 2023 took place when dozens of young Israelis were killed or taken hostage while fleeing the Nova music festival massacre to the bomb shelters or "protected spaces" (Hebrew: מרחבים מוגנים, romanized: merkhavim muganim) nearby.

== Background ==
As part of the surprise attack on Israel on October 7, 2023, fighters who Israeli sources describe as Hamas' Nukhba forces arrived at a music festival called "Nova Festival," which took place in a forest near Re'im on the night between October 6 and 7, 2023. Hamas forces raided the festival, killing 364 civilians and injuring hundreds of others. Additionally, 44 individuals were kidnapped by Hamas forces and other organizations to the Gaza Strip, some of whom were later released as part of a hostage exchange and "Operation Arnon." During the massacre, the militants also committed sexual assaults and rapes. This was the largest terrorist attack in Israel's history.

For several decades, Israeli law has mandated shelters, known individually as Merkhav Mugan (Hebrew: מרחב מוגן). The first security room or shelter was based on a 1951 civil defense law which has gone through several revisions after major events such as being targeted with Scud missiles in the Gulf War. The shelters are reportedly designed to withstand blast and shrapnel from standard weapons, and to offer some protection against chemical and biological weapons.

== Attacks and abductions during 7 October 2023 ==
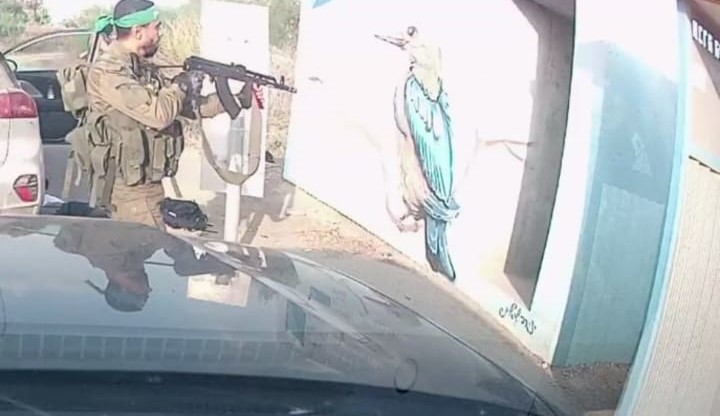
Hamas shooting into bomb shelter near the Nova Festival, October 7, 2023

=== Re'im Junction shelter ===
Upon the arrival of the militants at the scene, about 50 festival-goers fled to the fortified shelter at Re'im Junction, where they sought refuge, including Aner Shapira and Hersh Goldberg-Polin. According to survivors' testimonies, Shapira was the last to enter the shelter. When Hamas militants reached the shelter, Shapira armed himself with a broken bottle and stood at the entrance to fight off the attackers. One of the militants began throwing grenades one by one through the entrance of the shelter, aiming to harm those inside. Shapira, who stood close to the shelter's entrance, intercepted the grenades and threw them back out, away from the shelter. After blocking seven grenades this way, the eighth grenade exploded in his hand, killing him. Hamas assailants fired a rocket-propelled grenade at the entrance of the shelter.

Subsequently, Hamas forces and other organizations entered the shelter and violently dragged out the young survivors, some of whom were injured to varying degrees, and loaded them onto trucks to be kidnapped to the Gaza Strip. Among the kidnapped was Hersh Goldberg-Polin, who lost his hand. Several survivors played dead for hours to avoid being kidnapped or killed.

=== Alumim Junction shelter ===
Some festival participants fled to Alumim Junction, where they hid in the fortified shelter at the junction. The militants reached the shelter and killed most of those inside. Noam Cohen, one of the survivors of the massacre, published "Noam's Song 2," documenting the moments of terror in the shelter, and later in a musical single with Maor Ashkenazi.

=== Be'eri shelter ===
Israeli singer Yuval Raphael was injured but survived the attack on a shelter outside Kibbutz Be'eri. According to her, of the 51 people in the shelter, 40 were killed that day. After winning the eleventh season of the singing competition HaKokhav HaBa, she represented Israel in the Eurovision Song Contest 2025 with the song "New Day Will Rise", finishing in second place overall with 357 points and winning the televote.

== Aftermath ==
On June 24, 2024, the Headquarters for the Return of the Hostages and Missing Persons released a video documenting the kidnapping of Hersh Goldberg-Polin, Or Levi, and Elia Cohen from the shelter. The Israel National Roads Company was criticized for repainting the interior of the shelter, thereby covering up evidence of the violence and bloodshed that took place there.

== Bibliography ==
- Penkower, Monty Noam (2025). Awakening to Radical Islamist Evil: The Hamas War Against Israel and the Jews (1st ed.). La Vergne: Touro University Press. ISBN 979-8-88719-772-2.
