= Kidnapping of Alon Ohel =

2023–2025 kidnapping of Israeli-Serbian pianist by Hamas

Alon Ohel אלון אהל
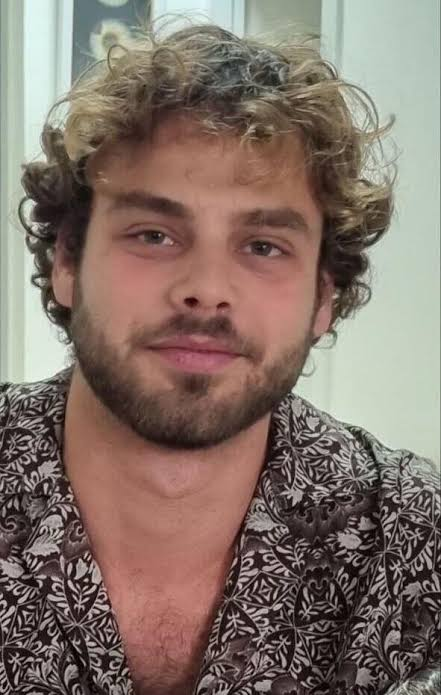

Background information
- Born: February 10, 2001 (age 25); Lavon, Israel
- Origin: Israel, Serbia
- Occupation: Pianist
- Instrument: Piano

On 7 October 2023, Alon Ohel (Hebrew: אלון אהל; Serbian: Алон Охел; born 10 February 2001), an Israeli-Serbian pianist, was abducted by Hamas during the Nova music festival massacre. He was held hostage in the Gaza Strip for two years, until his release on 13 October 2025 as part of the Gaza peace plan.

== Early life ==
Ohel was born in 2001 to Idit and Yaakov (Kobi) Ohel and grew up in Lavon in the Upper Galilee. He began playing the piano at the age of nine and studied music in high school. Influenced by both classical music and jazz, he performed a recital at the end of his studies and often took part in jam sessions and improvisations. He planned to continue his musical studies at the Rimon School of Music in October 2023 after returning from a trip to Asia, and to move to Tel Aviv, but those plans were cut short by the October 7 attacks and his subsequent abduction.

Ohel has a brother and a sister. His family lives in Lavon. He is reportedly a citizen of Serbia and Israel.

== Kidnapping ==
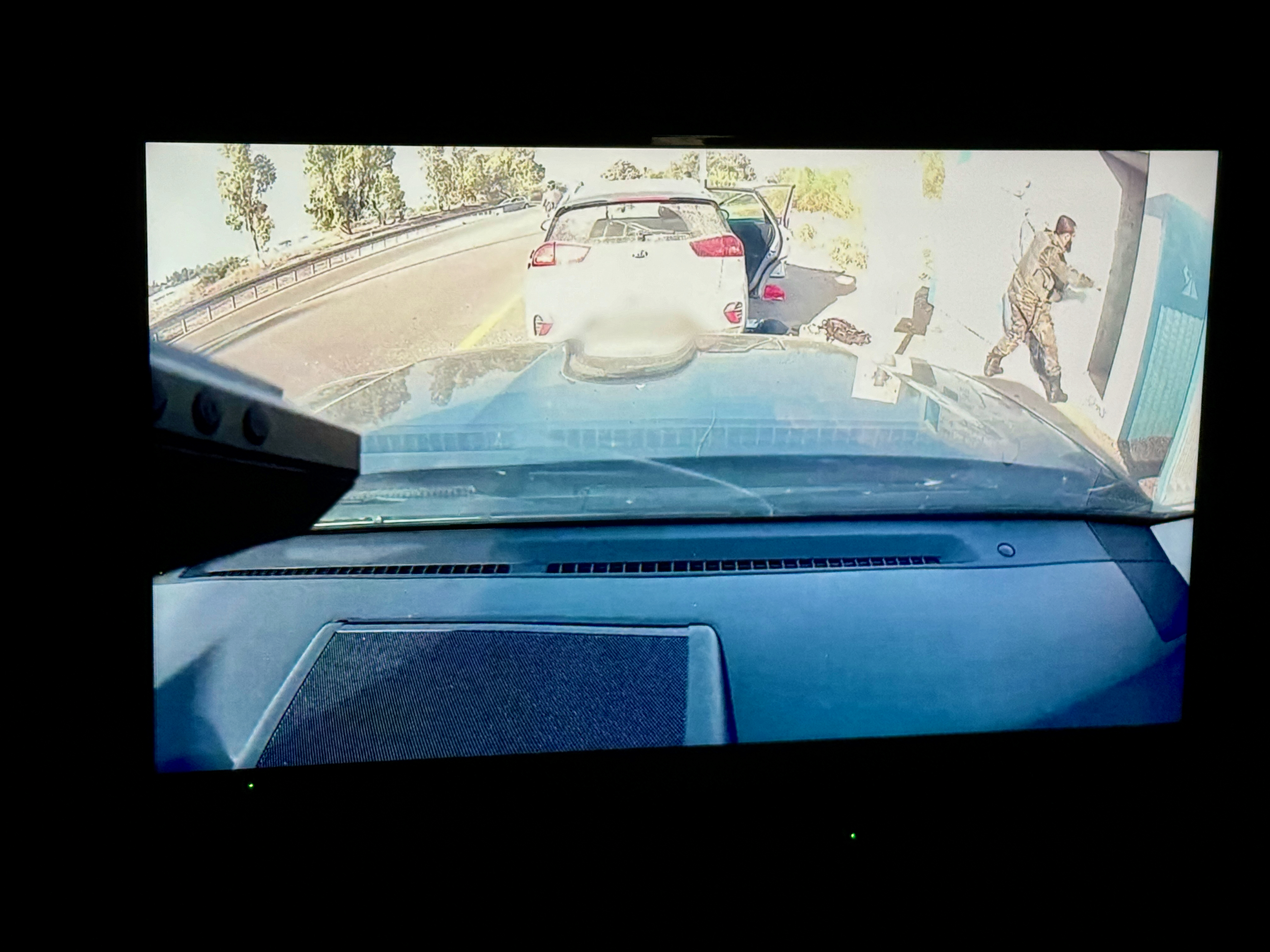
Still of video showing Hamas militant about to enter shelter that Ohel and others were sheltering in during the attack.

On the morning of 7 October 2023, Ohel attended the Nova music festival near Re'im, when Hamas launched the October 7 attacks on Israel. During the attack, he and 26 others took refuge in what later became known as the "Death Shelter" at the Re'im junction. After prolonged fighting by the festival-goers, Hamas gunmen entered the shelter and abducted Ohel along with Hersh Goldberg-Polin, Or Levy and Elia Cohen, all of whom were wounded to varying degrees.

According to testimonies from released hostages, including Eli Sharabi and Elia Cohen, Ohel was injured during the attack by shrapnel that struck his eye, causing the loss of vision in one eye and possible severe damage to the other.

== Captivity ==
Following the release of fellow hostage Or Levi in February 2025, Ohel's family received the first proof of life from him, confirming that he remained in captivity. Levi testified that Ohel was chained by his legs, severely malnourished, and suffering from untreated injuries, including near-blindness. In April 2025, his family claimed that a 19-year-old had stitched his wounds without anesthesia and then given acetaminophen.

Ohel later recounted that fellow hostage Eli Sharabi gave him emotional and physical support during their time in captivity stating that Sharabi let him fall apart and then told him "It’s okay to break down, but we must never lose hope." He also recounted being chained together with Sharabi and played either backgammon or cards to help pass the time.

On 5 September 2025, a video released by Hamas showed Ohel for the first time since his abduction, alongside Guy Gilboa-Dalal, appealing for his release. The video had been filmed in August 2025 and reportedly after filming letters from Ohel and Gilboa-Dalal were handed over the Red Cross. After his release Ohel stated that he had been mostly chained in a single tunnel while held as a captive, until being moved to a central part of Gaza about 40 days before his release. He also stated that Hamas militants had used him as a human shield and moved into combat areas after the Israel Defense Forces offensive into Gaza City began.

== Efforts to release ==
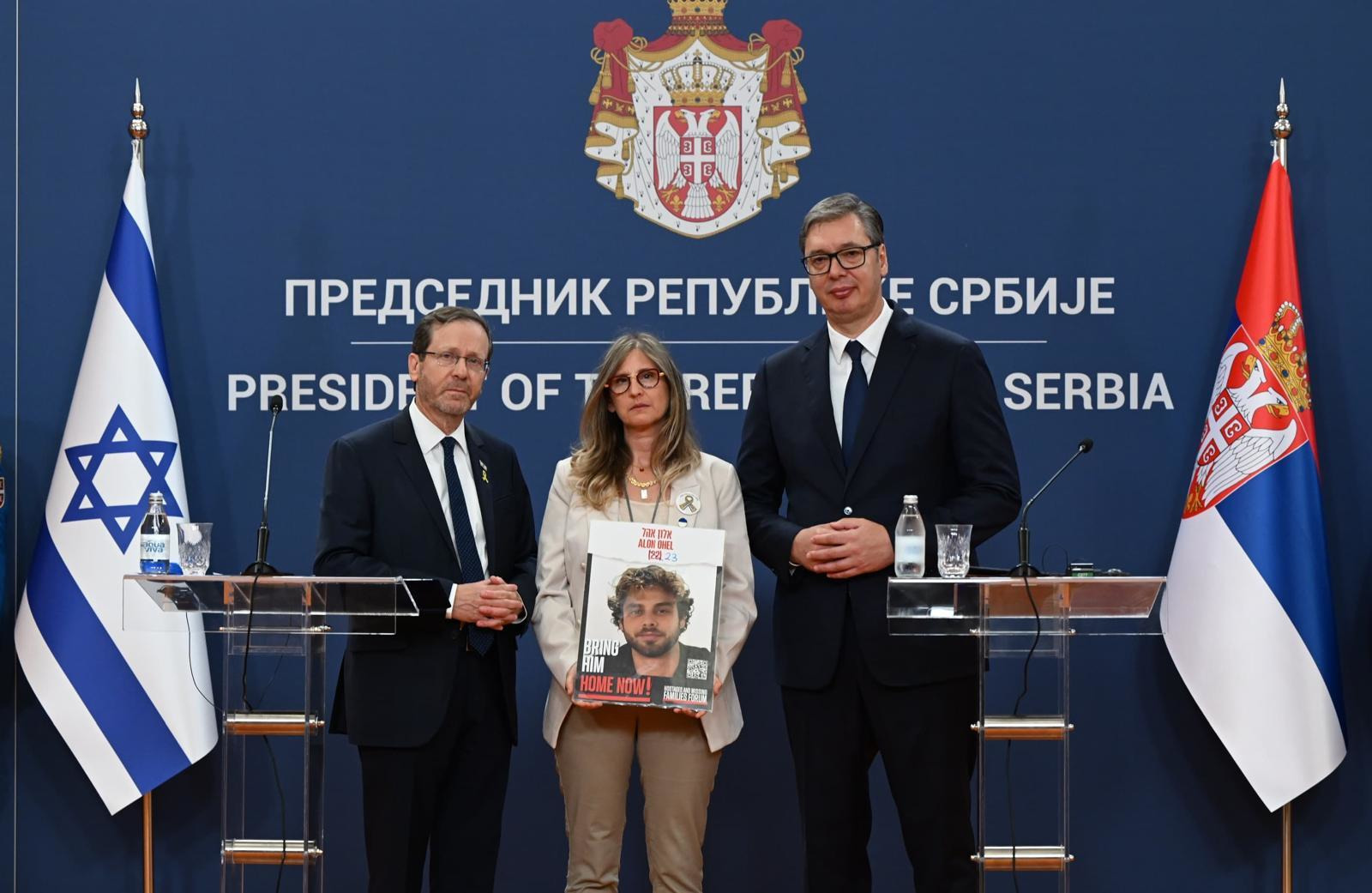
President of Israel, Isaac Herzog, President of Serbia, Aleksandar Vučić, and Idit Ohel with the picture of Alon on 11 September 2024

After the abduction, the slogan "Alon You Are Not Alone" spread widely and was inscribed on pianos across Israel and abroad. His family placed his piano at the Hostages Square in Tel Aviv as part of the campaign by the Hostages and Missing Families Forum. The project later expanded to around 30 "yellow pianos" worldwide, dedicated to raising awareness of the hostages' plight.

His brother initiated a new recording of the song "Shuvi Eli" with Israeli musician Avishai Cohen in his honor. On his 24th birthday in February 2025, thousands gathered in Hostages Square to mark his second birthday in captivity, attended by musicians such as Ivri Lider and public figures calling for his release. His mother spoke with Prime Minister Benjamin Netanyahu and later stated that she told Netanyahu that Ohel's fate was his responsibility and that during the conversation she spoke and Netanyahu listened. In April 2025, John Ondrasik released a new edition of his song Superman (It's Not Easy) dedicated to Ohel.

In April 2025, his family spoke about Ohel's condition and suggested a proposal of evacuating all injured hostages to a neutral country for treatment at Hostages Square. Their proposal was reportedly given to Netanyahu's close associates, Israeli hostage envoy and Shin Bet representatives along with senior US envoys Adam Boehler and Steve Witkoff. His family also expressed their outrage about any humanitarian aid being allowed into Gaza, repeating prior allegations from the Israeli government that allegedly the aid was going to Hamas and that injured hostages are being left untreated.

In September 2025, after the release of the Hamas video showing Ohel, German Chancellor Friedrich Merz posted about the video on social media calling it "dehumanizing footage" and called for the release of all hostages and a ceasefire.

== Release ==
On 13 October 2025, after 737 days in captivity, Ohel was released from Gaza as part of the United States-brokered Gaza peace plan between Israel and Hamas, mediated by Qatar and Egypt. His release was widely covered in Israeli and international media, with public celebrations across Israel, particularly at Hostages Square in Tel Aviv, where yellow pianos were played in his honor. He was discharged from Rabin Medical Center on 24 October. During the ride to his home, crowds gathered at Mitzpheh Aviv junction and at Misgav Regional Council to see his motorcade go by. Upon arrival at his home, he thanked his supporters, stating that he was incredibly happy to see all the love and well wishes.

=== Post release activities ===
In November 2025, it was announced that Ohel had undergone two surgeries at Beilinson Hospital to treat his shoulder and eye that were both damaged during the attack and had deteriorated during the captivity. Although assessments of photos released during his captivity had predicted that he had lost all vision in his injured eye, Israeli doctors stated that they were hopeful in being able to restore part of his vision in the eye.

Also in November 2025, Ohel was a musical guest on Israeli sketch comedy show Eretz Nehederet as follow up to the performance earlier in the year by Israeli singer Hanan Ben Ari that was dedicated to Ohel and was part of a national recognition of hostages campaign.

In February 2026, Ohel produced and was a participant in a fundraising concert on behalf of a rehabilitation fund for Ohel. During the concert Ohel performed "Yesh Li Sikui" (I Have a Chance) by Eviatar Banai and dedicated it to fellow hostage Eli Sharabi who had been held with Ohel and was in attendance. He credited Sharabi as helping him survive captivity as Sharabi had helped him cope and occupy time in captivity.

== See also ==
- List of Gaza war hostages
