= Eliya Cohen (hostage) =

Israeli hostage taken by Hamas in 2023

- Part of the Gaza war hostage crisis
- Location: near Re'im, Israel
- Date: 7 October 2023 (kidnapping) – 13 October 2025 (release); 738 days held hostage
- Attack type: kidnapping, hostage taking
- Perpetrator: Hamas

Eliya Cohen (Hebrew: אלי-ה כהן; born April 24, 1997) is an Israeli civilian who was kidnapped by Hamas militants and taken to the Gaza Strip during the Nova music festival massacre near Re'im on October 7, 2023.

Cohen was released on February 22, 2025, after 505 days in Hamas captivity, as part of a Gaza ceasefire and hostage exchange agreement.

After his release, Cohen published the autobiography Mufawadat (Arabic: "Negotiation"), describing his experiences in captivity. The book was translated to English and received a Platinum Book award.

== Early life ==
Eliya Cohen was born on 24 April 1997 in Beit Shemesh, Israel, to Sigi and Momi Cohen. He is the eldest of four children and has three younger sisters. The family later moved to Tzur Hadassah. Cohen was raised in a Jewish, religious household, but became secular as a teen.

Before his abduction, Cohen lived with his girlfriend, Ziv Abud, in a small living unit at Abud's parents' house in Tel Aviv. He was studying at Tel Aviv University, and worked as an Airbnb property manager and a Trance music party producer. Cohen and Abud had a dog named Chapou. Cohen bought an engagement ring and was planning to propose to Abud.

== Abduction ==
On October 7, 2023, Cohen, Abud, her nephew Amit Ben Avida, and Ben Avida's partner Karin Schwartzman were attending the Nova music festival near Kibbutz Re'im. Following Hamas' large-scale surprise attack on Israel, as rocket fire began and hundreds of militants overran the site and began attacking fleeing participants, the four fled to the roadside bomb shelter near Re'im.

When Hamas militants began throwing grenades into the shelter, now referred to as "the death bunker" or "The shelter of death", they tried to hide beneath the bodies of victims. Ben Avida and Schwartzman were killed. Cohen was shot in the leg before being abducted in a pickup truck together with Hersh Goldberg-Polin, Or Levy and another Israeli, who was reportedly killed after attempting to jump from the vehicle before it crossed into Gaza.

Before he was abducted, Cohen saw that Abud lost consciousness and believed she was killed. He only learned that she survived after his release from captivity.

Cohen's abduction was filmed by Hamas militants and widely circulated on social media, together with footage showing him in a hospital in Gaza later that day. The Israel Defense Forces officially confirmed his abduction three days later.

== Captivity ==
After arriving in Gaza, Cohen underwent the removal of the bullet from his leg by a local doctor using tweezers without anesthesia. According to Cohen, he was instructed not to make any noise during the procedure so that the location where he was being held would not be discovered.

He was initially held in an apartment with Alon Ohel and Or Levy. During the first hostage exchange in November 2023, they were moved into Hamas tunnels, where he met Eli Sharabi, Hersh Goldberg-Polin, Almog Sarusi and Uri Danino. Several days later, Goldberg-Polin, Sarusi and Danino were taken to another tunnel, while the remaining hostages were falsely told they had been released to Israel as part of what Cohen later described as psychological warfare.

During his captivity, the only indication that Cohen was still alive came after the release of Eli Sharabi and Or Levy, who informed his family about the conditions in which he was being held. They said that Cohen was chained since he was kidnapped, receives little food and is disconnected from the outside world. Cohen confirmed that he and the other hostages had very limited access to news, and only learned shortly before his own release that Goldberg-Polin, Sarusi and Danino had been killed in Rafah.

According to Cohen, he endured deliberate starvation, torture, and poor sanitary conditions. Cohen said “For eight months, we slept on the floor … I dislocated my shoulder countless times. We were weak”. He also noted "On the day we arrive in the tunnel, we immediately encountered the chains. They were tied very tightly; they cut into your legs. You go to the bathroom and it takes you ten minutes. You say to yourself, 'Man, I'm actually wearing chains. I'm like a monkey.'" The restraints were removed only when the hostages were allowed to shower, approximately once every two months.

Several weeks after they were transferred to another tunnel, the location was struck during an Israeli military operation, forcing the hostages to escape through a concealed shaft hidden inside an electrical cabinet at a school. They were subsequently moved to an abandoned Hamas tunnel that lacked running water and electricity and was illuminated only by a portable flashlight.

After his release, Cohen recalled an attempted escape after his guards fled during Israeli airstrikes, when he and other hostages briefly escaped before being captured again by a local Gazan that recognised them as Jews.

Following the signing of the second hostage agreement, Cohen said that his captors removed his leg irons several weeks before his expected release. After Eli Sharabi and Or Levy were released, and Hamas faced criticism over their emaciated appearance, Cohen said that he and Alon Ohel were given significantly more food so they would appear healthier before their planned release. Cohen was said to have gained 8 kilos the week before his release due to forced feeding, whereas in the seven months prior, one pitta was split between four hostages.

== Efforts to release ==
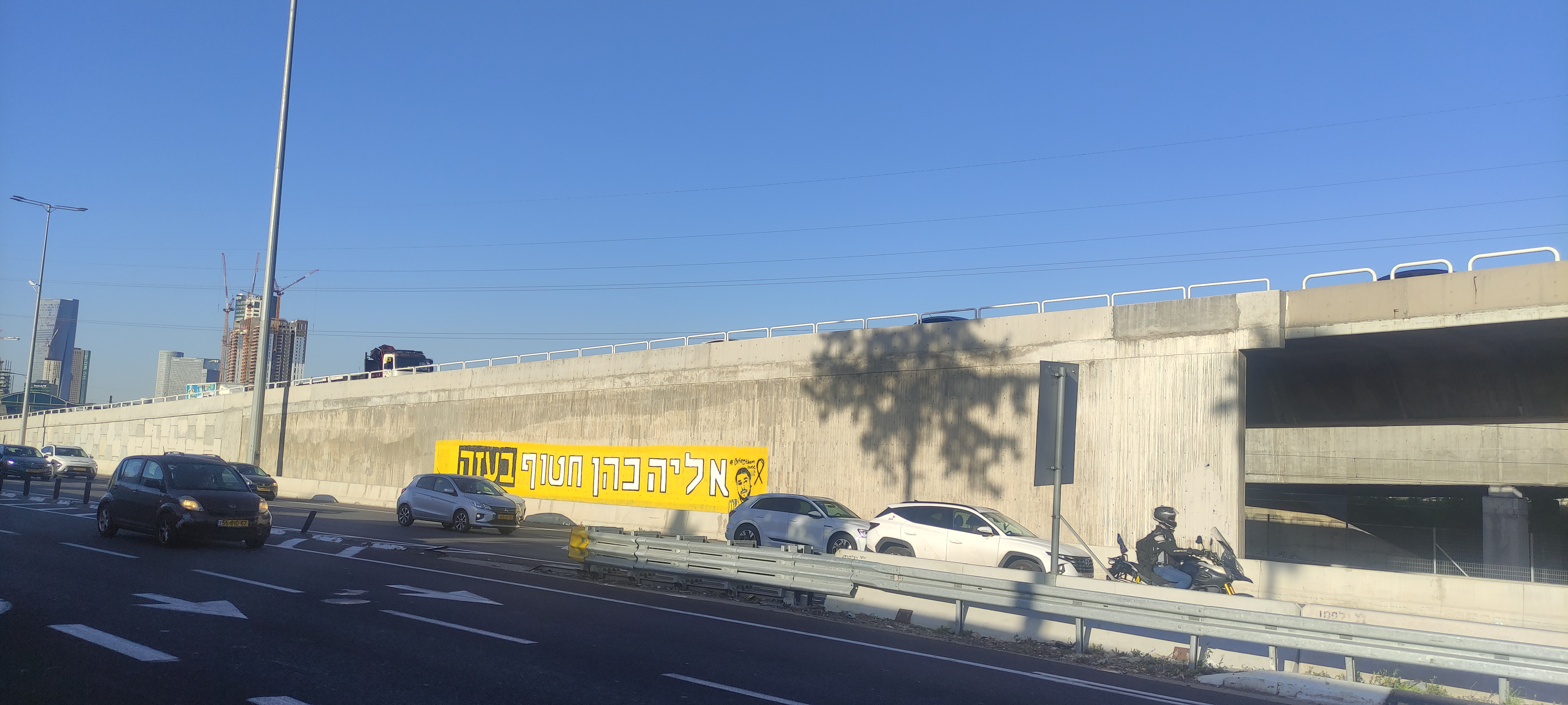
'Eliya Cohen kidnapped in Gaza' graffiti in Tel Aviv

Throughout Cohen's captivity, members of his family and his girlfriend, Abud, participated in demonstrations and international delegations on behalf of the hostages.

In March 2024, during the Purim holiday, Abud walked through the streets of Tel Aviv wearing a yellow dress resembling a wedding gown decorated with iron chains and photographs of hostages. At its center was a bleeding heart displaying Cohen's photograph.

In August 2024, on the eve of Tu B'Av, Abud staged an installation on the Tel Aviv promenade, sitting beside a fully set dinner table next to an empty chair displaying Cohen's photograph. A video documenting the installation, produced with Israeli news outlet N12, received millions of views online.

In June 2024, footage of Cohen's abduction recorded by Hamas militants was released by the Hostages and Missing Families Forum at the request of his family.

== Release ==
On 22 February 2025, after 505 days in captivity, Cohen was released by Hamas as part of a hostage exchange agreement.

According to Cohen, on the night before his release his captors attempted to force him to record a propaganda video stating that he had been treated well during captivity, but he refused.

During the release ceremony, a Hamas militant demanded that Cohen wave to the crowd, and when he refused, the militant raised his hand by force. According to Cohen, only upon returning home he found out that Abud survived and campaigned for his release. Following his release, Cohen spent ten days in Rabin Medical Center.

== Retaliation ==
After Cohen's release, the Israel Defense Forces and Shin Bet announced that airstrike killed Hassan Mahmoud Hassan Hassin, a Hamas al-Bureij Battalion commander who led the Re’im terror attack and participated in the kidnapping of Cohen and other from the "Shelter of death" on October 7 2023.

== Post release activities ==
In August 2025, approximately five months after his release, Cohen published the autobiography Mufawadat (Arabic: "Negotiation"), describing his experiences in captivity. Two months after its publication, the book received a Platinum Book award. It was also translated and published in English.

In late October 2025, Cohen co-produced the Vortex Festival at Shitim together with former hostage Omer Wenkert. The event was dedicated to Amit Ben Avida, the nephew of Cohen's partner Ziv Abud, who was killed during the 7 October attack.

Cohen and Abud spent two months in north America campaigning for the release of the rest of the hostages. In May 2025, Cohen and other released hostages attended the 'Israel Day on Fifth' event, urging the release of the remaining hostages from Gaza. In December 2025, Cohen and Abud met U.S. President Donald Trump at his Mar-a-Lago residence.

Cohen became engaged to Abud in October 2025. They were married on 19 August at Ronit Farm in Israel, with over 1,000 friends and relatives attending. The chuppah (wedding canopy) for their wedding was covered with the tallit (prayer shawl) that belonged to Abud's nephew and the ketubah (marriage contract) was designed and calligraphied by the father of Aner Shapira, establishing the connection to two victims of the October 7 massacre. Amit Ben Avida and Aner Shapira had both been killed in the bus shelter at Re'im Junction where Abud was injured and Cohen was abducted by Hamas.

In April 2026, Cohen went through complex surgery on his foot that was shattered from gunfire shot by Hamas militants into the Shelter of Death in which he was hiding on October 7, 2023.

In September 2026, amid controversy over the documentary NAZA's portrayal of the Israel–Hamas war, Cohen publicly criticized the documentary and its directors, Yuval Abraham and Rachel Szor, saying that the film demeaned the Israeli soldiers who had fought to free him and other hostages.

== See also ==
- List of Gaza war hostages
