= We Will Dance Again =

2024 American documentary film

- Promotional poster
- Directed by: Yariv Mozer
- Written by: Yariv Mozer
- Produced by: Michal Weits
- Cinematography: Shahar Reznik; Nir Maman
- Edited by: Yasmin Novak; Roi Belbirski
- Music by: Tal Yardeni
- Distributed by: Paramount+ (United States); BBC (United Kingdom); Hot 8 (Israel)
- Release date: 24 September 2024 (United States)
- Running time: 90 mins
- Countries: United States; United Kingdom; Israel
- Languages: Hebrew; English

We Will Dance Again is a 2024 documentary film written and directed by Yariv Mozer. It focuses on the Nova music festival massacre and abductions to the Gaza Strip during the Hamas-led attack on Israel, on 7 October 2023. It is an international co-production between the United States (Paramount+), the United Kingdom (BBC) and Israel (Hot).

The film received mostly positive reviews and in 2025 won the News and Documentary Emmy Award for Outstanding Current Affairs Documentary.

== Background ==
On 7 October 2023, the Izz al-Din al-Qassam Brigades, the military wing of the Palestinian nationalist political organization Hamas, initiated a sudden attack on Israel from the Gaza Strip. As part of the attack, 364 individuals, mostly civilian,, were murdered and many more wounded at the Supernova Sukkot Gathering, an open-air music festival during the Jewish holiday of Shemini Atzeret near kibbutz Re'im. Hamas also took 40 people hostage, and men and women were reportedly subject to sexual and gender-based violence.

== Synopsis ==
The film reconstructs the October 7 attack through a series of interviews with survivors of the Nova music festival massacre. Phone videos and footage taken by Hamas is also used to create a timeline of the massacre. The killing of Aner Shapira and the abductions of Hersh Goldberg-Polin and Shani Louk are also told in the film.

The film begins in the evening of 6 October in the Negev Desert, where thousands gather for the music festival. Rockets mistaken for fireworks begin to appear in the sky as the party continues at 6.30 am. Confusion reigns and fear mounts as Hamas arrive at the festival and begin to murder the festival-goers.

== Release ==
In the United States, the film had a two-day theatrical run at select theaters nationwide on 29 August and 1 September. In addition it received a week-long theatrical run in Los Angeles. The film was released by streamer Paramount+ in the United States on 24 September 2024.

Executive producer Susan Zirinsky favored a streaming release over broadcast television: "Ultimately, I thought we could not [run it on CBS] because there's no way possible to break for commercial", continuing "With streaming, you're making a conscious choice to put this on."

In Israel, the film premiered on 25 September on Hot 8. It received its premiere at the National Library of Israel.

In the United Kingdom, the film was broadcast on BBC Two on 26 September 2024, before becoming available for streaming on iPlayer.

The film has also been broadcast in other territories, such as Australia, where it became available for streaming through the Nine Network. The film premiered in Germany on 2 October on the RTL network.

The film has also received a number of special screenings. It received its London premiere at the JW3 Jewish community centre. Emma Barnett, a BBC journalist, hosted a post-screening panel with Mozer and festival survivors, as well as the father of murdered festival-goer, Aner Shapira, whose story is featured in the film.

== Reception ==
Rachel Aroesti gave the film 4 out of 5 stars in her review for The Guardian. Aroesti wrote: "the documentary's focus is very clear: it tells the story of these Israeli citizens – utterly defenceless in the face of Hamas' indiscriminate onslaught – and it does so unflinchingly, exhaustively and movingly."

Ben Kenigsberg reviewed film positively in his New York Times review, praising the lucidity of the interviews and concluding that "if the shock of that day's violence has faded after a year, We Will Dance Again aims to keep it visible, and to memorialize it viscerally."

Rachel Cooke wrote about the film for the New Statesman as an impactful viewing experience: "It will destroy you; sleep was impossible for me afterwards. But it is an astonishing thing, almost beyond description." Cooke added, "It is like the Book of Exodus. Someone says it, but I'm already thinking it."

Film critic Gili Izikovich wrote about the film for Haaretz in Israel: "We're not lacking chilling eyewitness accounts or horrific scenes from October 7. However, what happened at that party is particularly heartbreaking. The celebration of humanity, the emotion that is at the heart of the electronic music festival, the young and beautiful victims, and the chilling violence in which their lives were cut short – all these make for a scene that's hard to withstand." Izikovich continued: "The film We Will Dance Again doesn't spare its viewers in this regard", Izikovich continued. "The trigger warning at the beginning of the film is meant to warn of disturbing images. Those exist in the film, but what is even harder is the dire contrast between a party meant to celebrate freedom, liberty and life, and the scene of the massacre. Between the confusion, disorientation and feelings of abandonment – and the lack of anyone to save them."

Ricardo de Querol wrote about the film for El País in Spain: "It is not an easy experience to endure, nor advisable for sensitive people, but as a historical and journalistic document, it is very valuable."

American actor and director, Sean Penn has spoken in favor of the film: "We bandy about the term 'must-see film', and yet rarely do films live up to that in any literal sense. As heartbreaking as it is revelatory, We Will Dance Again is truly a must-see film in our time."

Film director, actress and singer, Barbra Streisand wrote about the film in an Instagram post, where she described it as "a powerful documentary", continuing, "The stories from survivors of the massacre that day were powerful, heartbreaking and amazing. While it is sometimes painful to watch, it is important to never forget."

=== Awards and nominations ===
Wins

- Outstanding Current Affairs Documentary – News and Documentary Emmy Awards
- Best in Category – Doc Edge
- Best Editing – Doc Edge

Nominations

- Outstanding Editing – Documentary category (Yasmine Novak and Roy Balbirsky) – News and Documentary Emmy Awards
- Outstanding Producer of Documentary Motion Picture – Producers Guild of America
