= Himmelfarb High School =

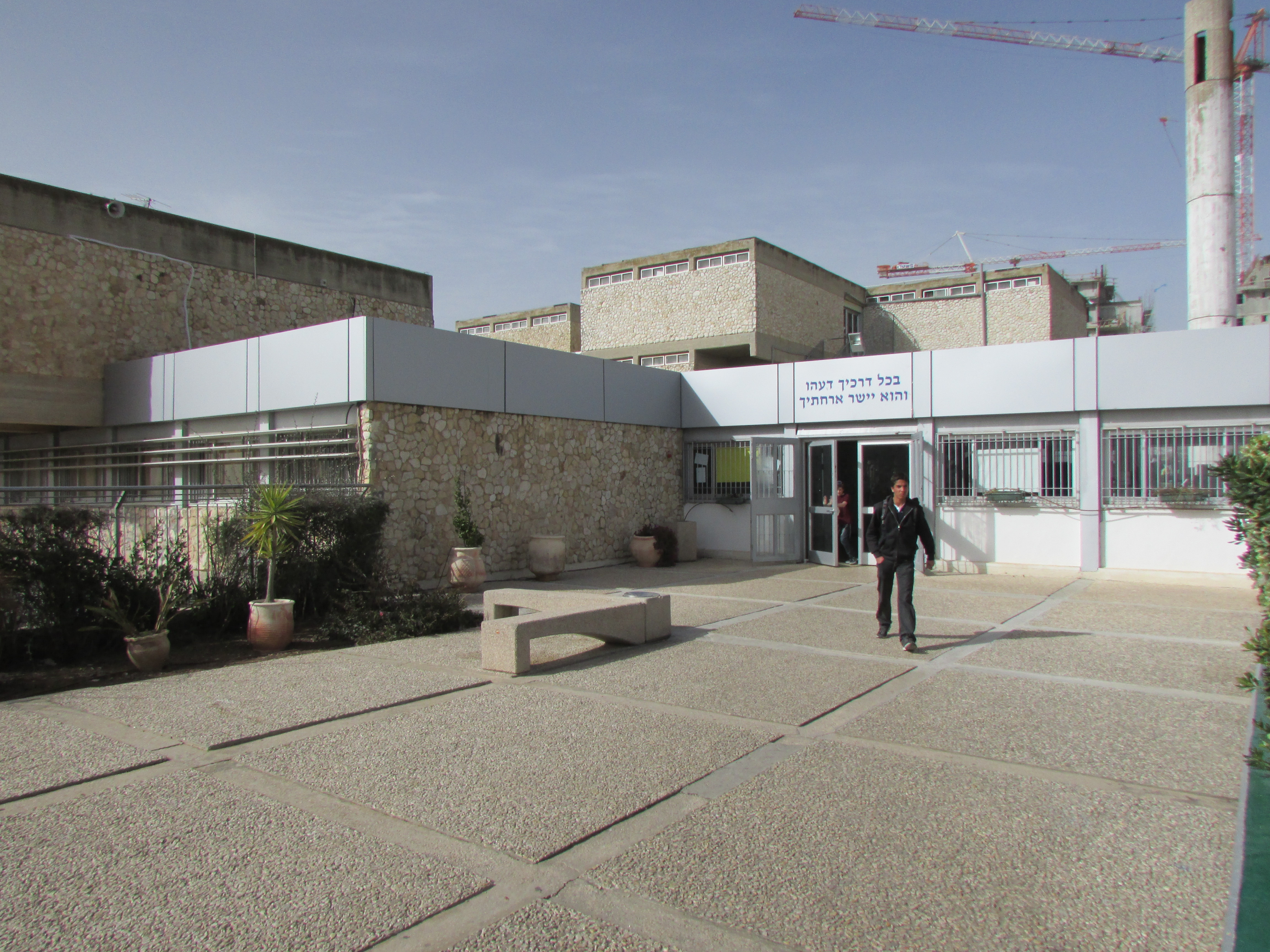
- Himmelfarb High School

Location
- Bayit VeGan, Jerusalem, Israel
- Coordinates: 31.7671°N 35.1811°E

Information
- Religious affiliation: Religious Zionism
- Established: 1920
- Founder: Mizraḥi
- Principal: Rabbi Shlomi Danino
- Gender: Male
- Language: Hebrew
- Website: himmelfarb.tik-tak.net

Himmelfarb High School (Hebrew: תיכון הימלפרב) is a religious Zionist boys' high school located in the Bayit VeGan neighbourhood of Jerusalem. It was founded in 1920 as Mizraḥi High School (תיכון מזרחי) and moved to its current campus in 1968. The school is named after American philanthropist Paul Himmelfarb.

The school is noted for its high matriculation success rate, and for a relatively large percentage of graduates entering combat and officer service in the Israel Defense Forces. During the 2023–2025 Gaza war, ten alumni were killed, including Nova music festival massacre victim Aner Shapira, hostage Hersh Goldberg-Polin, and the school's rabbi, Rabbi Avi Goldberg.

== Notable alumni ==
- Avi Bluth (born 1974), head of the Central Command
- Eyal Gabbai (born 1967), Director General of the Prime Minister's Office
- Hersh Goldberg-Polin (2000–2024), murdered Gaza war hostage
- Herzi Halevi (born 1967), Israel Defense Forces Chief of Staff
- Eli Vakil (born 1953), neuropsychologist
- Elhanan Miller (born 1981), journalist
- Emmanuel Moreno (1971–2006), Lieutenant Colonel killed in the Second Lebanon War
- Noam Nisan (born 1961), computer scientist
- Amit Segal (born 1981), journalist
- Erel Segal (born 1970), journalist
- Aner Shapira (2001–2023), victim of Nova music festival massacre
- Nadav Shragai (born 1959), journalist
- Yonatan Stern (born 1954), entrepreneur

== See also ==
- Education in Israel
