= Hostages (disambiguation) =

Hostages are people seized by a criminal abductor in order to compel another party.

Hostages or The Hostages may also refer to:

== Film ==
- Hostages (1943 film), an American war film directed by Frank Tuttle
- The Hostages (1975 film), a British adventure film directed by David Eady
- Hostages (1992 film), an American drama film directed by David Wheatley
- Hostages (2017 film), a Georgian drama film directed by Rezo Gigineishvili
- The Hostages (1997 film), an American drama film directed by David Wheatley

== Television ==
- Hostages (Israeli TV series), a 2013 drama series, created by Rotem Shamir and Omri Givon
  - Hostages (American TV series), American remake of the series
  - Hostages (Indian TV series), Indian remake of the series
- Hostages (2022 TV series), a 2022 documentary series about the 1979 Iranian revolution

== Other uses ==
- Hostages (video game), a 1988 tactical shooter computer game
- The Hostages (Laurens), an 1896 painting by Jean-Paul Laurens

== See also ==
- Hostage (disambiguation)
