= Eli Sharabi =

Israeli former hostage

- אלי שרעבי
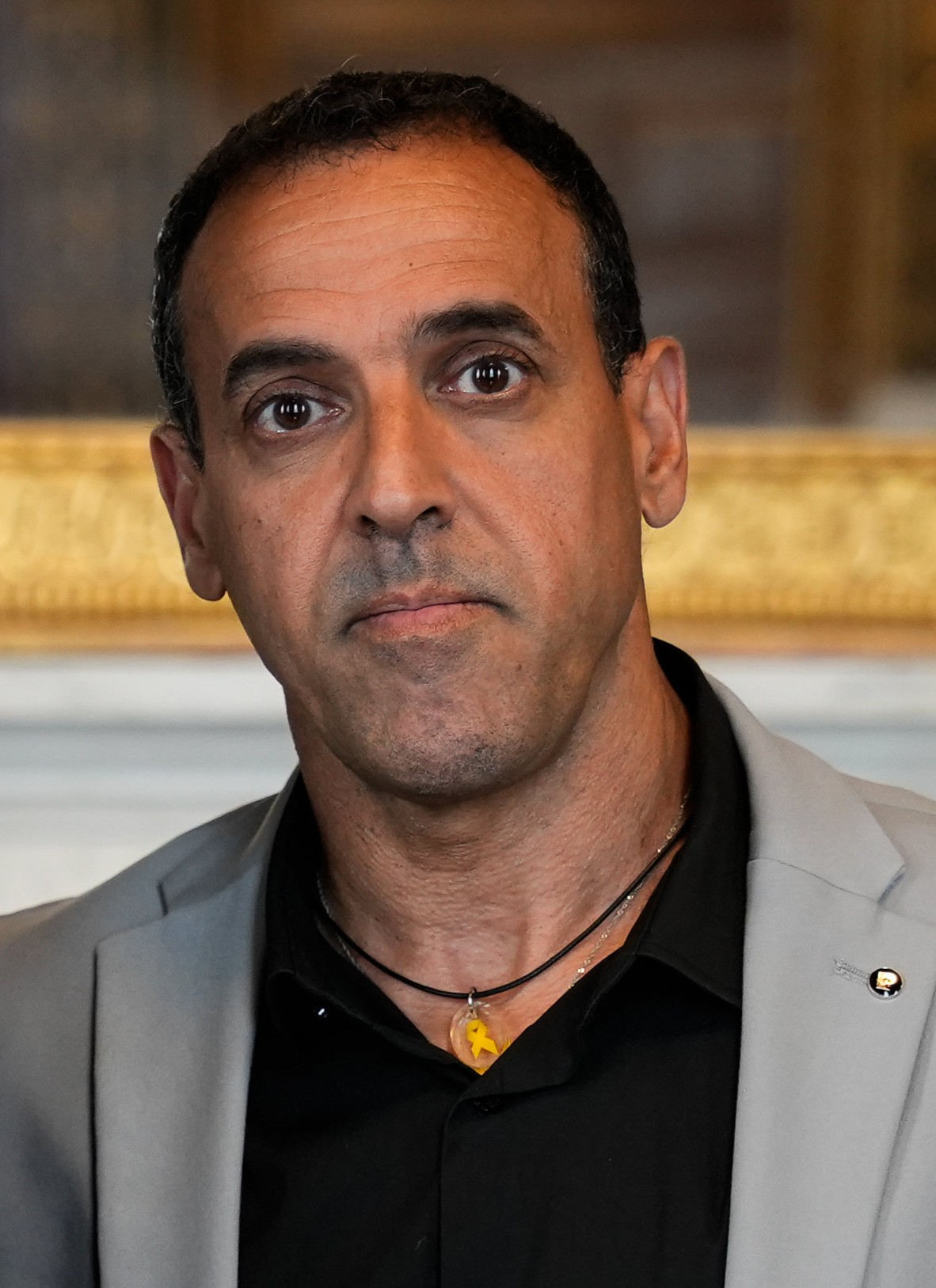
- Eli Sharabi in June 2025
- Born: February 13, 1972 (age 54); Tel Aviv, Israel
- Known for: His abduction to Gaza during the October 7 massacre and his public activity after release
- Spouse: Lian (deceased)
- Children: 2

Eli Sharabi (born February 13, 1972) is an Israeli man, known for being a hostage of Hamas.

As a resident of Kibbutz Be'eri, he was abducted during the Be'eri massacre as part of the October 7, 2023, surprise attack on Israel by Hamas militants. He was released on February 8, 2025, as part of the 2025 Hamas–Israel agreement, after 491 days in captivity. During the massacre, his wife Lian and their daughters Noya and Yahel were murdered. His brother Yossi was also kidnapped and later murdered after 100 days in captivity.

Sharabi's memoir Hostage was named by Time magazine as one of the 100 "must-read" books of 2025.

== Biography ==
Sharabi was born in Tel Aviv-Yafo to a family of Yemenite and Moroccan Jewish descent, and at age 14, he and his brother Yossi moved to Kibbutz Be'eri as youth residents. He was educated there and held various management roles, including treasurer and economic coordinator. He has another brother, Sharon, and a sister, Osnat Matalon.

In April 1995, Eli met Lian Brisley, a 20-year-old British volunteer at the kibbutz. They married in July 2000 in a modest ceremony in Bristol, and later had two daughters: Noya (born 2007) and Yahel (born 2010).

== October 7 events ==
On the morning of October 7, 2023, about 10 Hamas militants infiltrated the Sharabi family's home in Kibbutz Be'eri. Eli stated that five militants entered the home, armed with Kalashnikovs and encountered the family in their pajamas. According to testimonies, Eli and Lian decided not to resist. Lian attempted to state multiple times that she held a British passport in hopes of protection. Eli decided to cooperate with the militants, understanding he was to be taken hostage, and left with them hoping this would spare his family. He recounted later that as he was leaving his home with the militants he turned his head and told his daughters "I'll come back."

Lian (48), Noya (16), and Yahel (13) were subsequently murdered in their home. That same day, Yossi Sharabi was also abducted and was later killed in captivity. An IDF investigation found that Sharabi might have been killed in a building that collapsed following an Israeli airstrike on a different building adjacent to the one in which he was held. The investigation also raised the possibility that Sharabi had been murdered by his captors.

== Captivity ==
Eli Sharabi survived 491 days in captivity. The first 52 days were spent in a safe house in Gaza, where he was held inside the home of a Gazan family, after which he was transferred to tunnels. He reported severe conditions including continuous hunger, suffocating air, terrible sanitation, beatings, and iron chains binding his legs the entire time.

During his captivity, Sharabi was imprisoned with several other hostages at different times, including Ori Danino, Almog Sarusi, and Hersh Goldberg-Polin, who were later murdered by Hamas in a tunnel. Goldberg-Polin repeated "He who has a why to live, can bear any how" during their captivity, a quote the stuck with Sharabi. During his captivity Sharabi was under the belief that his wife and daughters were alive and had seen the protests campaigning for the hostages release, which he said became his "why" He spent most of his time with fellow hostage Alon Ohel. With Or Levy and Alon Ohel, Sharabi taught English to fellow hostage Eliya Cohen using the only book they had, a novel by Leigh Bardugo.

Sharabi said that Alon Ohel and Eliya Cohen were held in a tunnel, handcuffed and starved while their captors ate full meals in front of them. Sharabi supported Ohel and Cohen and was able to communicate with their captors in Arabic, which he speaks fluently; he also frequently spoke to Hamas members about their personal lives. Sharabi stated that he had become a father figure to Ohel during their time in captivity and after it was announced that Sharabi was to be released Ohel had a minor panic attack about the separation.

== Release ==
On February 8, 2025, Sharabi was released along with Ohad Ben Ami and Or Levy in a hostage deal. During a filmed release message by Hamas, he was informed of his brother Yossi's death. Only upon arrival at the assembly point in Re'im and meeting his brother Sharon and mother Hannah was he told of his wife and daughters' murder. During captivity, Sharabi lost over 30 kilograms, returning to Israel weighing 44 kg.

== Post-release ==
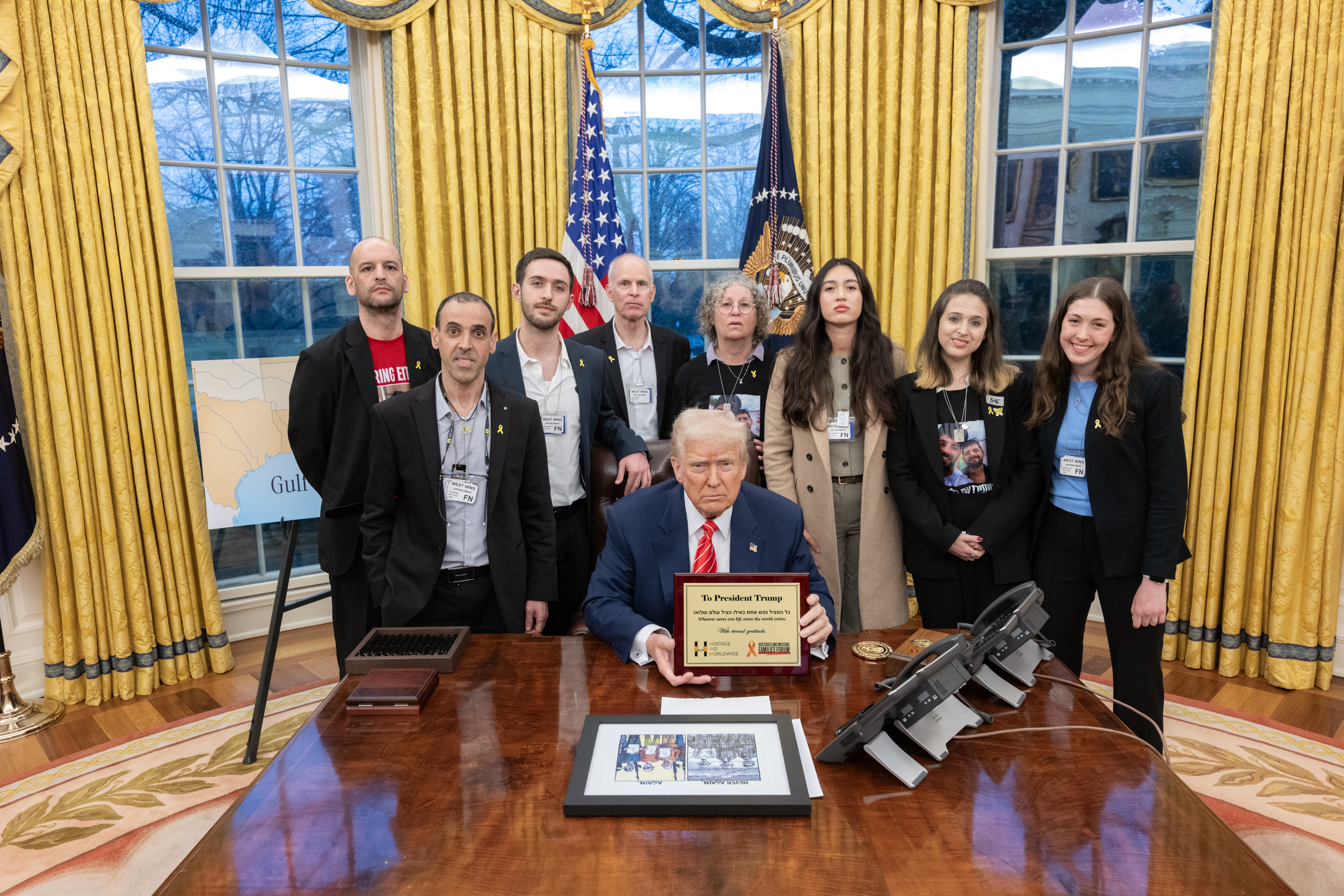
Sharabi (second from left) meeting with President Donald Trump at the White House. Also pictured: Yair Horn, Naama Levy, Omer Shem Tov, Keith Siegel, Aviva Siegel, Doron Steinbrecher, and Noa Argamani

After his release, Sharabi began physical and psychological rehabilitation. Following a brief mourning period for his family, he began a public advocacy campaign for the remaining hostages and the return of bodies held by Hamas. He gave an interview to Uvda sharing his experiences in captivity. He traveled to the United States, met President Donald Trump at the White House, and addressed the United Nations Security Council.

In May 2025, he published the book Hostage through Sella Meir. The book, the first of its kind, describes his captivity experiences. It sold over 20,000 copies within a week and received "Gold Book" status in Israel. It was published in the US on the second anniversary of the October 7 attacks by Harper Influence, an imprint of HarperCollins. The book reached the top-10 list of bestsellers of the New York Times and the Sunday Times by October 20, 2025.

In February 2026, Sharabi attended the piano concert of fellow released hostage Alon Ohel, who dedicated his solo performance of "Yesh Li Sikui" (I have a Chance) by Eviatar Banai to Sharabi stating that Sharabi had helped save him by his approach to life and recounted their experiences together. Sharabi was in attendance for the performance.

In July 2026, Sharabi criticised Benjamin Netanyahu following his interview with Channel 14 in which the Prime Minister said that he had “lost a little weight” in response to being asked how the October 7 attacks and their aftermath had changed him. Sharabi also described as "impertinent" comments made by Bezalel Smotrich in which the latter had taken credit for the release of hostages who had been held in Gaza.

Sharabi's brother, Sharon, was elected for the Yisrael Beiteinu party in the 2026 Israeli legislative election.

== See also ==
- List of Gaza war hostages
