= Eyal Gabbai =

Director-General of the Israeli Prime Minister's Office from 2009 to 2011

- איל גבאי
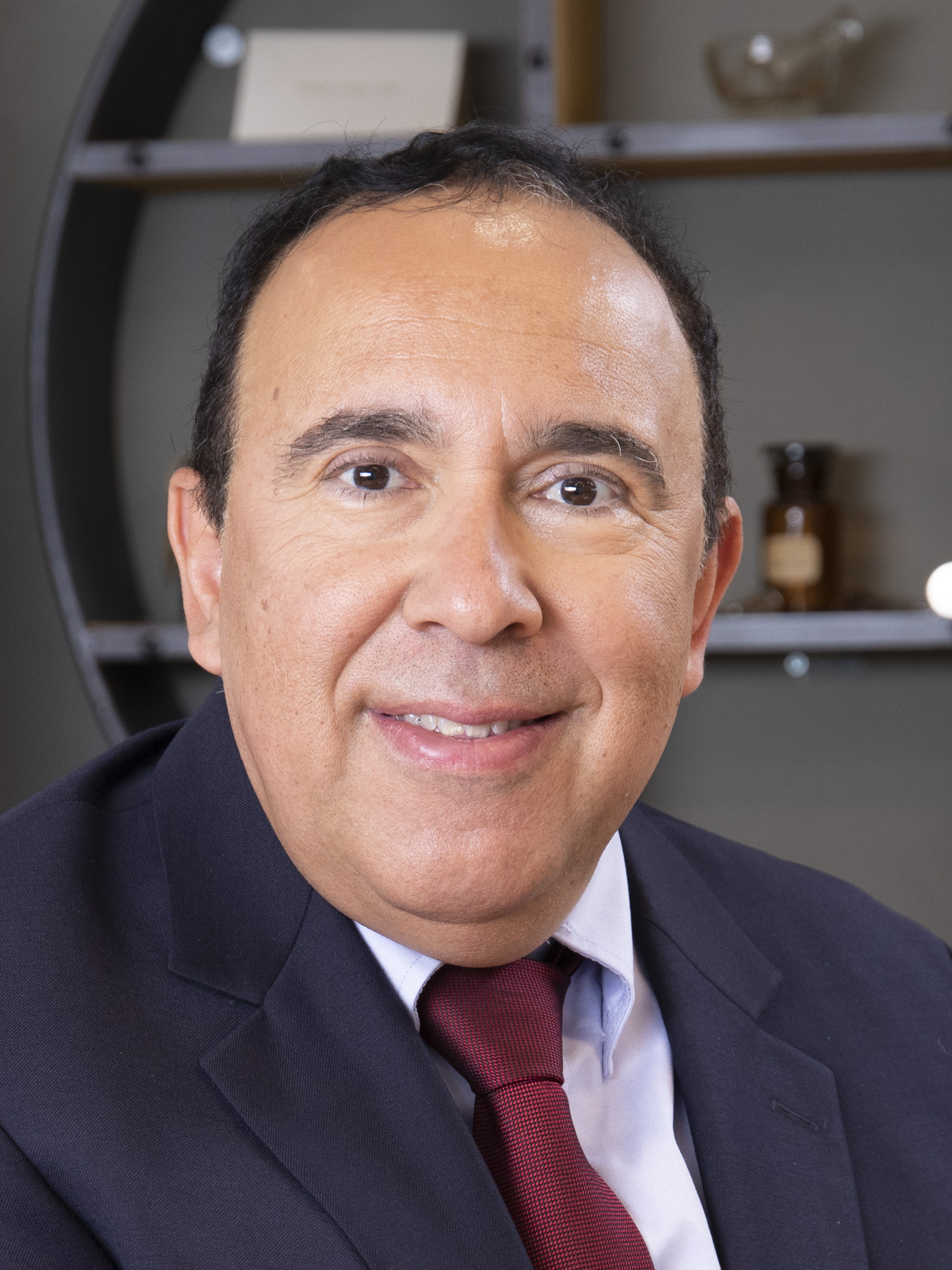
- Eyal Gabbai, 2023
- Born: 1967 (age 58–59); Jerusalem
- Known for: Former Director-General of the Israeli Prime Minister's Office

Eyal Gabbai (Hebrew: איל גבאי; born 1967 in Jerusalem) is an Israeli manager with a career spanning the capital markets and healthcare sectors. As of the mid-2020s, he serves as Chairman of Meuhedet Health Fund and the Teachers' and Kindergarten Teachers' Advanced Studies Funds. He previously held positions as Director General of the Israeli Prime Minister's Office, Director of the Government Companies Authority, and head of the Israeli branch of the Australian investment firm Babcock & Brown.

== Biography ==
Eyal Gabbai was born and raised in Jerusalem, one of four children to Israeli-born parents who were both educators. His grandparents immigrated from Persia. He attended Himmelfarb High School and served as a balloon officer in the Israeli Intelligence Corps.

Gabbai holds a bachelor's degree in Economics (summa cum laude) and Law (cum laude) from the Hebrew University of Jerusalem and a master's degree in Business Administration with a focus on finance (with distinction) from the same institution. He also worked as a teaching assistant for Professor Ruth Gavison.

Upon completing his undergraduate studies, Gabbai joined the Israel Democracy Institute and served as an assistant to the Knesset's Economic Affairs Committee. He interned at the Supreme Court under Justice Dalia Dorner and at the law firm S. Horowitz & Co.

=== Public Sector Career ===
After earning his MBA, Gabbai began his public sector career in 1996 as an advisor to Justice Minister Tzachi Hanegbi. In 1998, Prime Minister Benjamin Netanyahu appointed him to manage economic affairs in the Prime Minister's Office. From 1999 to 2000, he served as Deputy CEO for Business Development and International Relations at Bezeq International under CEO Uri Yogev.

==== Director of the Government Companies Authority ====
In 2002, Gabbai returned to public service as Director of the Government Companies Authority under Prime Ministers Ariel Sharon, Ehud Olmert, and Benjamin Netanyahu. During his tenure, he led the privatization of several major state-owned enterprises, including El Al, Bezeq, Israel Oil Refineries, and ZIM Integrated Shipping Services. He also oversaw the restructuring of Israel Railways and the transformation of the Israel Postal Authority and the Public Works Department into government-owned corporations.

Gabbai introduced innovative privatization methods, such as using game theory principles in the sale of Bezeq and floating 100% of El Al's shares on the stock exchange. His efforts earned him the nickname "The National Privatizer," with privatizations totaling approximately 16.5 billion NIS during his tenure. He also worked to enhance transparency and improve corporate governance in state-owned enterprises, removing underperforming board chairs when necessary.

In 2003, Gabbai ranked 57th on TheMarker's list of influential figures, and in 2006, he was described as "diligent, honest, and unpretentious," ranking 71st on the same list.

==== Director General of the Prime Minister's Office ====
In May 2009, Gabbai was appointed Director General of the Prime Minister's Office under Benjamin Netanyahu. He was tasked with resolving key socio-economic issues, including mediating between the Ministry of Finance and the Bank of Israel on the Bank of Israel Law, and ending a prolonged prosecutors' strike by proposing arbitration.

Gabbai also addressed the natural gas pipeline project to Haifa, which faced delays due to inter-ministerial disputes and promises made to Druze landowners. His comments on the Druze community sparked controversy, leading to calls for his suspension, but he continued to mediate and eventually facilitated the project's completion in February 2011.

He played a pivotal role in decisions affecting the ultra-Orthodox community, such as the construction of a fortified emergency room at Barzilai Medical Center and revising income support payments for yeshiva students to encourage workforce participation.

Gabbai was involved in defense-related matters, including budgeting for the border fence and mediating disputes over military retirement age and the relocation of IDF bases to the Negev. He chaired numerous committees, including the Gabbai Committee on ultra-Orthodox conscription, which aimed to double the number of Haredi soldiers within five years.

In August 2011, Gabbai joined the Trajtenberg Committee addressing the cost of living crisis following the social protests. His central role in various government initiatives earned him the nickname "The Arbitrator," and in 2010, he was ranked sixth on TheMarker's list of the 100 most influential figures in Israel's economy. Gabbai resigned from his position in September 2011 after two and a half years in office.

=== Business career ===
After leaving the Government Companies Authority, Gabbai became head of the Israeli branch of Babcock & Brown. During his tenure, the 2008 financial crisis severely impacted the firm's value, leading Gabbai to recommend closing the Israeli branch by the end of 2008.

==== Teachers' and Kindergarten Teachers' Advanced Study Funds ====
Since 2012, Gabbai has served as Chairman of the Teachers' and Kindergarten Teachers' Advanced Study Funds. During his tenure, the managed assets of the funds doubled to approximately 30 billion NIS. Under his leadership, the funds diversified their portfolio with a range of off-market real investments, including acquiring a controlling stake in the Egged bus company alongside Keystone, investing in the desalination company IDE Technologies with Clal Insurance, purchasing royalty rights from the Tamar natural gas reservoir, investing in the Dalia Power Energies plant, which led to the acquisition of the Eshkol power station from the Israel Electric Corporation, investing in the infrastructure company Minrav, and partnering with Apax in the investment firm Go Global.

In 2013, he was appointed as a court-appointed economic expert in the IDB Group case, actively intervening in negotiations to maximize creditor returns. This role earned him the fourth spot on TheMarker's list of influential capital market figures in 2013.

Gabbai served as Chairman of the real estate investment trust Megurit from September 2016 to November 2017 and as a court-appointed observer for Israel Post, where he criticized the government's management, comparing it to tycoons abandoning their companies.

==== Chairman of Meuhedet Health Provider ====
In 2016, Gabbai was appointed Chairman of the Board of Meuhedet Health Provider. In 2018, he led the acquisition of Medica, a network of private surgical centers with branches in Haifa, Afula, and Tel Aviv. Since then, Gabbai has also served as Chairman of Medica. In 2024, he oversaw Medica's acquisition of Rafael Hospital, Israel’s largest private hospital, in a deal valued at approximately 550 million NIS. This acquisition tripled Medica’s value to about 1 billion NIS, compared to its worth at the time of its purchase by Meuhedet in 2018.

Gabbai promoted the integration of telemedicine technology through the U.S.-based company American Well, positioning Meuhedet to effectively deliver remote healthcare services during the COVID-19 pandemic. He also worked with the government to establish an additional hospital in the Negev. The government ultimately approved the construction of Peres Hospital in Be'er Sheva, to be co-owned by Meuhedet and Leumit Health Funds and operated by Sheba Medical Center. The hospital's estimated cost is around 3 billion NIS.

== Public Activity ==
Gabbai was appointed Chairman of Yad Ben-Zvi by Hili Tropper.

Following the 19th Knesset elections, he participated in economic negotiations for the Jewish Home party with Likud representatives.

He was offered the position of Director General of the Prime Minister's Office by Naftali Bennett upon the formation of Israel's 36th government but chose to continue his role at Meuhedet Health Fund.

Gabbai advocates for transitioning Israel's economy to a long weekend model, including both Saturday and Sunday.

He was appointed by the President of Israel to serve on the advisory committee for awarding the Civil Valor Prize in response to the events of October 7.

== Personal life ==
He is married to Einat, a clinical psychologist, and is a father to five. His first wife died when their daughter was three-years-old. They live in Modi'in.
