= Rachel Goldberg-Polin =

American-Israeli activist

- רייצ׳ל גולדברג-פולין
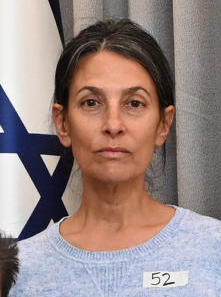
- Goldberg-Polin: the number taped to her shirt refers to the number of days her son was being held hostage, dating the photo to November 27, 2023.
- Born: Rachel Goldberg; 1969 (age 56–57); United States
- Citizenship: United States; Israel
- Education: Brandeis University
- Occupation: Activist
- Known for: Israel–Hamas war hostage crisis activism
- Spouse: Jonathan Polin
- Children: 3, including Hersh

Rachel Goldberg-Polin (Hebrew: רייצ׳ל גולדברג-פולין; born 1969) is an American-Israeli activist. During the hostage crisis which began with the October 7 attacks in 2023, Goldberg and her husband became two of the highest profile relatives of Israeli hostages advocating for their release on the world stage, meeting with U.S. President Joe Biden and Pope Francis, among other world leaders.

She began her activism after her son Hersh Goldberg-Polin was abducted by Hamas while attending the Re’im Music Festival. Hersh was murdered by Hamas in August 2024, and his body was recovered from Gaza on 31 August.

== Activism ==
Goldberg-Polin's son, Hersh, was kidnapped and abducted to the Gaza Strip during the Hamas-led attacks on Israel on October 7, 2023. Following her son's abduction, she quit her job to focus full-time on working towards freeing the hostages. She spoke to both political authorities and media organizations, including the BBC, CBS, NBC, and The Wall Street Journal. Specifically, called for the Israeli government to negotiate a hostage deal and criticized leaders for "not doing enough" to bring the hostages home. In daily life, she attempted to draw attention to the hostage crisis by putting tape on her clothing, on which she wrote the number of days since October 7. According to the Associated Press, Goldberg and her husband became two of the highest profile relatives of Israeli hostages on the world stage, meeting with U.S. President Joe Biden and Pope Francis, among other world leaders.

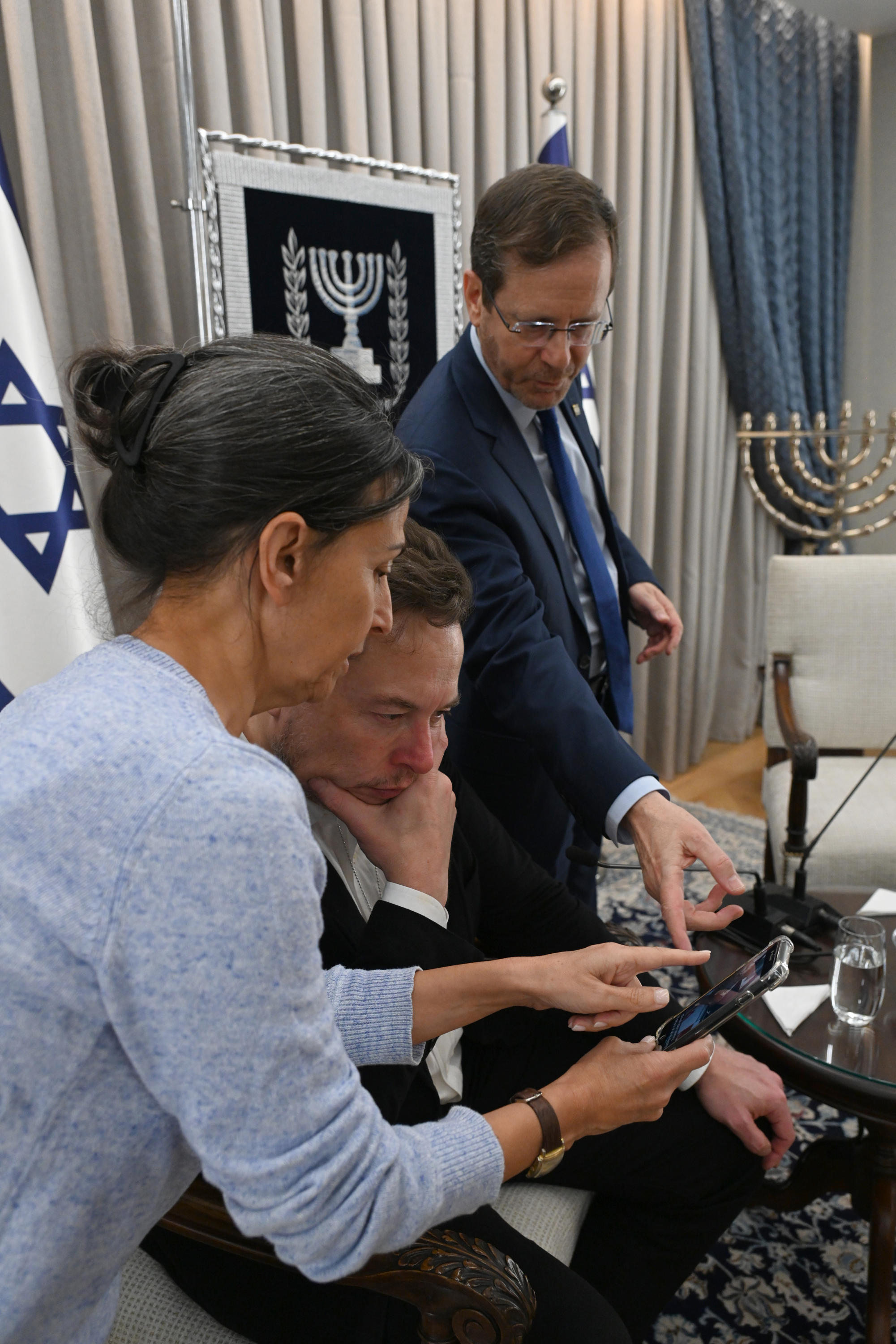
Goldberg-Polin in 2023 (with Elon Musk & Isaac Herzog)

On November 14, 2023, she attended the March for Israel rally in Washington, D.C., where she spoke about the plight of the 240 hostages. In December 2023, she gave a seven-minute speech at the United Nations in Geneva.

In February 2024, Goldberg-Polin and 11 other hostage families met with the Pope. In early April 2024, Goldberg-Polin, her husband, and other family members of hostages met with United States Vice President Kamala Harris and U.S. national security advisor Jake Sullivan, to urge action on a hostage deal. In August 2024, she and her husband spoke at the Democratic National Convention, again to urge action on a hostage deal. She received a standing ovation during her speech, during which the audience chanted "bring him home". On 30 August, she joined a protest rally on the Gaza border, during which she broadcast her voice with messages for her son.

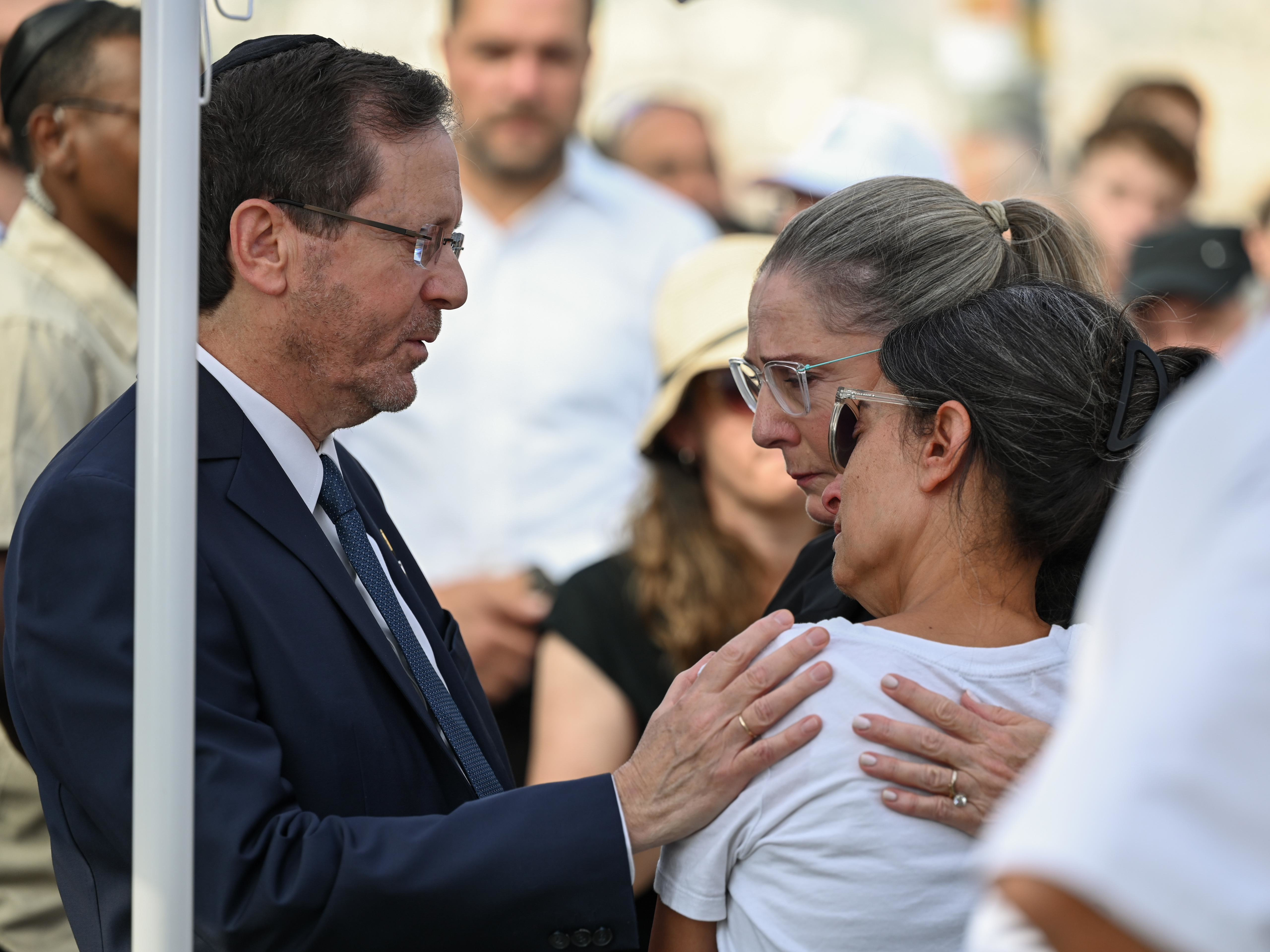
Goldberg-Polin with Michal Herzog and Isaac Herzog at the funeral of Hersh, September 2024

Following the announcement of Hersh's death on 31 August, United States President Joe Biden spoke with Rachel and her husband.

During Rachel's eulogy on 2 September, Rachel stated that:

I also pray that your death will be a turning point in this horrible situation in which we are all entangled. I take such comfort knowing you were with Carmel, Ori, Eden, Almog and Alex. From what I have been told, they each were delightful in different ways, and I think that is how the 6 of you managed to stay alive in unimaginable circumstances for so very long. You each did every single thing right to survive 329 days in what I can only call Hell. I send each of the families my deepest sympathies for what we are all going through and for the sickening feeling that we all could not save them. I think we all did every single thing we could. The hope that perhaps a deal was near, was so authentic it was crunchy. It tasted CLOSE. But it was not to be so. Those beautiful 6 survived together and those beautiful 6 died together. And now they will be remembered together forever.

— The full text of Rachel Goldberg-Polin’s eulogy for her son Hersh, at his funeral in Jerusalem, September 2, 2024,

In April 2024, she was named as one of the Time 100, which recognizes the most influential people in the world.

== Writing ==
In April 2026, Goldberg-Polin published When We See You Again, an account of her grief following her son's abduction and murder. Kirkus Reviews described the book as a portrait of "unfathomable anguish" in which Goldberg-Polin memorializes her son "with great tenderness."

It debuted at number one on the New York Times hardcover nonfiction bestseller list.

== Personal life ==
Rachel Goldberg was raised in Chicago and graduated from Brandeis University in 1992.

Goldberg-Polin, her husband, Jonathan, and their three children migrated to Israel in the early 2000s. They went on to have four more children; Hersh was their oldest. They have lived in Jerusalem since 2008. She is an observant Jew who keeps kosher.
