= Yonatan Stern =

Businessman

- יונתן שטרן
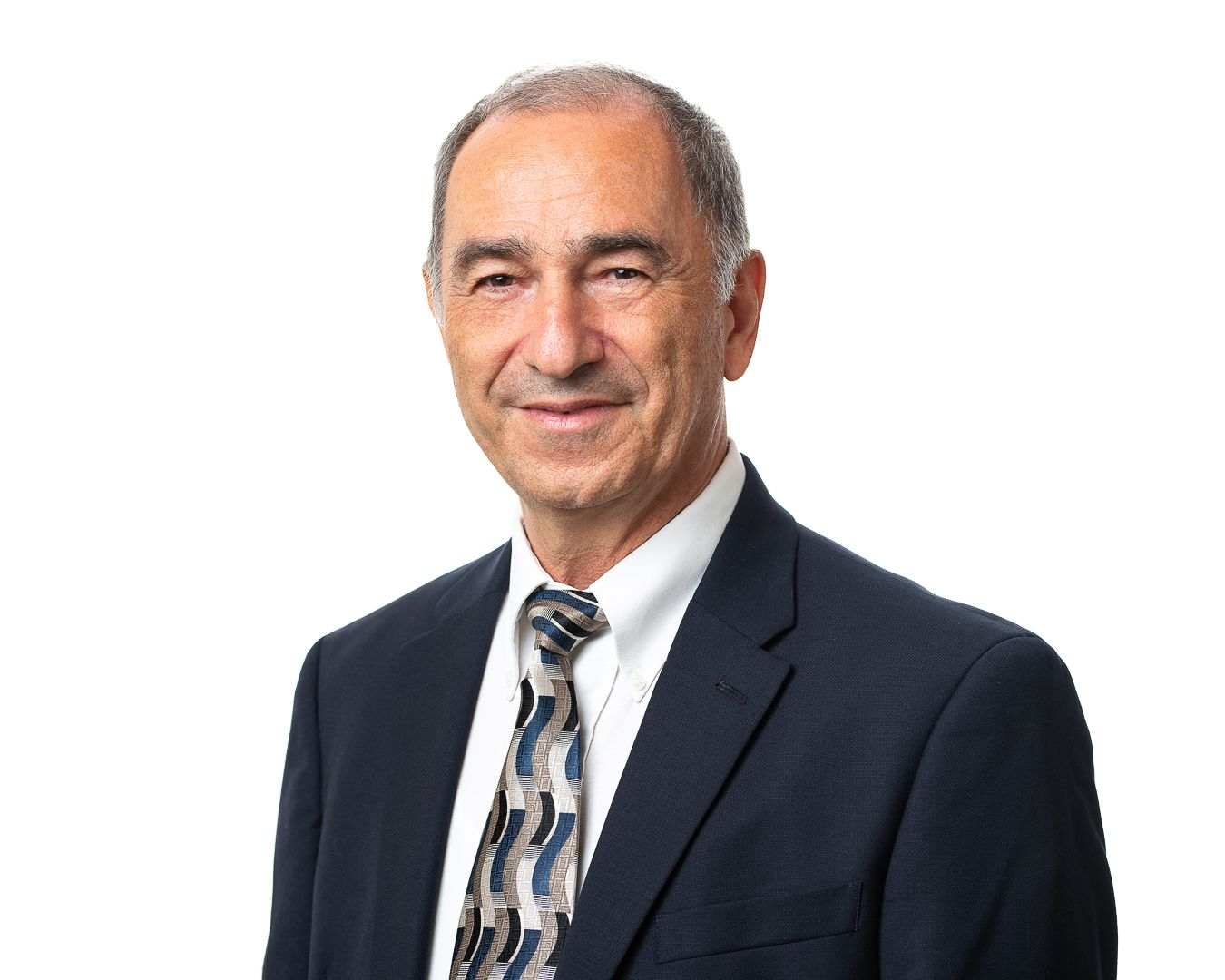
- Born: 1954 (age 71–72); Israel
- Education: Technion – Israel Institute of Technology (BSE and MSc)
- Occupation: Businessman
- Years active: 1981–present
- Children: 3

Yonatan Stern (Hebrew: יונתן שטרן) is an Israeli-American businessman. He is the founder of multiple companies, the most well known of them being ZoomInfo, a US data broker. He received a combined total of over a billion dollars via selling of some companies he founded. He was awarded the Israel Defense Prize for contributions to the defense of the State of Israel.

== Early life ==
Stern was born in Jerusalem. His mother was a descendant of the Bak family, who moved to the land of Israel in the early nineteenth century and were part of the Old Yishuv. His father arrived in Mandatory Palestine after fleeing Czechoslovakia, following a pogrom that erupted in his hometown of Pezinok in 1939 in the lead up to the Holocaust. He is one of three children.

His maternal grandfather is the Haredi artist Yitzhak Bak.

Stern was in the first graduating class of Himmelfarb High School and then went on to graduate cum laude from the Technion, with a bachelors (1976) and masters (1980) in computer science, working with Professor Shimon Even. He served in the Israeli Army, rising to the rank of Major in the Israeli Intelligence Corps. While in the army he was awarded the Israel Defense Prize in recognition of projects accomplished by his unit - Unit 8200.

== Career ==
Throughout Stern has founded numerous companies. His served as the CEO for his first company, Rosh Intelligent Systems, a company providing software maintenance and diagnostic solutions. Dan Tolkovsky was one of the first investors in the company. Stern moved to Boston in 1989 to manage the Rosh headquarters there. Rosh (later renamed ServiceSoft) was sold to Broadbase Software in 2002.

Stern left Rosh in 1993 to found Corex Technologies Inc. (later renamed to CardScan), a company selling business card scanners. He served the role of CEO until 2006 when it was acquired by Dymo.

In 2000, he founded Eliyon Technologies. It received investment from Venrock, and later the company changed its name to Zoom Information Inc. ZoomInfo is a data broker, and the company collects and sells personal data, both public and private, through various means of data and web scraping. Stern was the founder, CEO and Chief Scientist at ZoomInfo, and has six patents issued in his name. He developed most of the core technology that still runs the company. In 2017 the company was sold to Great Hill Partners, a private equity firm for $240 million, with Stern staying on as CEO until July 2018, and remaining on the company's board. Six months after leaving the CEO position, the company was sold to DiscoverOrg for $785 million, who later adopted the ZoomInfo name and brand for the combined company. As of 2026, ZoomInfo is the subject of numerous complaints and multiple lawsuits for illegally collecting and selling personal data without consent, misleading investors and artificially inflating its stock price. Zoominfo is accused of "omitting truthful information about the company’s customer base, its subscription renewal practices, and other issues from SEC filings and related material" in the latter lawsuit.

In 2008, Stern was a co-founder of Bizo, a spin-off from ZoomInfo. The company provided business demographic data for online publishers. Bizo was acquired by LinkedIn in 2014 for $175 million.

After leaving ZoomInfo in 2018, Stern went on to found SmartUp Academy, a program dedicated to teaching entrepreneurs how to build profitable companies. The Academy hosts lectures and workshops for entrepreneurs, CEOs and founders. The company also serves as a cofounder for many of the companies that it works with, focusing on growth and scale, and investing in them. Since 2020 Stern has invested in over a dozen companies, including Opster, which was sold to Elastic in 2023.

== Awards and recognition ==
In 1980 Stern was awarded the Israel Defense Prize.

Stern was nominated for the Ernst & Young's Young Entrepreneur of the Year award three times, in 1998, 1999 and 2001.

In 2025 Stern gave a Tedx Talk at the Technion focusing on how to build a thriving company.
