= Elhanan Miller =

Israeli teacher and writer (born 1981)

- אלחנן מילר
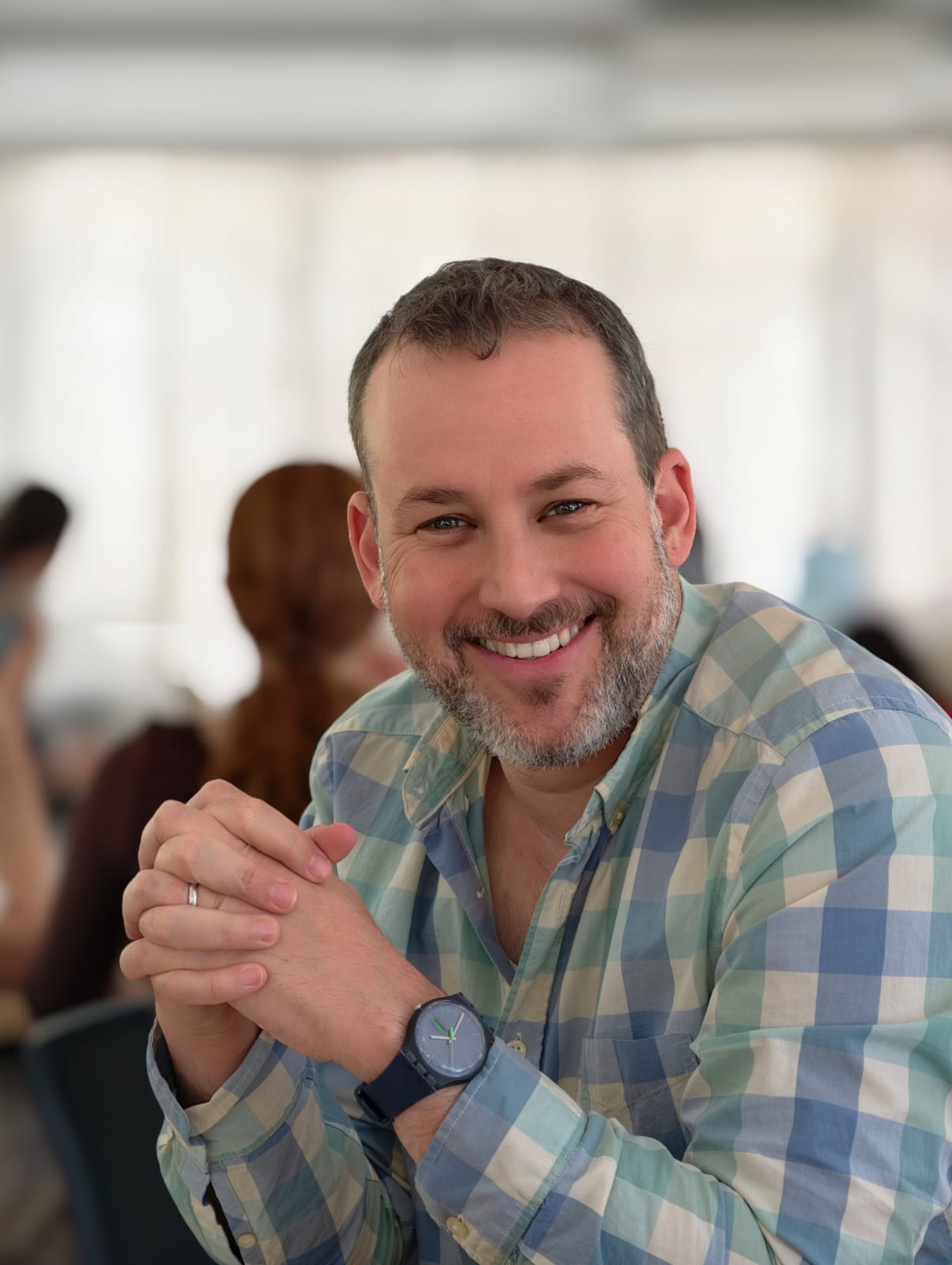
- Born: 20 August 1981 (age 45); Jerusalem, Israel
- Education: B.A. from Hebrew University of Jerusalem; M.A. in Islamic and Middle Eastern studies from Hebrew University of Jerusalem
- Occupations: Teacher, writer, rabbi
- Known for: Journalism on Arab world; educational initiative "People of the Book"

Elhanan Miller (Hebrew: אלחנן מילר; born August 20, 1981) is an Israeli teacher and writer specializing in the Arab world.

== Biography ==
Miller was born in Jerusalem to a Modern Orthodox family. The son of Ted Miller, a family physician, and Reisie Miller (née Tward), a librarian, his parents immigrated from Toronto, Canada, in 1973 and settled in the Ramot neighborhood, where he spent his childhood years. Miller graduated from Himmelfarb High School with a major in Arabic, and served as a translator and linguist in the Intelligence Corps. Following his mandatory military service, Miller studied at the Ein Tzurim religious kibbutz yeshiva, before completing a master's degree in Islamic and Middle Eastern studies at Hebrew University. His master’s thesis examined issues of religion and state in Israel in the writings of Israeli philosopher Yeshayahu Leibowitz and Egyptian judge Muhammad Sa'id al-Ashmawi.

Miller was active in the university's debating club and participated in national and international competitions. In 2007, he and his partner Raanan Eichler were finalists in the World University Debating Championships held in Vancouver, Canada. Miller was awarded the title of Second-Best Speaker (English as a second language).

== Journalism ==
In 2010, Miller volunteered as a Jewish studies teacher at École Yabné in Paris, France, for the Jewish Agency. He returned to Jerusalem that summer and began working as a journalist covering the Arab world. In 2012, he joined the founding staff of the online newspaper Times of Israel and served as its Arab affairs reporter. Since 2016, Miller has been working as a freelance journalist and commentator on Israeli politics on Arabic TV channels including Al-Jazeera, BBC Arabic, Sky News Arabia, and France24 Arabic.

Miller covered the militant activities of Palestinians against Israelis. He interviewed family members of Marwan Qawasmeh and Amer Abu Aisha, the kidnappers of three Israeli teenagers (Naftali Frankel, Gil-ad Shaar, and Eyal Yafarah), a day after their homes were detonated by the IDF; the parents of Palestinian Abdel Fattah Sharif who was executed by IDF soldier Elor Azaria; the father of Malek Sharif who was shot and killed before he carried out a stabbing attack at the Gush Etzion junction; and the family members of Ezz a-Din al-Masri, the suicide bomber of the Sbarro restaurant suicide attack in 2001.

In 2016, Miller was a recipient of the Richard Beeston Bursary and worked at the foreign desk of The Times in London. In September 2018, Miller was dispatched by Tablet magazine to Istanbul, Turkey, to interview Husam Badran, a senior Hamas official and member of the organization's Political Bureau. Badran revealed Hamas's position on the rehabilitation of Gaza and the release of their Israeli abductees.

== Rabbinic career ==
In 2016, Miller joined the first cohort of Beit Midrash Harel, an egalitarian Orthodox rabbinical program in Jerusalem, and was ordained as a rabbi in 2019. He served as rabbi of the Jewish community in Canberra, Australia, throughout 2020.

Miller explained his decision to switch from journalism to a career as a rabbi in an interview with the Jewish Telegraphic Agency in 2017: “I want to be a rabbi who brings peace to the world.”

In 2017, while studying to be a rabbi, Miller launched "People of the Book", an educational initiative aimed at exposing Arab viewers online to Jewish faith and culture, using short videos distributed on social media. As part of the initiative, Miller interviewed dozens of Arabic-speaking Jews and held a series of in-depth conversations with a Muslim colleague, Celia Jawabreh. The project has 500,000 subscribers to its Facebook and YouTube channels, mostly in the Arab world.
