= Sharon Sharabi =

Israeli social activist and politician

Faction represented in the Knesset
- 2026–: Yisrael Beiteinu

Personal details
- Born: 12 April 1975 (age 51)

Sharon Sharabi (born 12 April 1975) is an Israeli social activist and politician known for his advocacy for the release of hostages held in the Gaza Strip following the abduction of his two brothers, Eli and Yossi Sharabi, from Be'eri during the 7 October attacks. In May 2026, he joined the Yisrael Beiteinu party ahead of the 2026 Israeli legislative election and was elected to the Knesset.

== Biography ==
Sharon Sharabi was born in Tel Aviv to Ratzon and Hanna Sharabi and grew up in the city's Kfar Shalem neighborhood. He attended Tzvi Shapira Elementary School and Municipal High School A. In November 1993, he enlisted in the Israel Defense Forces (IDF), serving in communications and intelligence units.

Following his discharge, Sharabi began working at Bank Hapoalim in 1998. He serves as deputy head of information technology procurement. In 2004, he completed a bachelor's degree in economics at the Open University of Israel, specializing in project management, technology procurement and negotiation.

Following the abduction of his brothers Eli and Yossi Sharabi during the 7 October attacks in 2023, Sharabi became an advocate for the release of the hostages held by Hamas in Gaza. In January 2024, the family was informed that Yossi Sharabi had been killed in captivity. Sharon continued campaigning for the return of his brother's remains and the release of Eli, alongside the other hostages.

In February 2025, Eli Sharabi was released as part of a hostage exchange agreement after 491 days in captivity. Following his release, Eli joined Sharon in advocating for the return of the remaining hostages.

On 4 May 2026, Sharabi announced that he was joining the Yisrael Beiteinu party, led by Avigdor Lieberman.

He was elected to the Knesset in the 2026 Israeli legislative election.

Sharabi is married, has four daughters and resides in Alfei Menashe.
