= Hostage (Charles Bukowski album) =

Live album by Charles Bukowski
- Released: 1985
- Recorded: April 1980
- Venue: Redondo Beach, California
- Genre: Spoken word

Hostage is a 1985 spoken word and poetry album by Charles Bukowski. The single track was recorded live at Redondo Beach, California in April 1980.
