= Hostage (memoir) =

Memoir by Eli Sharabi

- Editor: Tzvi Ben Meir
- Author: Eli Sharabi
- Translator: Eylon Levy
- Language: Hebrew
- Subject: Captivity under Hamas
- Genre: Autobiography
- Publisher: Sella Meir
- Publication date: June 5, 2025
- Publication place: Israel
- English publication date: October 7, 2025
- Pages: 237

Hostage is a 2025 autobiography by Israeli hostage survivor Eli Sharabi, recounting his 491 days in Hamas captivity in the Gaza Strip following his abduction from his home during the October 7 attacks in Be'eri on the morning of October 7, 2023. The book was published in June 2025 by Sella Meir.

Within its first week of release, the book became a bestseller on the Israel Hayom list, selling over 20,000 copies in five days and earning a Gold Book Award. It later achieved Platinum (70,000 copies) and Diamond (100,000 copies) certifications, becoming the fastest-selling title in Hebrew publishing history.

== Background ==
Eli Sharabi is a member of Kibbutz Be'eri, with a B.A. in economics and management and an MBA from Ben-Gurion University of the Negev. Over the years, he served as the kibbutz treasurer, business manager, and board director. In October 2023, he worked as chief financial officer at the Iridium investment fund.

On October 7, 2023, during the Hamas attack on Israel, Sharabi was taken hostage from his home in Kibbutz Be'eri. During the attack, his wife Lian and his two daughters, Noya and Yahel, who were 16 and 13 years old, were murdered. His brother, Yossi Sharabi, was also kidnapped and later killed in captivity.

== Content ==
In Hostage, Sharabi describes life in captivity in Gaza, the physical conditions, the psychological warfare, religious coercion attempts by his captors, and the bonds formed among the hostages. He recounts moments when the captors offered food in exchange for reciting Quranic verses, and how he and others refused. The book also deals with his emotional and spiritual recovery following his release.

== Publication ==
The book was officially launched on May 30, 2025 at the ANU – Museum of the Jewish People in Tel Aviv, and released on 5 June 2025. Sharabi later began giving motivational lectures in Israel and abroad under the title "The Light at the End of the Tunnel", sharing his story and message of hope and faith.

The English translation, by Eylon Levy, was published by HarperCollins under the imprint Harper Influence on October 7, 2025. A wider international edition in additional languages is scheduled for release in late 2025.

== Reception ==
Hostage was the first memoir of a former hostage in the Gaza war.

Writing for The Jewish Chronicle, reviewer Ben Kaplan described the book as "a highly readable account of barely imaginable nightmare" praising Sharabi’s ability to blend documentary precision with deep emotional resonance.

In Israel, the Hebrew edition set national sales records, selling over 20,000 copies within five days, surpassing 100,000 copies by September 2025, and earning Gold, Platinum, and Diamond Book Awards.

Upon its release in the United States in October 2025, Hostage entered the New York Times Best Seller list at number four, reflecting wide international readership and growing global interest in firsthand accounts of the Gaza war.

== See also ==
- Holding Liat
