= Noam's Song 2 =

Single by Maor Ashkenazi
- Language: Hebrew
- English title: "Noam's Song 2"
- Released: November 12, 2023
- Genre: Trap; Israeli hip hop
- Length: 3:10
- Songwriter: Maor Ashkenazi
- Producer: Dean Perlis y O Levin

Maor Ashkenazi singles chronology
"סביבה רעילה" (2023)	"Noam's Song 2" (2023)	"סביבה רעילה" (2023)

Music video
- "Noam's Song 2" on YouTube

"Noam's Song 2" (Hebrew:השיר של נעם 2) is a song by the musical duo consisting of Israeli rappers Maor Ashkenazi and Noam Cohen. It was released as a single on November 12, 2023.

== Background and origin ==
The song was written by Maor Ashkenazi and Noam Cohen, as a sequel to the song "Noam's Song" (2022) from Ashkenazi's debut album, "טיפשים וצעירים", about the story of Cohen, surviving the Hamas attack on the festival in Re'im.

A review of "Noam's Song" in The Times of Israel said the song "encapsulates a sense of mixed feelings and confusion" following the Hamas-led attack in October 2023 while an article in The Jerusalem Post described it as a "melancholic rap."

== Music and lyrics ==
"Noam's Song 2" is a trap song, typical of Israeli hip hop, with a minimalist drill beat. Vocalists Noam Cohen and Maor Ashkenazi trade off verses in the song.

== Charts ==
On the official Galgalat parade, which resumed on November 29 after an eight-week hiatus following the Gaza war, the song entered tenth place.

Chart performance for "Noam's Song 2"
Chart (2023)	Peak position
Israeli Singles Chart	8

== See also ==
- Israel–Hamas war in Israeli music
- Cohen@Mushon
