= Maor Ashkenazi =

Israeli musician (born 2000)

Maor Ashkenazi מאור אשכנזי
- Born: 23 June 2000 (age 26); Rishon LeZion, Central District, Israel
- Genre: Hip hop
- Occupations: Rapper; singer; songwriter; record producer
- Years active: 2018–present

Maor Ashkenazi (Hebrew: מאור אשכנזי; born 23 June 2000) is an Israeli rapper, singer, songwriter and producer. He co-wrote and produced the single "Noam's Song 2" with Noam Cohen. The song is about Cohen's experience as a survivor of the Re'im music festival massacre on 7 October 2023. The song entered at number 33 on the Mako chart. At its peak, it reached number 26 on the Israeli charts.

== Early life ==
Ashkenazi grew up in Rishon LeZion, and his parents divorced when he was one year old. Ashkenazi started writing at age 13.

From 2016 to 2018, Maor Ashkenazi served in the Israel Defense Forces and received an honorable discharge once he completed his mandatory service in the IDF as a combat medic in Battalion 932. Towards the end of his military service, Ashkenazi participated in a rap and hip-hop course at the Rimon School of Music's foreign studies department, led by rapper Segol 59.

== Career ==
In 2018, Ashkenazi released his debut single, "Fools and Young". Between 2018 and 2022, he released several singles from his debut album, called "Fools And Young", after the name of the debut single. The album was released on 11 November 2022, about four years after the release of the first single, and included a special appearance by singer Keren Crispil.

In November 2023, during the Gaza war, Ashkenazi and Noam Cohen, one of the survivors of the Re'im music festival massacre, released the song "Noam's Song 2". From Ashkenazi's debut album, the song deals with Cohen's experience during the massacre. The song peaked at number 26 on the Mako chart and tenth on the Mako chart. At its peak, it reached number 26 on the charts. In the official Galgalat parade, which resumed on 29 November after an eight-week hiatus following the onset of the Gaza war, the song entered in tenth place.

== Discography ==
=== Album ===
- 2022: טיפשים וצעירים (Stupid and young)

== See also ==
- Israeli hip hop
- Music of Israel
- Ofer Levi
- Jonathan Mergui
