= The Hostages (Laurens) =

Painting by Jean-Paul Laurens

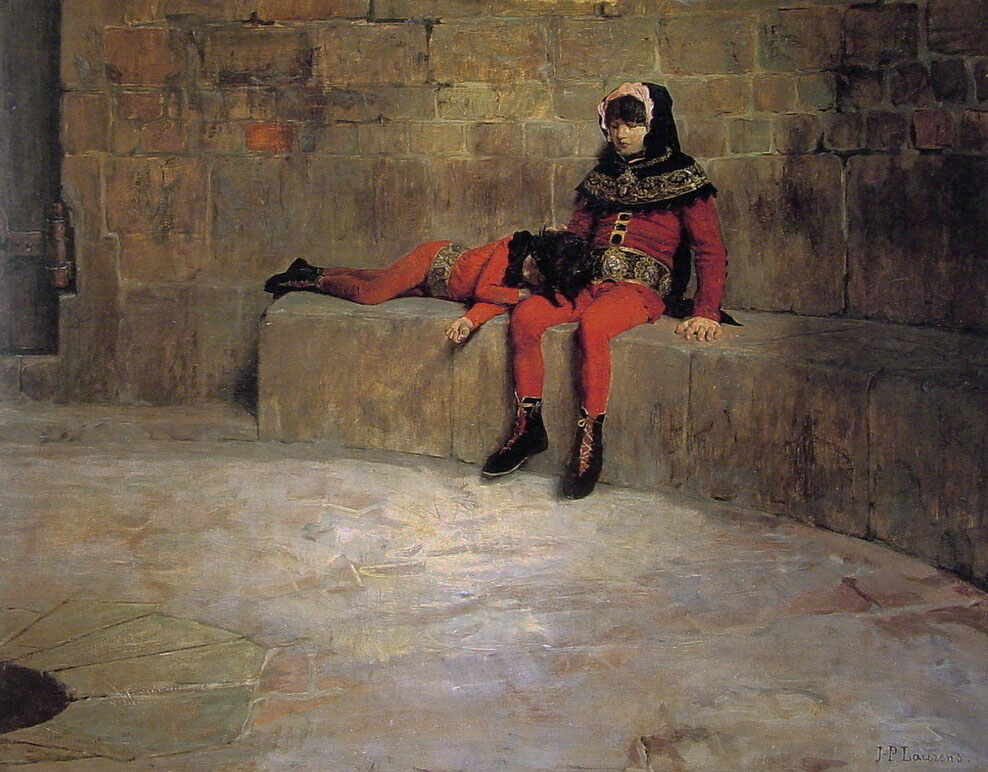
- Artist: Jean-Paul Laurens
- Year: 1896
- Medium: oil on canvas
- Dimensions: 140 cm × 146 cm (55 in × 57 in)
- Location: Museum of Fine Arts of Lyon; Lyon

The Hostages is an 1896 oil on canvas painting created by French painter and sculptor Jean-Paul Laurens, the last in a series of historical works by him. He does not give a specific historical setting, although he evokes the Princes in the Tower and Richard III of England. It is now collected in the Museum of Fine Arts of Lyon.
