= Killing of Aner Shapira =

2023 killing during the October 7 attacks

Aner Shapira
- ענר אליקים שפירא
- Born: March 12, 2001; Jerusalem, Israel
- Died: October 7, 2023 (aged 22); Re'im, Israel

Aner Elyakim Shapira (Hebrew: ענר אליקים שפירא; March 12, 2001 – October 7, 2023) was an Israeli who was killed during the Hamas-led October 7 attacks on Israel. During the Nova music festival massacre, while taking cover in a shelter, Shapira retrieved 7 explosive grenades that were thrown into the shelter by Hamas operatives, and threw them back at the attackers. Ultimately, he saved the lives of at least 7 people who survived the massacre. For his actions, he was referred to as a hero by Israeli and international media.

== Personal ==
Aner Elyakim Shapira was born on March 12, 2001. He was an alumnus of the Himmelfarb High School for boys in Jerusalem. After graduating from high school Shapira attempted to enlist, but was injured at least twice prior to serving causing his service to be delayed for a little over a year. At the time of his death, he was serving in an elite unit of the Nahal Brigade in the Israel Defense Forces.

Shapira's grandfather, Hanina Ben-Menahem, is a professor-emeritus of Jewish law at the Hebrew University. His grandmother, Yemima Ben-Menahem, is also a professor-emeritus. His great-grandfather was Haim-Moshe Shapira, one of the signatories of the Declaration of Independence of Israel.

== Killing ==
On October 7, 2023, Shapira went to the Nova music festival in Reim with his friend Hersh Goldberg-Polin. When Hamas militants attacked the event, Shapira's commander called and told him to report to the Sufa military base; however, due to shooting, he and his friends ran into a public missile shelter in Re'im at approximately 7:55 am, hiding with about two dozen other people. According to the testimonies of the survivors, Shapira was the last to enter the shelter. Shapira reportedly attempted to inspire hope for those in the shelter by telling them that the Israeli military would arrive soon. Shapira stood near the exit, telling those next to him that if the shelter was attacked by militants or grenades, he would throw the grenades back.

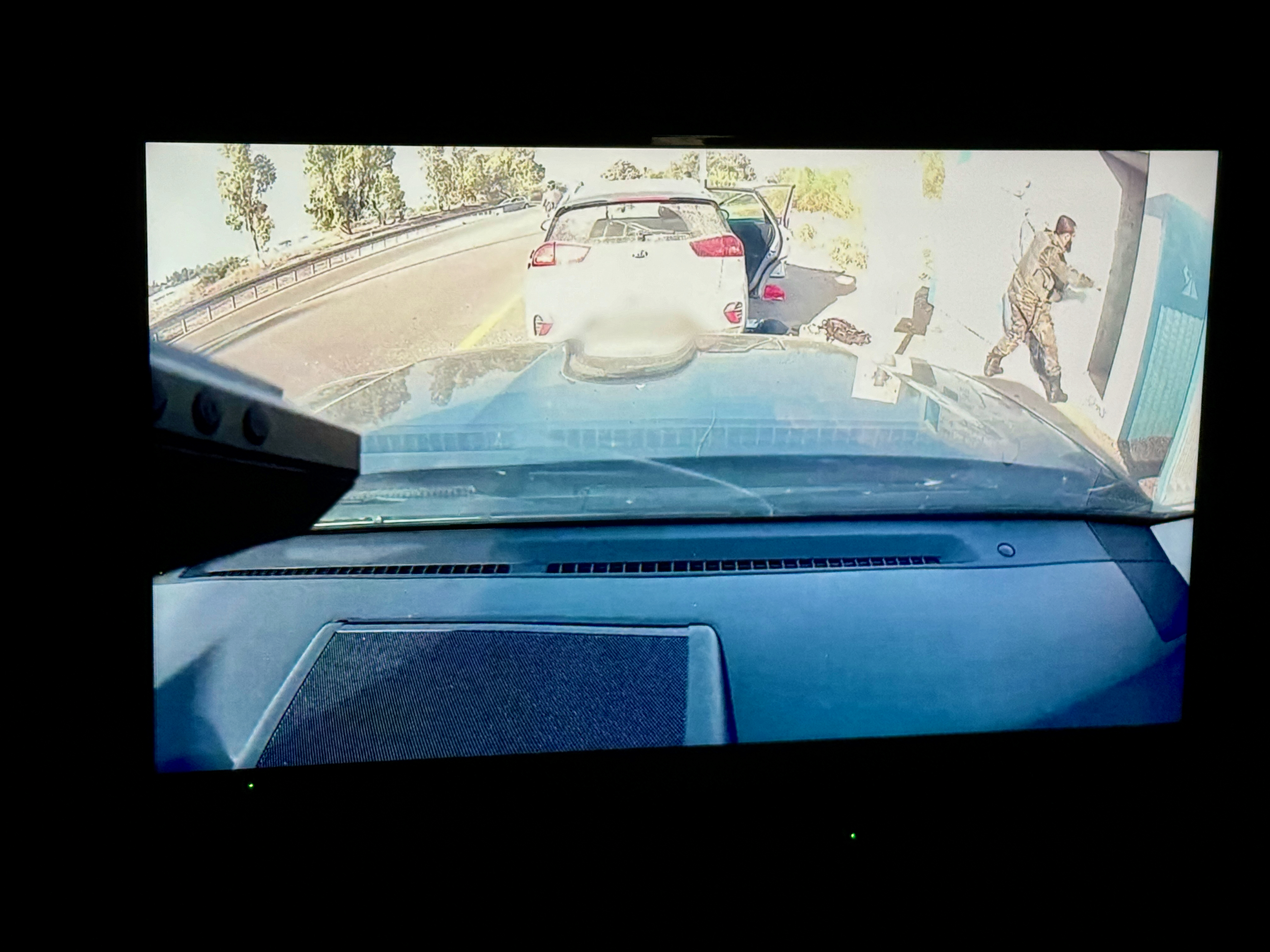
Militant throwing a grenade into the shelter with Aner Shapira

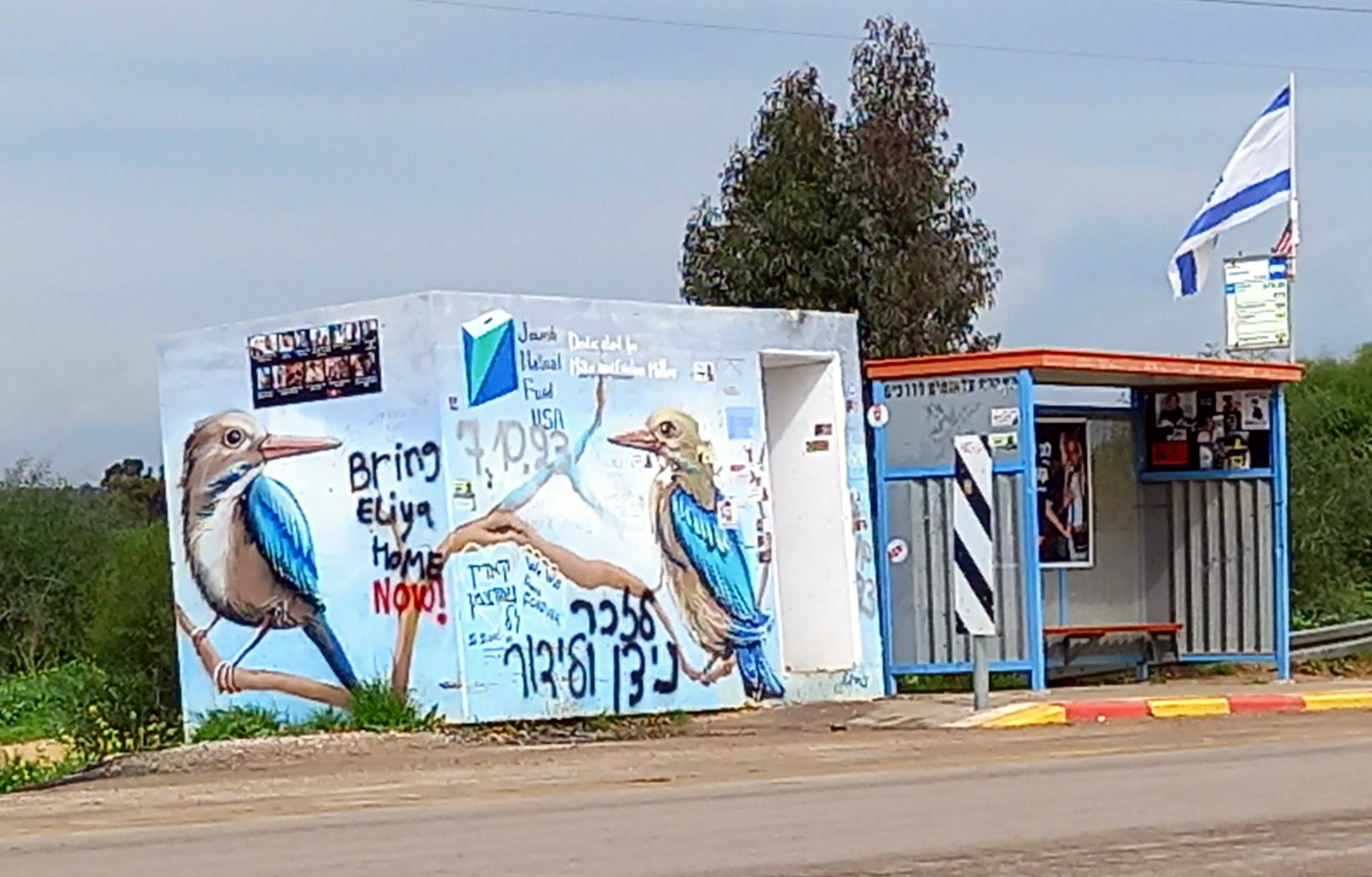
The shelter in which Shapira threw grenades out and was killed in during the 7 October attack - February 2024

For several minutes, Hamas militants shot bullets and fired rocket-propelled grenades into the shelter to kill those hiding, with Shapira ejecting the grenades from the shelter seven times; the eighth exploded in his hands, killing him. On November 14, a video of this act appeared online; it had been captured by a windshield camera on a vehicle near the shelter. Shapira's friend Goldberg-Polin, who was also reportedly throwing back grenades, lost his hand from a grenade explosion, but was able to tie a tourniquet around his arm and was subsequently taken hostage. At least seven people who were hiding in the shelter with Shapira ultimately survived the attack.

Shapira's parents, Shira and Moshe, were unaware of what happened to their son until survivors of the event began calling them to tell them about their son's actions. One of the survivors hiding alongside Shapiro later noted, "Aner Shapira... saved our lives, and he deserves a medal of honor for being the angel who kept us safe".

== Commemoration ==
Shapira was buried on 13 October 2023 at a military cemetery on Mount Herzl, and his parents released one of his original songs shortly after. His parents released additional music by Shapira in March 2024, with additions by Israeli musician Sha'anan Streett.

During the first occurrence of Hanukkah following Shapira's death, Israeli poet Zur Erlich published a poem commemorating Shapira's actions and linked the eight candles and days of Hanukkah to the eight grenades thrown into the shelter in which Shapira was hiding. In December 2023, the actions of Shapira were commemorated by the Hapoel Jerusalem football team at the beginning of the match between them and Hapoel Tel Aviv team during the Israel Premier League. Shapira's song that was released shortly after his death was played at the start of the match with his paintings projected on screens around the stadium.

Following his death, the name "Aner" has become much more common in Israel. Chosen as a name for about a dozen children a year before the October 7th massacre, the Aner Shapira Association has reported nearly 300 children have been given the name in the three following years.

== See also ==
- Re'im music festival massacre
- We Will Dance Again
