= Kidnapping and killing of Hersh Goldberg-Polin =

American-Israeli hostage killed in Gaza

- Part of the Nova music festival massacre and the Gaza war hostage crisis
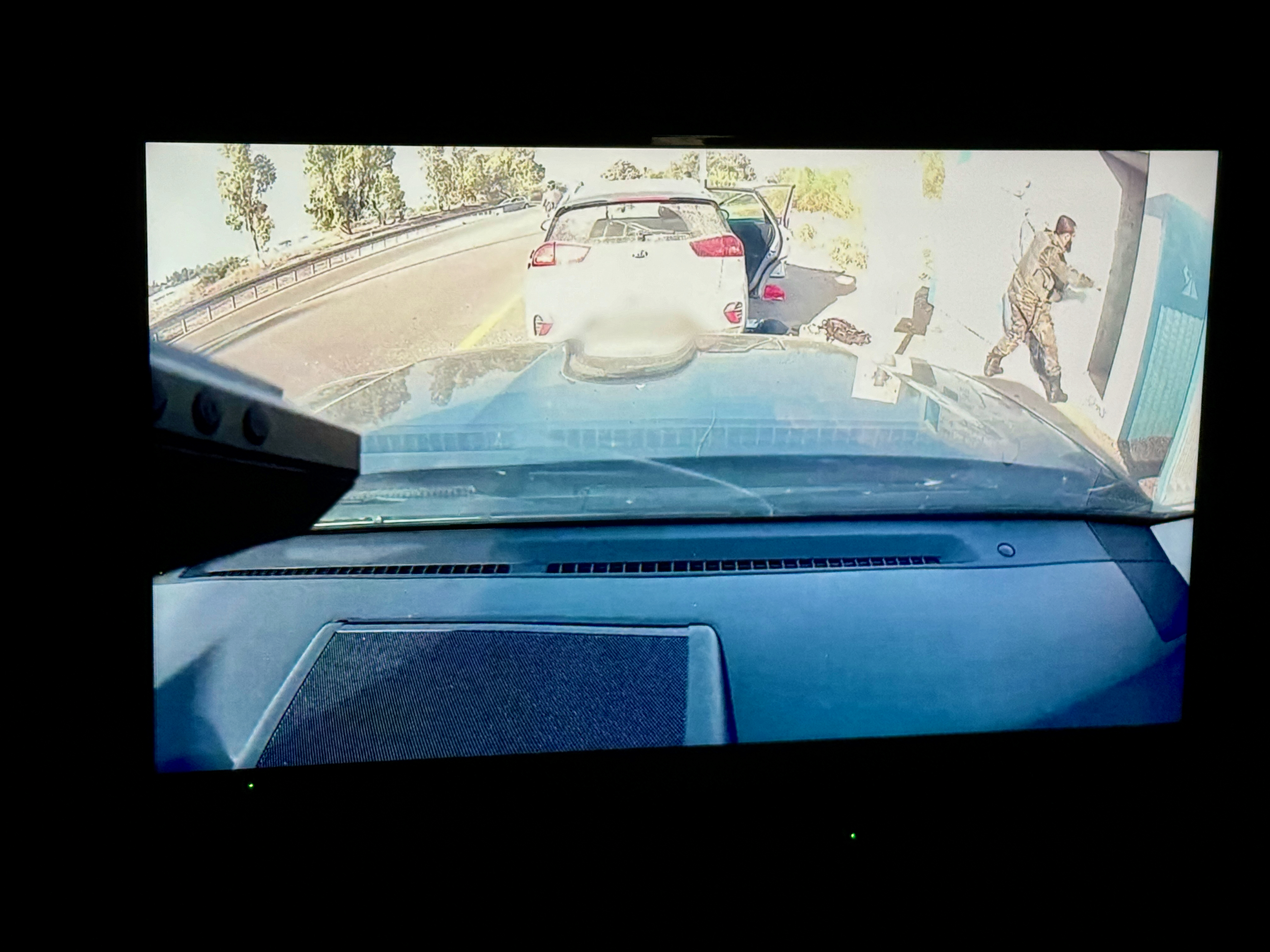
- A militant throwing a grenade into the shelter with Goldberg-Polin
- Location: Kidnapping: Eshkol Regional Council, Israel; Body found: a Hamas tunnel in Rafah
- Date: Kidnapping: 7 October 2023; 3 years ago Killing: 29 or 30 August 2024; 2 years ago
- Attack type: Kidnapping, killing
- Victims: Hersh Goldberg-Polin, aged 23
- Perpetrator: Hamas
- Charges: Terrorism, conspiracy to murder US nationals, and conspiracy to use weapons of mass destruction resulting in death filed against five Hamas leaders (plus one deceased leader) by United States Department of Justice

As part of the Hamas-led attack on Israel on 7 October 2023, 23-year-old American-Israeli Hersh Goldberg-Polin (Hebrew: הרש גולדברג-פולין) was wounded and abducted by Hamas during the Re'im music festival massacre. He was held hostage for almost 11 months, until his body was recovered from a tunnel in Rafah in the Gaza Strip on 31 August 2024.

It was later revealed that Goldberg-Polin and five other hostages with him were killed by Hamas. His autopsy indicated he was likely shot from "close range" 1–2 days before his body was found.

== Biography ==
Goldberg-Polin was the son of Jon Polin and Rachel Goldberg, both originally from the Chicago area. Born on 3 October 2000 in Berkeley, California, he lived in Richmond, Virginia, before immigrating to Israel with his family in 2008. Goldberg-Polin has two younger sisters.

Goldberg-Polin was reportedly working with an initiative that was using soccer to bring Israeli and Palestinian children together. He decorated his bedroom with artwork bearing the message "JERUSALEM IS EVERYONE'S" in English, Hebrew and Arabic. He had reportedly planned a two-year world travel trip that was to have started during the last week of December 2023, two and a half months after he was abducted. Goldberg-Polin served in the Israel Defense Forces and completed his mandatory service in April 2023.

== Abduction ==
Goldberg-Polin was at the Re'im music festival when Hamas attacked the morning of 7 October. At around 8:00am, he sent his family a text message, "I love you". Ten minutes later he added, "I'm sorry". During the attack, Goldberg-Polin, his best friend Aner Shapira, and others took refuge in a field shelter. Hamas militants repeatedly threw grenades into the shelter.

Shapira managed to throw seven of the grenades back out, before being killed. During the attack on the shelter, Goldberg-Polin's arm was blown off from the elbow down. He reportedly managed to fashion himself a tourniquet for his injury. Surviving witnesses from the shelter confirmed they had seen militants abducting the wounded Goldberg-Polin and others on a truck. His family members report to have seen a video of Goldberg-Polin's actions leading up to him being taken hostage. The video reportedly ends with Goldberg-Polin seen getting into the back of a pickup truck; the traumatic amputation of his left arm, with exposed bone, can be seen as he turns to sit down. On 31 August 2024, his family confirmed his body was discovered by IDF.

== Media coverage and efforts to release ==
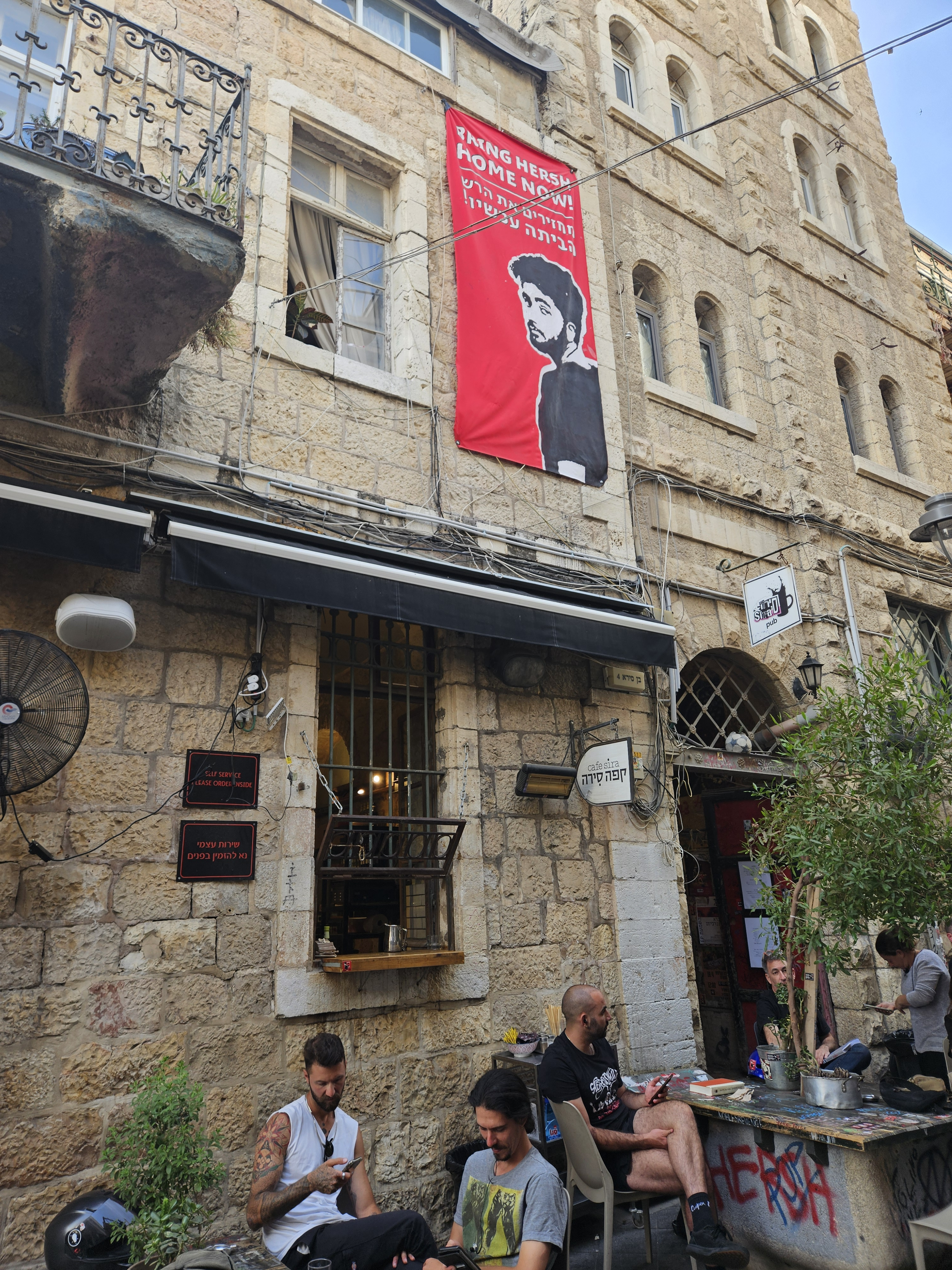
A sign in central Jerusalem calling for Hersh's release

Goldberg-Polin's family and friends launched a media and diplomatic campaign to secure his release. In late December 2023 it was reported that Goldberg-Polin's parents spoke to and petitioned a slew of politicians and others in regards to their son. They spoke to United Nations (UN) in New York and Geneva, Pope Francis, Elon Musk, President Joe Biden, US secretary Antony Blinken, 25 US senators, seven governors and multiple different celebrities and influencers. His mother took to wearing a shirt with a number taped on it each day, to track the days that he had been kept as a hostage.

On 24 October at the UN, Goldberg-Polin's mother, Rachel Goldberg, delivered an emotional speech imploring for the release of her son and the other hostages from Hamas: "Why is no one crying out for these people to be allowed access to the Red Cross? Why is no one demanding just proof of life? This is a global humanitarian catastrophe." Rachel also addressed the 14 November March for Israel in Washington, D.C., leading the crowd in a chant of "Bring them home now!" She asked, "Why is the world accepting that 240 human beings from almost 30 countries have been stolen and buried alive?"

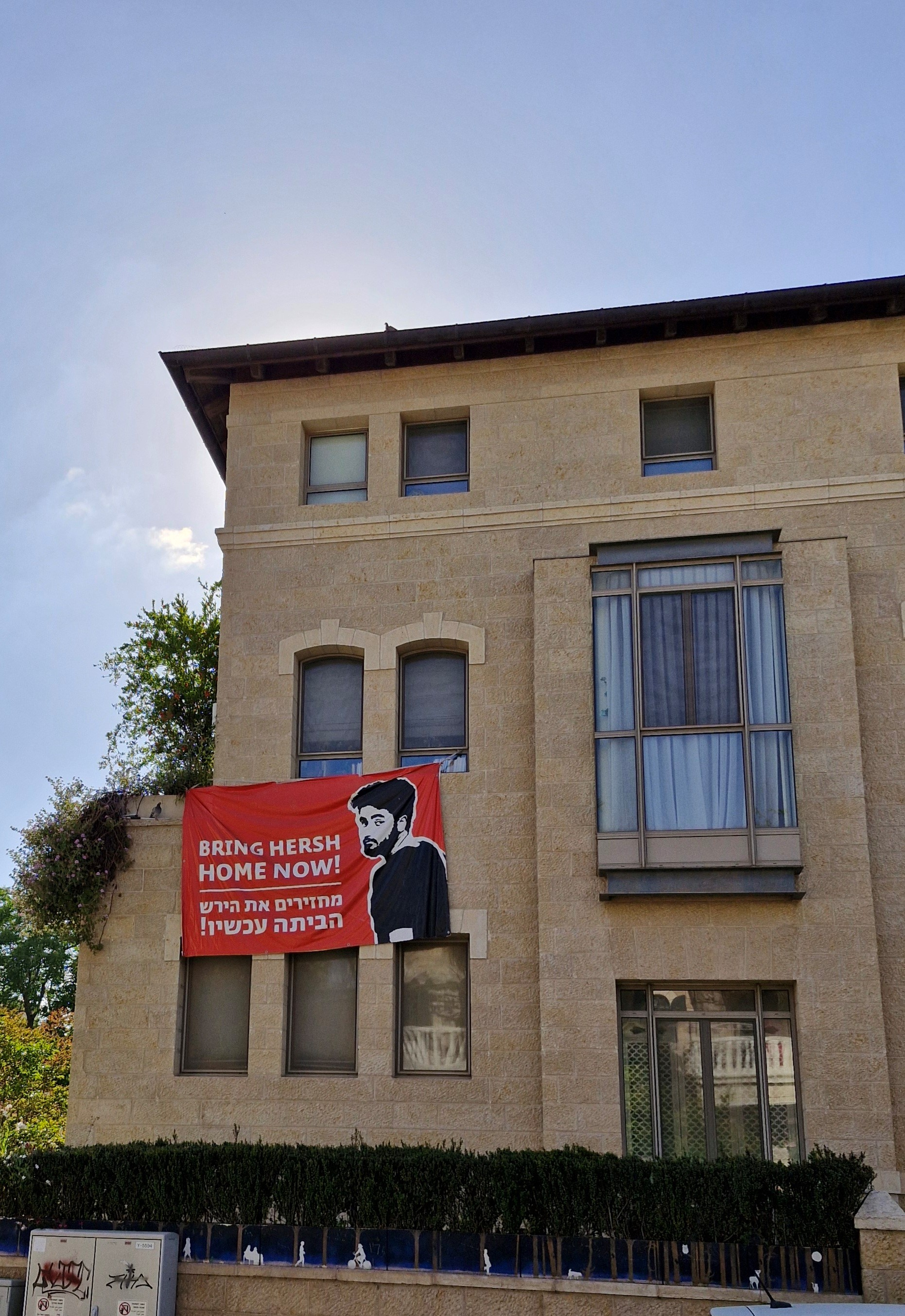
A Kidnapped from Israel banner hanging from a building in Jerusalem in May 2024

Goldberg-Polin was not released during the temporary cease-fire in late November 2023, which saw the exchange of 105 hostages taken by Hamas for the release of 240 Palestinian prisoners. Family members had met with Prime Minister Benjamin Netanyahu and the Israel war cabinet along with other hostages family members to petition to resume negotiations for a new cease-fire. On 27 December, when Goldberg-Polin was reportedly scheduled to start his world travel trip, his father and about 50 others gathered at the Ben Gurion Airport to bring attention to his continued captivity.

On 24 April 2024, Hamas released a nearly 3-minute-long video of Goldberg-Polin while in captivity. In it, he identifies himself, and says the Israeli government should be "ashamed" for "carrying their mission in Gaza" as the Israeli captives are stuck in an "underground hell with no food or water". Goldberg-Polin was filmed with an apparent healed amputation of his left arm, highlighting the injury he suffered during the Re'im music festival massacre. The video was not dated, but based on Goldberg-Polin stating he had been held captive for nearly 200 days, experts believe that the video was filmed recently to its airing. Following the video release his parents issued their statement, expressing joy at seeing and hearing him speak, but also imploring all the leaders working for a hostage deal to help bring him home. Experts say that filming such videos could be a war crime.

== Recovery of body ==
A screen capture from a video released by Hamas in which Goldberg-Polin is third from right. Hamas released the video after the recovery of the bodies of the hostages.

On 31 August 2024, Hersh's body was one of six bodies recovered from a Hamas tunnel in Rafah, Gaza. According to the Israeli health ministry, all six were executed by their Hamas captors from "close range" 1–2 days earlier. The IDF said that the captors were not present when its soldiers recovered the bodies.

An image of Goldberg-Polin from a video posthumously released by Hamas

Hamas initially denied executing Goldberg-Polin, as well as the five other hostages, claiming they died in an Israeli airstrike, without addressing the gunshot wounds claimed by Israel. On September 2, Hamas released a video of the hostages in which each one identified him/herself. The video concludes with a promise to release another video with the hostages' "last message". On September 5 Hamas released a video of Goldberg-Polin's last statement, the fourth out of the six hostages.

The same day that Hamas released the video of the six hostages, its spokesperson, Abu Obaida, posted a message on Telegram that following the rescue operation in Nuseirat "new instructions" were given to Hamas operatives guarding hostages regarding how to handle the situation in case the IDF gets near. Hamas also posted an image that included a statement in English and Hebrew:

"Military pressure = death and failure; hostage deal = freedom and life"

The image and the statements from Abu Obaida appeared to insinuate that the new Hamas policy will be to execute hostages if the IDF attempts to rescue them through military force, as opposed to a pause in fighting that allows for peaceful release of hostages. Israeli media therefore interpreted Hamas' statement as an admission to the execution of the hostages.

=== Burial ===
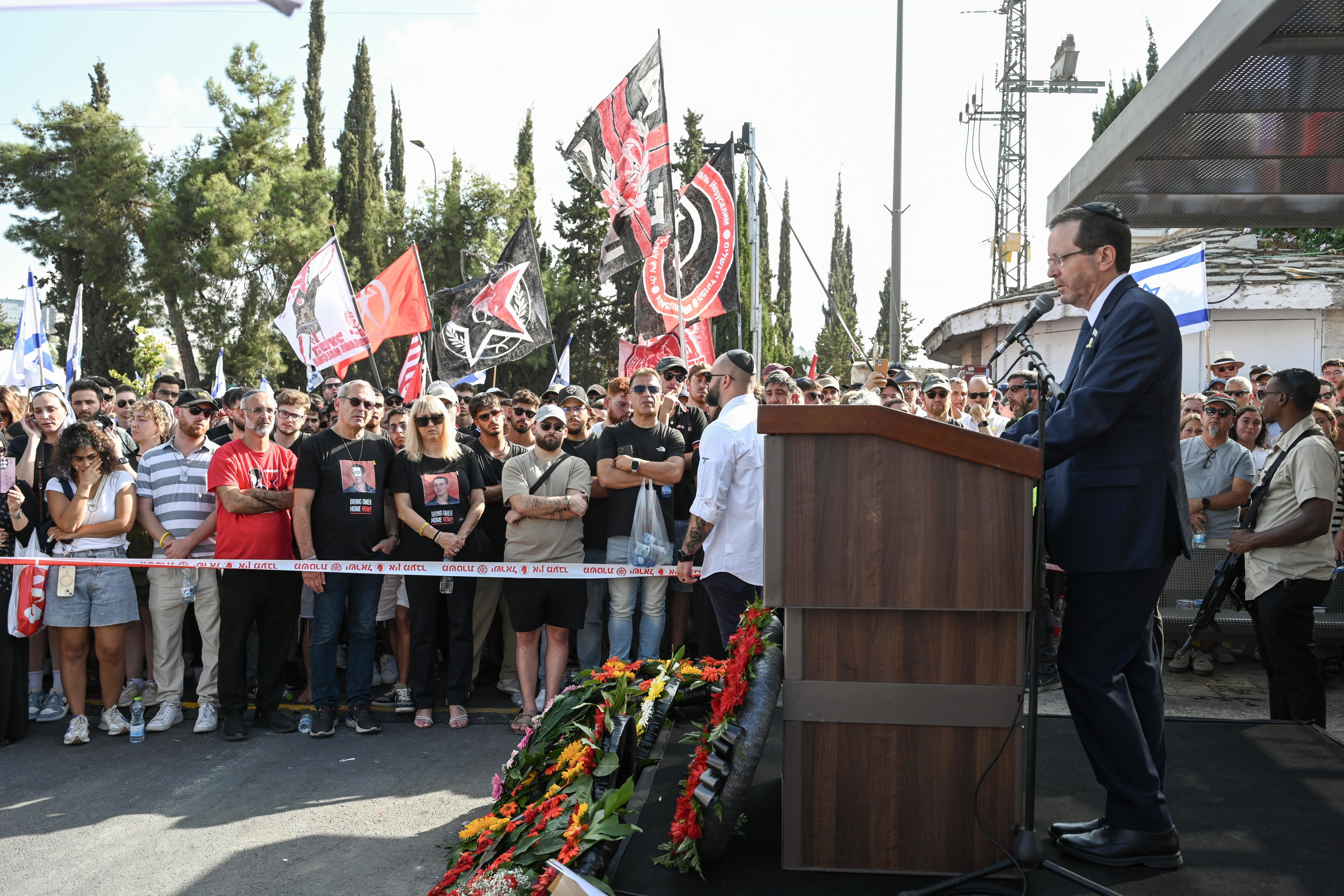
Israeli president Isaac Herzog speaking at Hersh Goldberg-Polin's funeral, September 2, 2024

Goldberg-Polin was buried at a cemetery in Jerusalem on September 2, 2024. Thousands of people attended the funeral, including the President of Israel, Isaac Herzog. With Goldberg-Polin having been a member of the Hapoel Jerusalem football club official fan club (the Malha Brigade), players from the team attended the funeral wearing their uniforms. Goldberg-Polin's mother eulogized him saying that it was a "stunning honor" to have had Goldberg-Polin as a son.

== Legal action ==
On September 3, 2024, the United States Department of Justice unsealed an indictment against five Hamas leaders: Yahya Sinwar, Mohammed Deif, Marwan Issa, Khaled Mashal and Ali Baraka, plus the deceased leader, Ismail Haniyeh. The indictment includes charges of terrorism, conspiracy to murder US nationals, and conspiracy to use weapons of mass destruction resulting in death. The indictments include the kidnapping and killing of Hersh Goldberg-Polin as well as the killing 42 other American citizens.

== Response ==
United States President Joe Biden, issued a statement in which he said:

Earlier today, in a tunnel under the city of Rafah, Israeli forces recovered six bodies of hostages held by Hamas. We have now confirmed that one of the hostages killed by these vicious Hamas terrorists was an American citizen, Hersh Goldberg-Polin. I am devastated and outraged. Hersh was among the innocents brutally attacked while attending a music festival for peace in Israel on October 7. He lost his arm helping friends and strangers during Hamas’ savage massacre. He had just turned 23. He planned to travel the world. I have gotten to know his parents, Jon and Rachel. They have been courageous, wise, and steadfast, even as they have endured the unimaginable... I know all Americans tonight will have them in their prayers, just as Jill and I will. I have worked tirelessly to bring their beloved Hersh safely to them and am heartbroken by the news of his death. It is as tragic as it is reprehensible. Make no mistake, Hamas leaders will pay for these crimes. And we will keep working around the clock for a deal to secure the release of the remaining hostages.

The news that Goldberg-Polin and the other 5 hostages were alive only a few days before the recovery of their bodies, along with reports that Goldberg-Polin and two of the other executed hostages were next on the list for release, triggered mass protests throughout Israel.

In October 2024, Goldberg-Polin's parents revealed that the office of Israeli Prime Minister Benjamin Netanyahu had reached out to them to speak with them after his funeral, but that they had declined. His parents stated that at the time they didn't know what to say to political decision-makers, certain rabbis, and other leaders who they felt had failed them in getting a hostage release deal before his death, but would come to them during shiva.

== Legacy ==
A banner with Goldberg-Polin's likeness outside Weserstadion, the home of SV Werder Bremen.

Goldberg-Polin, Carmel Gat, Eden Yerushalmi, Ori Danino, Alexander Lobanov, and Almog Sarusi were held together and coined as the "Beautiful Six." A joint memorial ceremony of prayer and song for the slain hostages was held a year after their deaths in August 2025. Footage of Goldberg-Polin and the five other hostages that he was held with, was spread by the Hostages and Missing Families Forum in December 2025. The footage in one video shows Danino lighting small candles balanced on cups while the group sings Shehecheyanu and other traditional songs to celebrate Hanukkah. Additional footage shows them playing cards with each other, counting down the new year, giving each other hair cuts and moving through the tunnels under Gaza.

=== Tributes ===
Goldberg-Polin was an avid fan of the German football club SV Werder Bremen. Both the team and its fans took up Goldberg-Polin's cause. Within three weeks after his abduction, fans of the team held up a large green banner reading "Always together" in Hebrew. They also held heart-shaped signs with name of the hostages. In July 2024, the club hoisted a green banner with Goldberg-Polin's picture along with the words "Let Hersh Free" outside their home stadium. Following news of his death, the club released a statement expressing its condolences.

== See also ==
- Bomb shelter massacres on October 7, 2023
- Gaza war hostage crisis
- Kidnapping of Noa Argamani, another hostage taken from the music festival
- Killing of Aysenur Eygi, another American citizen
- Killing of Shani Louk, who was also present at the music festival
- Killing of Tawfic Abdel Jabbar, another American citizen
- List of kidnappings
