= Ashlaa =

Arabic word for a severed limb

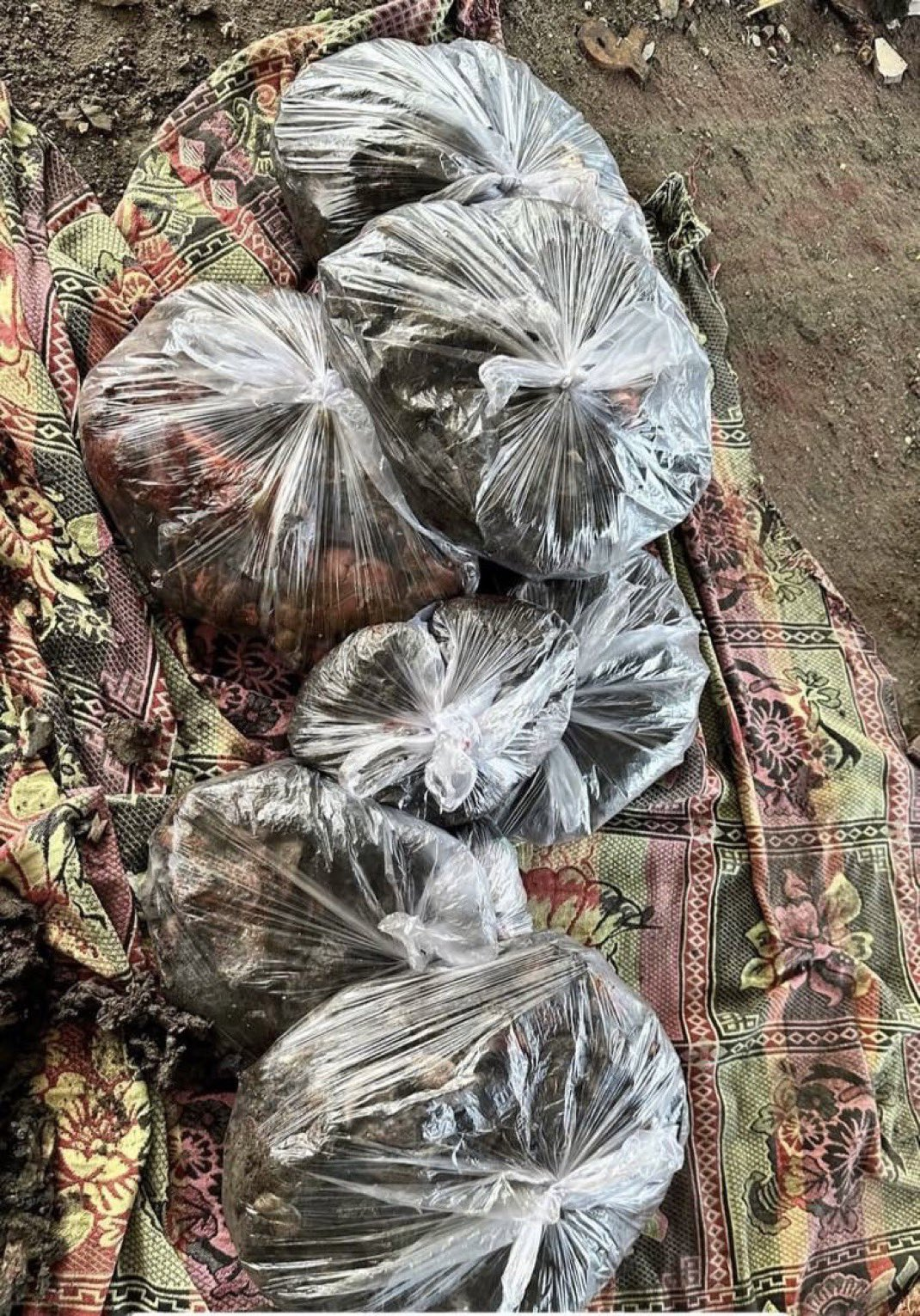
Charred ʾašlāʾ of victims of the Al-Tabaeen school attack (10 August 2024) collected in bags.

The Arabic word šilw (شلو), plural: ʾašlāʾ (أشلاء), means a "severed member (of the body); part torn off, fragment; remnant; stump of a limb."

The word ʾašlāʾ has been used to describe the severed limbs, dismembered flesh, and scattered body parts created by the Israeli bombing of the Gaza Strip in the Gaza genocide. Nadera Shalhoub-Kevorkian has made use of the concept of ʾašlāʾ in her theoretical critique of Zionism, arguing that it seeks not only to eliminate Palestinians but to "evict the already dead from humanity" and "prevent both Palestinians and Palestine from being whole." It has been used as a metaphor in relation to fragmentation in the Palestinian condition. Ghassan Abu-Sittah writes that "Following a missile attack, survivors try to collect the ashlaa’ of their beloved in order that, at least in death, they remain unaltered and undiminished; that they remain themselves."

Istanbul bureau chief for The New York Times Ben Hubbard, writing in 2017 as a Middle East correspondent for the newspaper, described the word ashlaa as an example of "the richness of the Arabic lexicon" within his discussion of what he called "The Linguistic Labyrinth of Arabic News."

== In popular culture ==
Ashlaa (أشلاء) is also the original Arabic title of Hakim Belabbes's 2010 documentary film In Pieces.

== See also ==
- Total body disruption – Acute destruction of the body
- Blowing from a gun – Execution method
