= Nadera Shalhoub-Kevorkian =

Law professor at Hebrew University of Jerusalem

- Title: former Lawrence D. Biele Chair in Law (Hebrew University of Jerusalem); Global Chair in Law (Queen Mary University of London)

Academic background
- Education: Hebrew University of Jerusalem

Nadera Shalhoub-Kevorkian (Hebrew: נדירה שלהוב-קיבורקיאן) is a feminist scholar whose work focuses on trauma, state crimes and criminology, surveillance, gender violence, law, and society and genocide studies. Born and raised in Haifa, Israel, and residing in Jerusalem, she is a noted Israeli-Palestinian feminist. She is the Global Chair in Law at Queen Mary University of London. She reportedly retired from her position at the Hebrew University of Jerusalem (HUJI) in late August 2024.

== Career ==
Shalhoub-Kevorkian grew up in Haifa. She received a Master of Arts degree in 1989 and a Doctor of Philosophy degree in 1994, both from Hebrew University of Jerusalem. Shalhoub-Kevorkian is the Global Chair in Law at Queen Mary University of London, and was until her 2024 resignation the Lawrence D. Biele Chair in Law at Hebrew University of Jerusalem, On October 22, 2024, it was announced that she would begin teaching at Princeton University as the Anthropology Department's Global South Visiting Scholar for the 2024-2025 school year. On May 12, 2025, that the Program in Gender and Sexuality Studies at Princeton University awarded Shalhoub-Kevorkian the Stanley Kelley Jr. Visiting Professorship for Distinguished Teaching for the 2025-2026 academic school year. Princeton University has confirmed that Shalhoub-Kevorkian's appointment as a visiting professor will conclude in July 2026.

== 2023– Gaza war ==
On March 12, 2024, Shalhoub-Kevorkian was suspended from the HUJI Faculty of Law following her remarks on Israel's Channel 14 news, where she accused Israel of genocide in Gaza and cast doubt on reports of sexual violence perpetrated by Hamas on October 7. The American Anthropological Association described an earlier letter, sent by the university in December 2023, as a threat to academic freedom and asked the university to retract. Philosopher and gender studies scholar Judith Butler wrote to the university leadership in support of Shalhoub-Kevorkian. Butler argued that it was the university's right to disagree with Shalhoub-Kevorkian on her view that the 2023 Israeli attack on Gaza constitutes genocide, but that the university leaders had an "obligation as representatives of a major research university to engage the debate, and to make room for an informed discussion of the matter free of threats". In a letter to Hebrew University, the Association for Civil Rights in Israel argued that Shalhoub-Kevorkian's comments: "while contentious, are protected under the right to freedom of expression, rendering her suspension an intolerable infringement upon academic freedom and constitutional rights." After Shalhoub-Kevorkian walked back her statements expressing doubts over the extent of Hamas' sexual assaults on October 7, the Hebrew University rescinded her suspension.

On April 18, 2024, Shalhoub-Kevorkian was arrested following an interview, where she raised doubts about sexual and gender crimes committed by Hamas on October 7, 2023. Police confiscated books and posters from her home and questioned her on previous academic publications. According to her lawyer, Shalhoub-Kevorkian was strip-searched and held in painful conditions without access to food, water, or medications, in a cold cell without adequate clothing or blankets. She was released on bail the next day after it was ruled that she did not pose a threat. More than 100 faculty members from Hebrew University published an open letter backing her and criticizing the university for not offering their support, describing the arrest as a political act against freedom of expression. The university later condemned the arrest, emphasizing that in a democratic country, there is no place to arrest a person for their remarks, regardless of their controversial nature. More than 250 academics at Queen Mary University of London also signed a letter in support of Shalhoub-Kevorkian and called on the university to stand by her.

Minister of National Security Itamar Ben-Gvir celebrated her arrest and in June the Knesset whip Ofir Katz introduced a proposal for a law which would terminate the careers of lecturers who expressed anti-Zionist views, which in Shalhoub-Kevorkian's case would, if approved, cancel her rights to her earned pension, savings, and salary. The move was strongly protested in June in an open letter by a coalition of feminist scholars throughout the world.

In late August 2024, Shalhoub-Kevorkian was reported to have resigned her position at Hebrew University without making a public statement about the reasons for her decision.

In late October 2024, several months after her resignation from Hebrew University, Princeton University announced that she was appointed as the Global South Visiting Professor for the Anthropology Department. In May 2025, the Program in Gender and Sexuality Studies announced that they had awarded the Stanley Kelley Jr. Visiting Professorship for Distinguished Teaching to Shalhoub-Kevorkian for the 2025-2026 academic school year.

Since October 2024, Shalhoub-Kevorkian's scholarship has focused on the concept of ʾašlāʾ (أشلاء 'dismembered body parts') in her theoretical critique of Zionism as a metaphor for fragmentation in the Palestinian condition, arguing that Zionism seeks not only to eliminate Palestinians but to "evict the already dead from humanity" and "prevent both Palestinians and Palestine from being whole."

At Princeton, she teaches courses in the Program in Gender and Sexuality Studies, including the Spring 2025-2026 course, "Gender, Reproduction, and Genocide," which examines genocide through feminist and decolonial frameworks with a focus on Gaza. The appointment and course received substantial media coverage from multiple outlets including Fox News and Turning Point USA. Commenting on the scandal, Princeton referred Fox News Digital to a letter by its president, Christopher L. Eisgruber, about the school's commitment to academic freedom and stated that her visiting professor appointment is scheduled to conclude in July 2026.

== Select prizes and honors ==
- 2024 Americans For Middle East Understanding/John and Sharon Mahoney Award for Service
- 2020 Impact Award, International Network of Genocide Scholars (INoGS)
- 2017 Radzinowicz Prize for the Best Article Published in 2016, The British Journal of Criminology
- 2016 Claire Goldberg Moses Prize for the Most Theoretically Innovative Article Published in Feminist Studies
- 2015 Honoree of the Harvard Law School's Second Annual International Women’s Day Celebrations, organized by the Harvard Women's Law Association and Harvard Law and International Development Society
- 2014 Radzinowicz Prize for the Best Article Published in 2014, The British Journal of Criminology
- 2011 International Scholarship Prize for Distinguished Work in the Field of Law and Society, Law and Society Association
- 2008 International Women's Rights Prize, The Peter and Patricia Gruber Foundation
- 2008 Golda Meir Fellowship, The Hebrew University of Jerusalem
- 2000 Dean's Letter of Commendation for Teaching Excellence, The Hebrew University of Jerusalem
- 1999 Ellis and Alma Birk Scholars Prize, The Hebrew University of Jerusalem
- 1998 Arab-Israeli Award for Pioneering Scholars, The Arab Students Committee for Higher Education
- 1994 Dean’s Letter of Commendation for Teaching Excellence, The Hebrew University of Jerusalem

== Selected works ==
- Shalhoub-Kevorkian, Nadera (2019). Incarcerated Childhood and the Politics of Unchilding. Cambridge University Press. ISBN 978-1-108-42987-0.
- Shalhoub-Kevorkian, Nadera (2015). Security Theology, Surveillance and the Politics of Fear. Cambridge University Press. ISBN 978-1-316-30059-6.
- Shalhoub-Kevorkian, Nadera (2009). Militarization and Violence Against Women in Conflict Zones in the Middle East: A Palestinian Case-Study. Cambridge University Press. ISBN 978-0-521-88222-4.
