= 2024 Al-Jawni School attack =

Bombing of a Gaza school by Israeli forces

- Part of the Gaza war
- Location: Nuseirat refugee camp, Gaza Strip
- Date: 11 September 2024
- Target: UN-run Al-Jawni school
- Attack type: Airstrikes
- Deaths: 18+ people (including 6 UNRWA staff)
- Injuries: 44+ people
- Perpetrator: Israel Defense Forces

On 11 September 2024, the Israel Defense Forces bombed the UN-run Al-Jawni school in the Nuseirat refugee camp of central Gaza. The school had been sheltering people displaced by the Israeli invasion of the Gaza Strip, including women and children. Per rescuers, 18 people were killed and more than 44 others were wounded. Among the killed were six United Nations workers, including the manager of the UNRWA shelter. This made it the highest death toll for UN staff in any single incident of the Gaza war and raising the number of UNRWA staff killed since the beginning of the war to 220. The IDF said that at least nine of the people killed were Hamas operatives. The attack was one of a number of attacks on schools during the Israeli invasion of Gaza and the fifth bombing of the Al-Jawni School since October 2023.

== Background ==
On 6 July, UNRWA-run al-Jawni school sheltering 2,000 refugees at the Nuseirat refugee camp in central Gaza was targeted by an IDF raid which killed sixteen Palestinians. On 7 July, the IDF targeted the Latin Patriarchate-owned Holy Family school located in Gaza City housing hundreds of refugees, killing four. On 8 July, IDF force struck a different Nuseirat UNRWA-run school in, causing several injuries requiring treatment in a local hospital. Philippe Lazzarini, the head of UNRWA, stated two-thirds of all UNRWA schools in Gaza had been hit since October 2023. According to the UNRWA, Al-Jawni school had been used as a polio vaccination center only a week before it was attacked by the IDF.

A United Nations Security Council Resolution adopted on 25 March 2024 had demanded an immediate ceasefire in the Gaza war.

== Attack ==
The IDF targeted the UN-run Al-Jawni school in Nuseirat refugee camp with two airstrikes, killing at least 18 people, including six UNRWA staff who had just stopped for a lunch break after distributing food aid to local Palestinians. Witnesses reported that "women and children were blown to pieces" in the assault. The Israeli military stated that the attack was "a precise strike on terrorists who were operating inside a Hamas command-and-control centre". Israel claimed that at least nine of the people killed - including three of the UNRWA staff - were members of Hamas, while the UNRWA asserted that all of its staff killed by the IDF were in fact teachers.

According to the UN, an estimated 12,000 displaced people, most of them women and children, were sheltering at the school at the time of the attack. A Palestinian woman reported losing all of her six children in the attack, stating "all of a sudden there was a huge explosion... women and children were blown to pieces. We rushed to see our children but found them torn to pieces". A man reported "we don’t have any resistance fighters here, none of them enter the school. Look around, it’s all food aid" and that "the people who were distributing the aid are the ones who died, civilians. We are all civilians here who are dying".

== Reactions ==
UN secretary-general António Guterres called Israel's actions in Gaza "totally unacceptable". In a social media post, World Food Programme head Cindy McCain stated her organization was "devastated" by the loss of their six UN colleagues, and that such attacks were "absolutely unacceptable" and needed to stop. UNRWA Commissioner-General Philippe Lazzarini denounced what he called the "endless and senseless killing, day after day", and reported that "humanitarian staff, premises and operations have been blatantly and unabatedly disregarded since the beginning of the war". Israel responded that "it is unconscionable that the UN continues to condemn Israel in its just war against terrorists".

European Union foreign policy chief Josep Borrell said that he was "outraged" by the killing of UNRWA staff and condemned the constant "disregard for the basic principles of international humanitarian law" by Israel. Qatar condemned the attack as a "horrific massacre" and called for an independent UN investigation into the attack. David Mencer, a spokesperson for the office of Prime Minister of Israel, Benjamin Netanyahu, said the school was "no longer a school" and had become "a legitimate target" and that it contained a "Hamas command and control center".
