= Eylon Levy =

British-born Israeli government spokesman

- אילון לוי
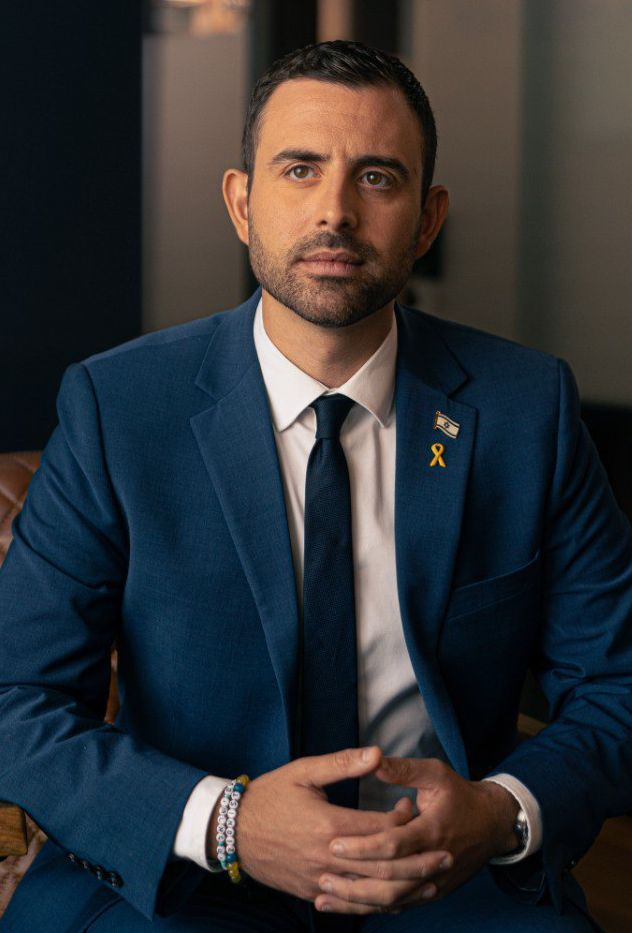
- Born: Eylon Aslan-Levy; 1991 (age 34–35); London, England
- Citizenship: Israel; United Kingdom
- Education: University of Oxford; University of Cambridge
- Known for: Israeli government spokesperson

Eylon Aslan-Levy, (Hebrew: אילון אסלן-לוי) is a British-Israeli figure who served as the Israeli government spokesman from the start of Gaza war until March 2024, when he was suspended due to complaints from the UK government about his public criticism of their stance toward Israel and the war. Levy continues his public advocacy work, with a podcast partly-sponsored by the Ministry of Diaspora Affairs and Combating Antisemitism. He also visits Jewish diaspora communities around the world with organizations such as the Jewish National Fund and StandWithUs.

Levy was born in London, United Kingdom. He attended University College School in London and University of Oxford, where he received his bachelor's degree in Philosophy, Politics, and Economics in 2013. He moved to Israel in 2014 at the age of 23 to join the Israeli military during the 2014 Gaza War. In 2016, Levy began work as the chief news anchor at IBA News, and then later presented news at i24NEWS.

== Early life and education ==
Levy was born in London, United Kingdom to Israeli emigrant parents who worked in real estate, and is of Iraqi-Jewish ancestry. He began participating in debate clubs at age 14. Levy attended University College School in London, before going onto Brasenose College at the University of Oxford, where he received his bachelor's degree in Philosophy, Politics, and Economics in 2013. While studying at Oxford, he participated in debate championships around the world. In 2013, he notably participated in a debate with George Galloway in which Galloway walked out after learning that Levy was an Israeli citizen. In his final year at Oxford, he also co-wrote A Theory of Justice: The Musical, a satirical musical comedy adapting John Rawls's A Theory of Justice; premiering in 2013, it was performed at the Edinburgh Festival Fringe later that year and at a London West End production in 2018, and was nominated for numerous awards.

He received his master's degree in International Relations from the University of Cambridge, where he wrote his thesis on the issue of Jewish refugees from the Arab world in Israeli foreign policy. While at Cambridge, Levy ran unsuccessfully to become President of the Cambridge Union Society. He moved to Israel in 2014 at the age of 23 to enlist in the Israeli military during the 2014 Gaza War, and served in the Coordinator of Government Activities in the Territories (COGAT) unit.

== Career ==
=== 2010s ===
In 2014, Levy published a column for The Guardian newspaper, "Obsessive Gaza coverage is fanning antisemitism". Levy complained about what he estimated to be disproportionate media coverage of Israel, claiming that it fuels antisemitism in Europe. Levy also condemned accusations of genocide against Israel and those that invoke the Holocaust to criticize the country. He has contributed to Tablet, The Tower Magazine, and The Daily Telegraph. Since 2013, he has been contributing blog posts to The Times of Israel.

In 2016, Levy worked as the chief news anchor at IBA News, the English-language broadcast on Israeli public television. He later worked at the international news network i24NEWS, as a news anchor, commentator, and investigative journalist. In 2021, Israeli President Isaac Herzog appointed him as his international media advisor at the Office of the President of Israel, in which capacity he served for the first two years of the Herzog presidency.

=== Gaza war ===
After the October 7 attacks in 2023, Levy became an official Israeli government spokesman and one of Israel's most internationally recognized faces in the war. Mark Regev had encountered Levy in the public diplomacy directorate, recognizing his potential and setting him work tasks. As training, he was instructed to observe Regev's live interviews and then give his own interviews.

==== Nasrallah speech ====
During the early stages of the conflict, Eylon Levy encountered a diplomatic setback characterized by a press conference response to Hezbollah leader Hassan Nasrallah. Levy remarked with what Levy described as "dark British humour" that Nasrallah's speech was so boring that Israel probably had assassinated Nasrallah's speechwriter. Levy also noted that Nasrallah was not onstage during the address, such that the Hezbollah leader must have been "hiding in a bunker like a coward" as he was defending what Levy termed "the pedophile rapists of Hamas".

The Public Diplomacy Directorate of the Office of the Prime Minister of Israel deemed the comments a diplomatic failure. The directorate contemplated removing Levy as international media spokesperson, but in the end granted him a second opportunity with guidance from higher authorities who emphasized the inappropriate nature of his response as a government spokesperson. Levy acknowledged the lapse, recognizing that, in his role, humour was not the primary objective but rather conveying information seriously and professionally.

==== Hostage vs. prisoner numbers ====
On 23 November 2023, he was interviewed on Sky News by Kay Burley who said: "I was speaking to a hostage negotiator this morning, and he made the comparison between the 50 hostages that Hamas has promised to release as opposed to the 150 prisoners that are Palestinians that Israel has said it will release,". Burley continued: "He made the comparison between the numbers and the fact that does Israel not think that Palestinian lives are valued as highly as Israeli lives?"

Levy received widespread support from the Jewish community for his response: "That is an astonishing accusation. If we could release one prisoner for every one hostage, we would obviously do that.“ Burley's remarks led to many complaints to Ofcom, Britain's government-approved regulatory and competition authority for broadcasting. It was the fifth most-complained about TV broadcast of 2023. The Times of Israel praised Levy for his interview performance, writing that Levy is “energized, assumes a Sphinx-like expression and delivers an impressive barrage of well-reasoned, well-crafted arguments.”

==== Sexual and gender-based violence ====
In November 2023, host Lewis Goodall of radio show LBC questioned Levy about his tweet labelling protestors at pro-Palestinian protests in London, where pro-Hamas signs have been present, as "rape apologists". Levy made the comments in the context of Sexual and gender-based violence in the October 7 attacks. Levy replied that he challenged anyone offended by the term to hold up a sign at a pro-Palestine march with the sentence "I condemn Hamas for raping Israeli women and girls".

==== Genocide case ====
In January 2024, as government spokesperson, Levy condemned South Africa's genocide case against Israel, stating that his country would fight the case "to dispel South Africa's absurd blood libel". He claimed that South Africa is complicit with Hamas and is "playing the role of devil's advocate because of its criminal complicity with the bloodiest massacre of Jews since the Holocaust, and [Israel] will judge it without mercy."

=== Suspension ===
==== Sara Netanyahu ====
On January 22, 2024, the Times of Israel and the Jerusalem Post reported that Sara Netanyahu, wife of the current Israeli prime minister Benjamin Netanyahu, tried to oust Levy from his spokesperson role for participating in the 2023 Israeli judicial reform protests before the Israeli war on Gaza. Levy's posts on X (Twitter) had reportedly circulated among persons in the prime minister's inner circle and upset some of them. Sara Netanyahu's endeavor to dismiss Levy aroused significant public outcry over what was seen as her overreach. The Movement for Quality Government in Israel promptly petitioned the government's legal advisor, urging the issuance of guidelines delineating the specific domain within which she is authorized to intervene in and unjustly or illegally influence governmental affairs. Later that day it was reported that Sara Netanyahu had reprimanded Israel's Ambassador to the UK Tzipi Hotovely for praising Levy whom Hotovely called a "wonderful public diplomacy star", with Sara Netanyahu denying having done so. At the same time it was reported that Levy would be allowed to stay on as an international spokesman, but that his media appearances would be less frequent.

According to a Channel 12 report on January 21, 2024, officials opted to reduce Levy's public appearances promptly, with a complete removal from the position anticipated within the following few weeks, while the official rationale behind this decision would be stated to be the government's expressed aim to project a more diverse image to the international media.

==== UK Government ====
In March 2024, he engaged in an online row with UK Foreign Secretary David Cameron. Levy said in response to a tweet from Cameron urging Israel "to allow more [aid] trucks into Gaza":

"I hope you are also aware there are NO limits on the entry of food, water, medicine, or shelter equipment into Gaza, and in fact the crossings have EXCESS capacity. Test us. Send another 100 trucks a day to Kerem Shalom and we'll get them in."

Cameron disputed Levy's claims that there were "no limits" on the entry of aid into Gaza, and that the Kerem Shalom border crossing into Gaza was closed on Saturdays because of the UN, in a letter addressed to MP Alicia Kearns: “The main blockers remain arbitrary denials by the Government of Israel and lengthy clearance procedures, including multiple screenings and narrow opening windows in daylight hours.”

Levy was suspended after the UK Foreign Office expressed "surprise" to Israel's foreign ministry and sought clarification on whether his tweets represented the Israeli government's official position. A report in the Financial Times paraphrased the UK's query as: "Is this the way allies speak to each other?"

By his estimate, between October 7, 2023, and March 2024, Levy had participated in 270 interviews across the mediums of television, radio and podcast. He has also led fifty press conferences and gave seventy briefings to delegations. After leaving his position as a spokesperson, he was replaced by David Mencer.

=== Post-suspension ===
==== Podcast ====
After suspension,Levy founded the State of the Nation podcast in which he interviews guests about Israel, antisemitism, and Jewish history. The podcast is partly funded by the Ministry of Diaspora Affairs and Combating Antisemitism and the initiative is supported by the Minister, Amichai Chikli. He has also founded the New Israeli Discourse public advocacy project and Israeli Citizen Spokespersons Project, which aim to support independent non-governmental Israeli advocacy and activism in support of Israel. The project raised more than $300,000 in less than a week.

==== Public speaking ====
In September 2024, he embarked on a public diplomacy speaking tour in Australia for the Jewish National Fund Australia. He engaged with over 5, 000 members of Australian Jewry in Sydney, Melbourne and Perth. Months prior to his tour, he was interviewed by Australia's SBS Hebrew. In October and November 2024, he addressed Jewish communities in Toronto, Montreal, Vancouver and Calgary with StandWithUs.

On 31 October 2024, he gave a lecture at the University of Calgary, sponsored by StandWithUs. 200 pro-Palestinian protestors attempted to disrupt the lecture, chanting "From the river to the sea" and accusing Levy of genocide. The lecture was cut short by campus security over safety concerns, and students evacuated through a hidden back entrance. Levy was harassed by protestors on the way to his car. Levy condemned the "hateful extremism" of the protestors, but added that he was "pleasantly surprised" by the number of non-Jewish students that attended his lecture, describing them as "genuinely curious and empathetic." On 5 November, Levy spoke at Congregation Shaar Hashomayim in Montreal. 40 masked pro-Palestinian protestors gathered outside the synagogue. The protestors were condemned in a joint declaration by the Federation CJA and Centre for Israel and Jewish Affairs.

In March 2026, Levy said that he was owed money by Israel's national public diplomacy directorate, but had grown tired of trying to get it and would not be participating in a lawsuit filed against the directorate by unpaid hasbara activists.

==== Honors ====
In April 2024, Levy appeared on the cover of the weekly newspaper, The Jewish Journal of Greater Los Angeles with the cover headline "Mr Hasbara".

=== Translation and other work ===
As a Hebrew-to-English literature translator, Levy has translated several influential works of Hebrew non-fiction. In 2022, he was named the inaugural translation finalist of the Sami Rohr Prize in recognition of his translation of Danny Adeno Abebe's memoir From Africa to Zion. Among his previously published works:

- Catch-67 by Micah Goodman (New Haven, CT: Yale University Press, 2018)
- #IsraeliJudaism by Shmuel Rosner and Camil Fuchs (Jerusalem: JPPI, 2019)
- The War of Return by Einat Wilf and Adi Schwartz (New York: St. Martin's Press, 2020)
- Shimon Peres: An Insider's Account by Avi Gil (London: I.B. Tauris, 2020)
- The Story of Secular Jews by Amnon Rubinstein (Tel Aviv: Kotarim, 2021)
- The Wondering Jew by Micah Goodman (New Haven, CT: Yale University Press, 2021)
- From Africa to Zion by Danny Adeno Abebe (Tel Aviv: Yediot Books, 2021)
- The Israeli Century by Yossi Shain (New York: Wicked Son, 2021)
- The Fifth Fiasco by David Passig (Newcastle: Cambridge Scholars Press, 2021)
- Frayed by Yair Ettinger (New York: Koren Publishers, 2023)
- Hostage by Eli Sharabi (HarperCollins, 2025) A wider internationa

Levy was the co-creator of the musical comedy A Theory of Justice: The Musical, which premiered in Oxford in 2013 and was revived for the Edinburgh Fringe Festival, where it was nominated for four awards.

== In popular culture ==
=== Eyebrow incident and memes ===
The eyebrow incident on Sky News, 23 November 2023

On 23 November 2023 TV, Sky News anchor Kay Burley interviewed Levy during which she asked him whether Israel's plan to release 150 Palestinian fighters in exchange for Hamas freeing only 50 Israeli hostages, one Israeli for every three Palestinians, implied that Israel perceived Palestinian lives as inferior. Levy raised his eyebrows dramatically in apparent disbelief at the question and stayed silent for a moment, then replied that Burley's accusation was "astonishing", continuing "If we could release one prisoner for every one hostage, we would obviously do that". Clips of Levy raising his eyebrows went viral on social media. The next day on X (Twitter) Levy expressed further frustration, and then joked "my eyebrows are tired".

Since the eyebrow incident, Levy has been portrayed in other video clips, memes, sketches and other expressions of popular culture. These include a humorous parody of the typical Israeli accent on an American podcast and a video where he facetiously apologizes to those he accused of supporting Hamas, asserting that they were, in reality, merely "indifferent" to the organization's atrocities.
