= Mohamed Cherkaoui (sociologist) =

Moroccan sociologist (born 1945)

Mohamed Cherkaoui was born in 1945 in Boujad.

== Biography ==
He is an emeritus research director at the CNRS. He has conducted several research studies on education systems in Europe, the United States, and Morocco, as well as on inequalities and social mobility. Since the beginning of the 2000s, he has focused his work on the Islamization of Muslim societies in Morocco, and particularly in the Sahara.

Mohamed has continued his studies on the history and classical theories of sociology, particularly on Max Weber and Emile Durkheim to whom he devoted several of his works. He carried out a large study on social science research in Morocco (2004-2009) and was appointed on January 4, 2010 as a member of the Consultative Commission on Regionalization (CCR) by King Mohammed VI. Cherkaoui was the former director of the Revue Française de Sociologie, a member of the editorial boards of several international journals, and he directed a collection at Bardwell-Press.

He studied philosophy, sociology, and statistics at Sorbonne, and has obtained his doctorate in letters and human sciences in 1981 at the Paris-Sorbonne University. He has taught at several universities, especially at Sciences Po Paris, and at the universities of Paris IV, Paris V, Oxford, Lausanne, Geneva, Rabat, and Casablanca.
