= Shmuel Rosner =

Israeli journalist and editor

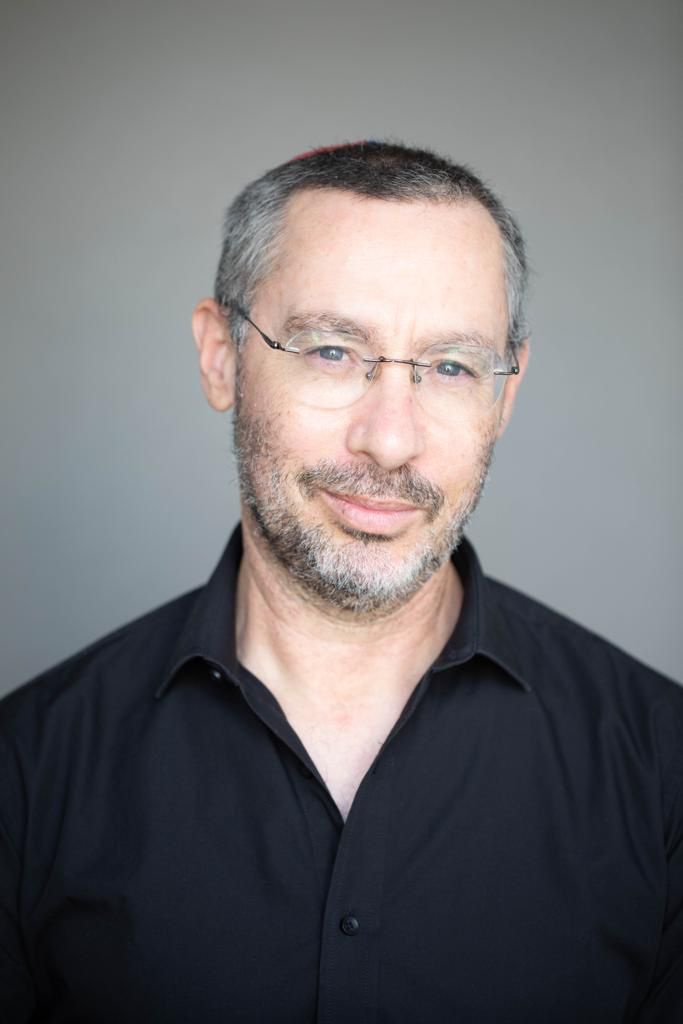
Shmuel Rosner

Shmuel Rosner (Hebrew: שמואל רוזנר) is a Tel Aviv based columnist, editor and think tank fellow. He is currently a Senior Fellow at The Jewish People Policy Institute (JPPI) in Jerusalem, as well as an analyst for Kan News TV (Israel’s public television). He is the founder and editor of the data-journalism initiative themadad.com, the founder and editor of the nonfiction imprint "The Hedgehog and the Fox", and writer of a weekly column for The Jewish Journal in L.A. and for Maariv in Israel.

== Biography ==
Rosner was previously a columnist for the International New York Times (2011-2021); the chief non-fiction editor for Israel’s largest Publishing House, Kinneret-Zmora-Dvir (2009-2021); a columnist for The Jerusalem Post (2008-2011); Chief U.S. Correspondent, Head of the News Division and Head of the Features Division for the Israeli daily Haaretz (1996-2008). He wrote for many magazines, including Slate, Foreign Policy, Commentary, The New Republic, The Jewish Review of Books, and others.

Rosner’s published four books:

- Shtetl Bagel Baseball, on the Wonderful Dreadful State of American Jews was published in Israel by Keter (Hebrew, 2011)
- The Jewish Vote: Obama vs. Romney, A Jewish Voter’s Guide was published in the US (Jewish Journal Books, 2012)
- The Jews, 7 Frequently Asked Questions was published by Dvir (2016)
- #IsraeliJudaism, Portrait of a Cultural Revolution was published by Dvir (Hebrew, 2018) and JPPI (English, 2019).

=== Career in Book Editing ===
Rosner is an editor known for “discovering” Yuval Noah Harari. Rosner published Harari’s two first books in Hebrew prior to his international success. "I contacted four, five publishers who didn't want it”, Harari said, “the editor Shmuel Rosner was enthusiastic, and said we would go for it. And the rest is history".

Rosner published many other successful non-fiction authors in Israel, both local writers and foreign writers whose books he bought for translation, including Micah Goodman ("Catch 67" and all of his other works), Matti Friedman ("Pumpkinflowers" and others), Nassim Nicholas Taleb, Daniel Kahneman, Dan Ariely, Sean Carol, Malcolm Gladwell, Einat Natan ("My Everything" and others), Tali Sharot, Ronen Bergman and many more.

In 2022 Rosner established a "boutique books and ideas" project named "The Hedgehog and the Fox". Through this initiative, he produces a cultivated podcast and book series that focus of science, history, foreign affairs and philosophy.

== Selected articles ==
- Israel's Fair Weather Fans, New York Times, Aug. 7, 2014.
- "What America can learn from Israel's West Bank security barrier". Slate. June 6, 2006.
- "Hamas, isolate or engage?". Council on Foreign Relations. May 11, 2006.
