= Yassir Znagui =

Moroccan politician (born 1970)

Royal Adviser
- Incumbent
- Assumed office 6 December 2011
- Monarch: Mohammed VI

Minister of Tourism
- In office 4 January 2010 – 6 December 2011
- Monarch: Mohammed VI
- Prime Minister: Abbas El Fassi
- Preceded by: Mohamed Boussaid
- Succeeded by: Lahcen Haddad

Personal details
- Born: 1970 (age 55–56) Tangier, Morocco
- Party: National Rally of Independents
- Occupation: Politician, Businessman

Yassir Znagui (born 1970 in Tangier, Morocco) is a Moroccan businessman and politician. He was Minister of Tourism between 2010 and 2011 in the government of Abbas El Fassi. He is currently an adviser to King Mohammed VI.
