= Fahmi al-Jarjawi School attack =

Israeli airstrike in Gaza City

- Part of the Gaza war
- A small girl attempts to escape fires lit by the Israel Defense Forces bombing of the al-Jarjawi school.
- Location: Daraj, Gaza City, Gaza Strip
- Date: 25 May 2025
- Attack type: Airstrikes, school bombing
- Deaths: 36+, including 18 children
- Injuries: 55+
- Perpetrator: Israel Defense Forces

On 25 May 2025, the Israel Defense Forces (IDF) targeted the Fahmi al-Jarjawi School in Daraj, Gaza City, killing at least 36 people and wounding 55 others, including 18 children and six women. The attack occurred in the midst of mounting international criticism of Israel's conduct in the Gaza war. Many children were killed, and verified video footage showed a young girl trapped in the fires caused by the bombing, trying to escape. Children surviving the attack suffered from severe burns.

The Israeli military had not ordered people to evacuate the area prior to the bombing. Israeli claims about the targeting of militant forces in the school were without evidence and could not be verified by news organizations.

The attack occurred in the context of the May 2025 Gaza offensive, accompanied by hundreds of bombings, sieges of hospitals, starvation, forced displacements across the territory, and bellicose threats from Israeli Prime Minister Benjamin Netanyahu.

== Background ==
In response to mounting international criticism, Israeli Prime Minister Benjamin Netanyahu said that Israeli forces would increase their attacks across the Gaza Strip until they controlled it completely. The military push has accompanied a blockade of medical and food supplies. Al Jazeera noted strikes that hit other schools and shelters in the war; these included the killing of over 50 people at the al-Buraq School in November 2023, and of over 100 people at the al-Tabaeen School in August 2024.

In the two days leading up to the bombing, the Israel Defense Forces (IDF) said that its air force had attacked over 200 locations in Gaza, including "terrorists, weapons depots, sniper and anti-tank positions, tunnel shafts", among others. Families sought refuge in the Fahmi al-Jarjawi School in the Daraj neighborhood of Gaza City from Israeli air attacks. According to Mahmud Bassal, spokesperson for Gaza's Civil Defense, the al-Jarjawi School was sheltering hundreds of people, most of them women and children. Israeli military forces did not order an evacuation of the area prior to the attack.

The military escalation preceding the bombing of the Fahmi al-Jarjawi School is associated with Operation Gideon's Chariots (Hebrew: מבצע מרכבות גדעון), a plan by the Netanyahu government to seize control of all of Gaza. Military sources told The Guardian that the bombings of schools were a deliberate Israeli policy, which loosened "controls on actions targeting Hamas operatives at sites with large numbers of civilians present", including when sites might contain: "only low-ranking militants".

== Bombing ==
The strikes that hit the school killed between 33 and 36 people according to the Associated Press (AP), Al Jazeera, and Agence France-Presse (AFP), and wounded 55. The Guardian and the BBC wrote that 54 were killed while sleeping at the school.

Gaza's government media office said that 18 children were killed in the bombing. Al Jazeera published verified video footage of a small child in the burning school, attempting to escape from the fires. Outside, people desperately tried to break windows to save those burning inside the school. The BBC reported severe burn injuries to children.

Paramedics reported massive fires sweeping through the school and tents pitched on its grounds. They stated they could hear voices of people trapped alive in the fires but unable to escape. Witnesses described the scene as "catatrophic", and one local resident said the bombing "was like an earthquake". Civil Defense forces fought to put out the fires for hours. One paramedic, who rescued a small girl in the flames, said: "We could not bring ourselves to inform her that her entire family had been killed in the bombing".

Al Jazeera reported that on the morning of the bombing, 50 people had been killed altogether in attacks by Israeli forces across northern Gaza. These attacks included the killing of 19 people in a single home, including 17 members of the Abd Rabbo family. Rescue workers were shelled by Israeli forces as they attempted to rescue survivors of the attacks.

From footage of the debris, weapons experts have determined the Boeing manufactured GBU-39 Small Diameter Bomb was used in the attack.

== Aftermath ==
=== Conflict ===
After the attacks, Israeli forces dropped leaflets urging Gazans to inform on Hamas fighters, stating: "We have sealed Hamas's fate, the war is nearing its end". Israeli forces issued evacuation orders for most of the southern Gaza Strip.

Satellite imagery showed that Israeli forces established sieges against remaining operational hospitals in northern Gaza.

=== Girl ===
A small girl seen escaping the flames was later identified as five-year-old Hanin al-Wadie. She survived the airstrike on the school but lost both her parents and younger sister. She sustained second- and third-degree burns and was later found receiving treatment at al-Ahli Arab Hospital.

Her uncle arranged her evacuation to Jordan as no hospital in Gaza was capable of providing her the required treatment.

== Reactions ==
=== Human rights organizations ===
The United Nations Relief and Works Agency for Palestine Refugees in the Near East (UNRWA) issued a statement that places for shelter in Gaza were overwhelmed by displaced people seeking relief, and that no place was safe. A United Nations (UN) report released after the bombing found that 95% of schools in Gaza had been damaged, and 400 struck with a "direct hit".

UNWRA's director of communications, Juliette Touma, said:

"Very sadly, schools have been struck over and over for the past 20 months. It’s a grave violation of international law and of children’s rights."

=== Governments ===
==== Gaza ====
Gaza's government media office stated that the bombing was "a direct extension of the crime of ethnic cleansing and genocide" being carried out against the Palestinian people since the October 7 attacks. The office said that Israeli forces had systematically bombed shelters to cause the maximum number of casualties possible.

==== European Union ====
In a transcript of a call between Ursula von der Leyen, head of the European Commission (EC), and King Abdullah II of Jordan, she called the bombing of the school "abhorrent".

==== Israel ====
The Israeli Defense Forces (IDF) and Shin Bet stated without evidence that the school was used by "terrorists to plan and gather intelligence" to attack Israeli civilians and soldiers. The Israeli military said it had taken steps to avoid harming civilians and had targeted key figures in Hamas and Palestinian Islamic Jihad (PIJ). BBC reporters were unable to verify Israel's claims, and video footage and images showed dozens of women and children killed and injured. Israeli spokesmen did not state which people, specifically, it intended to kill in the bombings. Military sources told The Guardian that additional schools in northern Gaza, including Halawa, Nusiba, al-Raff'i, and Halima Sa'dia had been designated as "potential targets".

In response to criticism of Israeli military conduct by opposition leader Yair Golan, in +972 Magazine, wrote:

"To suggest Israel is committing war crimes in Gaza is hardly a radical claim... The nine children of the Al-Najjar family, or those burned alive in Gaza’s Fahmi Al-Jarjawi school following an Israeli airstrike — these are the most recent flesh-and-blood evidence of this brutal reality."

==== Germany ====
While Germany's Chancellor criticized the Israeli government. Germany's Foreign Minister, Johann Wadephul, stated that Germany would continue selling weapons to Israel.

== See also ==
- Al-Tabaeen school attack
- Al-Farabi School Bombing
- Attacks on schools during the Israeli invasion of Gaza
- Israeli war crimes in the Gaza war
- Gaza genocide
- Outline of the Gaza war
- Timeline of the Israeli–Palestinian conflict in 2025
