= Kay Burley =

English broadcaster (born 1960)

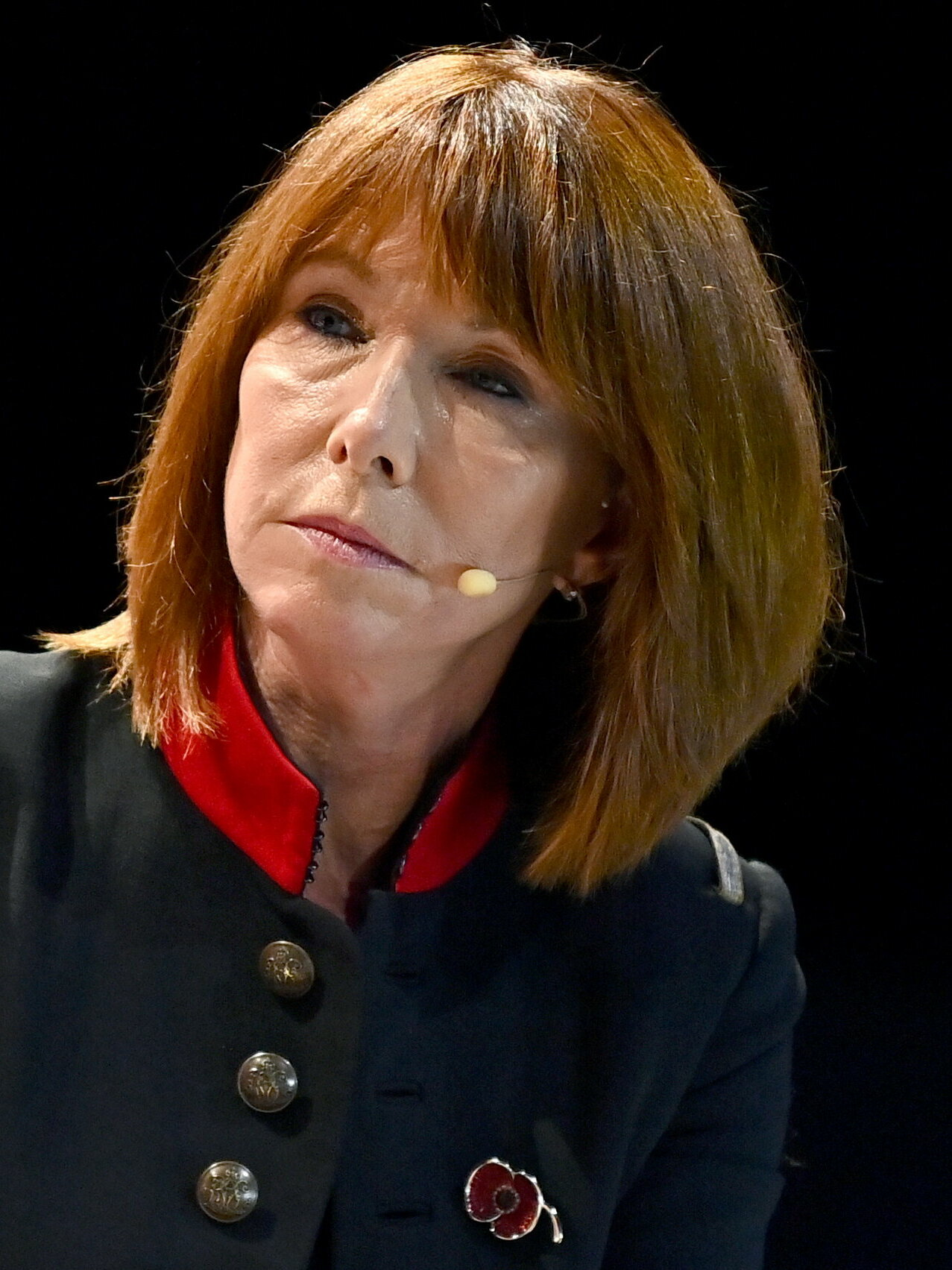
- Burley in 2021
- Born: Kay Elizabeth McGurrin; 17 December 1960 (age 65); Wigan, Lancashire, England
- Occupations: Broadcaster; writer
- Notable credits: TV-am; Sky News
- Spouse(s): Steve Burley (m. 1980, divorced), Steve Kutner (m. 1992, divorced)
- Partner: George Pascoe-Watson (c. 2004 – 2009)

Kay Elizabeth Burley (née McGurrin; born 17 December 1960) is an English broadcaster. She was a presenter on Sky News and hosted the breakfast slot on the channel. She has also worked for BBC Local Radio, Tyne Tees Television, and TV-am.

Over her 36-year career at Sky News, Burley covered some of the biggest domestic and international stories, conducted countless political interviews, and anchored numerous special events. Her live coverage of the September 11 attacks on the World Trade Center and the Pentagon earned Sky News a BAFTA award. She also covered 12 general elections for Sky News throughout her career, including anchoring the overnight coverage for Keir Starmer's victory in 2024.

On 5 February 2025 it was announced that Burley was leaving Sky News after 36 years.

== Early life ==
Born on 17 December 1960, Burley was brought up at Beech Hill in Wigan, Lancashire, the daughter of parents who worked in a cardboard-making factory. She attended Whitley High School (closed 1990).

She began her reporting-career at age 17, working for the Wigan Evening Post and Chronicle.

== Broadcasting career ==
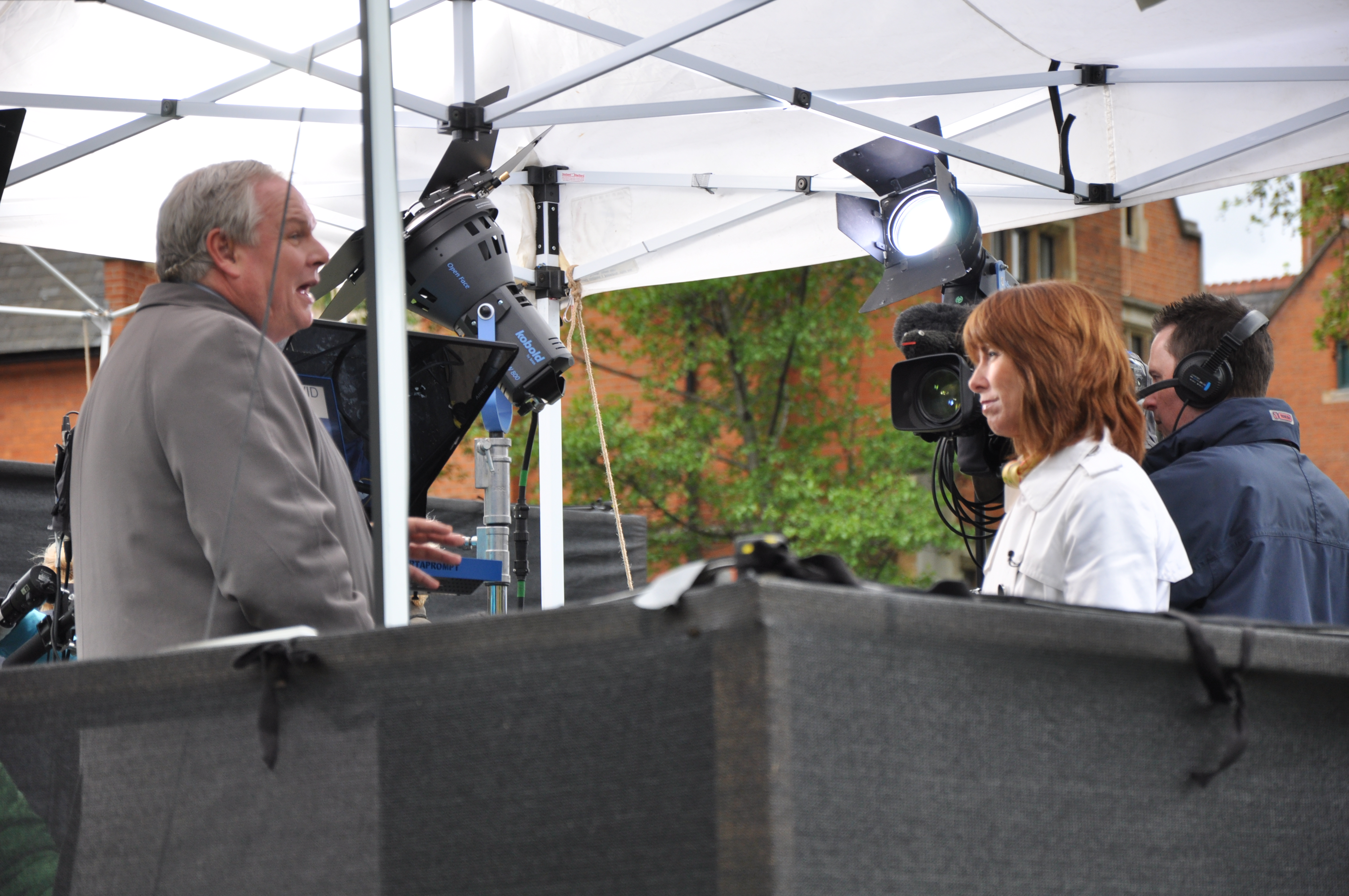
Burley presenting Sky News with Adam Boulton during the 2010 general election

Burley worked for BBC local radio and Tyne Tees Television, before joining TV-am in 1985 as a reporter and occasional newsreader. From 1987, she presented TV-am's first hour, filling in for Caroline Righton and covering for Anne Diamond during their maternity leave.

Burley was recruited by Andrew Neil, and joined Sky Television, launching the Sky One Entertainment Channel in November 1988 with her own documentary, The Satellite Revolution. She moved to the fledgling Sky News in 1988.

She was part of the team that covered the death of Diana, Princess of Wales, on Sky, breaking the news of the princess's death shortly after 5 a.m. on Sunday 31 August 1997. She broke the first UK news of the September 11 attacks, shortly after the first tower had been hit. She fronted Sky News coverage from Sri Lanka following the 2004 Indian Ocean earthquake and subsequent tsunami. In 2005, she was prominent in Sky News's coverage of both the general election and the wedding of Prince Charles and Camilla Parker Bowles. In 2013, she fronted the coverage of the birth of Prince George.

Burley is an occasional contributor to the tabloid Sunday Mirror, and in the summer of 2006 appeared occasionally on Channel 5's news bulletins. She has stood in for Iain Dale on his Sunday Politics show on London talk radio station LBC 97.3 and joined LBC Radio on 23 March 2014 along with The Sun's managing editor Stig Abell to present a show from 8 to 11 a.m. on Sundays.

Burley was a contestant for the second series of the ITV reality television show Dancing on Ice, beginning on 20 January 2007. She skated for MacMillan Cancer Care, in memory of her mother, who had died of breast cancer. She gave her appearance fee to the charity. Burley and her partner, Fred Palascak, went out of the show in the fifth week, after competing against actress Clare Buckfield and her partner, Andrei Lipanov. She appeared on the second series of Celebrity Hunted, in 2018.

In September 2018 it was announced that she would have her own show on Sky News, The Kay Burley Show.

In September 2019 it was announced that she would be moving to breakfast time to host Kay Burley @Breakfast. On 3 October 2019, Burley hosted her final afternoon show on the channel ahead of the first morning slot on 14 October 2019.

On 10 December 2020, Burley was suspended from presenting her eponymous show for six months, because she had breached London's tier 2 coronavirus restrictions. Before then, she had scrutinised those who had broken the rules over the previous six months. On 7 June 2021, Burley returned to the channel with a simple greeting, "it's great to be back", before reporting the news headlines.

On 5 February 2025, Sky News announced that Burley was leaving the channel after 36 years.

== Notable incidents ==
=== 2008–09 ===
In a 2008 interview with the former girlfriend of serial killer Steve Wright, Burley was criticised for asking her whether, if the couple had enjoyed a better sex life, he would not have committed the crimes.

Images from 2008 showed Burley appearing to strangle photographer Kirsty Wigglesworth, outside a court hearing for Naomi Campbell, who was sentenced for assaulting two police officers at London Heathrow Airport. A Sky News spokesperson explained, "Kay Burley was provoked by a hard hit to the face with a camera." But the Associated Press said, "Kirsty is absolutely sure that she's not the person who bumped Ms Burley with a camera. She was the victim of an unprovoked and inexcusable attack."

=== 2010–11 ===
In February 2010, Burley apologised to guest Peter Andre who "fought back tears" after she aired comments by Dwight Yorke who criticised Andre after he volunteered to adopt Katie Price's first child (Yorke's son and Andre's stepson) Harvey. Burley wrote in her online blog that Andre consequently "sobbed on my shoulder".

During the 2010 general election, Burley's interview with electoral campaigner David Babbs from 38 Degrees was criticised for "bias and aggressive behaviour". Burley said, in part:

The public have voted for a hung parliament. We have got exactly what we voted for ... so you marching down past Westminster today will make no difference whatsoever. ... Why don't you go home and watch it on Sky News?

Ofcom rejected any complaints over Sky News coverage of the event, despite receiving 2,800 complaints. Burley was subsequently heckled by protestors while reporting from College Green, who continuously chanted "sack Kay Burley", prompting Burley to say "Lots of demonstrators shouting 'fair votes now' – not sure what they mean by that" and "They don't like The Sun, they don't like us, they don't like Rupert". In September 2010, commenting on the News International phone hacking scandal, part of an exchange between Labour MP Chris Bryant and Burley went viral, whereby Burley asks Bryant to cite information claiming that phone hacking was "endemic" in other newspapers. Bryant did, accusing Burley of being "a bit dim" and saying:

...the Information Commissioner produced a report which if you had listened to the debate earlier yourself then you would know, or if you had read that report then you would see that he referred to more than 1,000 cases in various different newspapers. I think it was something like 800 – I've not got the figures with me now – 800 incidences in the Mail alone.

Burley also falsely claimed that if he had changed his PIN, Bryant would not have been hacked. Bryant responded in an article for The Independent, saying that "My PIN had nothing to do with my phone being hacked. Someone phoned Orange, my mobile network provider, and tried to pretend to be me in order to gain access to my voicemails". Bryant has since asked on air for Burley to apologise about the interview.

=== 2012–2015 ===
On 5 October 2012, Burley was accused of insensitivity after she broke the news of the probable death of missing five-year-old April Jones live on air to volunteers who had been assisting in the search for her. The interviewees were unaware that the case had become a murder inquiry.

=== 2015–present ===
During the 2015 general election, Channel 4 and Ofcom received more than 400 complaints against bias in their treatment against Labour leader Ed Miliband in favour of Conservative leader and Prime Minister David Cameron, including a "town hall" part of the programme which Burley moderated. Burley repeatedly questioned Ed Miliband about his relationship with his brother David, at one point telling him: "Your poor mother".

In June 2015, Burley was criticised through social media for her interview of Nick Varney, the chief executive of Merlin Entertainments. This followed an accident on The Smiler ride at Alton Towers, which led to injuries for 11 of the 16 passengers. Responses to her behaviour dubbed it "disrespectful to everyone involved" and an "outright attack". In response, Burley tweeted "For those concerned I was hard on Alton Towers boss, he'll get over it. Not sure those on his ride will be so quick to recover". Her interview with Varney began a negative reaction over social media, prompting 1,816 complaints to Ofcom and also led to over 55,000 signatures on a petition to have Burley sacked. Ofcom declined to launch a formal investigation into the interview.

In March 2015, Burley repeatedly asked Cerie Bullivant of CAGE how he felt about the beheading of Western hostages by the Islamic State of Iraq and the Levant. When Bullivant left the interview as he believed Burley's question to be "inherently Islamophobic and racist", Burley retorted that it was "nonsense", and told Bullivant to "get over yourself". This prompted 57 complaints to Ofcom, but no action against Burley was taken.

In 2018, during an interview concerning Boris Johnson's remarks about the burqa, Burley drew criticism when she used as an example the lack of visible facial expression of war veteran Simon Weston, who had received severe facial injuries in the Falklands War.

In December 2020, Burley admitted to breaching London's tier 2 coronavirus restrictions when celebrating her 60th birthday. Her actions allegedly included meeting up to nine individuals outside of her household, breaking the 11pm curfew, and socialising inside two restaurants and her own home. Burley was later suspended from Sky News until June 2021, and withdrawn from consideration for the Royal Television Society's journalism awards.

In October 2023 Sky News issued a retraction after Burley misquoted Palestinian Ambassador to the United Kingdom Husam Zomlot multiple times as saying "Israel had it coming" which gave a misleading impression that he believed they deserved it. Her false claims resulted in 1,537 Ofcom complaints.

Burley was criticised in November 2023 when, during an interview with Israeli spokesperson Eylon Levy, she asked what he thought of a hostage negotiator's claim that Israel values Israeli lives disproportionately to that of Palestinian lives. Burley later issued a statement stating that she "raised a controversial view from an earlier guest to allow another to respond", emphasising a mission to fairly present the news of the war.

In July 2026, while interviewing an Epstein survivor and discussing the involvement of Andrew Mountbatten-Windsor, Burley stated, "we should accept that he (Mountbatten-Windsor) is a war-hero." This led to widespread criticism online.

== Writing ==
Burley's first novel, First Ladies, was published on 12 May 2011. The book is an erotic romance set in the media industry, including television news. One reviewer called it a "turgid mess" which is not even bad enough to be good: "Unfortunately, this book, with its dire comic timing, complete absence of irony, pointless digressions, dull plotting and complete lack of any engaging characters, is so mind-numblingly, fist-chewingly awful, that it's just bad."

Another Burley novel, Betrayal, was published in May 2012.

== Personal life ==
Burley married Steve Burley in 1980 but later divorced. She married Steve Kutner in 1992 in Antigua. The couple had one son, born in 1993 and separated in 1994. She had a five-year relationship with George Pascoe-Watson, who was the political editor of The Sun.

In 2018 Burley participated in Channel 4's Celebrity Hunted and was captured in the penultimate episode.

In an interview with The Telegraph in 2019, Burley said she was a keen climber and mountaineer.

Burley is a Roman Catholic.
