= Al-Farabi School bombing =

Israeli School Bombing in Gaza City

- Part of the Gaza war
- A small girl killed by the Israel Defense Forces strike of the al Farabi school.
- Location: Gaza City, Gaza Strip
- Date: 7 September 2025
- Attack type: Airstrikes, school bombing
- Deaths: 8+, including several or more children
- Perpetrator: Israel Defense Forces

The Al-Farabi School Bombing occurred in the early morning hours of September 7, 2025, in a southwestern part of Gaza City, near the al-Yarmouk Stadium. The attack killed eight people including several children in the school, which was being used as a shelter. A witness reported that the strike was carried out using two rockets.

It was the second attack by Israeli forces killing sheltering civilians at the Al-Farabi School in 2025; the first occurred in January.

== Background ==
The attack came in the midst of an ongoing offensive against Gaza City by the Israel Defense Forces. In the days prior to the school bombing Israeli forces escalated their attacks by destroying high rises, shelters, apartments, and mosques. The day before the strike, Israeli military officials told Gazans to leave Gaza City and flee south.

Israeli officials announced plans to occupy Gaza City.

== Attack ==
Speaking to Reuters, a relative of one of the casualties said that everyone in the school was sleeping at the time of the attack, and added, "These are the innocent children they claim are 'wanted.' Come and see for yourself. I do not even know what to say. What was the fault of these children?" One survivor of the strike described multiple children being injured and killed by the blasts, which buried people under concrete and rubble. Another witness said that multiple rescue teams working in the rubble had found body parts of children in the aftermath of the attack.

== Responses ==
A spokesperson for the Israeli military told Reuters that the civilians in the school were warned prior to the attack, and that the strikes killed a Hamas militant.

== See also ==
- Fahmi al-Jarjawi School attack
- Al-Tabaeen school attack
