= Al-Tabaeen school attack =

Israeli airstrike on Gaza school

- Part of the Gaza war and Gaza genocide
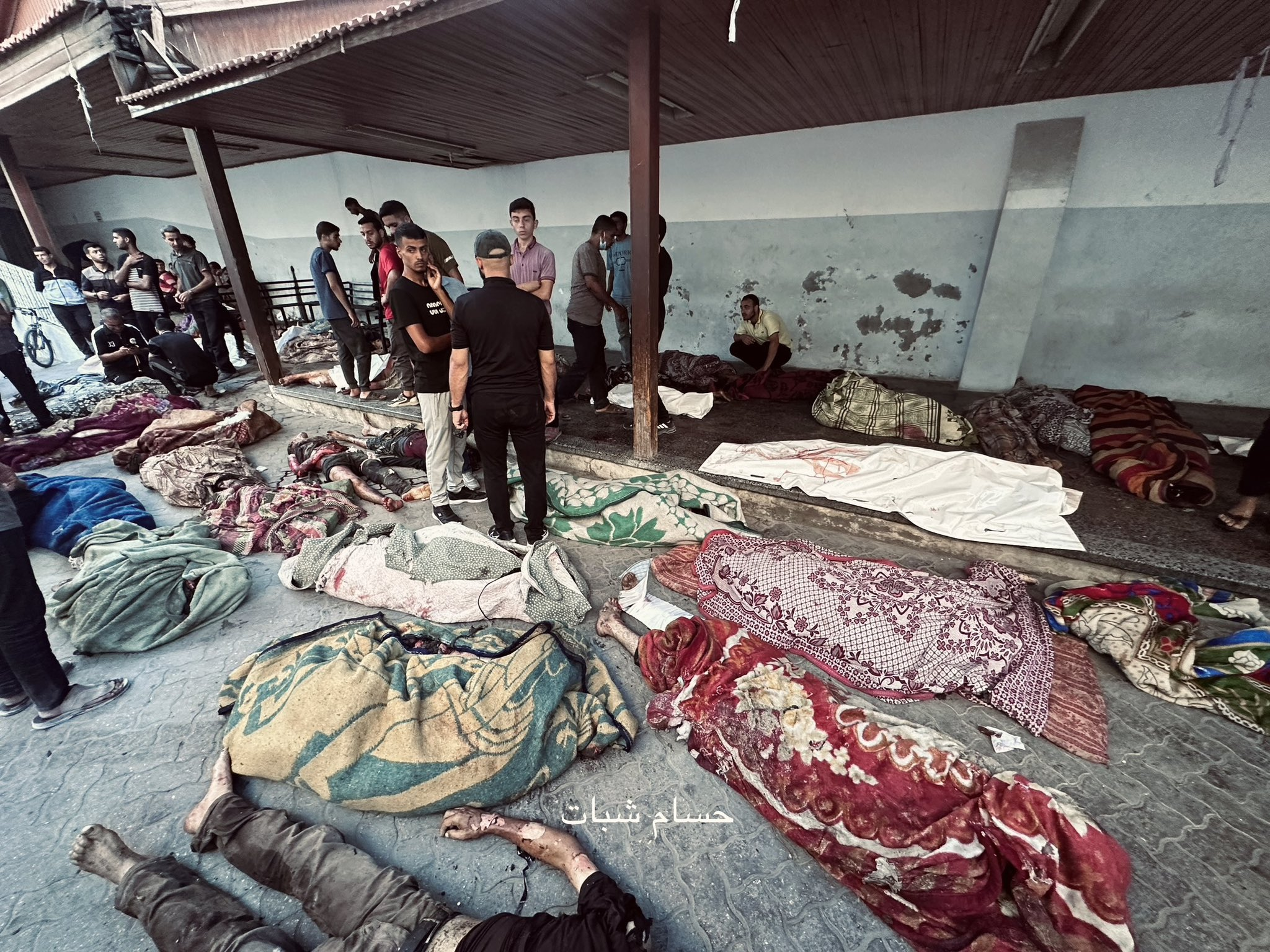
- The aftermath of the airstrike

- Location within the Gaza Strip
- Location: Gaza City, Gaza Strip
- Date: 10 August 2024
- Target: Mosque inside Al Tabaeen school
- Attack type: Rocket strikes
- Weapon: GBU-39 Small Diameter Bomb
- Deaths: 80–93+ Palestinians
- Injuries: 47 Palestinians
- Perpetrator: Israel Defense Forces

On 10 August 2024, Israel struck the Al-Tabaeen school located in eastern Gaza City, which was hosting displaced Palestinians seeking shelter there during the Gaza war. According to Palestinian health authorities, at least 80 Palestinians were killed and 47 others were injured, with several victims being trapped in the school as the fire spread. The IDF said that these numbers were inflated.

At around 4:40 during Fajr morning prayers in the Al-Tabaeen school, which was being used to house roughly 6,000 refugees and internally displaced Palestinian citizens, three rockets struck the building, causing the structure to collapse. Consequently, a fire broke out that caused several more casualties. Attempts by rescue workers and other civilians to reduce the spread of the fire and save the lives of trapped civilians were seriously impeded due to the Israeli military cutting off the region's water supply.

It was the fifth attack on a school in a week and the UN Human Rights Office said it was "horrified by the unfolding pattern" of attacks on schools. An Al Jazeera investigation found that the bombing was deliberately performed to result in maximum casualties. The IDF said that the school "contained 31 Hamas and PIJ terrorists" and was being used as a "Hamas headquarters". Additionally they stated that they had taken steps to prevent harm to civilians. Analysing the IDF's official explanations, the Israeli investigative journalist Meron Rapoport said that "the army bombed a populated shelter knowing full well the deadly repercussions its assault would inflict". A CNN weapons expert identified shrapnel evident in footage from the aftermath of the attack as coming from a GBU-39 manufactured by the US-based Boeing.

== Background ==
The attack happened amidst negotiations for the three-phase ceasefire proposal between Israel and Palestinian factions. It was the fifth attack on a school in a week and the eighth in the month of August. The UN Human Rights Office said it was "horrified by the unfolding pattern" of attacks on schools.

== Attack ==
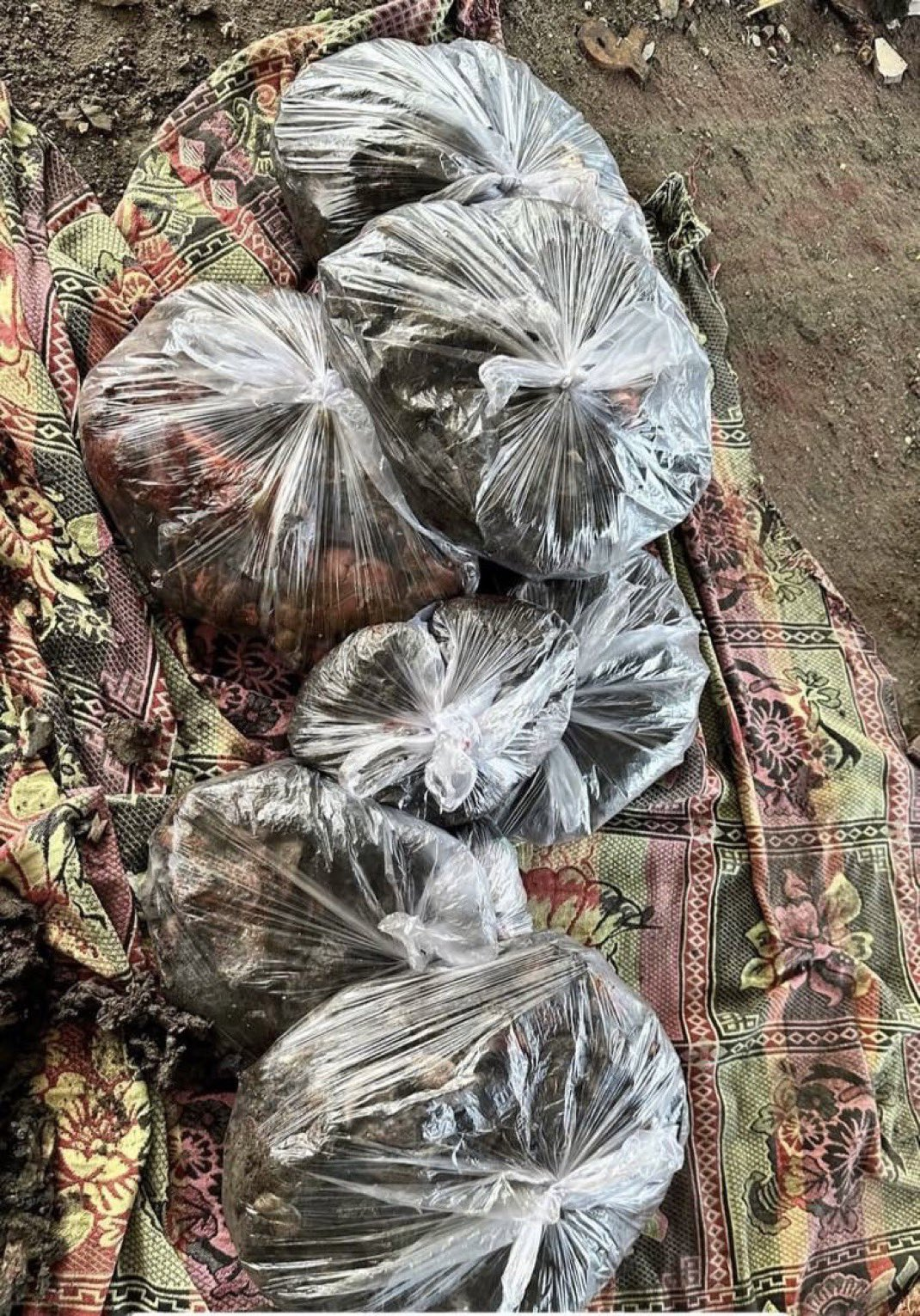
Bags of charred, dismembered body parts, called ashlaa (أشلاء) in Arabic, of victims of the Al-Tabaeen school attack

At around 4:40 during Fajr morning prayers in the Al-Tabaeen school, which was being used to house roughly 6,000 refugees and internally displaced Palestinian citizens, three rockets struck the building, causing the structure to collapse. According to witnesses, no warning was given prior to the attack. The number of Palestinians in the school was higher during the attack due to it occurring during Fajr prayer, with eyewitnesses stating that roughly 250 people were inside the prayer hall at the time of the strikes.

Due to the impact of the rockets, a fire started that caused several more casualties from victims who survived the initial blast but were trapped in the rubble and debris. Rescue workers who arrived at the scene and attempted to put out the blaze were unable to free several of those trapped under the wreckage before they were overcome by the spreading smoke and fire, which reportedly included whole families. Attempts by rescue workers and other civilians to reduce the spread of the fire and save the lives of trapped civilians were seriously impeded due to the Israeli military cutting off the region's water supply. Footage from the attack showed body parts strewn across the ground.

== Casualties ==
The director of the Al-Ahli Arab Hospital said that at least 80 Palestinians were killed. The Gaza Health Ministry stated that 47 were injured. A regional director for Save the Children called it the deadliest attack on a school since October 2023. The Palestinian Civil Defence said that 11 children and six women were among the victims, and elderly civilians were also reported to be among the victims of the disaster. The Gaza Civil Defense stated some bodies were unidentifiable due to their bodies being "torn and charred by the bombardment." A man who rushed to the scene stated that the "smell of burnt flesh filled the air, with body parts scattered around." The IDF said that these numbers appeared to have been inflated.

The IDF and Shin Bet initially released the names of 19 people, and later a further 12, that they said had been killed in the strike and alleged that they were Hamas and Palestinian Islamic Jihad (PIJ) militants. Additionally, they accused the Gaza Health Ministry of inflating the death toll. As soon as the initial list of 19 was published, it immediately began to be disassembled by analysts and commentators. According to an on-site investigation conducted by the Euro-Mediterranean Human Rights Monitor (EMHRM), which examined the list against the Israeli-controlled civil register, Israel recycled three names of alleged militants, one of whom, Ahmed Ihab al-Jaabari, had been killed on 5 December, and two of whom, Youssef al-Wadiyya and Montaser Daher, had been killed a few days earlier in different areas of Gaza. The list also included the names of three elderly civilians with no military affiliations, namely Abdul Aziz Misbah al-Kafarna, a school principal, and Yousef Kahlout, an Arabic teacher and deputy mayor of Beit Hanoun. Among six other civilians, EMHRM further stated that some were known opponents of Hamas. Al-Haq, and surviving relatives of other fatalities have also contested Israel's accusations. One survivor of the attack stated: "This war is against us, the civilians, through and through." Hamas released a statement "categorically denying" that there were any armed men at the school.

Casualties received at the Al-Ahli Arab Hospital received shrapnel injuries from the explosives that caused profuse bleeding, while other survivors suffered from severe burns caused by the fire following the initial explosions. Due to the sudden influx of casualties in addition to the lack of staff and medical supplies, healthcare workers at the hospital were unable to provide necessary aid while the hospital system was pushed to the "brink of collapse". Patients were reportedly kept in hallways due to a lack of beds. Paramedics and relatives of those killed struggled to identify bodies due to the remains being in small pieces.

== Investigation ==
Preliminary investigation performed by the Euro-Med Monitor found no evidence of the presence of militants or military equipment in Al-Tabaeen school. The human rights group concluded the very structure of the building, with its narrow layout, would have made it "impossible for the site to be used for military operations".

Al Jazeera’s verification branch, Sanad, determined that the bombing was deliberately performed to result in maximum casualties. According to Sanad, Israel fired two guided missiles at the mosque at the time of dawn prayers, penetrating the women’s chapel on the first floor and exploding in the men’s chapel below. The fact that the attack was carried out just as prayers were beginning ensured that a large number of civilians would be killed. Fire also broke out in areas that were not directly attacked by Israel, killing and maiming civilians. A fact check by Al Jazeera further cast doubt on Israel's list of 31 "terrorists" killed in the attack.

A CNN weapons expert identified shrapnel evident in footage from the aftermath of the attack as coming from a GBU-39 manufactured by the US-based Boeing.

== Response ==
=== Palestinian response ===
The Gaza Government's media office called the attacks a "massacre" that fell "within the framework of the crime of genocide and ethnic cleansing against our Palestinian people." It further accused the Israeli army of directly bombing a location holding displaced people while performing Fajr prayer in order to increase the number of civilians killed at once. The office claimed that the three explosives used in the attacks each bore 2,000 pound (907 kg) payloads. It called upon the international community and any organizations to put further pressure on Israel to stop their occupation. The office asserted that in addition to Israel, it held "the American administration fully responsible for this massacre."

Fatah called the attack a “heinous bloody massacre” that represented “peak of terrorism and criminality”, and asserted that the brutal nature of the strikes confirmed the genocidal nature of Israel's invasion of Gaza. It called on human rights organizations and the international community to stop the war immediately and prevent Israel from conducting further attacks. Palestinian deputy prime minister Nabil Abu Rudeineh stated U.S. weapons transfers were "directly responsible for this massacre".

Hamas denied that the school was being used as a command and control center and described the attack as a "horrific crime and a dangerous escalation" in Israel's "war of extermination against the Palestinian people".

Palestinian officials told CNN that no warning was given by Israel prior to the bombing.

PRCS spokeswoman Nebal Farsakh said that paramedics in Gaza were "shocked" and "horrified" by the scenes after the attack.

Palestinians in Jenin protested against on the streets after the attack, calling it a "massacre".

=== Israeli response ===
The IDF confirmed reports that its Air Force targeted "31 Hamas and PIJ terrorists" and that based on intelligence from the IDF, the Southern Command, and the Shin Bet the place was being used as a "Hamas headquarters". According to The Guardian, the IDF had made similar reports about the other 21 schools it had recently targeted but had not provided evidence. The IDF also accused an Al Jazeera journalist of covering up Hamas activity in the targeted school, which Al Jazeera condemned. David Mencer, a spokesperson for the office of Prime Minister of Israel, Benjamin Netanyahu, said Israeli footage showed there were no civilians in the area at the time of the strike, that precisely calibrated munitions were used to avoid civilian casualties, and that Hamas were responsible for any civilian deaths.

The IDF stated that it was aware that the school was a shelter for Gazan refugees. It made no claim that either gunfire or rockets had been fired from the school. It did not claim that a warning alert had been given to the refugees in the school. It did say that they had taken "many steps" to lower the likelihood of harm to civilians such as using precision weapons, intelligence, and "contractual measures". They asserted that Hamas deliberately set up one of their military headquarters in the school in order to use civilians as "a human shield for terrorist activity", accusing Hamas of "systematically violat[ing] international law". Additionally the IDF stated that the use of three precise munitions, that can't create the damage reported by the Hamas, and provided aerial photos from before and after the attack to assert that no severe damage was caused.

=== Response from family members of bombing victims ===
In an interview with Al Jazeera, several relatives of the victims alleged by Israel to be militants denied these accusations and described the victims as a Beit Hanoon Hospital administration director, a retired principal, a scholar of Arabic language and literature, and a man who was killed in December. "Israel is always looking for flimsy excuses to target civilians, especially in shelters,” said the daughter of one of the victims.

=== Humanitarian response ===
The regional director of Save the Children, Tamer Kirolos, calls the event "the deadliest attack on a school since last October". A UNICEF spokesperson called the attack "outrageous", stating, "All those schools are really packed with civilians, children, mothers and families, who are taking refuge in any empty space whether it's a school or it's a mosque, whatever it is, even in hospital yards." In a statement, the UN Human Rights Office condemned Israel's increasing frequency of attacks on schools and stated the strike was "conducted with apparent disregard for the high rate of civilian fatalities."

=== International responses ===
==== Governments ====
- Algeria: The country has requested an urgent and open United Nations Security Council meeting for Tuesday to discuss the Israeli attack.
- Australia: Foreign minister Penny Wong condemned the deaths caused by the attack and calls for an "immediate" ceasefire. Wong stated, "Australia condemns the deaths of civilians from Israel's strike on Al-Tabaeen School."
- Belgium: Minister of Foreign Affairs Hadja Lahbib has "strongly" condemned the attack, calling it "unacceptable".
- Brazil: Brazil's Ministry of Foreign Affairs expressed "deep solidarity with the families of the victims, as well as with the government and the people of the State of Palestine" and added that Israel's "[d]isregard for [the principle of proportionality] has been recurrent in Israeli military operations in the Gaza Strip over the past ten months."
- China: Chinese Foreign Ministry Spokesman Lin Jian condemned the bombing, stating China is against attacks on civilians and that violate international law.
- Egypt: The Foreign Ministry stated that Israel's willingness to knowingly kill unarmed civilians showed that it did not have any political intention or motivation to push towards a ceasefire for the war.
- France: The Foreign Ministry condemned the attack "in the firmest of terms" and said that "for several weeks, school buildings have been repeatedly targeted with an intolerable number of civilian victims. Israel must respect international humanitarian law".
- Iran: Foreign Ministry spokesman Nasser Kanaani has condemned the attack, stating that Israel had proved once again that it is not committed to any international laws or moral principles, secretary of the Supreme National Security Council, Ali Shamkhani, said that the Israeli government's goal was to thwart ceasefire negotiations and continue the war.
- Jordan: The Foreign Ministry stated that the attack "goes against all humanitarian values" and violates international law, People protested in Amman condemning the attack.
- Lebanon: The Ministry of Foreign Affairs stated that the strike is a "clear evidence of the Israeli government's disregard for international humanitarian law and its intention to prolong the war and expand its scope".
- Pakistan: The Foreign Ministry condemns the attack in the strongest terms and has said that Israel should be held accountable for these war crimes and genocide in Gaza. We call on the international community, especially the United Nations and supporters of Israel, to take immediate steps to end the genocide in Gaza and protect the people of Gaza.
- Qatar: The Foreign Ministry condemned the "horrific massacre", stating that it was a "brutal crime against displaced unarmed civilians and their fundamental rights under international humanitarian law and the 2610 resolution of the UN Security Council."
- Russia: Foreign Ministry spokeswoman Maria Zakharova has condemned the attack, stating that it undermine international efforts to de-escalate the war and reach an urgent ceasefire and prisoner-captive exchange.
- Saudi Arabia: The Ministry of Foreign Affairs said it denounced the attack in the "strongest terms".
- Turkey: The Foreign Ministry calls the "massacre" a "new crime against humanity" committed by Israel, also accusing Israeli Prime Minister Benjamin Netanyahu of wanting "to sabotage ceasefire negotiations".
- United Kingdom: David Lammy (the Secretary of State for Foreign, Commonwealth and Development Affairs) said that he was "Appalled by the Israeli Military strike on al-Tabeen school and the tragic loss of life. Hamas must stop endangering civilians. Israel must comply with International Humanitarian Law. We need an immediate ceasefire to protect civilians, free all hostages, and end restrictions on aid."
- United States: The White House expressed concern after the attacks, National Security Council spokesperson Sean Savett stated that "far too many civilians continue to be killed and wounded" and called for a ceasefire and a hostage deal. When asked about the attack, US Vice President Kamala Harris said Israel had a right to "go after Hamas" but should "avoid civilian casualties".

==== Supranational ====
- Arab League: The Arab Parliament has condemned the attack, describing it as a "terrorist and inhumane act".
- European Union: High representative for foreign affairs Josep Borrell said that he's "horrified" by the images from al-Tabaeen. He added that Israel has "targeted at least 10 schools this week" and there is "no justification for these massacres".
- Gulf Cooperation Council: Secretary-General Jasem Mohamed Al-Budaiwi has denounced the attack, describing it as "war crimes".
- Organisation of Islamic Cooperation: the organization condemned the strike as "an extension of the brutal massacres and genocide committed by the Israeli occupation for more than ten months in the Gaza Strip".
- United Nations: A UNICEF spokesperson told the BBC that the attack was "really outrageous", and said that "All those schools are really packed with civilians, children, mothers and families, who are taking refuge in any empty space whether it's a school or it's a mosque, whatever it is, even in hospital yards." The head of UNRWA, Philippe Lazzarini called for the end to the "horrors unfolding under our watch". Lazzarini further stated, "The unbearable cannot become the norm". The UN Human Rights Office condemned the increasing frequency of Israeli attacks on schools sheltering displaced Palestinians, and noted that this was at least the 21st attack on a school that the OHCHR had recorded since 4 July. The UN further stated that Israel needed to comply with the laws of precaution and proportionality. Lisa Doughten, a UNOCHA official, stated it was the "twenty-first strike on a school that has been serving as a shelter recorded since 4 July this year".

== Gallery ==
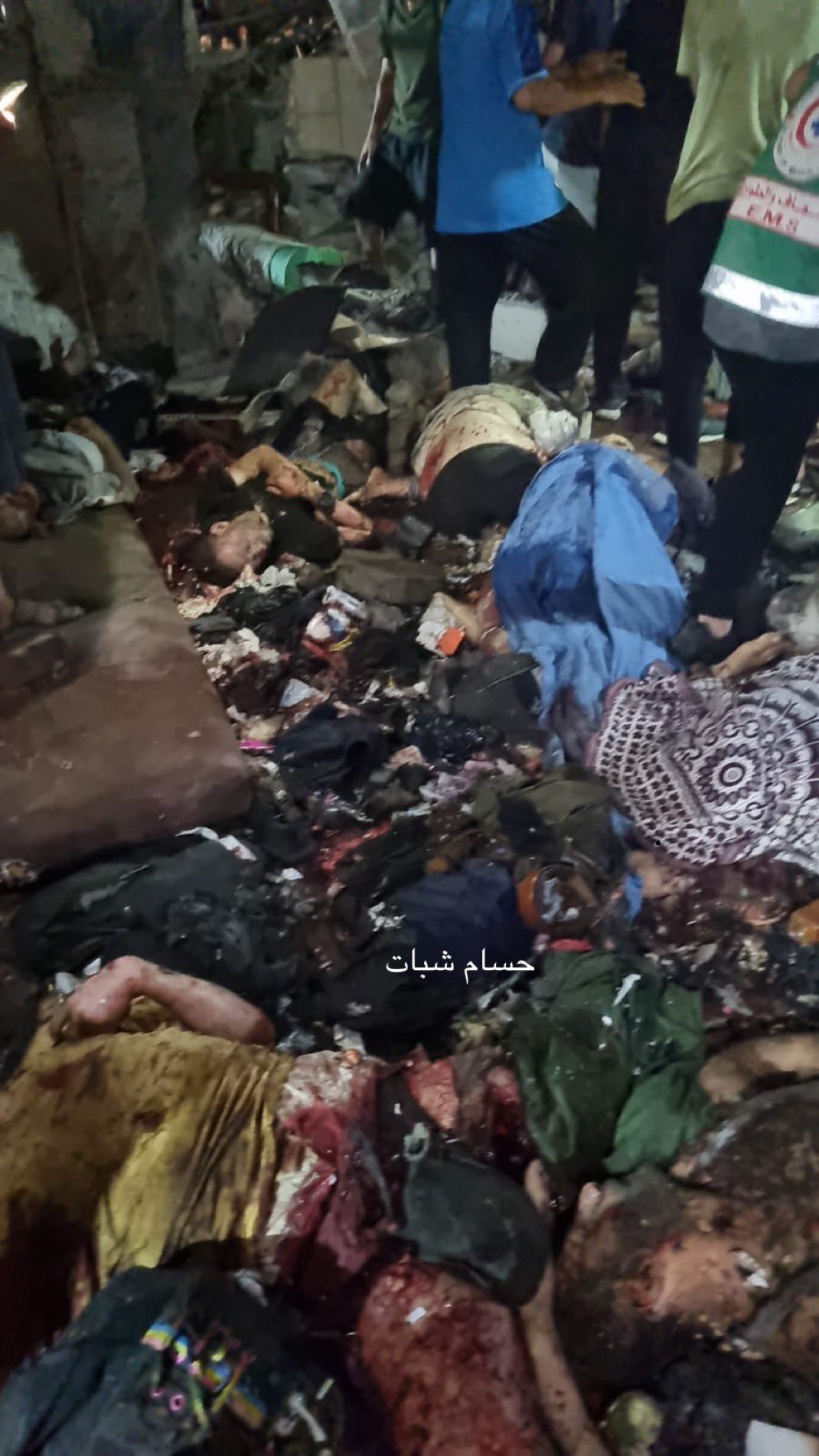
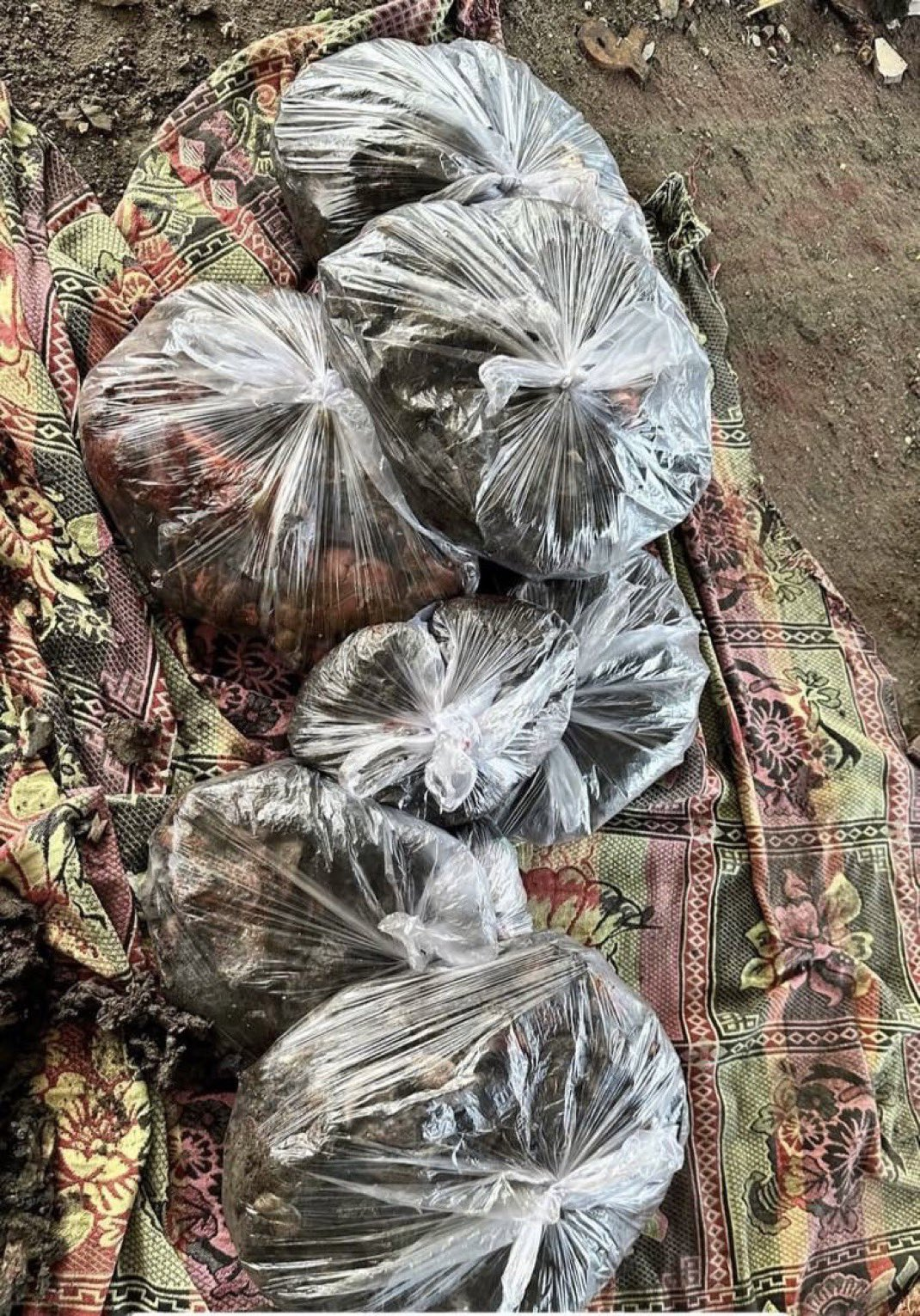
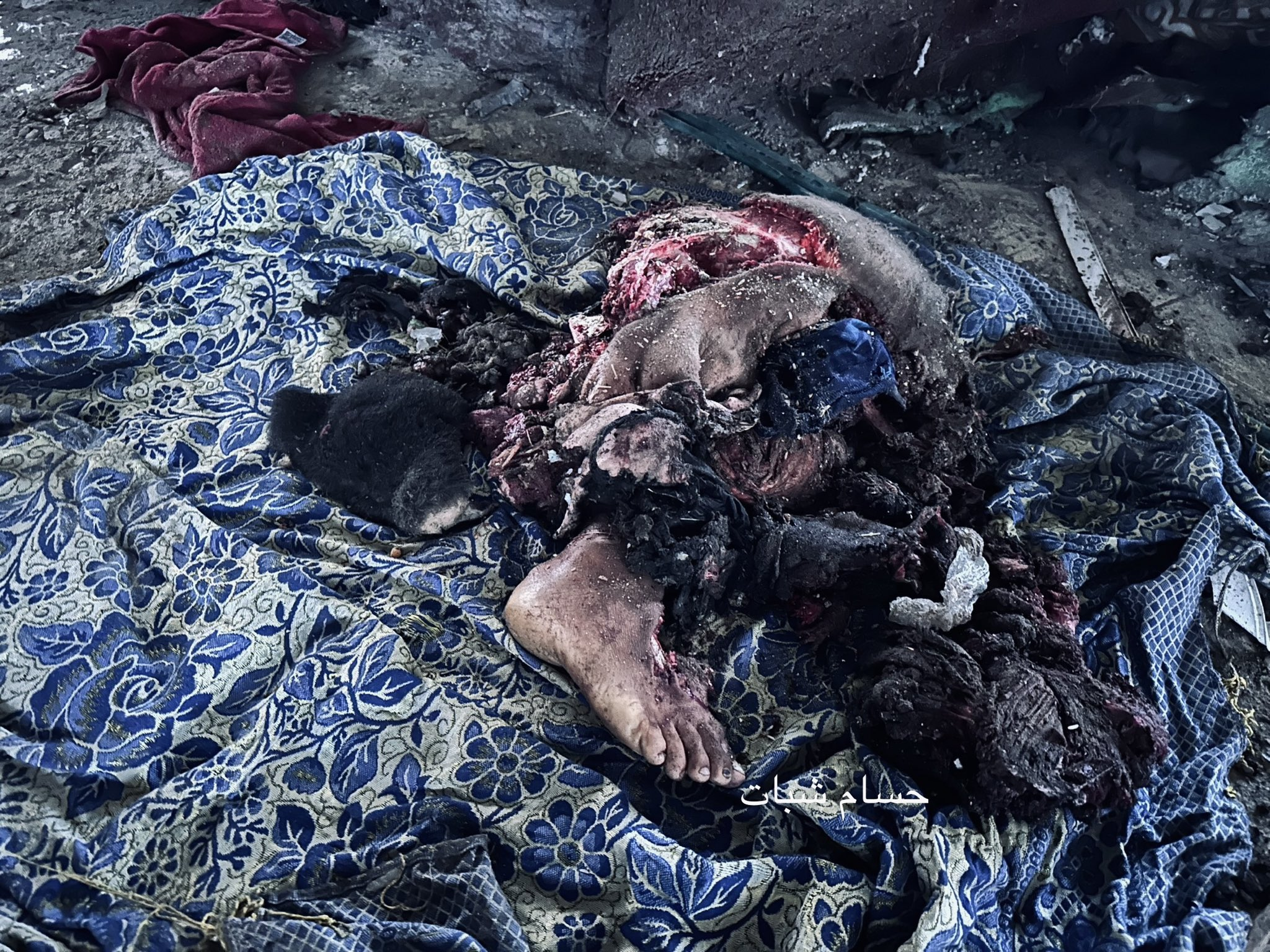

== See also ==
- Israeli war crimes
- Flour massacre
- Nuseirat rescue and massacre
- Israeli war crimes in the Gaza war
- Israeli bombing of the Gaza Strip
- Fahmi al-Jarjawi School attack
- Al-Farabi School Bombing
