= Lahcen Haddad =

Moroccan politician

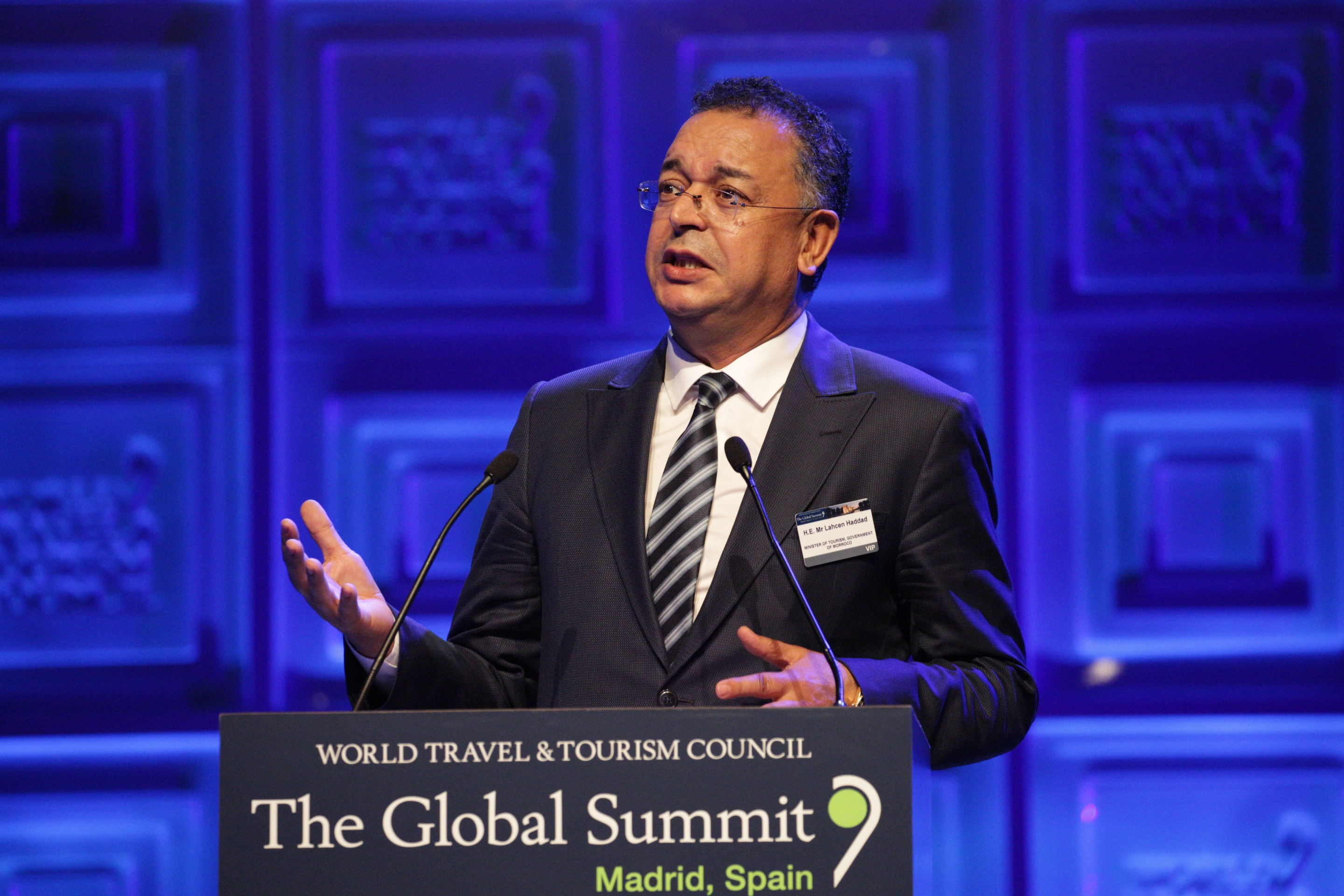
- Haddad in 2015

Minister of Tourism
- In office 3 January 2012 – 5 April 2017
- Monarch: Mohammed VI
- Prime Minister: Abdelilah Benkirane
- Preceded by: Yassir Znagui
- Succeeded by: Mohammed Sajid

Vice-President of the House of Councillors
- Incumbent
- Assumed office October 2024

Member of the Pan-African Parliament
- Incumbent
- Assumed office April 2025

Personal details
- Born: 16 March 1960 (age 66) Boujad, Morocco
- Party: Istiqlal Party
- Education: University of Mohammad V (1984); Indiana University Bloomington (1993); St. Thomas Aquinas College (1999)
- Occupation: Politician, Academic, Author, International Development Expert

Lahcen Haddad (Arabic: لحسن حداد - born 16 March 1960, Boujad) is a Moroccan politician of the Istiqlal Party. He currently serves as Vice-President of the House of Councillors of Morocco, the upper chamber of the Moroccan Parliament, and is a member of the Pan-African Parliament.

Dr. Haddad served as Minister of Tourism of Morocco from 2012 to 2017 in the cabinet of Abdelilah Benkirane, During his tenure, he oversaw the implementation of Morocco's national tourism strategy, focusing on destination development, tourism investment, air connectivity, sustainability, and the diversification of tourism products.

== Parliamentary leadership and international engagement ==
Haddad currently serves as Vice-President of the House of Councillors of Morocco, the upper chamber of the Moroccan Parliament. He is also a member of the Pan-African Parliament representing the Kingdom of Morocco. In November 2021, Haddad was elected President of the Morocco–European Union Joint Parliamentary Committee, a parliamentary body dedicated to strengthening political dialogue and cooperation between Morocco and the European Union.

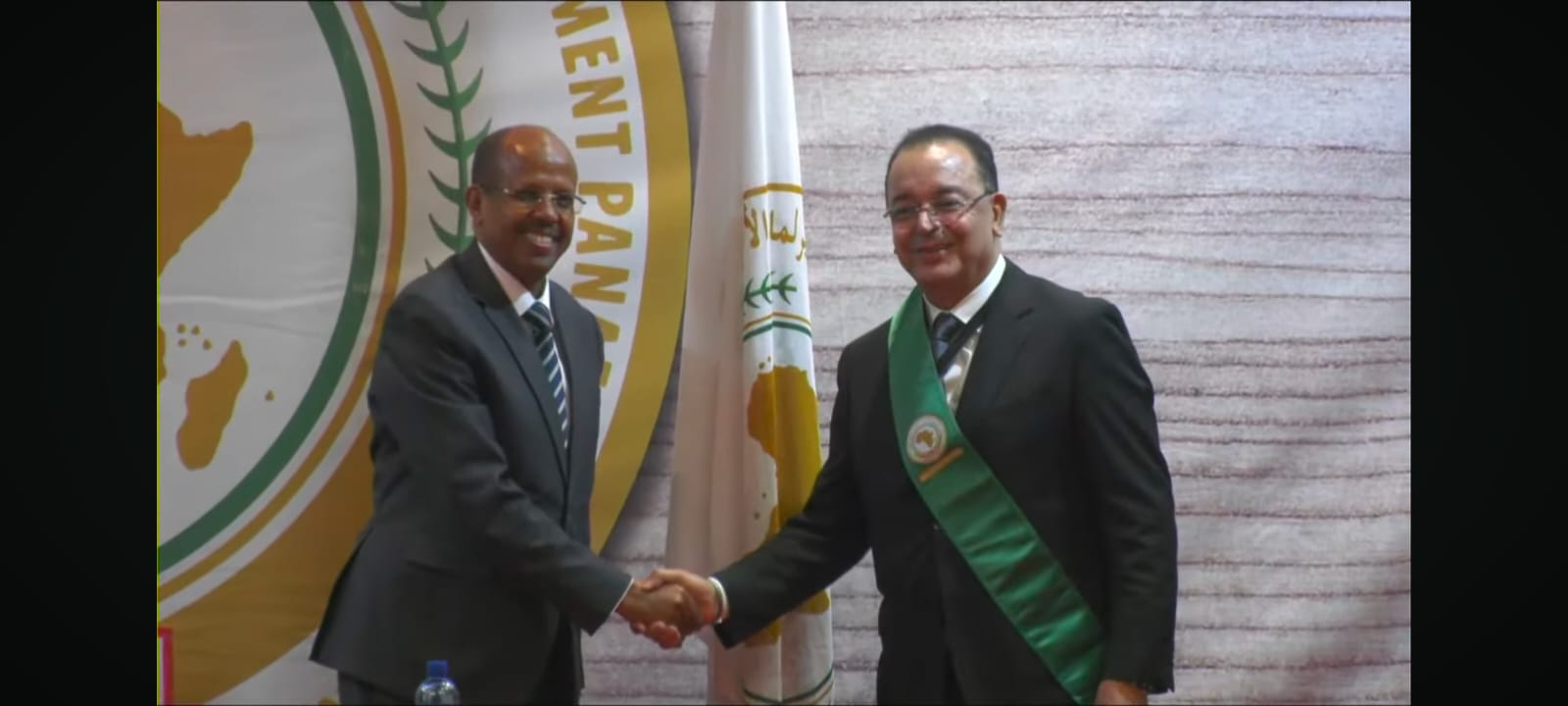
Haddad with the AUC chairperson

In 2025, Haddad was elected president of the thematic group on the Moroccan Sahara within the House of Councillors. The group intended to advocate for the international recognition of Moroccan-occupied Western Sahara as part of Morocco.

== See also ==
- Cabinet of Morocco
