= In Pieces (film) =

2010 Moroccan documentary film by Hakim Belabbes

Ashlaa (In Pieces)
- Arabic: أشلاء
- Directed by: Hakim Belabbes
- Screenplay by: Hakim Belabbes
- Cinematography: Hakim Belabbes Souad Mellouk Hamid Bellabes Don Smith
- Edited by: Hakim Belabbes
- Music by: Khalid Oueld El Bouazzaoui Mohamed El Meskaoui Salah El Morseli Cherqaoui
- Release date: 2010
- Running time: 90 minutes
- Country: Morocco

In Pieces (Arabic: أشلاء, romanized: Ashlaa) is a Moroccan 2010 documentary film.

== Synopsis ==
In Pieces is a posy of images taken over the last ten years that show family moments, reflections on life and death, on disappointments and successes, on aging and exile. This family chronicle becomes the chronicle of a country, of a society, as observed by Hakim Belabbes from inside and outside.

== Awards ==
- Festival de Tánger 2011
