= Bejaâd =

Bejaad بجعد Boujaad
- Town
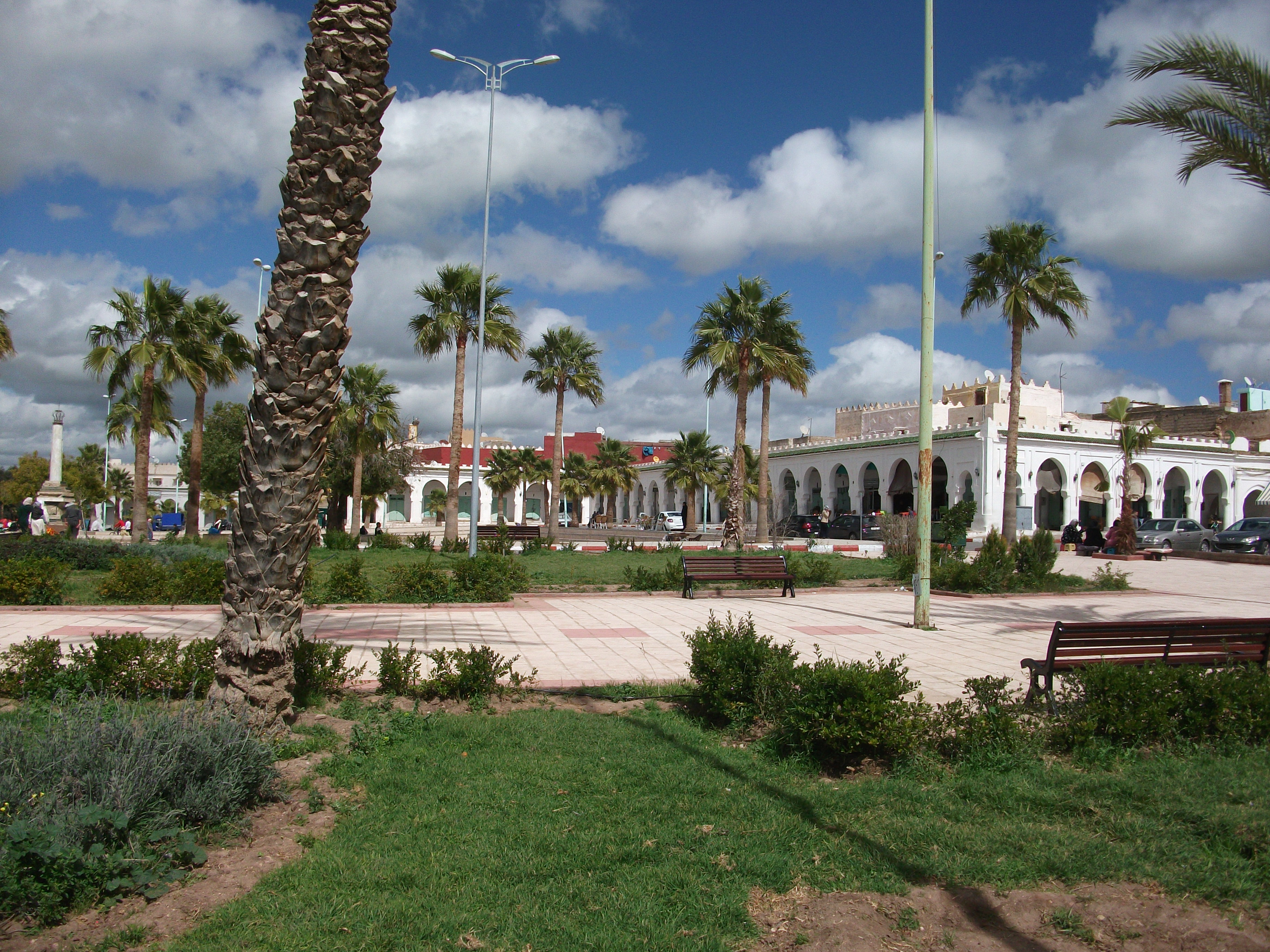
- Historic Medina of Bejaad
- Interactive map of Bejaad
- Country: Morocco
- Region: Béni Mellal-Khénifra
- Province: Khouribga
- Elevation: 400 m (1,300 ft)

Population (2024)
  - Total: 47,209
- Time zone: UTC+0 (GMT)

Bejaad, also spelled Boujaad (Note: Arabic: بجعد) is a town in central Morocco, located in Khouribga Province within the Béni Mellal-Khénifra region. it is considered the capital of the Beni Zemmour tribe.

== Gallery ==
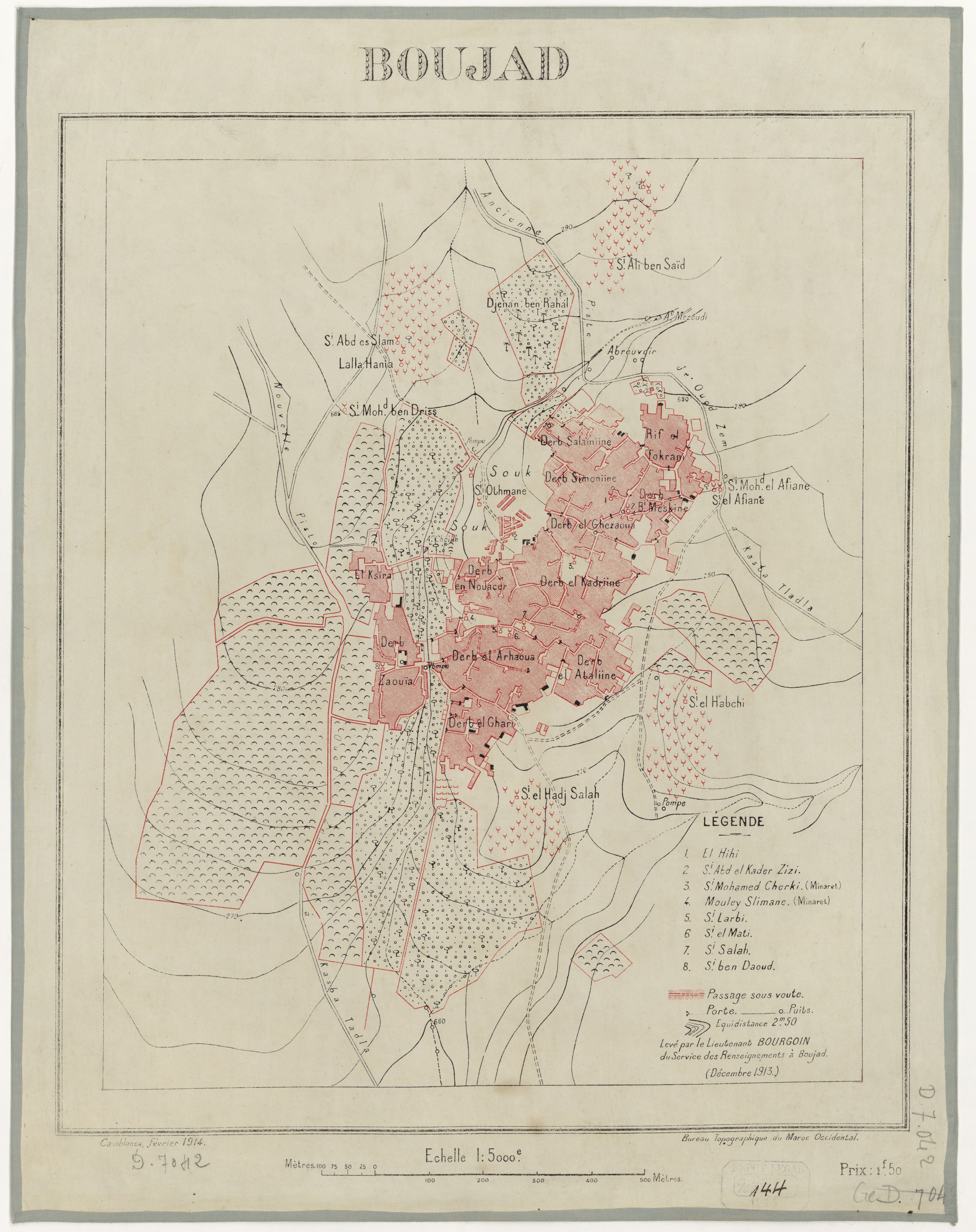

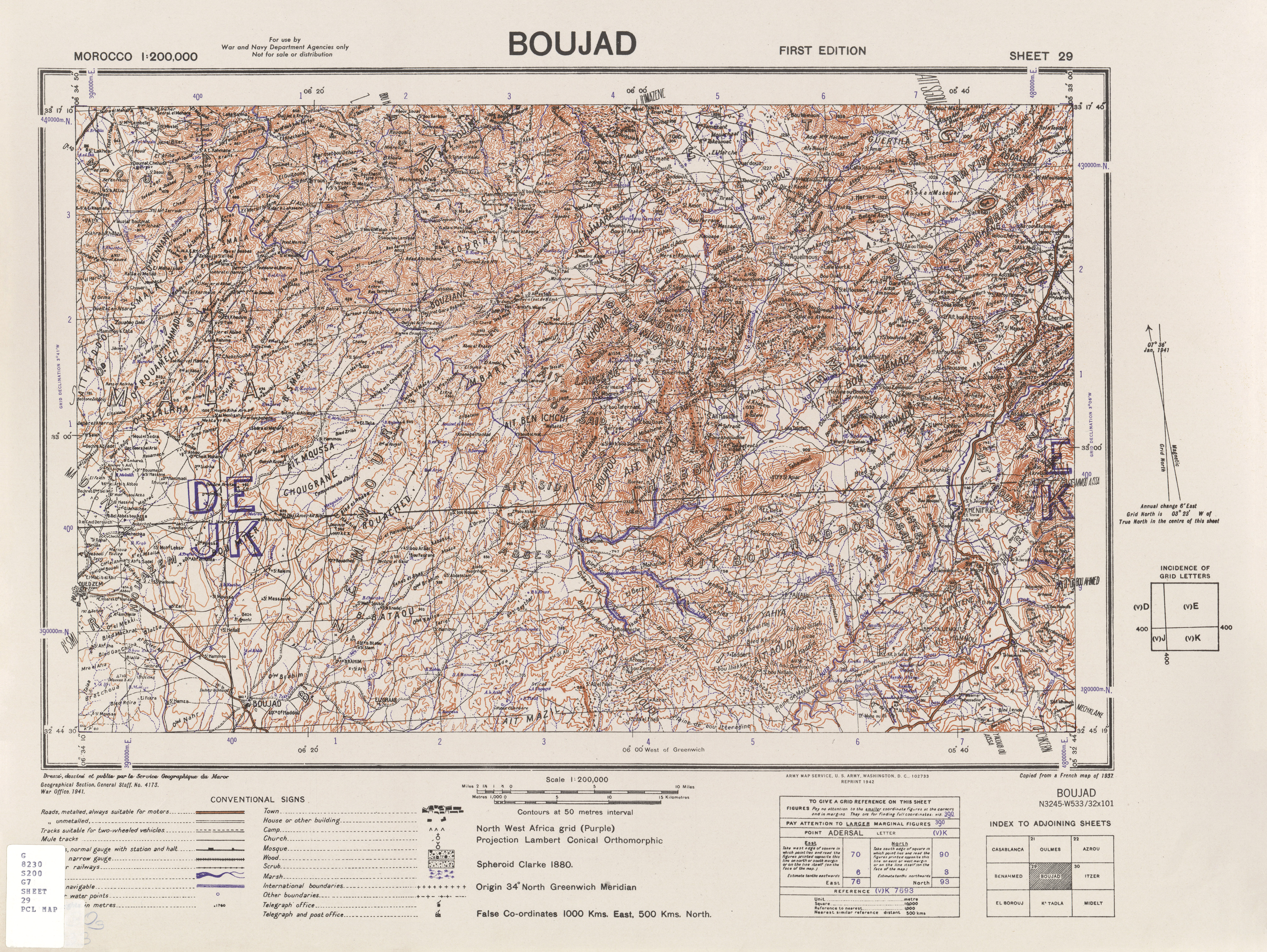

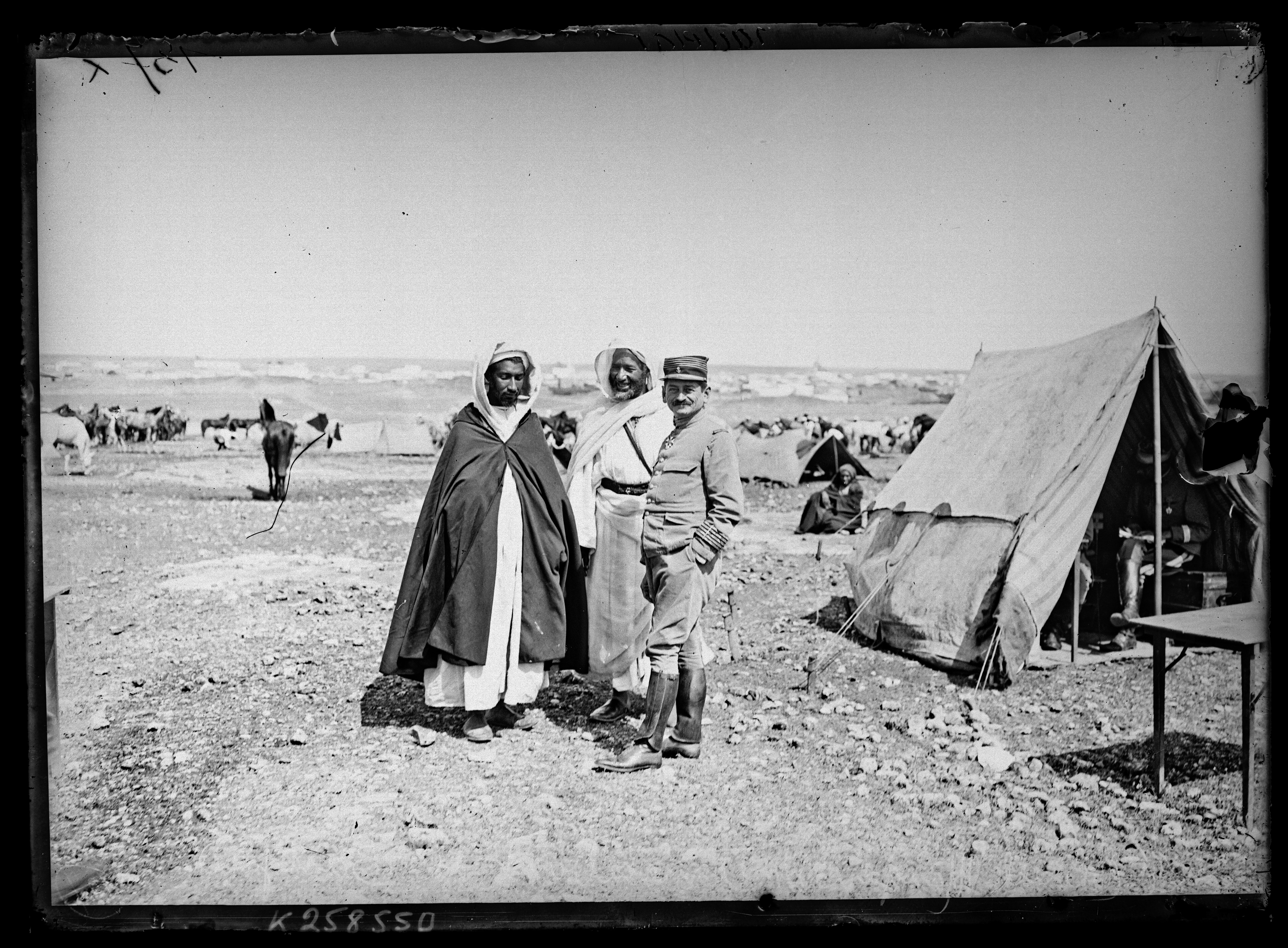

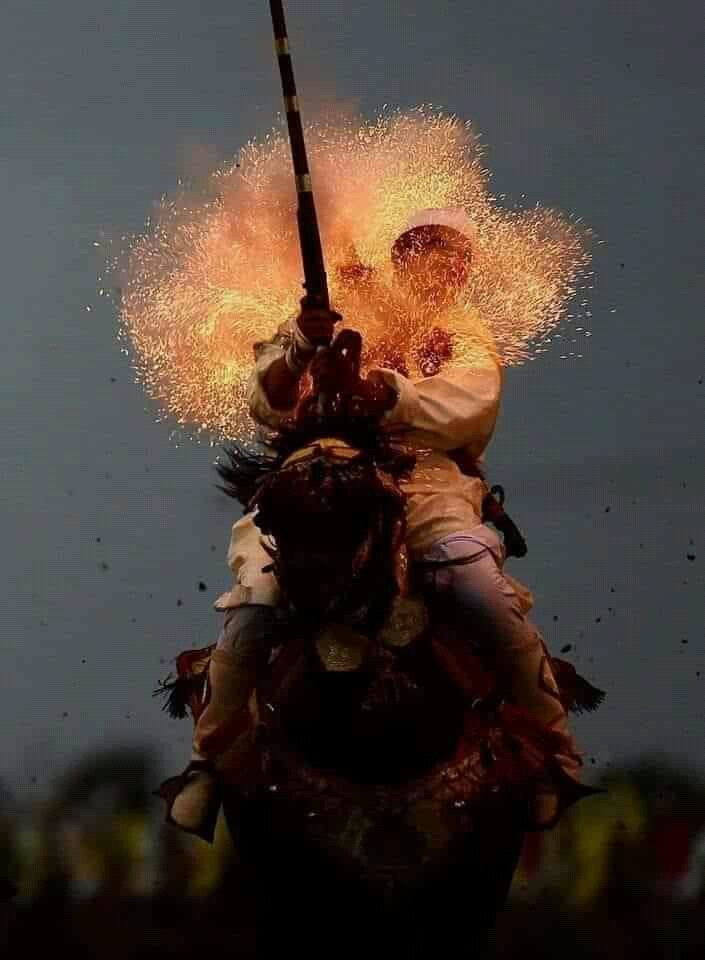

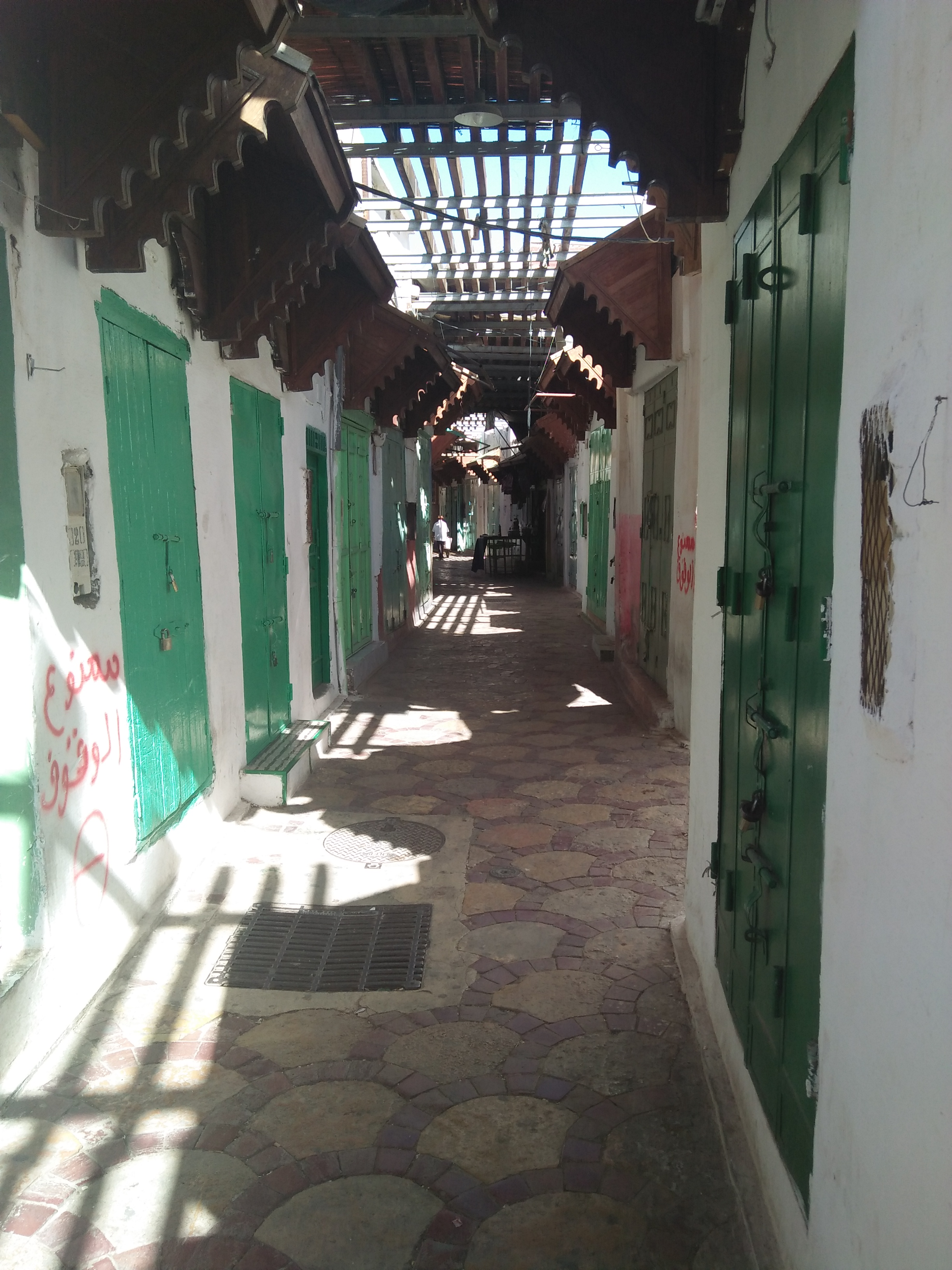

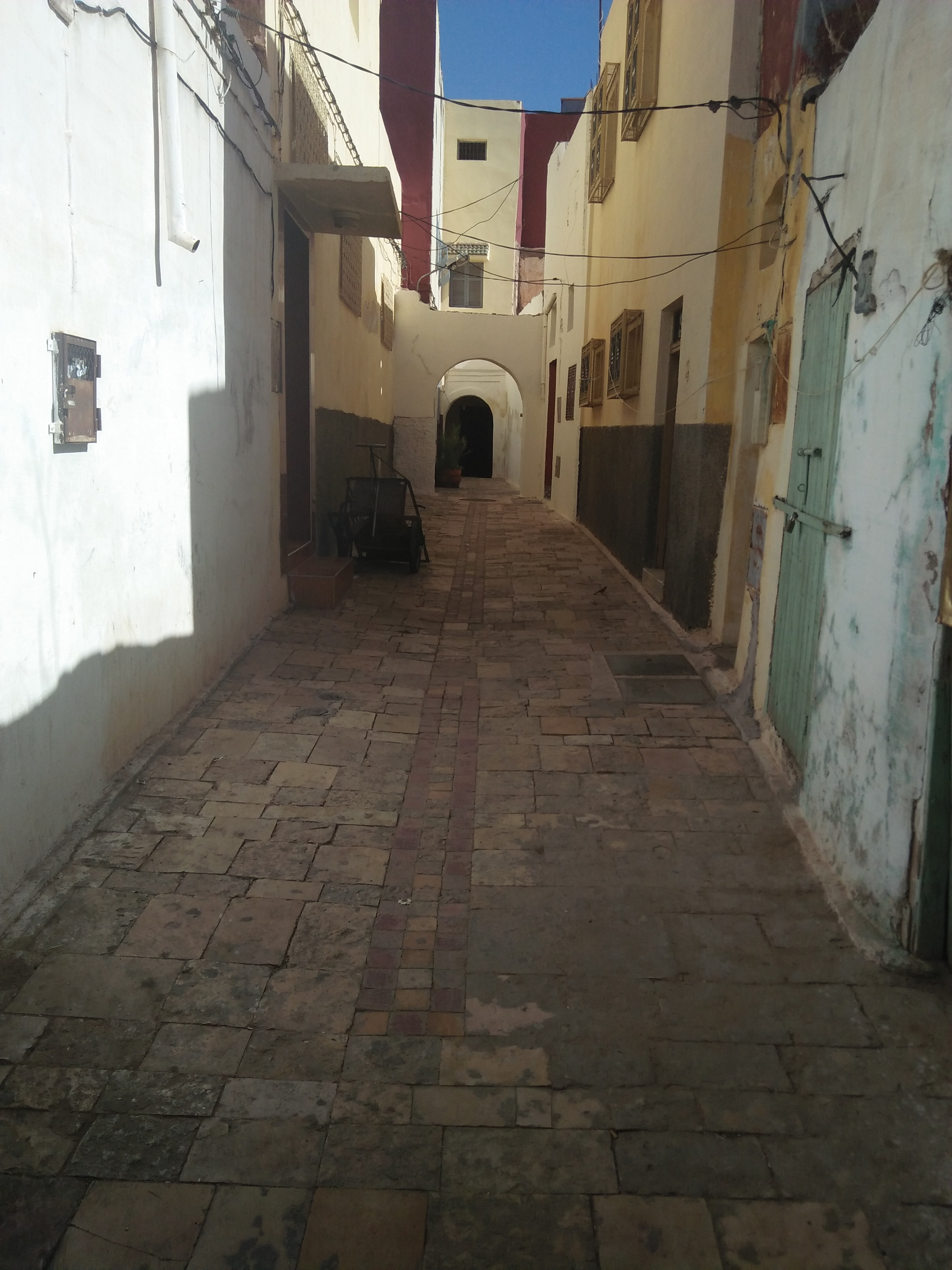

== Notable people ==
Famous people originated from Bejaâd include:

- Mohamed Cherkaoui, Moroccan politician
- Habib El Malki, Moroccan politician
- Taieb Cherkaoui Moroccan politician
- Lahcen Haddad, Moroccan politician
- Ahmed Cherkaoui, Moroccan painter
- Hakim Belabbes, Moroccan filmmaker
- Yehuda Lancry, Israeli diplomat
- Amir Peretz, former Israeli defense minister
- Shaul Amor, mayor of Migdal HaEmek, a member of the Israeli parliament and Israel's ambassador to Belgium.
