= David Mencer =

British-born Israeli spokesman

Spokesman for the office of the Prime Minister of Israel, Benjamin Netanyahu
- Incumbent
- Assumed office 2024
- Prime Minister: Benjamin Netanyahu
- Preceded by: Eylon Levy

Councillor of Barnet London Borough Council for The Hale
- In office 2004–2006

Director of Labour Friends of Israel
- In office 1998–2004

Personal details
- Born: 1972 (age 53–54) United Kingdom
- Party: Labour (1995–2015)
- Occupation: Lobbyist, spokesman, public relations
- Known for: Work as a spokesman for Israel during the Gaza War

David Mencer is an English-born Israeli public relations specialist, lobbyist, spokesperson, and former Labour Party official. He served as director of Labour Friends of Israel (LFI) from 1998 to 2004 and was elected as a Labour councillor in the London Borough of Barnet. In the mid-2010s he emigrated to Israel and later became a spokesperson for the office of Prime Minister of Israel, Benjamin Netanyahu, during the Gaza war.

== Early life and education ==
Mencer was born in the United Kingdom (UK) and is Jewish. He attended Hasmonean High School in London, a Jewish secondary school. He spent a year in Israel studying Middle Eastern history and politics and volunteered briefly in the Israel Defense Forces during the 1991 Gulf War. After returning to the UK, Mencer studied Politics and Government at London Guildhall University.

== Political career ==
In 1995, Mencer began working in British politics as a researcher in the House of Commons. He was a research assistant for Labour Shadow Transport Minister Joan Walley, and later worked for Labour MP Gwyneth Dunwoody, who chaired the House of Commons Transport Select Committee. He served as Dunwoody's electoral agent in her 1997 United Kingdom general election campaign, helping to increase her majority in the Crewe and Nantwich constituency.

In July 1998, Mencer became the director of Labour Friends of Israel (LFI), a pro-Israel lobby group within the Labour Party. He held this position until 2004. In that role he coordinated LFI's activities, organized visits to Israel for Labour politicians, and helped draft speeches and articles for Labour government ministers on Middle East topics. He also advised Gerald Ronson, chairman of the Community Security Trust, on Jewish community security issues during this period.

While still serving as LFI director, Mencer entered local politics. He was elected to Barnet London Borough Council in the February 2004 by-election for the Hale ward. Mencer later worked as campaign director for Labour MP David Lammy's bid in the 2015 London Labour Party mayoral selection.

== Public relations career ==
After leaving frontline politics, Mencer moved into public relations (PR) and communications, including directing two of the biggest accounts for the PR agency Weber Shandwick. He also represented and advised the UK government's Central Office of Information. He later founded his own firm, Raphael Consulting, which provided strategic advice on public affairs, corporate communications and government relations. In 2014, he was registered as a lobbyist for Maitland Political with the Association of Professional Political Consultants register in 2014.

== Move to Israel ==
Mencer left the Labour Party in 2015 after more than twenty years of membership. He said he resigned "with real regret" because of Jeremy Corbyn being elected as Labour's leader. He cited concerns about Corbyn's views on Israel and alleged antisemitism, saying that listening to Corbyn's explanations of his views made him feel "very uncomfortable" and gave him the impression that Corbyn "doesn't like my community". Mencer has called both Corbyn and former Labour politician Ken Livingstone "Jew hater".

Mencer has said he and his family immigrated to Israel in 2015 on "the very day Corbyn was elected leader". He has said that concerns about antisemitism in the UK and a desire to secure a safe future for his children influenced the decision. In 2021, he said that his family "chose to move to Israel", now saw it as home, and had not regretted the move.

== Israeli government spokesman ==
Mencer became a spokesman in the office of Benjamin Netanyahu, the Prime Minister of Israel, during the Gaza war following the dismissal of his predecessor in the role, Eylon Levy. In this capacity he regularly gives press conferences and interviews on behalf of the Israeli government. Mencer has appeared on British and international news outlets, and has defended controversial Israeli military actions and challenged reports of Palestinian casualties. He has gained attention and criticism for his confrontational interview style, which has led to heated exchanges with prominent journalists such as Krishnan Guru-Murthy, Nick Robinson, and Mark Austin. Mencer has called allegations Israel committed genocide in the Gaza War baseless, antisemitic, and a form of "Holocaust inversion".

During an August 2024 interview on Today, he accused host Mishal Husain of warranting a "pro-Palestinian reporter of the year award" after she questioned him on reports of Israel abusing prisoners and the Al-Tabaeen school attack. The National Union of Journalists subsequently condemned his conduct as "abusive" and "hectoring". Mencer has consistently denied the Gaza humanitarian crisis and Gaza Strip famine, prominently stating there was "no famine in Gaza, but rather a famine of truth". He has argued that any food shortages were "man-made" by Hamas to weaponise suffering rather than the result of an Israeli blockade and asserted that the UN aid programme in Gaza was a "billion-dollar racket".

In April 2024, the IDF killed seven aid workers, including three UK citizens and veterans of the British Armed Forces in the World Central Kitchen aid convoy attack. During an interview on the attack with Guru-Murthy, Mencer said "all of us have expressed grief" but refused to apologise for the attack, citing an ongoing investigation.

== Personal life ==
Mencer is married and has children. After moving to Israel, he settled in Tel Aviv with his family.
