= Catch 67 =

2017 book by Micah Goodman

Catch-67: The Left, the Right, and the Legacy of the Six-Day War
- Cover of the first Hebrew edition
- Author: Micah Goodman
- Original title: מלכוד 67
- Translator: Eylon Levy
- Language: Hebrew
- Published: 2017
- Publisher: Kinneret Zmora Dvir (Israel), Yale University Press (US)
- Publication place: Israel
- English publication date: 2018
- Pages: 264 (English ed.)
- ISBN: 978-0300236743 (US edition)

Catch-67: The Left, the Right, and the Legacy of the Six-Day War (Hebrew: מלכוד 67, romanized: Milkud 67) is a 2017 book by Israeli Jewish philosopher Micah Goodman on Israeli internal conflict over the West Bank occupation. The English-language translation by journalist Eylon Levy was published by Yale University Press in September 2018.

== Synopsis ==
The book, written in Hebrew, contends that the conflicted political center on the occupation has views from both the political left and right. Goodman concludes that while an armistice is possible, a comprehensive peace deal is not. The book became the subject of intense public debate, and became a best-seller from its March 2017 release through the next several months. Its release coincided with the 50th anniversary of Israeli victory in the 1967 Six-Day War and the resulting occupation of Palestinian territories.

== Reception ==
The book received mostly positive reviews. Isabel Kershner wrote in a review for The New York Times: "Examining the political, ethical, religious and security aspects of the conundrum, Mr. Goodman’s book gives equal weight to arguments on all sides. But while he allows that there is a dispute over the legal status of the West Bank land and whether it is truly occupied, he takes a clear stand when it comes to robbing the Palestinians of their freedom." Stu Halpern wrote for the Jewish Book Council "Micah Goodman convincingly argues that although each side of the Israeli political divide believes they know the path to solving "the Palestinian problem", both are incorrect. But at the same time, in their own ways, they are each also correct; that is what makes the issue so intractable." Kirkus Reviews wrote that the book is "an eloquent expression of the distant hope that deeply committed human beings can stop, inhale deeply, listen, change, and compromise."

Ehud Barak, former Prime Minister of Israel, reviewed the book for the Haaretz and harshly criticized it, writing:

If I were not confident beyond any doubt of the author’s intellectual integrity, I would say that this was an instructive example of post-truth and “alternative facts” being interwoven into a political debate. Since I am certain of Goodman’s integrity, I can only assume that while writing the book he met, on the one hand, too many right-wingers who presuppose that their “ideology” is a priori embedded in reality and constitutes part of it. Which, of course, is not the case. And, on the other hand, that he apparently met too few left-wingers, people from the House of Hillel, or politically unbiased experts, who could have enlightened him.

and:

Goodman’s overall thesis, though abundant with multifaceted analyses and with respect for all streams, is steeped in a right-wing agenda. The book’s thesis is woven, at times with crude seams, such that symmetry is created between the reasoning of the right and of the left – a symmetry that does not, realistically, exist. The result of the invented symmetry is the “catch,” from the “victims of which” the author wishes to forge a dialogue of openness and fraternal love. The reader, without realizing, absorbs more and more rightward-tilting ideas concerning security, demographics, the adversary’s stances and Israel’s possible room to act. Goodman is serving – unconsciously, I hope – the political approach of the messianic right and the “one-state” government. Amplifying their arguments, most of which are from the realm of faith and wishful thinking, he demands for them equal footing with the professional views of the absolute majority of the experts.
