= Hakim Belabbes =

Filmmaker from Marocco

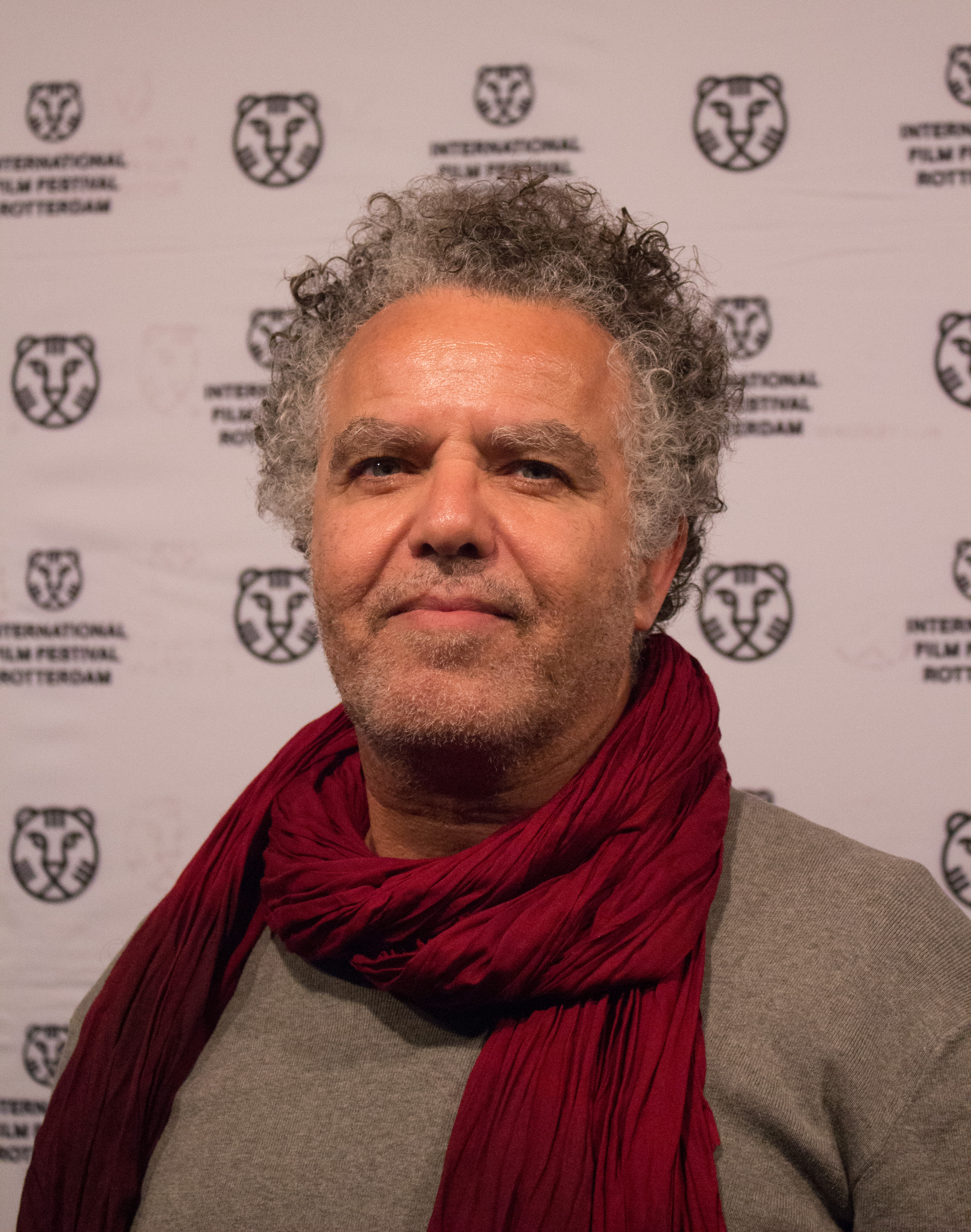
- Belabbes in 2017
- Born: حكيم بلعباس; 1961; Boujad, Morocco
- Occupation: Director

Hakim Belabbes (Arabic: حكيم بلعباس) (born 1961) is a Moroccan filmmaker.

== Early life ==
He was born in Bouja'd. His father owned the only movie theatre in the city. He studied American and African literature at Muhammad V University in Rabat, earning his bachelor's degree in 1983.

== Filmography ==
- Collapsed Walls (لو كان يطيحوا الحيوط), 2022
- Sweat Rain (عرق الشتا), 2017
- Weight of the Shadow (ثقل الظل) (Documentary), 2015
- Defining Love: A Failed Attempt (محاولة فاشلة لتعريف الحب), 2012
- Boiling Dreams (شي غادي وشي جاي), 2011
- Ashlaa (أشلاء) (Documentary), 2009
- These Hands (هذه الأيادي) (Documentary), 2008
- Why O'Sea (علاش البحر), 2006
- Khahit errouh (خيط الروح), 2003
- Tell the Water (Documentary short), 2002
- A Witness (Short), 2001
- R'maa (Documentary short), 2001
- Three Angels, No Wings (Short), 2001
- Whispers (Documentary short), 1999
- A Shepherd and a Rifle, 1998
- Still Ready (Short), 1997
- Boujad: A Nest in the Heat (Documentary), 1992
