= Fragmentation (sociology) =

In urban sociology, fragmentation refers to the destruction, underdevelopment, or absence of connections between a society and the grouping of certain of its members. These connections may concern culture, nationality, race, language, occupation, religion, income level, or other common interests. This gap between the people of interest and the rest of society may be:

- Social, indicating poor interrelationships;
- Economic, based on structural inequalities;
- Institutional, in terms of formal and specific political, occupational, educative, or associative organizations; or
- Geographic, implying regional or residential concentration.

The author bell hooks coined the term when addressing the problem of "hierarchy of oppression" within the feminist movement. This hierarchy is characterized by individuals feeling that experiencing more types of oppression lends greater validity to their own opinions. The perceived interpersonal differences engendered by this perspective may undermine group strength and solidarity within a movement. For example, in the 1970s, female identity was seen predominantly through the lens of white, middle-class women, and did not consider that identity could include additional cultural influences, such as race, gender, sexuality, and spirituality, all intersecting across points of privilege and oppression.

In Postmodern Blackness, hooks argued for greater inclusion and mutual support between groups, and an understanding of various types of feminism within the movement, with each sharing equity goals, yet having divergent ideas about the methods to achieve such goals.
