= 2025 Gaza war ceasefire =

2025 Gaza war ceasefire can refer to:

- January 2025 Gaza war ceasefire
- October 2025 Gaza war ceasefire
