= United Nations Security Council Resolution 2735 =

Calling on Hamas to accept an Israeli proposal for a hostage and ceasefire deal

UN Security Council Resolution 2735
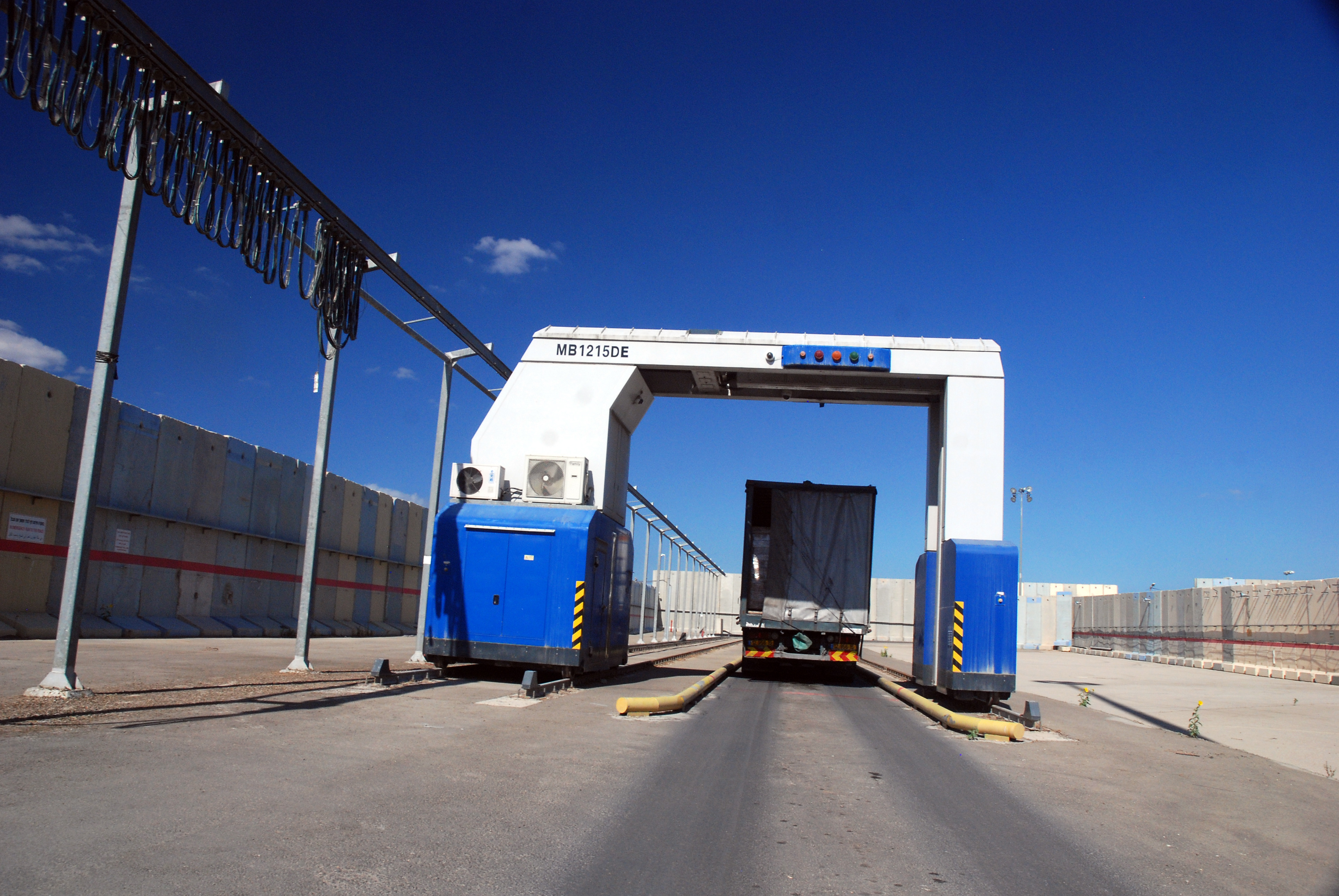
- Border crossing between Gaza and Israel
- Date: 10 June 2024
- Meeting no.: 9,650
- Code: S/RES/2735(2024) (Document)
- Subject: Gaza war
- Voting summary: 14 voted for; None voted against; 1 abstained
- Result: Adopted

Security Council composition
- Permanent members: China; France; Russia; United Kingdom; United States
- Non-permanent members: Algeria; Ecuador; Guyana; Japan; South Korea; Malta; Mozambique; Sierra Leone; Slovenia; Switzerland

United Nations Security Council Resolution 2735, adopted on 10 June 2024, calls on Hamas to accept a proposed hostage and ceasefire agreement in the ongoing Gaza war. The resolution, presented by the United States, details a three-phase proposal and notes Israel's acceptance thereof. The implementation of the described agreement would result in the release of all hostages held by Hamas, establish a permanent ceasefire in the Gaza Strip and advance a multi-year reconstruction plan. Additionally, the resolution rejects any demographic or territorial changes in the Gaza Strip and reaffirms the Security Council's support for a two-state solution, envisioning the unification of the Gaza Strip and the West Bank under Palestinian Authority governance. The resolution received unanimous support, with the Russian Federation abstaining from the vote.

In January 2025, Israel and Hamas reached a Gaza hostage and ceasefire agreement, which is heavily based on the three-phase proposal outlined and backed in Resolution 2735.

== Background ==
On 31 May 2024, President Joe Biden publicly presented a hostage and ceasefire proposal in a televised address, marking a pivotal moment in U.S. efforts to resolve the conflict. Developed with Qatari and Egyptian mediators, the proposal includes a six-week ceasefire during which Israeli forces would withdraw from populated areas of Gaza. In exchange, Hamas would release some hostages taken during the October 7 attacks, and Israel would free hundreds of Palestinian prisoners. Later phases of the plan envision the release of all hostages, a full Israeli withdrawal, and a reconstruction plan for the Gaza Strip. The details presented are a summary of a proposal Israel had transmitted to the mediators.

Despite the public appeal and the origin of this proposal, both Israeli Prime Minister Benjamin Netanyahu and Hamas did not publicly or formally accept the deal at the time of this resolution's adoption. Netanyahu argued that the publicly described terms are inaccurate and maintains that military operations would continue until Hamas is defeated.

The Biden administration exerted significant diplomatic pressure on Hamas through mediating countries, Egypt and Qatar. Both Qatar and Egypt have threatened Hamas leaders with possible arrest, freezing of assets, sanctions, and expulsion from Doha if they do not agree to the proposal on the table. These actions were part of a broader U.S. strategy to leverage regional influence to bring Hamas to the negotiating table and achieve a cessation of hostilities.

In Israel, political complexities affected the situation. Netanyahu's far-right coalition partners opposed any ceasefire and threatened to collapse the government if Netanyahu agreed to a deal. Opposition leaders offered support for a hostage agreement, but deep political divisions and Netanyahu's precarious position complicate his decision-making.

== Text of the resolution ==
The Security Council,

Reaffirming the purposes and principles of the Charter of the United Nations,

Recalling all its relevant resolutions on the situation in the Middle East, including the Palestinian question,

Underscoring the importance of the ongoing diplomatic efforts by Egypt, Qatar, and the United States aimed at reaching a comprehensive ceasefire deal, consisting of three phases,

1. Welcomes the new ceasefire proposal announced on May 31, which Israel accepted, calls upon Hamas to also accept it, and urges both parties to fully implement its terms without delay and without condition;

2. Notes that the implementation of this proposal would enable the following outcomes to spread over three phases:

(a) Phase 1: an immediate, full, and complete ceasefire with the release of hostages including women, the elderly and the wounded, the return of the remains of some hostages who have been killed, the exchange of Palestinian prisoners, withdrawal of Israeli forces from the populated areas in Gaza, the return of Palestinian civilians to their homes and neighborhoods in all areas of Gaza, including in the north, as well as the safe and effective distribution of humanitarian assistance at scale throughout the Gaza Strip to all Palestinian civilians who need it, including housing units delivered by the international community;

(b) Phase 2: upon agreement of the parties, a permanent end to hostilities, in exchange for the release of all other hostages still in Gaza, and a full withdrawal of Israeli forces from Gaza; and

(c) Phase 3: the start of a major multi-year reconstruction plan for Gaza and the return of the remains of any deceased hostages still in Gaza to their families;

3. Underlines that the proposal says if the negotiations take longer than six weeks for phase one, the ceasefire will still continue as long as negotiations continue, and welcomes the readiness of the United States, Egypt, and Qatar to work to ensure negotiations keep going until all the agreements are reached and phase two is able to begin;

4. Stresses the importance of the parties adhering to the terms of this proposal once agreed and calls upon all Member States and the United Nations to support its implementation;

5. Rejects any attempt at demographic or territorial change in the Gaza Strip, including any actions that reduce the territory of Gaza;

6. Reiterates its unwavering commitment to the vision of the two-State solution where two democratic States, Israel and Palestine, live side by side in peace within secure and recognized borders, consistent with international law and relevant UN resolutions, and in this regard stresses the importance of unifying the Gaza Strip with the West Bank under the Palestinian Authority;

7. Decides to remain seized of the matter.

== Voting record ==
- Permanent members of the Security Council are in bold.

Approved (14)	Abstained (1)	Opposed (0)
Algeria; **China**; Ecuador; **France**; Guyana; Japan; Mozambique; Malta; Sierra Leone; Slovenia; South Korea; Switzerland; **United Kingdom**; **United States**	**Russia**	

== Reactions ==
=== Israel and Palestine ===
- Israel: Israel's representative to the U.N. neither confirmed nor denied Israel's acceptance of the hostage and ceasefire proposal, echoing the Prime Minister's statements that Israel intends to keep fighting until all hostages are freed and Hamas is dismantled militarily.
- Palestine: President of the Palestinian Authority Mahmoud Abbas welcomed the resolution's adoption.
- Hamas: The organization welcomed the contents of the resolution, stating that Hamas is ready to engage with mediators in further negotiations. Senior spokesman Sami Abu Zuhri stated Hamas has accepted the resolution.

== See also ==
- List of United Nations Security Council Resolutions 2701 to 2800
- List of United Nations resolutions concerning Israel
- List of United Nations resolutions concerning Palestine
- United Nations Security Council Resolution 2728
