= January 2025 Gaza war ceasefire =

Israel–Hamas hostage-prisoner exchange and armistice

"Three-Phase Proposal for a Durable Peace in the Middle East"
- The first three hostages being released within the ceasefire agreement, with the International Committee of the Red Cross turning over the former hostages to the custody of the IDF
- Context: Ending the Gaza war; Reconstructing the Gaza Strip
- Drafted: 31 May 2024
- Sealed: 15 January 2025
- Effective: 19 January 2025
- Expiration: 18 March 2025
- Mediators: Egypt; Qatar; United States
- Parties: Hamas; Israel

A hostages-and-prisoners exchange and armistice between Israel and Hamas-led Palestinian militant groups in the Gaza Strip took effect from 19 January to 18 March 2025, during the Gaza war. It included eight rounds of hostage-and-prisoner exchanges between Israel and Hamas.

The initial proposal included three stages, beginning with a six-week ceasefire and the release of all Israelis and Palestinians by both parties, an end to the war, Israel's withdrawal from the Gaza Strip, and a reconstruction plan. The proposal was first drafted by mediators from the United States, Egypt, and Qatar, accepted by Hamas on 5 May 2024. On 10 June, the UN Security Council supported it as Resolution 2735. Later in 2024, Israeli prime minister Benjamin Netanyahu rejected a permanent ceasefire, while some US officials also accused Hamas of hindering the proposal. President-elect Donald Trump joined President Biden in pressuring Israel to accept a similar proposal. A variation of the proposal was accepted by Israel and Hamas on 15 January 2025. On 17 January, the deal was signed and approved by the Security Cabinet of Israel and later the full Cabinet of Israel.

During the first stage, in exchange of the release of 30–50 Palestinians prisoners for every Israeli released, Hamas released 33 hostages. Israel agreed to provide "intensive and sufficient" quantities of humanitarian aid, allow displaced Palestinians to return home and begin a phased withdrawal from Gaza. In the second stage, Israel would accept a permanent ceasefire and Hamas would release the remaining living male hostages, both civilians and soldiers, for an exchange of Palestinian prisoners. In the third stage, the remains of deceased Israeli hostages would be released. Under the 5 May proposal, Israel would commit to lifting the blockade on the Gaza Strip, but this commitment was not present in the 31 May proposal.

From the beginning of the implementation of the deal, Israel was consistently accused of violating it by killing Palestinians and hindering aid since the ceasefire came into effect. Israel accused Hamas of violating the deal with delays in providing the names of hostages. On 10 February, Hamas announced that it would suspend the release of the Israeli hostages, citing violations by Israel; this led to threats from Trump and Netanyahu in response. Hamas revoked the suspension, saying that Egyptian and Qatari mediators would oversee humanitarian provisions of the truce agreement, and released Israeli hostages as agreed upon. On 22 February, Hamas released six living hostages as stipulated, but Israel refused to release 620 Palestinian prisoners as stipulated, instead instituting an indefinite delay of the release while accusing Hamas of repeatedly violating the deal. On 25 February, Israel and Hamas reached a deal to exchange the bodies of Israeli hostages in exchange for the release of hundreds of Palestinian prisoners.

On 1 March, the day the first phase of the ceasefire was scheduled to end, Hamas rejected an Israeli proposal to extend it to release more hostages. Hamas said the second phase should proceed as originally planned. Netanyahu's office said that Israel endorsed a US plan to extend the Gaza truce for the Ramadan and Passover periods. Under this plan, half of the living and dead hostages would be released on the first day of the extended truce and the remaining hostages would be released at the end of the period if a permanent truce was reached. Following Hamas's refusal to accept the proposal, Israel ceased the entry of aid to Gaza the next day, 2 March. The humanitarian aid blockade was condemned by mediators Egypt and Qatar, as well as the United Nations, as a violation of the ceasefire, which stipulated that phase one would automatically be extended as long as phase two negotiations were in progress.

On 9 March, Israeli energy minister Eli Cohen ordered to halt supply of Israeli electricity to Gaza. On 14 March, Hamas said that it agreed to a proposal from mediators to release Israeli-American hostage Edan Alexander and the bodies of four dual national hostages. Israel and the United States rejected the claim.

On 18 March, Israel launched surprise airstrikes on Gaza, breaking the ceasefire with Hamas. Netanyahu's office stated that the strikes were carried out in response to Hamas's refusal to release hostages and its rejection of proposals to extend the cease-fire. Hours later, Netanyahu declared that Israel has "resumed combat in full force" against Hamas in Gaza, with the wave of airstrikes being "just the beginning".

== Background ==
=== Initial ceasefire and mediation ===
Following the Hamas-led attack on Israel on 7 October 2023 and Israel's subsequent declaration of war on Hamas, Egypt and Jordan began coordinating a response to avert an escalation of the conflict. Attempts to reach a ceasefire were raised at the United Nations Security Council in October; Israel requested the resignation of United Nations secretary-general António Guterres after he referred to Israel's retaliation as unjustified collective punishment. After Israel's invasion of the Gaza Strip, Israeli prime minister Netanyahu rejected a ceasefire, equating a halt in fighting to a surrender to Hamas and terrorism. United States secretary of state Antony Blinken presented "humanitarian pauses" to countries in the region but stated a ceasefire would allow Hamas to initiate a second attack on Israel. An agreement was nearly reached, but forfeited after Israel's invasion of Gaza.

In a press conference in November, Netanyahu stated a ceasefire would necessitate a return of Israeli hostages taken during the attack. Saudi Arabia, Jordan, and Egypt intensified efforts to reach a ceasefire; at the Joint Arab Islamic Extraordinary Summit, Iran and Saudi Arabia urged for a ceasefire. The Washington Post reported on 18 November that the U.S. was nearing an agreement to release hostages and halt fighting, drafted during discussions in Doha, Qatar. On 22 November, Israel and Hamas exchanged hostages for prisoners and held a four-day ceasefire. President Biden was critical to restoring negotiations, according to The Wall Street Journal. Israel and Hamas extended the ceasefire for an additional two days and released additional hostages and detainees, but Israel resumed its offensive after Qatari mediators could not resolve differences in terms.

The U.S. government began urging Israel and Hamas to negotiate, according to National Security Council strategic communications coordinator John Kirby. In December, Egypt provided a ceasefire plan obtained by the Associated Press that would gradually release hostages and form a Palestinian government to administer Gaza and the occupied West Bank, relinquishing control from Hamas. Several days later, NPR reported on a revised proposal that would remove references to the governance of Gaza and the occupied West Bank. Efforts at the United Nations Security Council failed to offer a ceasefire over concerns relating to aid monitoring by the United Nations. By January, several Israeli commanders expressed beliefs that releasing hostages could only be achieved through diplomacy, according to The New York Times; general Gadi Eisenkot stated publicly that Israel should "rescue civilians, ahead of killing an enemy".

=== Further ceasefire negotiations ===
Throughout January 2024, Egyptian and Qatari mediators suggested several proposals, ranging from weeks to months. Hamas officials stated the remaining hostages, estimated to number over a hundred, would be released if a favorable and comprehensive ceasefire was offered; Netanyahu rejected a permanent ceasefire if Hamas would be allowed to govern Gaza. Israeli officials suggested a permanent ceasefire if Hamas leaders went into exile, a deal opposed by Hamas. On 25 January, the U.S. announced Central Intelligence Agency director William J. Burns would meet with Israeli, Egyptian, and Qatari officials. According to the U.S., Israel proposed a 60-day ceasefire. In discussions, officials discussed exchanging hostages, enhancing the Palestinian Authority, and improving Israel–Saudi Arabia relations in exchange for support of a Palestinian state.

Following the meeting in Paris, Hamas chief political leader Ismail Haniyeh stated the organization was considering a deal, but remained committed to a withdrawal of Israeli forces in Gaza, a demand rejected by Netanyahu. Al-Aqsa reported that Hamas continued to discuss the proposal through 4 February as Antony Blinken arrived in Saudi Arabia to advance a framework on a ceasefire. In a meeting with Israeli minister without portfolio Benny Gantz, U.S. vice president Kamala Harris urged for a ceasefire and the release of hostages. By 7 March, ceasefire discussions did not appear to progress. According to Axios, Hamas prioritized returning Palestinians to northern Gaza in discussions. Leading up to Ramadan, mediators from the U.S., Egypt, and Qatar increased efforts to reach a ceasefire; Burns met with Barnea in Jordan on 8 March to discuss a hostage deal. Netanyahu rejected Hamas's counteroffer as "ludicrous", but remained open to negotiating.

On 18 March 2024, Israel and Hamas began negotiating for the first time since December 2023. Hamas eased its demands, removing an agreement to hold a permanent ceasefire. A United Nations warning of an imminent famine furthered discussions to reach a ceasefire. The United States abstained from voting on United Nations Security Council Resolution 2728, a resolution that demands a ceasefire during Ramadan and the unconditional release of hostages, allowing the vote to pass but creating a conflict with Netanyahu. By 26 March, negotiations had stalled; Israel accused Hamas of stalling discussions, encouraged by the U.S.'s abstention of Resolution 2728. Burns, Sheikh Mohammed, Barnea, and Egyptian officials met in Doha to discuss a proposal that included an increased number of released Palestinian prisoners.

=== Aid convoy attack and U.S. policy change ===
On 1 April, Israeli strikes on a World Central Kitchen aid convoy killed seven workers. Biden condemned the attack, stating Israel had "not done enough to protect civilians". In a call three days after the strikes, Biden told Netanyahu to seek an "immediate ceasefire", warning that the U.S. could shift its policy on the war if Israel does not adhere to his demands. Biden urged Egypt and Qatar to pressure Hamas to reach a temporary ceasefire and the release of hostages. On 7 April, Israel withdrew the 98th Paratroopers Division from Khan Yunis, significantly reducing Israel's presence in southern Gaza. According to Israeli defense minister Yoav Gallant, the withdrawal was intended to reallocate resources towards a planned invasion of Rafah.

== Negotiation process ==
=== April 2024: Initial discussions ===
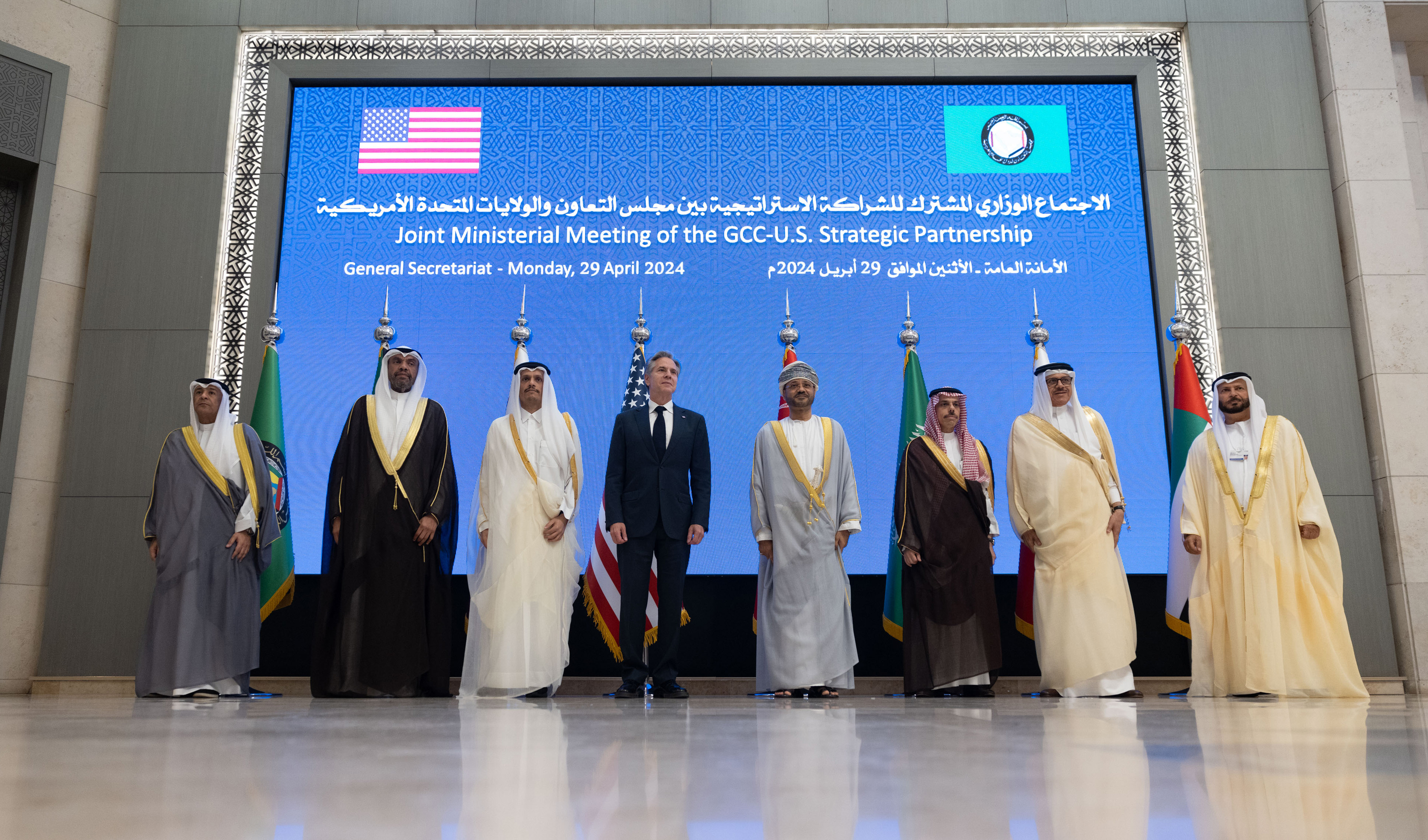
US Secretary of State Antony Blinken and foreign ministers of the Gulf Cooperation Council member states in Riyadh, Saudi Arabia, 19 April 2024

In early April, talks appeared to have been stalled on at least two issues. Hamas insisted it will only release the hostages in exchange for a permanent ceasefire, but Israel said it would only agree to a temporary one. Palestinians also demanded that Gazans be allowed to return to their homes in Gaza, which Israel rejected. On 8 April 2024, Central Intelligence Agency director William J. Burns presented a proposal to release forty hostages in exchange for a six-week ceasefire to Mossad director David Barnea, Qatari prime minister Mohammed bin Abdulrahman bin Jassim Al Thani, and General Intelligence Service director Abbas Kamel. Hamas rejected the proposal for temporary truce, and once again demanded a permanent ceasefire. On 15 April, a senior US Congressman Steny Hoyer threatened that the US "will reevaluate its relationship with Qatar" if it doesn't pressure Hamas to release the hostages. Qatar responded by saying it will reevalutate its role as a mediator. On 18 April, CIA Director Burns blamed Hamas for lack of a deal, pointing out that Gazan civilians would get some humanitarian relief under the current proposal. On 26 April, Hamas repeated that it was "serious" about a deal, but only if it included a permanent ceasefire.

On 27 April, Hamas received an Israeli ceasefire proposal. According to Axios, the agreement included "a willingness to discuss" a "sustainable calm" in Gaza after an initial hostage release. Yet on 30 April, Israeli Prime Minister Netanyahu said "The idea that we will stop the war before achieving all of its goals is out of the question." Netanyahu promised to invade Rafah "with or without a deal". Two days later, Israel appeared willing to accept an initial release of thirty-three hostages as U.S. president Joe Biden reiterated urges for Hamas's support of Israel's proposal to Egypt and Qatar.

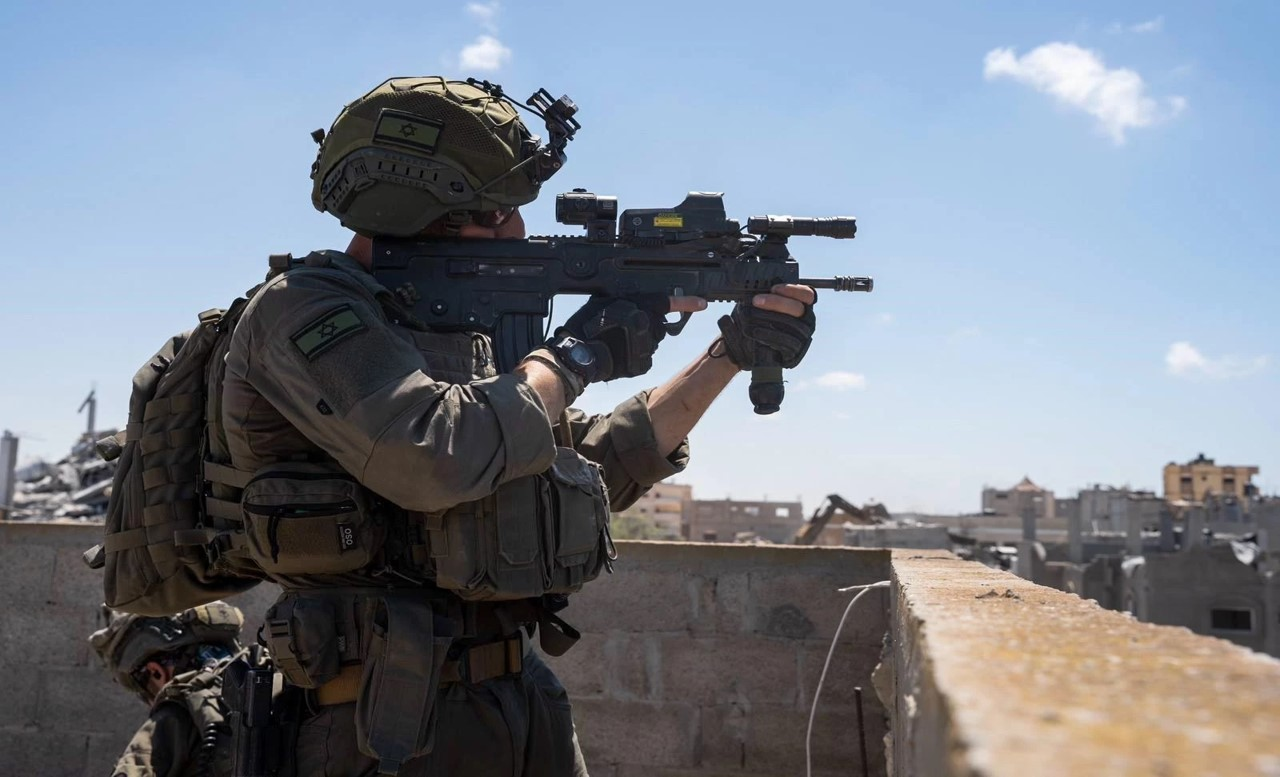
Netanyahu said the Rafah offensive would happen "with or without a deal".

U.S. secretary of state Antony Blinken appeared in Riyadh, Saudi Arabia, to garner support for a ceasefire from the Gulf Cooperation Council's members. Israeli prime minister Benjamin Netanyahu vowed to invade Rafah regardless of a ceasefire. Blinken said Israel's offer was "extraordinarily generous" and blamed Hamas for not accepting it. Hamas responded that "Even the Israeli negotiating team admitted Netanyahu was the one who was hindering reaching an agreement". On 1 May, Hamas rejected the Israeli proposal, but promised to make a counter-proposal, while also saying that Israel's Rafah invasion could put the talks in jeopardy. On Telegram, Hamas chief political leader Ismail Haniyeh said on 2 May the organization viewed the proposal with "positive spirit" and planned to send a delegate to Egypt. According to a text message obtained by The New York Times, former Hamas military leader Husam Badran wrote two days later the organization's representatives approached Israel's proposal with "great positivity". Discussions stalled by 5 May in a purported "crisis" over the duration of a ceasefire; Hamas requested a permanent ceasefire, while Netanyahu was open to only a temporary ceasefire.

=== May 2024: Egyptian–Qatari proposal ===
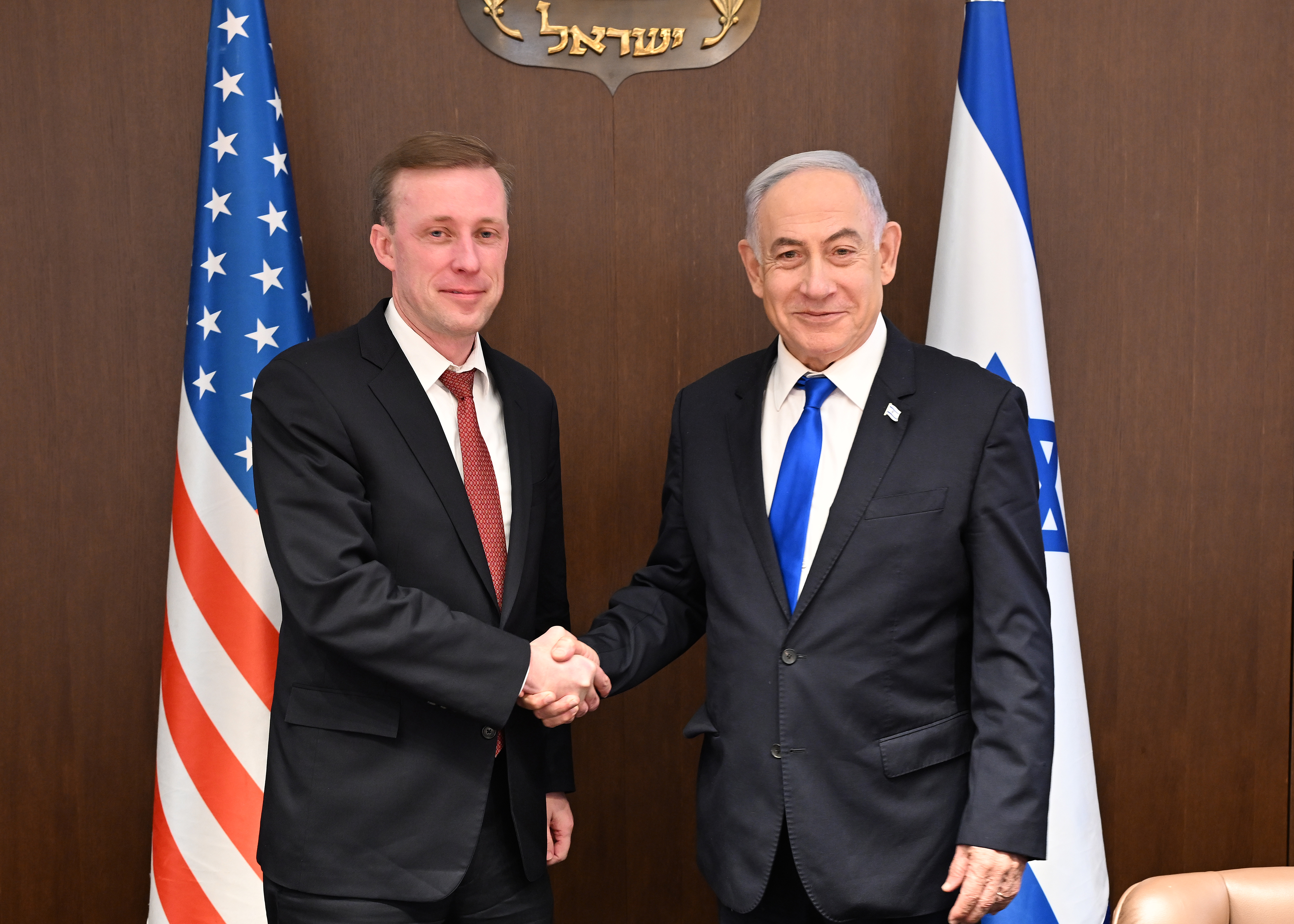
U.S. National Security Adviser Jake Sullivan with Benjamin Netanyahu, 19 May 2024

On 2 May, Hamas outlined three points of Israel's proposal that it disagreed with. On 4 and 5 May, talks were hosted in Cairo, which were attended by Egyptians, Qataris, Hamas, and a US delegation led by CIA director William Burns. Although Hamas also sent a delegation, the Americans don't directly talk to Hamas, but communicate their proposals through intermediaries. Benjamin Netanyahu decided to not send an Israeli delegation.

Previous negotiation had failed because Hamas sought a permanent end to the war, while Israel would only agree to a temporary ceasefire. The Egyptians and Qataris aimed to bridge this divide by separating the ceasefire into three phases, with negotiations for a "sustainable calm" happening only in the second phase. The wording "sustainable calm" was crafted by the Americans so that Israel would not have to commit to a permanent ceasefire upfront. The United States official hoped that the first 42-day ceasefire would lead to something "more enduring". On 6 May, John Kirby, an advisor to Biden, confirmed that CIA Director William Burns had played a key role in the negotiations that brought about the proposal.

On 4 May, Qatar and Egypt presented the three-stage proposal. It was accepted on 5 May by Hamas. Netanyahu said the proposal was "far" from Israeli demands, but promised to continue negotiations. Israeli and Palestinian teams went to Cairo for further discussions. The Palestinian team included Hamas, Palestinian Islamic Jihad, and the Popular Front. Hamas said it was committed to the 5 May deal it accepted, but would not entertain changes to the deal. On 9 May, Palestinian and Israeli negotiating teams, along with CIA Director Richard Burns, all left Cairo without an agreement.

=== Late May to June 2024: "Israeli proposal" and United Nations Security Council resolution ===
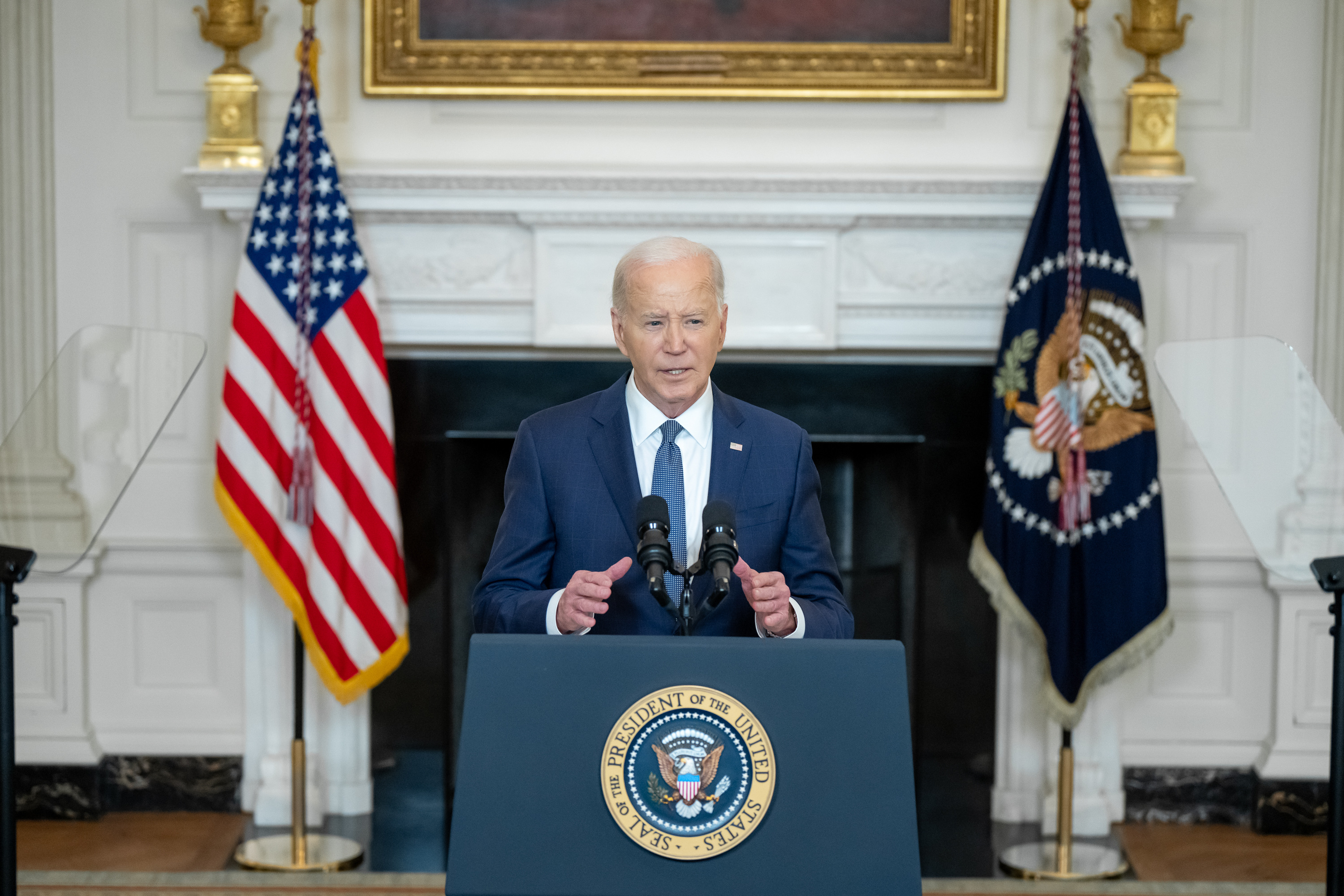
In May 2024, U.S. president Joe Biden announced a ceasefire proposal in line with the one drafted by mediators from Egypt and Qatar and endorsed by Hamas earlier that month.

On 31 May 2024, Biden announced a proposal that he said was drafted by Israel's war cabinet in the State Dining Room of the White House, endorsing the plan. Biden incorrectly stated it was an Israeli proposal. According to Al Jazeera, Israel's proposal is nearly identical to the Egyptian-Qatari agreement. The U.S. shared the plan with Hamas through Qatar. Blinken spoke with his counterparts in Egypt, Qatar, and the United Arab Emirates to garner support for the proposal. The United States, Egypt, and Qatar issued a joint statement on 1 June urging Israel and Hamas to finalize an agreement. According to The Wall Street Journal, Hamas leader Yahya Sinwar's intentions to secure the longevity of the organization conflict with Israel's intentions to defeat Hamas. United States National Security Council spokesman John Kirby stated Israel would agree to the proposal if Hamas accepts the deal. The following day, an Israeli official stated a permanent ceasefire would "only happen after our objectives are met including destroying Hamas' military and governing capabilities".

According to U.S. officials, Netanyahu is unwilling to support a ceasefire and the release of hostages out of concerns that he will lose his premiership. Hamas expressed interest in operating within a proposal that includes a withdrawal of Israeli forces, a permanent truce, the return of Palestinians, and a prisoner exchange. On 1 June, Netanyahu stated the war would not end until Hamas is defeated militarily and operationally and a permanent ceasefire as a "nonstarter". On 2 June, an aide to Netanyahu stated Israel agreed to Biden's three-phase ceasefire proposal, but reserved that it was "not a good deal". s

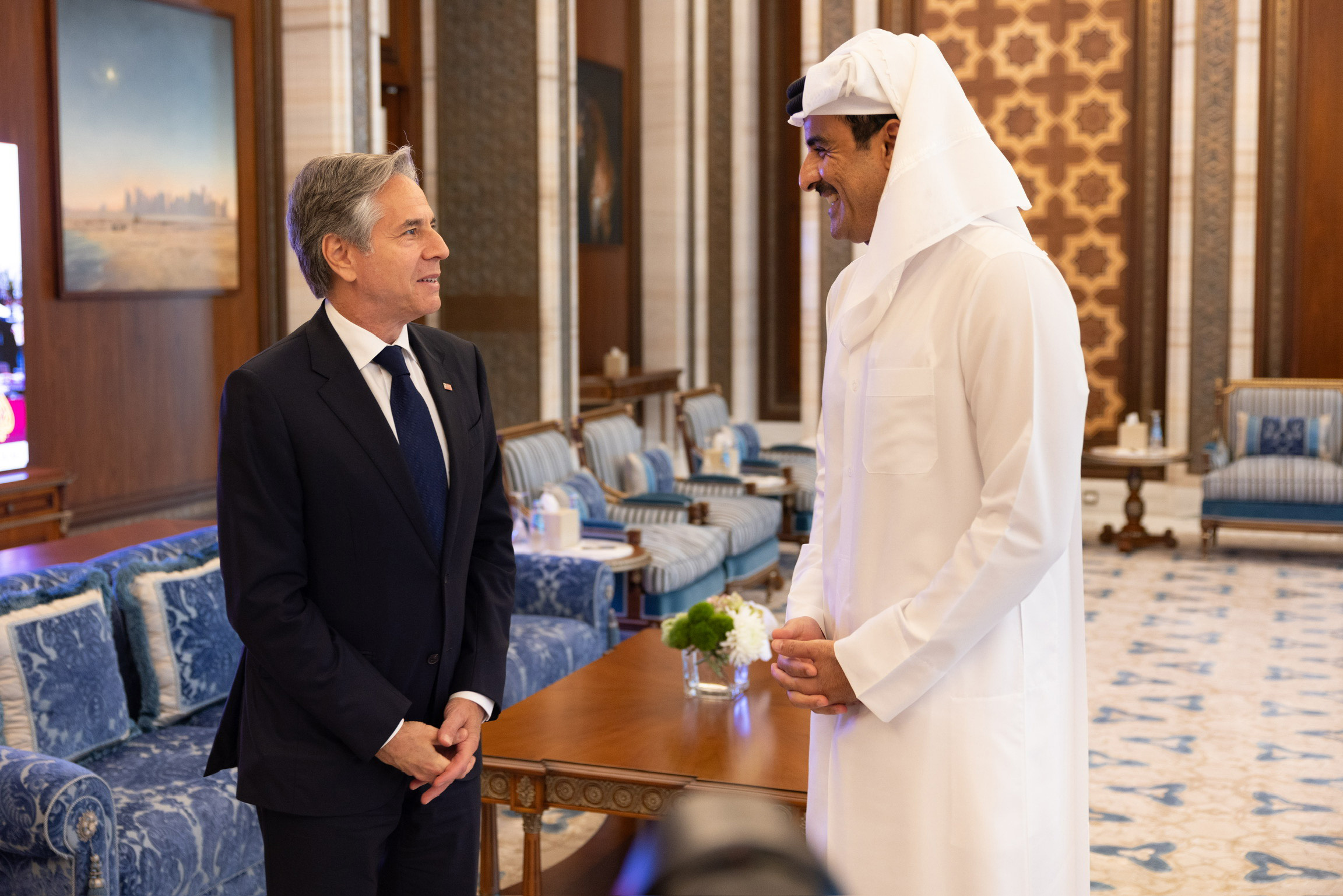
Qatar's Emir Tamim bin Hamad Al Thani meets with Antony Blinken, 12 June 2024

On 10 June, the UN Security Council adopted Resolution 2735 backing the 31 May proposal, noting Israel's acceptance thereof and calling on Hamas to accept the proposed agreement as well. The following day, Hamas and Islamic Jihad replied to the resolution with amendments to the proposal (according to one diplomat these amendments were about a timeline for a permanent ceasefire and troop withdrawals) and the Office of the Israeli Prime Minister stated, "The claim that Israel agreed to end the war before achieving all its goals is a total lie". The United States responded to the Palestinians' proposed amendments by calling them unworkable. The day after that, Hamas denied adding any new ideas to the ceasefire proposal. When the text of Hamas' response was made public on 14 June, it was revealed that the main difference between Hamas' stance compared to that of Israel was that Hamas wanted the deal to guarantee that the second stage of it will actually happen; and that the initital ceasefire will remain in force until it happens. The Israeli proposal said only that the mediators will make "every effort" that negotiations on specifics of the second stage will continue; but in case they do not continue, the initial ceasefire, and all other provisions of the first stage, would automatically expire six weeks after it started.

On 21 June, Hamas stated, "The priority is to stop the criminal war on our people", and three days later, Netanyahu stated Israel would only accept a partial ceasefire that would not end the war.

=== July 2024 to January 2025: Philadelphi Corridor ===
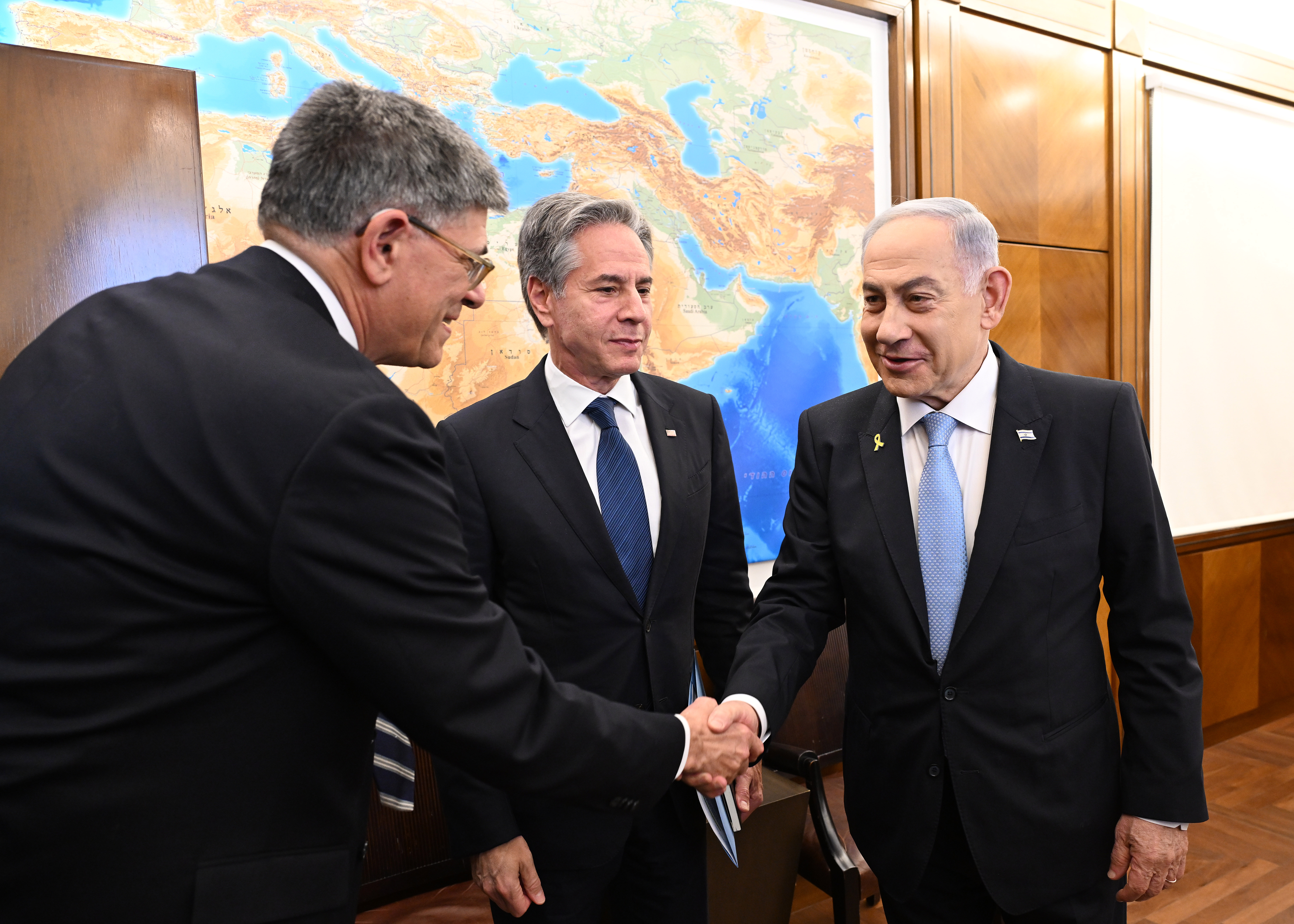
Israeli Prime Minister Benjamin Netanyahu with US ambassador to Israel Jack Lew (left) and US Secretary of State Antony Blinken on 19 August 2024

In July, Netanyahu announced that Israel would not end its occupation of the Philadelphi Corridor, which constitutes Gaza Strip's border with Egypt. This new demand contradicted the May proposal announced by Biden. The May proposal envisioned Israel withdrawing from the entirety of the Gaza Strip in the second stage; back in May, Israel had not yet captured the corridor. Hamas rejected Netanyahu's new demand, calling on Israel to "stick to agreed ceasefire plan."

Palestinians, including Hamas, see the demand for occupying the corridor as the beginning of a lasting military occupation and a return of Israeli settlements to Gaza. Indeed, Israeli cabinet ministers in Gaza have openly stated they want Israelis to settle Gaza. Netanyahu said he wanted to maintain the occupation of the corridor in order to prevent weapons smuggling, but others said this demand made no sense and was more likely being used by Netanyahu so he could cling to power. Defense Minister Yoav Gallant said the Israeli military could always recapture the corridor in eight hours if it needed to. In addition, an Israeli general warned it would be dangerous to leave Israeli soldiers permanently stationed there.

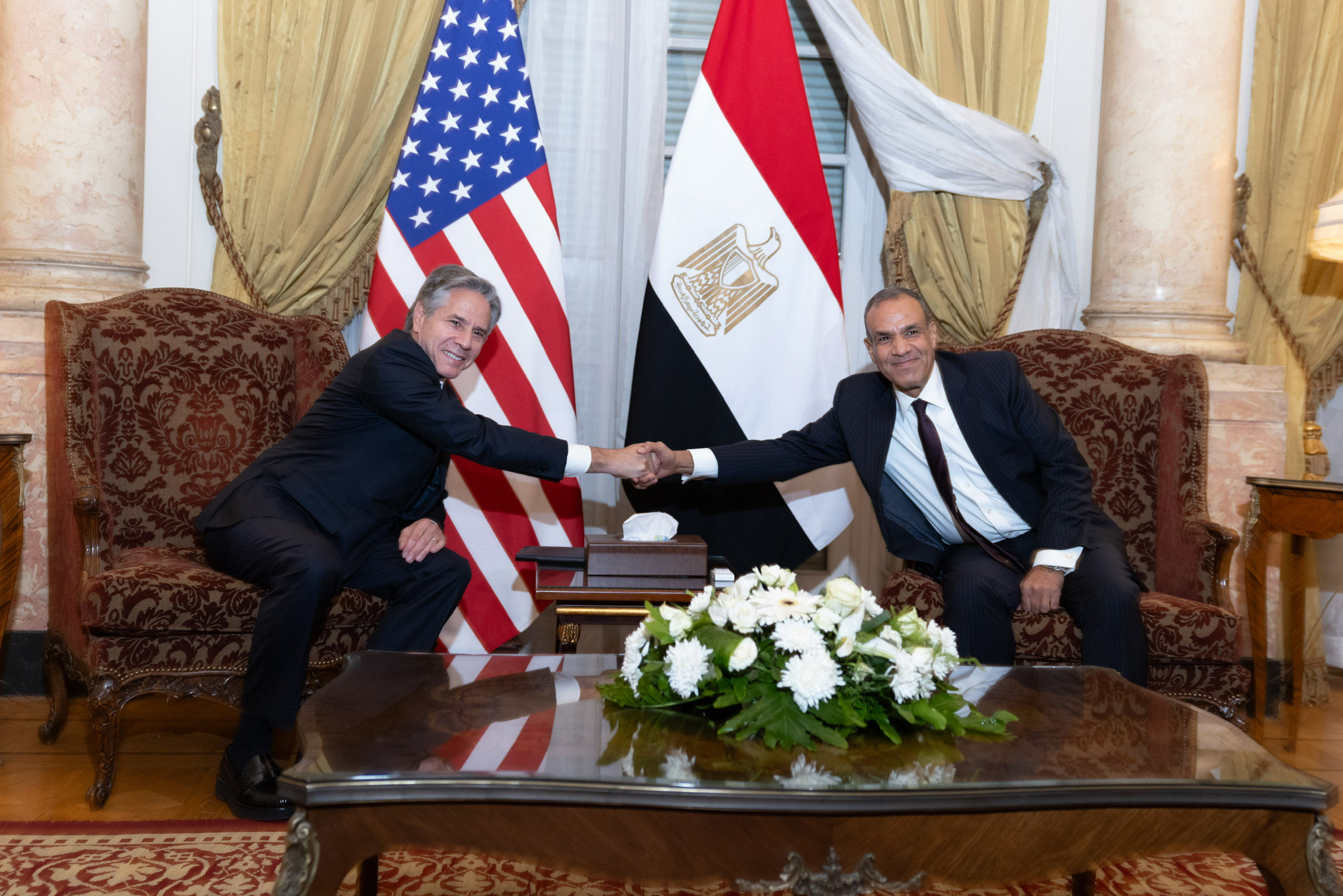
Antony Blinken meets with Egyptian Foreign Minister Badr Abdelatty in Cairo, Egypt, 18 September 2024

In addition to the Palestinians, Egypt was also deeply opposed to a permanent Israeli occupation of the Philadelphi corridor, although it would tolerate a phased Israeli withdrawal from the corridor. Egypt sees an Israeli presence at the corridor to be a violation of the 1979 Egypt-Israel Peace Treaty, under which each side is allowed to have only a small number of soldiers in the border zone. At one point in August, Egypt even refused to pass along an Israeli proposal to Hamas, deeming the proposal to be objectionable.

Another complicating factor were Israel's military continued operations in Gaza City, which negotiators warned could have "disastrous repercussions" for their talks.

In an early-September 2024 Haaretz report, an unnamed coalition partner of Netanyahu stated that the Israeli PM had decided several weeks earlier he did not want a ceasefire deal. A report by Channel 12 found Netanyahu had sought "relentlessly" to block a ceasefire deal. Yedioth Ahronoth stated that Netanyahu had sabotaged a hostage ceasefire deal in July 2024 by adding a number of additional last minute demands. A report by U.S. authorities privately acknowledged in mid-September 2024 that the Biden Administration would fail to negotiate a ceasefire before the end of its term. According to unnamed U.S. officials, Biden believed Netanyahu did not want a ceasefire and was rather extending the conflict to help both himself and Trump politically.

In early October 2024, U.S. officials said that they believed that Sinwar was no longer interested in a ceasefire deal with Israel, saying he had become "inflexible" and "fatalistic" as the war had progressed, adding that he was hoping for it to expand into a wider regional conflict involving Iran.

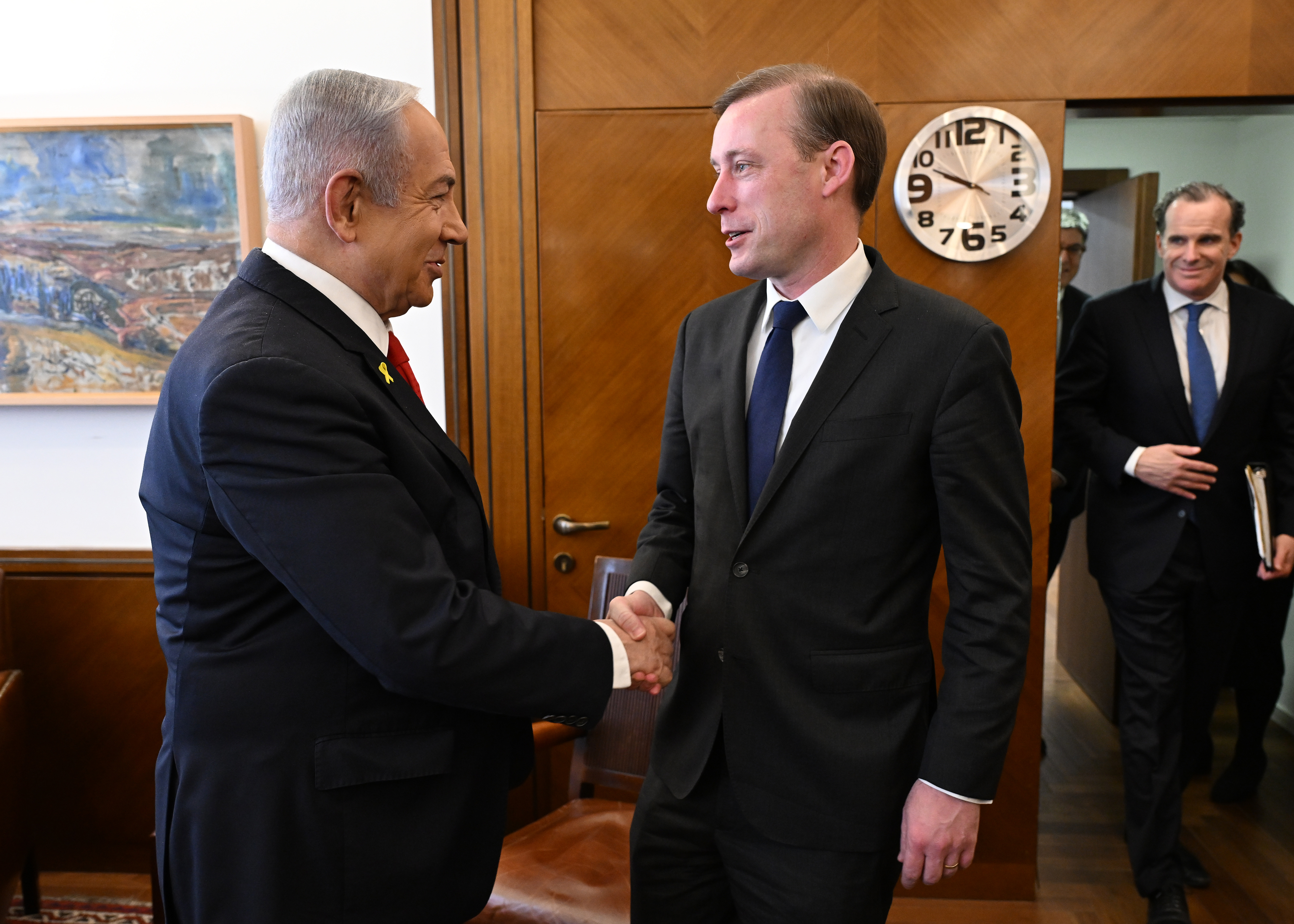
Benjamin Netanyahu with Biden's National Security Adviser Jake Sullivan and White House Middle East advisor Brett McGurk (right), 12 December 2024

In November 2024, Israeli Finance Minister Bezalel Smotrich stated, "In my estimation, a political settlement will be reached by the end of the year". Senior Israeli officials have suggested that the Israeli government is not seeking a hostage deal but is instead seeking the annexation of large parts of the Gaza Strip. Following the election of Trump as US president in November 2024, it was reported that the new president-elect was striving to reach a ceasefire and hostage release deal before inauguration on 20 January 2025. In addition, Trump publicly threatened Hamas with unspecified retaliation if hostages were not released.

On 17 December, it was reported that Netanyahu decided to travel to Cairo to promote a ceasefire deal. On the following day, it was reported gaps were narrowing. On 13 January 2025, it was reported that the parties have reached the final draft of the agreement. The Palestinian Islamic Jihad stated that it was involved in the final negotiations. On 16 January 2025, the day after the ceasefire was announced but before it was approved, Israeli military launched across the Gaza Strip killed 86 and injured over 250 Palestinians. On 17 January, a deal for a 42-day ceasefire was achieved, with the deal, which also calls for the release of Israeli hostages, then being approved by the security cabinet in an afternoon vote. Later in the day, the deal was given full cabinet approval and signed by its negotiators.

The deal was achieved through negotiations mediated by the United States, Egypt, and Qatar. CNN reported that both the Biden administration and U.S. president-elect Donald Trump's incoming administration played equal roles, with the role of the former administration facilitated by Middle Eastern negotiator Brett McGurk, and were willing to work together and compromise due to a desire for a solution prior to the latter's inauguration. Prior to its conclusion, Trump repeatedly warned that failure to release the hostages, including seven American citizens, before his 20 January inauguration would result in "hell to pay". A diplomat told The Washington Post that Trump pressured the Israeli side to accept the deal. Israeli sources also state that the incoming Trump administration revived the talks for a ceasefire. The New York Times also remarked on Biden's heavy involvement in the negotiations, mentioning particularly how McGurk collaborated with Trump's future special envoy to the Middle East, Steve Witkoff. Witkoff said that Biden's advisor McGurk was "in the lead", which The New York Times reported both camps deemed was accurate and that Biden's team did most of the work.

== Provisions ==
The proposal was divided into three stages, each 42 days (six weeks) long. Its aims were the release of all Israeli captives – whether civilian or military, alive or deceased; release of some number of Palestinian prisoners; return of "sustainable calm"; and the end of Israeli occupation and siege of the Gaza Strip.

=== First stage ===
In this stage, Hamas would release 33 Israeli captives. It would start with releasing all living Israeli children (under 19), all living civilian women, all living elderly (age 50 or over) Israelis, and all living female Israeli soldiers, followed by a number of civilian men under the age of 50 who were suffering from injuries or other health issues. If the total number of living children, women, elderly, female soldiers, and sick or injured men was less than 33, then it would make up for that difference by releasing deceased bodies of Israelis.

In return, Israel would release up to 1,904 Palestinian security prisoners, including 737 serving life terms. Israel would have to allow the entry of "sufficient" quantities of humanitarian aid: 600 trucks per day, of which 300 are for the north. Included in this were 50 fuel trucks "including the fuel necessary for operating the power plant, trade, and equipment needed for rubble removal, rehabilitation and operation of hospitals, health centres and bakeries in all areas of the Gaza Strip".

Simultaneous to the captive exchanges, displaced unarmed Palestinians would be able to return to their homes in Gaza, and Israel would gradually withdraw from some (but not all) parts of the Gaza Strip. Israel would not conduct military flights over Gaza for 10–12 hours per day.

=== Second stage ===
In the second stage, Hamas would have released all remaining alive male Israelis, including both civilians and soldiers. In return, Israel would release an agreed upon number of Palestinian prisoners. The prisoner exchanges would be conditioned on both parties agreeing to and announcing a "sustainable calm" and the withdrawal of remaining Israeli soldiers from the Gaza Strip.

=== Third stage ===
In this stage, Hamas would have released all the remains of deceased Israeli captives, in exchange for Israel releasing the remains of deceased Palestinian bodies that it holds. Israel would end the blockade of the Gaza Strip and Hamas would not rebuild its military capabilities.

=== Supervision and guarantors ===
Initially, it was proposed that activities in the Gaza Strip would be supervised by Egypt, Qatar, and the United Nations, who along with the United States would guarantee the proposal and its provisions. As of February 2025, the government of Israel continued to insist that in its implementation of the "second-phase" (see supra) of the peace deal, the Gaza Strip must be de-militarized and that the Palestinian Authority (PA) was in no position to govern the Gaza Strip.

== Ceasefire and hostage/prisoner exchanges ==
=== Early hours ===
A ceasefire agreement between Israel and Hamas was also reached on 17 January 2025. The agreement was confirmed by Israeli Prime Minister Netanyahu's office shortly after midnight on 18 January local time, and went into effect on 19 January.

The ceasefire was to go into effect at 8:30 am on 19 January. On the morning of 19 January, Israel killed 19 people in the Gaza Strip. Israel said that was because Hamas had not provided the names of the three hostages to be released; Hamas said it was forced to delay giving the names due to "technical field reasons". Netanyahu stated that if talks for the next stage broke down, "We retain the right to return to the war, if necessary, with the backing of the United States."

=== First exchange (19–20 January) ===
On 19 January Hamas transferred three female hostages to the Red Cross: Emily Damari, Romi Gonen, and Doron Steinbrecher; the Red Cross brought them to Israeli positions in Gaza. In return, the next day, Israel released 69 women and 21 children to the West Bank and Jerusalem. The Palestinian women and children reported being starved by the Israeli Prison Service; one woman had lost 14 kg while in prison. Israel said that all of the 90 Palestinians were "terrorists". Many of the Palestinians had been neither tried nor convicted. Some of the Palestinians had been arrested for making pro-Palestinians social media posts, or taking part in pro-Palestinian protests. The Palestinians said they were hostages just like the Israeli women, as they had been arrested by Israel after the October 7 attacks, without any credible charges, apparently for the purpose of being used in a prisoner exchange with Hamas. Multiple released Palestinian women said they were tortured in prison; the Israeli Prison Service denied allegations of torturing Palestinians.

The release of Israelis was codenamed Operation "Wings of Freedom" by the IDF. Afterward, following the agreement, hundreds of aid trucks carrying food and fuel entered the Gaza Strip through Israel and Egypt.

=== Second exchange (25 January) ===
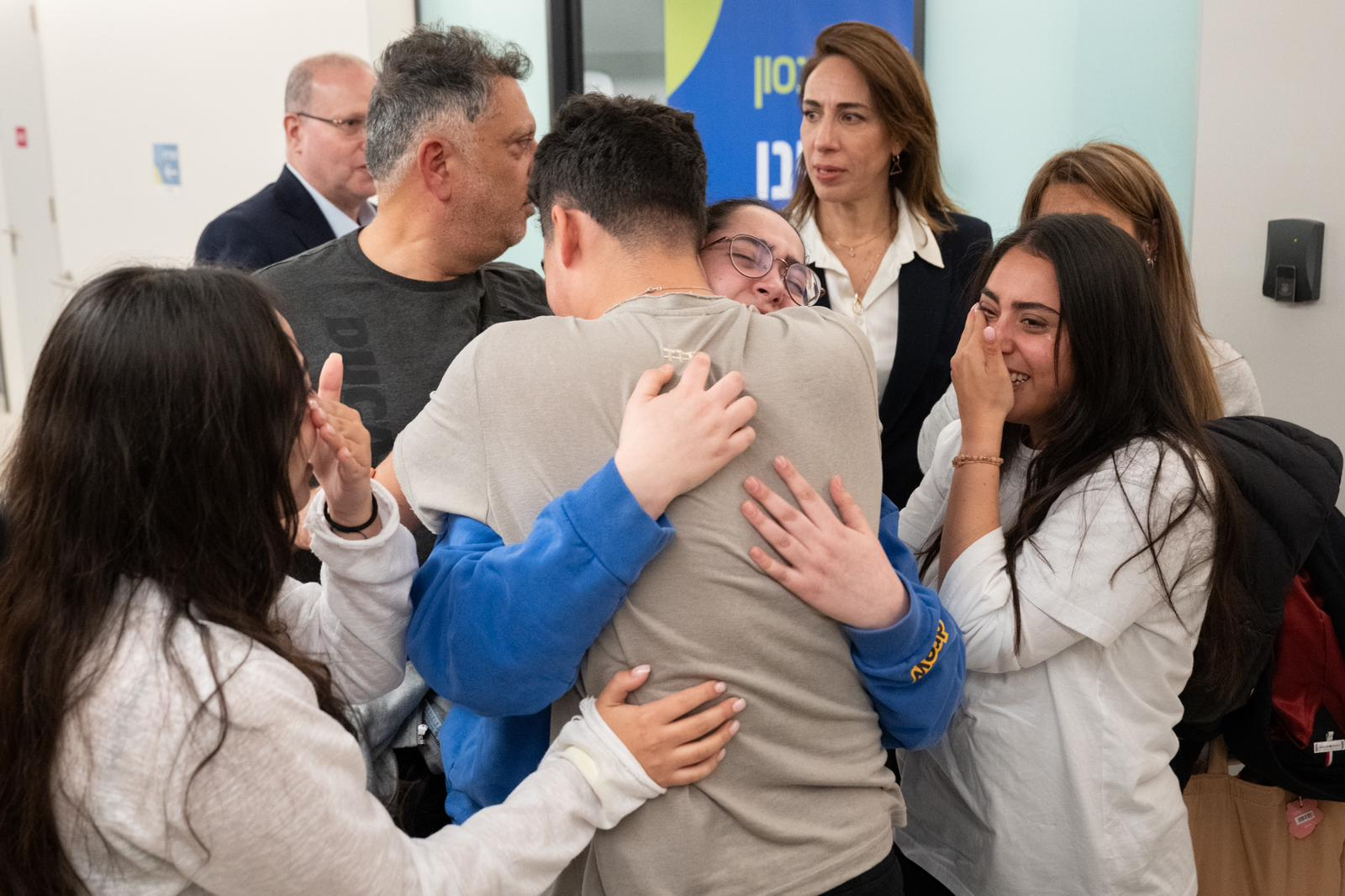
Liri Albag in the first meeting with her family after being released from Hamas captivity on 25 January 2025.

On 25 January, Hamas released four female soldiers: Karina Ariev, Daniella Gilboa, Naama Levy, and Liri Albag; they were brought to a stage in Palestine Square, recorded smiling and waving and handed a bag of items to take back to Israel. In return, Israel released 200 Palestinian prisoners. Upon their release, several of the released Palestinians said they had been tortured, starved, endured beatings and humiliated while in Israeli captivity. Of the Palestinian prisoners, 121 were serving life sentences, some were children, while others were held under "administrative detention" – a practice under which Israel holds Palestinians without trial for years on end, on the basis of secret evidence. Among those included militants responsible for offenses in the First Intifada, and those responsible for the Hebrew University bombing, which killed 9 people. Around 70 of them were released into Egypt.

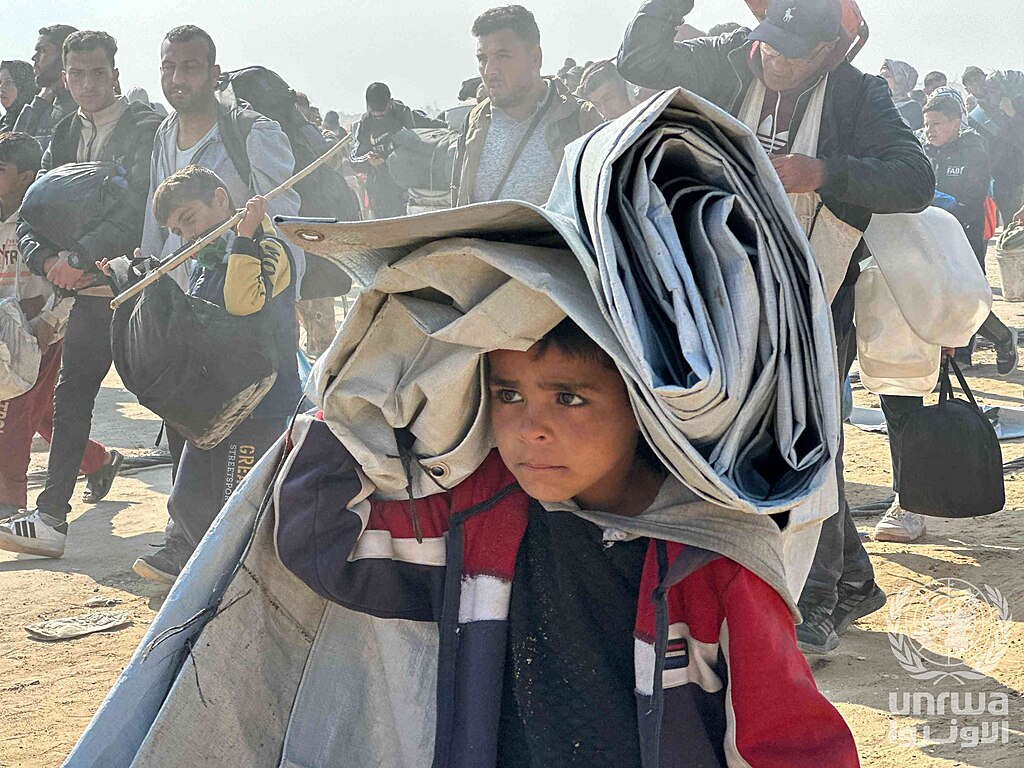
Return of displaced people via Al-Rasheed Street after ceasefire, January 2025, Gaza Strip

=== Third exchange (30 January) ===
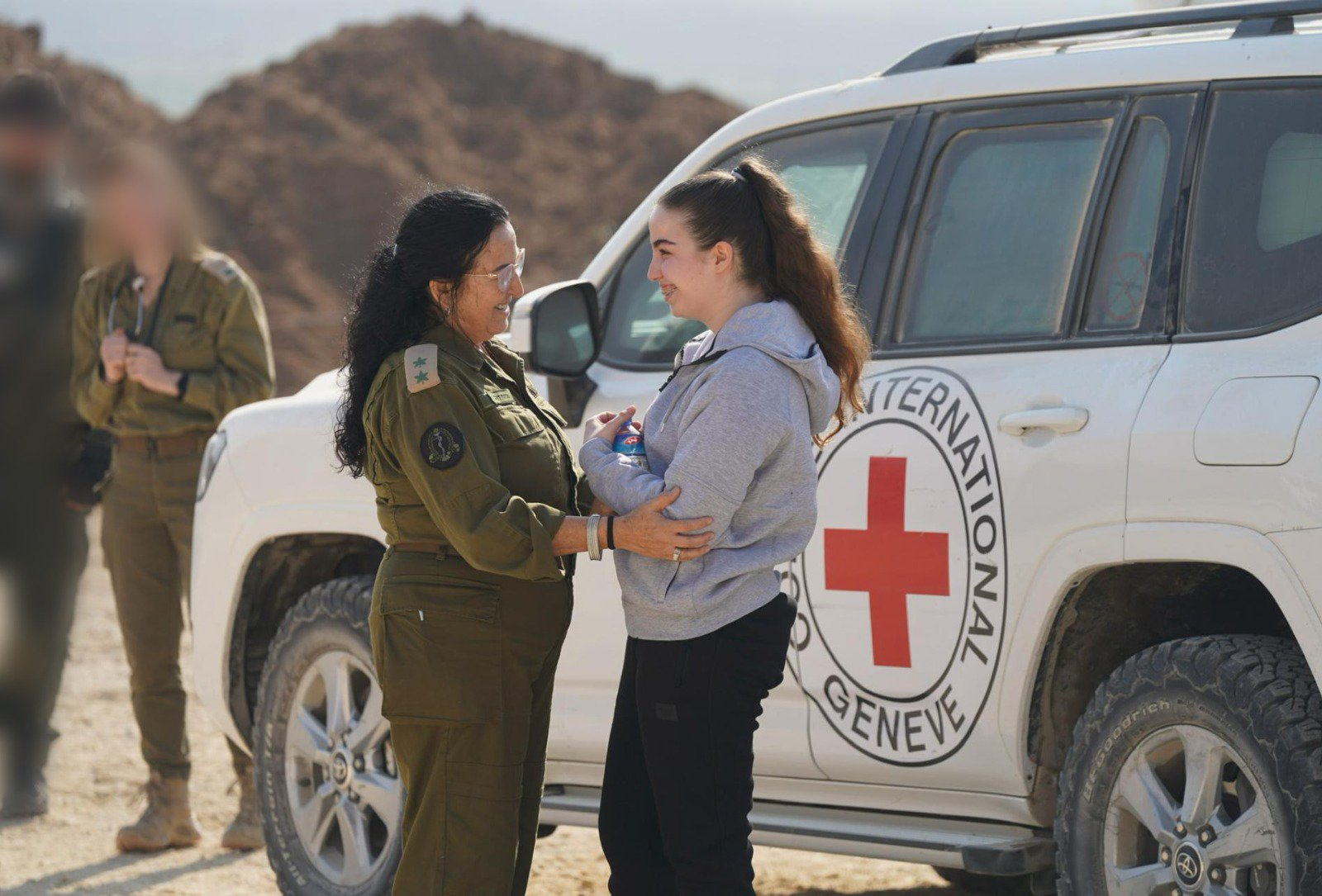
The arrival of Agam Berger to IDF forces after her release from Hamas captivity on 30 January 2025.

On 29 January, Hamas released the names of the three hostages expected to be released on 30 January: Arbel Yehoud, Agam Berger and Gadi Moses. Additionally, according to information presented to the mediators in the deal, five Thai citizens who had been kidnapped and held by Hamas are also set to be released on the same day. On 30 January, Palestinian Islamic Jihad (PIJ), accompanied by Hamas, the Popular Resistance Committee, and the Palestinian Mujahideen Movement released IDF hostage Agam Berger, civilian hostages Arbel Yehud and 80 year old Gadi Mozes and five Thai civilian hostages: Pongsak Thenna, Sathian Suwannakham, Watchara Sriaoun, Bannawat Seathao, and Surasak Lamnau. Berger was released separately with the other seven hostages released two hours later with the handoff in front of the bombed remains of Yahya Sinwar's home, with reporters and recorded video showing chaotic pushing and chanting for Hamas and Sinwar.

The Israeli government delayed the release of Palestinian prisoners until the safety of future releases can be guaranteed as a protest of the reportedly chaotic handover of several hostages in Khan Yunis. Later, Netanyahu's office said that mediators have assured the safety of future release of hostages. 110 Palestinian prisoners were released by Israel, including 32 with life sentences and 30 minors. 23 prisoners who were serving life sentences for more serious crimes, like Mohammed Abu Warda, who had helped organize the 1996 Jaffa Road bus bombings that killed over 40 people, were transferred to Egypt prior to further deportation.

=== Fourth exchange (1 February) ===
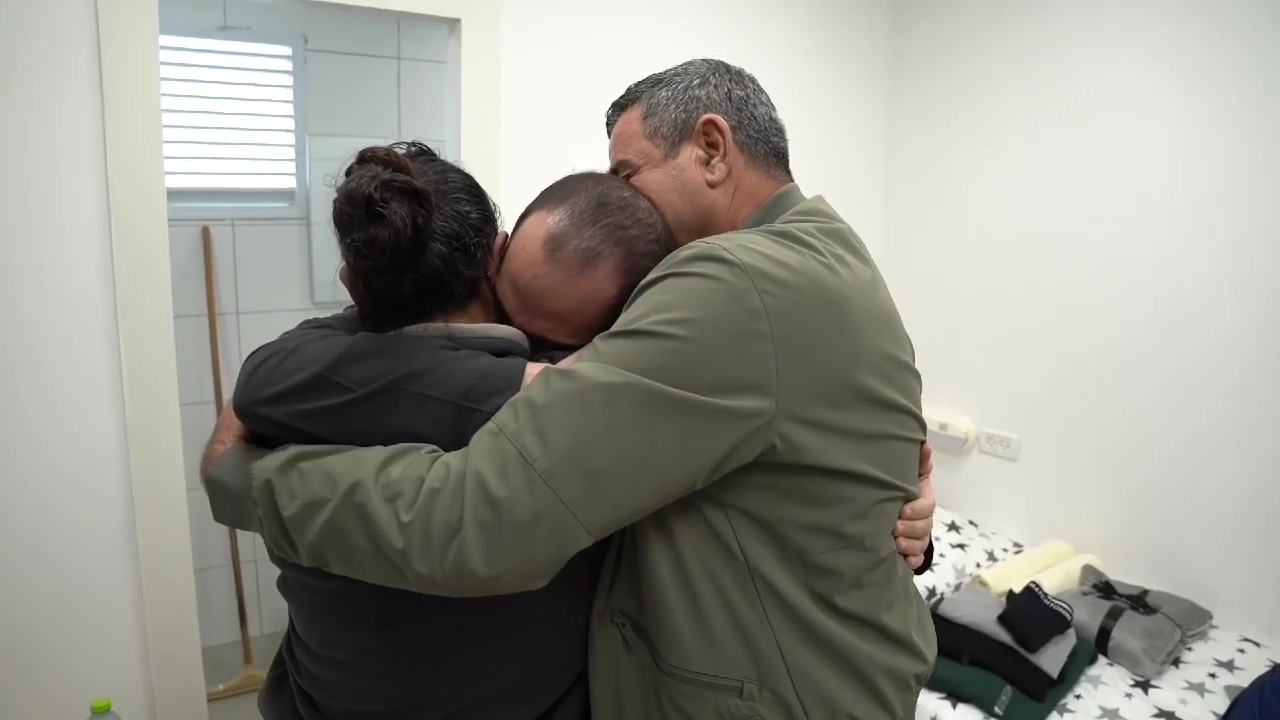
Yarden Bibas, whose wife and children were later returned dead, meets his father and sister for the first time after his release from Hamas captivity on 1 February 2025.

On 31 January, Hamas announced that three mixed nationality civilians; French-Israeli Ofer Kalderon, American-Israeli Keith Siegel and Israeli-Argentine Yarden Bibas were to be released the next day. On 1 February, hostages Keith Siegel, Ofer Kalderon and Yarden Bibas were released by Hamas. Haitham Al-Hawajri, the local commander of the Shati camp battalion of Hamas oversaw the exchange. Later, the IDF acknowledged that Hawajri, whom they claimed that it assassinated in 2023, was not killed in its strike.

183 Palestinian prisoners were released by Israel, of whom seven were serving life sentences and were transferred to Egypt prior to their deportation. Among those released was Shadi Amouri, who was convicted of involvement in the Megiddo Junction bus bombing which killed 17 Israelis and injured 43.

=== Fifth exchange (8 February) ===
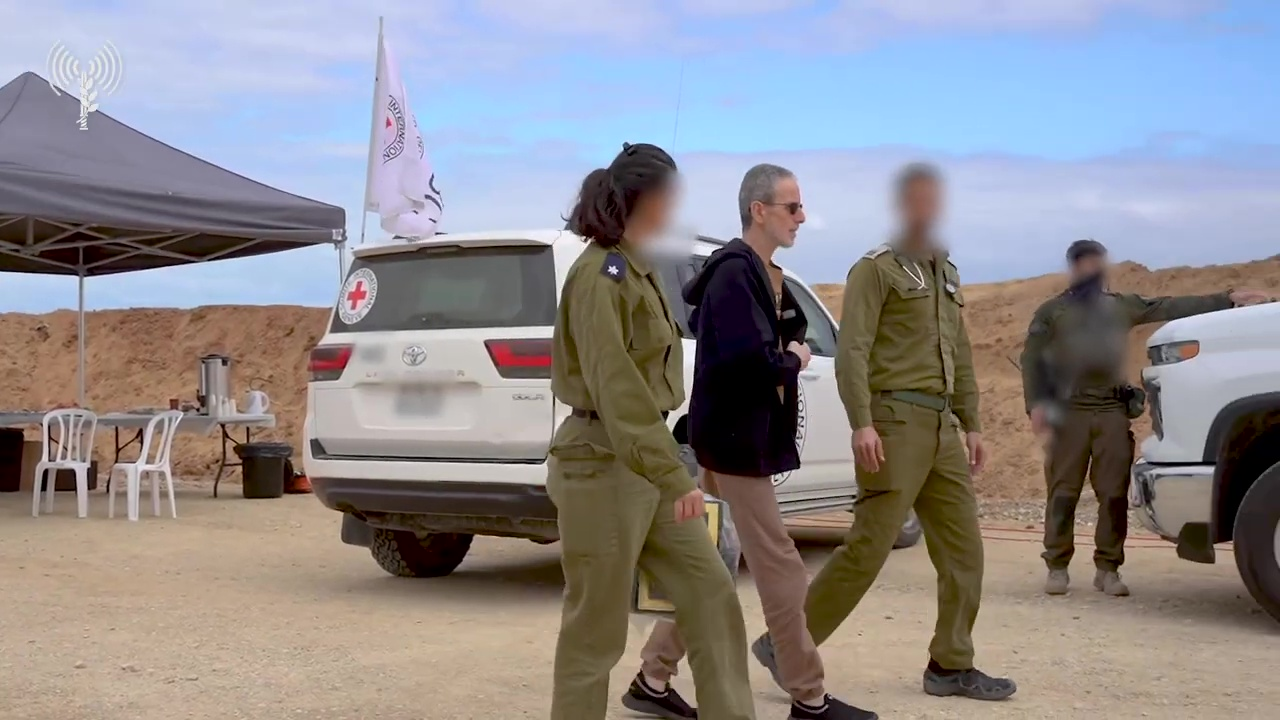
Released hostage Ohad Ben Ami with IDF forces after his release from captivity on 8 February 2025.

On 7 February, Hamas announced that it will release Israeli civilian hostages Eli Sharabi, Ohad Ben Ami and Or Levy the next day, and they were all released the following day. Israel released 183 Palestinian prisoners, of which seven were transferred to Egypt prior to their deportation. The Israeli hostages appeared frail, thin and gaunt and were forced to deliver public speeches expressing gratitude to Hamas, their captors. Seven of the Palestinians were hospitalized immediately after release; some of them showed signs of physical torture on their bodies (including rib fractures from being beaten). Eighteen of the released Palestinians had been convicted by Israeli courts of terrorism. Amnesty International said that at least of those released by Israel had been convicted in "a grossly unfair trial" based upon undisclosed evidence. Israel said the released were responsible for the 2004 Beersheba bus bombings which killed 16 Israelis and other attacks during the Second Intifada.

The dire medical conditions of both the Israelis and Palestinians released sparked strong reactions. Euro-Mediterranean Human Rights Monitor criticized Israeli treatment of Palestinians in captivity. The US President Donald Trump Steffen Seibert, the German ambassador to Israel, and Simon Walters, the British ambassador to Israel all criticized Hamas' treatment of Israelis in captivity. Pro-Israeli social media accounts drew comparisons between Israelis released by Hamas and Holocaust survivors who suffered extreme starvation known as Muselmann. Pro-Palestinian social media accounts argued that Palestinians released by Israel showed physical signs of starvation and torture, while Israelis released by Hamas appeared relatively healthier.

The day after the exchange, which was the half-way point of the 42 day duration of Phase 1 of the agreement, Israel withdrew from the Netzarim Corridor, leaving Israel in control over only "a small sliver of land in southern Gaza, near the Egyptian border, and a buffer zone along the Israeli border." The Israeli troops were replaced by private US and Egyptian security personnel, armed and dressed in military fatigues, who manned checkpoints along the corridor.

=== Sixth exchange (15 February) ===
On 14 February, PIJ announced that it will release Israeli-Russian hostage Alexander Trufanov, while Hamas announced that it will release Israeli-American hostage Sagui Dekel-Chen and Israeli-Argentinean hostage Yair Horn the next day. All three are civilians and were abducted during the Nir Oz attack. They were released on 15 February at a makeshift stage in Khan Yunis "close to the house" of the former leader of Hamas, Yahya Sinwar, in front of a crowd. The stolen vehicle belonging to Yair Horn's brother, Eitan Horn (who himself was still being held hostage as of 15 February), was identified at the scene of the hostage release.

Israel reciprocated by releasing 369 Palestinians. Some of the released were struggling to walk, and others showed signs of physical torture. Many Palestinians had lost significant weight and confirmed they were denied food in Israeli captivity; one Palestinian went to an Israeli prison weighing 95 kg but came out weighing only 45 kg. The prisoners were released with Israeli Prison Service (IPS) issued sweatshirts saying in Arabic "Never forgive, never forget" along with the Star of David and the logo of the IPS. Some of the released prisoners threw their sweatshirts on the ground and burned them upon arrival in Gaza. Hamas criticized the sweatshirt saying that the messages on the shirts were racist. An anonymous source within the Israeli government also condemned the shirts saying that they were "problematic" and "that the political echelon was not informed about the decision".

Of the 369 Palestinians released, 333 had been held by Israel under administrative detention (a practice that allows Israel to imprison Palestinians without any formal charges or trial). The rest of the 36 were serving life sentences for attacks that took the lives of Israelis. Of the thirty-six who were serving life sentences, twelve were released to the West Bank and East Jerusalem, with the rest exiled abroad. These Palestinians had been convicted in Israeli courts of partaking in attacks that killed Israeli civilians, such as Seafood Market attack, the 2002 Hadera attack, and the Jaffa Street bombing. One of the Palestinian convicts released said he was wrongfully convicted.

=== Seventh Hamas release (20–21 February) ===
On 18 February, Hamas spokesperson Khalil al-Hayya announced that the bodies of four hostages, including the remaining members of the Bibas family, will be released on 20 February, and six living hostages will be released on 22 February, including Avera Mengistu and Hisham al-Sayed, who were who were captured in 2014 and 2015 respectively after they crossed into Gaza. In exchange, Israel would release 600 Palestinian prisoners and detainees, and all women and those under the age of 19 arrested since October 2024, and will allow rubble-clearing equipment into Gaza. Some of those to be released are serving life sentences for attacks against Israel and others were detained without charges or sentencing.

On 20 February, four coffins said to contain the bodies of Israeli hostages Shiri Bibas and her children (4 years old Ariel and 9 months old Kfir) and 83 years old Oded Lifshitz were handed over by Hamas. The day before the exchange, the Red Cross called for safeguarding the privacy and dignity of those returning: "We must be clear: any degrading treatment during release operations is unacceptable", they said. In the exchange, large crowds gathered as masked Hamas gunmen led a ceremony on a stage with four black-draped coffins with the photos of the victims and inscription on the adult-sized coffins "Date of Arrest"—7 October 2023, the day they were abducted from their homes, alongside posters in Hebrew and English. One depicted Israeli Prime Minister Benjamin Netanyahu as a fanged vampire with the hostages' photos displayed beneath him, while another threatened that renewed war in Gaza would mean more hostages returned in coffins. Alongside the stage was what resembled an improvised weapons exhibition for children and teenagers, where they were allowed to handle firearms and pose for photos and videos.

During the release itself, the Red Cross refused to participate, and it was only after Hamas threatened to withhold the return of the bodies unless the organization took part that a Red Cross representative stepped onto the stage and signed the documents. The United Nations rights chief condemned the ceremony as "abhorrent," stating that it was conducted in violation of international law: "Under international law, any handover of the remains of the deceased must comply with the prohibition of cruel, inhuman or degrading treatment, ensuring respect for the dignity of the deceased and their families".

Israeli forces in Gaza received the bodies of the hostages, placing them in coffins draped with Israeli flags and conducting a brief memorial ceremony. A military rabbi recited the traditional Jewish mourner's prayer, followed by ceremonial gunfire. The coffins were then transported in a convoy across the border into Israel. Along the route, Israelis gathered in southern Israel to pay their respects as the procession made its way to a forensic institute in Tel Aviv, where the bodies are undergoing examination for official identification and determination of the cause of death. Upon the coffins' arrival in Israel, Hamas propaganda materials were discovered inside. Israel reached out to the mediators, urging them to take a strong stance against the desecration of the sanctity of the dead.

Later, Oded Lifshitz's family said that his body was identified. The Abu Kabir Forensic Institute chief said that Lifshitz was killed in captivity more than a year ago. The IDF said that forensic tests revealed that one of four bodies handed over by Hamas was not that of hostage Shiri Bibas nor any other Israeli hostage held by Hamas, adding that it identified Ariel Bibas and Kfir Bibas. It demanded Hamas to handover the body of Shiri Bibas. Mujahideen Brigades and Hamas said that the Bibas children were killed in Israeli airstrikes. Israel said that its forensic evidence indicated that the children were "brutally murdered" in Gaza captivity. Israel did agree with Hamas on the time of death, November 2023. Hamas said that Shiri's remains had been mixed with those of other victims following an Israeli airstrike and said that it will examine allegations over Shiri's remains and asked Israel to return the body of the Palestinian woman. On 21 February, Hamas stated that it had handed over the remains of Shiri Bibas. On 22 February, the Bibas family said that forensic experts identified her body.

Argentine President Javier Milei declared two days of national mourning beginning on 20 February following the return of the bodies, as the Bibas children held Argentine citizenship. Sabrina Ajmechet, President of the Argentine Chamber of Deputies Commission for Human Rights, wrote: "Two Argentinian babies assassinated because of Hamas terrorism. I hope that never again, after this, I have to hear that what happens in Israel and Gaza is not our concern, of all Argentines".

The Arab-Israeli group 'Atidna' condemned Hamas following the deaths of Shiri Bibas and her two children, accusing Hamas of "an act of barbarism that has no justification". The group called on Arab Israeli political leaders to denounce terrorism, emphasizing, "At such a crucial moment, silence is not an option—our duty as leaders and as a society is to speak out clearly and firmly against murder and terror", and it declared its participation in the Bibas family funeral procession by stating, "We will declare in one united voice: No to terror, no to murder, yes to life and humanity.

=== Eighth Hamas release; delay by Israel (22 February) ===
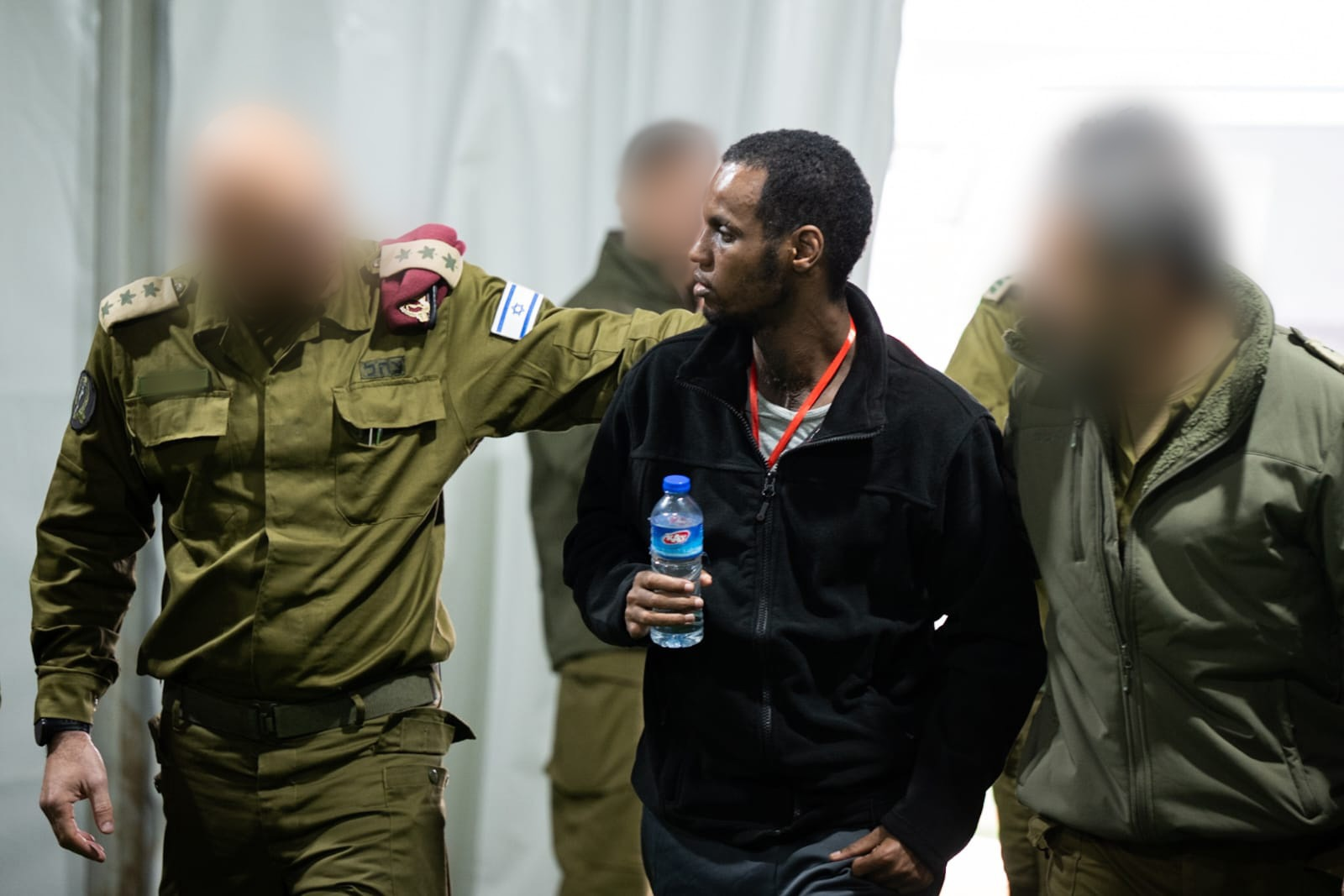
The release of Avera Mengistu after being held in Hamas captivity for ten years.

On 21 February, Hamas said that they will release Israeli hostage Eliya Cohen, American-Israeli hostage Omer Shem Tov, Israeli hostage Omer Wenkert, Israeli Austrian hostage Tal Shoham, Ethiopian Israeli hostage Avera Mengistu and Bedouin Arab Israeli hostage Hisham al-Sayed. Al-Sayed and Mengistu, both with history of mental illness, entered Gaza of their own accord, and were held hostage by Hamas for over a decade. They were released on 22 February. Two hostages, Evyatar David and Guy Gilboa-Dalal, were forced to watch the release ceremony from a nearby van.

Israel refused to release 620 Palestinian prisoners on 22 February, despite the deal stipulating their release; Israel gave the reason for doing so as due to "repeated violations by Hamas — including the ceremonies that demean our hostages and the cynical use of our hostages for propaganda purposes". The Prime Minister Benjamin Netanyahu's office said that the delay will continue "until the next release of hostages is guaranteed, and without the degrading ceremonies". The White House backed Israel's decision to delay the release of the Palestinian prisoners and said: "Given Hamas' barbaric treatment of the hostages, including the hideous parade of the Bibas children's coffins through the streets of Gaza, Israel's decision to delay the release of prisoners is an appropriate response".

=== Final exchange (26–27 February) ===
On 25 February, Israel and Hamas said that they reached a deal to exchange the bodies of Israeli hostages who were agreed to be handed over during the first phase for releasing hundreds of Palestinian prisoners. Israeli media outlet Yedioth Ahronoth reported that bodies of Israeli hostages will be handed over to Egyptian authorities with no public ceremony.

On 26 February, the Al-Nasser Salah al-Deen Brigades and Hamas said that they will hand over the bodies of Israeli hostages Ohad Yahalomi, Tsachi Idan, Itzik Elgarat and Shlomo Mansour. Later, Hamas handed over the bodies of four Israeli hostages. The Israeli PM's office stated that three of those hostages were killed in captivity in Gaza and one of them were killed during the 7 October attacks. Palestinian medics said that Israel returned the body of a Gazan woman that Hamas handed over in place of killed hostage Shiri Bibas to a hospital in Gaza following the return of Bibas's body.

596 Palestinian prisoners were released by Israel, including over 100 with life-sentences and serious offenders. Among them: Alaa al-Din al-Bazyan, who was involved in numerous terrorist attacks, including the 2014 Gush Etzion kidnapping and murder of 3 Israeli teenagers; Ammar Zaban, who played a key role in Hamas's Izz ad-Din al-Qassam Brigades and was accused of the murder of 27 Israelis. On 27 February 46 Palestinian prisoners were released by Israel.

== Violations and deviations by Israel ==
According to Gaza's government media office, as of 12 February, Israel had committed 265 ceasefire violations. The Director-General of the Ministry of Health said that as of 12 February 118 people have been killed in the enclave since the ceasefire began on 19 January and at least 100 people were reported killed by Israeli bombings during the ceasefire period.

As per the reports presented to the United Nations, by March 19, 2025, there have been 1,000 documented ceasefire violations attributed to Israel. Israel has enforced a total blockade on Gaza, obstructing the entry of humanitarian supplies into the region. Additionally, Israeli military aircraft have conducted strikes on civilian zones. As reported by journalists, Israel breached the ceasefire during the night while the Palestinians were asleep, focusing on densely populated areas.

=== Shootings and killings ===
- On 20 January, Al Jazeera reported that at least three Palestinians were killed and eight others were injured by Israeli gunfire in Rafah, despite the ceasefire. In one such case Israeli forces opened fire on and killed 13-year old Zakariya Barbakh, then shot at locals who tried to retrieve his body.
- On 21 January, Wafa reported that two people were wounded by an Israeli drone and gunfire in Gaza.
- On 22 January, Israeli gunboats shelled towards the coast of Gaza city. On the same day, Israeli firing in Rafah's Shaboura camp killed at least one Palestinian and wounded others who were removing rubble from destroyed houses. Later, an IDF spokesperson stated that, in accordance with the ceasefire terms, the IDF opened fire towards armed suspects and masked assailants who approached and posed a threat to IDF forces. During these incidents, a member of the Islamic Jihad organization named Akram 'Atf Farhan Zanoun was killed.
- On 23 January, two Palestinians were killed by Israeli tank fire in Tel al-Sultan refugee camp.
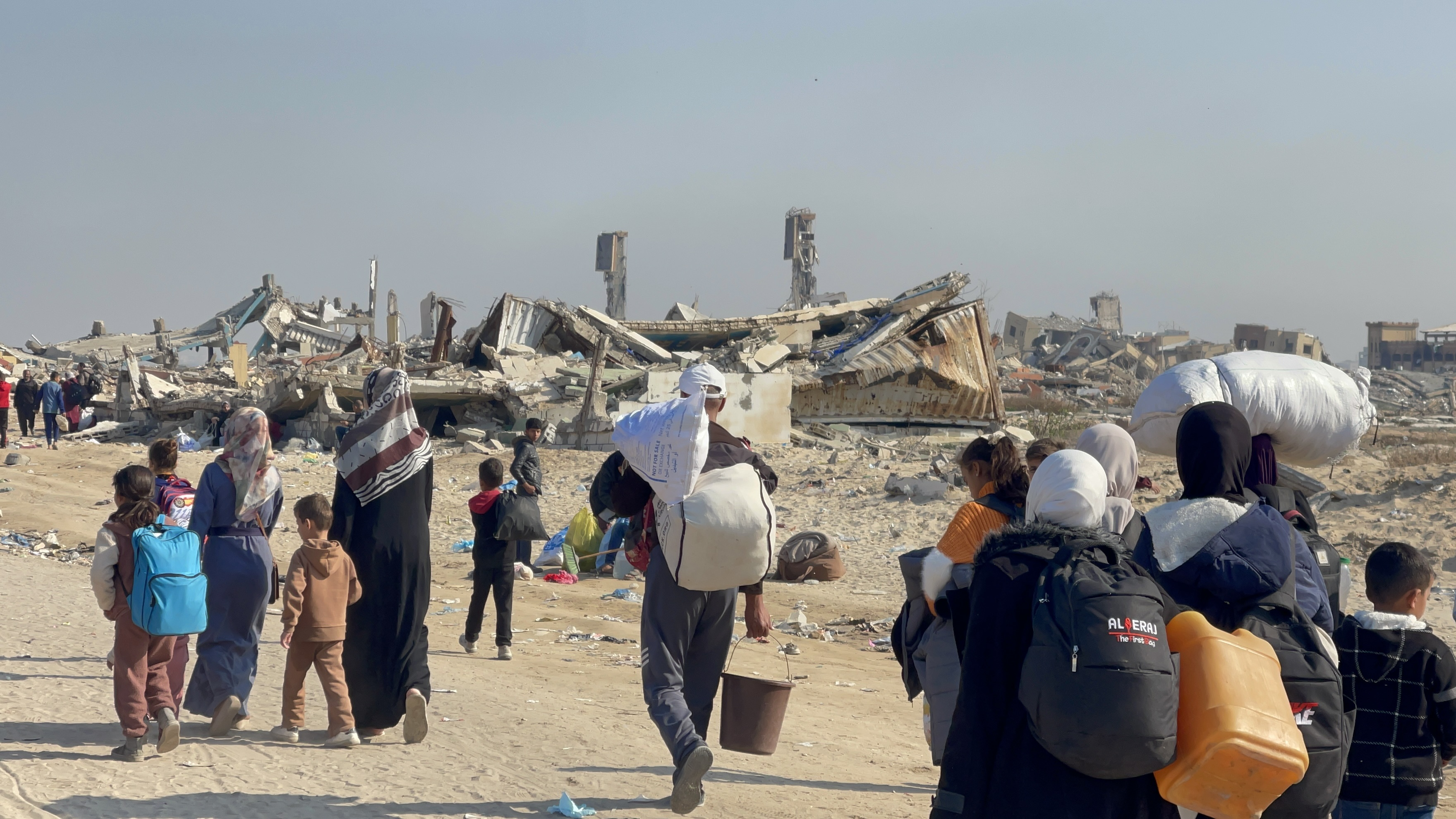
  Palestinian civilians in Gaza on 29 January 2025
- On 28 January, two Palestinian civilians, including a five-year-old child, were killed by Israeli attacks while trying to return to Northern Gaza.
- On 2 February, an Israeli airstrike targeted the Nuseirat refugee camp, killing one child and injuring several others.
- On 5 February, a 13-year-old child was shot dead by Israeli forces in Rafah, according to the Nasser Medical Complex in Khan Younis.
- On 9 February, IDF troops fired warning shots toward dozens of Palestinians approaching the border east of Gaza City near kibbutz Nahal Oz, and thus inside the buffer zone specified by the ceasefire. After failing to comply, three civilians were shot and killed. Commenting on the event, Israeli Defense Minister Israel Katz reiterated that there was "zero tolerance" for those violating the ceasefire's buffer zone, while a Hamas civil-defense spokesman reminded Gazans to follow official directives regarding the border. In a separate incident, Israeli soldiers killed an elderly woman in al-Qarara, east of Khan Younis.
- On 10 February, one Palestinian was killed by the IDF; the victim was transported to the European Gaza Hospital by truck drivers working at the Karm Abu Salem crossing. In a separate incident, one Palestinian was shot dead by Israeli forces when they opened fire on people near Shuja'iyya. In another separate incident, two Palestinians were injured by Israeli snipers in the Al-Awda area of Rafah.
- On 12 February, one Palestinian was killed and another seriously injured after an Israeli drone fired a rocket on a group of people who were inspecting their homes in the Abu Halawa area in Rafah.
- On 13 February, a Palestinian was shot and killed in Deir al-Balah.
- On 14 February, the Israeli navy shot and injured two Palestinian fishermen near Gaza City's port.
- On 15 February, two Palestinians were injured when an Israeli drone attacked a bulldozer while attempting to remove building debris in Central Gaza.
- On 16 February, Israeli forces carried out an airstrike in Rafah, killing three policemen. The Gaza Interior Ministry stated that the policemen were members of a civilian apparatus and had been in the area to oversee distribution of humanitarian aid. On that same day, one Palestinian ended up succumbing to his injuries after sustained in an Israeli bombardment in Rafah.
- On 19 February, a 16-year-old child was killed by an Israeli sharpshooter while five others were injured in Rafah.
- On 20 February, a 23-year-old Palestinian man was killed by Israeli forces in Shuja'iyya while trying to check his house.
- On 21 February, a Palestinian woman was killed by Israeli gunfire in east Rafah.
- On 23 February, a Palestinian man was killed by an Israeli sniper in east of Gaza City.
- On 27 February, a child was seriously injured by an Israeli drone in Rafah.
- On 28 February, an 18-year-old male was killed by an Israeli drone strike in Rafah.
- On 2 March, two Palestinians were killed in Beit Hanoun by an Israeli drone strike. On the same day, a woman was killed and two others were injured by Israeli bombardment in Khan Younis while a young man was killed by gunfire in Rafah.
- On 4 March, a Palestinian civilian was killed by Israeli forces in Deir al-Balah.
- On 6 March, three Palestinians were killed after the Israeli army targeted them in a group of people in Shuja'iyya. One of them was killed instantly, while the other two victims succumbed to their injuries.
- On 8 March, two Palestinians were killed by an Israeli drone strike in Rafah.
- On 10 March, at least two Palestinians were killed in an Israeli airstrike in the Bureij refugee camp.
- On 11 March, five Palestinians were killed by an Israeli airstrike near the Netzarim Corridor and a woman was killed by Israeli forces in Rafah.
- On 14 March, Israel carried out an airstrike in the Zeitoun district of Gaza city, killing four Palestinian civilians. On the same day, a fisherman was killed by an Israeli gunboat while fishing in Northern Gaza.
- On 15 March, the Gaza health ministry said that at least nine Palestinians, including Hossam Shabat and two other journalists, were killed by an Israeli airstrike in Beit Lahia; the head of Gazan civil defense said that they were using a drone to help build tents. Israel said six of those killed were Hamas and Palestinian Islamic Jihad affiliated and operating "under the guise of journalists". Later on that same day, three more Palestinians, including a child, were killed by Israeli gunfire and drone strikes.

=== Hindrance of aid ===
After the ceasefire went into effect on 20 January 2025, Israel has loosened restrictions on the entry of food, water, tents and other humanitarian supplies into the Gaza Strip. However, the Gaza Government Media Office says Israel has restricted the flow of tents, trailers and other temporary shelters, as well as heavy equipment to remove the rubble – all of which were promised in the ceasefire agreement. The director of the World Food Programme also said that some Israeli restrictions had remained. In contrast, U.S. Secretary of State Marco Rubio dismissed the allegation that Israel is preventing aid from entering Gaza and pointed out that Hamas uses networks to smuggle weapons and rebuild its military strength.

Israel also restricted the number of Palestinians who could leave Gaza to seek medical treatment abroad. While the agreement stipulated 150 Palestinian patients be allowed to leave per day, on 10 February, Israel only allowed 53 to leave. Among the patients prohibited from travelling was a child with cancer.

=== Delay of release of Palestinians ===
On 22 February 2025, following Hamas' release of six Israelis earlier that day, Israel cancelled the release of 620 Palestinian prisoners stipulated in the deal. In a statement, Israel indicated that it had instituted an indefinite delay of the release; Israel would only release the Palestinian prisoners upon confirmation that future hostage releases will occur without release ceremonies, which Israel called 'degrading'. The White House backed Israel's decision to delay the release of the Palestinian prisoners.

=== Refusal to withdraw from Philadelphi corridor ===
On 27 February 2025, after Israel had received the agreed upon number of hostages for phase one, an Israeli official told media outlets it would not withdraw from the Philadelphi corridor, despite agreeing to begin withdrawal from the corridor when the deal was first signed. The deal Israel ratified had instructed Israel to start withdrawing from the Philadelphi corridor on 1 March 2025 and fully withdraw within eight days.

== Violations and deviations by Palestinian militant groups ==
=== During release process ===
On 25 January, IDF Spokesman Daniel Hagari said that Hamas violated the hostage exchange agreement by releasing female soldiers before returning all civilian women. The prime minister issued a statement that as a result of the violation, Israel will not allow Gazans re-entrance to northern Gaza until the release of the final civilian woman, Arbel Yehud, who was supposed to be released on 25 January. Hamas responded that this was a technical issue. On the night between 26 and 27 January, Hamas and PIJ announced that on 30 January, it would release three hostages, including Arbel Yehud, Agam Berger, and one other adult hostage. In response, the IDF allowed Gazans to cross the Netzarim area and return to the northern Gaza Strip.

On 23 February, Israel said that Hamas had violated the ceasefire by conducting humiliating ceremonies upon hostages' release and using hostages for propaganda purposes.

==== Incorrect individual release ====
On 20 February, Hamas pledged to return the body of Shiri Bibas. However, upon receiving the body, Israeli forensic examination determined that it did not belong to Shiri Bibas and did not match any other Israeli female hostage held by Hamas. In response, Israel stated: "This is a very serious violation by the Hamas terrorist organization, which is required by the agreement to return four dead hostages. We demand that Hamas return Shiri home, along with all of our hostages". Hamas released the correct body the following day, arguing the delay was due to a mixup of bodies under the rubble of an Israeli airstrike.

=== Publishing names ===
Hamas did not provide Israel with the names of the hostages to be released in the first round to kick off the ceasefire agreement by the time spelled out in the agreement. In response, Israel delayed implementing the agreement by 2 hours and 45 minutes.

On 25 January, Israel said Hamas violated the terms of the ceasefire agreement by failing to publish the list detailing the status of the hostages set to be released throughout the remainder of the first phase. During the night between 26 and 27 January, Hamas transmitted the list to Israel.

=== Response to Israel violations ===
On 10 February, Hamas announced that they would be suspending the release of Israeli hostages, in what Hamas described as a response to Israel's violations of the agreement. In response, Israeli Defense Minister Israel Katz stated that Hamas's announcement constitutes a "complete violation" of the agreement.

Following Hamas's announcement, U.S. President Donald Trump addressed it, stating: "As far as I'm concerned, if all of the hostages aren't returned by Saturday [15 February] at 12 o'clock – I think it's an appropriate time – I would say, cancel it and all bets are off and let hell break out". Following Trump's remarks, Secretary of State Marco Rubio asserted that Hamas bears responsibility if the deal falls apart if it does not release the hostages by 15 February.

On 11 February, Israeli Prime Minister Benjamin Netanyahu stated: "In light of Hamas's announcement regarding its decision to violate the agreement and not release our hostages" the intense fighting in Gaza will resume if the promised hostages are not returned by noon on Saturday 15 February.

On 13 February, Hamas reversed themselves, announcing that they will free hostages as planned after receiving confirmation from Egyptian and Qatari mediators for the removal of obstacles in the implementation of the humanitarian provisions of the ceasefire deal. The hostage release went ahead two days later.

=== Rockets ===
Also on 13 February, a 14-year-old child was killed in the Gaza Strip from a projectile. Palestinian media stated the explosion was accidentally caused by explosives disposal engineers trying to dismantle an unexploded Israeli rocket. Meanwhile, Israel said it was a "terrorist rocket" launched from inside the Gaza Strip. The IDF said it carried out an airstrike at a "launch site" in Bureij area; no injuries were reported from the airstrike.

On 24 February, a rocket was fired from the Gaza Strip toward Israel and fell within the strip's territory. In response, the IDF targeted the rocket launcher, which was located in the southern Gaza Strip.

== Responses ==
=== Initial proposal ===
In Israel, the families of Israeli captives held by Hamas called on the US to pressure Netanyahu to reach a hostage release deal with Hamas. Protests broke out in Tel Aviv and Jerusalem. Protestors blocked the Ayalon Highway in Tel Aviv, demanding the government reach a deal to secure the release of Israeli captives. Minister of national security Itamar Ben-Gvir and minister of finance Bezalel Smotrich threatened to resign if Israel agreed to the war cabinet's proposal prior to the destruction of Hamas. Opposition leader Yair Lapid offered to support the government if the proposal was signed. Thousands gathered in Tel Aviv the following day to express support of the deal and criticism towards Netanyahu. Shas, an ultra-orthodox Jewish party and Netanyahu's biggest coalition partner, said it would give its full support to the deal.

After Hamas announced its acceptance of the Egypt-Qatar counterproposal in May 2024, crowds gathered to celebrate in Rafah, Gaza Strip. On the Palestinian side the proposal was supported by Palestinian president Mahmoud Abbas. Ordinary Gazans expressed support for the proposal. According to Reuters, senior Hamas officials expressed skepticism that Israel was serious about reaching a deal.

The proposal was co-signed by pro-Israel representatives Brad Schneider and Steny Hoyer and Israeli-critical senator Peter Welch and representative Greg Casar. Senate majority leader Chuck Schumer supported the deal. The proposal was opposed by senator Lindsey Graham, arguing that defeating Hamas was non-negotiable. Representative Michael Waltz argued that Hamas would be strengthened by continued discussions with Israel. Representative Marjorie Taylor Greene referred to the plan as "Hamas First". After the assassination of Hamas leader Ismail Haniyeh, President Biden said that the assassination "doesn't help" the Gaza ceasefire talks.

Turkish president Recep Tayyip Erdoğan welcomed Hamas's acceptance of the Egyptian–Qatari proposal and hoped Israel will do the same. French president Emmanuel Macron urged Netanyahu to reach a ceasefire and hostage deal with Hamas. UAE's Foreign Minister Abdullah bin Zayed Al Nahyan supported Egyptian-Qatari mediations and hoped the proposal would result in ending both the war and the suffering of Palestinians. The Israeli proposal was endorsed by French president Emmanuel Macron, Canadian prime minister Justin Trudeau, European Commission president Ursula von der Leyen, and diplomats from the United Kingdom and Germany.

On 31 July 2024, Egypt's Foreign Ministry said that the assassination of Hamas leader Ismail Haniyeh indicates that Israel has no political will for a ceasefire. Qatari prime minister Mohammed bin Abdulrahman Al Thani asked "how can mediation succeed when one party assassinates the negotiator on the other side?"

=== Final proposal ===
==== Israel ====
Following a meeting between Israeli Prime Minister Netanyahu, Defense Minister Israel Katz, and Finance Minister Bezalel Smotrich, Smotrich published a video stating that his main goal was "the fulfilment of all the goals of the war". Smotrich later stated that the deal was "bad and dangerous" for the national security of the State of Israel. Netanyahu said he sees a new ceasefire as temporary. President Isaac Herzog gave a televised statement announcing the ceasefire, describing it as a "necessary move" for the return of Israeli hostages.

Hundreds of Israeli protesters gathered outside the Israel Defense Forces headquarters in Tel Aviv to demand that the ceasefire deal be executed completely.

==== Palestine ====
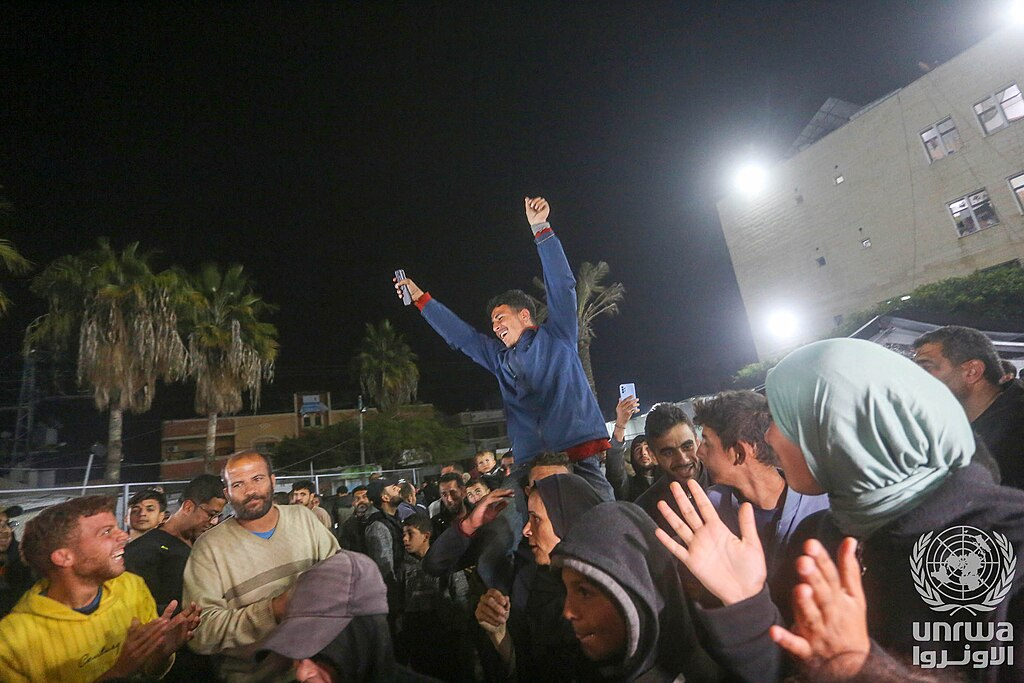
Joyful reactions of Palestinians in Deir al-Balah after news on ceasefire, Gaza Strip, 15 January 2025

A member of the Hamas political bureau Izzat al-Risheq, said that the ceasefire had met the group's conditions, further stating that the "occupier was brought to its knees,". Hamas official Khalil al-Hayya thanked the pro-Iran militias across the Middle East that launched attacks on Israel and opened "support fronts" to back Palestinians in Gaza, including the Houthis in Yemen and Lebanon's Hezbollah, He also shows gratitude to Qatar and Egypt for helping reach the ceasefire agreement as well as Turkey, South Africa and Malaysia for showing solidarity with Palestinians as well as protesters across the world that helped "break the silence" about atrocities in Gaza. al-Hayya later said that Israel had "failed" to achieve its publicly stated or "secret" goals in Gaza, including returning the captives by force, eliminating Hamas or displaсing the territory's population.

The Palestinian Islamic Jihad celebrated the ceasefire, saying that the "honourable" ceasefire deal was produced by the "legendary steadfastness" of Palestinians, the group further stated that it will remain active and vigilant to ensure the full implementation of the agreement.

The Popular Front for the Liberation of Palestine celebrated the ceasefire, stating that "Gaza defeats the genocide".

The secretary-general of the Palestinian National Initiative Mustafa Barghouti said that the ceasefire is a "moment of relief" but also warned the people in Gaza that they will likely face three days of intensified bombing before it goes into effect on 19 January.

After news of a ceasefire agreement, Palestinians in the Gaza Strip broke out into celebrations, including Gaza City, Khan Yunis, and the Al-Aqsa Martyrs Hospital and Deir el-Balah hospital in Deir al-Balah.

==== International ====
- Egypt: President Abdel Fattah el-Sisi welcomed the deal, stating that he stressed the importance of "accelerating the entry of urgent humanitarian aid to the people of Gaza, to confront the current catastrophic humanitarian situation, without any obstacles". Former assistant foreign minister Hussein Haridy stated that the agreement would open up the Rafah crossing on Gaza Strip's southern border.
- Qatar: Prime Minister Sheikh Mohammed bin Abdulrahman Al Thani described the ceasefire as a "start" of what should be an effort by the international community to maintain lasting peace. He emphasized the role that involved parties played in advancing negotiations, including White House National Security Council coordinator for the Middle East and North Africa Brett McGurk and the United States president-elect's Middle East envoy Steve Witkoff. Foreign Ministry spokesperson Majed al-Ansari said that both parties agreed that the ceasefire will take hold in 19 January, he further said that any disagreements were ironed out during the talks, saying "We are hopeful that the deal will hold".
- Saudi Arabia: The Foreign Ministry says it values the role that Qatar, Egypt and the US played in reaching the agreement, also saying that it should address the root causes of the conflict and establish a Palestinian state within the 1967 borders with East Jerusalem as its capital.
- United Kingdom: Prime Minister Keir Starmer expressed his support for the deal, emphasizing that it would end the conflict which was "triggered by the brutal terrorists of Hamas, who committed the deadliest massacre of Jewish people since the Holocaust". He added that "The hostages, who were brutally ripped from their homes on that day and held captive in unimaginable conditions ever since, can now finally return to their families". Furthermore, he underscored the importance of remembering "those who won't make it home – including the British people who were murdered by Hamas. We will continue to mourn and remember them". In addition, he expressed hope that the ceasefire would help innocent Palestinians in Gaza and "allow for a huge surge in humanitarian aid, which is so desperately needed to end the suffering in Gaza".
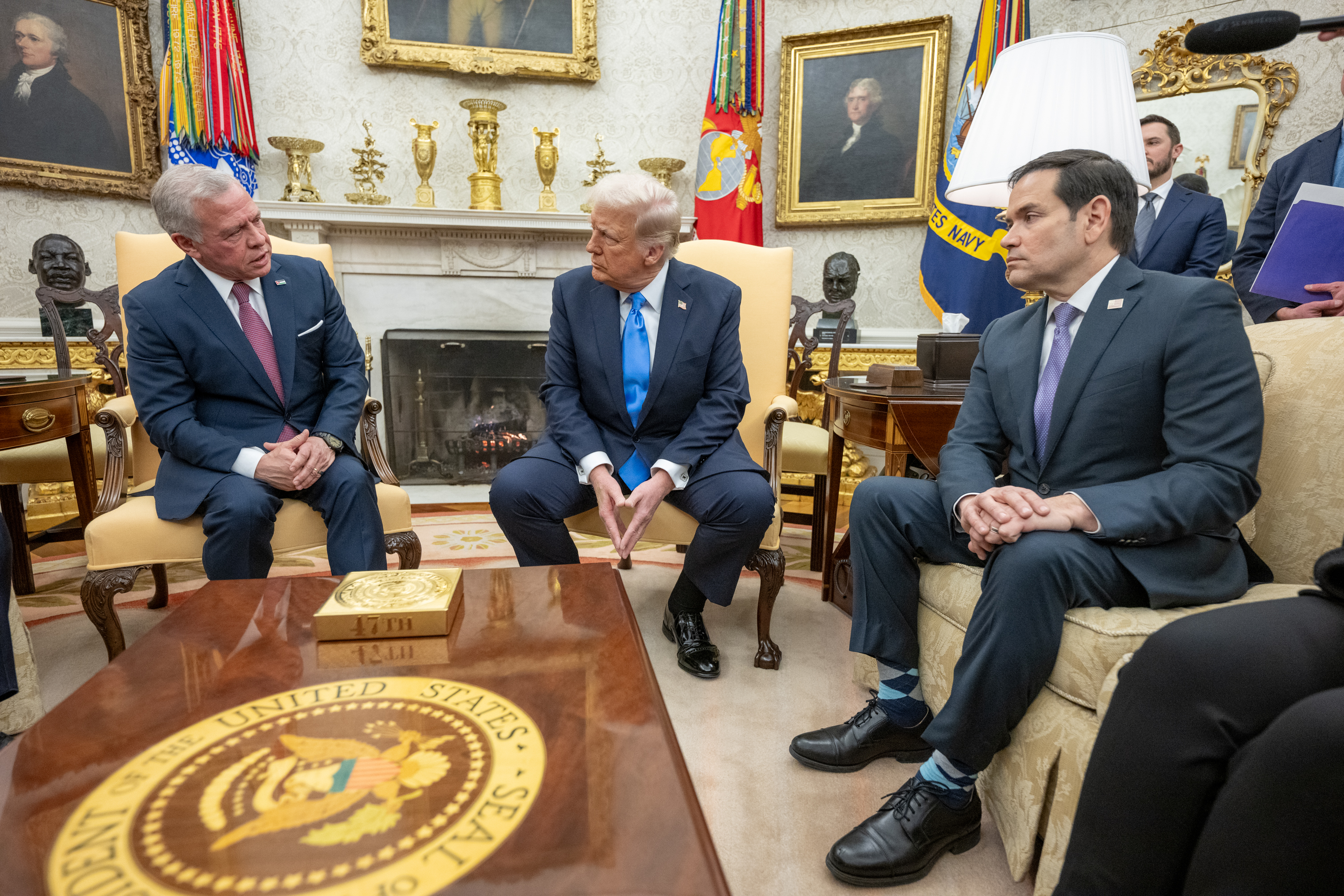
  President Donald Trump with King Abdullah II of Jordan and Foreign Secretary Marco Rubio at the White House, 11 February 2025
- United States: President-elect Donald Trump publicly acknowledged the deal's achievement of a hostage exchange on his Truth Social platform. During a U.S. Senate confirmation hearing for Marco Rubio as United States Secretary of State, Senator Jim Risch announced that the ceasefire had been agreed to by both parties. Senator Bernie Sanders welcomed the ceasefire, further saying that the war crimes of both sides should face accountability. Vice president Kamala Harris credited the leadership of president Joe Biden for the ceasefire, also thanking the leaders of Egypt and Qatar. She further stated that "We will never forget the lives taken as a result of the brutal Hamas terrorist attack on October 7, and the horrors endured by countless innocent people in the war that followed". Biden said that his team and Trump's team "worked as one" to make the deal.
- Yemen: Houthi spokesperson Mohammed Abdul Salam stated that the Palestinian cause remains a primary issue, further stating on X that "The Israeli invasion of Gaza left our people no choice but to support, taking responsibility towards an oppressed people.
- Argentina: President Javier Milei posted on his X account that he hopes Donald Trump and Benjamin Netanyahu are successful "in the process of liberating the 98 people abducted by the terrorist group Hamas, among whom are nine Argentines". And, he added that "from Argentina, we will do everything we can to heal our countrymen and put an end to this scourge," referring to the hostages with dual Argentine-Israeli citizenship.

==== Organizations ====
- The Committee to Protect Journalists requested that Israeli, Palestinian, and Egyptian authorities grant access to international journalists in order to "independently investigate the deliberate targeting of journalists that has been widely documented".
- Chief of the World Health Organization Tedros Adhanom Ghebreyesus welcomed a ceasefire, saying "peace is the best medicine" as health needs in Gaza remain "enormous".
- Chief of the World Food Programme Cindy McCain called for resources, access and protection to allow its teams to scale up aid to the Gaza strip, welcoming the ceasefire.
- The secretary general of Amnesty International, Agnès Callamard says that while the ceasefire deal may provide a "glimmer of hope" for Palestinians, it is "terribly overdue", she also called out the international community's failure to pressure Israel to live up to its legal obligations and allow humanitarian aid to reach Gaza.
- Council on American–Islamic Relations director Nihad Awad released a statement welcoming the "long overdue" ceasefire and criticizing U.S. President Biden for not putting enough pressure on Netanyahu and for "needlessly funding so much death and destruction." He also praised president-elect Trump for pressing for a ceasefire and urged him to seek "a just, lasting peace" in the region.
- President of the International Committee of the Red Cross Mirjana Spoljaric Egger said it is ready to help implement the ceasefire agreement and facilitate the release of captives and prisoners, also stating that they are prepared to massively scale up their humanitarian response in Gaza.
- UN Secretary-General António Guterres welcomed the ceasefire, stating that the "priority now must be to ease the tremendous suffering caused by this conflict".
- International Rescue Committee head David Miliband said that the organization is ready to expand its operations after the ceasefire.
- Save the Children CEO Inger Ashing said that if the agreement was fully implemented, the pause will "bring them vital reprieve from the bombs and bullets that have stalked them for more than a year. But it is not enough and the race is on to save children facing hunger and disease as the shadow of famine looms."

== Analysis ==
=== Preliminary ===
Marwan Bishara, the senior political analyst at Al Jazeera English, stated the proposed ceasefire contained a strategy of "ambiguity" but that,

The Israeli prime minister himself says Israel won't stop the war until it destroys Hamas... So while everyone in Washington is trying to spin it as if there is confliction and controversy, there really isn't. It's quite simple: Netanyahu does not want to end the war.

Writing in Le Monde diplomatique, Adam Shatz said that Israel had taken advantage of the United States' facilitation of a peace process to assassinate Ismail Haniyeh and Hassan Nasrallah, writing that,

Netanyahu helped the Americans to draft a ceasefire proposal he had no intention of honouring, while conspiring to kill the Arab leaders with whom the ceasefire was to be reached.

=== After signing ===
The Institute for the Study of War stated on 16 January that Hamas would likely reorganize and relocate its cells around the Gaza Strip but that the ceasefire period is too short for reorganizing the cells back into a proper military hierarchy. The large-scale replacement of personnel, equipment, and supplies is expected to take months without Israeli interference.

Following the implementation of the ceasefire on 19 January, multiple news outlets, including Israeli media, stated that Israel had ultimately failed to destroy Hamas, which retains control over the Gaza Strip. The government of Israel, however, continued to insist that the Gaza Strip be de-militarized, as part of its implementation of the "second phase" (see supra) of the peace deal.

== End of the ceasefire ==
On the early morning of 18 March 2025, during Ramadan, Israel conducted a surprise offensive of "extensive" airstrikes on Gaza, thereby shattering the almost two-month truce. Israeli forces acknowledged that they were "conducting extensive strikes", and separately stated that their attack "plan was kept in closed circles in the IDF to create an element of surprise and deception." The airstrikes killed more than 400 Palestinians, according to Gaza's ministry of health.

Later on 18 March, Israel Katz, the Israeli Minister of Defense, commented: "Tonight we returned to fighting in Gaza". Israeli Prime Minister Benjamin Netanyahu declared on the evening of 18 March that Israel has "resumed combat in full force" against Hamas in Gaza, and that the 18 March strikes were "just the beginning". Netanyahu's office stated that the strikes were carried out in response to Hamas's refusal to release hostages and its rejection of proposals to extend the cease-fire. A US National Security Council spokesman blamed Hamas for the collapse of the ceasefire, arguing that they "could have released hostages to extend the ceasefire but instead chose refusal and war."

Israeli journalist Barak Ravid argued that while journalists described the resumption of airstrikes as being a result of a "collapse", the ceasefire was deliberately collapsed by the Israeli government itself.

== See also ==
- 2023 Gaza war ceasefire
- Gaza war hostage crisis
- Donald Trump's September 2025 Gaza Strip proposal
