= David Trigger =

Australian anthropologist, author, and academic

David Samuel Trigger
- Born: Brisbane, Australia
- Occupations: Anthropologist, author and academic

Academic background
- Education: B.A. Anthropology; Ph.D. Anthropology
- Alma mater: The University of Queensland
- Thesis: Doomadgee: A study of power relations and social action in a north Australian Aboriginal settlement (1985)

Academic work
- Institutions: The University of Queensland; The University of Western Australia

David Samuel Trigger is an Australian anthropologist, author, and academic. He is a professor emeritus of anthropology at the University of Queensland (UQ) as well as adjunct professor at the University of Western Australia (UWA). He is a Member and previous co-chair of the Professor Ronald Berndt and Dr. Catherine Berndt Research Foundation at UWA and has served as the co-director of the Centre for Native Title Anthropology at the Australian National University. He is the Principal Partner in David S. Trigger & Associates consulting anthropologists.

Trigger is most known for his research in applied anthropological studies, specifically focusing on Indigenous land negotiations in Australian society, contributing directly asa researcher in native title claims, heritage matters, and agreements between Aboriginal groups and other land users. He has authored reports for legal cases and published academic journal articles and book chapters. He is the author of Whitefella Comin: Aboriginal Responses to Colonialism in Northern Australia. He co-edited Disputed Territories: Land, Culture, and Identity in Settler Societies. He has won awards including a Canadian Studies Faculty Enrichment Award, Canadian Studies Faculty Research Award, and (with co-authors) The Mander Jones Award issued by the Australian Society of Archivists.

Trigger is a Fellow of the Australian Anthropological Society and a Member of the Australian Institute of Aboriginal & Torres Strait Islander Studies.

== Early life and education ==
Trigger earned a Bachelor of Arts in anthropology from UQ, served as an Assistant Lecturer in Anthropology at Darwin Community College in 1976–1977, and worked as a Site Recorder mapping Indigenous cultural landscapes at UQ from 1978 to 1983. He completed his Ph.D. thesis in 1984, titled Doomadgee: A Study of Power Relations and Social Action in a North Australian Aboriginal Settlement, and was awarded the degree in 1986. His research with Indigenous communities in Australia's northern Gulf Country became an anchor for his subsequent career as an anthropologist.

== Career ==
Trigger joined The University of Western Australia (UWA) in 1986 and served as Lecturer, Senior Lecturer, and associate professor in Anthropology & Sociology until 1999, then held the position of professor from 2000 until 2007. Moving to The University of Queensland (UQ), he was appointed as a professor at the School of Social Science and assumed the role of Head of School from 2011 to 2013. Since 2019, he has been professor emeritus at UQ and an Adjunct Professor at UWA.

== Research ==
Trigger has explored questions of belonging in post-colonial societies through his work in remote Australian communities and relationships among people with diverse cultural identities. He has studied the overlaps and divergences of identity and belonging among those with Aboriginal, Euro-Australian, and Asian ancestries, drawing from concepts of 'nativeness' and 'invasiveness' to understand their implications for cultural identities and land management. He has also contributed to the anthropological study of Indigenous land tenure through his research on resource development negotiations and formal engagements as an expert witness in native title claim work across Australia.

In the field of Australian Aboriginal Studies, Trigger has researched Indigenous systems of land tenure, encompassing practical investigations into negotiating cultural heritage and traditional rights in land and waters. His PhD work delved into everyday aspects of social interaction, considering the legacies of colonialism and diverse ancestries to depict the history of inter-racial and intercultural relations in Doomadgee settlement. He then authored Whitefella Comin: Aboriginal Responses to Colonialism in Northern Australia, in 1992, and examined Black-White relations in the Gulf Country, particularly life at Doomadgee under Brethren missionaries from 1930 to 1983. Campbell Macknight reviewed this work and highlighted the book for significantly contributing to the complexities of colonialism, shedding light on the broader inequality between Aboriginal people and other Australians.

Trigger has advocated for recognition of anthropologists' involvement in Aboriginal land rights, emphasizing the challenges and rewards of applied anthropology, and highlighting the importance of tangible outcomes for people, including legal rights and an improved bargaining position. With Martin Forsey and Carla Meurk, he emphasized the methodological importance of memorable events in ethnographic studies, highlighting the value of revelatory moments during fieldwork.

In his co-edited volume, Disputed Territories: Land, Culture, and Identity in Settler Societies, Trigger studied the role of land in shaping cultural identities in settler societies, focusing on Australasia and southern Africa where European perspectives have intersected with indigenous cultures and Southern Hemisphere environments. Sue Kossew called it "a valuable addition to and development of the important issue of the 'disputed territories' of settler societies and of the ongoing and reciprocal nature of colonial and post-colonial exchanges."

=== Land rights negotiations ===
Trigger researched negotiations over land rights in the Gulf Country and other regions since the introduction of native title, addressing complexities such as changing oral traditions, cultural landscapes, and diverse approaches to the politics of indigenism. He has shared his perspective on how native title has enhanced the bargaining position of Indigenous groups, creating a new avenue for post-colonial politics.

In the Gulf of Carpentaria region, Trigger focused his research on issues including mining impacts, politics of belonging, race relations, cultural change, and native title, challenging the perception that applied research is ethically inappropriate. He also explored the relationship between mining projects and Indigenous cultural landscapes, acknowledging conflicts, especially when mines disrupted spiritual significance. Diving into the impact of mining in remote Aboriginal regions of Australia, he scrutinized responses to the Century Mine in the Gulf country, illustrating the challenges mining posed to Aboriginal communities.

=== Nativeness and belonging ===
Trigger has conducted fieldwork in the Gulf country and across Australia and made contributions to the literature on assumptions about nativeness and the politics of belonging in a post-colonial context. Exploring how Aboriginal people and other Australians express their sense of connection and belonging, he emphasized spiritual significance for Aboriginal people of the Gulf Country whereas Whitefellas place greater emphasis on the practical value of the land and the importance of the life stories of both deceased and living relatives. He also noted the insufficiency of a basic concept of 'non-Indigenous' solidarity in relation to social identities linked to diverse ethnic histories of migration to Australia and subsequent connections to places and environmental surroundings. Throughout his career he has continued his personal and intellectual interest in Jewish identity including relations between a global diaspora and the State of Israel.

With co-authors Jane Mulcock and Richard Martin, Trigger has criticized simplistic ideas of any total lack of 'non-Indigenous' belonging and senses of place. His studies have encompassed environmentalism, pro-development ideology, and notions of which flora and fauna come to be regarded as native or indigenous. In the context of ecological restoration, he investigated cultural assumptions about nativeness and belonging, employing case materials to reveal the negotiated and ambiguous nature of ideas regarding what culturally and ecologically belongs in the nation. Additionally, he offered a politically productive perspective on belonging to emphasize the inevitability of coexistence among diverse social identities in the context of legacies of settler colonialism and migration to the Australian continent.

== Awards and honors ==
- 1989 – Canadian Studies Faculty Enrichment Award, Central European Canadian Studies
- 1993 – Canadian Studies Faculty Research Award, Central European Canadian Studies
- 2020 – The Mander Jones Award, Australian Society of Archivists

== Bibliography ==
=== Books ===
- Whitefella Comin: Aboriginal Responses to Colonialism in Northern Australia (1992) ISBN 978-0521131780
- Disputed Territories: Land, Culture, and Identity in Settler Societies (2003) ISBN 978-9622096929

=== Selected articles ===
- Trigger, David S. (10 February 2009). "Blackfellas and Whitefellas: the Concepts of Domain and Social Closure in the Analysis of Race-Relations". Mankind. 16 (2): 99–117. doi:10.1111/j.1835-9310.1986.tb00748.x.
- Trigger, David S. (April 1997). "Mining, Landscape and the Culture of Development Ideology in Australia". Ecumene. 4 (2): 161–180. doi:10.1177/147447409700400203.
- Head, Lesley; Trigger, David; Mulcock, Jane (2005). "Culture as Concept and Influence in Environmental Research and Management". Conservation and Society. 3 (2): 251–264. JSTOR 26396578.
- Trigger, David; Mulcock, Jane; Gaynor, Andrea; Toussaint, Yann (May 2008). "Ecological restoration, cultural preferences and the negotiation of 'nativeness' in Australia". Geoforum. 39 (3): 1273–1283. doi:10.1016/j.geoforum.2007.05.010.
- Trigger, David S. (September 2008). "Indigeneity, ferality, and what 'belongs' in the Australian bush: Aboriginal responses to 'introduced' animals and plants in a settler-descendant society". Journal of the Royal Anthropological Institute. 14 (3): 628–646. doi:10.1111/j.1467-9655.2008.00521.x.
- Trigger, D (2008). "Place, belonging and nativeness in Australia". In Vanclay, Frank; Higgins, Matthew; Blackshaw, Adam (eds.). Making Sense of Place: Exploring concepts and expressions of place through different senses and lenses. Canberra: National Museum of Australia Press. pp. 301–309. ISBN 978-1-876944-51-3.
- Trigger, David (November 2011). "Anthropology Pure and Profane: The Politics of Applied Research in Aboriginal Australia". Anthropological Forum. 21 (3): 233–255. doi:10.1080/00664677.2011.617675.
- Trigger, David; Martin, Richard J. (December 2016). "Place, Indigeneity, and Identity in Australia's Gulf Country". American Anthropologist. 118 (4): 824–837. doi:10.1111/aman.12681.
- Trigger, David (April 2020). "Distinguished lecture: Native title—Implications for Australian senses of place and belonging". The Australian Journal of Anthropology. 31 (1): 9–30. doi:10.1111/taja.12341.
