= 2024 Radboud University Nijmegen pro-Palestinian campus occupations =

2024 Radboud University Nijmegen pro-Palestinian campus occupation
- Part of Gaza war protests (at universities (in 2024 (in the Netherlands)))
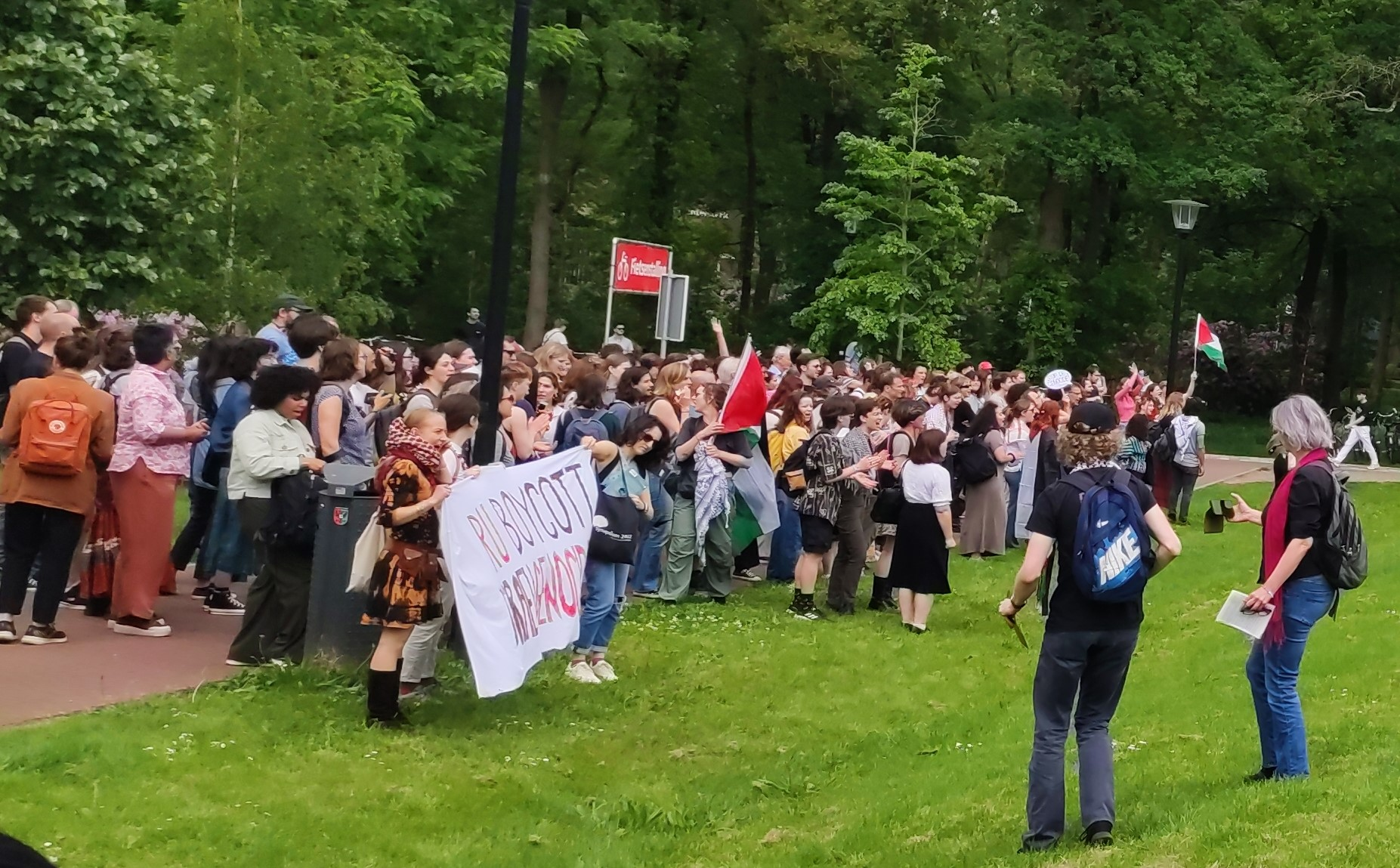
- Protesters at Radboud University Nijmegen
- Date: May 13, 2024 – June 5, 2024 (23 days)
- Location: Radboud University Nijmegen (Nijmegen)
- Goals: Disinvestment from Israel
- Methods: Protests; walkouts; occupations; protest marches; traffic obstruction

The pro-Palestinian campus occupations at Radboud University Nijmegen in the Netherlands were a series of occupation protests, as part of the broader Gaza war protests. On 13 May 2024 protesters created an encampment, similar to other campus protests in the Netherlands, the United States and other countries. On 20 May a second encampment was established next to the universities' administrative building. On 5 June after the occupation of another university building, police cleared the encampment. The protesters demanded that the university board divest from Israel over its alleged genocide of Palestinians and invasion of the Gaza Strip, and to support Palestinian students and universities. The protests included walkouts, daily marches, temporary occupations, as well as vandalism.

== Background ==
Pro-Palestinian student protests have been organized at Radboud University since as early as 18 October 2023, and have continued sporadically since then. In April 2024, demonstrators graffitied the wall of the university library with pro-Palestine slogans.

The encampment was set up following the eviction of similar occupation protests at the University of Amsterdam (UvA) and Utrecht University. At UvA, riot police used bulldozers to demolish the barricade set by the protesters, causing clashes between protesters and the police. In response, a national walkout took place at the University of Groningen, Eindhoven University of Technology, Wageningen University & Research, Maastricht University, and Radboud University Nijmegen.

== Timeline ==
=== 12–13 May: Encampment set up, first protests ===
On 12 May, a group of pro-Palestinian students and staff at Radboud University Nijmegen issued a statement condemning the action taken by the Executive Boards of the University of Amsterdam and Utrecht University, describing them as having "authorized extreme police violence against their staff and students who were engaged in non-violent protests against the complicity of Dutch universities in the ongoing genocide in Gaza". The group also called for a walkout by staff and students the following day.

In response, the university's executive board issued a statement in which they echoed calls for an end to the violence against civilians and permitting humanitarian aid into Gaza. They also stated that they generally "view international cooperative contacts between academic staff as an opportunity to maintain an open line of communication, even in times of conflict."

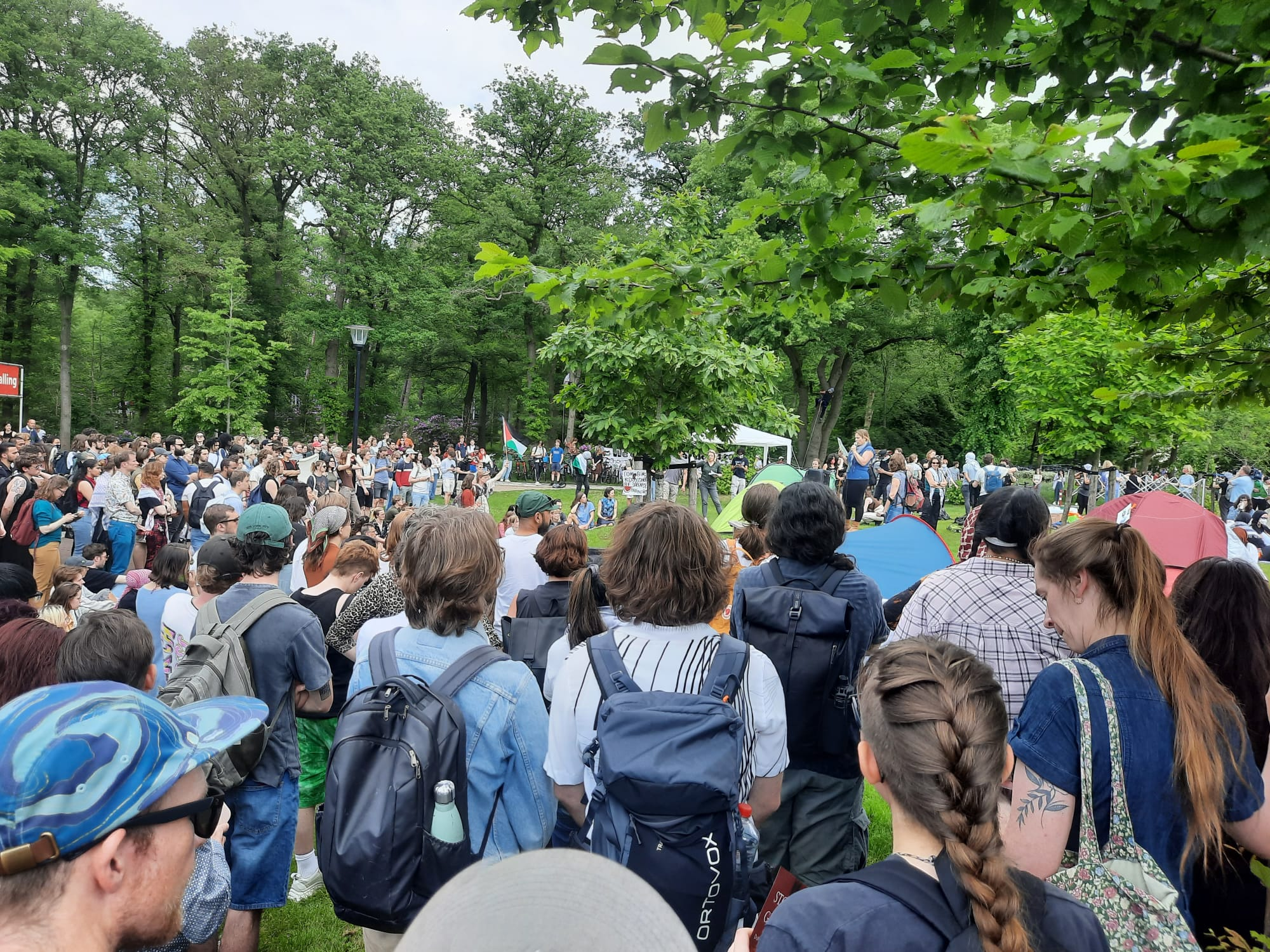
Protesters at Radboud University, 13 May 2024.

On 13 May, students and staff gathered in Erasmus Square on the university campus and chanted pro-Palestinian slogans, repeating their calls for the university board to divest and sever all ties with Israeli universities and companies. The students then established an encampment on part of the campus lawn. The protest was attended by Maya Wind, an Israeli researcher at University of British Columbia and author of Towers of Ivory and Steel: How Israeli Universities Deny Palestinian Freedom. She spoke to staff and answered questions.

A university representative requested that protesters, numbered at approximately 200 with around 20 tents, remove their encampment and leave by 6 pm. According to the university, the protest had been peaceful and "a good atmosphere", and no police report was filed.

=== 14–18 May: First marches, occupation ===
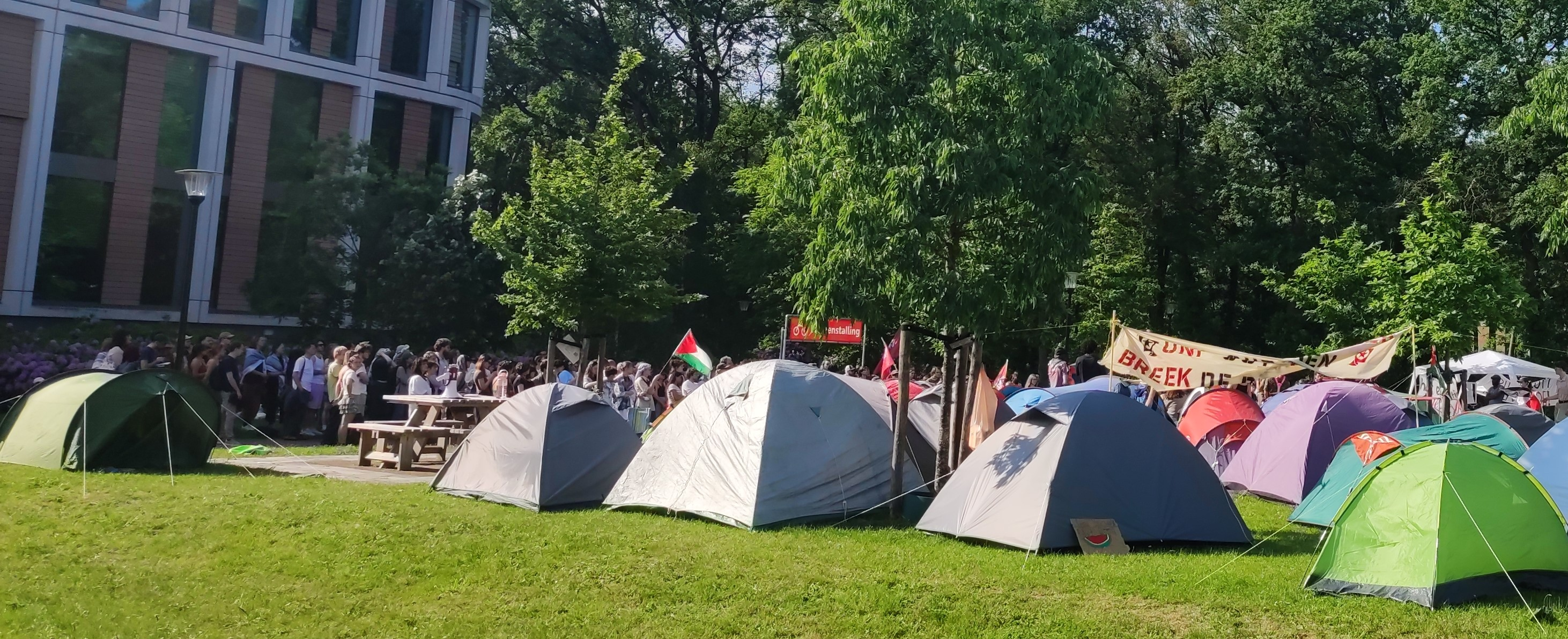
Encampment at Radboud University, 14 May 2024.

On 14 May, various speeches took place at the encampment, with protesters vowing to continue their occupation until their demands were heard. Later that day, organizers called for a march on 15 May towards the offices of the university's executive board.

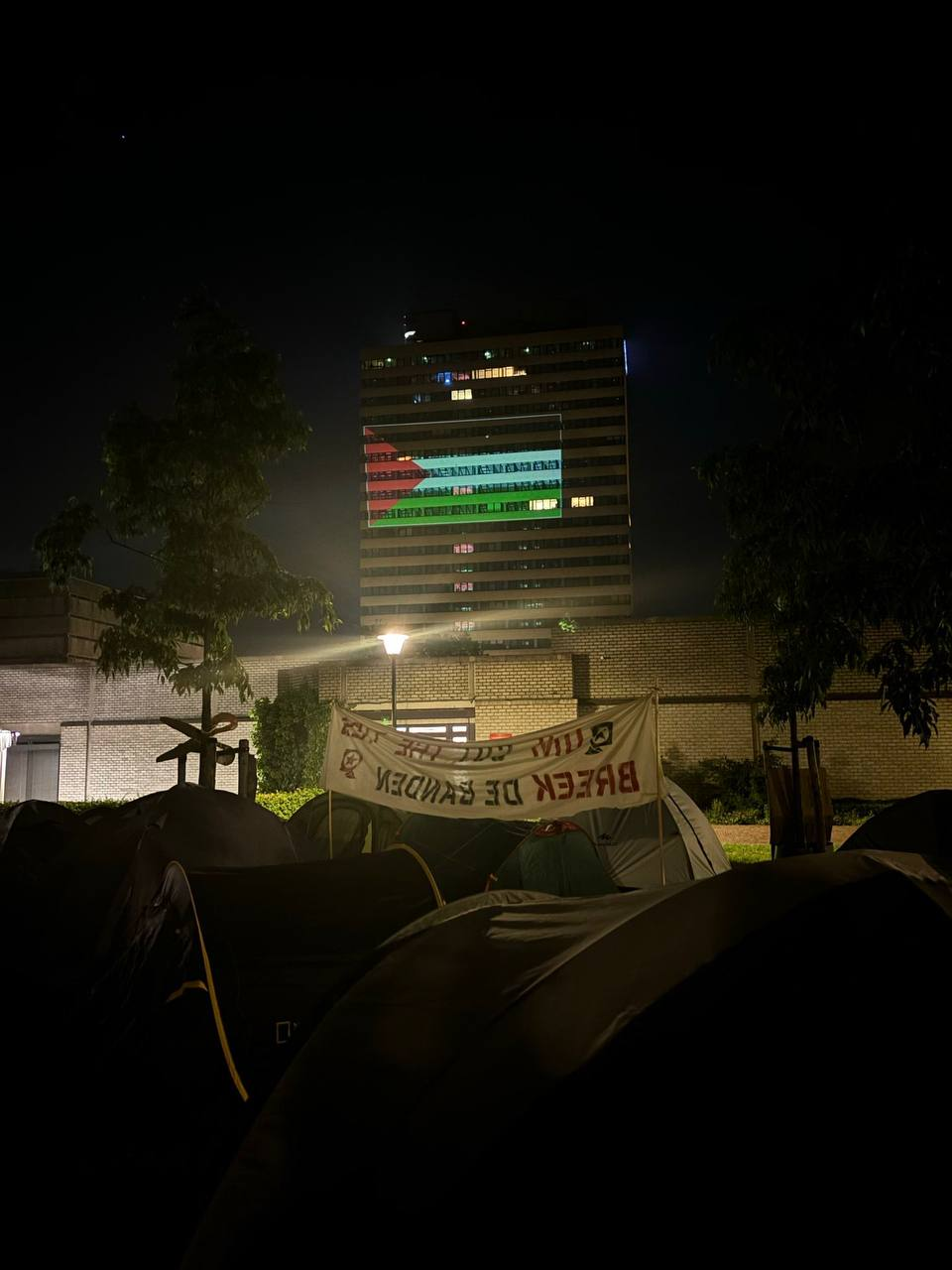
Pro-Palestinian protesters at Radboud University projected a Palestinian flag on the Erasmus building, 15 May 2024.

In the morning of 15 May, the encampment grew from 30 to approximately 45 tents. Protesters vowed to continue daily marches at the campus to intensify the protest, until the university accepted their demands. At the Berchmanianum building, the university welcomed a delegation of thirteen protesters to negotiate with the Executive Board of the university. By the evening, the number of tents had again grown to 60.

On 16 May, the fifth day of the campus occupation, activists temporarily occupied a lecture hall before climbing on top of the Cultuurcafé roof to wave Palestine flags. Protesters also obstructed journalists from documenting the protests. After the protesters left, the building was closed.

During the march of 17 May, a road was temporarily blocked.

=== 19–31 May: Second encampment, second occupation ===
The encampment was still standing by 20 May, which marked the eighth day and second week of the encampment. A second encampment was set up next to the administration building of Radboud University to increase the pressure on the executive board specifically.

On 21 May, protesters attempted to gain access to the university's academic library, which was unsuccessful. Marches were still being held, and a road was again temporarily blocked. On 22 May, a sit-in was held by a few dozen students. Police showed up, but did not intervene. The next day, the road was blocked again.

On 27 May, protesters occupied part of the Erasmus building. Two protesters had been arrested that day before the occupation, on the suspicion of vandalism. The protesters declared not to leave as long as the university refused to break ties with Israeli organisations. In the night between 27 and 28 May, police in riot gear moved in and cleared the building.

On 31 May, a few dozen students occupied the office of Daniël Wigboldus, president of the executive board of Radboud University Nijmegen. The students occupied the room for two hours, and left a book (Why People Radicalize by Kees van den Bos) and a handwritten letter expressing disappointment that the board did not show up to discuss the situation.

=== 1–5 June: Clearing of encampment ===
On 5 June, a group of protesters entered a university building and set up barricades, sprayed graffiti on the walls and windows and opened fire hoses, according to the university. The Thomas van Aquino building would remain closed for at least two days. The protest was ended by the police late at night on the orders of the mayor. Later, the police cleared the entire encampment at the university. There were no arrests.

== Responses ==
On 12 May the executive board of the Radboud University Nijmegen issued a statement stating that they are in dialogue with the students about the "content and form of the protest."

Dutch political parties GroenLinks, PvdA, Socialist Party and Party for the Animals announced their solidarity with the protests and encampment at Radboud University Nijmegen. They further called on the Municipality of Nijmegen and the University Board to allow this protest to take place.

On 22 May, Radboud University published a list and statement regarding its collaborations with Israeli organisations. However, new details and information were not made public. The university also filed complaints against activists for alleged destruction of property. The university also made it known to regret that the boundaries were "increasingly being crossed" at the campus protest.

On 23 May 344 Radboud University employees signed an open letter, expressing their support for the student protesters. This number had grown to over 400 by 27 May. Additionally, a number of employees explicitly supported the student activists on social media, including those occupying the university buildings.

== See also ==
- 2024 pro-Palestinian protests on university campuses
- 2024 pro-Palestinian protests on university campuses in the Netherlands
- 2024 University of Amsterdam pro-Palestinian campus occupation
- 2024 Utrecht University pro-Palestinian campus occupations
- 2025 Radboud University Nijmegen pro-Palestinian campus occupations
