= 2025 University of Amsterdam pro-Palestinian campus occupations =

- Part of Gaza war protests (at universities (in 2025 in the Netherlands))
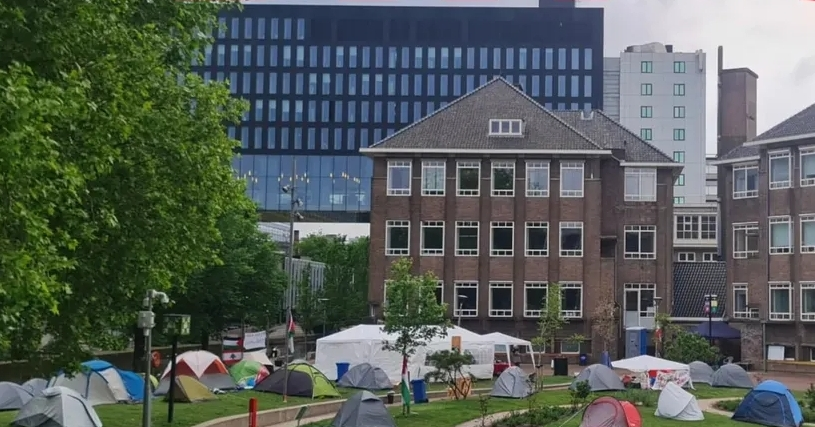
- Pro-Palestine and anti-genocide encampment on the campus of the University of Amsterdam in June 2025.
- Date: 14 April 2025 – 20 June 2025
- Location: University of Amsterdam (UvA), Amsterdam, Netherlands
- Caused by: Israeli military actions in Gaza; university ties with Israeli academic and research institutions
- Goals: Immediate severance of all institutional ties with Israeli universities and research partners; Academic boycott of Israel; Institutional transparency regarding collaborations
- Methods: Building occupation (Maagdenhuis); Barricades and protest banners; Demonstrations and rallies
- Status: Ongoing
- Result: Police intervention and removal of protesters; Significant property damage to Maagdenhuis; National debate on university ties to Israel and protest rights

The 2025 University of Amsterdam student protests are a series of ongoing demonstrations and encampments initiated by students and staff at University of Amsterdam in the Netherlands. Following several smaller protests earlier that year, on 7 May 2025 protesters established an encampment on university grounds to demand that the university sever all academic and financial ties with Israeli institutions and companies in response to the ongoing Gaza war and the genocide of Palestinians. The occupations are part of a broader wave of pro-Palestinian protests at Dutch and international universities calling for academic boycott and divestment from Israeli institutions.

== Background ==
Protests against the war in Gaza and Dutch university ties with Israeli institutions began as early as October 2023, but escalated in 2025 after increased awareness of war crimes committed by the Israeli army. Inspired by similar campus protests in the United States and Europe, demonstrators at UvA demanded an immediate end to all institutional collaborations with Israeli academic and research organizations, as well as full transparency about such ties.

== Protests and encampments ==
=== Maagdenhuis occupation ===
On the morning of 14 April, between 50 and 100 pro-Palestinian activists entered the Maagdenhuis, ordering staff to leave and barricading entrances. Protesters displayed Palestinian flags and banners from the windows, spray-painted slogans such as “Free Gaza” and “UvA cut ties now” on the walls, overturned or stacked chairs to block emergency exits, and set off green and red flares.

The group demanded that the university immediately sever all ties with Israeli universities, stating that suspending collaboration with the Hebrew University of Jerusalem was insufficient. The Executive Board of UvA refused to negotiate with the masked occupiers and filed a police report. Dozens of supporters outside the building clashed with police as they attempted to break through the barriers.

Police cleared the Maagdenhuis by the end of the day, removing all remaining demonstrators. The occupation resulted in significant property damage, including vandalism, graffiti, and looting of the canteen.

=== Roeterseiland campus occupation ===
On 2 June, demonstrators re-established a protest encampment on the Roeterseiland campus of the University of Amsterdam (UvA), calling for the university to sever all ties with Israeli institutions and companies alleged to be complicit in the ongoing genocide in Gaza. The protest, which follows similar actions earlier in May, quickly drew over 50 participants and continued to grow throughout the day.

Demonstrators renamed the campus "Alaa al-Najjar campus" in memory of Dr. Alaa al-Najjar, a pediatrician from Gaza who lost nine of her children in an Israeli airstrike on 23 May. The encampment featured tents, banners, and daily programming including teach-ins, workshops, and speeches by students and faculty.

The renewed protest came amid ongoing debates within the university. In late May, both the UvA Works Council and the Student Council publicly urged the university administration to suspend all collaborations with Israeli academic institutions, citing concerns about complicity in human rights violations. The encampment and protests lasted until 20 June, when the protesters disbanded on their own.

== Reactions ==
The UvA Executive Board, led by Chair Prof. Edith Hooge, condemned the occupation and the damage, emphasizing that while peaceful protest is allowed, intimidation and vandalism are unacceptable. The university did not engage substantively with the masked occupiers but reiterated its commitment to open dialogue and debate about the conflict in Gaza.

On 31 May, UvA rector Peter-Paul Verbeek, for the first time, publicly acknowledged the ongoing genocide in Gaza during a university meeting, stating, "We cannot ignore the reality of genocidal violence that is unfolding". However, as of early June, the university administration had not yet adopted the councils’ recommendations to fully suspend ties with Israeli institutions.

Earlier in the year, the University of Amsterdam announced it would indefinitely suspend student exchange programmes with the Hebrew University, following recommendations from a university-appointed committee on "sensitive partnerships". The decision was based on concerns over the university's ties to the Israeli military and its failure to distance itself from alleged human rights violations in Gaza. Israeli students already in Amsterdam may complete their studies, but new exchanges are halted. Since the protests the university claimed it would look into each collaboration and assess its future on a case-by-case basis, but so far no further ties have been cut.

Following the Roeterseiland campus occupation in June, talks between the protesters and UvA officials, including Rector Magnificus Peter-Paul Verbeek and deans Christa Boer and Marieke de Goede, commenced shortly thereafter. These discussions led to six preliminary agreements, including an accelerated internal ethics investigation into the university’s ties with Tel Aviv University and a commitment to consult the representative advisory bodies on the matter. The university also announced plans to seek joint action among Dutch universities in requesting the European Commission to review research cooperation with Israel under the Horizon Europe programme. Additionally, the UvA committed to sending an urgent letter to the Dutch government urging a stronger stance on Israel’s military actions in Gaza. By 4 June, negotiations had collapsed. Protesters declared that they saw “no room for further talks”, citing the administration’s refusal to consider cutting ties with Israeli institutions or even to freeze the formation of new ones. The UvA expressed regret at the breakdown of dialogue but reiterated that it would still implement the actions previously agreed upon. The university also stated it would not press charges against the protesters, provided the occupation remained peaceful.

Rector Verbeek stated that the university’s stance had evolved in comparison to earlier demonstrations, now publicly acknowledging that genocide was taking place in Gaza. However, he characterized the situation as a moral dilemma, underscoring the difficulty of balancing an open academic environment with the need to avoid complicity in human rights violations.

On 15 October, the Executive Board announced that it will not establish new ties with Israeli institutions. The Board also mentioned it would try to withdraw from current Horizon Europe programme collaborations.

== See also ==
- Student activism
- Academic boycotts of Israel
- Boycott, Divestment and Sanctions
- 2024 University of Amsterdam pro-Palestinian campus occupations
- 2025 Utrecht University pro-Palestinian campus occupations
- List of pro-Palestinian protests in the Netherlands
