= 2025 Radboud University Nijmegen pro-Palestinian campus occupations =

- Part of Gaza war protests (at universities (in 2025 in the Netherlands))
- Date: 14 April – 1 June 2025
- Location: Radboud University Nijmegen, Netherlands
- Caused by: Israeli military actions in Gaza; calls to sever university ties with Israeli institutions
- Goals: Suspension or termination of partnerships with Israeli universities; Academic boycott of Israel; Institutional transparency and accountability
- Methods: Building occupations; Encampments; Demonstrations and marches; Dialogue with university administration
- Result: Multiple police interventions and arrests; Cancellation of some university events; Suspension of partnerships with two Israeli universities

Casualties
- Injuries: Some reported injuries, including a student bitten by a police dog
- Arrested: Multiple detentions during police interventions
- Damage: Some vandalism and graffiti reported

The 2025 Radboud University Nijmegen pro-Palestinian campus occupations are a series of protests, building occupations, and encampments by students and activists of the Radboud University in the Netherlands. The protesters demand that the termination of academic partnerships with Israeli institutions in response to the ongoing Gaza war and the genocide of Palestinians. The protests include occupations of the university library, bridges, and other campus facilities.

== Background ==
The protests were part of a broader wave of pro-Palestinian activism on university campuses across the Netherlands and internationally in 2024–2025, sparked by Israel's military offensive in Gaza and calls for academic and financial divestment from institutions linked to the Israeli state.

== Timeline of events ==
=== March ===
On 11 March, a lecture by zionist activist Rawan Osman at Radboud University was disrupted by protests and repeated interruptions. Osman, invited by the advocacy group StandWithUs Netherlands, was scheduled to speak about her "ideological shift from antisemitism to Zionism". Her presence sparked controversy, drawing around 40 demonstrators to the Spinoza Building, where they protested with chants, drums, and signs, arguing that the university should not platform speakers with such views amid ongoing genocide of Palestinians. Inside the lecture hall, several activists interrupted Osman's talk with statements criticizing Israeli actions in Gaza. Security and police escorted multiple individuals from the room, while additional protestors outside attempted to disrupt the event by banging on windows. The university had implemented heightened security measures in anticipation of tensions, including controlled access to the building and police presence. Originally slated to occur at Radboudumc, the lecture was relocated to the Spinoza Building after the hospital declined to host the event, citing its focus on healthcare and research. The disruptions ultimately prevented Osman from delivering a complete lecture, though she expressed strong criticism of the protests and reiterated her support for Israel during the event.

On 18 March, a group of about 50 activists demonstrated between the Maria Montessori Building and the Lecture Halls Complex of the university. The protest ended with police intervention, with some activists being beaten by the police and two activists being arrested.

=== April ===
On 14 April, a group of activists occupied the air bridge between De Refter and the University Library, as well as part of a corridor in the Lecture Hall complex. The university administration ordered the activists to leave by closing time, warning that police would be called if they remained. The activists left on their own on 15 April. Following the eviction, the university closed several buildings temporarily and rescheduled classes. The Culture Café was also closed during this period.

=== May ===
On 7 May, a protest at Radboud University in Nijmegen organized by students and staff was met with a significant police response, including the deployment of dog units. The demonstration, led by the Nijmegen Student Intifada, was aimed at protesting the university's ties to Israeli institutions. Tensions escalated after a failed dialogue attempt between students and the Executive Board, resulting in security staff using physical force against demonstrators. Subsequently, police intervened, arresting three students and injuring several others. One student was hospitalized with injuries from a riot police dog. The student group has announced legal action against the Executive Board and local police, citing excessive force and suppression of peaceful protest.

On 12 May, the university published a statement regarding its partnerships with two Israeli universities and announced a framework for assessing collaborations with institutions in conflict zones.

On 13 May, pro-Palestinian demonstrators established a tent camp near the Huygens building on campus. The Executive Board allowed the camp to remain temporarily under strict conditions related to safety, cleanliness, accessibility, and the continuation of teaching and research.

On 19 May, university representatives engaged in dialogue with protest spokespersons, inviting up to four protesters for a follow-up discussion under conditions prohibiting face coverings.

On the night of 23 May, police ended the peaceful occupation of the Radboud University Library. Around 20 activists from the Nijmegen Student Encampment had occupied the library's reading room starting at 20:00, hanging Palestinian flags and banners and later setting up symbolic tents. When asked to leave at the 22:00 closing time, the group refused, stating they would remain until the university fully severed ties with all Israeli institutions. Although Radboud had recently ended cooperation with two Israeli partners, the demonstrators deemed this insufficient in light of the ongoing humanitarian crisis in Gaza. The university described the occupation as a disturbance of the peace and called the police shortly after midnight.

On 26 May, the Executive Board, rector, and a dean met with four protesters for a one-hour discussion covering the suspension of ties with Israeli institutions, the use of the term genocide, and campus safety. A follow-up meeting was proposed.

=== June ===
On the night of 1 June, the protesters had dispersed, leaving behind the graffitied message "We will be back".

== Reactions ==
Radboud University sought to balance the right to protest with campus safety and academic continuity. The Executive Board engaged in dialogue with protesters while also enforcing building closures and calling police when occupations violated university policies.

The protests disrupted some academic activities and campus events, raised awareness of the university's ties with Israeli institutions, and prompted institutional reflection on partnerships in conflict contexts. The university cancelled some events, such as the BBB Career Event, citing safety concerns.

The university suspended partnerships with two Israeli universities and developed an assessment framework for future collaborations with institutions in conflict zones.

In March 2026, the police officer that deployed a dog to attack a student was prosecuted since the Public Prosecution Service found that the victim did not pose any threat.

== See also ==
- List of pro-Palestinian protests in the Netherlands
- 2024 Radboud University Nijmegen pro-Palestinian campus occupations
- 2025 pro-Palestinian protests on university campuses in the Netherlands
- 2025 Utrecht University pro-Palestinian campus occupations
- Academic boycott of Israel
- Boycott, Divestment, and Sanctions
