= Site Recorder =

Software system for archaeology field data

- Developer(s): 3H Consulting Ltd
- Stable release: 4
- Written in: C++
- Operating system: Windows
- Type: Geographic information system
- Website: www.3hconsulting.com

Site Recorder is a geographical information system (GIS) and information management system (IMS) designed for use in maritime, freshwater and intertidal archaeology. Site Recorder can be used on maritime and intertidal archaeology projects for real-time data collection, decision support, publication, archiving and data migration. The program is designed for use by archaeologists rather than GIS experts.

Site Recorder can replace the many separate surveying, drawing, finds handing and reporting programs usually used on site. Site plans can be drawn that connect the positions of finds drawn on the plan with the positions of survey points, so the plans adapt and improve as more survey and recording data is added.

Site Recorder can be used for all phases of an archaeological project:

- Excavation recording
- Site assessment and monitoring
- Survey planning and recording
- Publication and reporting
- Reprocessing existing site data
- Resource evaluation and management
- Archiving
- Tracking boats, divers and remotely operated underwater vehicles (ROVs)
- Data collection application for publication web sites

== Research ==
Site Recorder has been used as a tool in the research into digital recording during archaeological excavations and for electronic publication of full documentary archives from sites. As part of this, a core database schema for recording maritime shipwreck sites has been developed and published.

Site Recorder and its predecessor program Site Surveyor have also been used for research into survey methods that can be used on sites underwater. From this research the Site Recorder SE (Student Edition) software was developed and made freely available to allow all archaeological projects access to high accuracy surveying ability. Site Recorder SE was adopted by the Nautical Archaeology Society training program in 2006.

== Significant projects ==
Site Recorder, Site Recorder SE, and Site Surveyor have been used on a number of significant archaeological projects:

- The excavation of the Mary Rose in 2003-2005 by the Mary Rose Trust
- The excavation of the Kizilburun shipwreck by the [Institute of Nautical Archaeology]
- Reprocessing of the documentary archive from the USS Monitor by NOAA
- Mapping the wreck of HMS Firebrand (1694) in the Isles of Scilly by CISMAS.
- The excavation at Pabuc Burnu in Turkey by the Institute of Nautical Archaeology in 2002
- Mapping the wreck of HMS Colossus (1787) in the Isles of Scilly by Kevin Camidge
- Geophysical survey and documentary archive publication on the Cattewater Wreck in [Plymouth] by the University of Plymouth and 3H Consulting Ltd.
- Reprocessing and publication of the documentary archive from the Resurgam submarine in 2008.
- The excavation of the Tile Wreck by ADMAT in the Dominican Republic in 2008
- The survey and excavation at Tektas Burnu in Turkey by the Institute of Nautical Archaeology.
- The excavation of HMS Pandora in Australia by the Queensland Museum
- Galle Harbour maritime archaeological impact assessment by the Western Australian Museum in 2007
- Documentation of the historic vessel Wawona by East Carolina University.

== See also ==
- Object-based spatial database
