= Resurgam =

Name of two Victorian submarines

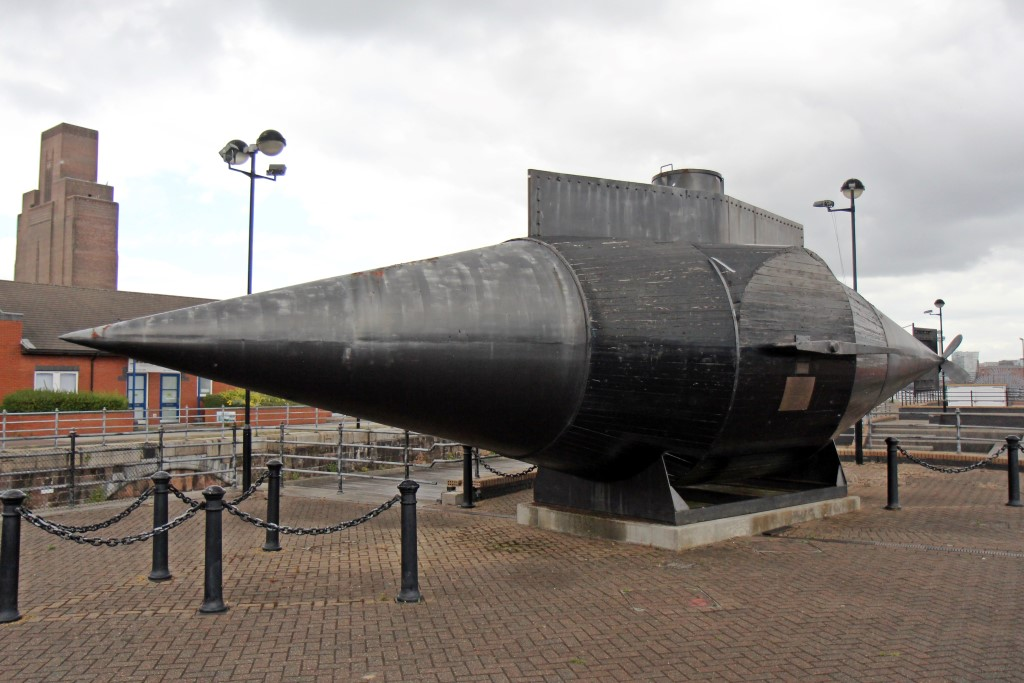
A replica of the Resurgam, built in 1878–79. The replica was built in 1997 and is on display close to the Woodside terminal of the Mersey Ferry in Birkenhead, Wirral

Resurgam (Latin: "I shall rise again") is an early submarine from the Victorian era and its prototype, designed and built in Britain by Reverend George Garrett. She was intended as a weapon to penetrate the chain netting placed around ship hulls to defend against attack by torpedo vessels.

== Resurgam I ==
The first Resurgam, built in 1878-79, was a 14 ft (5 m), hand-powered, one-man vessel nicknamed "the curate's egg" because of her shape. She was a one-third size prototype for Garrett's design.

== Resurgam II ==
=== Construction ===
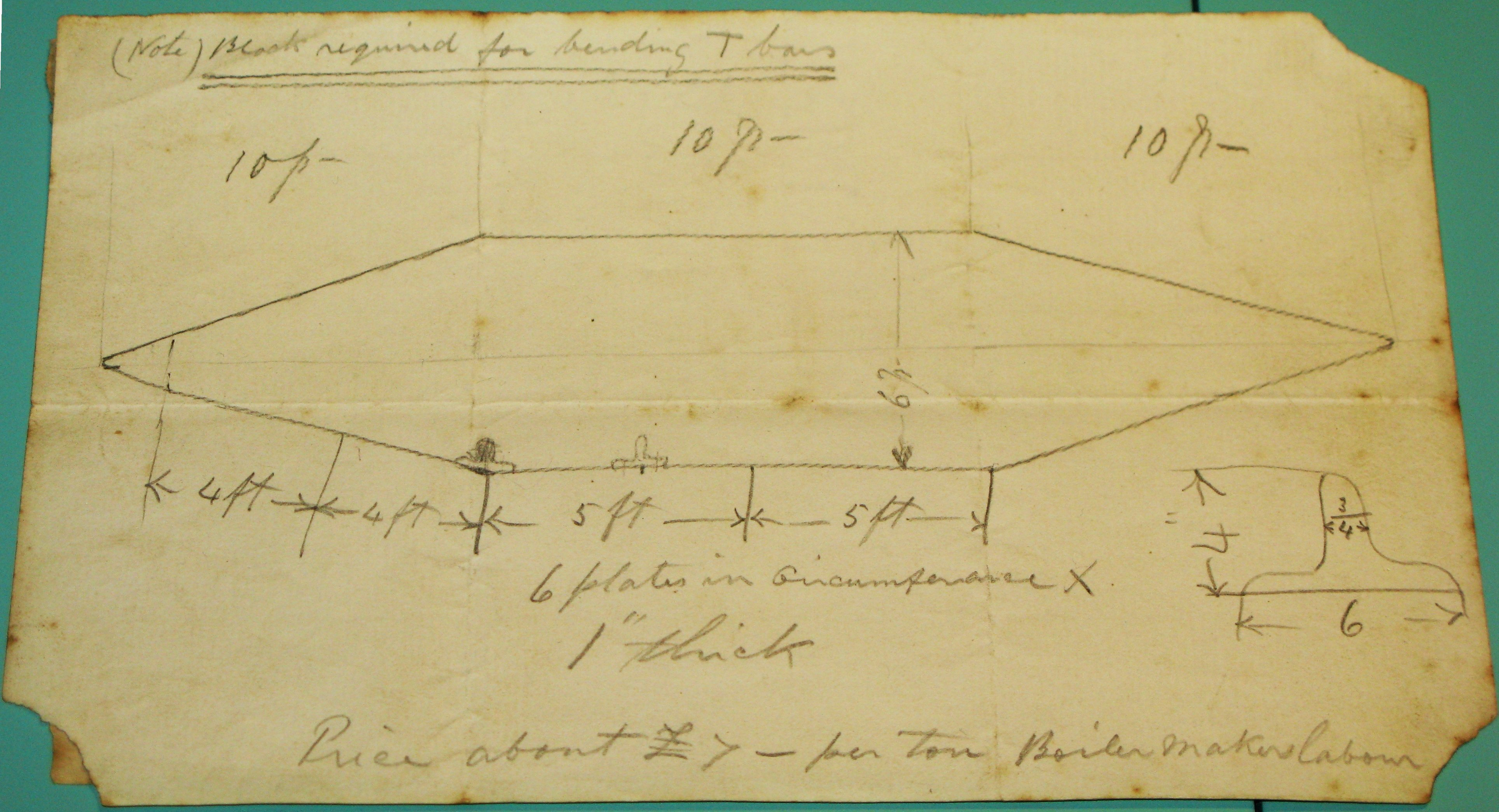
Sketch of the design of Resurgam II by George Garrett

The second Resurgam was built by Cochran & Co. at Birkenhead and launched on 26 November 1879. Her construction was of iron plates fastened to iron frames, with the central section of the vessel clad with wood secured by iron straps. As built, she was 45 feet (14 m) long by 10 feet (3.0 m) in diameter, weighed 30 long tons (30 t), and had a crew of three. She was powered by a closed-cycle steam engine originally patented in 1872 by the American engineer Emile Lamm, which provided enough steam to turn the single propeller for up to four hours. She was designed to have positive buoyancy, and diving was controlled by a pair of hydroplanes amidships. At the time she cost £1,538.

After successful trials in the East Float at Wallasey, it was planned that Resurgam should make her way under her own power from Birkenhead to Portsmouth for a demonstration to the Royal Navy.

=== Loss ===
On 10 December 1879 Resurgam, crewed by Garrett, Jackson (as skipper) and Price (engineer) set out for Portsmouth. However, during the voyage mechanical problems caused the crew to dock at Foryd Harbour, Rhyl, for repairs. Once completed, and after trials, the crew set sail on the night of 24 February 1880 in a high wind, towed by the steam yacht Elphin, which Garrett had bought to act as a tender. The Elphin developed engine problems and the Resurgam's crew transferred to her to assist. Because the entry hatch on the Resurgam could not be fastened from outside, the submarine began to ship water and the tow-rope broke under the added weight, the Resurgam sank in Liverpool Bay off Rhyl on 25 February 1880.

=== Discovery of wreck ===
For many years the exact location of Resurgam was a mystery. In 1995, she was found by a wreck diver, Keith Hurley, while he was attempting to clear snagged fishing nets in 60 feet (18 m) of water. On 4 July 1996 Resurgam was designated protected wreck No. 42 under the Protection of Wrecks Act. The site of the wreck covers an area 900 feet (270 m) in radius at 53°23.78′N 03°33.18′W.

The Resurgam's hull is intact although partially damaged and remains at risk from illegal diving and trawling. Since her discovery, the conning tower steering wheel has been broken and portable items have gone missing.

In 1997, a project called SUBMAP was undertaken by the Archaeological Diving Unit to study the wreck site. Over 100 volunteer divers, coordinated by the Nautical Archaeology Society, surveyed the structure of the hull and the colonising marine life around it, using remote sensing equipment to search for debris in the surrounding area. The results of the SUBMAP project have been published as a comprehensive digital archive using Site Recorder. The wreck is currently protected against further corrosion by sacrificial anodes that had been attached to the hull. Plans to raise her have so far not been fruitful.

Resurgam was featured in the TV programme Wreck Detectives in 2004. In 2007, divers from the British Sub-Aqua Club in Trafford undertook conservation work, placing zinc sacrificial anodes on the wreck. In 2012 divers from the British Sub-Aqua Club in Chester replaced sacrificial anodes on the wreck.

== Replica ==
A replica of the vessel was built by trainees at the AMARC Training College attached to the Cammell Laird shipyard, Birkenhead, in 1996–97. She was put on display at Woodside Ferry Terminal, Birkenhead, in March 1997.

Students of the North West Maritime and Engineering College refurbished the replica in 2009, after it had fallen into disrepair.

== See also ==
- Plongeur
- Ictineo II
