= 2025 Utrecht University pro-Palestinian campus occupations =

2025 student protests at Utrecht University

2025 Utrecht University pro-Palestinian campus occupation
- Part of Gaza war protests (at universities (in 2025 in the Netherlands))
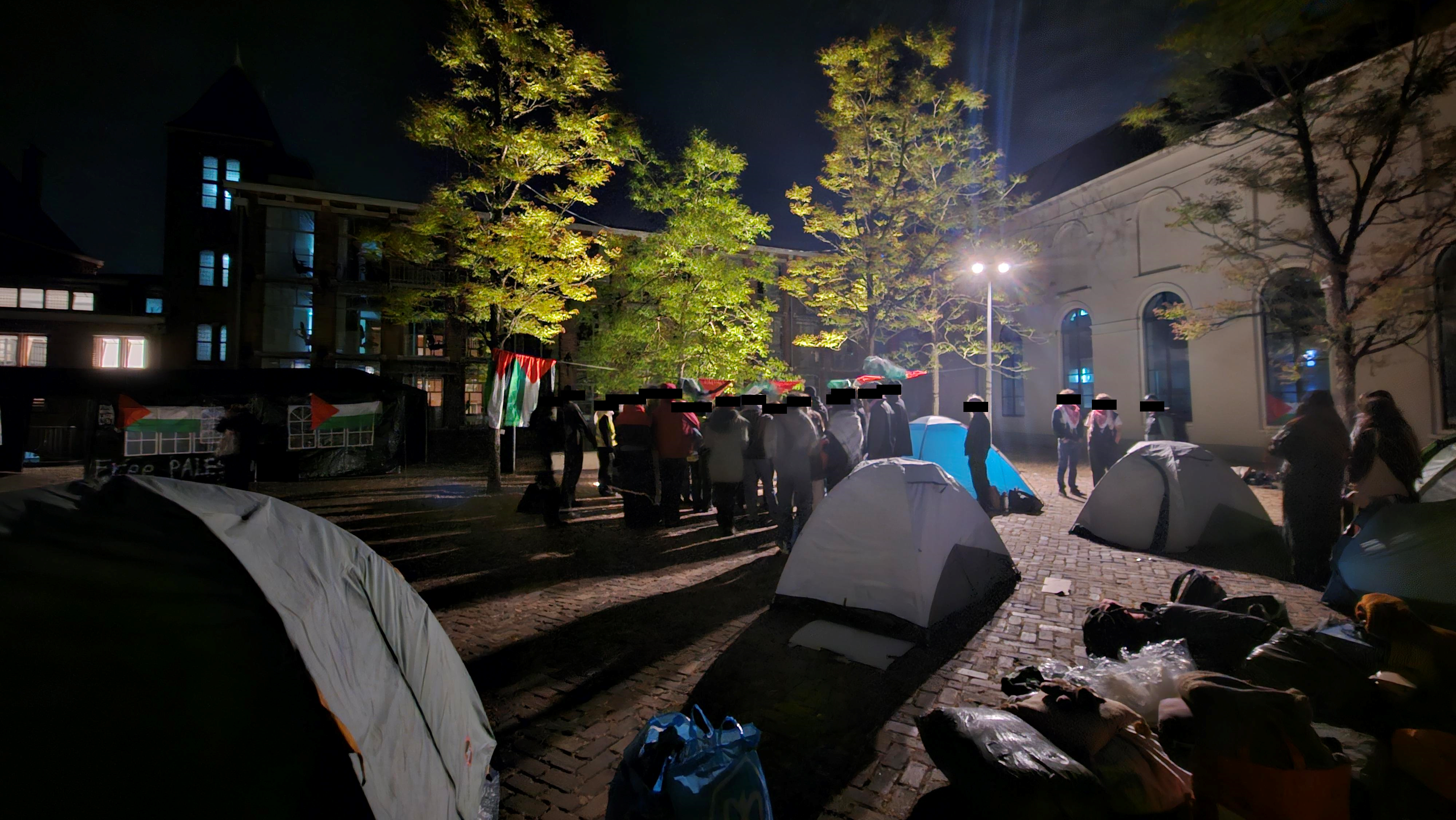
- Pro-Palestine protesters hold a meeting during one of the encampment nights at the Utrecht University library's courtyard.
- Date: March – December 2025
- Location: Utrecht University, Netherlands
- Caused by: Institutional ties with Israeli universities and companies
- Goals: Severing of academic and financial ties with Israeli institutions and the recognition of the Palestinian genocide
- Methods: Encampments, occupations, protests

The 2025 Utrecht University student protests are a series of demonstrations and encampments initiated by students and staff at Utrecht University in the Netherlands. Following several smaller protests earlier that year, after May 2025 protesters established an encampment and other occupations on university grounds to demand that the university sever all academic and financial ties with Israeli institutions and companies in response to the ongoing Gaza war and the genocide of Palestinians.

== Background ==
The protests took place amid widespread global demonstrations in support of Palestinian rights and criticism of the role of the Israeli military in the genocide of Palestinians. In 2024 in the Netherlands, students began organizing encampments and protest actions similar to those seen on campuses in the United States and elsewhere in Europe. In 2025, similar student protests and encampments were happening across the Netherlands, where some were met with police violence.

== Protests, encampments, and occupations ==
=== Administration building ===
On 4 March 2025, pro-Palestinian activists chained themselves to the entrance of the administration building at Utrecht University in the Utrecht Science Park, temporarily blocking access. A demonstration was also held in front, reaching about 50 participants.

On 20 March 2025, activists blocked again the entrance of the administration building at Utrecht University in the Utrecht Science Park. The protest followed a previous blockade and a ten-day ultimatum that the university did not meet. While the building remained accessible via emergency exits, approximately 150 employees were inside during the action. Protesters, accusing the university of complicity in genocide and apartheid, organized cultural and educational activities during the demonstration. The protest called on the university to sever all its institutional ties with Israeli partners.

=== Utrecht University Library courtyard ===
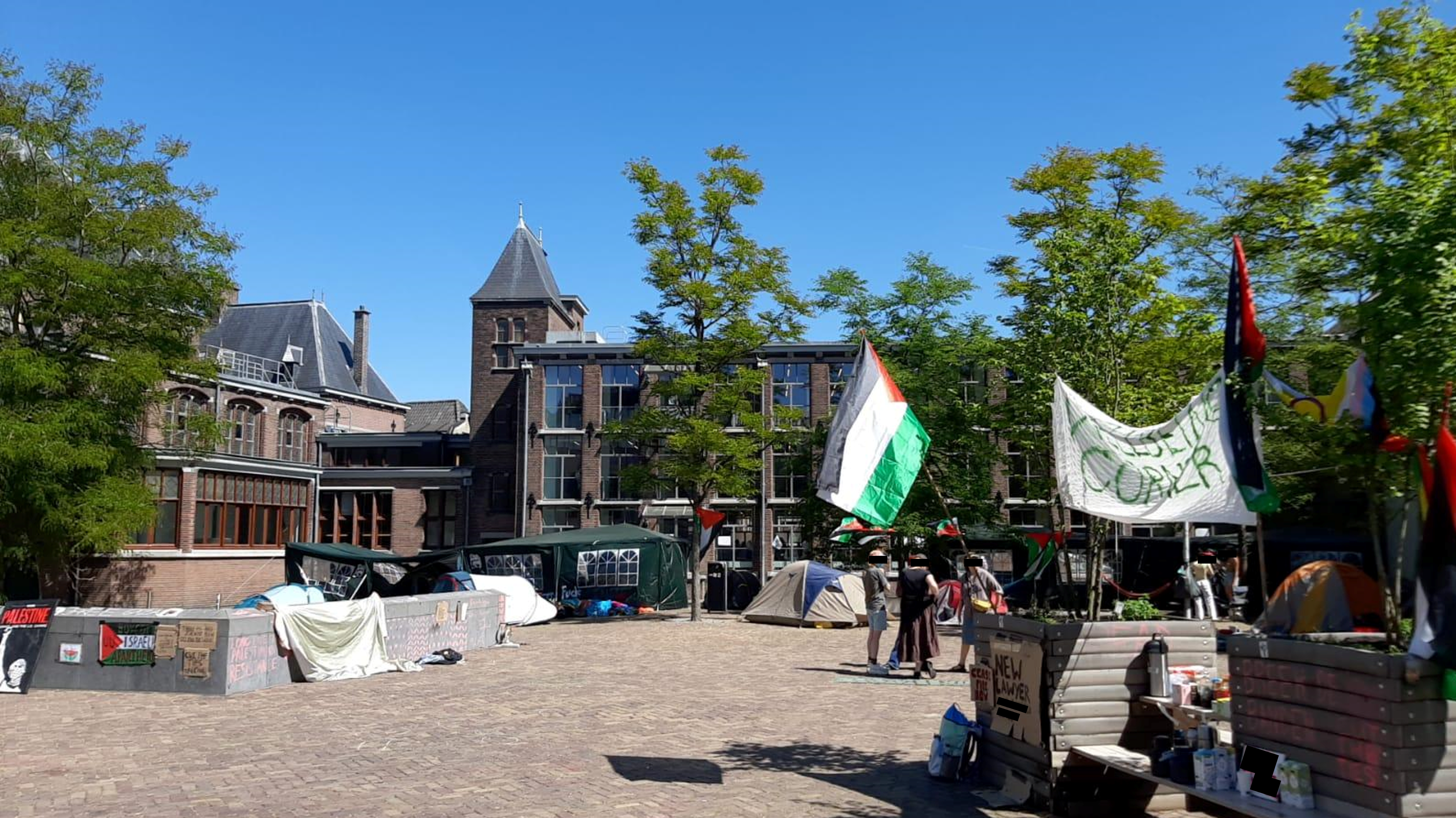
Section (well-being corner) of the pro-Palestine student encampments at the Utrecht University library's courtyard.

On 7 May, a year after the previous attempt at a student encampment in the same location, students and staff set up tents and banners in the courtyard of the academic library of Utrecht University. The occupation is ongoing and has not been met yet with police intervention. The encampment was established as a permanent protest site and features daily teach-ins, workshops, public lectures, documentary screenings, and community discussions. The encampment was named in honor of Palestinian journalist Hossam Shabat that was killed on 24 March 2025 by an Israeli airstrike. The occupation lasted until 19 May.

=== Drift 13 building ===
On 19 May, the thirteenth consecutive day of the encampment, protesters also occupied Drift 13, a Utrecht University building, to protest what they viewed as insufficient action by the university regarding its ties to Israeli institutions. The occupation followed the university's announcement that it would suspend new collaborations with Israeli partners and end select agreements, including those with the Israeli Ministry of Health and the University of Haifa. Activists argued this does not go far enough, as existing collaborations remain intact.

Dutch police intervenes with violence on peaceful pro-Palestinian students and staff outside Utrecht University building Drift 13 on 19 May 2025. Blur is used to hide graphic content and protesters identities.

On 19 May, Dutch police intervened in the pro-Palestinian occupation of Drift 13 building on Drift street. Dozens of demonstrators had entered the building earlier in the day, demanding that the university cut all institutional ties with Israeli companies and institutes. After repeated orders to vacate, police entered the premises and forcibly removed the students. Outside of the building, several protesters were also hit with police violence, with some sustaining injuries. The riot police arrested 49 individuals for trespassing and transported them by bus to another location in Utrecht, with most being released later that night. Lawyer Daan Gaasbeek, representing some of the demonstrators, announced that legal action is being prepared against the police, alleging excessive force, including overhead baton strikes.

=== Janskerkhof 15a building ===
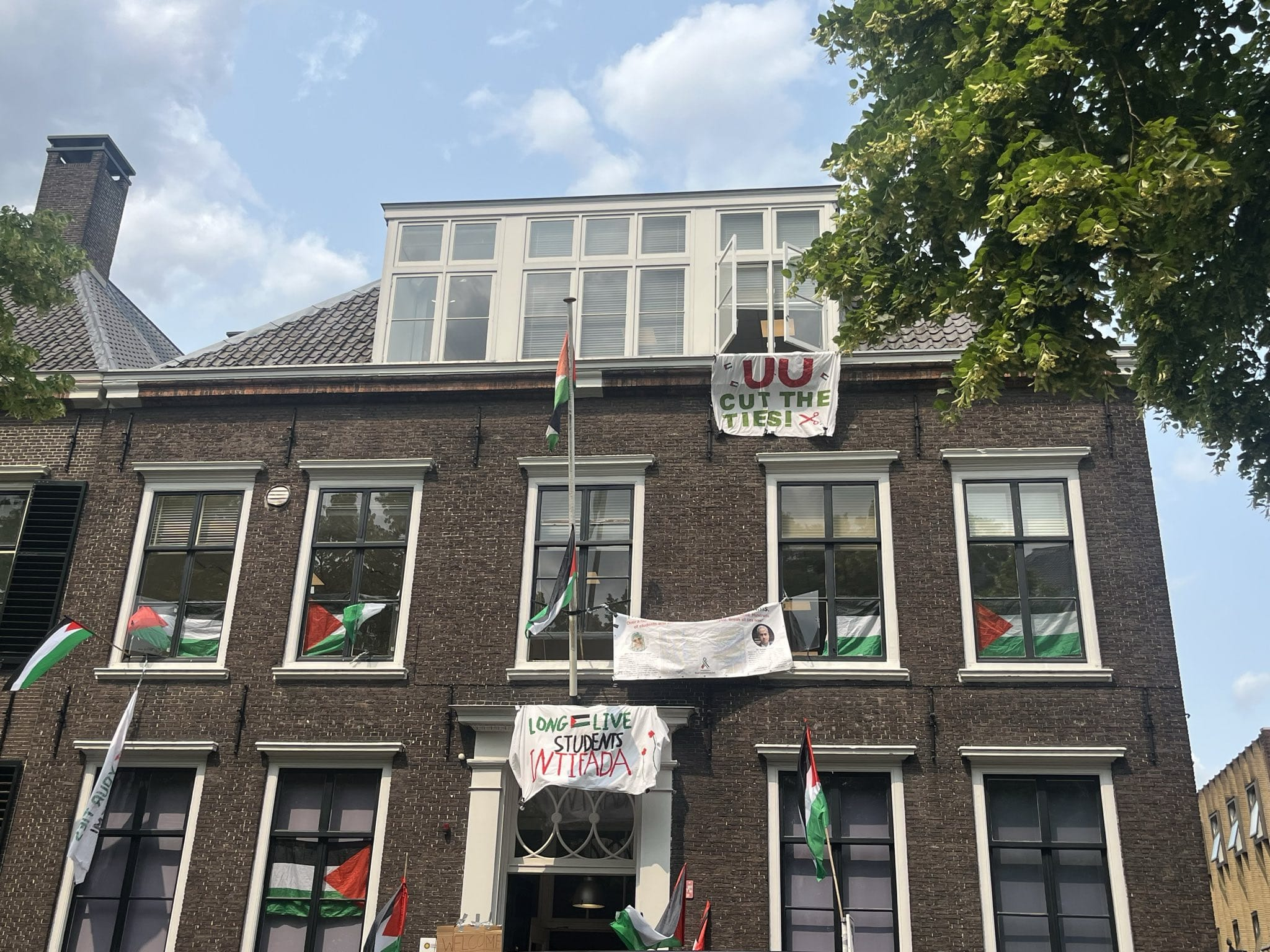
Flags and banners being displayed during the pro-Palestinian occupation of the Utrecht University Janskerkhof 15a building in June 2025.

On 3 June, protesters established a new peaceful occupation of another university building, Janskerkhof 15a, after what they claim is insufficient action from the university. Lectures were not disrupted. On the morning of 4 June, following the overnight occupation of the Janskerkhof 15a building, the police and Executive Board gave the demonstrators a final eviction warning. The activists evacuated the building peacefully and voluntarily. The Executive Board recognized the current situation in Palestine, citing the blockades of food and aid and the forced displacement of residents being carried out by the Israeli government. It also encouraged the students to continue to let their voices be heard through the existing channels in the university, but made no promises regarding the future of the existing collaborations with Israeli institutes.

=== Drift 25 building ===
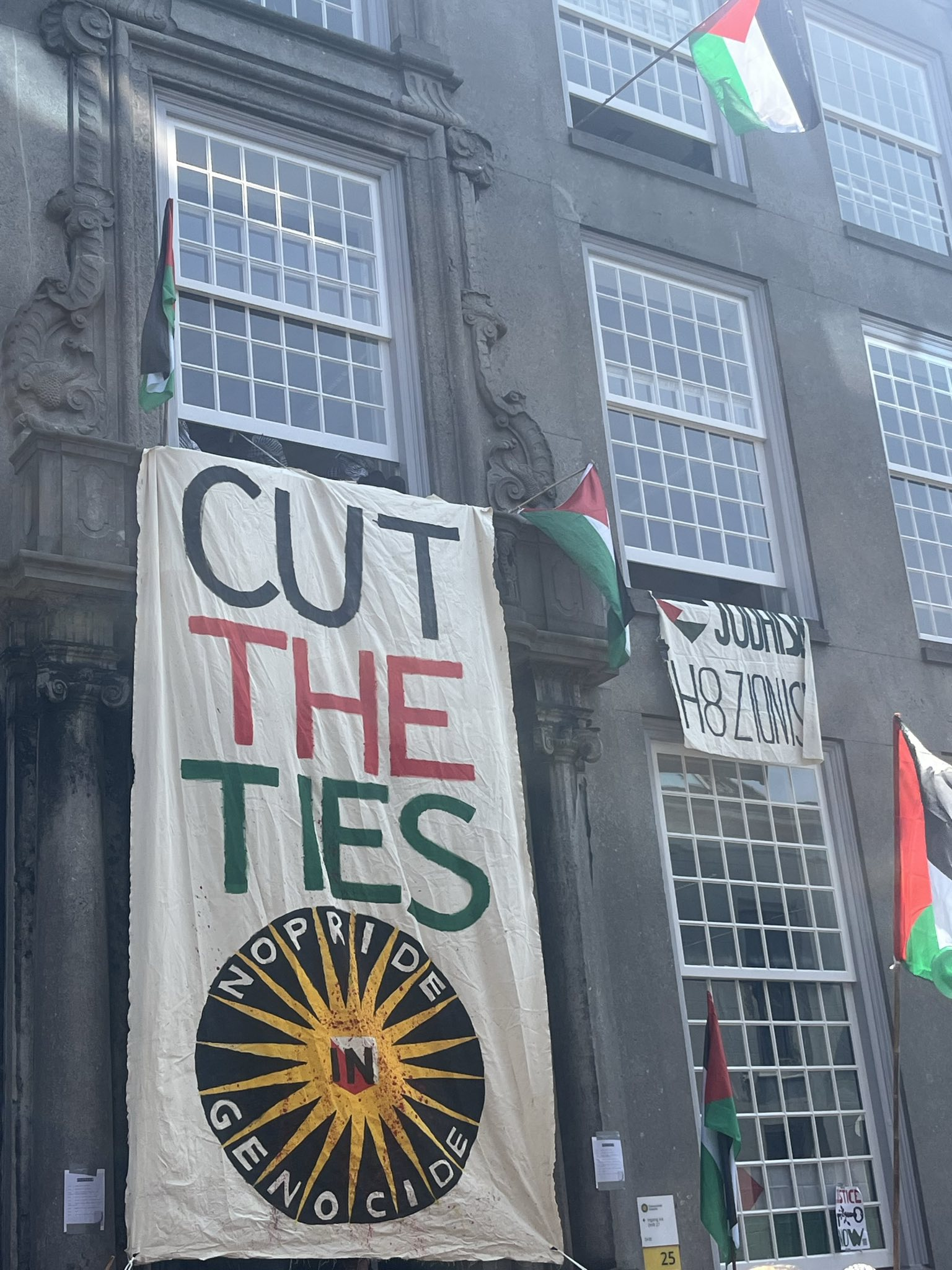
Banners hanging from the university building Drift 25 with messages "Cut the ties, no pride in genocide", "<3 (love) Judaism, H8 (hate) Zionism", and "Justice now".

On 18 June, pro-Palestinian activists blocked parts of Drift, a street in Utrecht, and occupied the university building at Drift 25, prompting the university to close the University Library and other nearby buildings. The protesters demand that the university sever all ties with Israeli institutions and intend to remain until their demands are met. Although the street blockade has ended and the library has since reopened to those with a university pass, other buildings on Drift remain closed. The occupation lasted until 20 June, when police entered via a crawlspace only to find the building already completely empty.

On 30 September, about a dozen of activists re-occupied the Drift 25 building. The protesters demand a full boycott of Israeli institutions, which the university has still refused to do. Lasted until 2 October with protesters disbanding on their own.

On 2 December, the building was re-occupied by about 20 activists. The protesters renamed the building after Dr. Hussam Abu Safiya, a Palestinian doctor and director of the Kamal Adwan Hospital in Gaza that was kidnapped by the Israeli army. University activities in the building have been canceled or moved to other locations. The occupation lasted uninterrupted until 14 December, with the protesters disbanding on their own.

=== Koningsberger building ===
On 21 November, a group of about 20 pro-Palestinian activists formed a picket-line outside the entrance to the Koningsberger building, which was hosting the university's open day. Protesters handed out stickers and flyers to potential new students with information on ongoing ties between the university and Israeli institutions and companies.

== Reactions ==
On 15 May, staff members of the Contesting Governance Platform from the Utrecht University issued a statement supporting the student encampment, endorsing its call for the university to cut ties with Israeli institutions linked to human rights violations against Palestinians.

On 16 May, Utrecht University announced its intention to end a project involving the Israeli Ministry of Health and to suspend new collaborations with Israeli organizations, citing concerns over the Israeli government's actions in Gaza and the West Bank. Existing ties will continue for now, while an advisory committee is being formed to evaluate future collaborations.

On 20 May, the Executive Board of the university condemned the occupation of the Drift 13 building, and made no mentions about disproportionate police intervention. The UCU Teachers Against Genocide condemned the police brutality against the students and staff, and showed support for their right to protest. The Utrecht mayor Sharon Dijksma also criticized the violence by the police, stating that they were instructed to act in a phased, de-escalating, and non-violent manner. In response, police officers expressed anger at Dijksma's public remarks, with some suggesting they no longer wished to operate under her authority.

Over the following days, several groups of teachers and staff of the university also expressed support for the demands of the protesters and condemned the police intervention on campus. A group of over 60 professors from the university submitted a letter to the Executive Board criticizing its tightened policy on collaborations with Israeli institutions as insufficient, given the ongoing violence in Palestine. The letter, accompanied by a petition, argued that universities must act when fundamental values are at stake, citing precedents like UU's previous decisions to cut ties with the fossil fuel industry and Russian institutions. The Executive Board has indicated it will enter into dialogue with the professors.

On 1 September, Rector Wilco Hazeleger acknowledged the student protests and claimed the university would engage in a boycott of Israeli institutions. This boycott, however, does not include collaborations or projects via the Horizon Europe program.

On 10 December, after over a week of occupation, the university filed charges against the protesters of the Drift 25 building for trespassing. The Public Prosecution Service, however, declared "no reason to intervene".

== See also ==
- Student activism
- Academic boycotts of Israel
- Boycott, Divestment and Sanctions
- 2024 Utrecht University pro-Palestinian campus occupations
- 2025 Radboud University Nijmegen pro-Palestinian campus occupations
- List of pro-Palestinian protests in the Netherlands
