= Kizilburun shipwreck =

The Kizilburun shipwreck (meaning Crimson Cape) is an ancient Roman shipwreck in the Aegean that was discovered in 1993 by Dr. Cemal Pulak. The wreck itself is located just off the western coast of Turkey, near the island of Chios and the city of Çeşme. The coordinates of the wreck are 38.26075°N 26.24256°E. The ship itself was a Navis Lapidera, or Roman stone carrying ship. The wreck was found at a depth of 45–48 meters or around 150 feet.

== Excavation ==
In 1993, a survey was carried out in the Chios Straits by Dr. Cemal Pulak and the Institute of Nautical Archaeology. During the survey, a number of shipwrecks were found, one of them being a Late Hellenistic Stone Carrier. Among the wreckage, 8 marble column drums with dimensions of 3 feet in height and 5-5.5 feet in diameter were found. Also found were a number of marble blocks, 6 blank gravestones, a number of roughly quarried marble basins and pedestals believed to be associated with one another, one corroded coin that is believed to be Greek, a double-bladed axe head, an adze, a chisel and nail remover, metal cauldrons, ceramic jugs, bronze handles, cookware including undecorated plates and pans, fine Hellenistic tableware such as grey-ware, mold-made bowls, black glaze cups and bowls, and one example of a terracotta Herm figurine.

Further analysis of the column drums shows that they would have each fit together to form one 30-foot Doric column. The location of the shipwreck indicates that it was traveling from the marble quarries on the island of Proconnesos in the Sea of Marmara to the Temple of Apollo at Claros. This would date the shipwreck sometime between 125 and 25 BC.

One of the main challenges to overcome was how to hoist the drums off of the shipwreck without disturbing the delicate wooden hull remains beneath. This was accomplished using various devices attached to large lift bags. In 2009 and again in 2011 the marble pieces were raised to the surface and transported to the Institute of Nautical Archaeology's research center in Bodrum, Turkey, where they are currently being cleaned and analyzed.
