= Maya Wind =

Israeli anthropologist and scholar of militarism and higher education

- מאיה ווינד
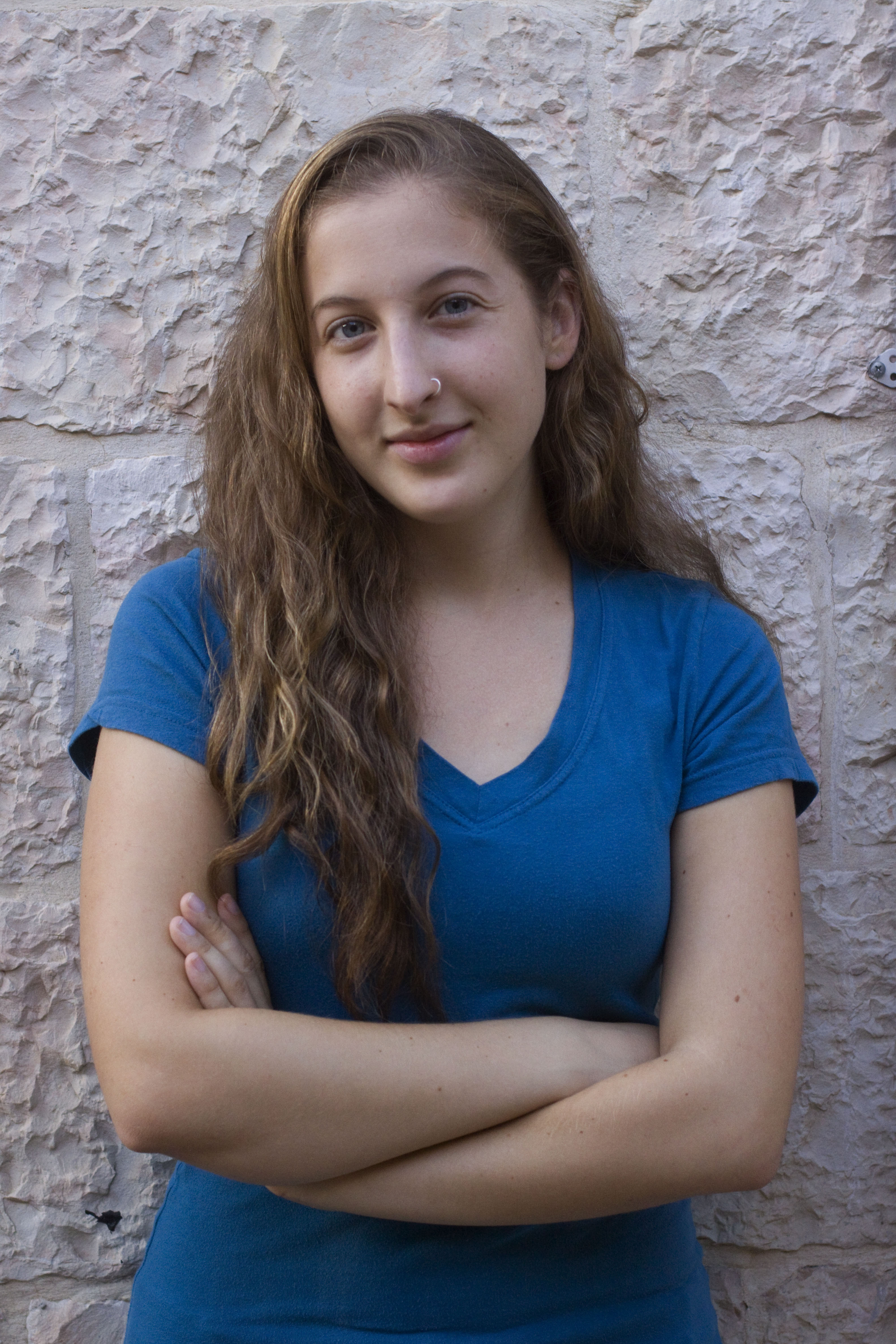
- Maya Wind in 2009
- Born: Israel
- Occupations: Anthropologist, researcher, author
- Employer(s): University of British Columbia; University of California, Riverside
- Known for: Critique of Israeli academia; author of Towers of Ivory and Steel

Maya Wind (Hebrew: מאיה ווינד) is an Israeli anthropologist, researcher, and author specializing in the study of militarism, settler societies, and the role of higher education in conflict. Wind is best known for criticizing the alleged complicity of Israeli universities in what she calls the genocide of Palestinians in her 2024 book, Towers of Ivory and Steel: How Israeli Universities Deny Palestinian Freedom.

== Academic career ==
Wind received her PhD in American Studies from New York University. Her research investigates how settler societies and global systems of militarism and policing are sustained, with a particular focus on the reproduction and export of Israeli security expertise. She has received research support from the National Science Foundation, the Social Science Research Council, and the Killam Laureates Trust.

At the University of British Columbia, Wind has served as a Killam Postdoctoral Fellow in Anthropology. She is also affiliated with the University of California, Riverside, where she is a President's and Andrew W. Mellon Postdoctoral Fellow in the Departments of Black Study and Media & Cultural Studies.

== Research and activism ==
Wind's scholarship centers on the intersection of academia, militarism, and settler-colonial projects. Her work critically examines the ways Israeli universities are implicated in the occupation of Palestinian territories, the suppression of Palestinian academic freedom, and the export of Israeli security models. She collaborates with local and transnational coalitions organizing for abolition, demilitarization, and decolonization.

== Towers of Ivory and Steel ==
Wind's book, Towers of Ivory and Steel: How Israeli Universities Deny Palestinian Freedom (2024), is a major critical study of Israeli higher education. Drawing on ethnographic and archival research, Wind documents how Israeli universities are entangled with the state’s military and security apparatus, contributing to the occupation and repression of Palestinians. The book argues that Israeli universities serve as "pillars of Israel's system of oppression against Palestinians", providing research, training, and infrastructure for military operations, as well as suppressing Palestinian academic life and dissent.

The book has been described as "a powerful exposé" and "paradigm-shifting", praised for its meticulous research and for challenging the myth of Israeli academia as a liberal bastion of free inquiry. Wind's work has been recognized as a significant contribution to debates on academic freedom, the academic boycott of Israel, and the global politics of higher education.

== Public engagement ==
Wind is active as a public intellectual, giving lectures and participating in events at universities internationally, including Utrecht University in the Netherlands, Trinity College Dublin in Ireland, and California State University Long Beach in the United States. She is frequently cited in discussions about the relationship between Israeli academia, militarism, and the suppression of Palestinian rights.
