= List of Gaza war protests at universities in the Netherlands in 2025 =

Dutch Gaza war protests at universities
- ← in 2024 in 2025; Part of Gaza war protests (at universities)
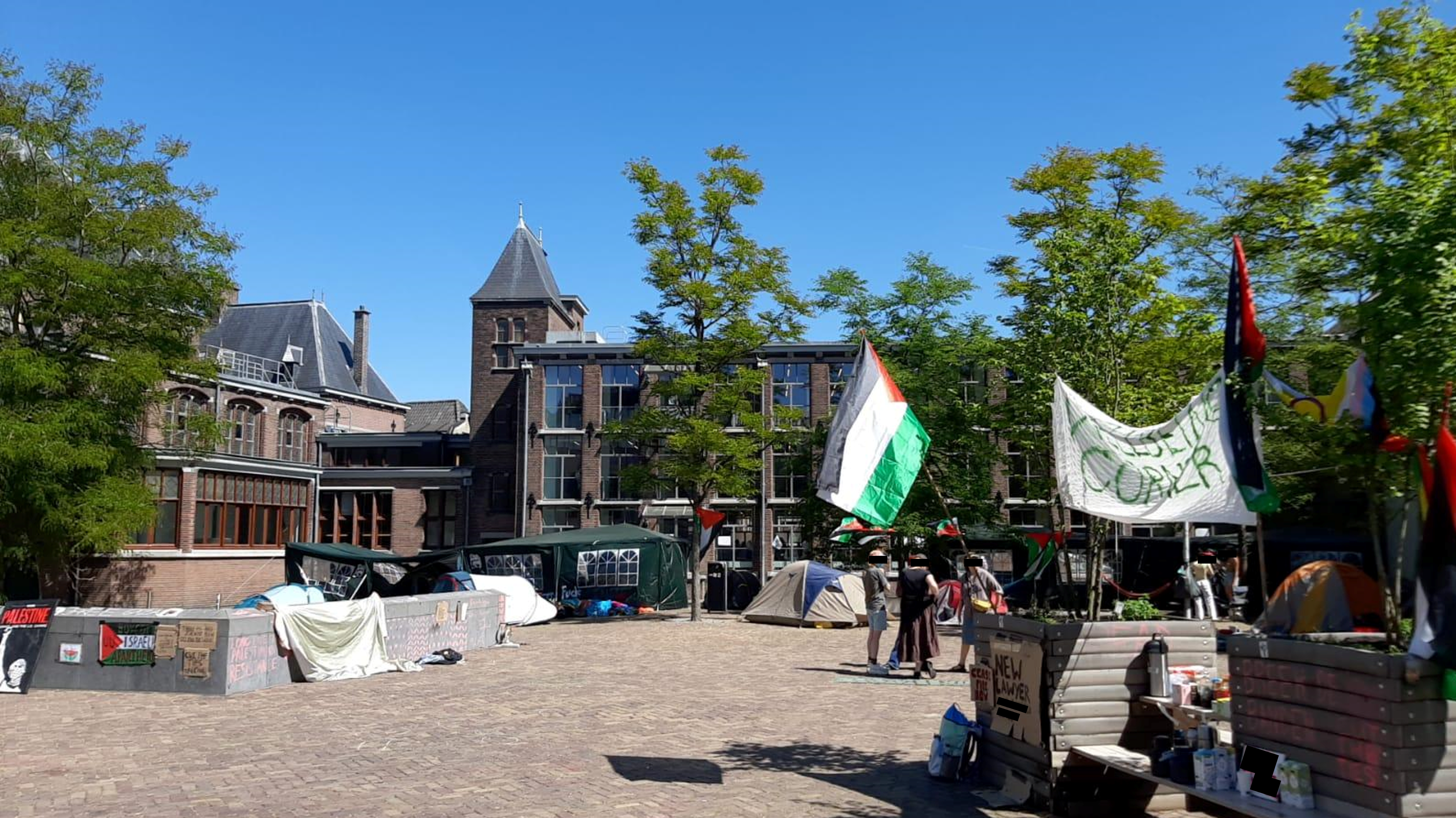
- Section (well-being corner) of the pro-Palestine student encampments at the Utrecht University library's courtyard.
- Date: January – September 2025
- Location: Universities throughout the Netherlands
- Caused by: Israeli invasion of Gaza and Dutch university ties with Israeli organizations
- Goals: End to Dutch university ties with Israeli academic and research institutions; Divestment from Israel and companies supplying the Israeli military; Greater transparency about institutional collaborations
- Methods: Protests; Encampments; Walkouts; Occupations; Sit-ins; Teach-ins

The 2025 pro-Palestinian protests on university campuses in the Netherlands are a series of demonstrations, encampments, and building occupations by students and staff at Dutch universities, demanding an end to institutional ties with Israeli academic and research organizations in response to the ongoing war in Gaza and accusations of a genocide committed by the Israel.

== Background ==
Protests against the genocide in Gaza and Dutch university ties with Israeli institutions began as early as October 2023, but escalated in the spring of 2025 following the Israeli offensive in Rafah, the increased awareness of war crimes committed by the Israeli army, and the spread of campus protests in the United States and Europe.

An investigation revealed that Dutch universities are involved in at least 28 EU-funded research projects with Israeli partners that may benefit the Israeli military, despite rules mandating civilian-only use. Demonstrators called for an academic boycott of Israel, divestment from companies supplying the Israeli military, and full transparency about institutional collaborations.

== Universities involved ==
=== Tilburg University ===
On 30 January, police ended an occupation by Palestine Solidarity Tilburg in the glass corridor of the Cobbenhagen building at Tilburg University. Around 40 protesters, including students and staff, opposed the university’s refusal to cut ties with Israeli institutions. Most demonstrators left voluntarily after a police order, but five remained seated and were escorted out without arrests. Protesters demanded either delivery of an open letter to Rector Wim van de Donk or a public debate. The university declined, stating it is open to dialogue but not under pressure, framing building occupation as a red line.

On 27 February, students and teachers protested with a silent sit-in against the inaction of the Executive board.

=== University of Groningen ===
On 31 January, a group of pro-Palestinian activists protested during the University of Groningen's Open Day, calling on the university to sever ties with Israeli organizations over the war in Gaza. Minor scuffles occurred between protesters and security personnel, but the situation remained under control. The university denies claims of investments in companies linked to the conflict, stating it does not invest public funds.

=== Utrecht University ===
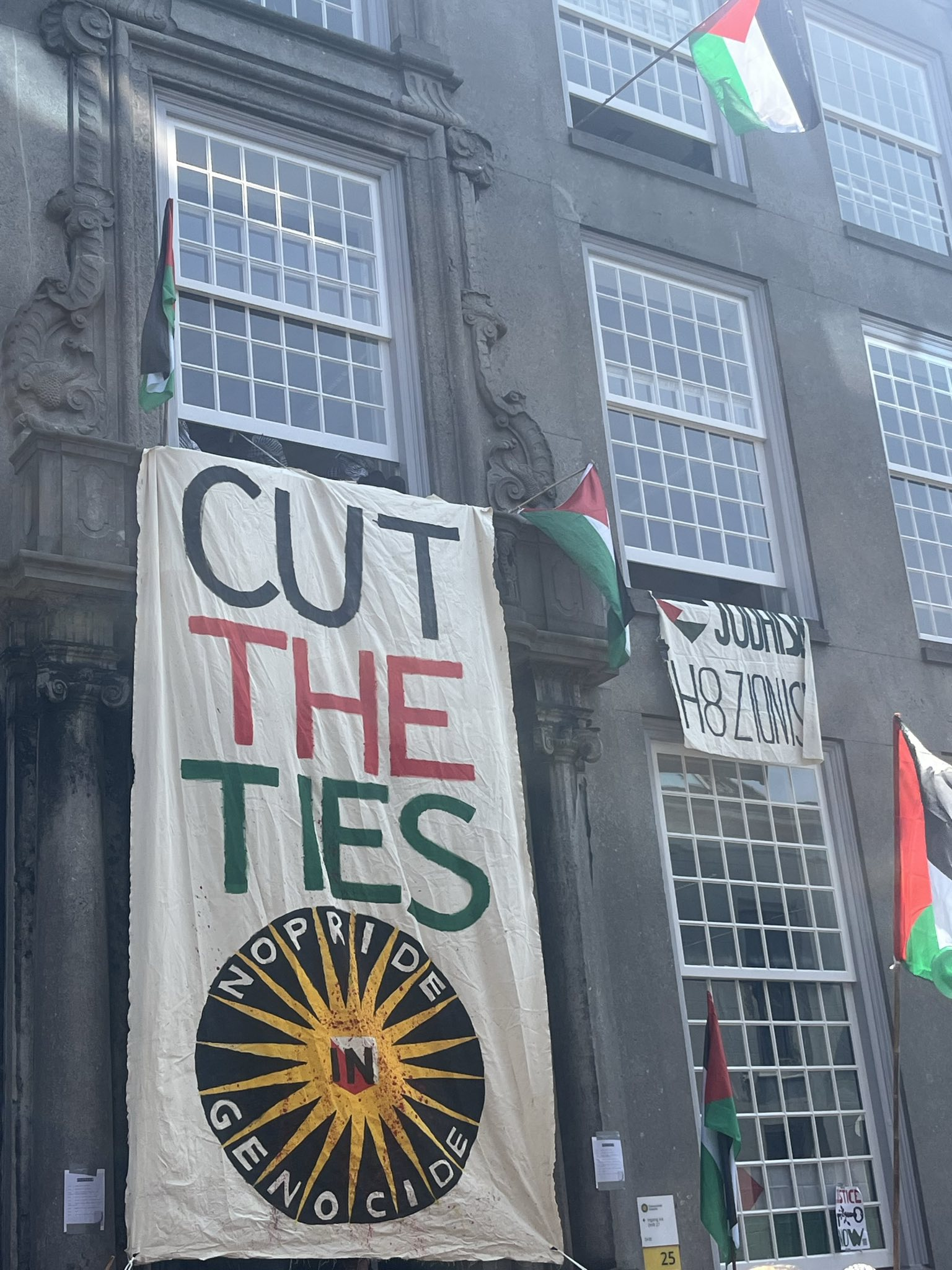
Banners hanging from the university building Drift 25 with messages "Cut the ties, no pride in genocide", "<3 (love) Judaism, H8 (hate) Zionism", and "Justice now".

On 20 March, pro-Palestinian activists chained themselves to the entrance of the administration building at Utrecht University in the Utrecht Science Park, temporarily blocking access.

On 7 May, a year after the previous attempt at a student encampment in the same location, protesters set up tents and banners in the courtyard of the university's academic library. The encampment was established as a permanent protest site and features daily teach-ins, workshops, public lectures, documentary screenings, and community discussions. The encampment was named in honor of Palestinian journalist Hossam Shabat that was killed on 24 March 2025 by an Israeli airstrike.

On 19 May, the protesters also occupied the university building Drift 13 and were met with police intervention. Police entered the premises and forcibly removed the students. Outside of the building, several protesters were also hit with police violence, with some sustaining injuries. The riot police arrested 49 individuals for trespassing and transported them by bus to another location in Utrecht, with most being released later that night. The police action was criticized by several staff groups within the university and by the mayor of Utrecht.

On 3 June, protesters peacefully occupied another university building Janskerkhof 15a, citing insufficient action from the university. No lectures were disrupted. After an overnight stay, police and the Executive Board issued a final eviction warning, prompting the activists to leave the building peacefully and voluntarily.

On 18 June, activists in Utrecht blocked parts of Drift street and occupied the university building Drift 25, leading to the closure of the University Library and nearby buildings. The occupation lasted until 20 June, when police entered via a crawlspace only to find the building already completely empty.

On 30 September, about a dozen of activists re-occupied the Drift 25 building demanding a full boycott of Israeli institutions, which the university has so far refused to do. The occupation lasted until 2 October with protesters disbanding on their own.

On 2 December, the building was re-occupied by about 20 activists. The protesters called the building after Dr. Hussam Abu Safiya, a Palestinian doctor and director of the Kamal Adwan Hospital in Gaza that was kidnapped by the Israeli army. University activities in the building have been canceled or moved to other locations. The occupation is ongoing.

=== Vrije Universiteit Amsterdam ===
On 9 April, demonstrators occupied the BelleVUe building at Vrije Universiteit Amsterdam (VU), disrupting classes and prompting a police response. The occupation, organized by the student group VUforPalestine, demanded transparency regarding the university’s ties to Israeli institutions. The protest ended later that evening when police arrested seven demonstrators for trespassing. In a statement, VU acknowledged the protesters' concerns about the situation in Gaza but emphasized that building occupations are not permitted, despite supporting freedom of expression and the right to protest.

On 3 June, a pro-Palestinian protest at VU, including a tent camp named after Palestinian academic Khalil Abu Yahia, was set-up calling on the university to cut ties with Israeli institutions. The protest, facilitated by the university with amenities like a portable toilet, was peaceful and dialogue-focused, involving lectures, cultural activities, and staff solidarity sit-ins. Demonstrators criticized the VU's vague public statements, accusing it of complicity in genocide and selective support for political protests. The encampment lasted until 11 June, when riot police dismantled the encampment and several protesters were arrested. The police admitted to using violence in the process.

=== University of Amsterdam ===
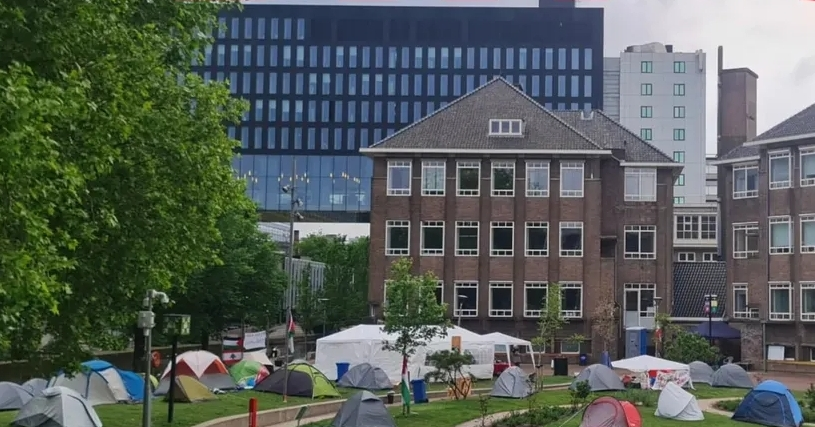
Pro-Palestine and anti-genocide encampment on the campus of the University of Amsterdam in June 2025.

On 14 April, dozens of pro-Palestinian activists occupied the Maagdenhuis, the main administration building of the University of Amsterdam. Staff were ordered to leave, entrances were barricaded, and banners and Palestinian flags were displayed from the windows. The occupiers demanded the immediate severance of all ties with Israeli institutions. The university refused to negotiate with masked occupiers and filed a police report. The protests ended with police intervention.

On 2 June, demonstrators re-established a protest encampment on the Roeterseiland campus, demanding the university sever all ties with Israeli institutions and companies alleged to be complicit in genocide in Gaza. The protest follows similar actions earlier in May and has drawn over 50 participants. Demonstrators renamed the campus "Alaa al-Najjar campus" in memory of a Gazan doctor who lost most of her family in an Israeli airstrike. UvA advisory councils had recently urged the suspension of collaborations with Israeli academic institutions. While UvA rector Peter-Paul Verbeek acknowledged for the first time the presence of genocidal violence in Gaza, he has yet to adopt the councils’ recommendations. The encampment and protests lasted until 20 June, when the protesters disbanded on their own.

=== Delft University of Technology ===
On 22 April 400 TU Delft full professors received information packages as part of a grassroots initiative to raise awareness about the role of the university in the ongoing alleged genocide, possible actions, and pathways to change. Organized by the Delft Student Intifada, TU Delft staff, students, and allies, the packages included Maya Wind’s book Towers of Ivory and Steel and custom flyers. Institutions like TU Delft work on dual-use technologies with companies like Israel Aerospace Industries.

On 5 June, over a hundred pro-Palestinian protesters peacefully occupied the TU Delft Library. The demonstration began near the Pulse building and proceeded across campus with chants like "Free, free Palestine". Later, the group entered the library and unfurled a banner criticizing TU Delft's ties with the Israel military complex. The protest remained peaceful, with no police or security intervention.

On 3 December, a group of activists occupied the roof of the Mechanical Engineering building of TU Delft while about a hundred showed support on campus. Protesters called the building as Abu Assi Building after two brothers, aged 8 and 11, who were killed by an Israeli drone strike. They claimed the university made "false promises" regarding cutting off partnerships with Israel. Ended when riot police intervened and arrested six protesters. The Executive Board did not show up to talk with the activists but announced that it would end a partnership with an Israeli company.

=== Leiden University ===
On 6 May, a demonstration at the Leiden University Wijnhaven building in The Hague escalated when a small group of protesters barricaded themselves inside, prompting police intervention. While most demonstrators left peacefully, those who refused were arrested after attempting to flee through emergency exits. The university cited safety concerns, property damage, and disruption to teaching as reasons for involving law enforcement. Reports indicated that over 70 people were arrested and several protesters were injured. The university has established a committee to review collaborations with Israeli institutions.

On 26 November, a group of around 50 activists occupied the Academy Building in protest of the university's continued collaboration with Israeli institutions. Activists stated that they chose the date because the Cleveringa inaugural lecture by French-American political scientist Hélène Landemore was being held in the occupied building, which they renamed as "Dr. Suleiman Haboush University" in reference to a Palestinian historian killed in Gaza in October 2023. The group claimed to be acting in the spirit of Cleveringa by protesting institutional collaboration with Israeli partners. The lecture was moved to a different building. The occupation ended at night after police intervention and the activists were arrested.

=== Radboud University Nijmegen ===
On 7 May, at Radboud University, activists briefly occupied the Berchmanianum building. A university representative refused to negotiate with the protesters. Police operations at the campus led to three arrests, with some incidents involving the use of batons and police dogs, leading to a protester sustaining injuries from a bite of a police dog.

On 13 May, demonstrators re-established an encampment near the Huygens building on campus, which lasted uninterrupted until 1 June.

=== Erasmus University Rotterdam ===
On 13 May, activists set up a protest camp on Erasmus Plaza of the Erasmus University Rotterdam. Despite university rules prohibiting overnight stays, they were tolerated due to good communication with the university. The protest targets cuts, ties with Israeli institutions, and the fossil fuel industry. A university spokesperson affirmed that demonstrations are allowed as long as they remain peaceful and do not disrupt education, research, or safety.

=== Maastricht University ===
On 25 May, a student group at Maastricht University blocked entrances to multiple university faculties in protest of the institution’s ties to Israeli universities. Protesters demanded that the university cut academic partnerships, particularly with the Hebrew University of Jerusalem, citing its alleged role in normalizing Israeli policies toward Palestinians. The university building blockades lasted several hours and remained peaceful, despite some confrontations. Later in the week, the group organized additional walkouts.

=== Eindhoven University of Technology ===
On 4 June, activists spray-painted the exterior of Atlas, the main building of Eindhoven University of Technology, in protest against the university’s alleged complicity in the war in Gaza. The group stated the action was a response to the university’s failure to address their concerns through dialogue. Central to the activists’ criticism is the involvement of the university in the EU-funded Horizon Europe research program, which includes Israeli partners. Although the board emphasizes that Horizon Europe excludes military projects, the activists argue that the research indirectly supports Israeli military applications.

=== Utrecht School of Arts ===
On 12 June, demonstrators from the group HKU4Palestine occupied a building of the Utrecht School of the Arts (HKU) for several hours to protest the institution's perceived ties to Israel. The protesters demanded that HKU cut any connections with Israeli institutions, particularly the Bezalel Academy of Art and Design in Jerusalem, and called for transparency and a public stance against what they called the ongoing genocide. HKU stated it has no institutional links with Israeli organizations and plans to use an ethical framework to evaluate future partnerships. After being ordered to leave, the protesters peacefully exited the building. This marked the first such protest at a Dutch art school, following similar university occupations.

=== Wageningen University & Research ===
On 19 June, the activist group Wageningen for Palestine organized a blockade of the Atlas building at Wageningen University, which houses the university's executive board. The protest was part of a broader student-led movement across Dutch universities calling for an end to institutional ties with Israeli academic institutions. Citing the university’s participation in collaborations with Israeli partners, the demonstrators expressed deep shame and moral outrage over the situation in Gaza. The protest remained peaceful, with activists emphasizing they did not wish to obstruct others but felt compelled to act. Wageningen University acknowledged the emotional motivations behind the protest but criticized the chosen method and location. The university announced it was considering filing a formal complaint in response to the blockade.

=== University of Twente ===
On 1 September, the speech by Prime Minister Dick Schoof at the opening ceremony of the academic year at the University of Twente was disrupted twice. The protesters were removed by security.

== Reactions ==
On 14 March, the University of Amsterdam announced it would indefinitely suspend student exchange programmes with the Hebrew University of Jerusalem, following recommendations from a university-appointed committee on "sensitive partnerships". The decision was based on concerns over the university's ties to the Israeli military and its failure to distance itself from alleged human rights violations in Gaza. Israeli students already in Amsterdam may complete their studies, but new exchanges are halted.

On 8 May, Tilburg University announced it had suspended institutional ties with Bar-Ilan and Reichman universities in Israel, citing their close links to the Israeli military. The decision followed a recommendation by a university-appointed commission of four professors. Attempts to initiate dialogue with the two institutions were unsuccessful, according to the university. Talks with the Hebrew University of Jerusalem are ongoing, as Tilburg noted the importance of engaging with critical voices within Israeli society.

On 16 May, Utrecht University announced it would end a research collaboration with the Israeli Ministry of Health and permanently halt its student exchange programme with the University of Haifa. While most existing collaborations will continue, the university stated it will not establish new ties with Israeli institutions for the time being. A committee will be formed to develop an ethical framework for partnerships involving countries engaged in armed conflict or human rights violations. The university also condemned Israeli actions in Gaza, citing "genocidal violence" and ongoing blockades.

On 22 May, Radboud University in Nijmegen announced it would end its institutional cooperation with Tel Aviv University and the Hebrew University. The decision followed the ongoing protests in its campus and a commission’s finding that Israel’s human rights violations in Palestine are "serious and systematic", and that those universities contribute to some of these violations.

On 5 June, Erasmus University Rotterdam announced the freezing of its collaborations with three Israeli universities – Bar-Ilan University, Hebrew University of Jerusalem, and University of Haifa – due to concerns over potential involvement in human rights violations. Exchange programs and new research partnerships are halted, though individual academic contacts remain allowed. The decision follows a critical report from an independent advisory committee citing military ties and controversial research activities in occupied Palestinian territories.

On 10 June, TU Delft announced the immediate suspension of new institutional collaborations with Israeli universities and organizations due to concerns over potential involvement in human rights violations in Gaza, while existing partnerships will undergo reassessment based on criteria set by an internal Moral Deliberation Chamber. After the protests on 3 December, the university announced it would break a partnership with an Israeli company, reconsider another, and cancel three other planned projects.

On 17 June, Eindhoven University of Technology announced it would freeze all institutional collaborations with Israeli universities, citing the ongoing humanitarian crisis in Gaza and concerns over ties to the Israeli defense sector. The decision specifically includes suspending cooperation with Technion, an Israeli university known for its close connections to military research. The university also plans to establish a committee to review sensitive collaborations, reflecting growing concerns over the dual-use potential of civilian technologies in military contexts. President Koen Janssen stated that continued cooperation under current conditions risks moral complicity in human rights violations.

On 30 June, Vrije Universiteit Amsterdam (VU) announced it will no longer collaborate with central or regional governments of countries credibly accused of gross human rights violations. The decision follows the adoption of a new assessment framework addressing the risks of international partnerships in the context of armed conflict and human rights abuses. VU has begun terminating a specific research project involving the Israeli government, citing its new ethical guidelines, but all other collaborations with Israeli institutions are set to remain in place.

== See also ==
- List of pro-Palestinian protests in the Netherlands
- 2024 pro-Palestinian protests on university campuses in the Netherlands
- 2025 pro-Palestinian protests on university campuses
- Israel–Hamas war protests
- Academic boycott of Israel
- Boycott, Divestment, and Sanctions
