= Australia–South Africa relations =

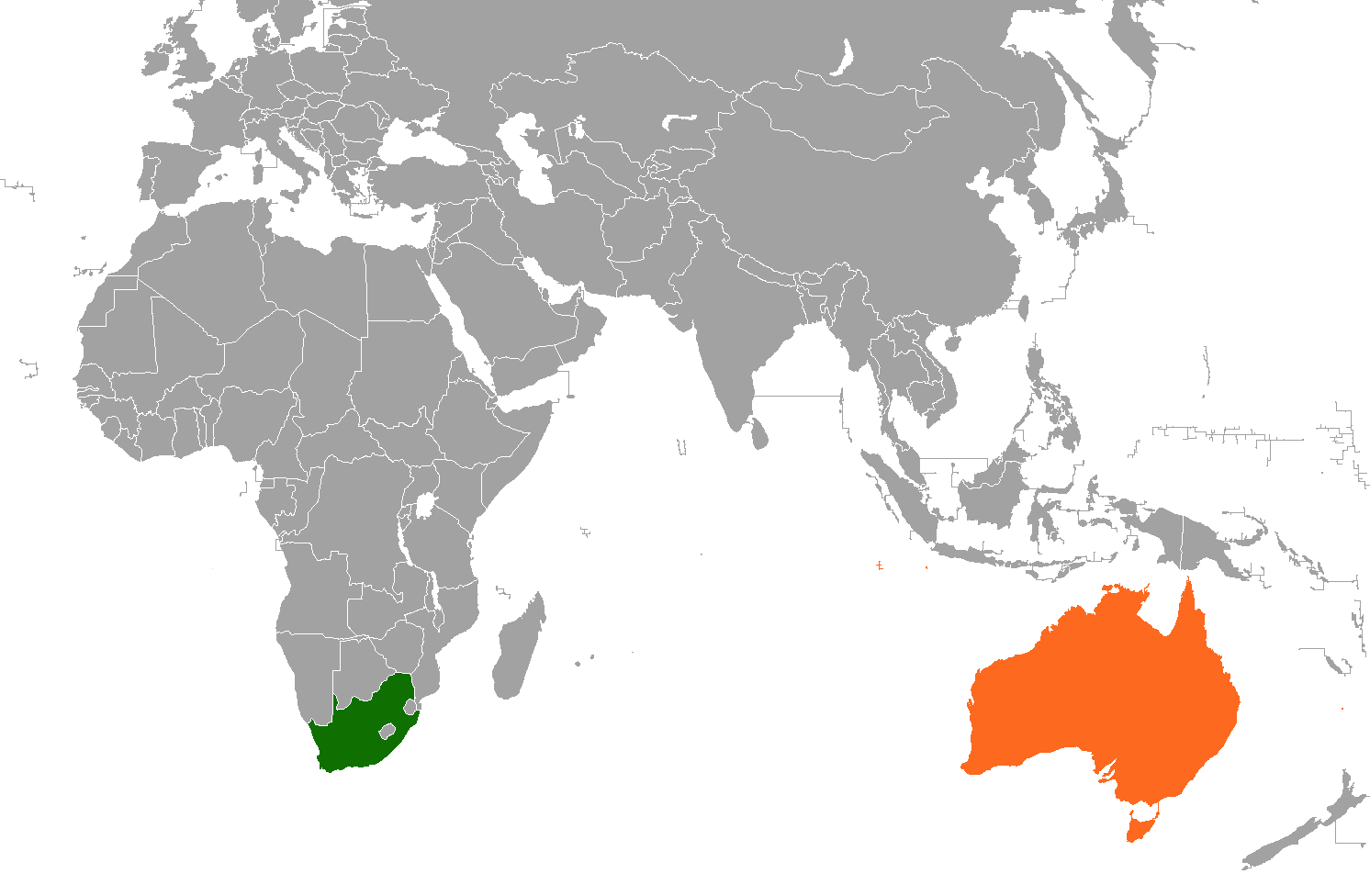

- South Africa: Australia

Australia–South Africa relations are the historical and bilateral ties between the Commonwealth of Australia and the Republic of South Africa that formally established diplomatic relations in 1947. Australia is home to one of the largest South African communities abroad with approximately 189,230 South Africans living in the country. Both countries are members of the Cairns Group, Commonwealth of Nations, G20, Indian Ocean Rim Association and the United Nations.

== History ==
Union of South Africa-Australia relations
- South Africa: Australia

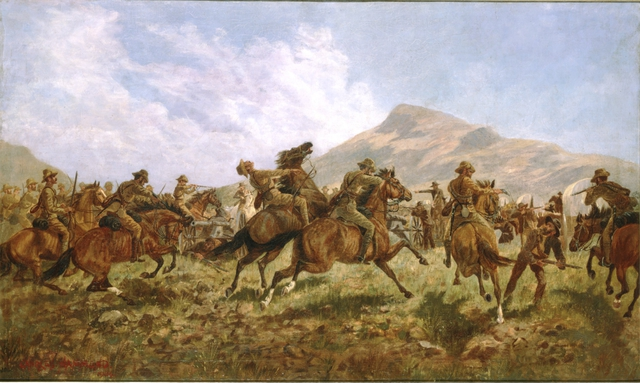
Australian and New Zealand soldiers at Klerksdorp during the Second Boer War; 1901.

Both nations are historically linked through the British Empire. Between 1899 and 1902, Australia contributed over 16,000 soldiers to fight alongside the British during the Second Boer War to fight against primarily Afrikaans-speaking settlers of the Transvaal Republic and Orange Free State. Over 500 Australians died in the war.

During World War I and World War II; soldiers from both Australia and South Africa fought alongside each other in Europe and North Africa and the Pacific. South Africa obtained its independence from Great Britain in 1910 while Australia obtained its independence in 1901.

Since 1947, both countries enjoyed very close political and economic ties. In 1948, South Africa adopted the policy of apartheid. As campaigns for international isolation of South Africa intensified in the 1970s and 1980s, successive Australian governments placed Australia firmly in the anti-apartheid camp. Thus supporting United Nations resolutions against apartheid and implementing oil, trade and arms embargo against South Africa.

When Australian Prime Minister Gough Whitlam came to power in December 1972, his Government quickly acted to dismantle all vestiges of racism and to adopt a more independent stance on foreign policy. One of its first actions was to restrict the entry of racially selected sports teams and individuals and initiate an apartheid sports boycott. In 1977, Prime Minister Malcolm Fraser was instrumental and played a key role in Gleneagles Agreement imposing sanctions on sporting ties with South Africa.

In 1987, former Australian Prime Minister Malcolm Fraser, in his role as the head of the Commonwealth Eminent Persons Group campaigning against apartheid, visited Nelson Mandela in prison. In February 1990, Mandela was released from prison and in October 1990, Mandela, as President of the African National Congress; paid a visit to Australia. During his visit to Australia, Mandela however did not bring up the plight of Aboriginal Australians stating that he did not wish to "interfere" in the internal politics of another country.

After the inauguration of the first democratically elected Government of South Africa in May 1994, relations between both nations were normalized. In 1997, the Australia-South Africa Joint Ministerial Commission (JMC) was established which is chaired by Trade Ministers. The JMC is the peak forum for the discussion and strengthening of the trade and economic relationship between both nations.

In the early 2000s, Australia's trade with South Africa had become more liberalized and they also played a significant role along with India in the Indian Ocean Rim Association for Regional Cooperation.

=== 2018 diplomatic disputes ===
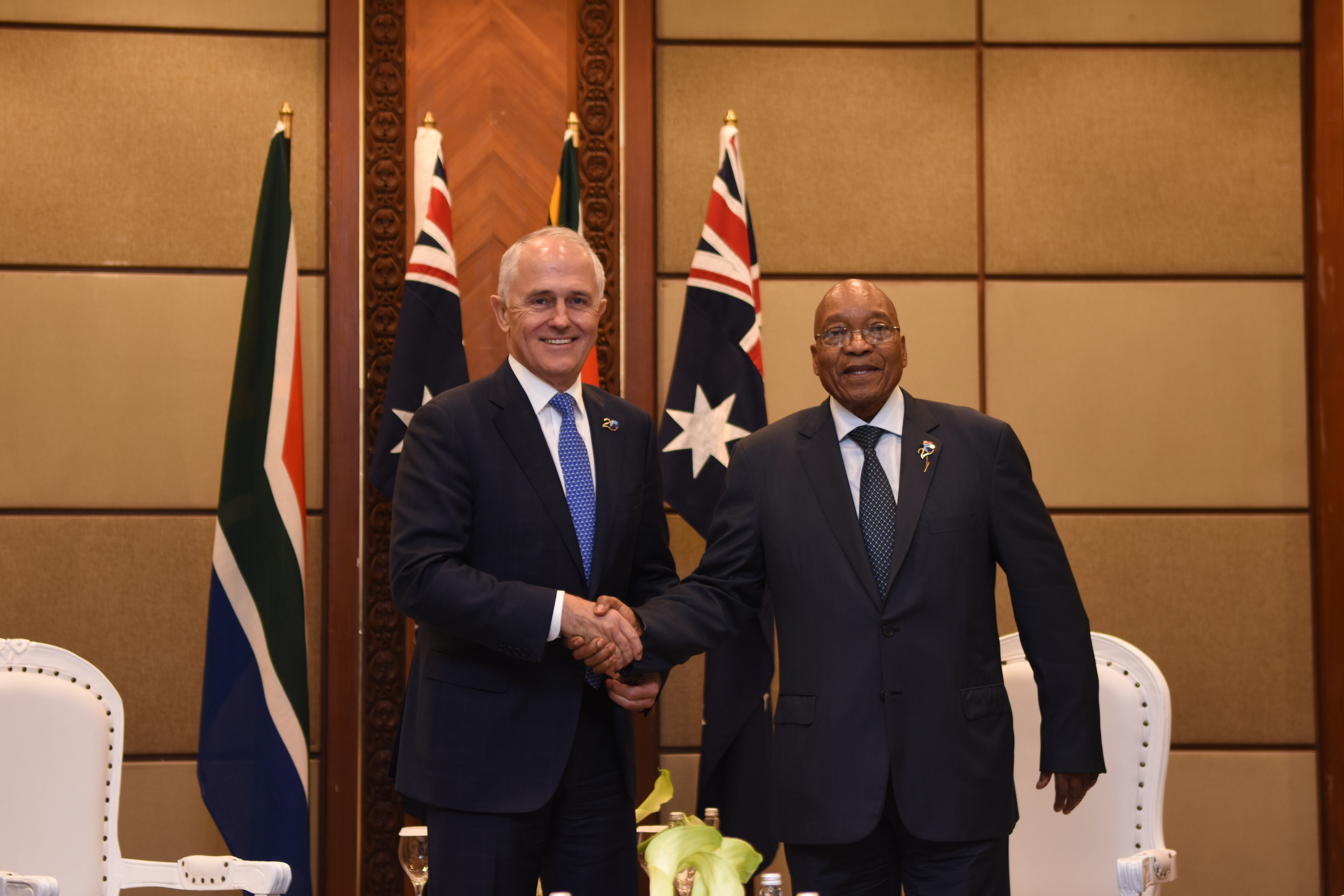
Australian Prime Minister Malcolm Turnbull and South African President Jacob Zuma in 2017.

In March 2018, a diplomatic row broke out between the two countries after Australian cabinet minister Peter Dutton called for white South African farmers to be fast-tracked as refugees, stating that "they need help from a civilised country", with the Australian High Commissioner subsequently summoned by the South African foreign ministry, which expressed its offence at Dutton's statements, and demanded a “full retraction”. The Australian government effectively retracted Dutton's offer, and responded to the South African démarche with a letter that "satisfied" the South African foreign ministry. However, Dutton subsequently reiterated his position that the farmers were persecuted, denied any retraction, and insisted that the Australian government was looking at "several" individual cases of farmers that could qualify for humanitarian visas. In April 2018, Attorney-General for Australia Christian Porter also offered assistance to South Africans facing "persecution".

In April 2018, the South African government issued a statement that it took "strong exception" to an Australian travel advisory that warned persons travelling to South Africa to "exercise a high degree of caution", with the South African foreign ministry stating that it would deter Australians from visiting, as well as tarnishing the image of South Africa. According to the South African foreign ministry, previous attempts to get the advice changed were unsuccessful, and the escalation reflected the importance of the tourist sector to the economy.

== Trade ==
Monthly value of Australian merchandise exports to South Africa (A$ millions) since 1988

Monthly value of South African merchandise exports to Australia (A$ millions) since 1988

In 2017, two-way trade between both nations was valued at A$3.6 billion. Australian exports to South Africa totaled A$2 billion, mainly consisting of aluminum ores, minerals and machinery. South African exports to Australia totaled A$1.8 billion and consisting of passenger motor vehicles, other ores & concentrates, machinery and parts, and pig-iron. Australia is South Africa's 15th largest export destination. South Africa is Australia's 24th largest export destination.

== South African migration to Australia ==
In June 2019, Australia was home to approximately 193,860 South African born population living in the country, making it one of the largest South African diaspora community abroad. Many primarily White South Africans migrated to Australia from 1994 to date.

== Sporting relations ==
Australia played a consistent role in the implementation of the apartheid sports boycott from 1972 to 1991, when there were no official Australian rugby or cricket tours. However, there were many unofficial tours of South Africa, such as the rebel cricket tours in 1985–86 and 1986–87.

Australia and South Africa have a strong sporting rivalry particularly in rugby union and cricket. Through the annual The Rugby Championship rugby union competition, Australia and South Africa compete for the Mandela Challenge Plate.

== Transportation ==
There are direct flights between both nations with Qantas and South African Airways.

== Resident diplomatic missions ==
of Australia in South Africa

- Pretoria (High Commission)

of South Africa in Australia

- Canberra (High Commission)

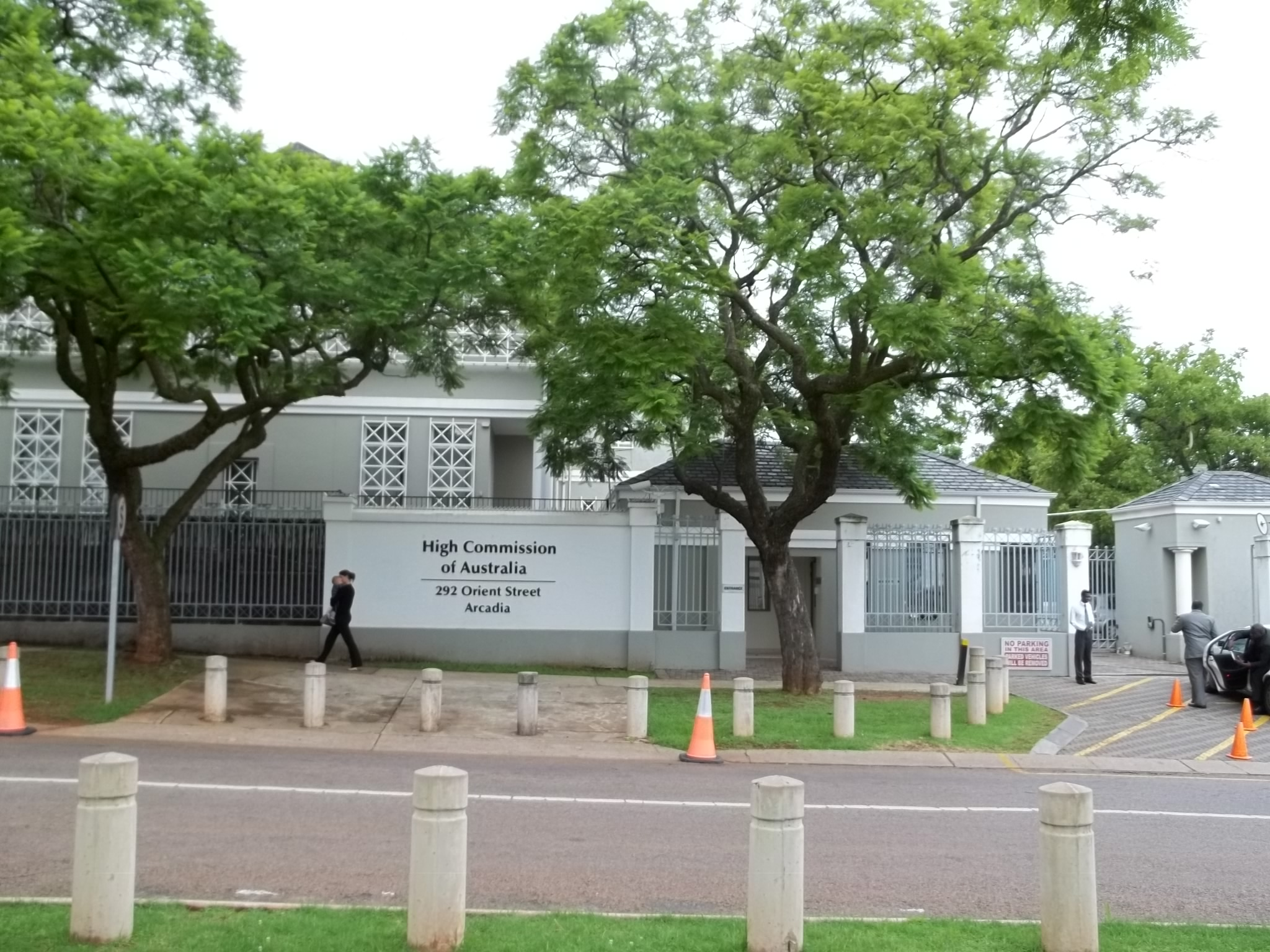
Australian High Commission in Pretoria

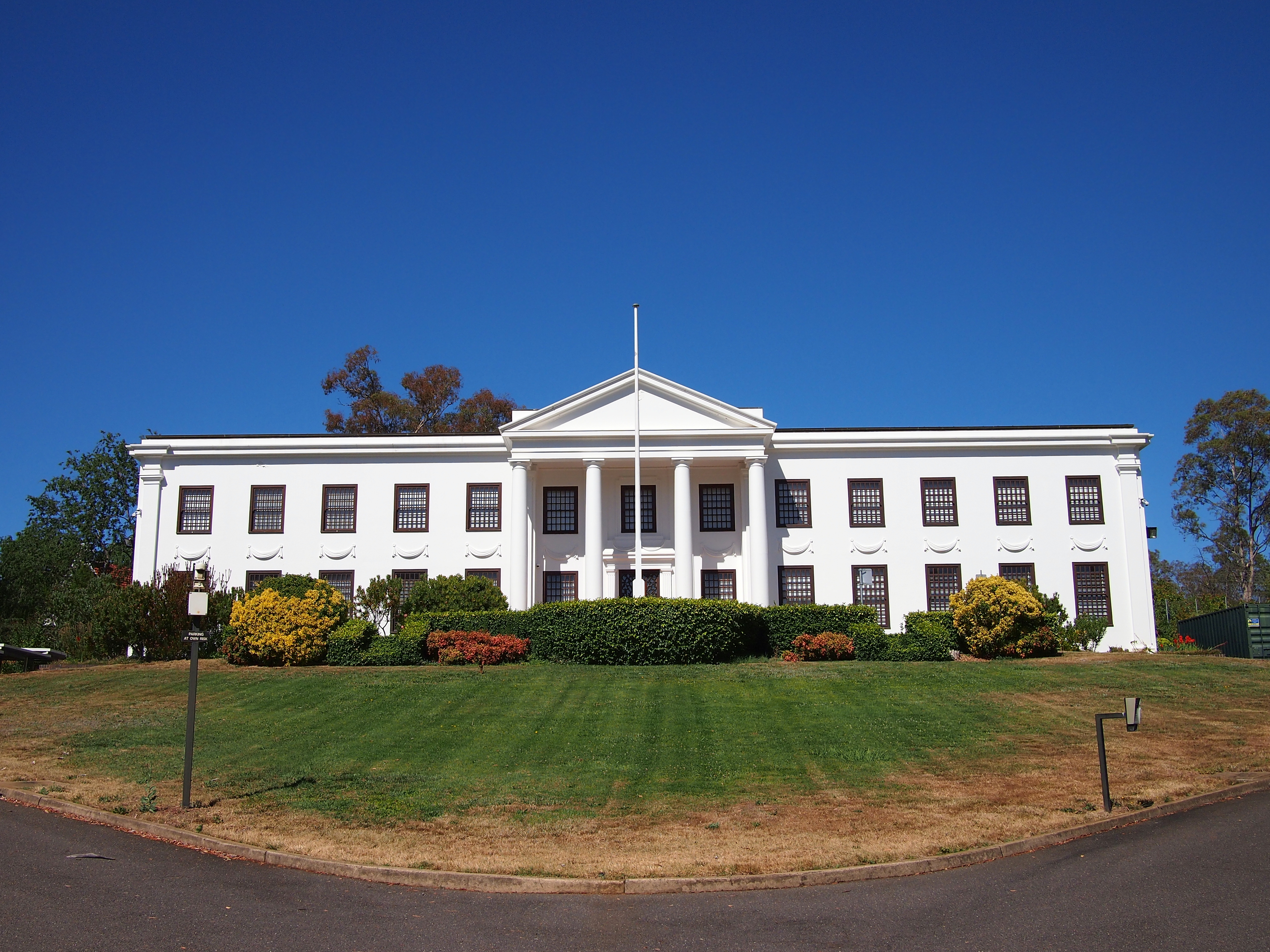
South African High Commission in Canberra

== See also ==
- Military history of Australia during the Second Boer War
