= 2024 Utrecht University pro-Palestinian campus occupations =

2024 student protests at Utrecht University

2024 Utrecht University pro-Palestinian campus occupation
- Part of Gaza war protests (at universities (in 2024 (in the Netherlands)))
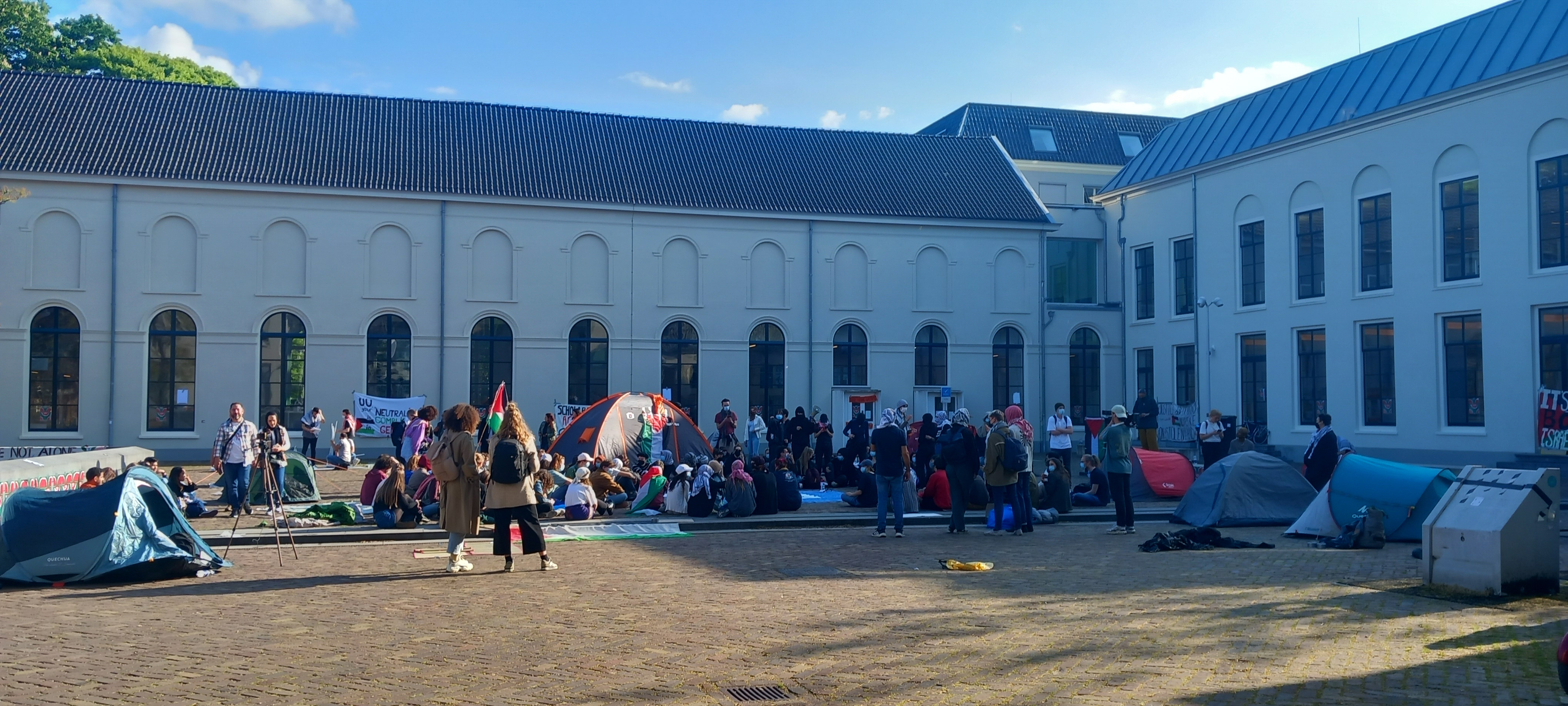
- View of the encampment, 7 May 2024.
- Date: 7–9 May 2024
- Location: Utrecht University, Netherlands
- Caused by: Institutional ties with Israeli universities and companies
- Goals: Severing of academic and financial ties with Israeli institutions, recognition of the Palestinian genocide
- Methods: Encampments, protests
- Result: Protests dispersed, about 50 arrests

The 2024 student protests and campus encampments at Utrecht University were part of a wave of pro-Palestinian demonstrations across Dutch universities in May 2024. Protesters called for an end to institutional ties between their university and Israeli universities and corporations, citing the ongoing Gaza war.

== Background ==
The protests took place amid widespread global demonstrations in support of Palestinian rights and criticism of Israeli military actions in Gaza. Across the Netherlands, students began organizing encampments and protest actions similar to those seen on campuses in the United States and elsewhere in Europe.

== Protests and encampment attempt ==
On 7 May 2024, student protesters attempted to establish an encampment inside the academic library of Utrecht University. The occupation lasted into the night, but was met with a police intervention. Between 7 and 8 May, approximately 50 people were arrested during the clearing of the occupation.

Despite the arrests, demonstrators regrouped and set up a new encampment on 8 May 2024 on another part of the Utrecht University campus. This second encampment was removed by police in the early hours of 9 May. During this operation, three protesters outside the building who were not part of the occupation were also arrested.

== Reactions ==
The events sparked debate over police involvement in university protests, freedom of expression on campus, and the role of academic institutions in international conflicts. Human rights organizations and student unions expressed concern over the scale of arrests in Utrecht, while Anton Pijpers, President of the Executive Board of Utrecht University, defended the police response as necessary for public safety.

== See also ==
- Student activism
- Academic boycotts of Israel
- Boycott, Divestment and Sanctions
- 2025 Utrecht University pro-Palestinian campus occupations
- List of pro-Palestinian protests in the Netherlands
