= Settler society =

Colonial society intending to permanently settle in a foreign area

Settler society is a society founded after the conquest of another society. It is a theoretical term in the early modern period and modern history that describes a common link between modern, predominantly European, attempts to permanently settle in other areas of the world. It is used to distinguish settler colonies from resource extraction colonies. The term came to wide use in the 1970s as part of the discourse on decolonization, particularly to describe older colonial units. White settler societies established by European powers in the Americas, Africa, and Australasia developed systems of white racial dominance. These societies became key places for the development of racist theories and practices, even producing their own theorists like Samuel George Morton in the United States, who argued for the separate species of Black people. Experiences of colonization in Australia, including efforts to "civilize" Aboriginal people, also contributed to the development of polygenism theories, which posited separate origins for different human "races."

== History and examples ==
One of the earliest examples of settler society was the Kingdom of Jerusalem, which was established by Crusaders and lasted for almost 200 years. It constituted a localized feudal hierarchy established by the Franks, who ruled and exploited the territory according to their political and economic interests. The European colonization of the Americas resulted in the establishment of several settler societies, while Australia was also established as a series of settler societies by European settlers during the colonization of Australia during the 19th century.

== Province of men ==
As a traditional model of comparative analysis, it has been described as the means by which white male settlers "heroically" conquered a land and established democracies of one sort or another. This particular conceptualization has been criticized for ignoring issues such as race, ethnicity, and gender. However, it is noted that while the concept of settler society is structured along traditional gender lines, female settlers enjoyed favorable competitive position in comparison to their counterparts in the metropole. For instance, a colonial administrator's wife or a female teacher was able to attain wider social recognition in settler societies.

== Bibliography ==
- Attwood, Bain. "Denial in a settler society: The Australian case." History Workshop Journal. Vol. 84. (2017).
- Denoon, Donald. Settler Capitalism: The Dynamics of Development in the Southern Hemisphere (Clarendon Press, 1983).
- Fredrickson, George M. “Colonialism and Racism.” in The Arrogance of Race: Historical Perspectives on Slavery, Racism, and Social Inequality, edited by George M. Fredrickson (Middleton, Connecticut: Wesleyan University Press, 1988) pp. 216–235.
- Kennedy, Dane. Islands of White: Settler Society and Culture in Kenya and Southern Rhodesia, 1890–1939 (Duke University Press, 1987).
- Macklin, Audrey. "From settler society to warrior nation and back again." in Citizenship in Transnational Perspective: Australia, Canada, and New Zealand (2017): 285-313. online
- Monteiro, John M. Blacks of the land: Indian slavery, settler society, and the Portuguese colonial enterprise in South America (Cambridge UP, 2018) online.
- Pearson, D. "Theorizing citizenship in British settler societies" Ethnic and Racial Studies, (2002). online
- Razack, Sherene H. Race, space, and the law: Unmapping a white settler society Toronto, Ontario: Between the Lines, 2002
- Wolfe, Patrick. “Land, Labor, and Difference: Elementary Structures of Race.” American Historical Review 2001. 106 (3): 866–905.
- Woollacott, Angela. Settler Society in the Australian Colonies: Self-government and imperial culture(Oxford UP, 2015) online.
