= List of Gaza war protests at universities in 2024 =

List of pro-Palestinian protests on university campuses in 2024
- Part of Gaza war protests (at universities)
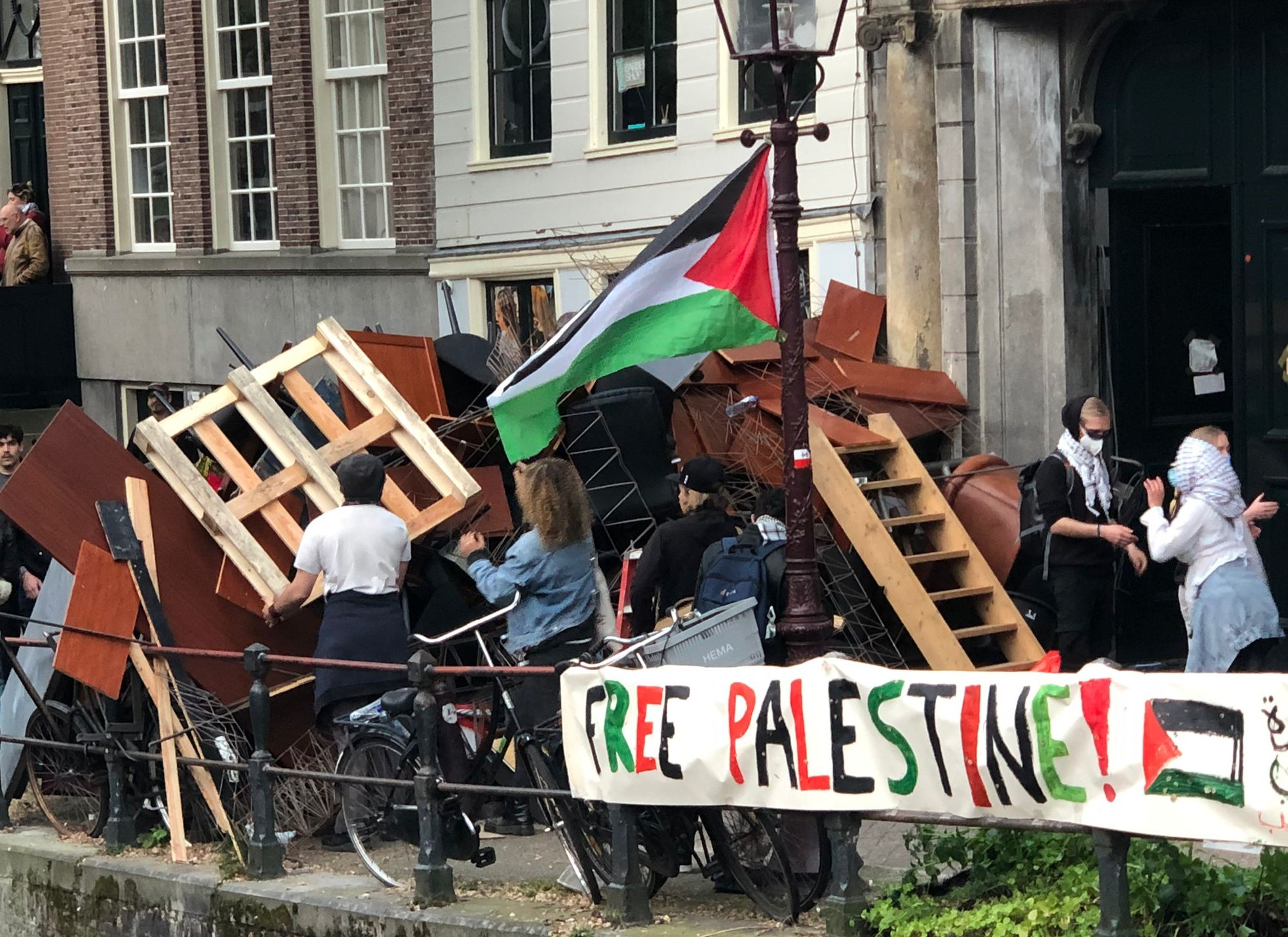
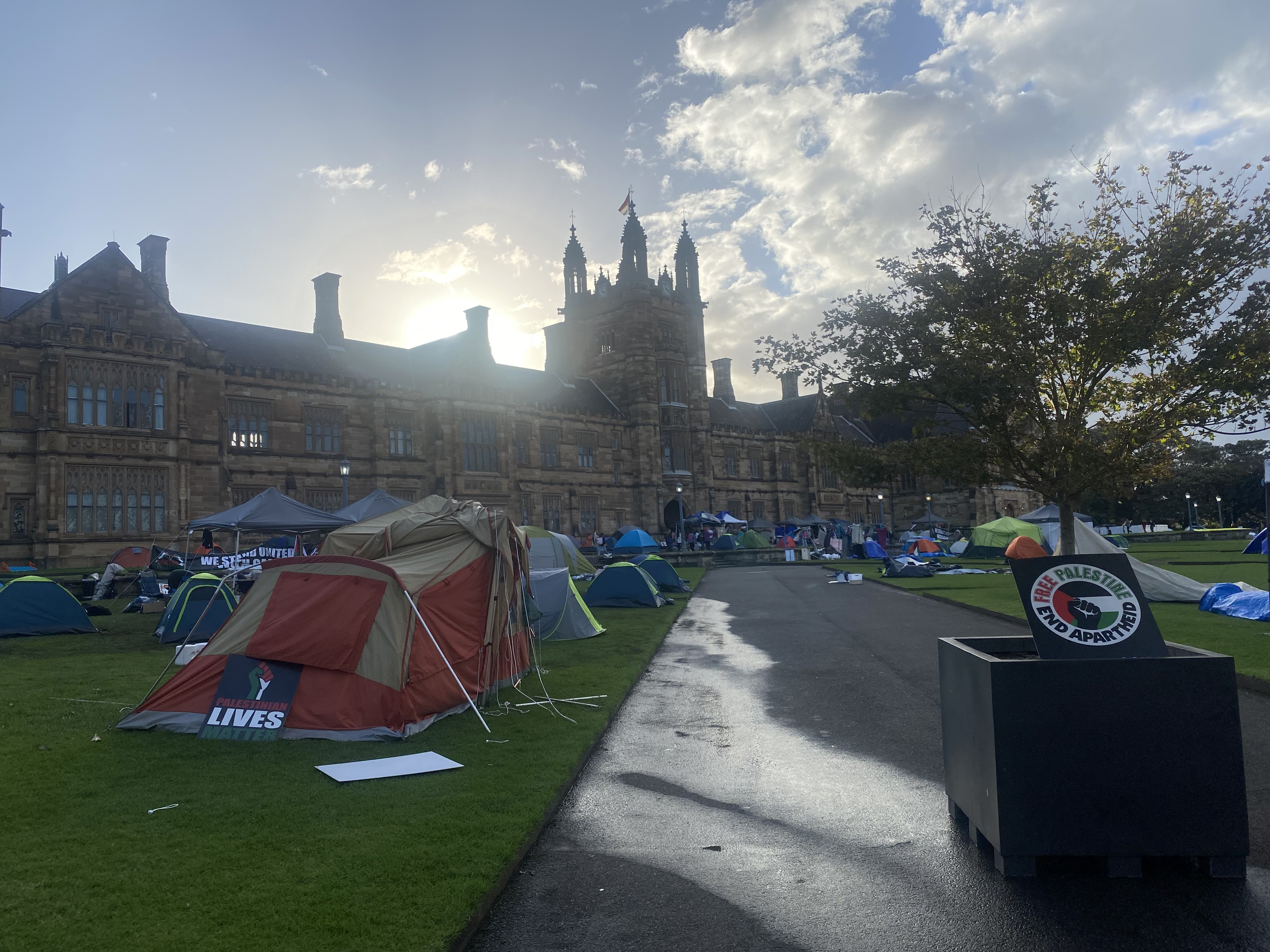
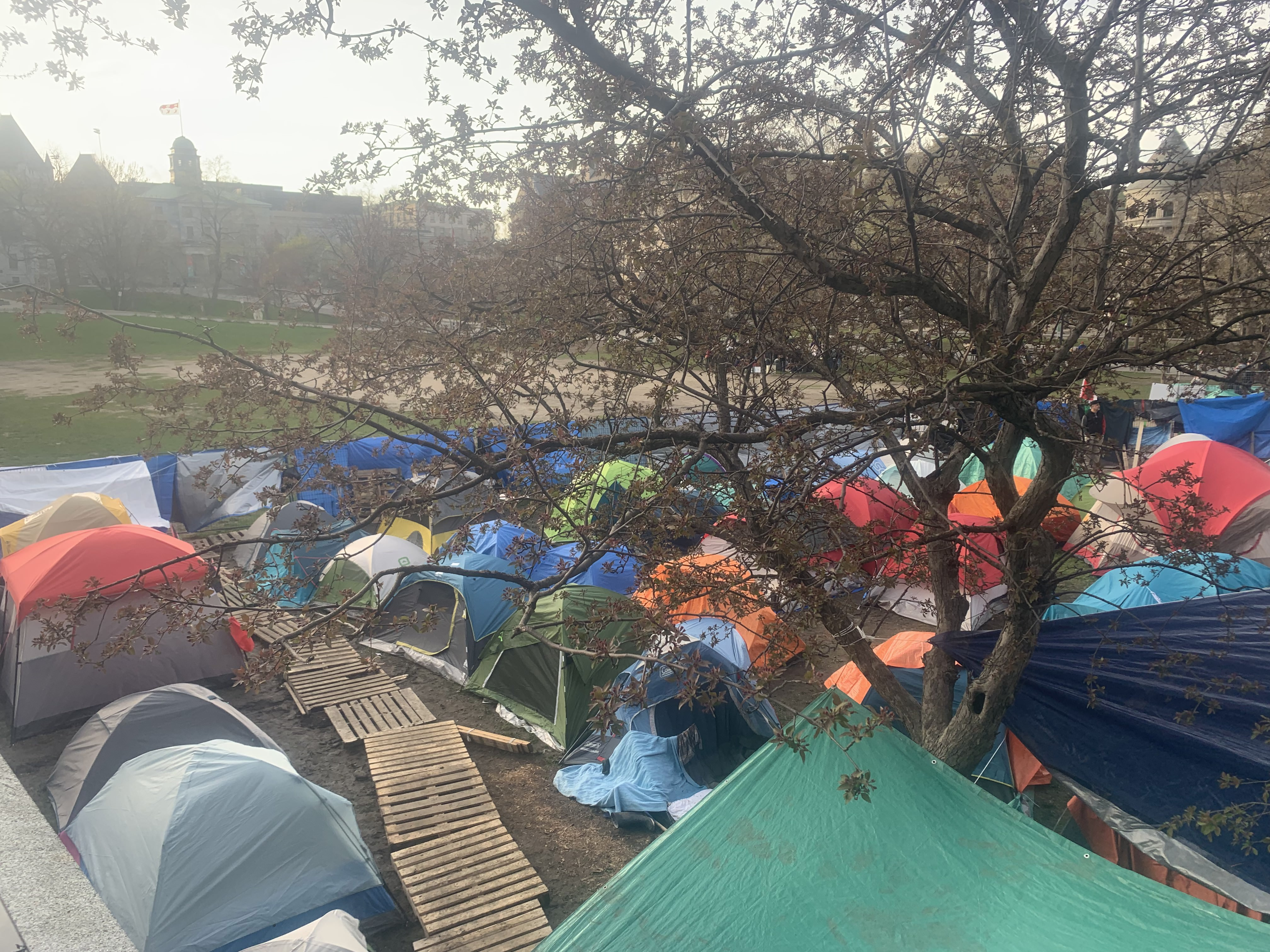
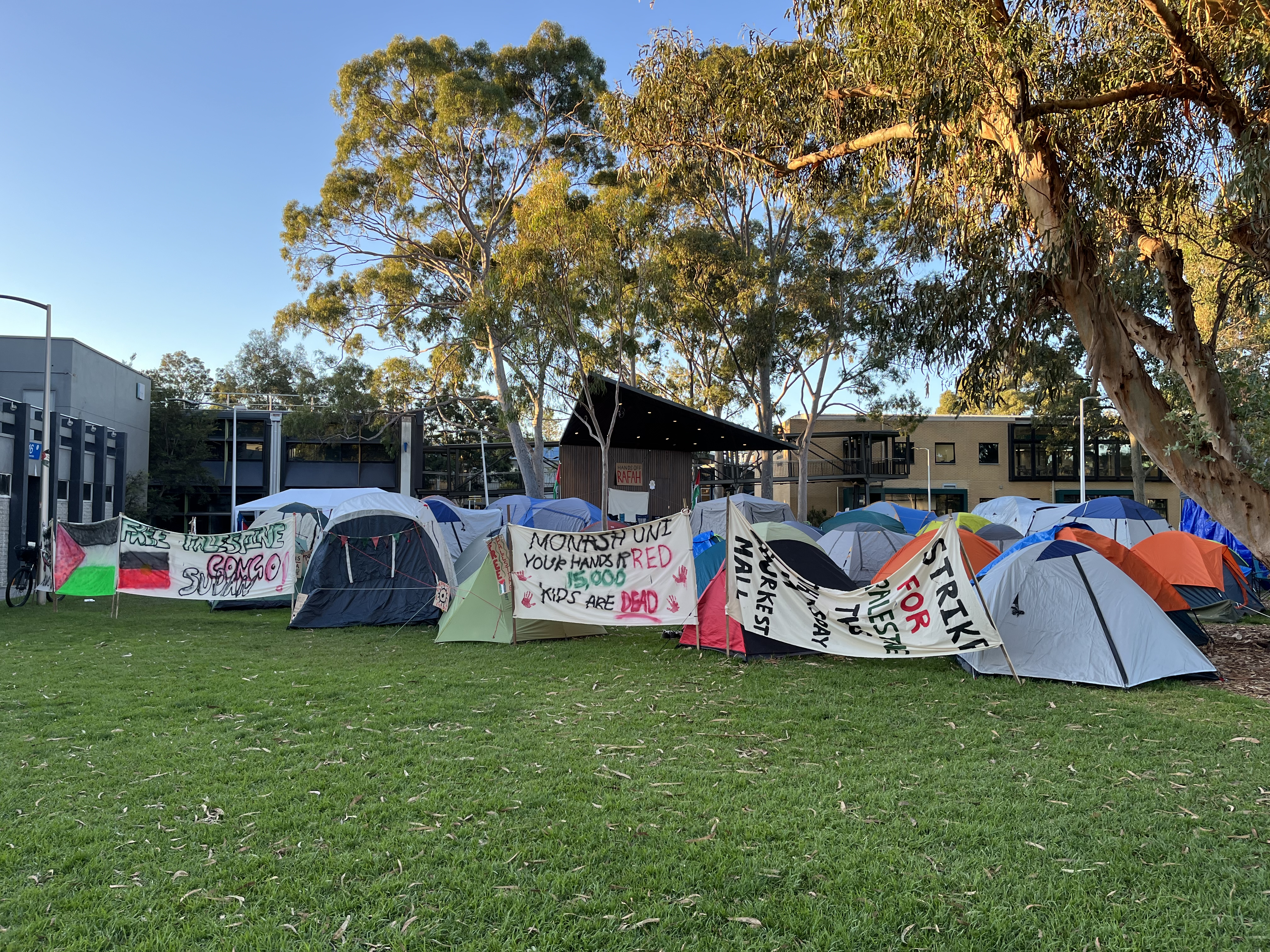
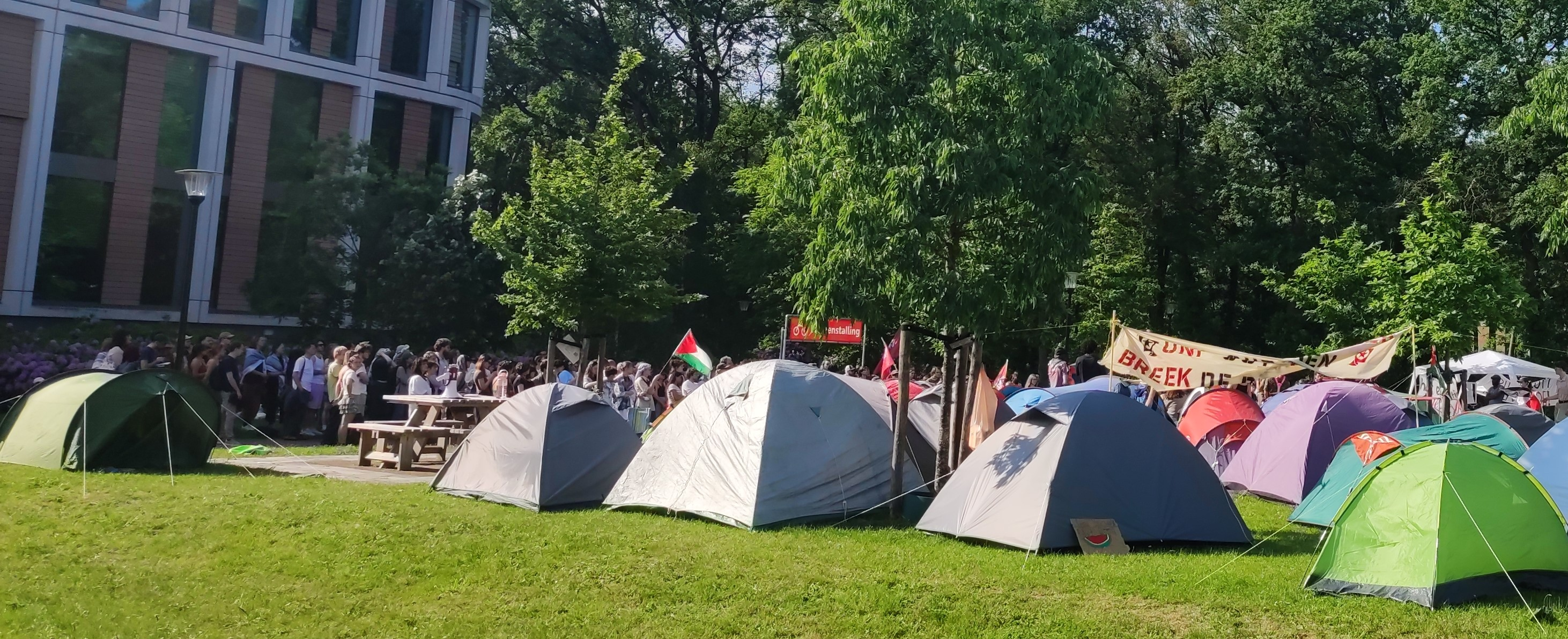
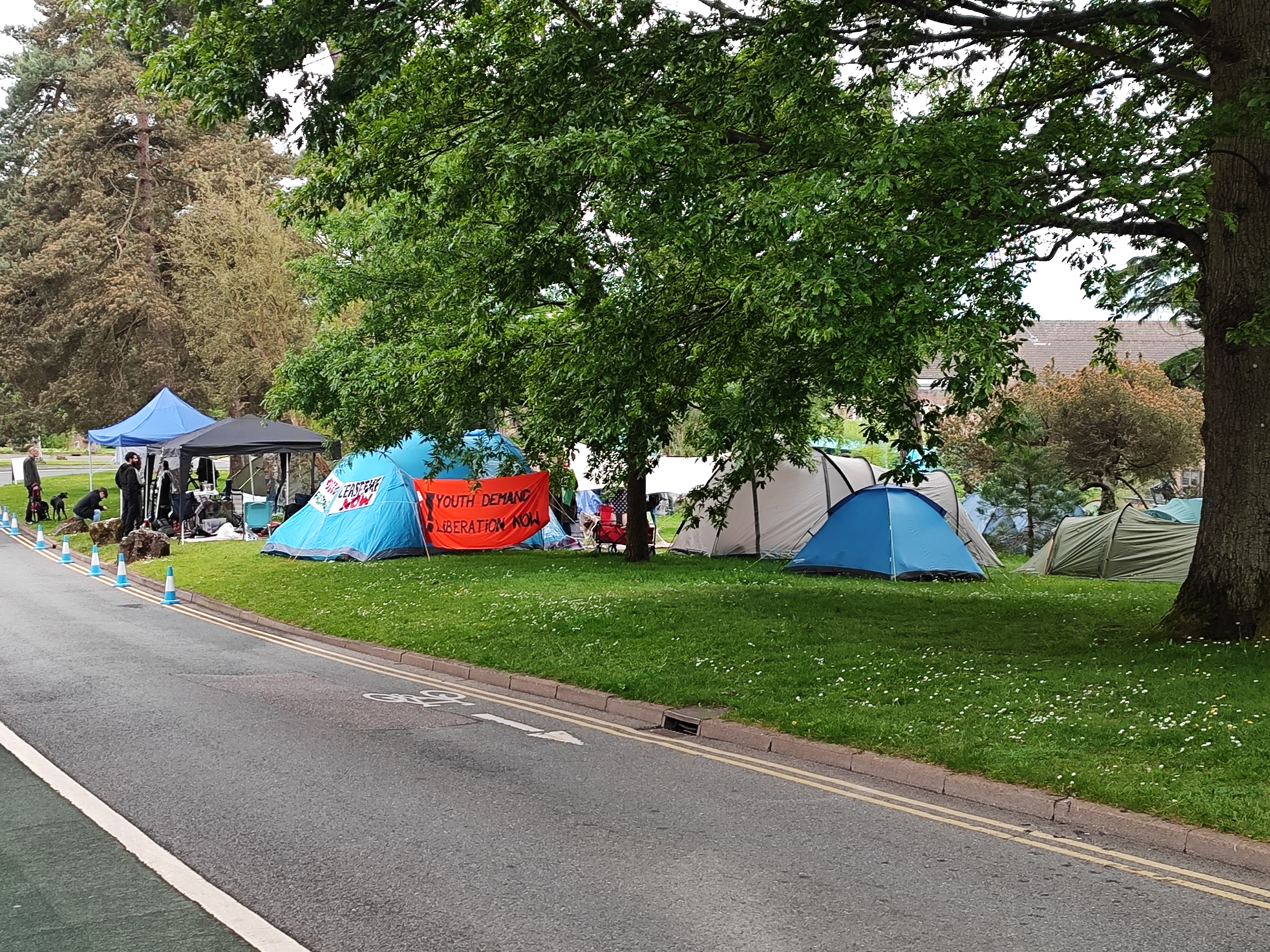
- Clockwise from top: University of Amsterdam; University of Sydney; McGill University; Monash University; Radboud University Nijmegen; University of Exeter
- Date: April 17, 2024 – July 2024 (3 months and 1 day)
- Location: Global
- Goals: Universities divestment from Israel
- Methods: Protests; Civil disobedience; Occupation; Lawsuit; Picketing; Stand-up strikes; Hunger strike; Civil disorder

This is a list of pro-Palestinian protests on university campuses in 2024 since protests escalated on April 17, beginning with the Columbia University campus occupation. As of May 6, student protests have occurred in 45 out of 50 states in the United States, and the District of Columbia, with encampments, occupations, walkouts or sit-ins on almost 140 campuses.

Encampments were established at 36 institutions in the United Kingdom, including 21 of the 24 institutions in the Russell Group, with some institutions having more than one encampment; across universities in Australia, beginning with the University of Sydney; and in Canada, including an encampment at McGill University. On May 7, protests spread further on European campuses after mass arrests at the University of Amsterdam campus occupation, including occupation of campus buildings at Leipzig University in Germany, Sciences Po in France, and Ghent University in Belgium. As of May 8, protests have taken place in more than 25 countries. On May 13, approximately 1,000 Dutch students and university staff took part in a national walk-out.

== Background ==
By May 6, 2024, student protests had occurred in 45 of the 50 states in the United States and the District of Columbia, with encampments, occupations, walkouts or sit-ins on almost 140 campuses. Thirty-four encampments were established in the United Kingdom; across universities in Australia, beginning with the University of Sydney; and in Canada, including an encampment at McGill University. On May 7, protests spread further on European campuses after mass arrests at the University of Amsterdam campus occupation, including occupation of campus buildings at Leipzig University in Germany, Sciences Po in France, and Ghent University in Belgium. By May 8, protests had taken place in more than 25 countries, and on May 13, approximately 1,000 Dutch students and university staff took part in a national walk-out.

== Argentina ==
On April 25, around 20 students held a sit-in in the lobby of NYU Buenos Aires, aiming to show solidarity with NYU protesters in Manhattan and calling on the institution to cut ties with Israel.

== Australia ==
=== University of Sydney ===
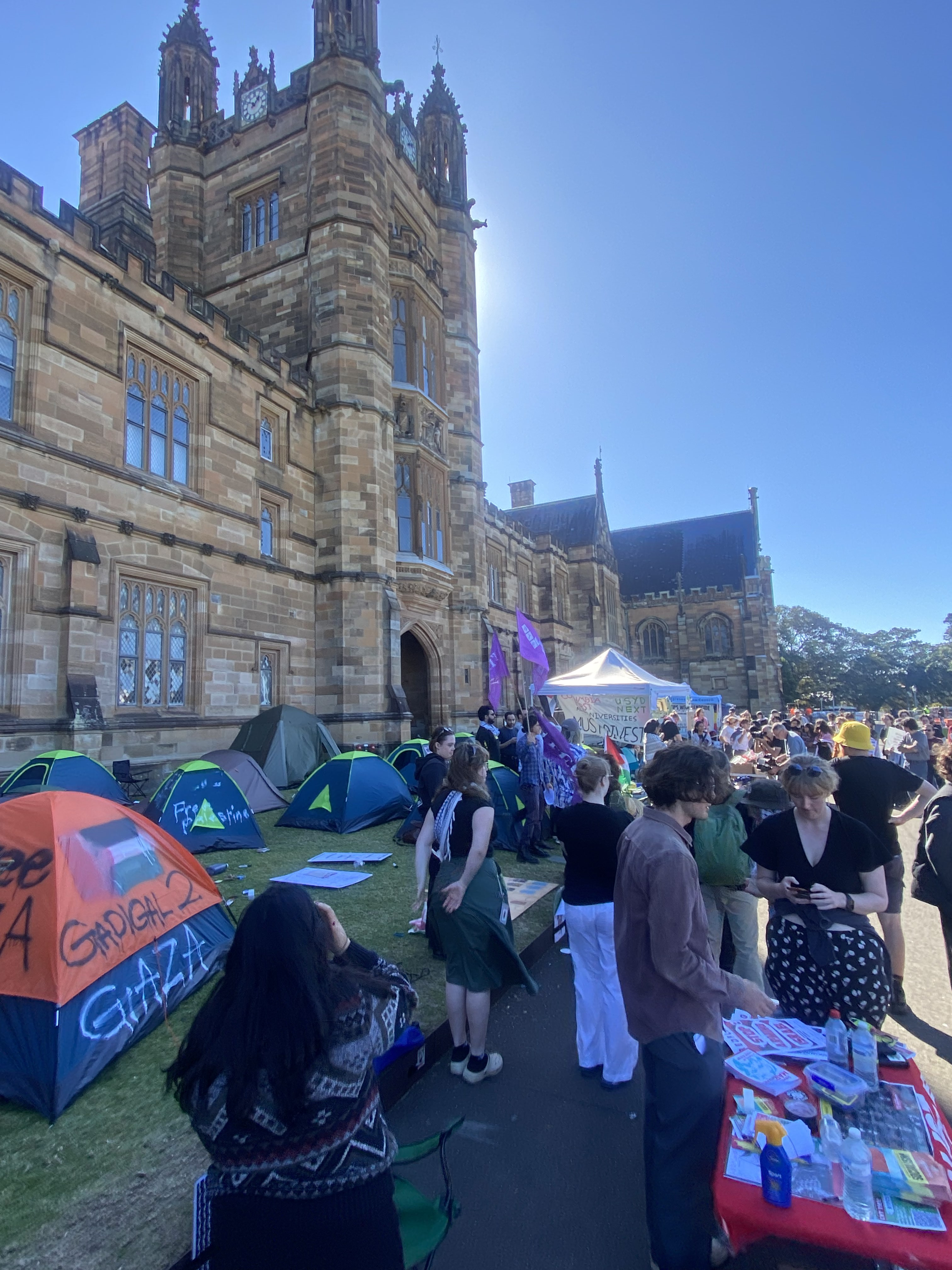
"Gaza Solidarity Encampment" at the University of Sydney, April 26, 2024

On April 23, an encampment was set up at the University of Sydney, in the main Quadrangle, underneath the historic clock tower. Students have been supporting the camp by donating food, materials and supplies. Chief executive of the university Mark Scott says he is allowing the protests to continue, despite incidents such as graffiti that are being investigated, because protest and free speech are "part of who we are", noting other protests related to issues such as the World War I conscription debate and the Vietnam War anti-war movement.

The university ordered the encampment to disperse on June 14, saying that the protest was disrupting preparations for the next semester, and that the university considered these preparations "core university operations", for which disruption by protests is not allowed. Start of semester welcome events are usually held on the lawn the encampment is located on.

On June 17, the encampment ended, with students saying further protest action would come in the next semester.

=== University of Melbourne ===
On April 25, University of Melbourne students began an encampment on the South Lawn of the main campus in Parkville. Protesters and counter-protesters have been regularly interacting, including a standoff where both groups stood on either side of a moat. Far-right political activist Avi Yemini attended a "No Hate" rally on May 3 in support of Israel. The protesters were outnumbered by Palestine protesters, including those from the encampment. There was a scuffle between him and two pro-Palestine protesters, who allegedly had a microphone shoved in their faces and one of whom was pushed to the ground by a bodyguard. An executive of the Melbourne University Jewish Students' Society, which helped organise the rally, said that they were disappointed with Yemini "co-opting" the rally, which they said was "dehumanising" to both the encampment and Jewish students, with him turning a day that was supposed to be about "unity" into something now "clouded by his image". On May 15, demonstrators began occupying the Arts West building. They also unofficially renamed the building "Mahmoud’s Hall", referencing a Palestinian student killed in Palestine before he was due to begin studies at the University of Melbourne. Classes in the building have been cancelled. On May 16, deputy vice-chancellor Michael Wesley announced that Victoria Police were authorized to use force to evict the protesters from the building. A meeting was held between protesters and university administrators was held on May 17, but no agreement was reached.

On May 22, protesters agreed to end the encampment and occupation of the Arts West building, after the university agreed to disclose connections to weapons manufacturers.

=== Monash University ===
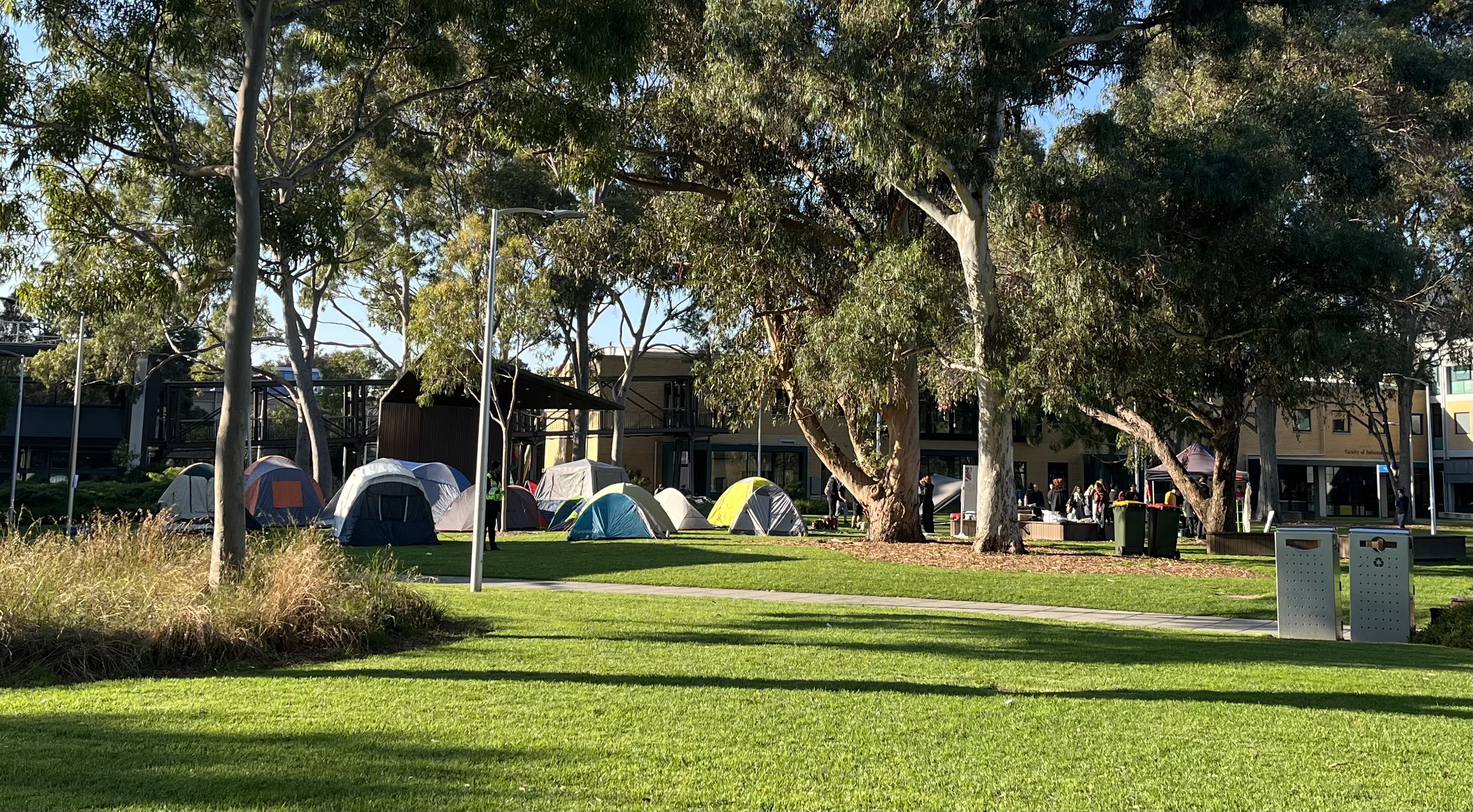
Monash encampment on 2 May 2024 (second day after founding)

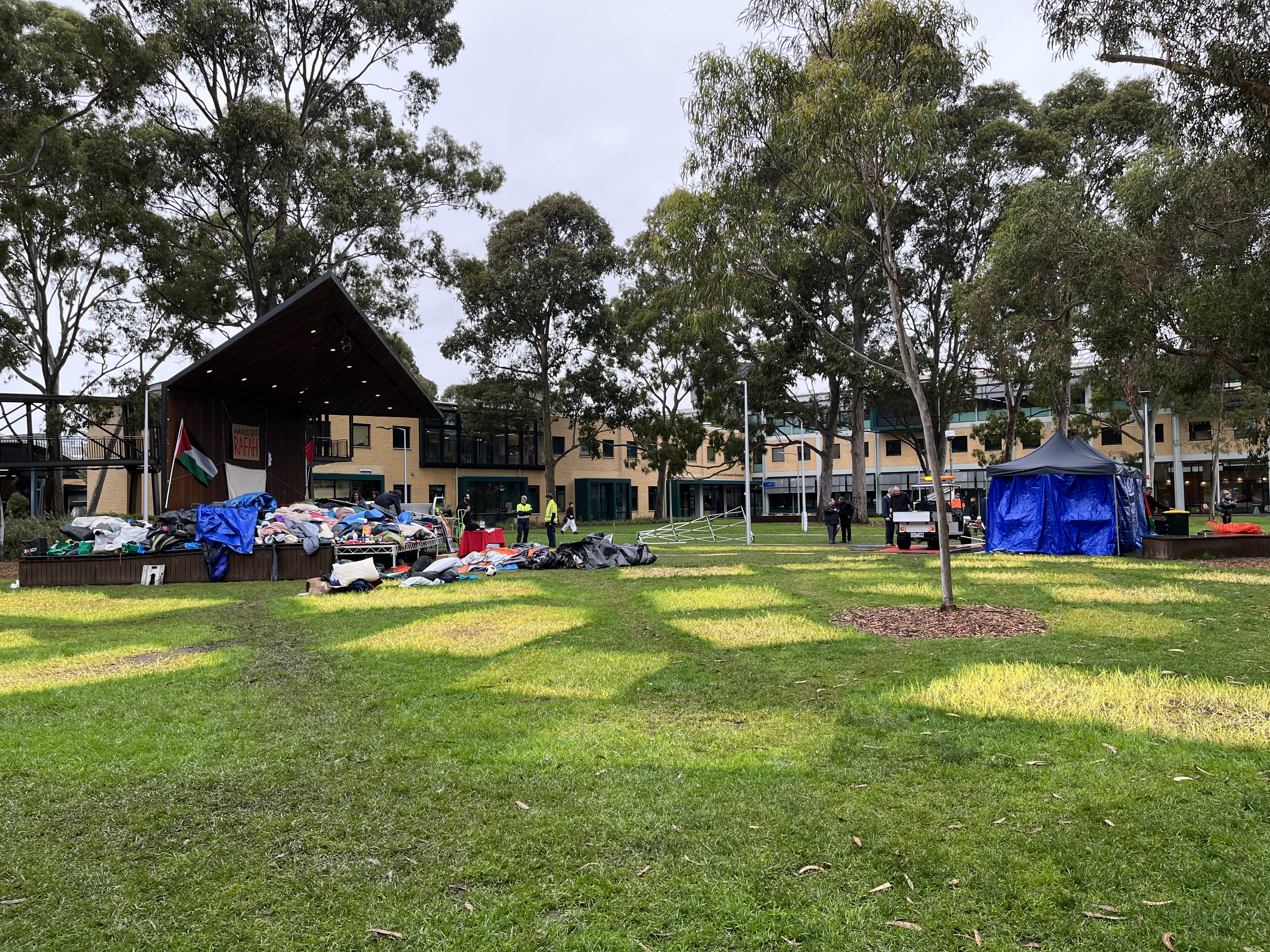
The remains of the encampment while being cleared on 17 May 2024

An encampment started at Monash University on May 1. The camp was regularly attacked, with protesters alleging they were physically assaulted and verbally harassed. On May 2, the camp was attacked by counter-protesters draped in the Australian and Israeli flags, who destroyed the camp kitchen and shook a protester's tent whilst she slept. Police attended, but no arrests were made, with 10 people being given a move-on direction. A GoFundMe was started to fund repair of the damage caused. After that incident, the Victorian Greens issued a statement calling for better protection of protesters from universities and the police.

On May 8, counter-protesters attempted to storm the stage where speeches were being given, with the protesters and counter-protesters separated by university security. Not all interactions between opposing groups have been violent; an Israel supporter and a Palestine supporter were photographed shaking hands after discussing the war. On May 8, Monash ordered the removal of "Zionists not welcome" signs, saying they "likely constitute harassment and/or vilification". Police are investigating the harassment of the camp. The encampment was cleared on May 17 after encampment organisers informed the university they would dismantle it. Some protesters claimed it was not a voluntary decision, saying that they had been picked off one by one during the week and banned from the encampment area under threat of suspension or expulsion, with the few remaining protesters telling the university security not to dismantle the camp. Video shows roughly 15 security guards packing up tents and sleeping bags.

=== University of Adelaide ===
On May 1, an encampment was started at the University of Adelaide. The University said that it supported free speech and lawful protests, but would not tolerate hate speech or intimidation of students or staff. On May 8, protesters were attacked with fireworks after 11pm, with a video taken by a protester showing fireworks going off around the camp, with the protesters shouting "cowards" as the people responsible for the fireworks were not visible to the camp. Protesters said a similar incident happened on 6 May. South Australia Police said they are investigating the incident, and the university is increasing security.

On May 28, the encampment ended.

=== University of Queensland ===
Students at the University of Queensland held a rally and set up an encampment on April 29, with a rival pro-Israel camp also set up. The pro-Israel protesters have said strangers came into their camp and spat on a sign that said "Zionist and proud". On 9 May, protesters marched to the Boeing center on campus, with protesters including Greens MP Max Chandler-Mather saying Boeing products, including planes, missiles and other weapons were "taking lives". A window in the center was smashed, although police have not made any arrests or received any complaints relating to this incident or any other since the protest has started. Protesters briefly occupied a building on May 16, with police not being called. The university asked protesters to leave, but on May 18 protesters claimed they were unaware of this decision and would not be dispersing regardless. On May 20 the university banned the chant "out, out, Israel out" and the word "intifada".

On 1 June, an agreement was reached. The UQ student union and UQ Muslim Students for Palestine agreed to end the encampment that day, in exchange for disclosing of ties to Israel and increasing humanitarian scholarships for students affected by the war. However, UQ Students for Palestine, another group involved in organizing the encampment, was not a party to the agreement, saying they did not agree with any agreement limiting their rights to protest. However, they welcomed the increase in scholarships and said they would be dismantling the camp, saying "during the uni break there is nothing much to disrupt", vowing to return next semester.

=== Australian National University ===
An encampment was started at the Australian National University on April 29.

On April 30, Beatrice Tucker, organizer of the encampment, said in an interview with ABC Radio Canberra that “Hamas deserve our unconditional support – not because I agree with their strategy – complete disagreement with that, but the situation at hand is if you have no hope … nothing can justify what has been happening to the Palestinian people for 75 years”. By May 9, disciplinary proceedings had started against Tucker based on the contents of the interview, with her being provisionally suspended until a hearing on May 14. On June 6, Tucker was expelled from ANU, being the first pro-Palestine student protester in Australia to be expelled since the war started on October 7.

After a Zoom meeting on May 8 of the ANU Students' Association, allegations of anti-Semitic gestures, including a Nazi salute and a person putting a finger to below their nose to mimic a Hitler moustache, were put forth after the ANU Union of Jewish Students put forth a motion to address anti-Semitism. The group ANU for Palestine also alleged they were targeted with obscene gestures such as people mouthing the words "fuck you", giving "the middle finger" and making "gagging gestures". ANU has said it is investigating, whilst Prime Minister Anthony Albanese said that there needed to be a "dialling down" of debate, calling for "respect for everyone. Anti-Semitism has no place in Australia. Islamophobia has no place in Australia."

On May 15, ANU requested the disbanding of the encampment, with seven students called into a meeting, faced with disciplinary action if they did not attend. In the meeting, they were again threatened with disciplinary action if they did not vacate by May 17. The students were asked to provide a list of names of other students participating in the encampment. Students that were at the meeting felt as if the meeting was an intimidation tactic reminiscent of McCarthyism.

On May 28, the encampment was relocated after ANU threatened to use police to clear it.

=== Deakin University ===
An encampment started at Deakin on May 7, and was originally slated to run until May 10, however the encampment ran beyond that date. By May 9, Deakin said it was investigating a staffer that was heard threatening to burn down the camp as well as incidents of hate speech, and police were investigating an altercation at Deakin. Deakin requested the "immediate dismantling and removal of the current encampment" on May 13, however the camp did not disperse on that date and protesters have indicated they will not be dismantling the camp. The police responded neutrally, by saying they were aware of the decision and it was a matter for the university, and that police would respond to "potential breaches of the peace or criminal offences." Deakin students said they would be holding a "closing rally" on May 22, and that more protests would follow next semester.

=== Other encampments and protests ===
An encampment started at Curtin University in Perth on May 1. By May 7, two encampments in Melbourne had been set up at RMIT University and La Trobe University.

La Trobe students demanded the university cut ties with Honeywell, which makes engines for the General Atomics MQ-9 Reaper drone, used by the Israeli military. La Trobe ordered students to leave on May 17, citing safety issues as their reason for issuing the order, although no classes were disrupted and there was no indication of vandalism, occupation of buildings or property damage, unlike other encampments in Melbourne. La Trobe commenced disciplinary proceedings on May 20, and on May 21, the encampment ended.

The University of Wollongong set up an encampment on May 8, with the protesters demanding the university cut ties with local steel manufacturer Bisalloy, which has provided Israeli defense companies with armour-grade steel.

Students at the Sandy Bay campus of University of Tasmania established a solidarity encampment on May 7. As of June 8, the students are still camping out. One of their demands is that the University cut ties with the multinational German corporation Hensoldt, because it supplies radar and other surveillance systems to Israel.

A protest was held at the University of New England on May 26. A security guard at the university was suspended after video showed him smacking one protester's phone out of her hands.

Two protesters were arrested and charged with assaulting two security guards at Western Sydney University on October 9.

== Austria ==
On May 6, a solidarity encampment was established at the University of Vienna. The following day, protesters began an encampment at the university. On May 8, a pro-Israel counter-protest occurred on campus. The three day old peaceful encampment was dispersed by police on May 9.

== Bangladesh ==
Thousands of people held a protest march at the University of Dhaka on May 6.

== Belgium ==
On May 6, about 100 students occupied a portion of Ghent University. The students said the protest would last until May 8. Protesters also occupied a building at Université libre de Bruxelles (ULB). The university said they would file a police complaint against protesters after a Jewish students union head was assaulted. On May 13, protests then occupied buildings at the Dutch-speaking Vrije Universiteit Brussel (VUB) and the Catholic research university KU Leuven.

On May 17, rector Rik Van de Walle announced that it would sever ties with three Israeli research institutions who he said did not pass the "Ghent University human rights test." On May 31, after several weeks with an encampment, UGent announced that it will be severing ties with all Israeli universities and research institutions.

== Brazil ==
On May 7, protesters at the University of São Paulo began occupying a building at the school.

== Canada ==
On April 22, students set up an encampment at the University of Alberta, in Edmonton. A week later, on April 29, an encampment of about 30 tents was set up on the Point Grey campus of the University of British Columbia, in Vancouver. About 100 protesters were present on its first day, calling on the institution to divest from Israel.

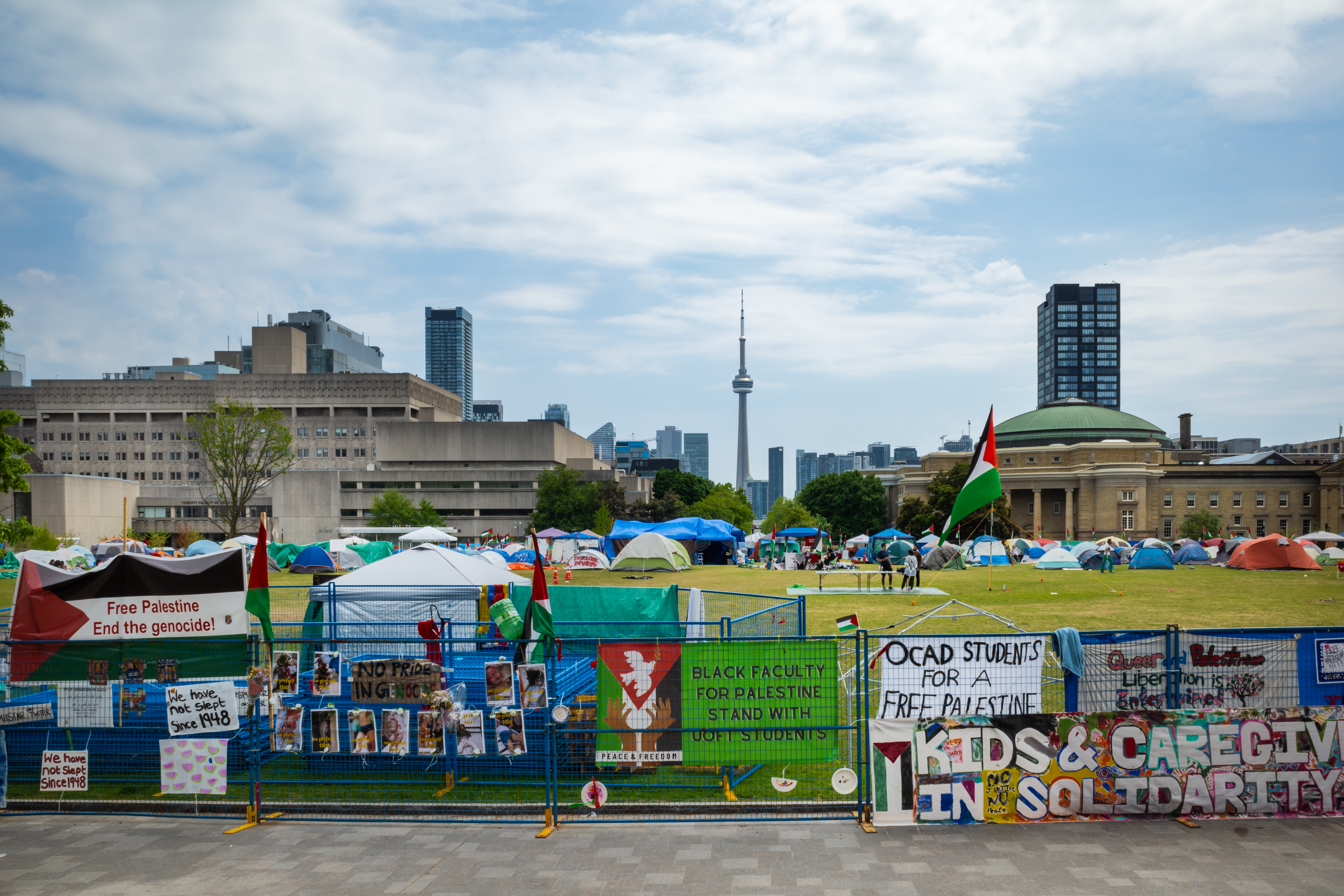
University of Toronto encampment as of May 20, 2024

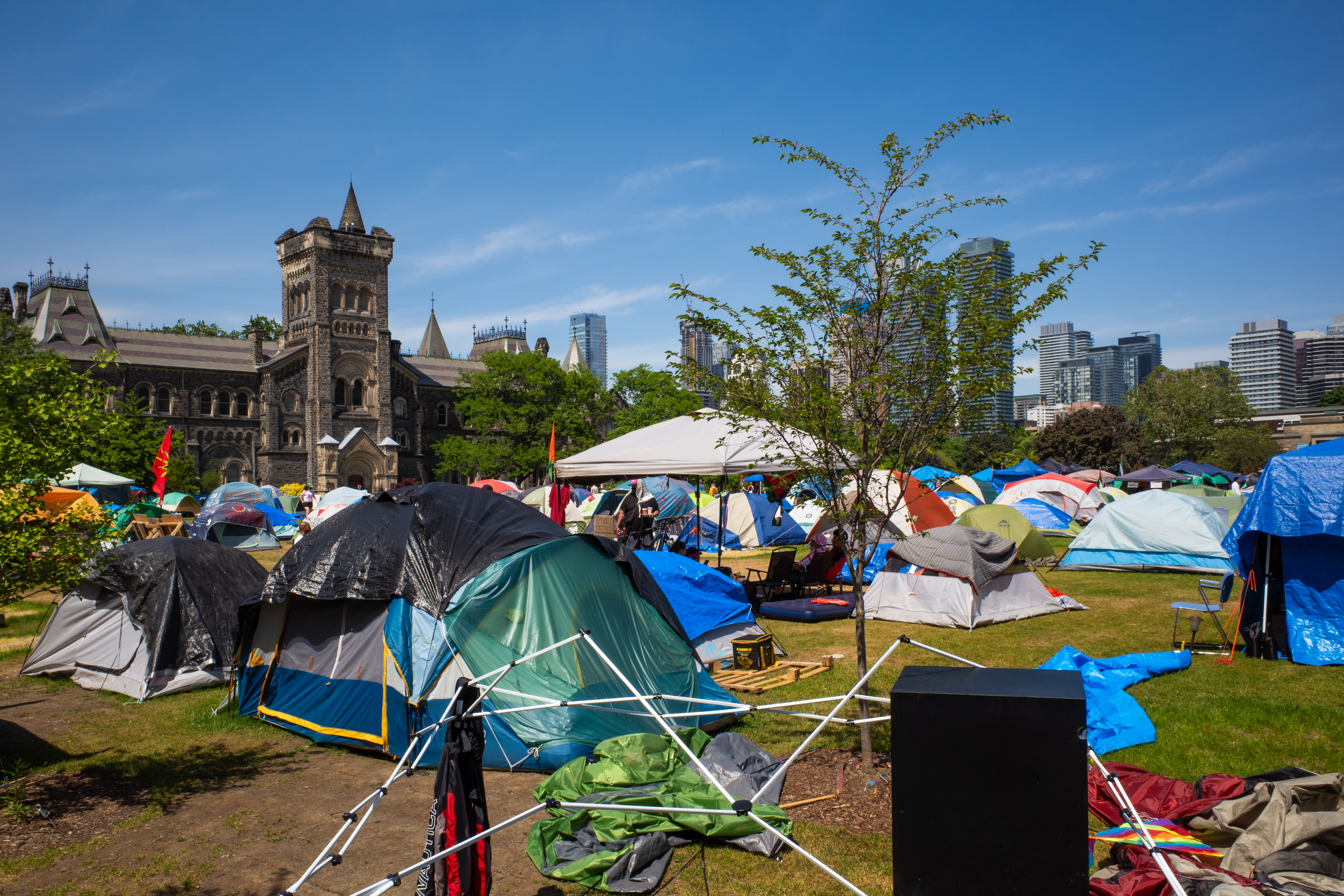
University of Toronto encampement on May 26, 2024

On May 1, an encampment was built outside Tabaret Hall at the University of Ottawa. On Vancouver Island, encampments were set up at the University of Victoria and Vancouver Island University; and an encampment was also briefly set up at the University of Western Ontario, lasting a day before disappearing. The following day, students at the University of Toronto set up an encampment of about 50 tents at King's College Circle on its St. George campus. On May 5, an encampment was set up at McMaster University, and a protest was held at the University of Waterloo the day after. On May 7, an encampment was set up at the University of Manitoba, scheduled to last for three days. Protests were held at Trent University and Emily Carr University the following day. On May 9, an encampment was set up at the University of Windsor, and police in Calgary used flashbangs to remove protesters from an encampment set up at the University of Calgary. The next day, a die-in protest was held at Memorial University of Newfoundland.

On May 12, an encampment was set up at Dalhousie University, an encampment was set up at the University of Waterloo the following day. An encampment was set up at UBC Okanagan on May 14, and protests were also held at the University of Saskatchewan and University of Regina on May 17. On May 21, an encampment was set up at the University of Guelph, and students attending Memorial University of Newfoundland and Labrador set up an encampment outside the Art's and Administration Building in St. John's.

On May 23, students at Simon Fraser University occupied their campus' Belzberg Library to demand divestment from military assets supplied to Israel, coinciding with a Board of Governors meeting. Despite protests and an open letter, the Board did not discuss divestment. On May 30, SFU president Joy Johnson and the Board of Governors agreed to discuss divestment from arms companies after community pressure, protests, and a faculty vote. They committed to reviewing their Responsible Investment Policy with community input.

On June 3, protesters occupied a Concordia University building for around an hour. On June 5, an encampment was set up at York University, which was subsequently cleared by Toronto police on June 6.

On June 7, University of Waterloo agreed to several demands to disclose investments and to base investment decisions on human rights and other social factors.

On June 10, a protest was held at Brock University.

On October 7, 2024, walkouts were held on all three of the University of Toronto's campuses in downtown Toronto (St. George), Mississauga, and Scarborough.

=== McGill University ===
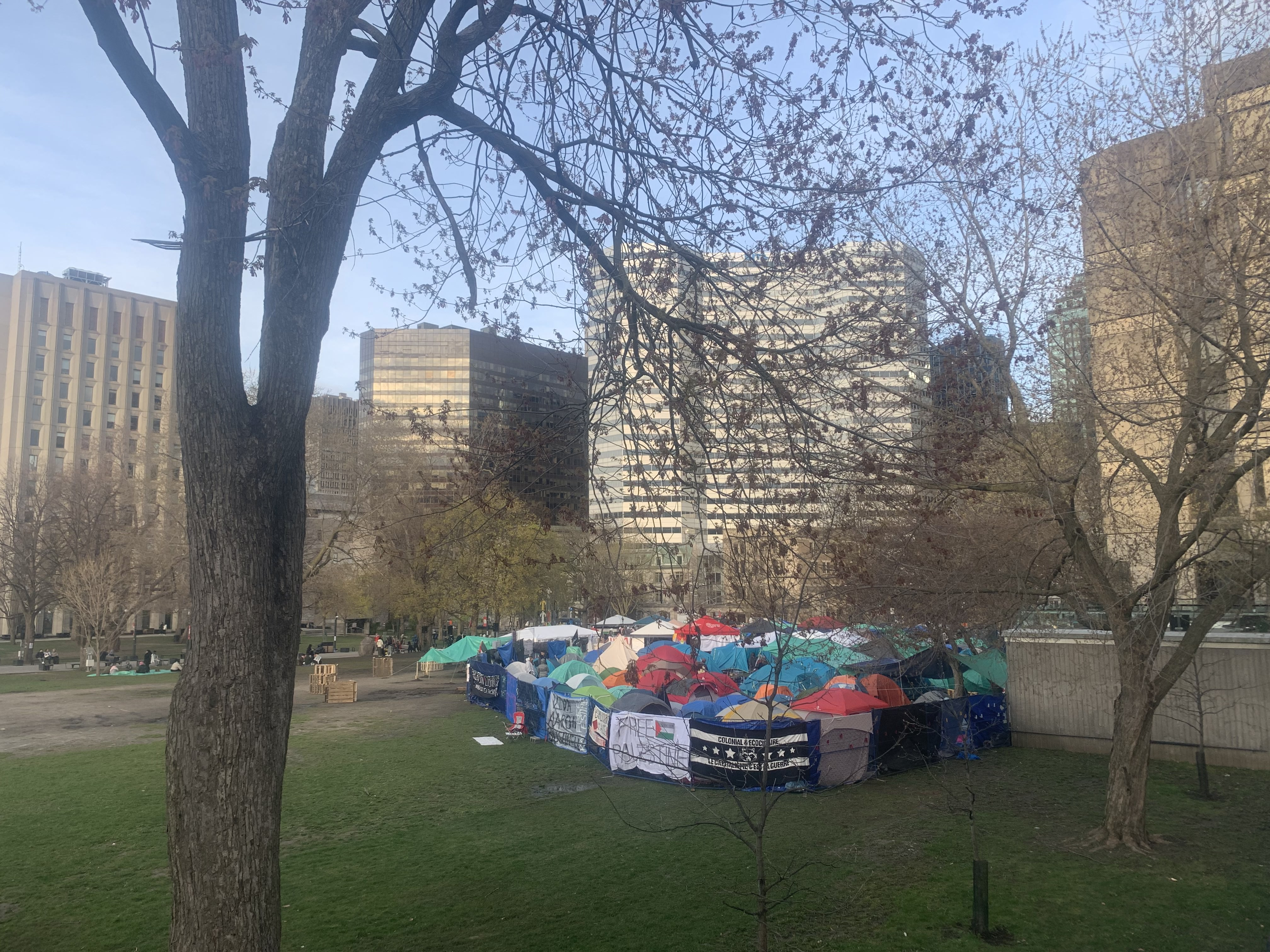
Approximately 80 tents form the encampment at McGill University, Montreal, May 2, 2024.

On April 27, an encampment of around 20 tents was set up on the grounds of McGill University in Montreal, calling on McGill and nearby Concordia University to cut ties with Israel. The encampment has since grown to about 100 tents and is occupied by students and faculty from various universities in Montreal. Both McGill and the premier of Quebec, François Legault, have declared the encampment illegal and called on Montreal police to dismantle it. As of yet, they have not complied with the request. They have qualified the protest as peaceful.

== Costa Rica ==
An encampment was set up at the University of Costa Rica on May 1. Organizers said the encampment was built in solidarity with Palestine and student protesters in the United States.

== Cuba ==
On May 3, students at the University of Havana held a rally in support of Palestine and student protesters in the United States.

== Denmark ==
A pro-Palestinian encampment was set up at the University of Copenhagen. On May 28, the University of Copenhagen announced that it would divest from companies that operated in occupied Palestinian territories including AirBnB, Booking.com, and eDreams; and on June 2, the student organizers ended the encampment. The protesters, however, have warned a new encampment may be set up in the future should the university not keep its commitment to divest.

== Egypt ==
Students at the American University of Cairo held a protest on April 22, calling for the university to divest from Hewlett-Packard and Axa.

== Finland ==
On May 6, a protest encampment was set up at the University of Helsinki. On May 15, police detained thirteen protesters at the university after a protest inside the main building. On May 21, the rector announced that it would sever ties with Israeli universities and terminated its student exchange programs. On June 1, the encampment outside the Porthania building showed no signs of declining, according to Helsinki Times. The movement in inspired by similar actions in Norway, where five universities cut ties with Israeli institutions.

== France ==
On April 25, students at Sorbonne University in Paris set up an encampment in support of Palestine in the university's main courtyard. Four days later, police removed dozens of students from the courtyard. On May 7, approximately one hundred students occupied an amphitheatre at Sorbonne University until they were removed by police.

=== Sciences Po ===
At Sciences Po, in Paris, an encampment of about 60 students was broken up by the Compagnies Républicaines de Sécurité on April 24. A group of students decided to stay before the police withdrew. On April 26, protesters then occupied a campus building and barricaded themselves inside the university. On May 7, police dispersed a group of students who had barricaded themselves inside the university’s main hall and made two arrests. According to the university, 13 students are also on hunger strike.

=== École normale supérieure ===
On 21 May, students set up an encampment at the École normale supérieure of Paris. Two days later, the school announced closing until the end of the occupation.

== Germany ==
On April 25, students at New York University Berlin held a rally in solidarity with students at New York University. On May 3, police removed several protesters from a sit-in at the Humboldt University of Berlin. On May 7, police cleared an encampment that had been set up at the Free University of Berlin, and at Leipzig University, 50 to 60 people occupied a lecture hall by barricading themselves inside.

== Greece ==
Protesters established an encampment at the law school of the National and Kapodistrian University of Athens. Police cleared the encampment and arrested 28 people on May 14. As of May 27, 9 of the 27 protesters from European countries who were arrested are facing deportation.

== India ==
On April 30, students at Jawaharlal Nehru University protested against a planned visit to the campus by US Ambassador to India Eric Garcetti and in solidarity with protestors in the United States. Garcetti's visit was postponed due to the protests.

== Indonesia ==
Dozens of Padjadjaran University's students conducted a solidarity action to defend Palestine on 2 May 2024 as a response to the violent act and arrest of students who protested the war in Gaza in the US.

Hundreds of students held a Solidarity Camp Action at University of Indonesia on 3 May 2024. During the action, they condemned Israel's massacre of Palestinians and demanded full independence for Palestine. A camp was erected in solidarity with the Pro-Palestine students protest in the US.

== Iraq ==
A protest rally occurred on the campus of University of Baghdad.

== Ireland ==
Students at Trinity College Dublin set up an encampment on May 3. The encampment included a blockade of the Library and Book of Kells exhibition, and followed the issuing of a €214,000 fine on Trinity College Dublin Students' Union on May 1 for disruptive protests earlier in the year. The encampment ended on May 8 after the university agreed to cut ties with Israeli companies.

On May 11, about 100 students set up an encampment at University College Dublin (UCD).

On May 14, an encampment was set up at University College Cork.

== Israel ==
A rally marking the anniversary of the Nakba was held at Tel Aviv University on May 15. Demonstrators were barred from bringing Palestinian flags, so some brought cut-outs of watermelons.

A pro-Palestinian protest was held at Hebrew University of Jerusalem on May 28. A counter-protest by the Zionist organization Im Tirtzu was held at the same time.

Anti-Occupation Bloc activists protest against the war during the 2024 Israeli protests, but they risk arrest and assault.

== Italy ==
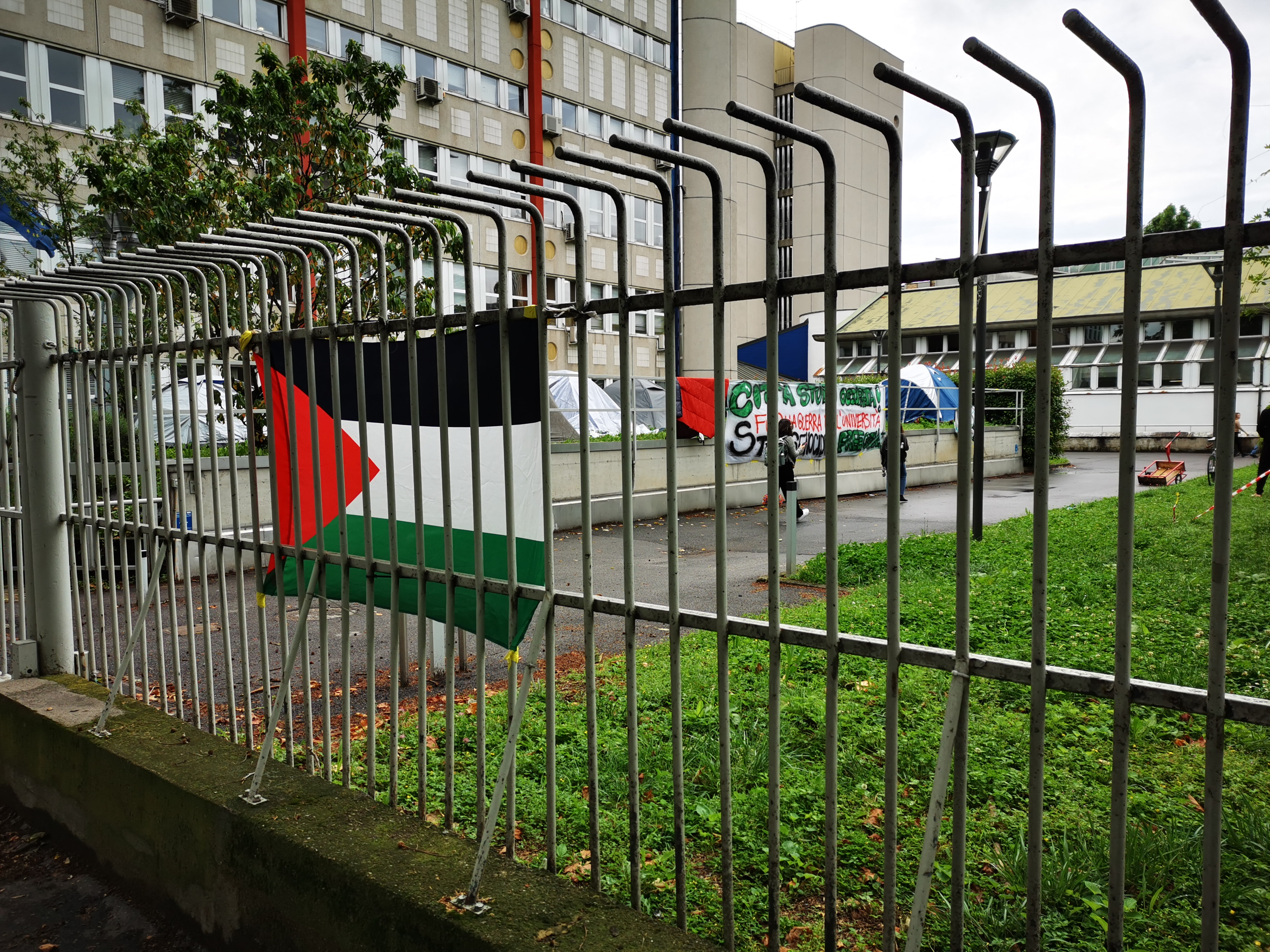
Encampment at the University of Milan, May 23, 2024

Student protests occurred at La Sapienza and Politecnico di Napoli.

On May 5, an encampment was established at the University of Bologna.

Following an encampment protest at the University of Florence, the university senate voted to support a resolution calling for a ceasefire in Gaza.

An encampment was set up at the entrance of the University of Siena on May 13. The same day, encampments were formed at the University of Pisa and Ca' Foscari University of Venice.

On May 15, encampments were set up at the University of Genoa, University of Parma, University of Bari, University of Palermo, and University of Macerata. An encampment was also established at the University of Turin on May 16, and at the University of Trento on May 17.

An encampment was set up at the University of Milan.

== Japan ==
Protests were held at the University of Tokyo and Waseda University. A solidarity encampment was established at the University of Tokyo on April 27. More encampments followed soon after at Waseda University, Sophia University, Tama Art University and the International Christian University in Tokyo, as well as Hiroshima University and Kyoto University. A protest was held at Aoyama Gakuin University on May 10.

== Kuwait ==
On April 29, a sit-in was held at the College of Science of Kuwait University, in Kuwait City. The protest involved faculty and students.

== Lebanon ==
On April 30, over 200 people gathered in a campus square at the American University of Beirut, with permission from the administration to protest for two hours. Demonstrations were also held at the Lebanese American University and other universities.

== Mexico ==
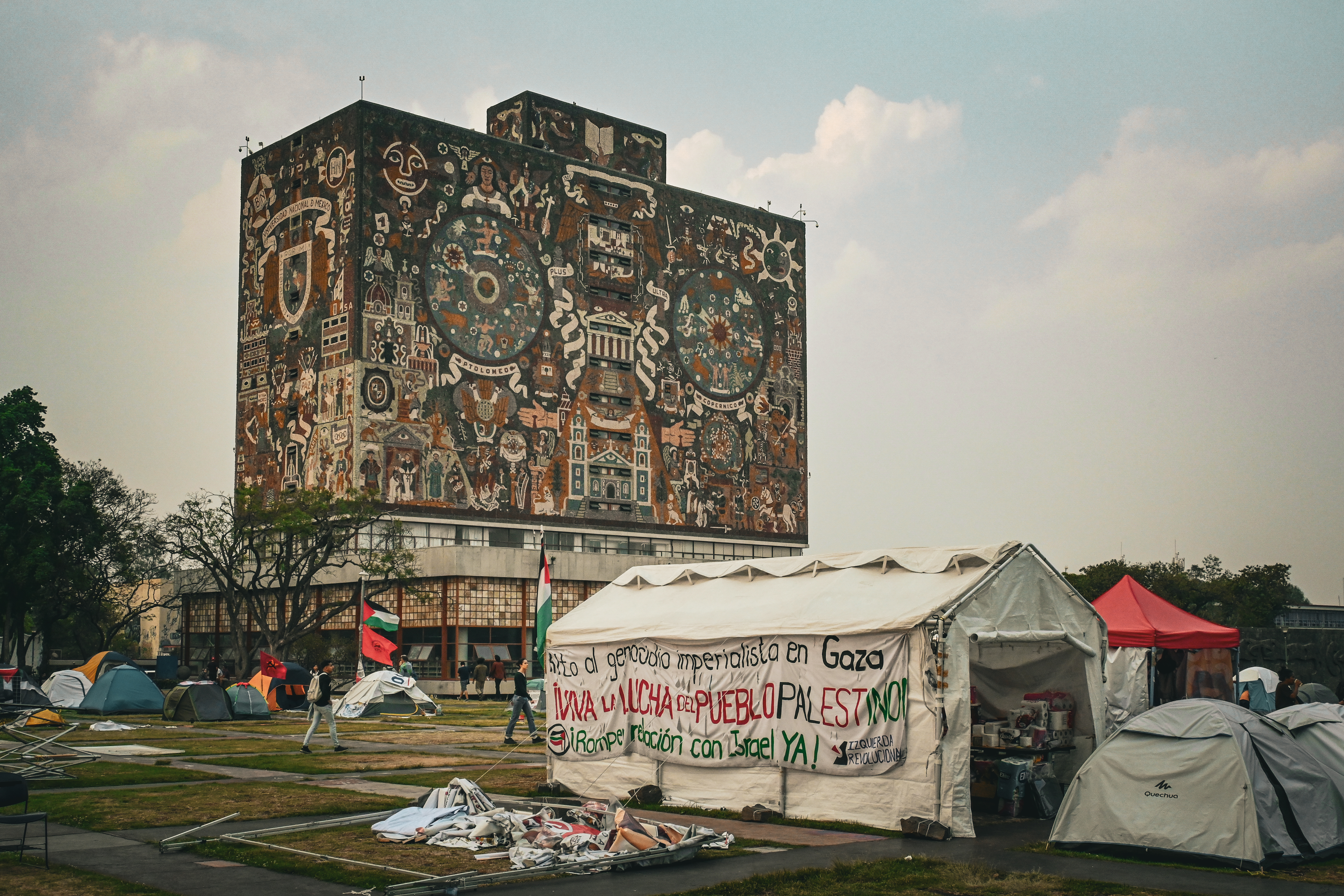
Encampment at UMAM, May 14

On May 2, pro-Palestinian protesters set up an encampment outside of the National Autonomous University of Mexico's main office in Mexico City. An encampment was also set up at the University of Guadalajara.

== Morocco ==
In May, protests were held at several universities in Morocco, including Chouaib Doukkali University, Moulay Ismail University, Abdelmalek Essaâdi University, and Mohammed V University.

== Netherlands ==
On May 7, protests took place at Utrecht University and the Delft University of Technology on May 7. An encampment was attempted at the academic library of Utrecht, where 50 people were arrested in the night between May 7 and May 8. On May 8, a new encampment at Utrecht University was set up, which was cleared during the early morning of 9 May, but without any arrests being made.

On May 13, approximately one thousand students and staff took part in a national walk-out. University buildings at the universities of Amsterdam and Groningen were also occupied. Protests, some of which taking place next to tent encampments, also took place at the campuses of Radboud University Nijmegen, Maastricht University, Eindhoven University of Technology, Delft University of Technology, Utrecht University, Leiden University (both in Leiden and The Hague), Erasmus University Rotterdam and Wageningen University & Research, as well as other campuses.

=== University of Amsterdam ===
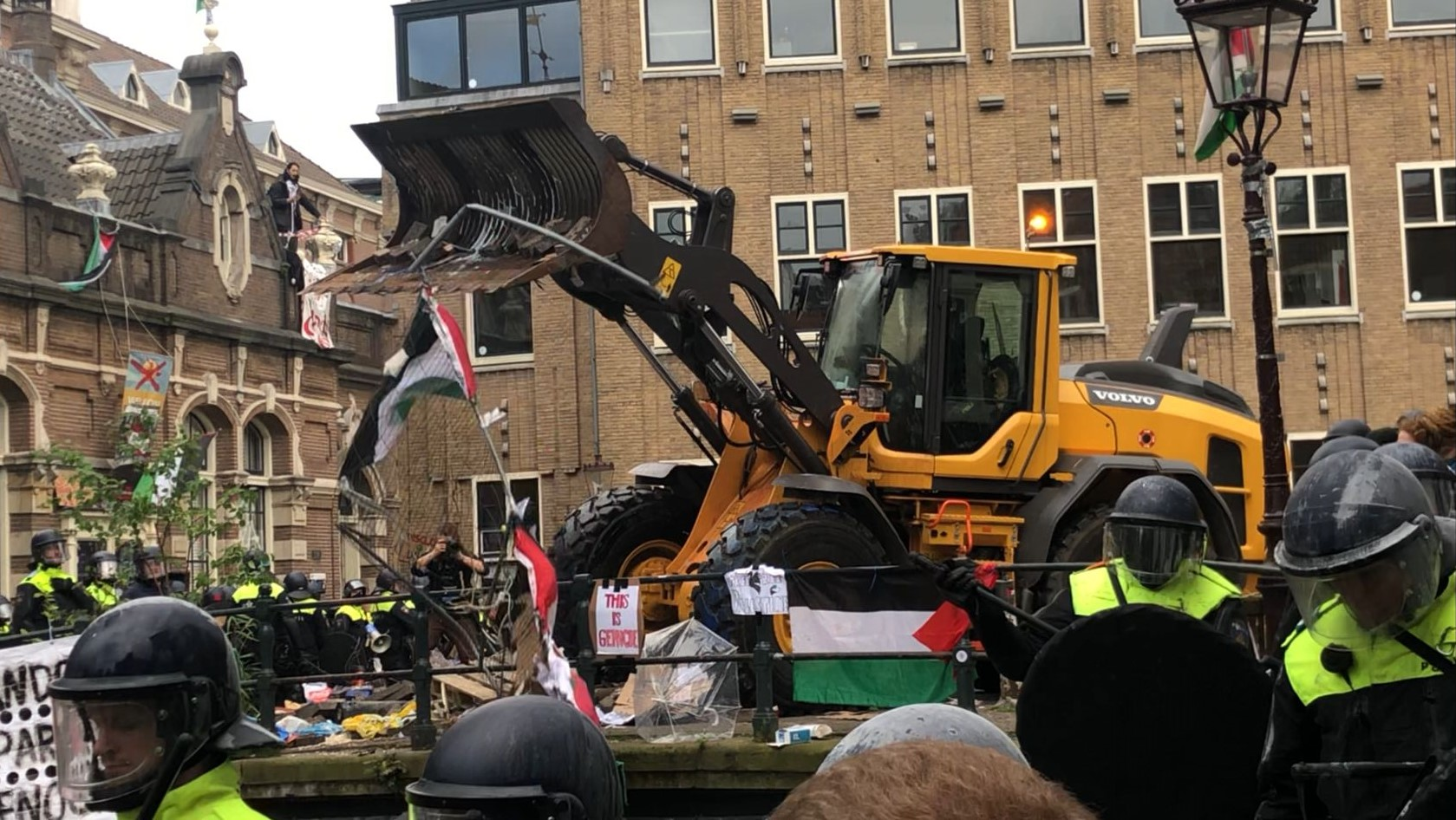
Bulldozer demolishing a barricade at the University of Amsterdam, May 7

On May 6, hundreds of students started a solidarity encampment at the University of Amsterdam (UvA). The next day, police cleared the encampment, arresting 169 people, including a member of the Provincial Council of Gelderland. Over a thousand people protested at a pro-Palestine demonstration in Amsterdam in response. On May 8, new protests emerged in Amsterdam, starting in and around university buildings and later moving to the Rokin. 36 people were arrested by the end of the night. The following day, another protest was organised which again started at the Roeterseiland university campus of University of Amsterdam. Thousands of protestors went on to march through the city. Three protestors were arrested by the police. The UvA decided to close various campus buildings for the rest of the week.

=== Radboud University Nijmegen ===
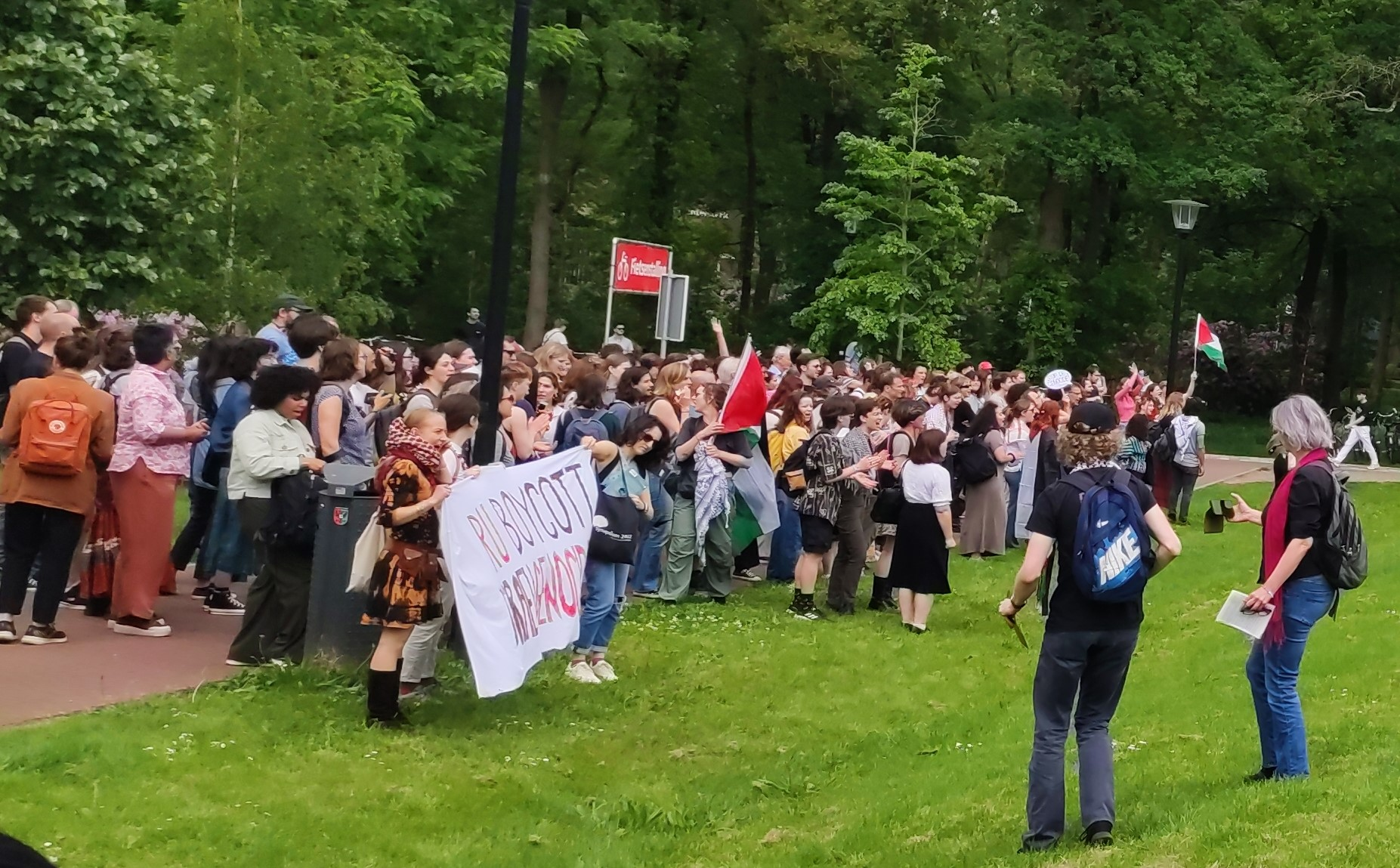
Protesters at Radboud University Nijmegen, May 14, 2024

The pro-Palestinian campus occupations at Radboud University Nijmegen in the Netherlands were a series of occupation protests, as part of the broader Gaza war protests. On 13 May 2024 protesters created an encampment, similar to other campus protests in the Netherlands, the United States and other countries. On 20 May a second encampment was established next to the universities' administrative building. On 5 June after the occupation of another university building, police cleared the encampment. The protesters demanded that the university board divest from Israel over its alleged genocide of Palestinians and invasion of the Gaza Strip, and to support Palestinian students and universities. The protests included walkouts, daily marches, temporary occupations, as well as vandalism.

== New Zealand ==
On May 1, pro-Palestinian protesters led by staged a protest outside the University of Auckland. Though the protesters had initially planned to camp overnight, organiser Layan Khalil, co-president of the University of Auckland's Students for Justice in Palestine chapter, called off the encampment after the Vice-Chancellor sent an email stating the university would allow protests and rallies but not overnight encampments. Police and university security monitored the protest.

On 21 May, 60 students and non-student protesters camped on the University of Canterbury's premises to demand that the university divest from Israel and disclose its investment portfolio. Police and university authorities monitored the protest.

On 23 May, students and staff protested in solidarity with Palestine at several New Zealand universities including the University of Canterbury, University of Auckland, University of Waikato, Victoria University of Wellington, University of Otago and Massey University. Protest spokesperson Sara Youssef called on NZ universities to disclose and cut ties with Israeli-affiliated institutions, and publicly denounce Islamophobia, antisemitism, and the alleged "genocide" in Gaza.

On 9 October, 200 pro-Palestinian protesters including students and faculty called on the University of Otago to condemn the "Gaza Genocide" and suspend collaboration with Israeli universities and companies. The protest led to the suspension of a talk by Vice-Chancellor Grant Robertson. A student was arrested following an altercation with a campus security guard near the Clocktower complex.

== Panama ==
On May 30, protesters at the University of Panama booed Israeli Ambassador Itai Bardov during a scheduled visit to the university.

== Poland ==
A protest was held at the University of Warsaw on May 17. An encampment was formed on May 24, which was cleared on June 12.

On May 15 a protest was held at Jagiellonian University in Kraków; an encampment began on the 24th and continued into June.

On June 3, an encampment began at the University of Wrocław.

== Portugal ==
On May 6, students set up an encampment inside the Faculty of Psychology of the University of Lisbon; demanding an "immediate and unconditional" ceasefire to end the genocide in Gaza, the total severance of relations with Israel and the end of fossil fuels. The protest did not affect classes. On the night of May 9, eight students were arrested by the Polícia de Segurança Pública.

An encampment was also set up at the University of Coimbra, and protests were held at the University of Porto.

== Romania ==
Students at the University of Bucharest formed an encampment on May 20.

== Slovenia ==
Protesters at the University of Ljubljana occupied a building on May 12. They left after six days.

== South Africa ==
On May 13, an encampment known as the "liberated zone" was set up at the University of the Witwatersrand.

An encampment was set up at the University of Cape Town on May 16.

== South Korea ==
A sit-in was held at Seoul National University on May 8.

== Spain ==
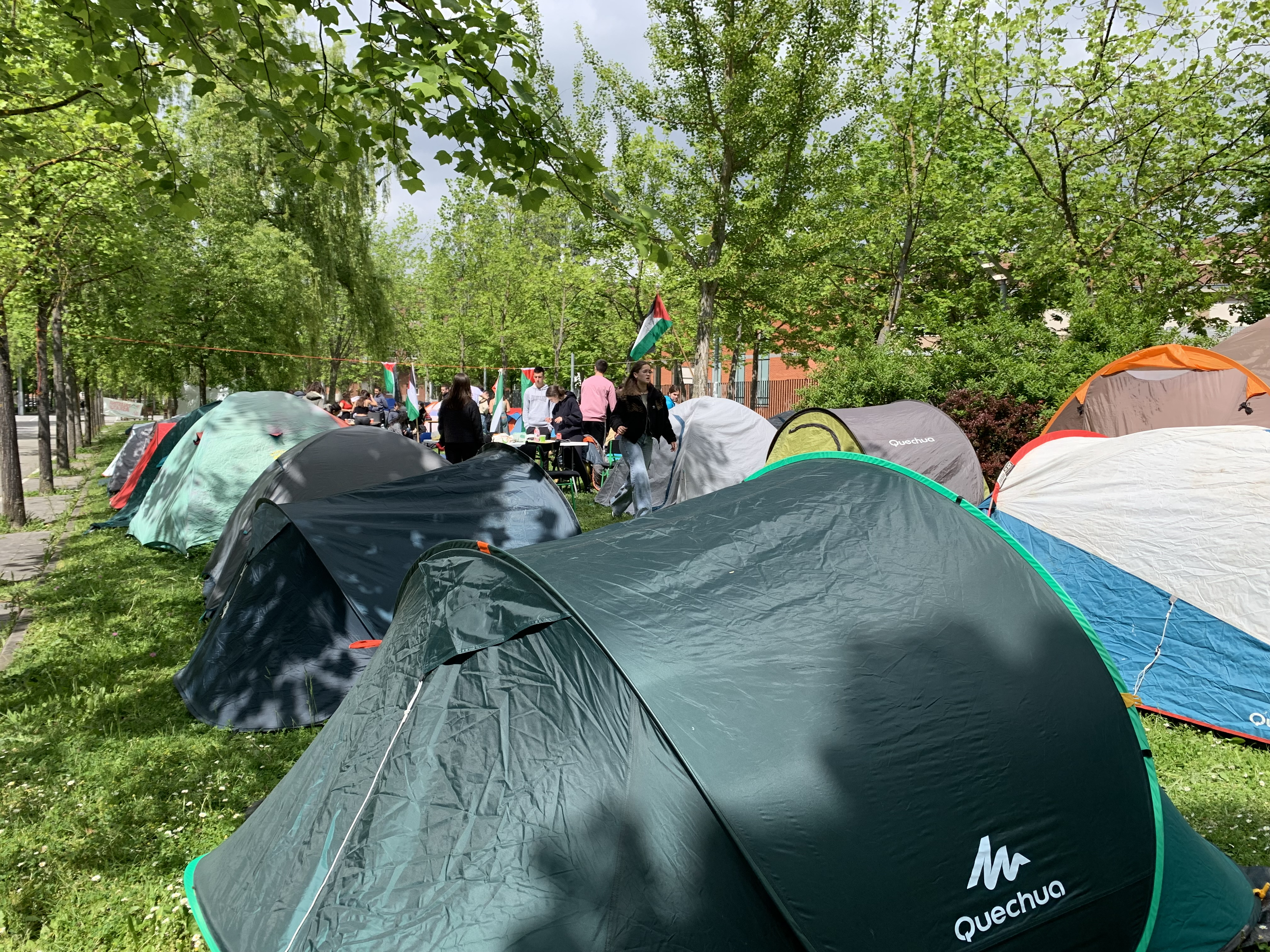
Encampment at the University of the Basque Country, May 10

On April 29, more than 60 students and faculty members of the University of Valencia set up an encampment inside a faculty building. This was done with the knowledge of the faculty's dean, although she denies giving consent. Protesters called on their institution to cut ties with Israeli universities, and stated their intention to eventually move the encampment outside.

Another encampment was set up at the University of Barcelona and the University of the Basque Country on May 6. On May 8, the University of Barcelona Senate voted to cut all ties with Israel.

An encampment was set up at Complutense University of Madrid on May 7.

Following nine days of an encampment, the University of Granada agreed to break ties with Israeli universities.

== Sweden ==
Protests were held at the Stockholm University where protesters set up tents and calls for the end of the Israeli occupation. Greta Thunberg participated.

On May 14, encampments were spotted at University of Gothenburg, KTH Royal Institute of Technology and Lund University.

On May 15, an encampment was set up at Umeå University.

On May 29, a protest organized around a visit by Deputy Prime Minister Ebba Busch took place at KTH. Twenty students were arrested. On the same day, an encampment at Lund University, which had been going for 16 days, was dismantled by the police. Protesters alleged police brutality. Around 40 people were arrested.

== Switzerland ==
On May 7, protesters occupied buildings in three Swiss universities–École Polytechnique Fédérale de Lausanne, ETH Zurich, and the University of Geneva. Police removed the protesters in Zurich.

On May 12, pro-Palestine protesters occupied a building at the University of Bern. Police cleared the building three days later.

== Tunisia ==
On April 30, students at the Institute of Press and Information Sciences (of Manouba University) held a sit-in rally.

== Turkey ==
Protests were held at Gazi University on May 3. A fight broke out between pro-Palestinian protesters and Turkish nationalists during the protest.

== United Kingdom ==
As of February and March, similar protests and calls for divestment had already been occurring at Goldsmiths, University of London, the University of Leeds, and the University of Bristol. On April 22, students from the University of Leicester Palestine Society held a protest. On April 26, a rally was held by students of University College London (UCL) on campus, though they had been campaigning for months. UCL Action for Palestine won a meeting with senior members of university's management, also on 26 April, to discuss divestment and propose aiding Palestinian students whose universities had been destroyed. After a campaign from students, the University of York announced on 27 April it "no longer holds investments in companies that primarily make or sell weapons and defence-related products or services".

In the early morning of April 26, students from the University of Warwick occupied the campus piazza; the encampment later moved to outside Warwick's Senate House before disbanding voluntarily on June 26. On May 1, encampments were established at the University of Bristol, the University of Leeds (closed by June 19 under threat of legal action), the University of Manchester (closed June 17), and Newcastle University, as well as a joint one between the University of Sheffield and Sheffield Hallam University. On May 3, protesters set up an encampment at University College, London. Protesters also occupied the library at Goldsmiths, University of London. Goldsmiths agreed to the protester's demands, naming a building after Palestinian journalist Shireen Abu Akleh, review the University's policy regarding the IHRA working definition of antisemitism, and to erect an installation on campus memorializing the protest.

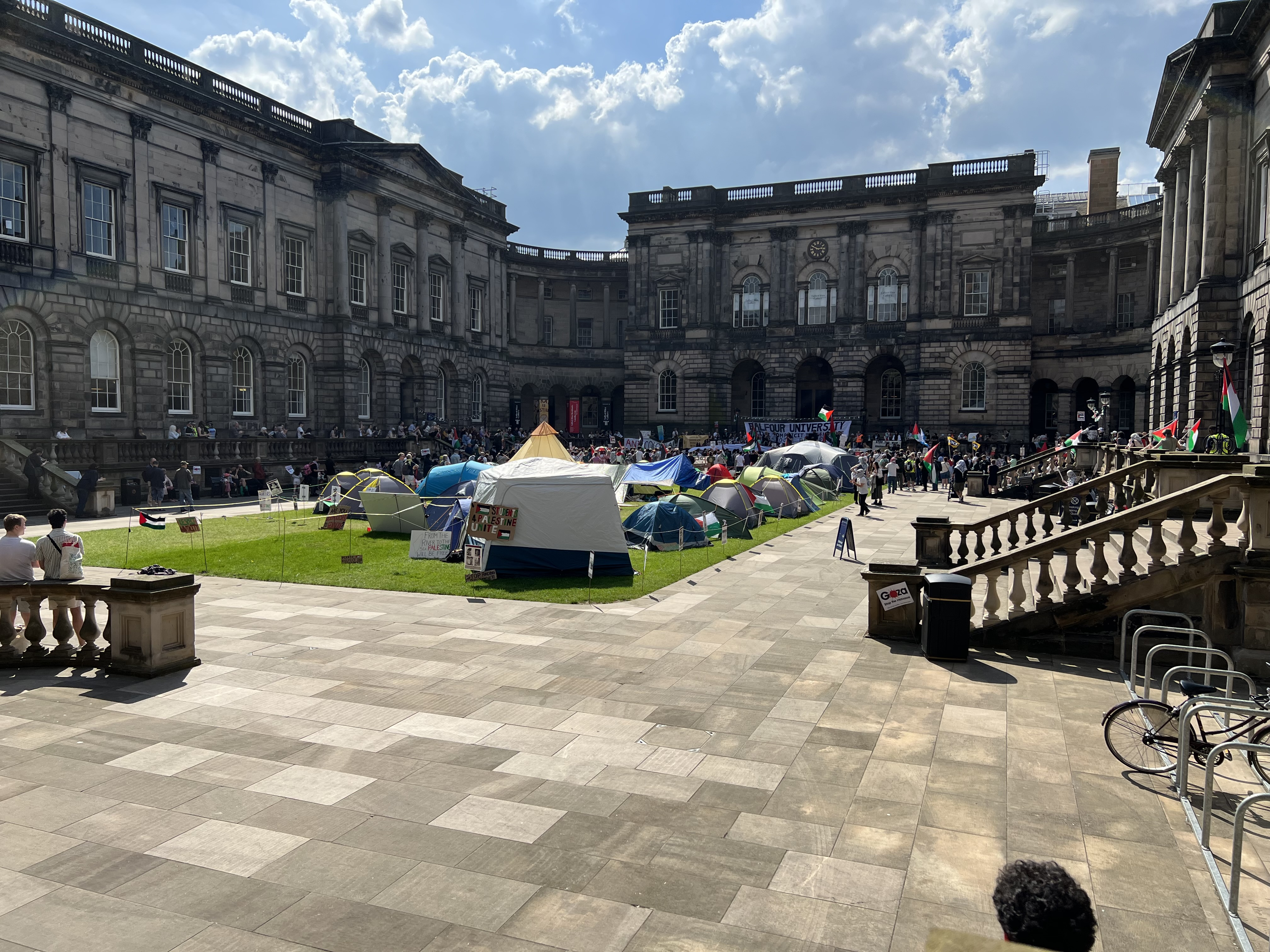
Edinburgh University student Gaza protest, Old College Quad encampment, May 2024

The following week, protesters set up encampments the University of Oxford, University of Cambridge, School of Oriental and African Studies, and University of Liverpool on May 6, with an encampment at Swansea University having been established at some point before this (voluntarily disbanded early June citing "significant wins" including divestment from Barclays Bank).

In Scotland, encampments were also established at Aberdeen University and the University of Edinburgh. On May 7, protesters at Queen's University Belfast staged a sit-in in support of Palestine. Among other demands, protesters called for Hillary Clinton to be removed as the university's chancellor. Later in the year on November 14, four protesters were arrested at Queen's University and Clinton, who was speaking, was evacuated. On May 8, Abercromby Square at the University of Liverpool was occupied and unofficially renamed after the murdered Gazan poet Refaat Alareer. An encampment was set up at Bangor University on the same day. On May 9, protesters set up encampments at Lancaster University and at the Green Heart at the University of Birmingham, with a second encampment at Birmingham being established shortly afterwards at the Chancellor's Court (closed following a court order on 14 June). On May 10, encampments were set up at Durham University (voluntarily disbanded June 21) and the University of Nottingham.

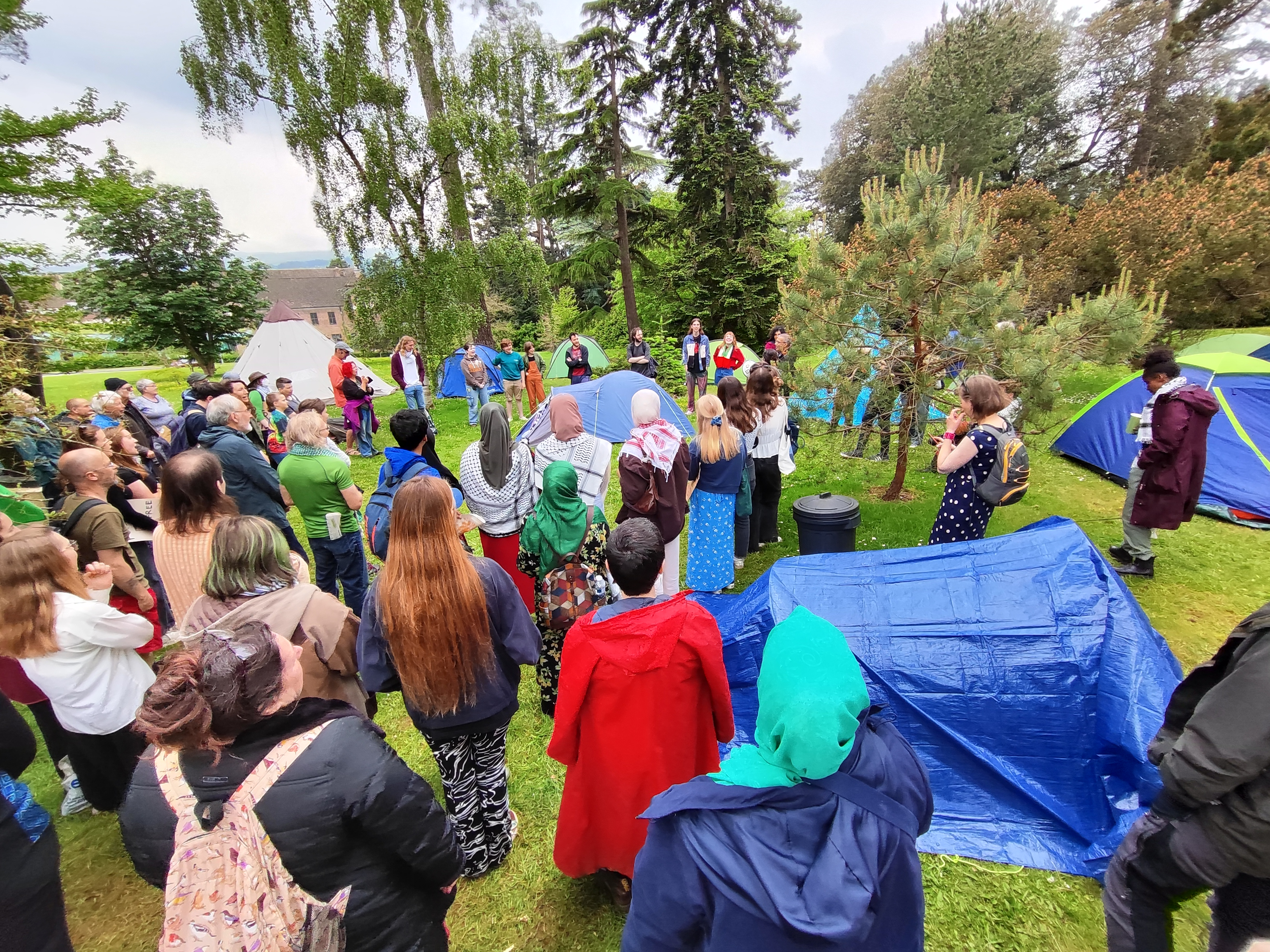
Encampment at the University of Exeter, May 18, 2024

On May 13, protesters set up an encampment at the University of Sussex's Library Square, and students held a rally followed by the establishment of an encampment at Queen Mary University of London. The next day, hundreds of pro-Palestinian protesters began occupying Marshall Hall at London School of Economics. The organizers came to an agreement with the security team that students with ID would be allowed access to the building. About 50 demonstrators remained, stating that they intended to occupy the building until their demands were met. Following a court order on June 14, they were evicted from the building on June 17. Also on May 14, encampments were also set up at Cardiff University, University of Lincoln, and students from the University of Exeter set up the "Exeter Liberation Encampment for Palestine" on the Streatham campus. The latter follows the setting up of the "FalExe Solidarity Encampent" jointly by students of Exeter and Falmouth University on the Penryn Campus. On May 15, an encampment was set up in front of Heslington Hall at the University of York.

On May 20, an encampment was set up at the University of Reading. On May 23, sixteen protesters were arrested at Cambridge University for aggravated trespass, as well as one arrest on suspicion of common assault, after an occupation of the universities' office buildings. The university accused protesters of "threatening and violent actions". On May 27, protesters at Aberystwyth University began a weeklong sit-in at the university's library, and in the evening, protesters at the University of Manchester barricaded themselves inside Whitworth Hall, disrupting exams that were due to take place in the building. An encampment was also set up at Imperial College London (voluntarily disbanded June 20).

In November, pro-Palestine protesters at Ulster University's Belfast campus booed Prince William as he arrived on campus.

In May 2025, around a hundred pro-Palestine demonstrators gathered outside of Trinity College, Cambridge to protest against the college's alleged complicity in the Gaza war, holding up signs like “Trinity College funds genocide” and “Gaza has been held hostage for 107 years.”

=== University of Oxford ===
The pro-Palestinian campus occupations at the University of Oxford (Note: Also known as the Oxford Liberated Zone or Oxford Gaza Solidarity Encampment) were occupation protests in Oxford, England, organised by Oxford Action for Palestine (OA4P). The occupations started on 6 May 2024 on the Museum of Natural History's lawn, in front of the Pitt Rivers Museum. Escalating the protests, a second encampment was established on 19 May outside the Radcliffe Camera.

Protests took place elsewhere in the city, including on Wellington Square, where 17 students were arrested after occupying the Vice-Chancellor's office on 23 May. Protesters' demands included disclosure of investments and divestment from Israeli companies, among others. The university refused to negotiate with protesters until responding to an email to arrange discussion on 5 June. The protests were reportedly supported by over 500 members of staff, and criticised by the university as intimidating.

== United States ==
Universities in the United States with Gaza War protests since April 2024. Columbia University is marked in red. Other colleges that had encampments are marked in green, and non-encampment protests are marked in blue.

Demonstrations initially spread in the United States on April 22, when students at several universities on the East Coast—including New York University, Yale University, Emerson College, the Massachusetts Institute of Technology (MIT), and Tufts University—began occupying campuses, as well as experiencing mass arrests in New York and at Yale. Protests emerged throughout the U.S. in the following days, with protest camps established on over 40 campuses. On April 25, mass arrests occurred at Emerson College, the University of Southern California, and the University of Texas at Austin.

A continued crackdown on April 27 led to approximately 275 arrests at Washington, Northeastern, Arizona State, and Indiana University Bloomington. Several professors were among those detained at Emory University, and at Washington University in St. Louis, university employees were arrested. On April 28, counter-protests were held at MIT, the University of Pennsylvania, and the University of California, Los Angeles (UCLA). On April 30, approximately 300 protesters were arrested at Columbia University and City College of New York; and pro-Israel counter-protesters attacked the UCLA campus occupation. The following day over 200 arrests were made at UCLA.

Hundreds of arrests ensued in May, notably (Note: As defined by CNN map of "Campus protests where arrests have been made since April 18", highlighting schools with 45 or more total arrests.) at the Art Institute of Chicago, University of California, San Diego, the Fashion Institute of Technology in New York, and University of California, Irvine. On May 20, the first strike by academic workers took place on campuses in California at UC Santa Cruz, followed by UC Davis and UCLA on May 28.

== Yemen ==
In the city of Dhamar, students and faculty members of the Thamar University organized a protest in solidarity with their European and American counterparts while also showing their opposition to Israel.

== See also ==
- Lists of pro-Palestinian protests
- List of George Floyd protests
- List of March for Our Lives locations
