= University of Oxford pro-Palestinian campus occupations =

- Part of the Gaza war protests (at universities)
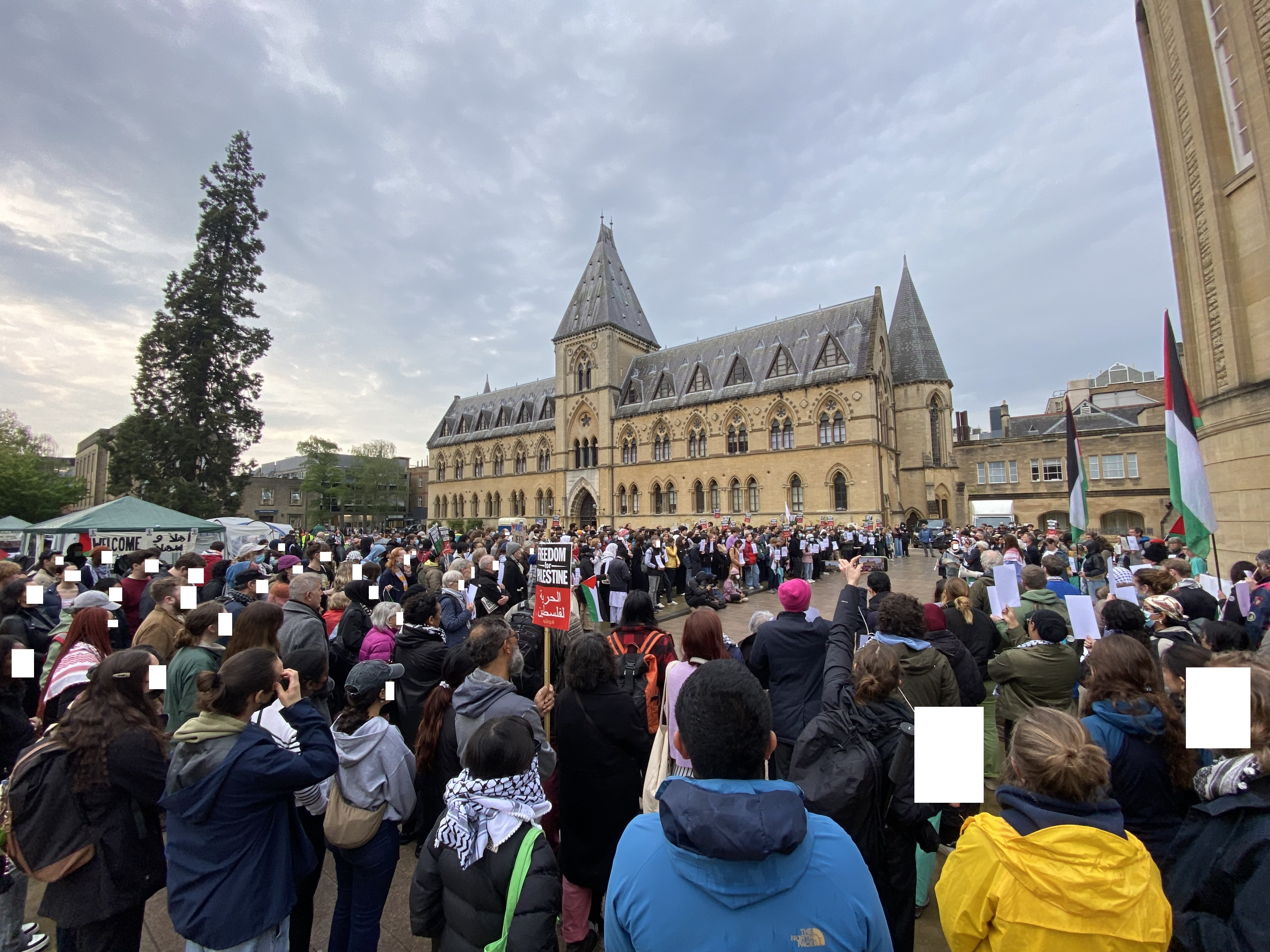
- First day of the Oxford Palestinian solidarity encampment, 6 May 2024
- Date: Museum of Natural History encampment: 6 May – 25 June 2024 (50 days); First Radcliffe Camera encampment: 19 May – 8 July 2024 (50 days); Second Radcliffe Camera occupation: 09:00 – 15:45 24 January 2025 (6¾ hrs)
- Location: Parks Road, Radcliffe Square and Wellington Square
- Goals: Disclosure of investments; Divestment from Israeli companies; End relationships with Israeli universities and maintain relationships with Gazan universities
- Methods: Protests, occupations and die-ins

Parties
Pro-Palestinian groups: Oxford Action for Palestine (OA4P); Some Oxford students and staff members	University of Oxford: Irene Tracey (Vice-Chancellor); Law enforcement: Thames Valley

Casualties
- Arrested: 17

The pro-Palestinian campus occupations at the University of Oxford (Note: Also known as the Oxford Liberated Zone or Oxford Gaza Solidarity Encampment) were occupation protests in Oxford, England, organised by Oxford Action for Palestine (OA4P). The occupations started on 6 May 2024 on the Museum of Natural History's lawn, in front of the Pitt Rivers Museum. Escalating the protests, a second encampment was established on 19 May outside the Radcliffe Camera.

Protests took place elsewhere in the city, including on Wellington Square, where 17 students were arrested after occupying the Vice-Chancellor's office on 23 May. Protesters' demands included disclosure of investments and divestment from Israeli companies, among others. The university refused to negotiate with protesters until responding to an email to arrange discussion on 5 June. The protests were reportedly supported by over 500 members of staff, and criticised by the university as intimidating.

== Background ==
The encampment took place in the context of the Israeli invasion of Gaza that began in October 2023. The University of Oxford had previously sent a message of "profound sympathy for those suffering in Gaza, Israel, and the West Bank". It started alongside protests at other universities in the UK, and was co-ordinated with an encampment at the University of Cambridge.

=== Protests on university campuses ===
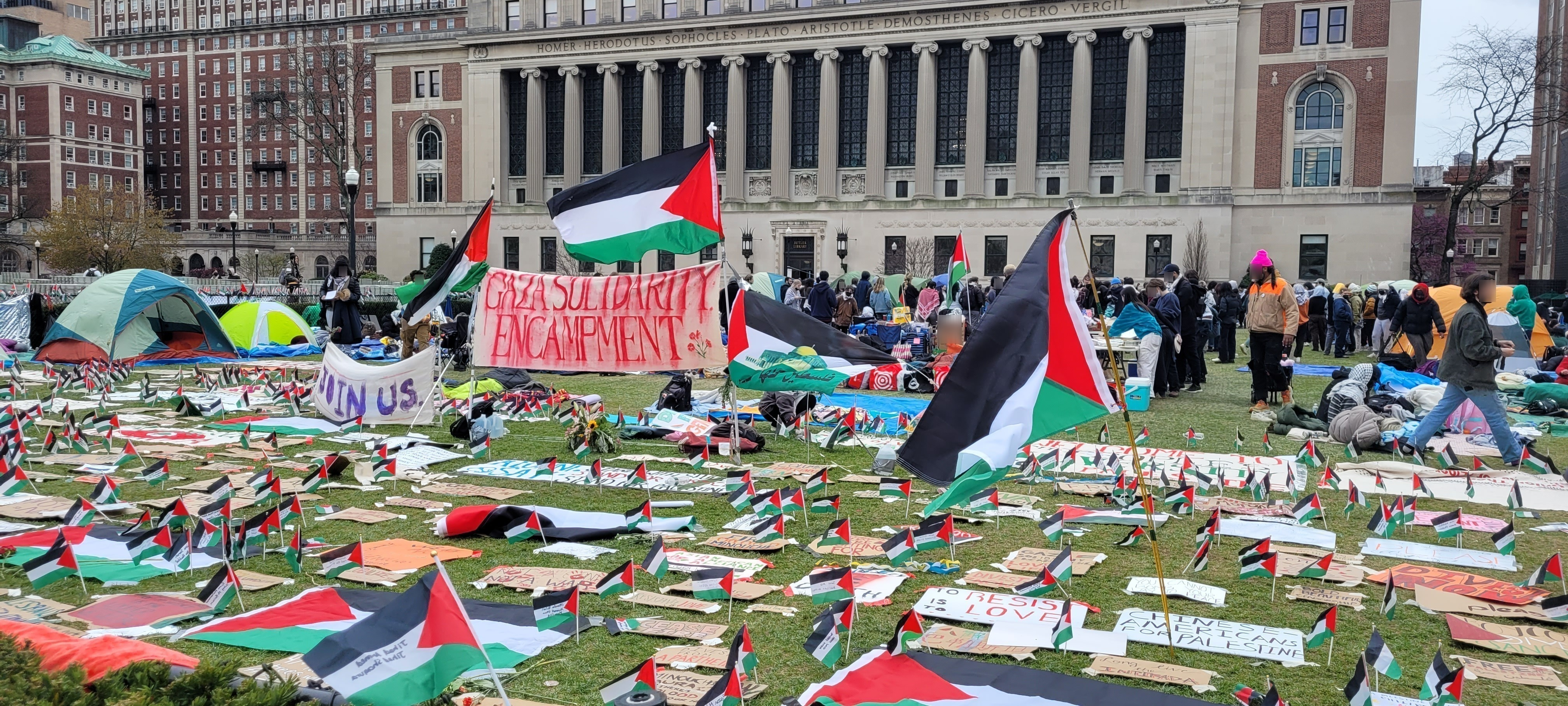
Gaza Solidarity Encampment at Columbia University, 21 April 2024

By May 6, 2024, student protests had occurred in 45 of the 50 states in the United States and the District of Columbia, with encampments, occupations, walkouts or sit-ins on almost 140 campuses. Thirty-four encampments were established in the United Kingdom; across universities in Australia, beginning with the University of Sydney; and in Canada, including an encampment at McGill University. On May 7, protests spread further on European campuses after mass arrests at the University of Amsterdam campus occupation, including occupation of campus buildings at Leipzig University in Germany, Sciences Po in France, and Ghent University in Belgium. By May 8, protests had taken place in more than 25 countries, and on May 13, approximately 1,000 Dutch students and university staff took part in a national walk-out.

== Demands and negotiations ==
Protesters demanded that the University of Oxford divest from companies linked to Israeli-occupied territories, maintain relationships with universities in Gaza rather than in Israel, and give impunity to protesters. Other demands included the disclosure of university assets, divestment from Barclays bank, and financial contribution to the rebuilding of Palestine. Campers agreed to the Thawabit. One demonstrator said they were inspired by the Rhodes Must Fall and FeesMustFall campaigns in South Africa and Oxford as well as anti-war movement history.

According to OA4P, the university continued to refuse discussion with the protesters as of 25 May, instead responding through public statements. The university said it would not negotiate due to students' "prejudicial" preconditions and a lack of transparency by OA4P.

Two academics asked the university what prevented public disclosure of investments by the Oxford University Endowment Management (OUEM). The university's gazette responded that it had to comply with confidentiality agreements but had an Investment Policy Statement that prevented direct investments in arms that were illegal in the UK and indirect investments in some related funds.

On 5 June, according to Cherwell, the Vice-Chancellor, Irene Tracey, along with other administrators, responded to the request from OA4P for a meeting. According to the group, the university expressed "the desire to work with the students".

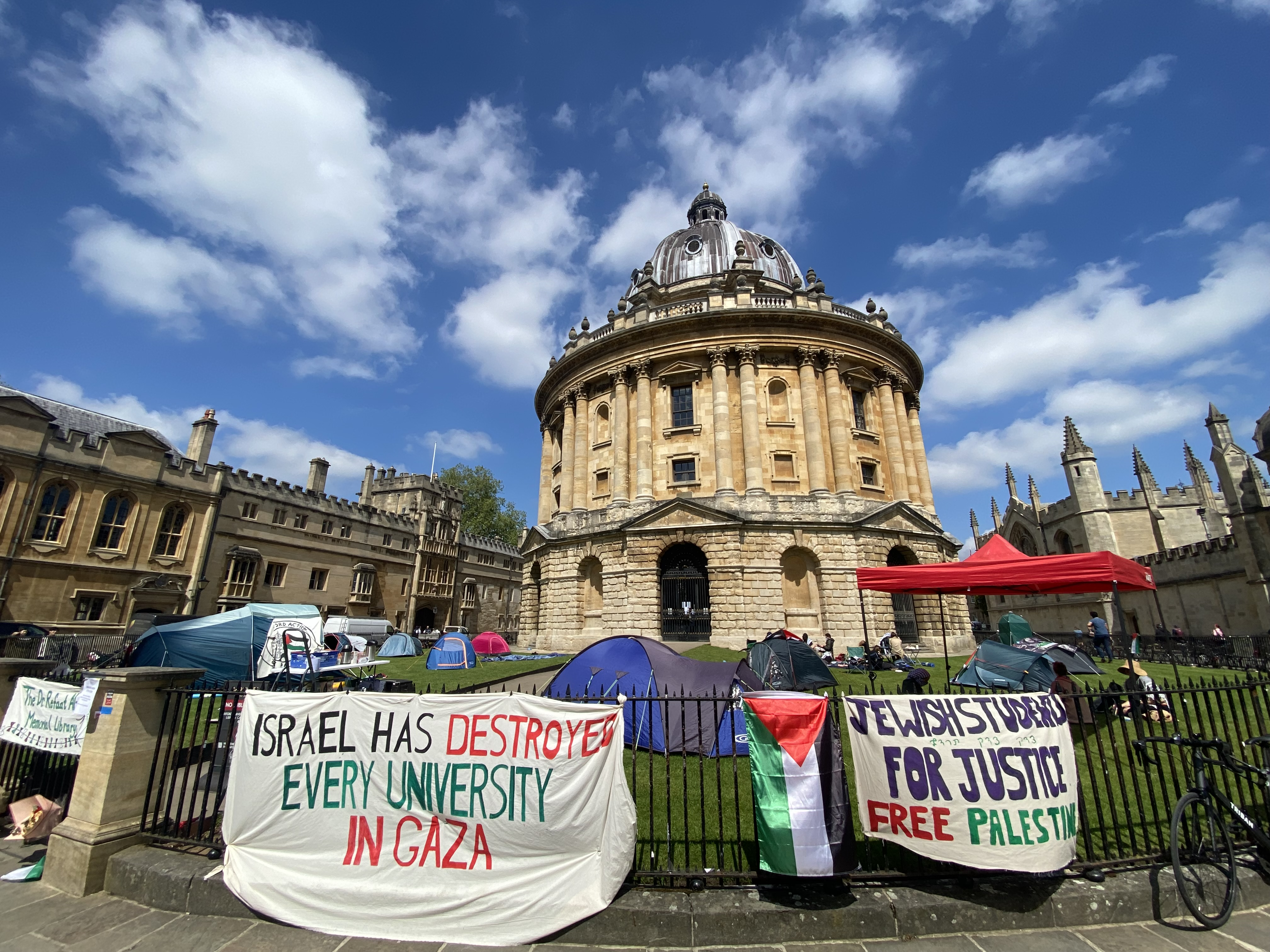
The second branch of the Oxford encampment, built on the Radcliffe Camera's lawn

== Encampments ==
On the morning of Monday 6 May 2024, the encampment started on the lawn of the Oxford University Museum of Natural History, through which the Pitt Rivers Museum is accessed, on Parks Road. The second encampment site was launched on 19 May 2024, outside the Radcliffe Camera on Radcliffe Square. The Bodleian Library responded by limiting access via the Gladstone Link.

The first day saw a turnout of 200 students, 50 of whom camped overnight. Within a week, 500 staff members had signed a letter of support; 2000 students signed a letter within the first two weeks. On 5 June, an activist counted 23 college Junior and Middle Common Rooms (JCRs and MCRs) that had passed motions supporting the encampments' demands. The university initially said that "peaceful protests" by staff and students were part of "freedom of expression", but that it aimed to minimise "impact on work, research and learning".

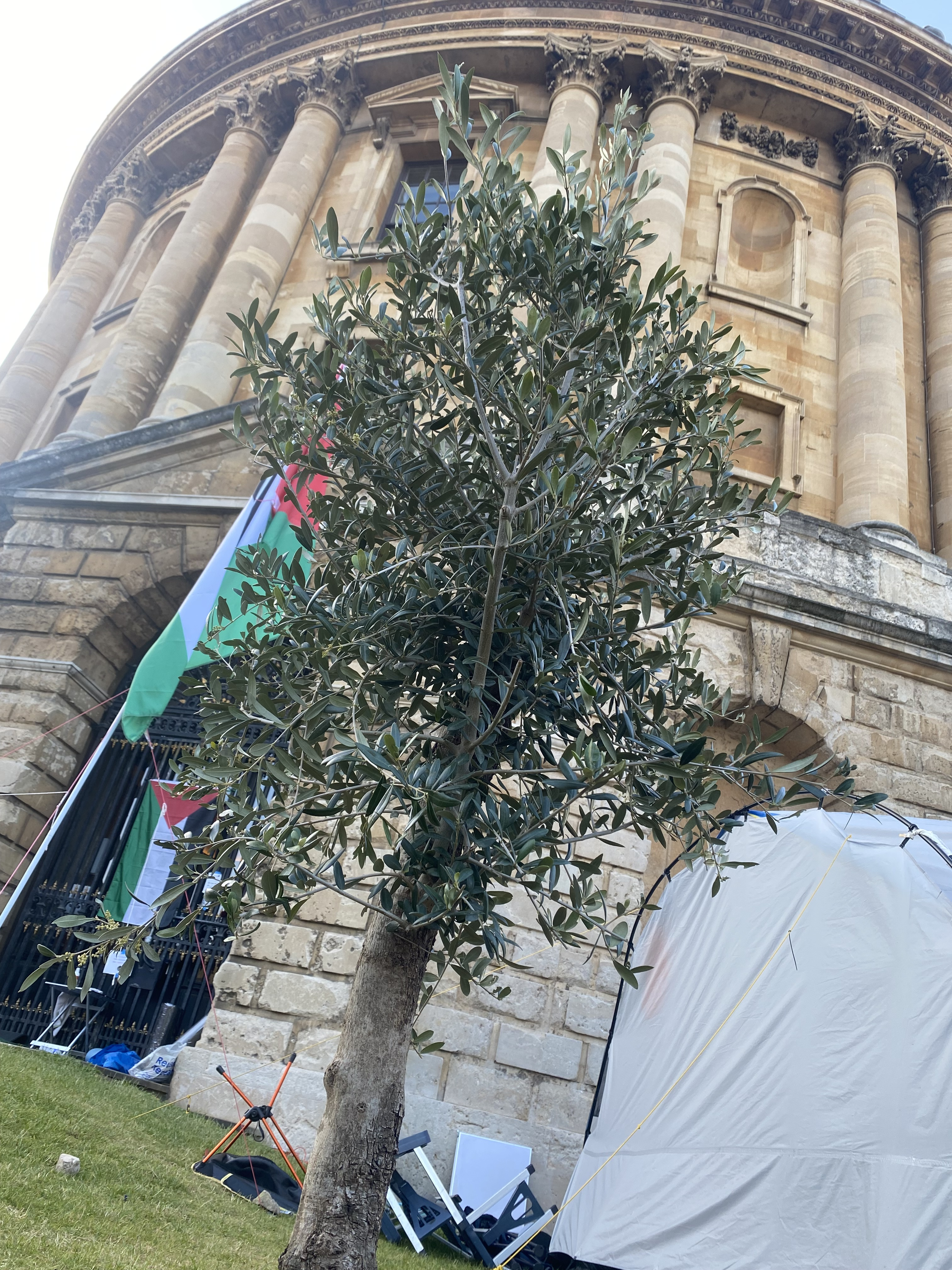
Olive tree planted by pro-Palestinian activists outside the Radcliffe Camera

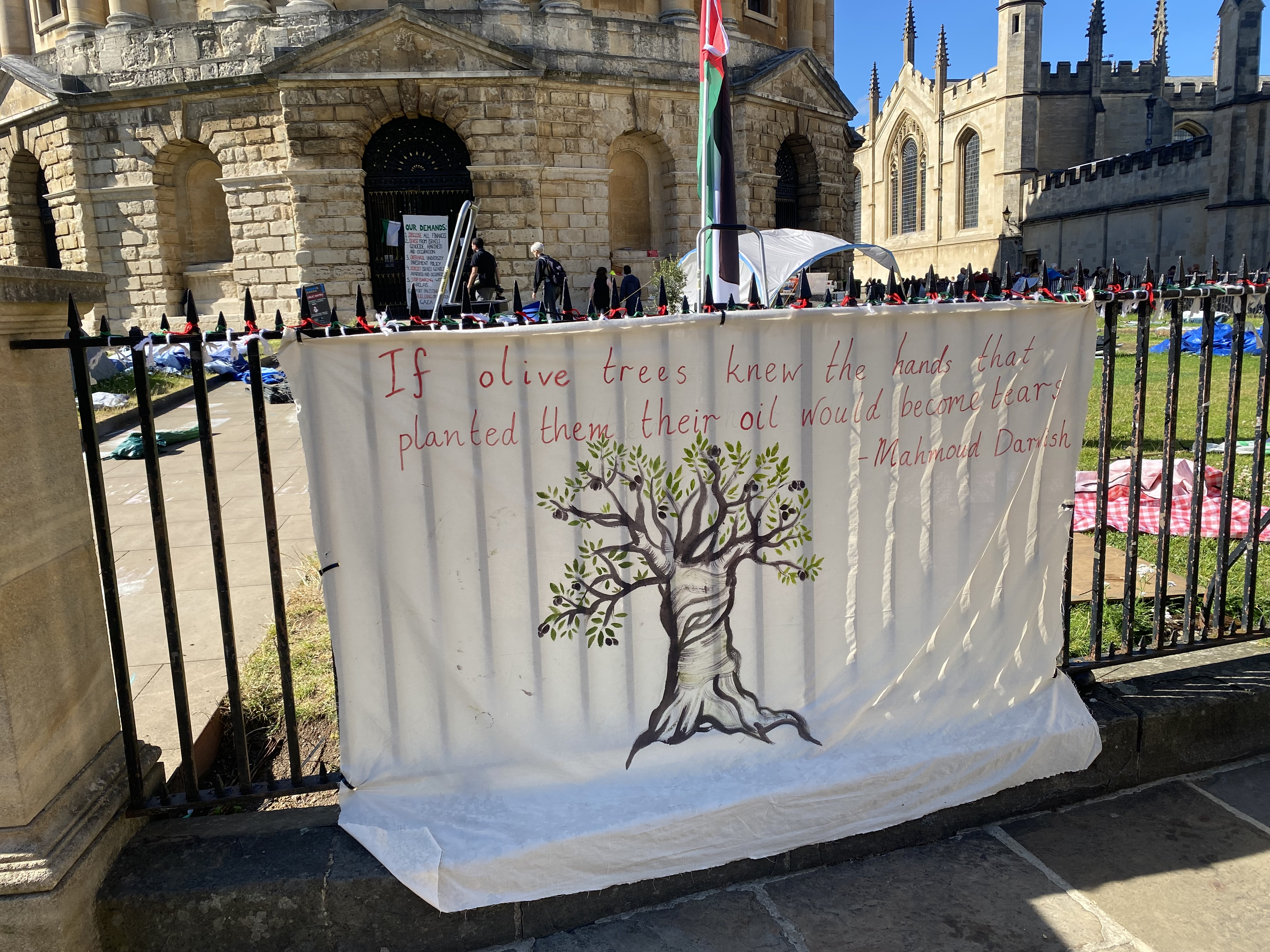
The encampment outside the Radcliffe Library, photographed on 7 July 2024

A Cherwell student journalist reported that students were busy on the first day with activities such as teach-in lectures, poetry readings and protest chants alongside completing academic work. Community donations provided resources for the encampment and hot food. With no hierarchical leadership and decisions made democratically, individuals volunteered for logistical tasks such as an overnight guard rota. The Dr Refaat Alareer Memorial Library tent held a diversity of books. The Dr Hammam Alloh medical tent collected supplies. Journalists were directed to the Shireen Abu Akleh media tent; students said a Daily Mail journalist circled the encampment unzipping tents after being denied an interview. Overnight sprinklers caused drainage issues and muddy conditions.

On 11 May, a daily evening vigil for those who died in Gaza was interrupted by pro-Israeli counter-protesters. According to OA4P and a freelance journalist at the scene, six men arrived by taxi and threatened violence, shouting hate speech, ripping down banners and targeting Jewish students with antisemitic language. The police were called to the scene but no arrests were made. A separate individual later slashed a banner at the encampment with a knife, according to one protester.

The encampment was visited by scholars including Amia Srinivasan and Avi Shlaim. Sharren Haskel visited to criticise the encampment; on another occasion, according to Tribune, Zionist Jews came to debate the protesters. According to The Jewish Chronicle, Ghassan Abu-Sittah and Tamim al-Barghouti were initially invited to the encampment. Shlaim spoke positively of the encampment to Yeni Şafak, rejecting the Prime Minister Rishi Sunak's claims that antisemitism on university campuses had risen and asserting that Islamophobia was a larger issue in Britain. Middle East Monitor reported that Friday prayers were held on the first week and that Jewish students were among the protesters.

On 19 May, a second encampment was established around the Radcliffe Camera, after the university refused to accept the protesters' demands. According to protesters affiliated with OA4P, they would dismantle the encampment if the university entered into negotiations over key demands. Later the same day 250–500 protesters rallied around the new encampment, as part of an escalation of previous protests, with the intention to disrupt university proceedings.

On 23 May, the university said that some protesters "have created a deeply intimidating environment" for Jewish people. Twelve Jewish faculty released an open letter on 27 May that contested the statement and supported the student protests.

The first encampment, outside the Museum of Natural History, was abandoned on 25 June, after the university erected fences to prevent people and goods from entering the encampment site on 23 June. The second encampment, in and around the Radcliffe Camera, was disbanded on 8 July following threats of legal action.

On 24 January 2025, 13 protesters briefly re-occupied the Radcliffe Camera. The protesters occupied the building from around 9:00 a.m. to 3:45 p.m., when they were arrested by police.

== Related protests ==
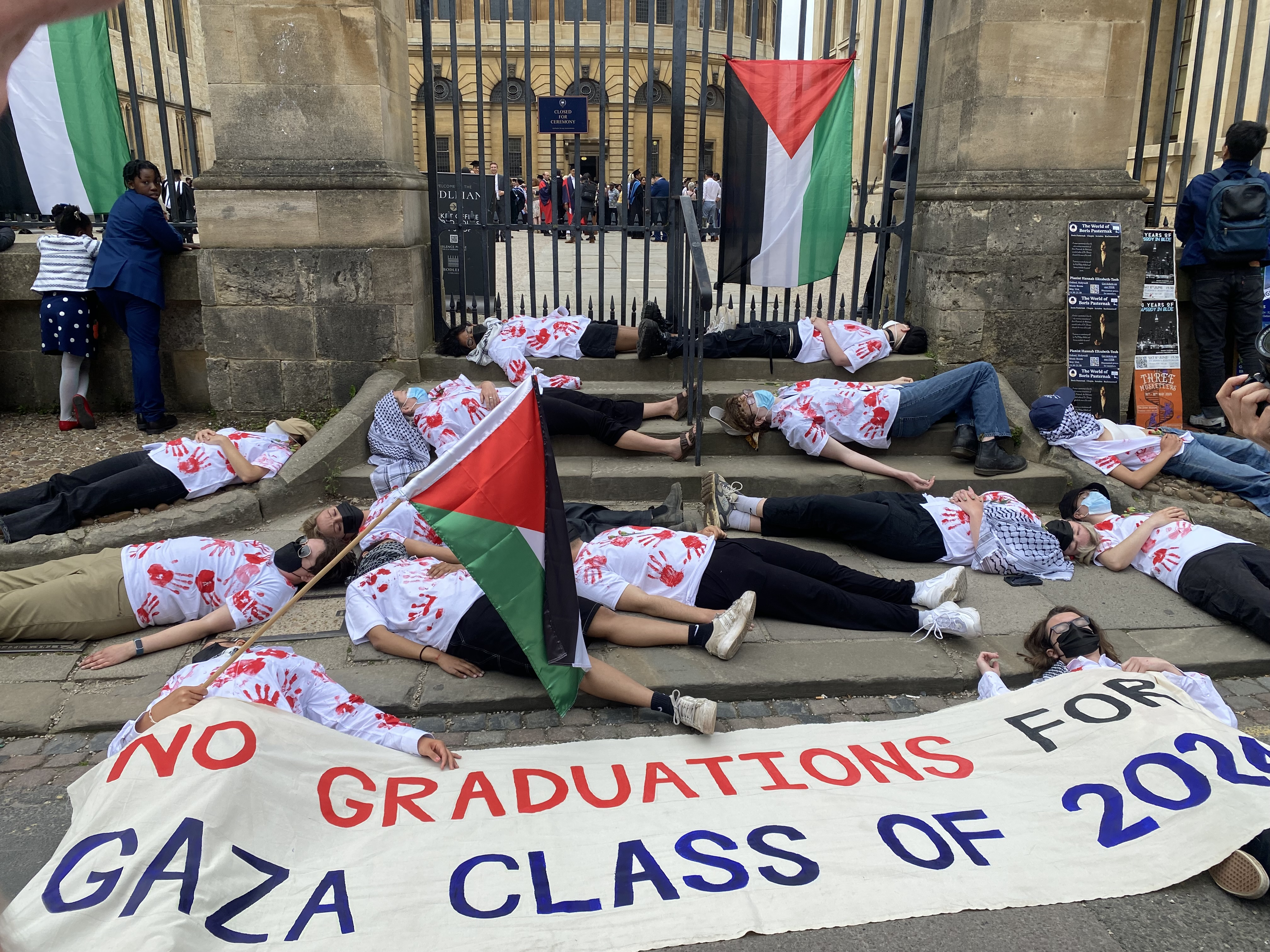
Students hold a die-in protest at an Oxford University graduation ceremony, May 2024

On 18 May, around 50 students disrupted a graduation ceremony at the Sheldonian Theatre with a "die-in" protest. They wore academic dress stained with fake blood. According to OA4P, university security kicked students and shut doors on their heads.

On 23 May, protesters occupied the office building of Vice-Chancellor Irene Tracey, overlooking Wellington Square, hanging a Palestinian flag and list of demands out of an office window. Thames Valley Police made an initial 16 arrests on suspicion of aggravated trespass, and one on suspicion of common assault, after the university authorities called the police. A 17th arrest was later made. The university reported that at least 12 of those arrested were current students. According to a protester, they agreed to leave when police said they would be arrested if they did not, but they were arrested anyway. They were released on conditional bail that night.

Hundreds of protesters gathered at the scene for three hours, some of whom attempted to block the police van that carried the arrested students. Chants included "forty thousand people dead / you're arresting kids instead". One organiser said that police broke a student's glasses, gave another student a concussion and knocked over an elderly lady. A statement by protesters said the university "would rather arrest, silence, and physically assault its own students than confront its enabling of Israel's genocide in Gaza".

After the arrests, the university stated that "a faction of students and faculty ... have not been interested in dialogue in good faith" and that the protest was a "violent action" that "included forcibly overpowering the receptionist". Three Oxford Community Independent councillors expressed opposition to the arrests and support to those protesting.

On 13 June, protesters occupied a wing of the Examination Schools and renamed it Dahshan School after the academic Saeed Dahshan, causing the university to cancel some end-of-year exams. According the OA4P, the occupation was unaffiliated with the group and its encampments, but said that it was "a reflection of the mounting frustration". The university said the action "plainly goes beyond the bounds of acceptable protest".

== See also ==
- List of Gaza war protests at universities in 2024
