= 2024 University of Oregon pro-Palestinian campus occupation =

Demonstration in Eugene, Oregon, U.S.

- Part of Gaza war protests (in the US • at universities (in 2024 (in the US)))
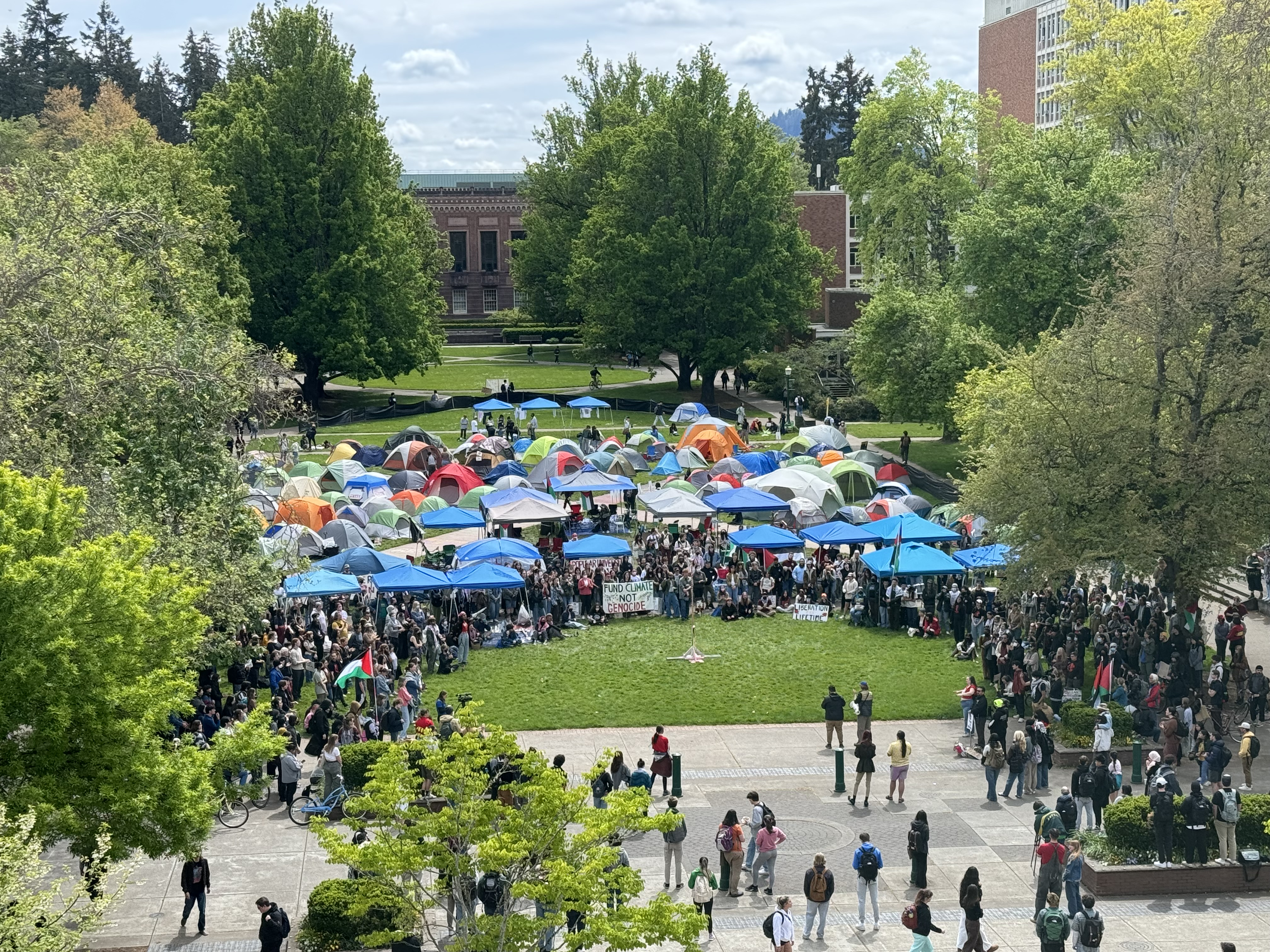
- The University of Oregon encampment on May 1, 2024
- Date: April 29 – May 23, 2024 (24 days)
- Location: University of Oregon, Eugene, Oregon, U.S.

On April 29, 2024, approximately 100 University of Oregon students established a camp on the Eugene campus to support Palestinians in Gaza and demanding action from administrators. As part of the 2024 pro-Palestinian protests on university campuses, demonstrators requested for the university to divest from “the state of Israel, Israeli companies, and any weapons or surveillance manufacturing.”

== Background ==
By May 6, 2024, student protests had occurred in 45 of the 50 states in the United States and the District of Columbia, with encampments, occupations, walkouts or sit-ins on almost 140 campuses. Thirty-four encampments were established in the United Kingdom; across universities in Australia, beginning with the University of Sydney; and in Canada, including an encampment at McGill University. On May 7, protests spread further on European campuses after mass arrests at the University of Amsterdam campus occupation, including occupation of campus buildings at Leipzig University in Germany, Sciences Po in France, and Ghent University in Belgium. By May 8, protests had taken place in more than 25 countries, and on May 13, approximately 1,000 Dutch students and university staff took part in a national walk-out.

== Timeline ==
=== May 1 ===
On May 1, the University of Oregon president, Karl Scholz, made a statement regarding the encampment. While explicitly supporting the student right to protest and exchange ideas, he criticized protester demands for divestment as having a "performative aspect." Despite this, 74 university faculty and staff have signed an open letter in support of the encampment.

=== May 5–6 ===
By May 5, the encampment had grown to nearly 150 tents. On the afternoon of May 6, encampment spokespersons alleged that they had received a letter from university administrators threatening to revoke academic amnesty from protesters should the camp remain the following day at noon. This came amidst complaints from some Jewish students among whom the encampment had caused discomfort. In response to this, one protester stated that the demonstration calls for formal protection for Jewish students, and that Jewish student-represented organizations such as Jewish Voice for Peace have helped in setting up the encampment.

=== May 15–16 ===
On May 15, the first criminal charge in relation to the occupation was handed to a student protestor for applying posters to campus buildings. On May 16, the encampment relocated to Johnson Hall and a total of 17 meetings were held between the protestors and various representatives and negotiation teams from the university.

=== May 22 ===
On May 22, the protestors came to an agreement with the University of Oregon negotiation team. This agreement included the end of Sabra Hummus sales on campus, a new Middle Eastern North African cultural space on campus, new initiatives to expand opportunities for Palestinian scholars to study at University of Oregon, the creation of the UO Senate Working Group on Ethical Investment, Purchasing & Contracting, and a ceasefire statement to be made by President John Karl Scholz.

== See also ==
- 2024 Portland State University pro-Palestinian campus occupation
- List of pro-Palestinian protests on university campuses in the United States in 2024
