= 2024 University of Twente pro-Palestinian campus protests =

Demonstration in Enschede, Netherlands

- Part of Gaza war protests (at universities (in 2024 (in the Netherlands)))
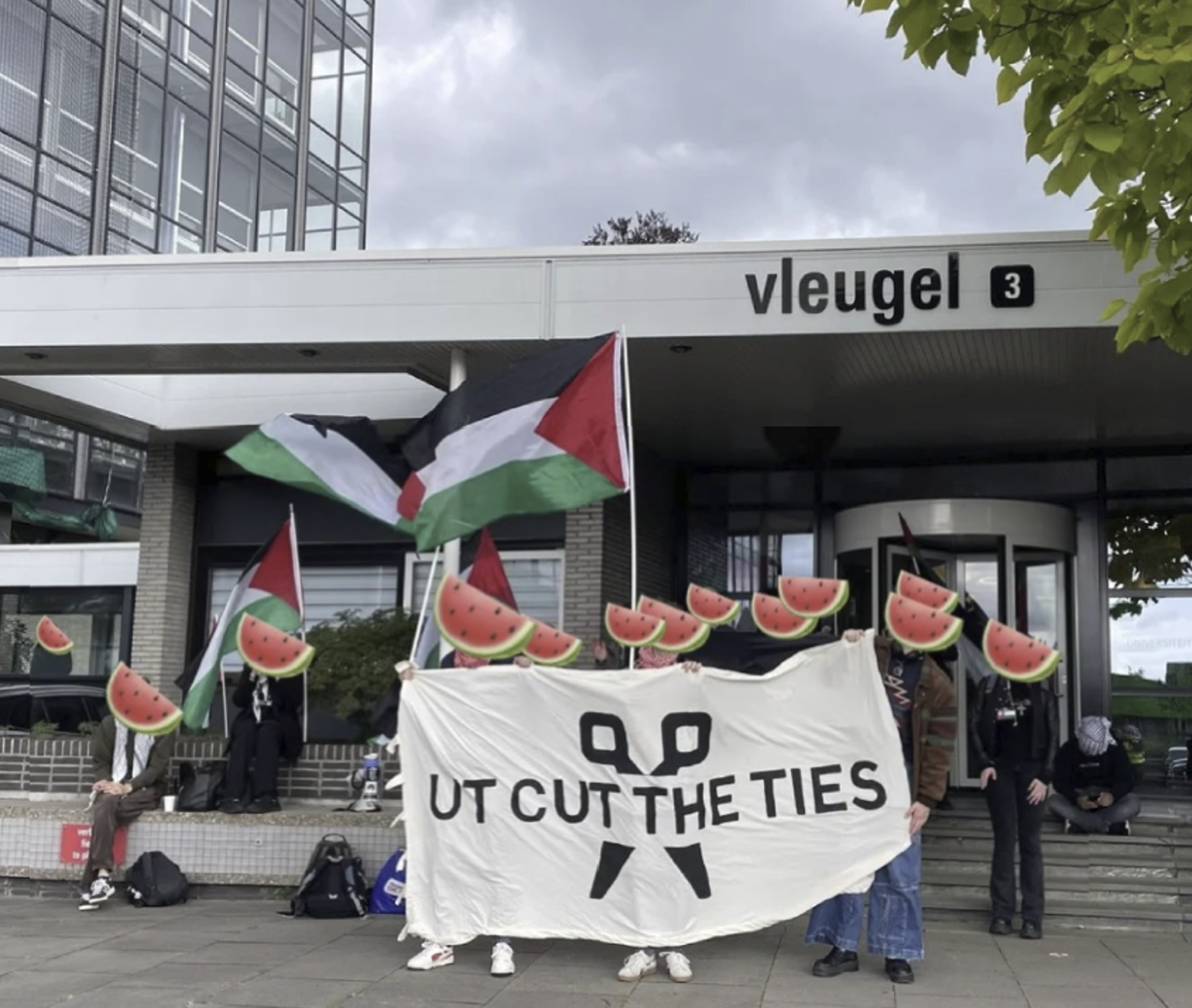
- Protesters stand with a banner reading "UT Cut the ties" outside the University of Twente administrative building (Vleugel), 12 June 2024.
- Date: May 2024 – October 2024
- Location: University of Twente, Enschede, Netherlands.
- Methods: Protests; walkouts; occupations; sit-ins

In May 2024, University of Twente students and staff organized a series of pro-Palestinian protests on campus and in the city center to support Palestinians in Gaza and demand action from the university.

== Background ==
=== Campus protests in the Netherlands ===
On May 6, 2024, pro-Palestinian protests broke out at the University of Amsterdam which quickly spread to other universities in the Randstad and the rest of the Netherlands. Although protests had been taking place as early as October 2023, which marks the start of the Gaza war, the protests intensified in May in the light of the Rafah offensive on May 6 and recent similar protests in the United States and elsewhere.

=== Worldwide campus protests ===
Encampments were established at 36 institutions in the United Kingdom, including 21 of the 24 institutions in the Russell Group, with some institutions having more than one encampment; across universities in Australia, beginning with the University of Sydney; and in Canada, including an encampment at McGill University. On May 7, protests spread further on European campuses after mass arrests at the University of Amsterdam campus occupation, including occupation of campus buildings at Leipzig University in Germany, Sciences Po in France, and Ghent University in Belgium. As of May 8, protests have taken place in more than 25 countries. On May 13, approximately 1,000 Dutch students and university staff took part in a national walk-out.

== Timeline ==
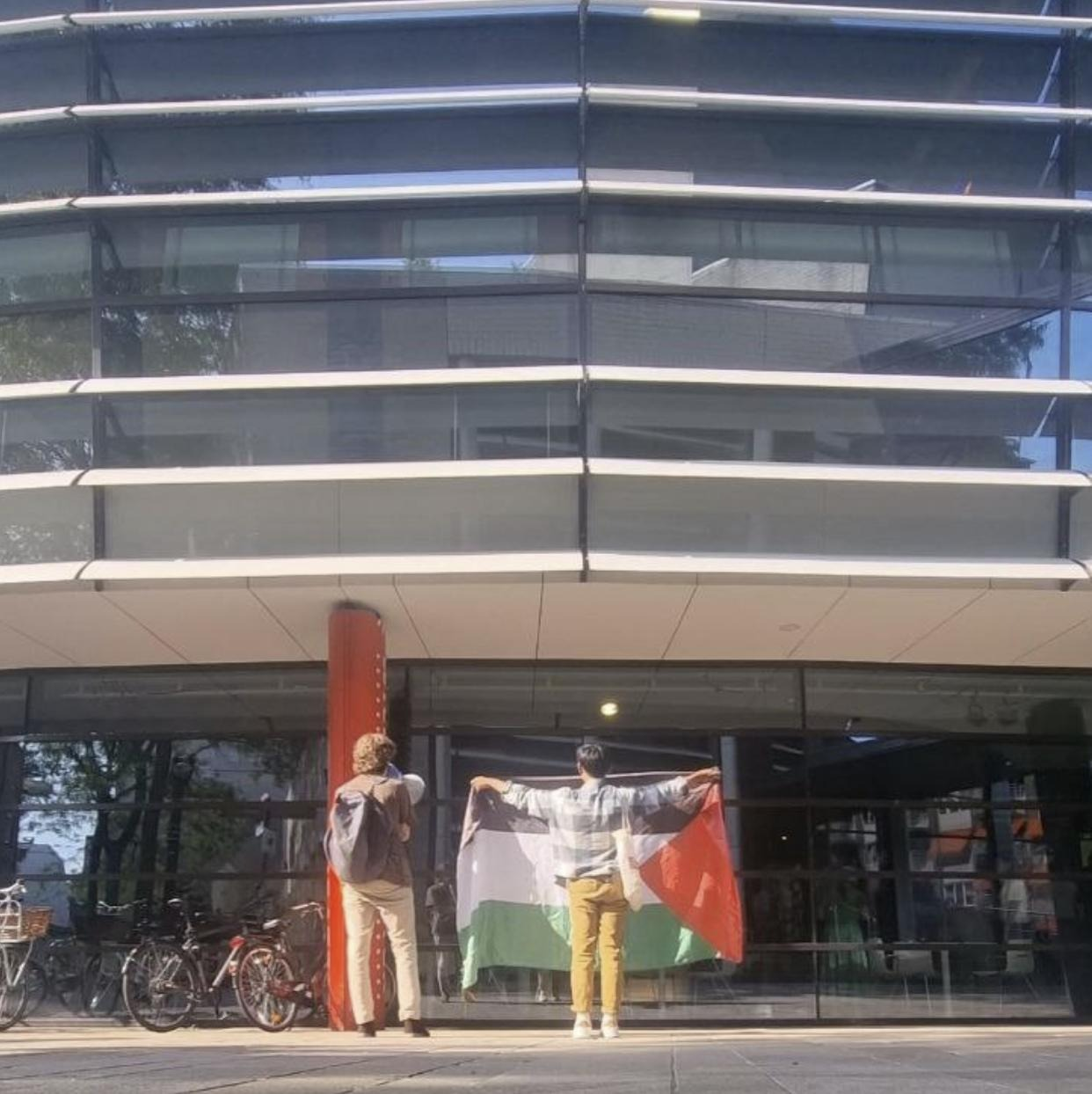
Protestors removed after disrupting the opening of the academic year continue their protest outside the venue (Wilminktheater), 2 September 2024

On 13 May, Enschede Students for Palestine delivered an open letter signed by 603 people to the Executive Board, calling for disclosure of ties, ending all ties, divestment, supporting Palestinian students and staff in the university, and creating fellowships and scholarships for students and academics in Palestine, and partnerships with Palestinian universities. This began several dialogue sessions and between the Enschede Students for Palestine and the Executive Board, with the Board ultimately refusing to cut any ties.

On 24 May, the action group disrupted the Dies Natalis, interrupting twice the secretary-general at the Ministry of Infrastructure and Water Management's keynote speech. Subsequently, students and staff began a series of daily protest marches through the university.

On 12 June, activists occupied the Vleugel administration building, where the Executive Board offices are, in response to the "unproductive talks" with the Board. The occupation lasted for several hours. Even though police was present, protesters ended up disbanding on their own.

On 2 September, during the opening of the academic year, the action group disrupted the keynote speech by Jos Benschop, vice-chairman of ASML, protesting the universities ties and ASML's alleged involvement in links to Israel. The protesters were physically removed by security.

Throughout the year, the action group also held multiple demonstrations and sit-ins at the Enschede train station.

== Reactions ==
Spokespersons of the Executive Board defended the right for students to demonstrate on campus and was in contact with the organizers of the protests. The Board claimed that the collaborations of the university are in part determined by which countries are sanctioned or not, but that decisions to cut ties on ethic grounds would be explored "in the coming period".

== See also ==
- 2024 pro-Palestinian protests on university campuses
- 2024 pro-Palestinian protests on university campuses in the Netherlands
- 2024 Utrecht University pro-Palestinian campus occupation
- 2024 Radboud University Nijmegen pro-Palestinian campus occupation
- 2025 pro-Palestinian protests on university campuses in the Netherlands
- List of pro-Palestinian protests in the Netherlands
