= List of Gaza war protests at universities in the Netherlands in 2024 =

Dutch Gaza war protests at universities
- in 2024 in 2025 → Part of Gaza war protests (at universities (in 2024))
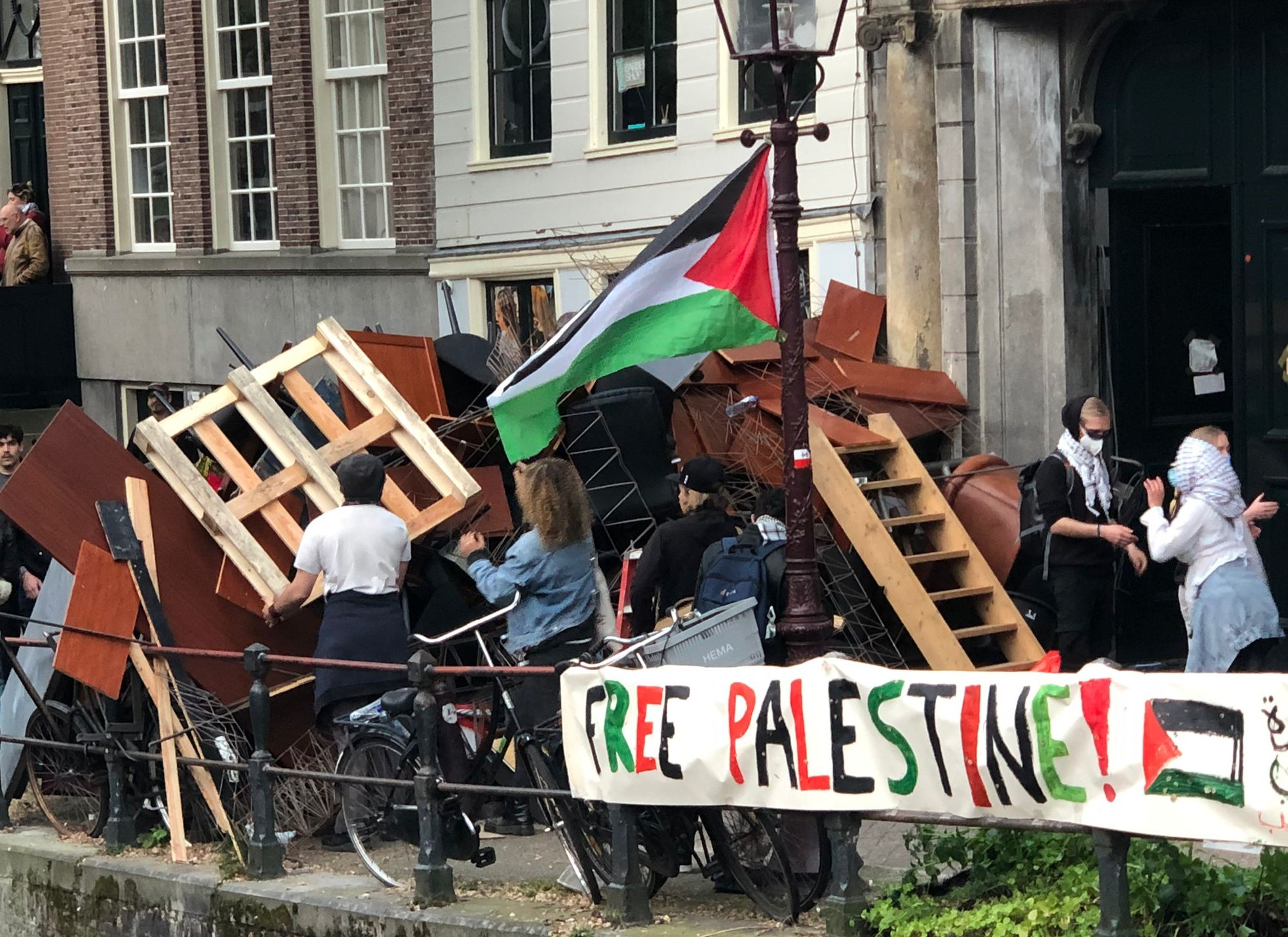
- Protesters reinforcing a barricade at University of Amsterdam, May 7
- Date: May 6, 2024 – June 5, 2024 (4 weeks and 2 days)
- Location: Universities throughout the Netherlands
- Caused by: Israeli invasion of Gaza and Dutch university ties with Israeli organisations
- Goals: A clear stance from universities against the "genocidal nature" of the Israeli attacks on Gaza; Divestment from Israel; Academic boycott of Israel; Transparency about collaborations with Israeli organisations
- Methods: Protests; political demonstrations; student activism; walkouts; occupations; sit-ins; hunger strikes; teach-ins
- Result: Various universities release statements and lists regarding colloborations with Israeli organisations; A few institutions freeze or terminate ties and programmes with Israeli organisations; Universiteiten van Nederland implements a new demonstration protocol

Casualties
- Injuries: 14+ (Note: Although the municipal parties of GroenLinks, PvdA and D66 in Amsterdam have asked for clarification about the number of injured protesters and bystanders and despite various media reports and injuries, it is unknown how many more protesters may have been injured. The number of injuries includes at least 1 protester and 1 police officer during the night between May 6 and 7, and 2 protesters and 5 officers on May 8. All of these injuries took place during the protests at the University of Amsterdam. Additionally, by May 20, the health of one of the hunger strikers at Maastricht University had declined significantly, and four others had to stop later as well due to physical problems.)
- Arrested: 352+ (Note: The number of arrests in Amsterdam includes 169 in the night between 6 and 7 May, 36 on 8 May, 3 on 9 May, 1 on 13 May and 1 on 17 May.; 50 arrests were made in Utrecht on 7 May, 3 on 8 May and 42 on 15 May.; 2 people were arrested at the Radboud University Nijmegen on May 27.; Over 15 people were arrested in Delft on June 3, when police cleared a building students attempted to occupy.; On June 4, about 30 protesters were arrested during a protest at an Universiteiten van Nederland building in The Hague.)
- Damage: at least €1.5 million (Note: This estimate number only includes damage to property of the University of Amsterdam during the first week of protests. The number does not include damage caused to municipal property and to neighboring companies and individuals. Damage at Utrecht University was said to be "limited" by the university.)
- Detained: 3 (Note: One British protester was charged with openlijke geweldpleging ("public violence") against the police and sentenced to two months of prison, of which one month suspended.; A Spanish protester was charged with violence as well as threats against the police, and was also sentenced to one month of prison, as well as paying €350 in damages.; A Palestinian protester was charged with destruction of property and resisting arrest, and sentenced to two months of prison, of which one month suspended.; Additionally, a fourth protester was sentenced to 60 hours of community service, of which 30 hours suspended.)
- Charged: 11 (Note: Ten people were charged for the first protest at the University of Amsterdam, and one for a later protest also at this university.)

On May 6, 2024, pro-Palestinian protests broke out at the University of Amsterdam which quickly spread to other universities in the Randstad and the rest of the Netherlands. Although protests had been taking place as early as October 2023, which marks the start of the Gaza war, the protests intensified in May in the light of the Rafah offensive on May 6 and recent similar protests in the United States and elsewhere.

== Background ==
=== Escalation of protests ===
By May 6, 2024, student protests had occurred in 45 of the 50 states in the United States and the District of Columbia, with encampments, occupations, walkouts or sit-ins on almost 140 campuses. Thirty-four encampments were established in the United Kingdom; across universities in Australia, beginning with the University of Sydney; and in Canada, including an encampment at McGill University. On May 7, protests spread further on European campuses after mass arrests at the University of Amsterdam campus occupation, including occupation of campus buildings at Leipzig University in Germany, Sciences Po in France, and Ghent University in Belgium. By May 8, protests had taken place in more than 25 countries, and on May 13, approximately 1,000 Dutch students and university staff took part in a national walk-out.

=== List of protests ===
Encampments were established at 36 institutions in the United Kingdom, including 21 of the 24 institutions in the Russell Group, with some institutions having more than one encampment; across universities in Australia, beginning with the University of Sydney; and in Canada, including an encampment at McGill University. On May 7, protests spread further on European campuses after mass arrests at the University of Amsterdam campus occupation, including occupation of campus buildings at Leipzig University in Germany, Sciences Po in France, and Ghent University in Belgium. As of May 8, protests have taken place in more than 25 countries. On May 13, approximately 1,000 Dutch students and university staff took part in a national walk-out.

== Timeline ==
=== Early protests ===
An early protest occurred at Radboud University Nijmegen on 18 October, by students demanding the university cuts all ties with Israeli institutes. A teach-in was held at Leiden University on 9 November 2023. Student protesters demanding the university cut all ties with Israeli organisations protested at Delft University of Technology on 29 November 2023. Other demonstrations followed at Utrecht University in December 2023 and January 2024. Protests were also held at the campuses of the Vrije Universiteit Amsterdam, Maastricht University, Erasmus University Rotterdam, Tilburg University, and the University of Groningen. 17 arrests were made during four days of protests at the Amsterdam University College. It was noted, however, that most protests at university campuses in the Netherlands were peaceful and without police intervention.

=== Escalation ===
==== University of Amsterdam ====
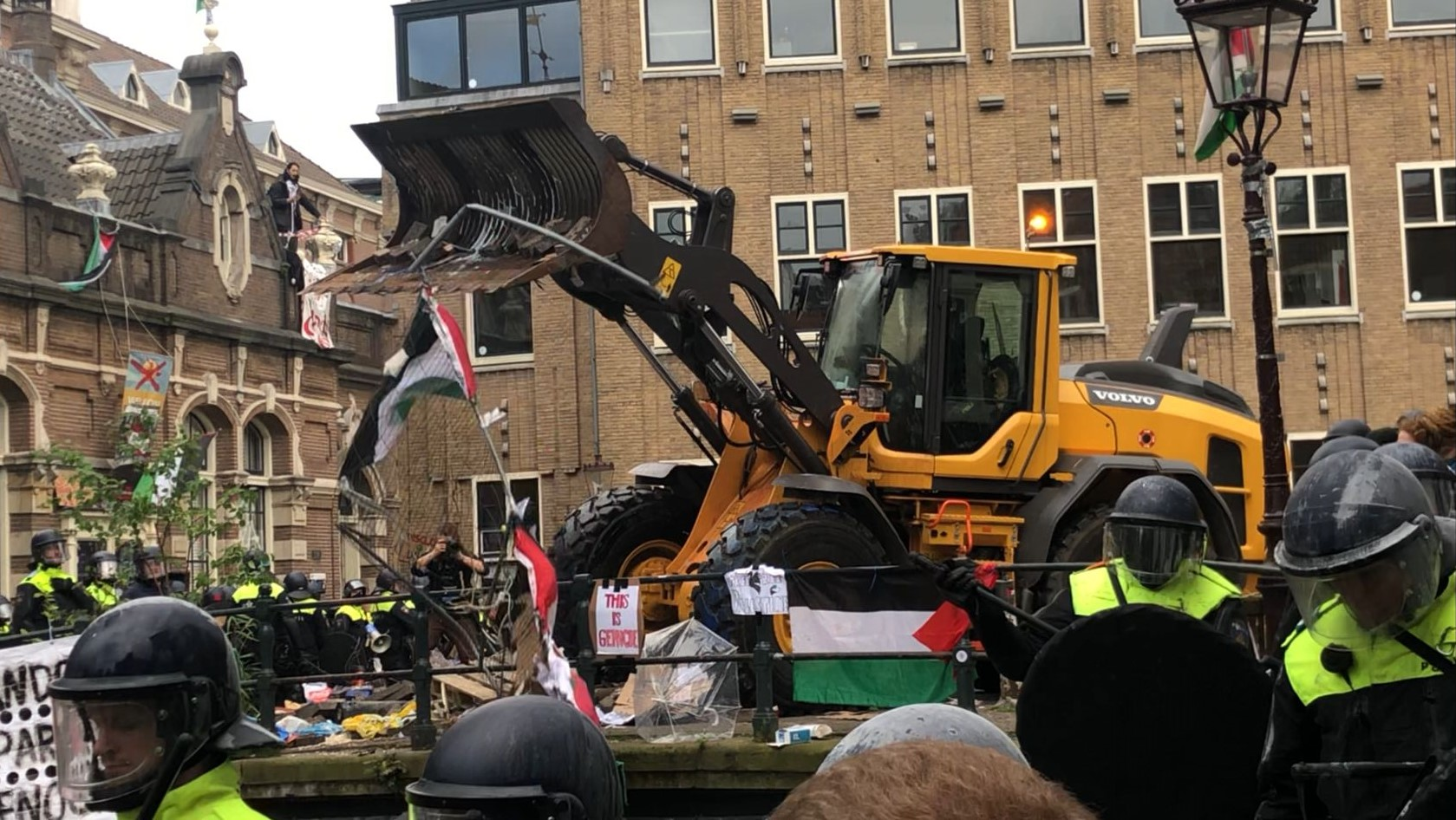
Bulldozer demolishing a barricade at the University of Amsterdam, May 7

On May 6, hundreds of students started a solidarity encampment at the University of Amsterdam (UvA). The next day, police cleared the encampment, arresting 169 people. Over a thousand people protested at a pro-Palestine demonstration in Amsterdam in response. On May 8, new protests emerged in Amsterdam, starting in and around university buildings and later moving to the Rokin. 36 people were arrested by the end of the night. The following day, another protest was organised which again started at the Roeterseiland university campus of University of Amsterdam. Thousands of protesters went on to march through the city. Three protesters were arrested by the police. The UvA decided to close various campus buildings for the rest of the week.

On May 13, after a national walk-out, students occupied campus buildings at the University of Amsterdam. Police in riot gear subsequently ended the protests in Amsterdam after "chasing away hundreds" of people, and the university closed for two days after the renewed occupations on campus. The Amsterdam protest continued at Oosterpark. The UvA filed complaints against several protesters. One protester was arrested; a criminal investigation was ongoing to determine if more arrests would follow.

==== Radboud University Nijmegen ====
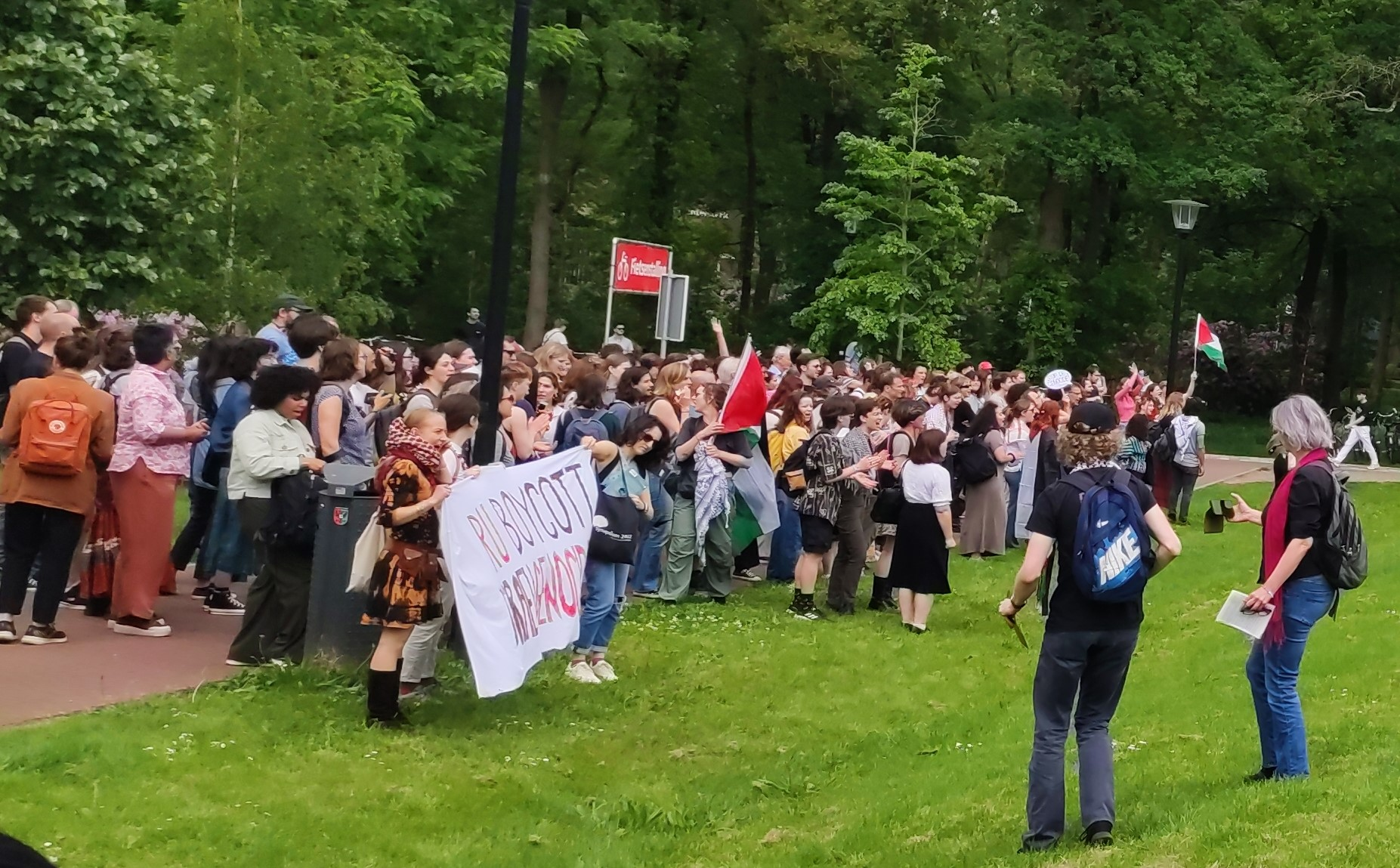
Protesters at Radboud University Nijmegen, May 14, 2024

The pro-Palestinian campus occupations at Radboud University Nijmegen in the Netherlands were a series of occupation protests, as part of the broader Gaza war protests. On 13 May 2024 protesters created an encampment, similar to other campus protests in the Netherlands, the United States and other countries. On 20 May a second encampment was established next to the universities' administrative building. On 5 June after the occupation of another university building, police cleared the encampment. The protesters demanded that the university board divest from Israel over its alleged genocide of Palestinians and invasion of the Gaza Strip, and to support Palestinian students and universities. The protests included walkouts, daily marches, temporary occupations, as well as vandalism.

==== Utrecht University ====
On May 7, protests took place at Utrecht University. An encampment was attempted at the academic library of Utrecht, where 50 people were arrested in the night between May 7 and May 8.

On May 8, a new encampment at Utrecht University was set up, which was cleared during the early morning of 9 May. Three people, who were protesting outside the occupied building, were arrested during this protest. The university decided to close its buildings until Monday May 13. The next day, a smaller protest was also held around university buildings of Utrecht University.

==== University of Twente ====
On 24 May, protesters disrupted the Dies Natalis at the University of Twente, interrupting twice the secretary-general at the Ministry of Infrastructure and Water Management's keynote speech. Subsequently, students and staff began a series of daily protest marches through the university.

On 12 June, activists occupied the Vleugel administration building, where the Executive Board offices are, in response to the "unproductive talks" with the Board. The occupation lasted for several hours, with protesters disbanding on their own.

On 2 September, during the opening of the academic year, protesters disrupted the keynote speech by Jos Benschop, vice-chairman of ASML, protesting the universities ties and ASML's alleged involvement in links to Israel. The protesters were physically removed by security.

Throughout the year, students from the university also organised and held a pro-Palestine demonstrations at Enschede railway station.

==== Protests at other universities ====
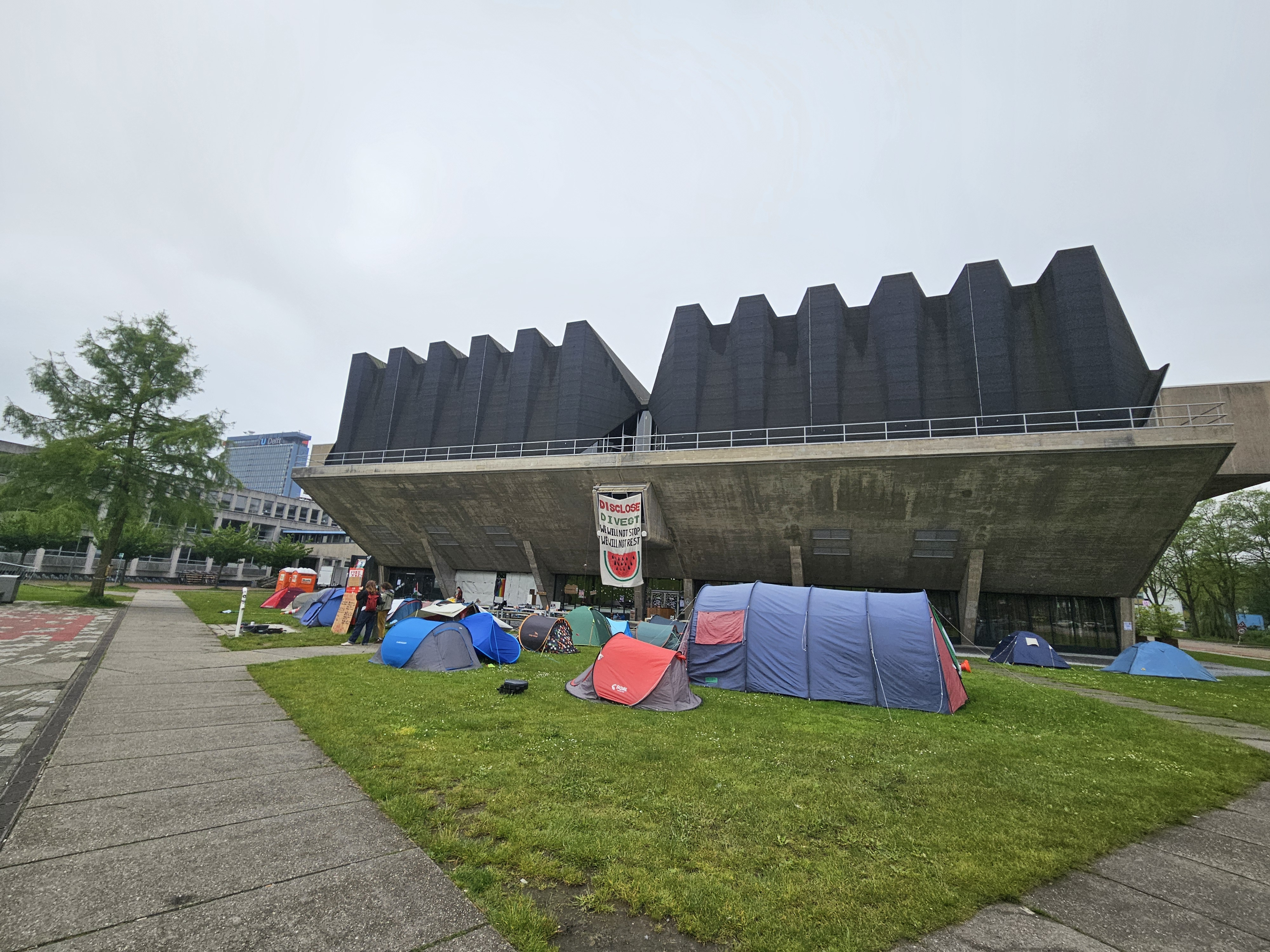
Encampment at the auditorium of TU Delft, June 2024

On May 7, protests and in-campus encampments took place at the Delft University of Technology.

On May 13, approximately one thousand students and staff took part in a national walk-out. University buildings at the universities of Amsterdam and Groningen were also occupied. Protests, some of which taking place next to tent encampments, also took place at the campuses of Radboud University Nijmegen, Maastricht University, Eindhoven University of Technology, Delft University of Technology, Utrecht University, Leiden University (both in Leiden and The Hague), Erasmus University Rotterdam and Wageningen University & Research, as well as other campuses. An area at the Faculty of Arts and Social Sciences of Maastricht University was renamed "Rafah Garden".

On May 14, a protest was held at the University of Humanistic Studies. Students at the Eindhoven University of Technology held a cacerolazo during the European Innovation Debate, a debate between Dutch candidates for the 2024 European Parliament election. While there were no other renewed student protests on university campuses, several encampments from the day before were still standing, such as in Groningen, Maastricht and at Radboud University.

On May 15 a Utrecht University building was occupied by pro-Palestine protesters. The university decided to close various other buildings as precaution. Protesters were removed from the building in the early night by the police and 42 people were arrested. Also on May 15, six student activists from Maastricht University announced to be going into hunger strike until their demands were met. Students had been protesting at the university campus for three days by then.

As protests were announced for May 16, the Erasmus University Rotterdam decided earlier that week to close its buildings that day. The protest was moved to Rotterdam Centraal station. At the Campus The Hague of Leiden University, students occupied a floor. The occupation lasted a few hours. A few hundred students at Tilburg University held a peaceful protest march across campus.

On May 17, students protested at the Academiegebouw of Leiden University and set up a tent encampment. Two buildings were closed as a precaution. Students and staff members of the Vrije Universiteit Amsterdam held a protest at their university campus square. A sit-in was held at Wageningen University & Research and another protest was held at the University of Humanistic Studies.

While there were little to no renewed protests during the Pentecost weekend (a public holiday in the Netherlands), the tent encampments on the campuses of the universities of Groningen, Wageningen, Maastricht and at Radboud University were still standing by May 22.

A pro-Palestinian student protest was held during the lustrum celebration of the University of Groningen on May 21. The same day, an ultimatum from students and staff members to Tilburg University ended. If the university did not meet the protesters' demands, they would set up a tent encampment the next day. Student activist groups, as well as some other Palestinian solidarity groups, published a joint open letter in which they declare solidarity with each other, forming a "national coalition", and in which they reject any type of compromise with universities.

A university building of the Faculty of Arts and Social Sciences at Maastricht University was occupied by students on May 22. The university filed complaints against activists who had defaced university buildings with graffiti over the weekend. During the evening hours, the occupation was ended and the activists abandoned the tent encampment. According to the protesters, this was done under the threat of mass arrests. The same day, an academic conference at Wageningen University & Research was disturbed repeatedly by pro-Palestinian protesters. A tent encampment was set up at Tilburg University, after an ultimatum had passed the day before.

On May 23, a small student protest was held at Erasmus University Rotterdam. The same day, an encampment was set up on the roof of the academic library of the Delft University of Technology. The protesters said to only leave when their demands would be met. In the late night, the remaining hunger strikers at Maastricht University ceased their strike, in part due to physical problems.

A protest march was held at Tilburg University on May 24. Both students and staff members joined the protest.

On May 27, 78 staff members of Tilburg University published an open letter to the Deans and Board of Tilburg University, calling for an academic boycott of Israeli universities and corporations that are complicit in apartheid, occupation, persecution of the Palestinian people, and the violation of international law. In the night between 27 and 28 May, several buildings at Maastricht University were graffitied on with pro-Palestinian slogans. Students at Wageningen University & Research also held multiple protests.

On May 28, a die-in was held at Tilburg University.

On May 30, a tent encampment was set up by students at Erasmus University Rotterdam. The encampment and protests lasted until 9 June when, after threat of intervention by riot police, the activists left voluntarily. The university said that it would not terminate any of the collaborations with Israeli institutes unless forced by the government. New protests were held at the academic library of Utrecht University.

On June 2, a pro-Palestinian student protest was held near buildings of Utrecht University.

On June 3, students at the Delft University of Technology attempted to occupy a building, which was prevented by police. Over 15 students were arrested. A tent encampment was set up at the Vrije Universiteit Amsterdam.

On June 4, students at Tilburg University attempted to occupy the rector magnificus' office. Students had been protesting for two weeks at that point, organizing multiple events and actions, which were increasingly escalating. A building of the Universiteiten van Nederland in The Hague was occupied that day also. All activists, a group consisting of about thirty people, were arrested by the police.

On June 5, a student protest was held at the Fontys School of Fine and Performing Arts, to which Tilburg University students were also invited. Protests were also held at Wageningen University & Research.

== Response ==
=== Political response ===
The protests were condemned by Prime Minister Mark Rutte, as well as by various other high-ranking Dutch politicians. Mariëlle Paul, the Dutch Minister for Primary and Secondary Education, suggested several times that it is "very questionable" whether the "rioters are actually students".

An "emergency debate" was called on 10 May by the Government of Amsterdam in response to the police intervention earlier during the first protest on 6 May. Despite criticism, mayor Femke Halsema stood by her decision to let police intervene during the demonstration. Around 250 protesters demonstrated during the meeting outside the Stopera, where the meeting was held, dubbing this the "fifth day of student protests".

On 11 May, the "sixth day of protests", a pro-Palestine protest in Amsterdam attracted over 10,000 people. Many demonstrators denounced the police action earlier that week. Some protesters also called for Halsema to resign. On May 30, Halsema participated in a Room for Discussion event, where she spoke with students of the University of Amsterdam, and where she again stood by her decisions. The response from participating students was predominantly negative.

The Dutch Student Union declared its solidarity with the student movement, and was critical regarding the treatment of student protesters by police. The union also pointed out the lack of student democracy and student representation in universities, which they deemed an underlying problem and a cause of the protests. The Dutch Student Union also published a joint statement with the Amsterdam Student Union (ASVA Studentenvakbond) specifically condemning police intervention during the protests in Amsterdam.

Amnesty International was also critical of the police intervention during the first protests at the University of Amsterdam. According to the organisation, police failed to take opportunities for de-escalation at a number of crucial moments. Insufficient distinction was made between peaceful demonstrators and people who used violence. Amnesty International was also critical of the attitudes towards protests in the current political climate. The student branch of Amnesty International Utrecht held a solidarity event on May 10.

The police interventions during the protests at Utrecht University, which included moving protesters to different locations on behalf of the Public Prosecution Service, were called unlawful by experts in the field of criminal law, including professors and lawyers.

=== University responses ===
Although multiple universities have published lists and overviews of their collaborations with Israeli organisations, they refused to break their ties with them. A reason not to break the ties was for many universities the concept of academic freedom. Despite not wanting to break ties, many universities pledged to set up specific ethics committees, similar to existing ones focusing on experimental and medical human research. This has been described as a political move, and activists in return have rejected this in an open letter that they published on social media.

==== Timeline ====
On May 6, the first day of protests, the University of Amsterdam provided a list of Israeli organisations they work with, which was one of the demands of the encampment protestors. They refused to partake in a boycott of those organisations, which was the second demand. Later that week, on May 10, the Central Student Council of the University of Amsterdam called for the UvA board to resign after the board allowed for police to intervene during the first protest. Despite negotiations having taken place the week before, during the second week of protests the UvA board made it known no longer to be talking to activists at all. Other universities were stilling willing to negotiate with protesters.

Erasmus University Rotterdam followed on May 8 by releasing a similar list as the University of Amsterdam did two days prior, despite no university protests having taken place in Rotterdam by then. The university would be evaluating the existing ties with Israeli organisations.

On 10 May, the University of Groningen published a statement giving insight on its relations with Israeli organisations, though it did not name any specific institutions.

On 11 May, the Royal Academy of Art (KABK) in The Hague announced their plans to terminate the student exchange programme with the Israeli Bezalel Academy of Arts and Design. This was done in response to heavy student criticism. By doing so, the KABK was the first Dutch educational institution to cancel an agreement with an Israeli organisation.

On May 13, as a response to an open letter, the Eindhoven University of Technology also showed more transparency by talking about the Israeli organisations they are working with. At that moment the only "institutional partnership" between the university and an Israeli organisation was Technion – Israel Institute of Technology through the EuroTech Universities Alliance. However, the university still refused to take position in the Israeli-Palestinian conflict.

On May 14, the Design Academy Eindhoven announced it would 'freeze' its ties with two design schools in Israel. The Rotterdam University of Applied Sciences announced on the same day that it would break it's ties with the Bezalel Academy of Arts and Design.

On May 15, Utrecht University (UU) released an adjusted statement of the original statement from October 23, 2023, by the executive board and the deans, partly in response to the heavy student protests. Although the UU did not decide to break ties with Israeli organisations as a whole, the university announced to be releasing a list of collaborations with Israeli organisations soon and to "critically evaluate" these ties. The UU also promised to freeze ties with individual organisations, if it become clear that these would "contribute to (the continuation of) the cycle of violence". Additionally, the UU said to be "deeply concerned about the destruction of the academic infrastructure in Gaza". A list was published two days later.

Also on May 15, a statement by Rianne Letschert from Maastricht University on behalf of the executive board was published, in which the board explicitly defends the right to protest of students and staff members.

On May 17, Leiden University published a statement giving insight in its collaborations with Israeli organisations. Additionally, exchange programmes with the Hebrew University of Jerusalem and Tel Aviv University were frozen until further evaluation. In an open letter the same day, the University of Humanistic Studies published a list of collaborations with Israeli organisations. The Vrije Universiteit Amsterdam pointed in an open letter to the CORDIS website for an overview of their collaborations with Israeli institutions, and also to be developing a framework for international collaborations for new and existing collaborations, as the KU Leuven and other universities had done before.

On May 22, the Delft University of Technology officially called for a ceasefire, but did not publish a list of collaborations with Israeli organisations, and did not want to break ties with them.

On May 28, Wageningen University & Research filed complaints against slogans used during a protest, drawing comparisons between Israeli and Nazi Germany. Maastricht University also filed complaints this day, regarding vandalism.

On June 3, Delft University of Technology also filed complaints against several activists.

=== Journalists ===
The Dutch Association of Journalists (Nederlandse Vereniging van Journalisten; NVJ) has at multiple times expressed concerns regarding the press freedom and safety at the demonstrations. Journalists were repeatedly denied entry at various demonstrations and were asked to leave. According to the protesters, this is to protect the identities and safety of those protesting.

Between May 6 and 15, twenty-one reports were filed at PersVeilig ("PressSafe"). PersVeilig is an organisation dedicated to the safety of journalists in the Netherlands, initiated by the NVJ and the Public Prosecution Service, among others. Of the reports, nineteen were made in allegation to protesters and two were regarding behaviour by the police. No charges were filed, however, because most acts were not deemed illegal despite causing hindrance.

=== General public ===
Opinions in the general population were more diverse. An opinion panel research by EenVandaag published on 10 May, including 16,036 people (of which 560 students), showed that a majority of the panel members (83%) disagreed with the methods protestors used, and 75% agreed with the police intervention that followed. A smaller majority (62%) also disagreed with the protestors' demands. However, students were much more likely to agree with the protestors' goals and demands (63%), and 43% of student panel members agreed with the way the demonstrations were held.

Another poll by Ipsos I&O, based on 2,102 participants between May 9 and 13, showed similar statistics. 21% supported the protests, while 65% agreed with the police interventions. Right-wing voters and older people almost unanimously reject the protests. Left-wing voters and young people were generally divided on the issue. Among young people aged 18–24, 40% supported the protests while 27% did not. Voters of the parties Denk, GroenLinks–PvdA and Party for the Animals tended to support the protests, while voters of other left-wing parties did not. About half of non-Western allochtonen supported the protests, while this was only 17% for ethnically Dutch people.

=== Impact on demonstration policies ===
Jouke de Vries, interim chairman of the Universiteiten van Nederland, said in an interview during an episode with Buitenhof that the organisation was currently working on a new "demonstration protocol". Examples of measures being discussed included overnight stays not being allowed in university buildings and protesters with whom negotiations are taking place having to identify themselves. This was supported by Robbert Dijkgraaf, the Dutch Ministry of Education, Culture and Science and tenured professor at the UvA. The Dutch Student Union was critical, and asked to be part of the discussions. The Universiteiten van Nederland later released a joint protocol.

The Federation of Dutch Trade Unions has stated in an open letter that the new demonstration policy by Universiteiten van Nederland "does not comply with the law".

In an interview with Het Parool, Dijkgraaf said in regards to closing university buildings that this is an "ultimate resource that we should not accept", and added that "it cannot be justified if an educational institution can no longer provide education". The newspaper confirmed that "emergency scenarios" were made and ready to allow education at universities to continue in case of protests "getting out of hand" again, and that universities, the current cabinet and the Dutch police were making plans to ensure that education at 'risk universities' could continue, online or in well-secured buildings.

=== Other ===
The Centrum Informatie en Documentatie Israel, a pro-Israel lobby organisation, filed a request against Leiden University, demanding to know which employees were in contact with Dutch pro-Palestinian groups.

== See also ==
- List of pro-Palestinian protests in the Netherlands
- List of pro-Palestinian protests on university campuses in 2024
- 2024 pro-Palestinian protests on university campuses
- 2024 University of Twente pro-Palestinian campus protests
- 2024 University of Amsterdam pro-Palestinian campus occupation
- 2024 Radboud University Nijmegen pro-Palestinian campus occupation
- 2025 pro-Palestinian protests on university campuses in the Netherlands
