= 2024 University of Amsterdam pro-Palestinian campus occupations =

Demonstration in Amsterdam, Netherlands

2024 University of Amsterdam pro-Palestinian campus occupation
- Part of Gaza war protests (at universities (in 2024 (in the Netherlands)))
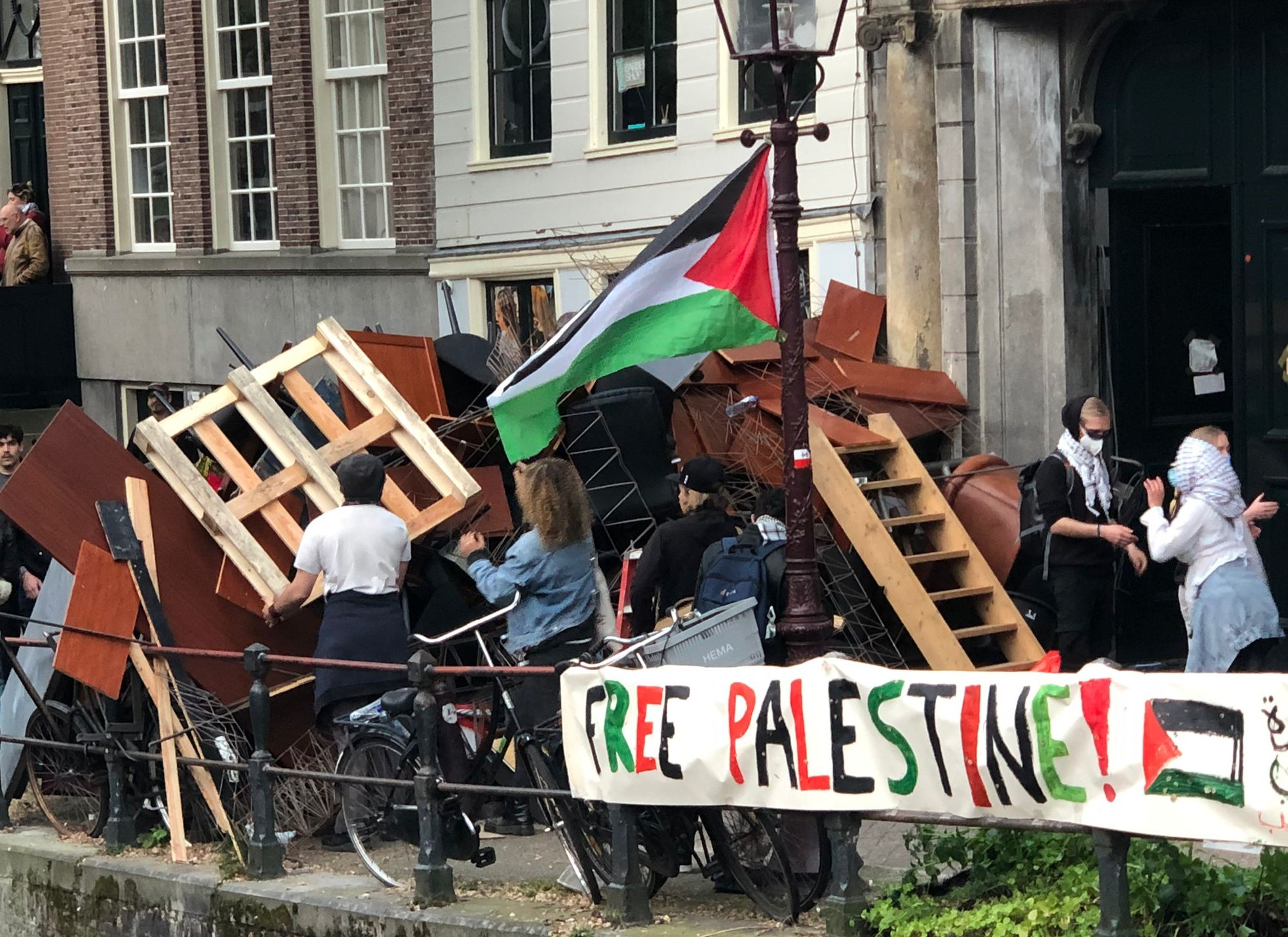
- Protesters reinforcing a barricade, May 7
- Date: May 6, 2024 – present (2 years, 6 months and 12 days)
- Location: University of Amsterdam, Amsterdam, Netherlands.
- Methods: Protests; walkouts; occupations; sit-ins

Casualties
- Injuries: 9+ (Note: Although the municipal parties of GroenLinks, PvdA and D66 in Amsterdam have asked for clarification about the number of injured protesters and bystanders and despite various media reports and injuries, it is unknown how many more protesters may have been injured. The number of injuries includes at least 1 protester and 1 police officer during the night between May 6 and 7, and 2 protesters and 5 officers on May 8.)
- Arrested: 210+ (Note: 169 in the night between May 6 and 7, 36 on May 8, 3 on May 9, 1 on May 13 and 1 on May 17.)
- Damage: at least €1.5 million (Note: This estimate number only includes damage to university property during the first week of protests. The number does not include damage caused to municipal property and to neighboring companies and individuals.)

On May 6, 2024 University of Amsterdam (UvA) students established a pro-Palestinian protest occupation on the Roeterseiland campus to support Palestinians in Gaza and demand action from administrators. This became the first in a series of pro-Palestinian protests on university campuses throughout the Netherlands. On May 7, 169 people were detained when the police used a bulldozer to break down the barricades after the protesters refused to leave.

In response to the protests, UvA published a list of cooperations with Israeli institutions and universities. The university estimated 1.5 million euros in damages after the first week of protests.

== Background ==
=== Escalation of protests ===
By May 6, 2024, student protests had occurred in 45 of the 50 states in the United States and the District of Columbia, with encampments, occupations, walkouts or sit-ins on almost 140 campuses. Thirty-four encampments were established in the United Kingdom; across universities in Australia, beginning with the University of Sydney; and in Canada, including an encampment at McGill University. On May 7, protests spread further on European campuses after mass arrests at the University of Amsterdam campus occupation, including occupation of campus buildings at Leipzig University in Germany, Sciences Po in France, and Ghent University in Belgium. By May 8, protests had taken place in more than 25 countries, and on May 13, approximately 1,000 Dutch students and university staff took part in a national walk-out.

=== List of protests ===
Encampments were established at 36 institutions in the United Kingdom, including 21 of the 24 institutions in the Russell Group, with some institutions having more than one encampment; across universities in Australia, beginning with the University of Sydney; and in Canada, including an encampment at McGill University. On May 7, protests spread further on European campuses after mass arrests at the University of Amsterdam campus occupation, including occupation of campus buildings at Leipzig University in Germany, Sciences Po in France, and Ghent University in Belgium. As of May 8, protests have taken place in more than 25 countries. On May 13, approximately 1,000 Dutch students and university staff took part in a national walk-out.

== Timeline ==
=== May 6–7: First encampment, eviction, and second occupation ===
On May 6, 2024 University of Amsterdam (UvA) students gathered to protest at Roeterseiland campus, demanding the university to disclose and cut off its ties with Israeli institutes and corporations. An encampment was erected on the lawn of the campus thereafter, encircled by barricades made of bricks, planks and ropes. Later that night, a group of people in support of Israel sought out a confrontation with demonstrators at the encampment, throwing flares and fireworks at them. They were soon driven away by the demonstrators, while the police did not attempt to intervene. The demonstration went quiet as the night deepened. Most protestors at the encampment rested in tents.

After midnight on May 7, riot police and police dogs were mobilized to raid and evict the encampment. Bulldozers were implemented to demolish the barricades, and some demonstrators tried to fight back. Physical conflicts between protestors and the police took place, followed by the arrest of 169 people, including a member of the Provincial Council of Gelderland. At least one protester suffered head injuries, while a police officer got injured as well. Most people left the scene by 4:30 am. Around 4 pm, over a thousand people gathered at Roeterseiland campus of University of Amsterdam, condemning the reaction from the university to call on the police for the eviction of the encampment.

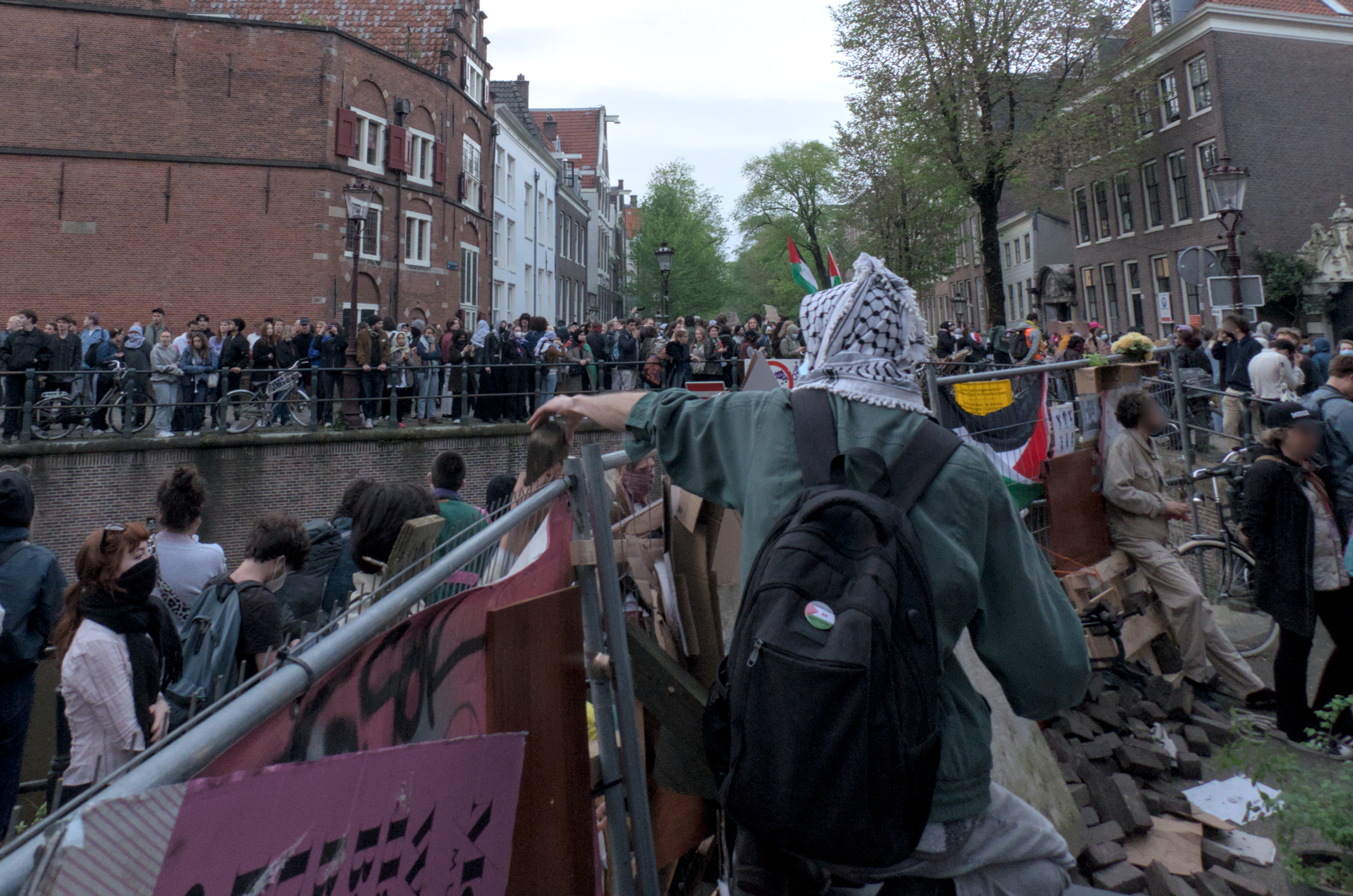
The barricades at Oudemanhuispoort, May 7

Later on, the protesting people marched along Weesperstraat and ended up at Oudemanhuispoort campus of University of Amsterdam. The demonstrators soon took over the buildings and set another encampment inside. Paving bricks, bicycle racks, desks, planks and other objects were removed by demonstrators to establish barricades, which blocked all essential paths to the encampment. A number of supporters stayed outside the barricades and echoed the chanting from demonstrators settling in the encampment. The encampment lasted throughout the night without interference from the police.

=== May 8–9: Second eviction and continued demonstrations ===
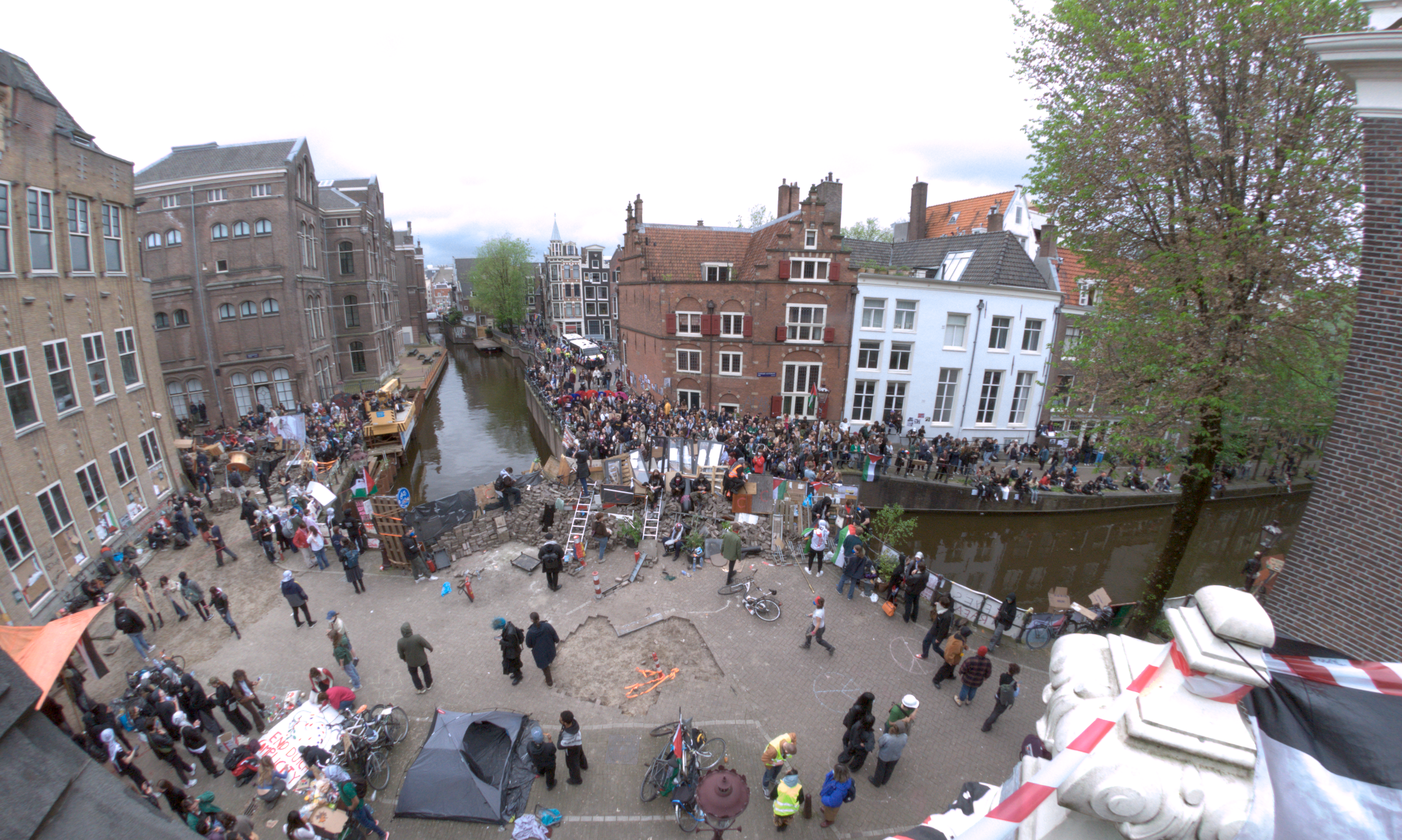
Overview of the Oudemanhuispoort barricades, May 8

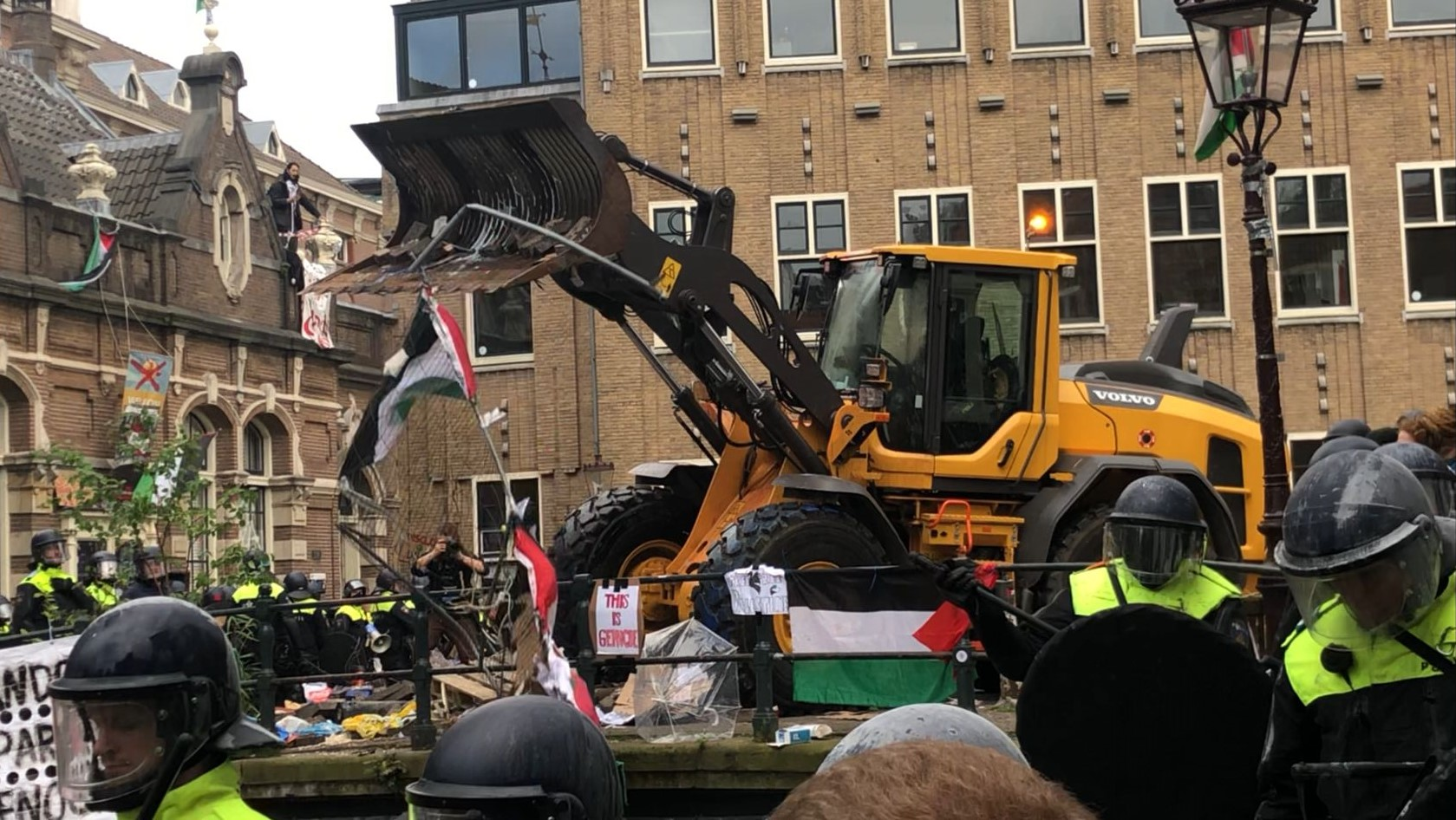
Bulldozer demolishing a barricade, Grimburgwal, May 8

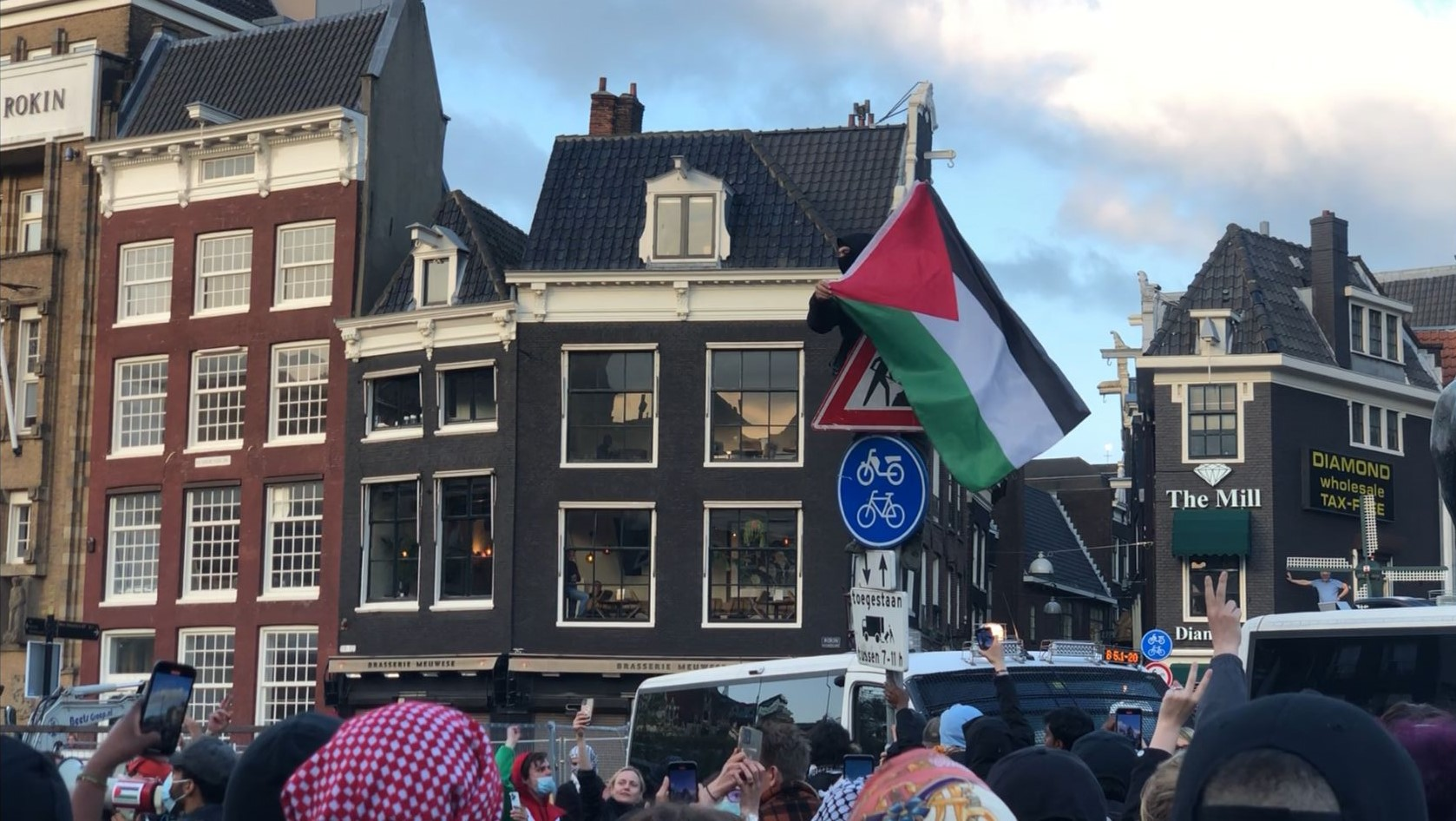
A demonstrator took the top of a traffic sign pole at Rokin and showed a Palestinian flag, May 8

The executive board of University of Amsterdam said in a statement on May 8 that a discussion between the executive board and protestors was held in the same morning, and another conversation was scheduled later in the afternoon. Soon after, riot police broke into the encampment in the afternoon as barricades were demolished by bulldozers. Protestors inside the encampments were cornered and later on removed by the police. It was also reported by witnesses that some people got attacked by the police for no reason.

With the eviction, a number of demonstrators moved to Rokin, in the vicinity of Oudemanhuispoort campus, and blocked Damrak, a main street in the city center of Amsterdam. The demonstration at Rokin continued for hours, and was ended as the police charged towards the protesting crowds. Some crowds were dispersed as being chased by police vans, batons and police dogs. A number of them ended up at Rembrandtplein, where the demonstration slowly subsided. 36 people were arrested by the end of the night, while at least five police officers and at least two protesters were injured, though the specific number of injured protesters is unknown.

On May 9, another protest was organised that again started at the Roeterseiland university campus of University of Amsterdam. Thousands of protestors went on to march through the city. Three protestors were arrested by the police. The university closed most of its buildings for the rest of the week.

=== May 13–17: Third and fourth occupations and evictions ===
On May 13, after a national walk-out which was attended by approximately one thousand students and staff members, students occupied campus buildings at the University of Amsterdam. Police in riot gear subsequently ended the protests in Amsterdam after "chasing away hundreds" of people, and the university closed for two days after the renewed occupations on campus. The Amsterdam protest continued at Oosterpark. The UvA filed complaints against several protesters. One protester was arrested; a criminal investigation was ongoing to determine if more arrests would follow.

A pro-Palestine protest march was planned to pass UvA campus buildings on May 15. However, as an event by Booking.com was announced for this day, organisers decided to move the protest to the Booking.com headquarters. Although there were no demonstrations the next day, the entrance at the Roeterseiland campus was defaced with red paint. This also happened during the earlier demonstrations.

On May 17, a group of protesters gathered at a UvA building to set up a new tent encampment there, which lasted about an hour and was ended after police in riot gear made their presence. The group of student protesters joined a different protest elsewhere in the city, with who they marched to the Stopera, where they held a sit-in. This demonstration was ended by police in riot gear as well, resulting in at least one arrest.

=== May 18–29: Later protests ===
On May 25, about a hundred people held a peaceful demonstration at a UvA building at the Spui. Protesters spoke out against, among other things, Amsterdam mayor Femke Halsema and the American support for Israel. They went on to march through the Rokin, Rembrandtplein, the Utrechtsestraat and ended at Achter Oosteinde, where a squatted building was declared the "University of Gaza", and named after Shadia Abu Ghazaleh.

A pro-Palestinian protest was held by UvA staff members on May 28.

== See also ==
- List of pro-Palestinian protests in the Netherlands
- 2024 pro-Palestinian protests on university campuses
- 2024 pro-Palestinian protests on university campuses in the Netherlands
- 2024 Radboud University Nijmegen pro-Palestinian campus occupation
- 2025 pro-Palestinian protests on university campuses in the Netherlands
