= 2024 Sciences Po pro-Palestinian occupation protest =

Protest in Paris, France

2024 Pro-Palestinian Protests at Sciences Po
- Part of Gaza war protests (at universities (in 2024))
- Date: April 2024
- Location: Sciences Po, Paris, France
- Caused by: Gaza war; Solidarity with Palestine
- Goals: End of Sciences Po's alleged support for Israel
- Methods: Demonstrations; Occupations

Parties
Pro-Palestinian students	Sciences Po administration; French police

The 2024 pro-Palestinian occupation protest at Sciences Po was a series of pro-Palestinian protests that took place at Sciences Po in Paris. The protest was part of a larger global movement of university protests in solidarity with Palestine, inspired by similar encampments at universities in the United States.

== Background ==
The protests began in response to the ongoing Gaza war. Students of Sciences Po, one of France's most prestigious universities, began blocking the school's main entrance. Students showed their support for the Palestinians by chanting slogans and displaying Palestinian flags on the windows and doors of the building.

== Events ==
On 25 April 2024, dozens of students blocked the entrance to a campus building in central Paris with trash, a motorcycle, pieces of metal and a wooden platform. About 40 people remained in the building overnight. The demonstration was organized by the Palestine Committee of Sciences Po, which called on the administration to cut ties with universities and companies for allegedly supporting Israel's aggression in Gaza.

The protests escalated when the Compagnies Républicaines de Sécurité (CRS) intervened to break up the demonstration. This renewed the protests, with the students resuming the demonstration after police intervention. Students continued to mobilize despite repression.

== Aftermath ==
After police intervention, the pro-Palestinian students peacefully evacuated the campus building. The head of Sciences Po said that an agreement was reached with the students. The students stated that they would to continue supporting the Palestinian movement.

== See also ==
- List of pro-Palestinian protests in France
- 2024 pro-Palestinian protests on university campuses
- 2024 University of Amsterdam pro-Palestinian campus occupation
- March for the Republic and Against Antisemitism
