= McGill University pro-Palestinian encampment =

Occupation protest in Quebec, Canada

- Part of Gaza war protests (at universities (in 2024))
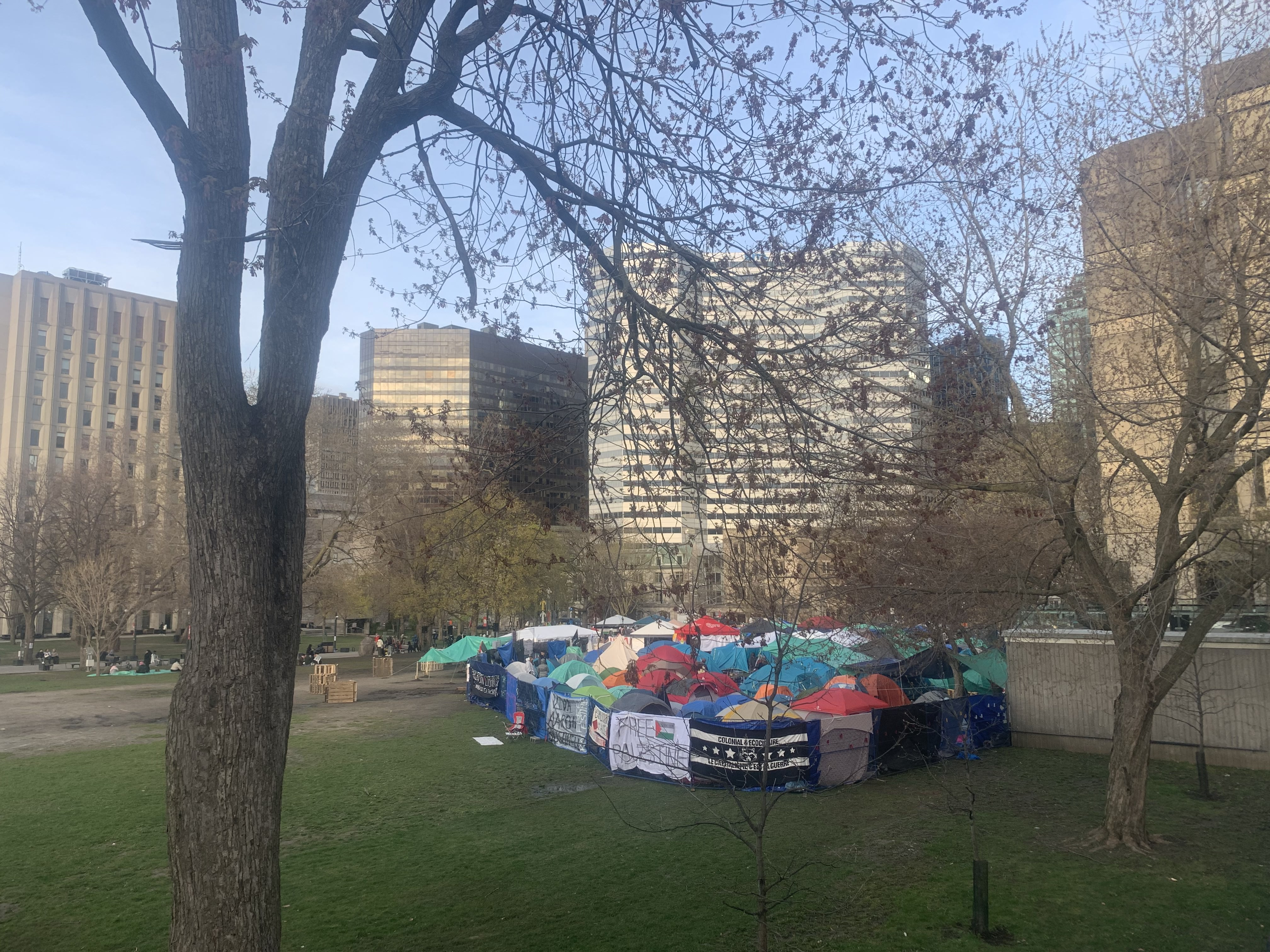
- View of the encampment from the Redpath Library
- Date: 27 April 2024 — 10 July 2024 (2 years, 6 months, 3 weeks and 1 day)
- Location: McGill University, Montreal, Quebec, Canada; 45°30′14″N 73°34′33″W
- Goals: For McGill University and Concordia University to: divest from Israel-related funds, including weapons manufacturers; cut ties with Israeli universities; publicly condemn Israel's assault on Gaza
- Methods: Occupation protest
- Status: Dismantled

Parties
Organizing pro-Palestinian student groups: McGill and Concordia chapters of: Solidarity for Palestinian Human Rights (SPHR); Independent Jewish Voices	Opponents: McGill University administration; Deep Saini (president); Pro-Israel counter-protesters

The McGill University pro-Palestinian encampment was an occupation protest which took place on the downtown campus of McGill University, in Montreal, from 27 April to 10 July 2024. It was the first notable (Note: News media described the McGill encampment as the first one in Canada, although social media posts document a few tents on the campus of the University of Alberta on 22 April 2024.) Canadian demonstration in the 2024 movement of pro-Palestinian protests on university campuses, which called for universities to cut ties with Israel amid the country's assault on Gaza in the Gaza war. Like many of its predecessors, the protest at McGill took the form of an encampment, a group of tents occupied day and night by protesters.

The encampment was organized by a collective of pro-Palestinian student groups from McGill and the nearby Concordia University. Their demands were for those universities to cut ties with Israel, including by divesting from Israel-related funds such as weapons manufacturers. Roughly 20 tents were initially set up close to the Roddick Gates and encircled by a metal fence. In the following days, the encampment grew to roughly 100 tents. It was equipped with various amenities and hosted daily activities related to the protest. Students and faculty from various Montreal universities, which also included the Université du Québec à Montréal and Université de Montréal, occupied the tents.

McGill University stated that the encampment was illegal and requested police assistance to dismantle it. The university's president, Deep Saini, accused protesters of antisemitism. The encampment was repeatedly described as peaceful. The Superior Court of Quebec rejected two injunction requests against the protest, the second of which was filed by McGill itself. The premier of Quebec, François Legault, joined the university in declaring the encampment illegal and requested police intervention. The encampment was dismantled by McGill on 10 July 2024.

== Background ==
=== Student groups ===
Since the beginning of the Gaza war on 7 October 2023, student groups at Montreal's two English-language universities, McGill and Concordia, have taken on a visible role as they have held protests and demonstrations in support of either Palestine or Israel. On 8 November 2023, an altercation erupted at Concordia after two student groups, Solidarity for Palestinian Human Rights (SPHR) Concordia and StartUp Nation, set up neighbouring kiosks in a common space. The former was raising funds for the Gaza humanitarian crisis while the latter sought to raise awareness about hostages held by Hamas. Three injuries were reported and a student was arrested. On 19 December, McGill removed the university's name from its chapter of SPHR after reviewing a since-deleted social media post describing the October 7 attacks in 2023, as "heroic".

=== Protests against McGill's investments ===
At McGill University, pro-Palestinian groups have protested against the institution's investments in Israel-related funds, including weapons manufacturers. In a referendum held on 20 November 2023, 78% of participating students voted in favour of a policy calling on the university to cut ties with companies "complicit in genocide", as well as condemn Israel's bombing of the Gaza Strip. McGill threatened to end its agreement with its student union, the Students' Society of McGill University (SSMU), if the latter ratified the policy. This agreement includes the SSMU's funding and their use of the McGill name. The Superior Court of Quebec halted the adoption of the policy after an injunction was filed by a student. On 19 February 2024, a small group of McGill students began a hunger strike to call on the university to divest from Israel. A protester who did not eat for 34 days was eventually sent to the hospital. On 22 February, demonstrators blocked the entrances of McGill's Bronfman building, where the Desautels Faculty of Management is located, to protest against that particular faculty's investments in Israel.

==== Composition of McGill's endowment fund ====
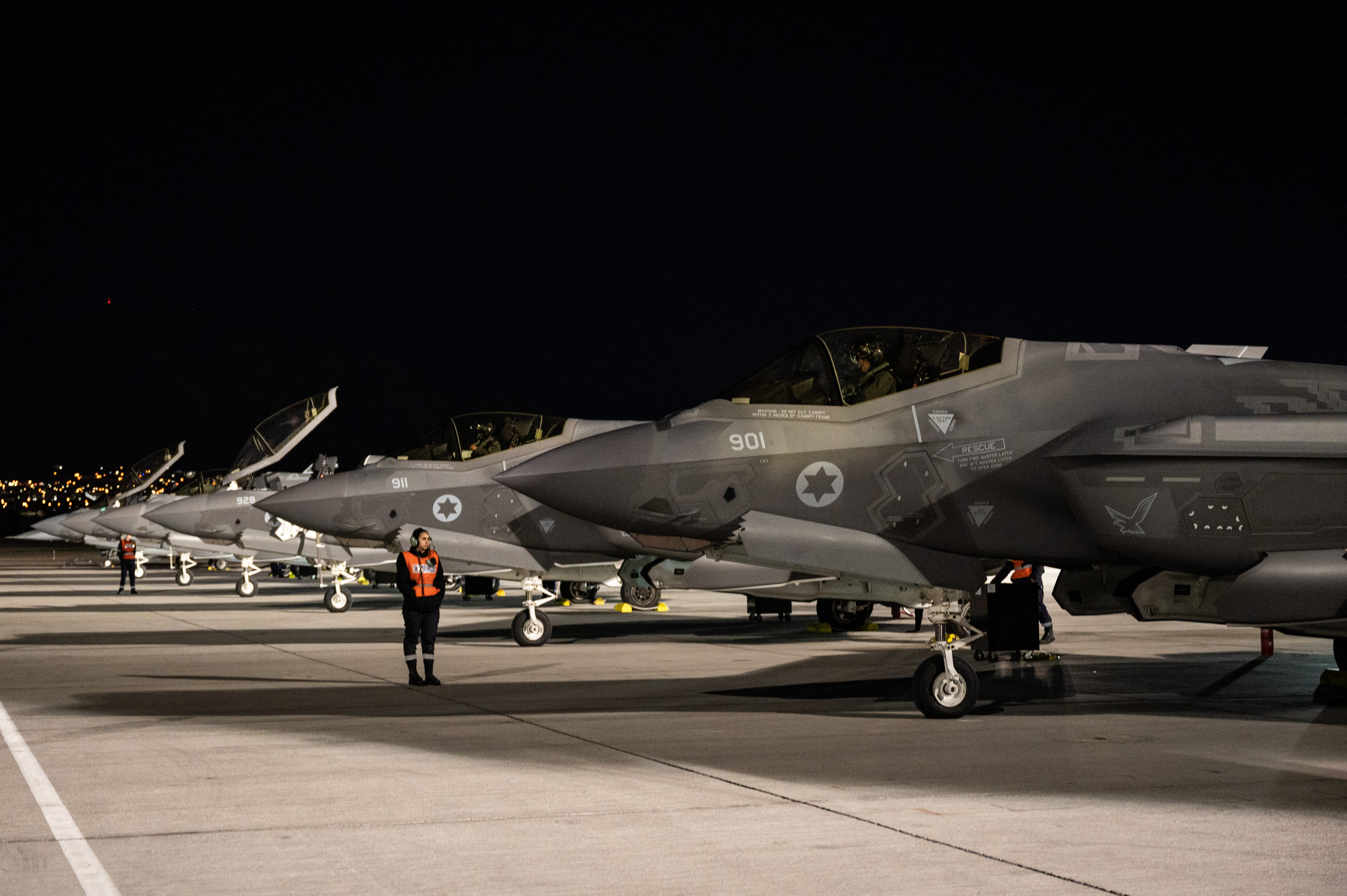
Investments in Lockheed Martin, which supplies fighter jets to Israel, were especially contested

On 18 April 2024, two of McGill's pro-Palestinian student groups published a data set compiling 50 Israel-related companies that the university held investments in as of 31 December 2023. These investments, which were publicly disclosed on McGill's website, totalled at least $73 million. Of this amount, more than $5.5 million were invested in military technology companies which have contracts with the IDF, including Lockheed Martin, Thales, Safran, Dassault, Airbus and BAE Systems. Multiple other companies who operate in Israeli settlements, as well as large Canadian banks, listed because of their own investments in weapons manufacturers, appear in the data set. McGill's endowment fund, which is managed by external fund managers hired by the institution, is worth about $1.8 billion in total and created 6.1% of its revenue in 2023. As for Concordia University, it does not publicly disclose its investments.

=== Encampment protests in the United States ===
On 17 April 2024, students at Columbia University, in New York City, set up an encampment on their campus as a form of occupation protest against their university's investments in Israel. The next day, Columbia president Minouche Shafik summoned the New York City Police Department (NYPD) to dismantle the encampment, leading to the arrest of over 100 protesters. The event garnered national attention and sparked the creation of pro-Palestinian encampments across the country and the world.

== Organizing ==
Pro-Palestinian students in Montreal were directly inspired by the movement of encampment protests taking shape in the United States. The McGill encampment, nicknamed the "liberated zone", was first announced on social media by the McGill and Concordia chapters of Solidarity for Palestinian Human Rights (SPHR). McGill and Concordia chapters of the group Independent Jewish Voices were also organizers.

=== First day ===
On the morning of 27 April 2024, a Saturday, the McGill administration sent a communique to students in response to social media posts announcing the encampment on campus. The email informed them that encampments were "not permitted on our campus" and that they "can create serious health and safety concerns while increasing the potential for escalation and confrontation". McGill did not initially state whether it would ask for the tents to be forcibly removed.

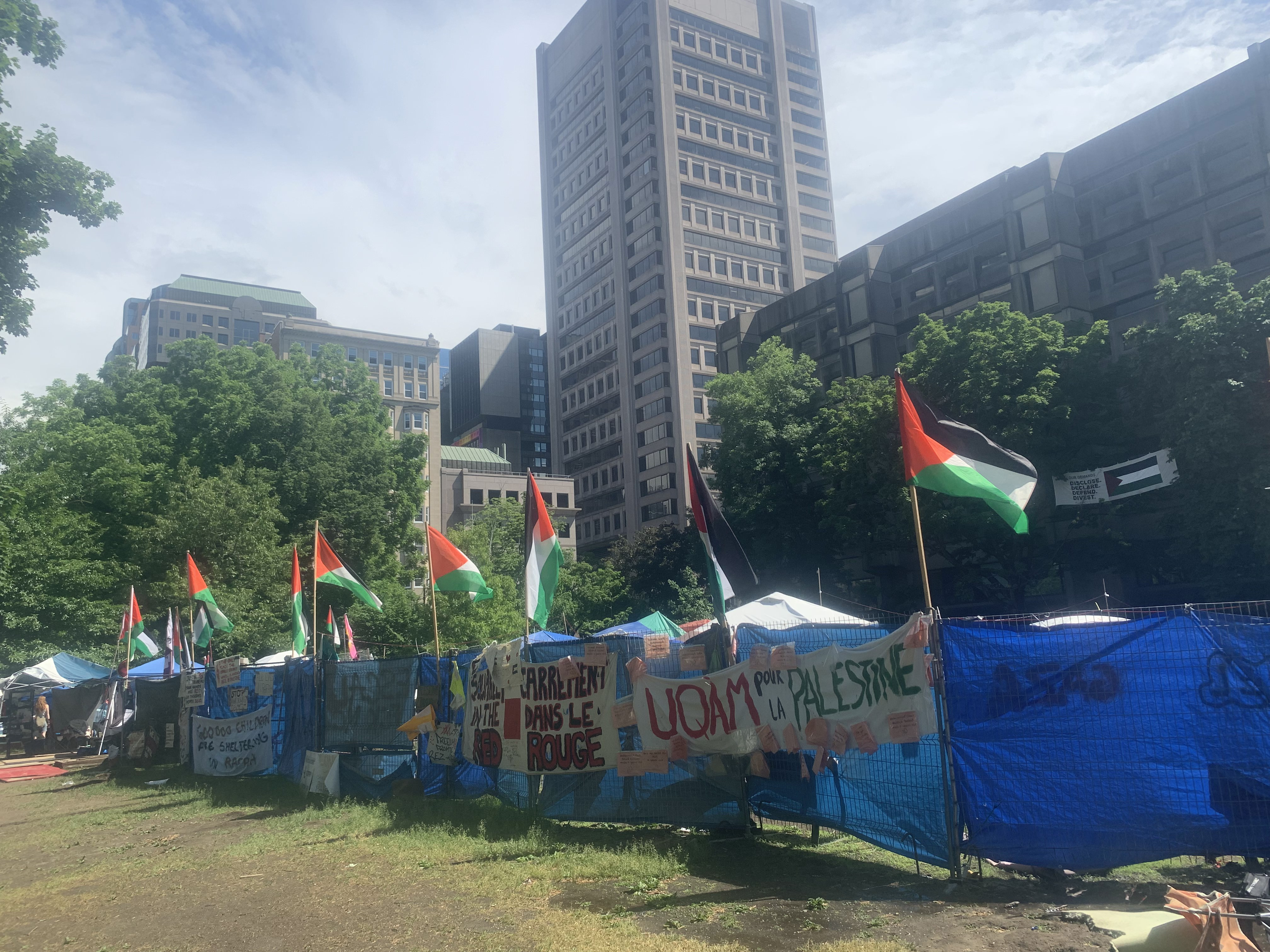
A tall fence was erected around the encampment and covered with signs

That same day, sometime after 1:30 PM, around 20 tents were erected on the field behind the Roddick Gates, the main entrance to the McGill campus. Tall metal fences were set up around the encampment and decorated with signs and flags. More than 100 protesters attended the construction process. Sometime before 3:30 PM, another larger group of demonstrators, which had been marching down Rue Sherbrooke, reached the encampment. Much of the group left campus by 7:30 PM. It rained on the first night of the occupation protest.

News media have described the McGill pro-Palestinian encampment as the first of its kind in Canada, although social media posts document a small set of tents on the campus of the University of Alberta, in Edmonton, on 22 April 2024.

=== Demands ===
As is the case for other student protests sparked by the Gaza war, the McGill encampment demands that the universities of McGill and Concordia cut financial and academic ties with Israel. This entails the divestment from Israel-related funds, including weapons manufacturers doing business with the IDF and companies operating in Israeli-occupied territories, as well as the cutting of ties with Israeli universities. Additional demands include a public condamnation the Israeli assault on Gaza and the pressuring of the Canadian government in regards to its military ties with Israel, as well as the protection of students' right to protest. In general, the encampment is also described as an act of solidarity with Palestine.

== Encampment ==
=== Location and members ===
The "liberated zone" was located on the lower field of McGill's campus in downtown Montreal, behind its main entrance through the Roddick Gates, on Rue Sherbrooke. The area is also where McGill usually holds its spring graduation ceremonies. On 1 May 2024, the encampment spanned approximately 4,000 square metres (43,000 sq ft). From the initial 20 or so tents, it grew to about 100 tents within the first days and comprised more than 115 tents on 13 May 2024. The encampment was mostly inhabited by students from McGill and Concordia, who organized the protest, although Montreal's French-language universities, the Université du Québec à Montréal (UQAM) and Université de Montréal, are also represented. A group of roughly 100 professors also took turns sleeping at the encampment, providing help in the form of advice or laundry services, among other things. Besides the campers, many visitors also spend time on site and drop off supplies.

=== Structure and installation ===
According to protesters, the encampment developed an organizational structure, including a code of conduct with rules addressing issues such as hate speech and discrimination. Campers held a general assembly every morning, discussing the current events in Gaza and other subjects related to the protest. According to McGill, the group of protesters is non-hierarchical.

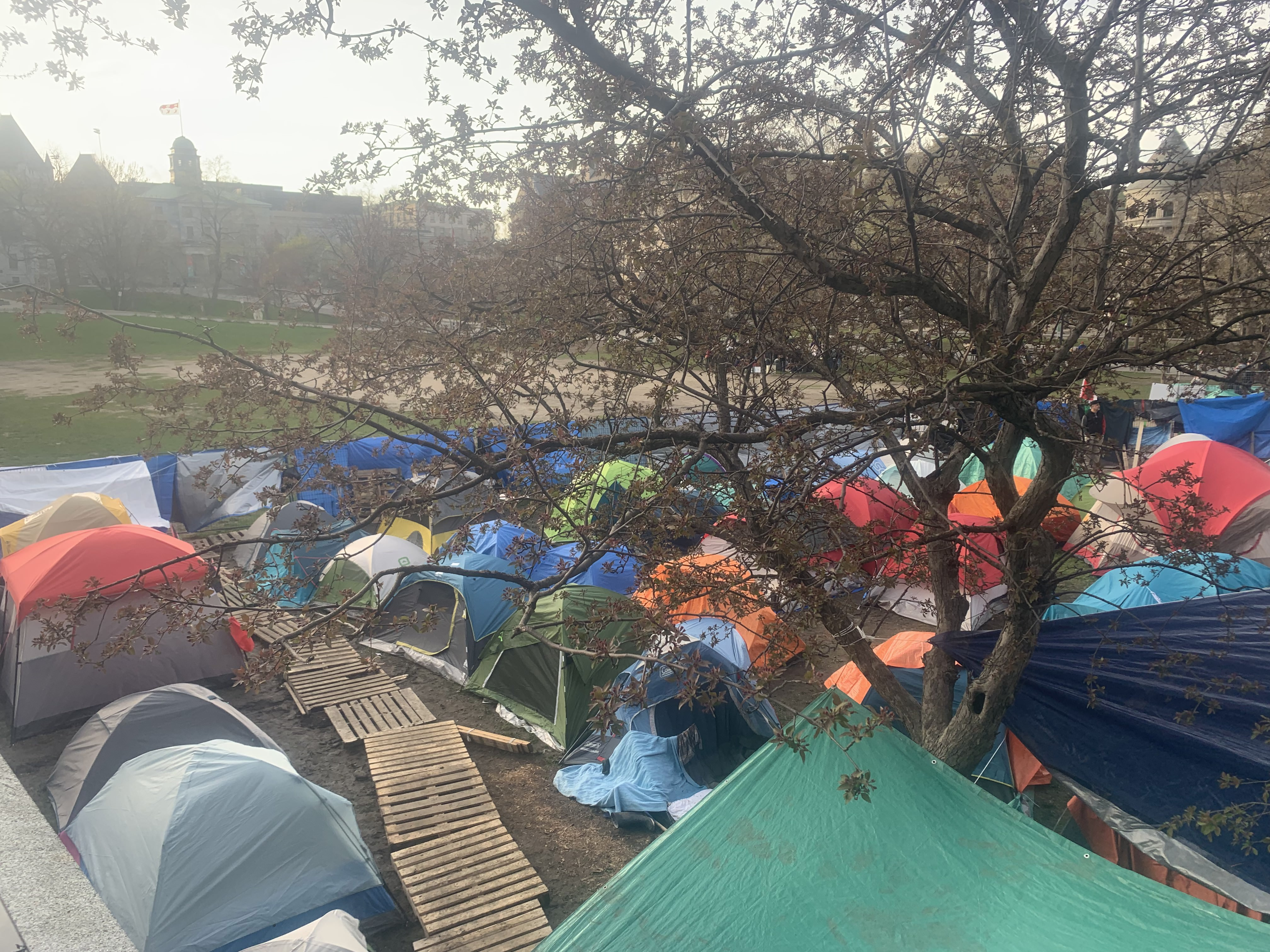
Wooden pallets provided walkways between tents

The protesters' tents were located inside a fenced-in area. The makeshift barricade was reinforced in the first week, after key figures called on the encampment to be dismantled. Reporters were not allowed past the fences. In front of the entrance, protesters welcomed visitors coming to drop off supplies, which included food, batteries, clothes, medicine and rain boots. The exterior portion of the encampment was extended with sun shelters, kiosks and a small stage where a microphone and speakers can be installed. A "free store" served coffee, food and rain gear. Because of a largely rainy first week, campers dug trenches, scooped water out with plastic pitchers and placed wooden pallets over the muddy lawn to provide walkways between the tents. Other amenities in the encampment included a library, a medical tent with trained personnel, community and prayer spaces, a generator and portable toilets. Montreal's fire department, the Service de sécurité incendie de Montréal (SIM), inspected the encampment and concluded that it was safe.

=== Activities ===
Many activities were held in and around the encampment. They have included poetry readings, music performances, lectures on Palestinian history, celebrations of Passover, debates, discussions, quilting and self-defence practice. A large screen had been set up outside of the encampment for films to be screened on. Palestinian films and The Battle of Algiers (1966) have been shown. A play zone for kids to make crafts was also set up on some days. On 5 May 2024, Red Dress Day in Canada, events were planned to commemorate missing and murdered Indigenous women. Organizers published a schedule of activities daily.

== Unfolding ==
=== Response from McGill University ===
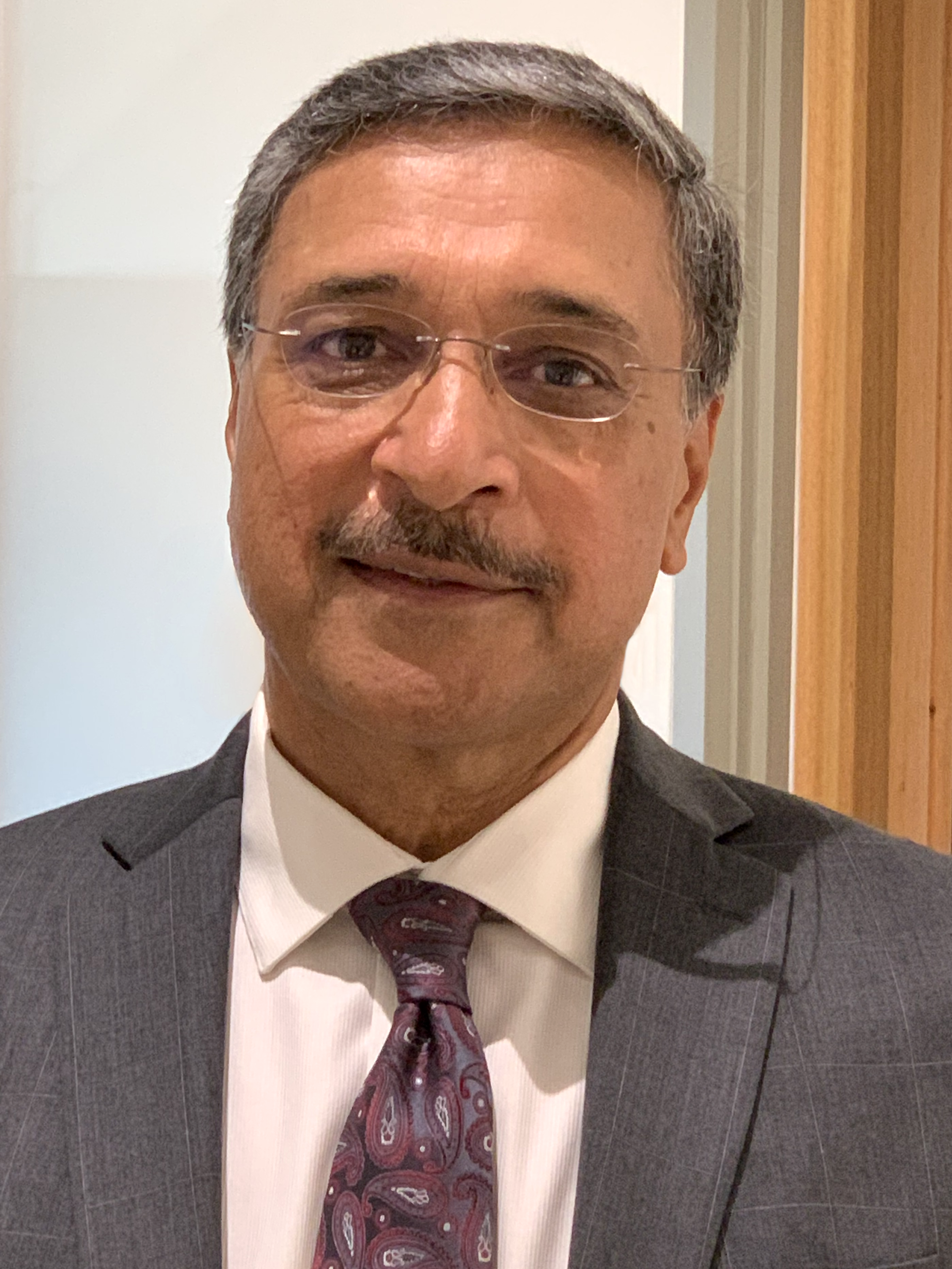
McGill president Deep Saini

On the first day of the protest, before tents were set up, McGill emailed a communique to students stating that encampments were "not permitted". After the tents were installed, McGill representatives requested for them to be removed, which protesters refused to do. That day, McGill declined to state whether the tents would be forcibly removed and did not request police assistance, according to Montreal's police department, the Service de police de la Ville de Montréal (SPVM).

Two days later, on 29 April 2024, McGill stated that the situation had "shifted significantly". It said the encampment, which had tripled in size since the first day, was largely occupied by non-McGill students and that it violated both university policy and the law. McGill's president, Deep Saini, denounced "obvious antisemitism" among protesters. The university further stated it was reviewing "video evidence of some people using unequivocally antisemitic language and intimidating behaviour", but did not initially disclose such evidence to journalists. At 4 PM, a spokesperson for McGill security handed protesters pamphlets asking them to disperse. He later returned to issue a "final warning" and stated the university could call the police. Later that day, McGill requested police assistance to the SPVM. The SPVM refused to intervene, instead urging McGill to resolve the situation through dialogue with the protesters.

The following day, on 30 April 2024, Saini reiterated that the dismantlement of the encampment was "non-negotiable". He committed to hold a forum with protesters, if they left campus, to discuss their demands "in a peaceful, respectful and civilized manner". A spokesperson for the protesters said the offer wasn't "serious" and that they would stay until they "see a divestment".

=== Security, legality and policing ===
The SPVM has repeatedly described the McGill encampment as peaceful. As of 8 May 2024, no incident had been reported on site. On 30 April 2024, one of the SPVM's spokespeople stated that the situation on campus was a civil matter and that "no crime [was] being committed".

On the first day of the encampment, several police vehicles were parked within sight of the site, although McGill's campus security was reportedly the entity in charge of the situation. On the evening of 1 May 2024, two minibuses of police officers in riot gear, who had been in downtown Montreal because of an unrelated protest, stopped in front of the encampment site for about 25 minutes. The following day, due to a planned pro-Israel counter-protest, dozens of police officers on bikes and horseback were deployed. On 6 May 2024, campus security and the police intercepted and seized supplies, such as N95 masks and sleeping bags, brought by supporters.

=== First injunction request ===
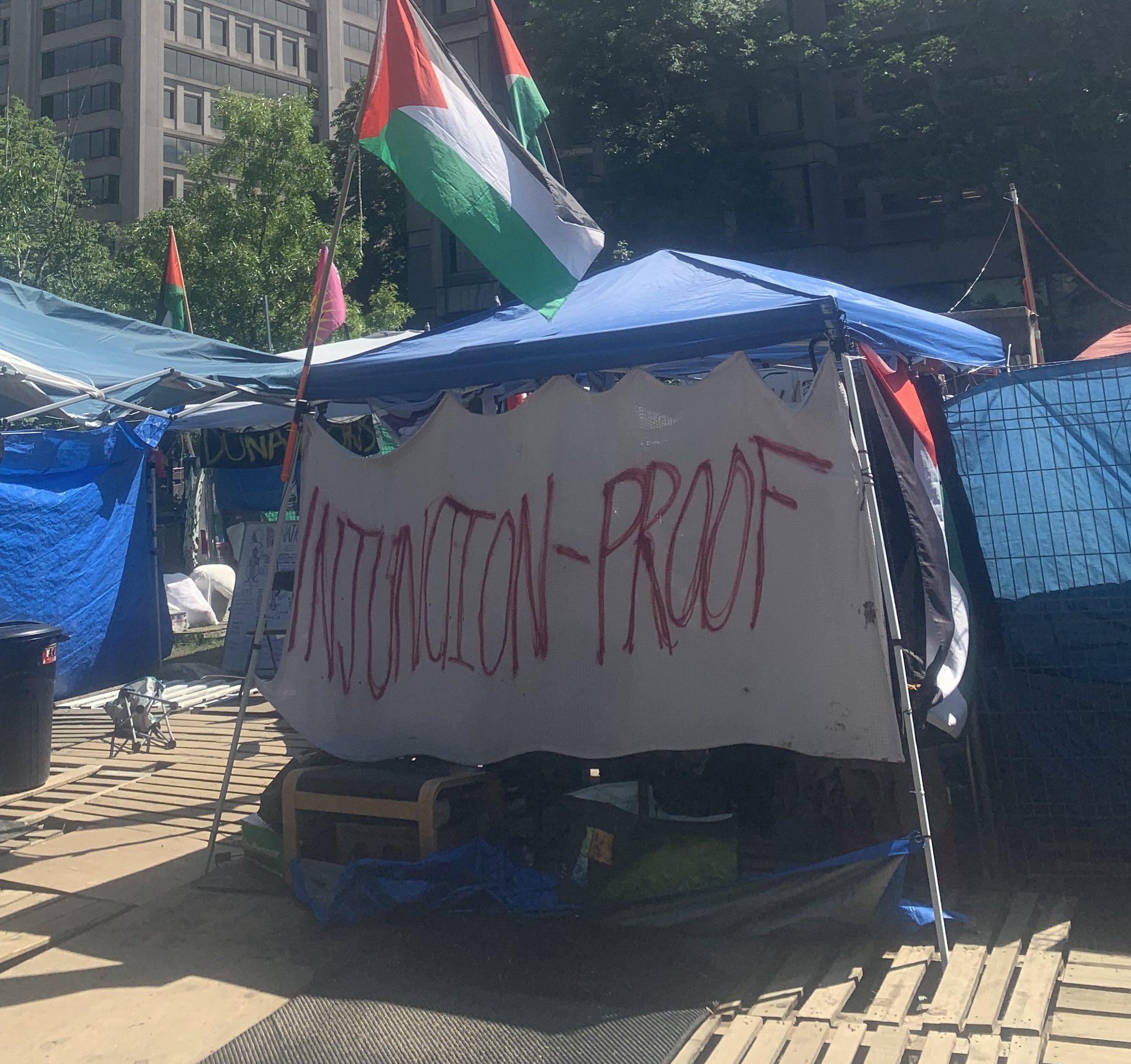
A banner at the encampment reads "injunction-proof" in reference to the two failed injunction requests against the protest

On 30 April 2024, an injunction request against the encampment was filed on behalf of two McGill students, one of them Jewish and the other Muslim. They alleged that chants from the protest, such as "Long live the intifada" and "Zionists are racist", created a hostile climate on campus and said that they were fearful. The temporary injunction would have prevented members from five pro-Palestinian groups, including SPHR, to protest within 100 metres of any of the 154 McGill buildings, for a period of 10 days.

27 videos were included with the request. One of them, which McGill shared with news media and stated they were "investigating" due to antisemitism, shows protesters chanting "Go back to Europe". A social media post, the video includes text which refers to them as "Jihadists". Members of the encampment stated the protesters in the video were not part of their group, and news media were not able to verify if the events occurred in the context of the encampment.

In a 10-page decision, Justice Chantal Masse of the Superior Court of Quebec denied the injunction request, writing that the safety concerns expressed by the students were “relating more to subjective fears and discomfort than to precise and serious fears for their security”. She also wrote that "the balance of inconveniences leans more toward the protesters, whose freedom of expression and to gather peacefully would be affected significantly". She invited pro-Palestinian protesters to better choose their words and to "dispense with those that could be perceived [...] as calls to violence or antisemitic", while maintaining "their anti-war message".

=== Counter-protest ===
On 2 May 2024, a pro-Israeli counter-protest took place outside of the Roddick Gates, within sight of the encampment. About 100 people attended, while about 400 were on the pro-Palestinian side. Dozens of riot police officers were deployed. The pro-Israeli protesters projected a looping documentary on the October 7 attacks on a large screen and played Hebrew-language music. There were no incidents or arrests associated with the confrontation.

=== Second injunction request ===
On 10 May 2024, a second injunction request was filed against the McGill encampment, this one with the university itself as the plaintiff. McGill requested that the Superior Court of Quebec order the dismantling of the encampment and authorize the SPVM to intervene. Although the defendants were listed as "John Doe and Jane Doe", multiple parties requested to be included as defendants or intervenors, including the Association of McGill Professors of Law (AMPL), which supports the protesters. In its request, McGill cited safety and public health concerns. It accused the protesters, described as "occupants" in a "fortress", of escalating tensions on campus and of relieving themselves on the site, alleging that there were barrels containing "human waste" inside the camp and that feces had been found in the McLennan Library's ventilation system.

On 15 May 2024, Justice Marc St-Pierre rejected the request and described it as "ill-founded", citing a lack of the urgency that may have justified an injunction. In his decision, St-Pierre wrote that the protest had been peaceful and that a provisional injunction could not be granted preemptively. He suggested that McGill modify the request and refile it within 10 days.

=== Occupation of the James Administration Building ===
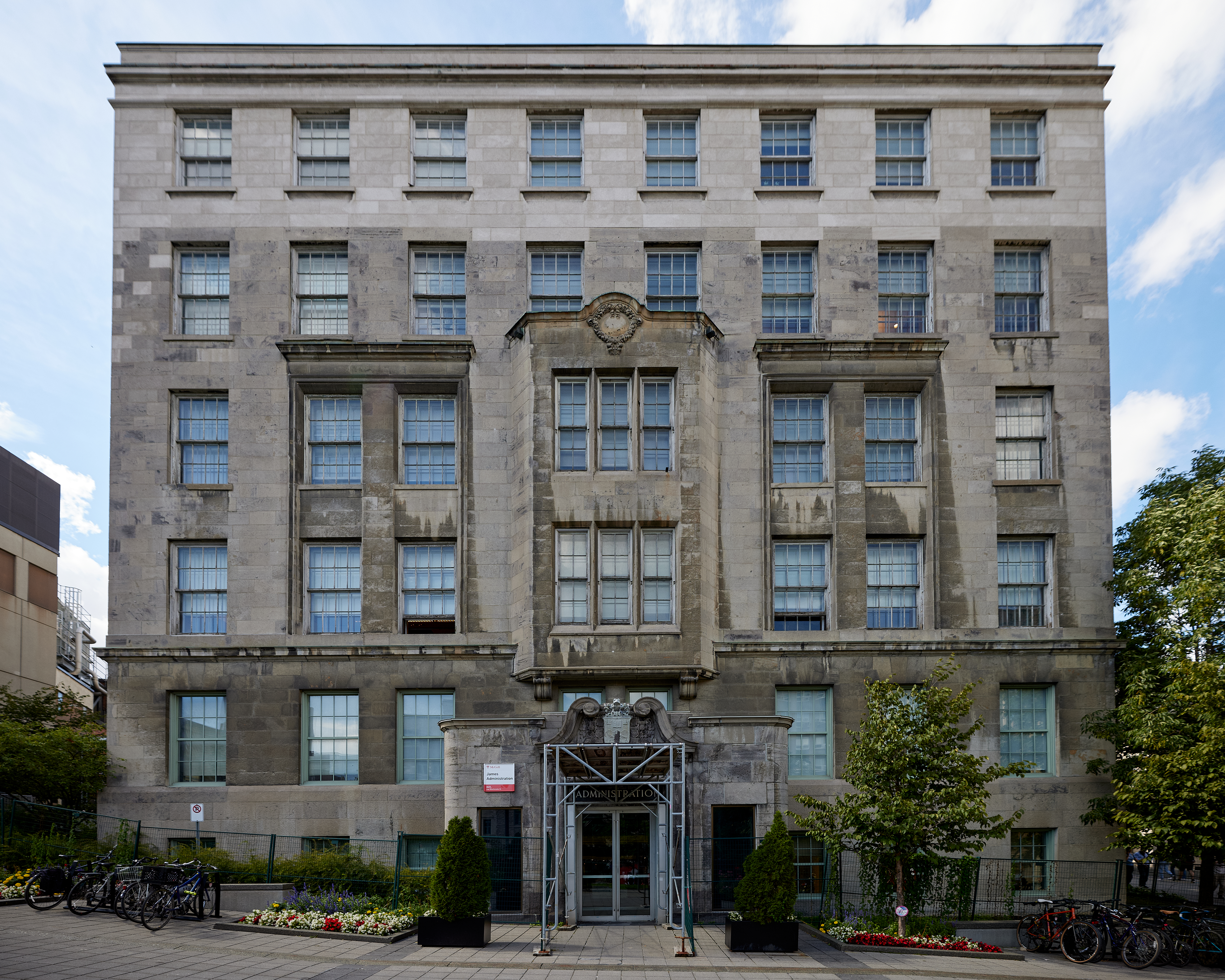
The James Administration Building

On 6 June 2024, a group of pro-Palestinian protesters occupied the third floor of the James Administration Building, part of McGill's downtown campus, for several hours. The occupation was conducted in reaction to the ongoing Israeli offensive in Rafah, Palestine. Protesters chained some of the building's entrances shut, excluding a back door, and chanted and banged on drums. In a statement, McGill alleged that they damaged furniture, "banged on the doors and yelled threats" at university staff.

Three hours after the protesters, riot squad officers of the SPVM entered the building following a request from McGill. Outside, police sprayed tear gas and cayenne pepper gel into a crowd that had gathered around the building. After some protesters regathered, police again sprayed chemical irritants and charged the crowd with batons and shields, pushing them away from the James Building. Two hours after police arrived, there were still protesters inside the building. Eventually, 13 protesters were arrested for breaking and entering, while 2 others were arrested for obstructing the work of police officers. An SPVM spokesperson also stated that criminal offences were committed in protests outside, on the McGill downtown campus and in neighbouring streets, including the throwing of pyrotechnic devices and stones at police officers.

=== Dismantlement ===
McGill University closed their campus on 10 July 2024 in preparation to break up the encampment, citing health concerns, vandalism and violence. Also the police had previously mentioned vandalism.

The university enlisted local police and private security to escort protesters away from the site while the encampment was demolished with excavators and bulldozers. One protester was arrested after allegedly assaulting a security guard.

== Responses ==
=== From political figures ===
On 2 May 2024, François Legault, the premier of Quebec, stated that the encampment was illegal and that it should be dismantled by the SPVM. He was criticized for his position, including by Quebec's federation of university professors, the FQPPU. François Bonnardel and Pascale Déry, ministers in Legault's government, also said the encampment was illegal. Montreal mayor Valérie Plante stated her wish to avoid a confrontation between protesters and the police, citing those that occurred around pro-Palestinian encampments in the United States. Yves-François Blanchet, leader of the Bloc Québécois, said the protesters should leave the site. Jagmeet Singh, leader of the New Democratic Party, defended their right to protest but said he was worried about a "threat towards Jewish students". Anthony Housefather, a Liberal MP from the Montreal region, published a video calling for the encampment to be dismantled on the day it was set up. Politician supporters of the encampment include Housefather's Liberal colleague, Salma Zahid. Amir Khadir and Haroun Bouazzi, two politicians associated with the provincial party Québec solidaire, visited the encampment site.

=== Allegations of antisemitism ===
Deep Saini and the McGill administration have condemned alleged antisemitism in the encampment. The Jewish organization B'nai Brith Canada associated the encampment with a "rising tide of antisemitism". A video shared by McGill shows a group of protesters chanting "Go back to Europe" on campus. Members of the encampment stated these protesters were not part of their group. They have rejected claims of antisemitism and said the protest was interfaith. A Jewish professor at McGill was among those who argued the term was weaponized by opponents "to prevent us from criticizing Israel".
