= List of pro-Palestinian protests in the Netherlands =

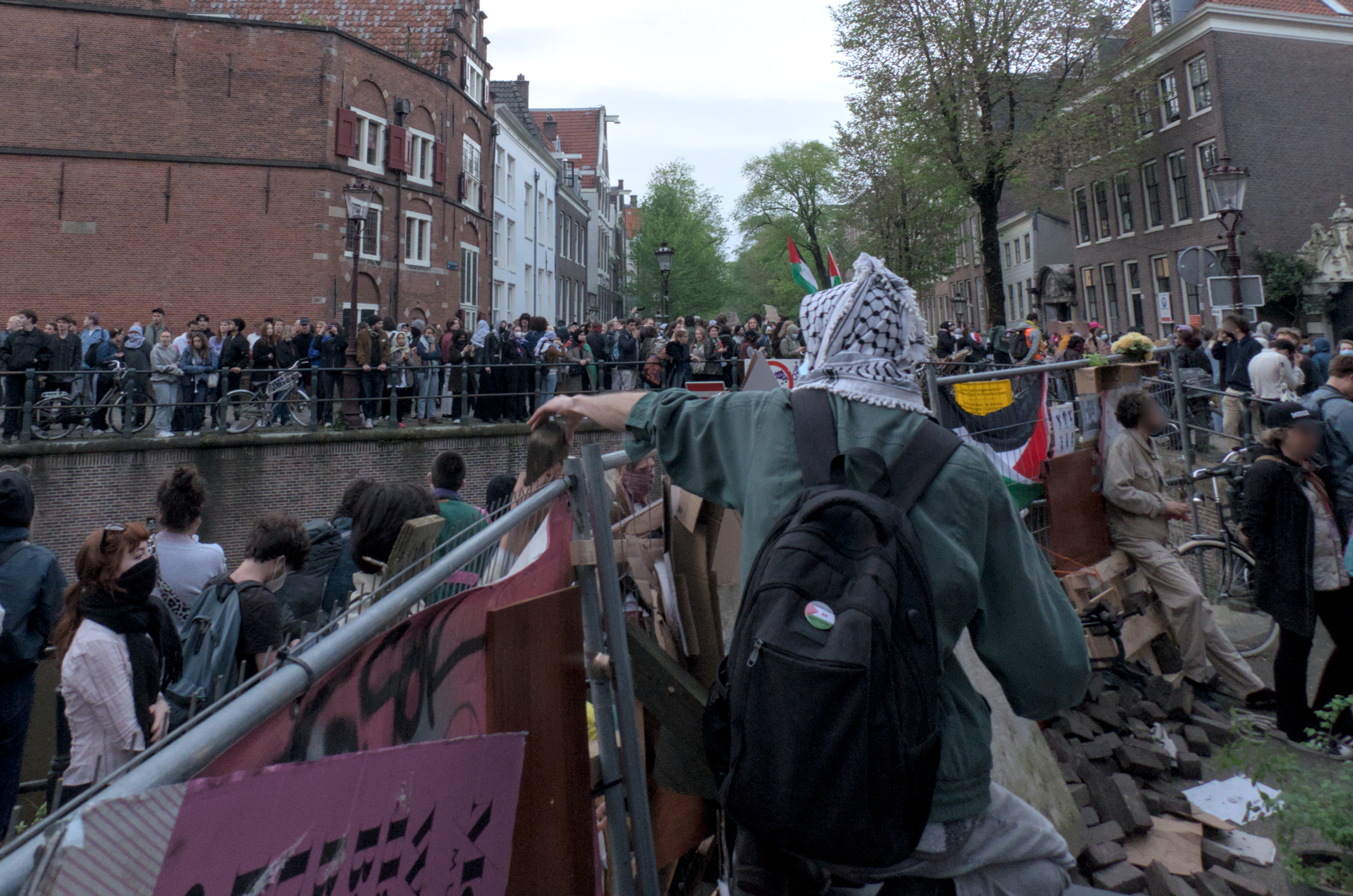
Barricades at the University of Amsterdam, 7 May 2024

This is a list of pro-Palestinian protests in the Netherlands including demonstrations, marches, sit-ins, direct actions, and campus encampments in support of Palestinian rights.

== List ==
Estimated attendance is either mentioned explicitly in the references or a midpoint is used, i.e., 50 when dozens are mentioned, 500 when hundreds are mentioned, and so on.

=== Pre-2000 ===
Date	Municipality	Estimated attendance	Description	Ref(s)
15 February 1970	Amsterdam	?	Demonstration against the visit of Abba Eban by activists from the Dutch Palestine Committee. Protesters shouted slogans such as "every bomb on Egypt is a mistake" and "justice for the Palestinians".	
2 May 1973	Amsterdam	?	Protest rally "25 years of Israel, 25 years of oppression of Palestinians" outside the Krasnapolsky hotel.	
3 May 1973	The Hague	50	Demonstration by the Dutch Palestine Committee against the detention of Palestinian political prisoners in Israel on the occasion of the 25th anniversary of the state of Israel.	
25 June 1974	The Hague	?	Protest outside the Israeli embassy against the Israeli air strikes on Palestinian refugee camps in southern Lebanon.	
3 October 1974	Amsterdam	?	Demonstration in solidarity with Palestinian political prisoners in Israel outside the Krasnapolsky hotel.	
20 March 1975	Alblasserdam	?	Demonstration outside Van der Giessen-de Noord shipyard by members of the Dutch Palestine Committee protesting against its supplying of patrol boats and war materials to Oman, the United States, and the United Kingdom.	
14 June 1975	Amsterdam	?	Demonstration at the Museumplein and march through the city center in support of liberation struggles in Oman and Palestine.	
15 May 1976	Amsterdam	?	Demonstration at the Museumplein and march through the city center.	
6 April 1977	Amsterdam	?	Demonstration outside the Van Gogh Museum protesting the mayor's decision to forbid the Dutch Palestine Committee from holding a street collection in Amsterdam for victims of Israeli strikes in Palestine and Lebanon.	
11 June 1977	Amsterdam	150	Demonstration at the Museumplein in support of resistance against the Israeli occupation of Palestine.	
11 May 1978	The Hague	?	Counter-protest to the commemoration of the 30 years of Israel where Princess Beatrix and Prince Claus were present. Ended with police intervention.	
13 May 1978	Amsterdam	400	Demonstration at the Museumplein.	
28 February 1979	Amsterdam	?	Demonstration outside Stadhuis van Amsterdam in protest of the Mayor's prohibition of a fundraiser by the Medical Committee Palestine.	
19 May 1979	Amsterdam	?	Demonstration in support of the Palestine Liberation Organization.	
1 August 1979	The Hague	?	Demonstration against the visit of Israeli Minister of Foreign Affairs Mosje Dajan.	
26 November 1979	Leiden	?	Demonstration and speeches by Palestinian speakers.	
29 November 1980	Utrecht	500	Demonstration in support of the Palestine Liberation Organization.	
27 March 1982	Amsterdam	?	Protest outside the El Al branch on the Rokin against attacks by Israel in Palestine and Lebanon.	
12 June 1982	Amsterdam	1,000	Demonstration against Israel's invasion of Lebanon and march in solidarity with Palestine.	
13 August 1982	The Hague	?	Protest at the Binnenhof in solidarity with Palestine and Lebanon. Protesters demanded sanctions and weapons embargo on Israel.	
22 September 1982	The Hague	?	Demonstration outside the Israeli embassy in solidarity with Palestine and Lebanon.	
25 September 1982	Amsterdam	3,000	Demonstration outside the Israeli embassy in solidarity with Palestine and Lebanon.	
10 April 1983	Amsterdam	?	Demonstration at the Dam Square on occasion of the murder of PLO diplomat Issam Sartawi.	
6 June 1987	Utrecht	?	Demonstration organized by the Dutch Palestine Committee.	
23 December 1987	Amsterdam	5,000	Demonstration under the slogans "Israel out of occupied territory", "for recognition of the right of self-determination of the Palestinian people", and "recognition of PLO by the Dutch government".	
24 March 1988	The Hague	?	Demonstration in solidarity with Palestinian people in revolt.	
13 December 1988	The Hague	?	Demonstration and march on the occasion of the 1st anniversary of the Intifada.	
9 December 1989	Amsterdam	150	Demonstration and march through the city center in solidarity with PLO. Protesters shouted slogans such as "stop the murder of the children" and "stop the occupation".	
29 October 1991	Amsterdam	50	Protest organized by the group "Geen Israëlische nederzettingen in Palestina" ("No Israeli settlements in Palestine") against supermarkets selling Israeli products grown in the occupied Palestinian territory such as Albert Heijn, Dirk van de Broek, and Hema. Ended with police intervention.	
21 March 1992	Rotterdam	50	Demonstration outside an event organized by the Christenen voor Israël against the construction of the Holland village on occupied territory near Jerusalem.	
27 March 1992	The Hague	?	Demonstration outside the Israeli Embassy.	
3 March 1993	The Hague	12	Protest against the visit of Israeli President Chaim Herzog.	
24 February 1995	The Hague	700	Demonstration and march through the city center.	
16 February 1996	The Hague	1,000	Demonstration and march through the city center.	

=== 2000-2022 ===
Date	Municipality	Estimated attendance	Description	Ref(s)
6 April 2002	Amsterdam	?	Demonstration in the city center.	
13 April 2002	Amsterdam	10,000	Demonstration in the city center. Ended with police intervention. 20 protesters were arrested. Some protesters and police officers were injured.	
27 March 2004	Amsterdam	100	Demonstration in the city center, included commemoration of Hamas leader Ahmed Yassin.	
16 July 2006	Amsterdam	?	Demonstration and march through the city center.	
31 December 2008	The Hague	500	March through the city center.	
3 January 2009	Amsterdam	5,000	Demonstration in the city center. One protester was arrested.	
9 January 2009	Rotterdam	500	Demonstration and march through the city center.	
15 January 2009	Utrecht	150	Demonstration in the city center.	
10 January 2009	Enschede	5	Demonstration by Enschede artists.	
17 January 2009	Amsterdam	200	Demonstration in the city center. Protesters threw shoes at the effigies of Ehud Olmert, George W. Bush, Hosni Mubarak and Jan Peter Balkenende.	
17 January 2009	Enschede	400	Silent march through the city center.	
31 May 2010	The Hague	500	Demonstration outside the Israeli embassy. Among the protesters was long-time pro-Palestine activist Gretta Duisenberg. Ended with police intervention.	
17 November 2012	Amsterdam	300	Demonstration in the city center.	
17 April 2013	Delft	?	Demonstration at the TU Delft campus in protest of collaboration with security company G4S, which was involved with Israel's "illegal activities against Palestinians".	
24 July 2014	The Hague	?	Demonstration in the Schilderswijk district.	
27 July 2014	Rotterdam	10,000	Demonstration and march through the city center.	
20 July 2014	Amsterdam	5,000	Demonstration and march through the city center.	
3 August 2014	Amsterdam	500	Demonstration and march through the city center.	
10 August 2014	Utrecht	1,000	Demonstration and march through the city center in protest of Israel's Operation Protective Edge.	
17 August 2014	Utrecht	800	Demonstration and march through the city center.	
23 August 2014	Amsterdam	500	Demonstration in the city center. One protester was arrested.	
31 August 2014	The Hague	250	Demonstration and march through the city center.	
11 July 2015	Amsterdam	1,000	Demonstration and march through the city center.	
8 December 2017	Amsterdam	50	Demonstration at the Leidseplein square against the decision of US President Donald Trump to recognize Jerusalem as the capital of Israel.	
12 May 2018	Rotterdam	50	March through the city center.	
19 May 2018	Amsterdam	500	March through the city center.	
7 October 2018	Amsterdam	?	Demonstration in the city center.	
19 May 2019	Amsterdam	?	March during the annual Women's March.	
19 May 2020	Amsterdam	200	Demonstration at the Museumplein.	
24 May 2020	Amsterdam	10	Demonstration at the Dam Square. Ended with police intervention. Two protesters were arrested.	
14 May 2021	Utrecht	500	Demonstration near the train station. Ended with police intervention due to a Public Demonstrations Act violation implemented at the time because of COVID-19. More than 100 protesters were arrested.	
15 May 2021	Nijmegen	200	Demonstration in the city center.	
15 May 2021	The Hague	500	Demonstrations at Plein, Malieveld, and Hofplaats. Ended with police intervention. Five protesters were arrested.	
16 May 2021	Groningen	200	Demonstration at the Grote Markt.	
16 May 2021	Amsterdam	500	Demonstration and march through the city center.	
16 May 2021	Eindhoven	500	Demonstration near the train station.	
16 May 2021	Enschede	500	Demonstration in the city center.	
19 May 2021	Utrecht	430	Petition from academics of the Utrecht University and the Utrecht Medical Center to call for a boycott of Israeli institutions.	
21 May 2021	The Hague	200	Demonstration in the city center. Ended with police intervention. Six protesters were arrested.	
23 May 2021	Utrecht	?	Demonstration near the train station.	
23 May 2021	Breda	250	Demonstration in the city center.	
23 April 2022	The Hague	?	March through the city center.	
10 May 2022	Amersfoort	?	Disruption of a concert by members of the Israeli army.	
16 June 2022	Utrecht	?	Silent protest at the academic library courtyard of the Utrecht University.	
13 August 2022	Utrecht	?	Demonstration near the train station.	
14 December 2022	Utrecht	20	Teach-in at the Educatorium building of the Utrecht University in protest of the arrival of the an Israeli delegation from the Atudot Le'Israël program for education.	

=== 2023 ===
Date	Municipality	Estimated attendance	Description	Ref(s)
11 February 2023	Rotterdam	50	Demonstration and march through the city center.	
15 May 2023	Amsterdam	?	Demonstration at Vrije Universiteit Amsterdam.	
8 October 2023	Rotterdam	500	March through the city center.	
8 October 2023	The Hague	?	Demonstration in the city center.	
9 October 2023	Doetinchem	?	Car parade through the city center, with protesters honking and waving Palestinian flags.	
14 October 2023	Eindhoven	500	Demonstration and march through the city center.	
15 October 2023	Amsterdam	15,000	Demonstration and march through the city center.	
16 October 2023	Utrecht	?	Projection of the Palestinian flag on the Dom Tower by activists from Extinction Rebellion.	
18 October 2023	Nijmegen	30	Demonstration at Erasmusplein of the Radboud University.	
18 October 2023	The Hague	500	Night protest in front of the Israeli embassy.	
18 October 2023	Utrecht	7,000	Night march through the city centre.	
20 October 2023	Tilburg	200	Demonstration in front of the Tilburg train station.	
21 October 2023	Groningen	300	Rally at the Grote Markt.	
22 October 2023	Breda	200	March through the city center.	
23 October 2023	The Hague	?	Occupation of the entrance to the International Criminal Court. Ended with police intervention. 19 protesters were arrested.	
27 October 2023	Utrecht	30	Demonstration at the University Library City Center. Protesters unfurled large flags and banners from the top floor with messages condemning the university's neutrality and demanding a boycott of Israeli institutions.	
28 October 2023	Zwolle	200	Demonstration and march through the city center.	
29 October 2023	Venlo	100	March through the city center.	
29 October 2023	Eindhoven	500	Silent march at night through the city center.	
29 October 2023	The Hague	6,000	March through the city center.	
4 November 2023	Zwolle	500	Demonstration and march through the city center.	
5 November 2023	Haarlem	50	Demonstration and march through the city center.	
5 November 2023	Amersfoort	500	March through the city center.	
7 November 2023	Amsterdam	500	Sit-in at Amsterdam Central Station.	
9 November 2023	The Hague	100	Teach-in at the Wijnhaven building of the Leiden University. The university's security tried to block students from speaking, but eventually the demonstration was allowed to continue.	
9 November 2023	Arnhem	500	Demonstration in the city center.	
9 November 2023	Utrecht	500	Sit-in at Utrecht Central Station.	
12 November 2023	Amsterdam	?	Greta Thunberg gives a speech about Palestine in Amsterdam Museumplein during the climate march and gets interrupted by a climate protester.	
14 November 2023	Haarlemmermeer	200	Demonstration at the Schipol Airport.	
15 November 2023	Groningen	?	Sit-in at Groningen Central Station.	
15 November 2023	Utrecht	50	Sit-in in the lobby of the University Library at Utrecht Science Park.	
16 November 2023	Utrecht	?	Sit in at the train station.	
16 November 2023	Nijmegen	100	Occupation of the Nijmegen train station.	
16 November 2023	Amsterdam	500	Sit-in at Amsterdam Central Station.	
18 November 2023	Enschede	500	Demonstration and march through the city center.	
19 November 2023	Rotterdam	7,000	March through the city center. Five people were arrested after confrontations with pro-Israel counter-protesters.	
21 November 2023	Nijmegen	?	Defacing of the windows of the university library of the Radboud University with red paint.	
26 November 2023	Arnhem	1,000	Demonstration and march through the city center.	
29 November 2023	Delft	50	Demonstration by students and staff at the Technical University of Delft.	
29 November 2023	Maastricht	60	Demonstration in front of UM administration building of the Maastricht University.	
7 December 2023	Groningen	50	Demonstration at Groningen Central Station. Ended by police intervention. Two protesters were arrested.	
7 December 2023	Amsterdam	500	Sit-in at night at Amsterdam Central Station.	
10 December 2023	The Hague	500	Demonstration and march through the city center.	
11 December 2023	Utrecht	?	Disruption of a meeting by the Utrecht University Council in front of the Administration Building by a noise demonstration outside.	
16 December 2023	Leerdam	700	Demonstration and march through the city center. Some protesters were thrown eggs at.	
17 December 2023	The Hague	500	Demonstration and march towards the ICC in protest of a court rejection to stop the government from sending F-35 fighter jet parts to Israel.	
21 December 2023	The Hague	150	Demonstration by civil servants in front of the Ministry of Foreign Affairs.	
22 December 2023	Gouda	?	Demonstration in the city center.	
23 December 2023	Amsterdam	?	Demonstration at the De Bijenkorf shopping mall.	
30 December 2023	Eindhoven	500	Demonstration and march through the city center.	

=== 2024 ===
Date	Municipality	Estimated attendance	Description	Ref(s)
3 January 2024	Eindhoven	100	Demonstration and march through the city center.	
7 January 2024	Groningen	100	Demonstration and march through the city center.	
11 January 2024	The Hague	800	Demonstration outside UN court genocide hearings at the International Court of Justice.	
13 January 2024	Amsterdam	?	Demonstration with thousands of shoes symbolizing 10,000 Palestinian children killed by Israel.	
18 January 2024	Eindhoven	?	Sit in at the train station.	
18 January 2024	Amsterdam	100	Sit-in at the Roeterseiland building of the University of Amsterdam.	
23 January 2024	Breda	30	Sit-in at the train station against the role of Thales in the genocide of Palestinians.	
26 January 2024	Amersfoort	75	Sit-in at the train station.	
26 January 2024	The Hague	500	March from the train station to the International Court of Justice.	
28 January 2024	Eindhoven	?	Demonstration in the city center.	
2 February 2024	(Netherlands) Multiple	?	Sit-in at 15 train stations across the country.	
8 February 2024	Hilversum	15	Sit-in at the train station.	
8 February 2024	The Hague	60	Sit-in at the train station.	
15 February 2024	Gouda	50	Sit-in outside the train station.	
17 February 2024	Amsterdam	5,000	Demonstration and march through the city center.	
24 February 2024	's-Hertogenbosch	?	Demonstration and march through the city center.	
29 February 2024	Breda	50	Demonstration in the train station.	
2 March 2024	Zwolle	100	Demonstration and march through the city center.	
3 March 2024	Rotterdam	?	Demonstration in front of the Rotterdam City Hall.	
5 March 2024	The Hague	25	Disruption of a debate and demonstration at the House of Representatives. Ended with police intervention.	
8 March 2024	The Hague	70	Blocking of the intersection between Theresiastraat and Prins Clauslaan	
12 March 2024	Groningen	?	Demonstration in front of the Academy Building of the University of Groningen.	
12 March 2024	Nijmegen	100	Demonstration at the Erasmus Square of the Radboud University.	
16 March 2024	Breda	?	Silent march through the city center.	
17 March 2024	Eindhoven	?	Demonstration and march through the city center.	
17 March 2024	Utrecht	?	Demonstration with thousands of shoes symbolizing 13000 Palestinian children killed by Israel.	
18 March 2024	The Hague	?	Defacing of the facade of the Ministry of Foreign Affairs with red paint.	
23 March 2024	Leiden	500	Demonstration and march through the city center.	
25 March 2024	Amsterdam	50	Blocking of the entrance and bridge to Amsterdam University College. Lasted until 28 March. Ended with police intervention. 17 protesters were arrested. Some protesters were injured.	
26 March 2024	Utrecht	70	Disruption of the anniversary celebration of the Utrecht University at the Dom Church.	
28 March 2024	Amsterdam	?	Defacing of the facade of an ING Bank office.	
30 March 2024	Amsterdam	500	Demonstration in the city center.	
2 April 2024	Eindhoven	10	Disruption of a meeting at the council chamber.	
3 April 2024	Hengelo	50	Demonstration in front of Thales headquarters.	
9 April 2024	Nijmegen	?	Demonstration in the Refter building of the Radboud University.	
11 April 2024	Middelburg	70	March through the city center.	
12 April 2024	Achtkarspelen	4	Counter-demonstration against journalist and IDF soldier Hananya Naftali.	
13 April 2024	Nijmegen	?	Defacing of the facade and windows of Academy Building, the University Library, and the Rölling Building of the Radboud University.	
13 April 2024	Amsterdam	100	Demonstration in front of AFAS Live in protest of Israel's participation in the Eurovision Song Contest.	
15 April 2024	Utrecht	50	Blocking of the road near the ring road in Overvecht.	
16 April 2024	Tilburg	?	Blocking of the Dante building of the Tilburg University.	
17 April 2024	Amsterdam	?	Demonstration at the University of Amsterdam.	
30 April 2024	Amersfoort	?	Demonstration in front of the Christian Union party office.	
6 May 2024	Amsterdam	5,000	Encampment at the Roeterseiland campus of the University of Amsterdam. Israeli counter-protesters threw flares and fireworks at the protesters. Lasted until the early hours of 7 May. Ended with police intervention and bulldozers were used to demolish barricades. 169 protesters were arrested. Some protesters and a police officer were injured.	
7 May 2024	Delft	50	Encampment at the campus of the Delft University of Technology. Ended by police intervention.	
7 May 2024	Utrecht	100	Encampment in the academic library courtyard of the Utrecht University. Lasted until early hours of 8 May. Ended by police intervention. 50 protesters were arrested.	
7 May 2024	Amsterdam	5,000	Occupation of the Oudemanhuispoort campus of the University of Amsterdam. Lasted until 8 May. Ended with police intervention and bulldozers were used to demolish barricades. Demonstration continued at Rokin, also ended with police intervention. 36 protesters were arrested. Some protesters and police officers were injured.	
8 May 2024	Utrecht	100	Occupation of a building of the Utrecht University at the Drift. Lasted until early hours of 9 May. Ended by police intervention. Three protesters were arrested.	
9 May 2024	Apeldoorn	?	Flying of three planes with banners saying "Free Palestine" and messages against prime minister Mark Rutte.	
9 May 2024	Utrecht	?	March through the city center in response to the police violence of the previous days.	
9 May 2024	Amsterdam	5,000	Demonstration at the Roeterseiland campus of the University of Amsterdam and march through the city center. Ended with police intervention. Three protesters were arrested.	
11 May 2024	Amsterdam	10,000	Demonstration and march through the city center. Counter-protesters attacked protesters with beer bottles and fireworks. Ten counter-protesters were arrested for public violence and assault.	
13 May 2024	(Netherlands) Multiple	1,000	National walk-out by students and staff of multiple Dutch universities.	
13 May 2024	Nijmegen	200	Encampment on the campus of the Radboud University. The protest was attended by Israeli researcher Maya Wind, which spoke to staff and answered questions. Lasted until 5 June, ended by police intervention.	
13 May 2024	Maastricht	50	Encampment by the grounds of the Faculty of Cultural and Social Sciences of the Maastricht University. Lasted until 22 May. Ended by protesters disbanding on their own.	
13 May 2024	Groningen	50	Encampment by the Harmonie building of the University of Groningen. Lasted until 12 June. Ended by protesters disbanding on their own.	
13 May 2024	Amsterdam	1,000	Walk-out by students and staff of the University of Amsterdam, and subsequent occupation of campus buildings of the university. Ended with police intervention. One protester was arrested.	
14 May 2024	Eindhoven	25	Disruption of the EU election debate at the Eindhoven University.	
15 May 2024	Breda	?	Sit-in at the train station.	
15 May 2024	Wageningen	40	Encampment at a bridge on the campus of the Wageningen University & Research. Lasted until 27 November. Ended with police intervention.	
15 May 2024	Almere	50	Demonstration at the train station.	
15 May 2024	Enschede	70	Demonstration at the train station started by students of the University of Twente.	
15 May 2024	Amsterdam	500	Sit-in by the Booking.com headquarters on Oosterdokskade.	
15 May 2024	Utrecht	500	Occupation of the Janskerkhof 15a building of the Utrecht University. Ended with police intervention. 42 protesters were arrested.	
16 May 2024	Maastricht	6	Protesters of the Maastricht encampment announce a hunger strike. Lasted until 22 May. Ended due to health complications.	
16 May 2024	Rotterdam	500	Demonstration at the Rotterdam Central Station.	
16 May 2024	Tilburg	500	Demonstration and march across the campus of Tilburg University.	
17 May 2024	Leiden	25	Occupation of the grounds of the Academy Building and Hortus Botanicus of the Leiden University. Ended by protesters disbanding on their own.	
17 May 2024	Amsterdam	50	Encampment at the Roeterseiland campus of the University of Amsterdam. Ended with police intervention. Demonstration continued at Stopera, also ended with police intervention. One protester was arrested.	
17 May 2024	Amsterdam	150	Demonstration by students and staff of the Vrije Universiteit Amsterdam.	
21 May 2024	Groningen	?	Demonstration during the lustrum celebration of the University of Groningen.	
22 May 2024	Maastricht	?	Occupation of a building of the Faculty of Arts and Social Sciences at Maastricht University. Ended by protesters disbanding on their own.	
22 May 2024	Tilburg	20	Encampment at the campus of the Tilburg University. Lasted until 13 June. Ended by protesters disbanding on their own.	
22 May 2024	Nijmegen	50	Sit-in in the Maria Montessori building of the Radboud University.	
24 May 2024	Tilburg	50	March through the campus of the Tilburg University.	
25 May 2024	Amsterdam	100	Demonstration at a building from the University of Amsterdam at the Spui, and subsequent march through the city center.	
27 May 2024	Nijmegen	50	Occupation of the Erasmus building of the Radboud University. Two protesters were arrested on suspicion of vandalism. Lasted until the early hours of 28 May. Ended by police intervention.	
28 May 2024	Tilburg	50	Die-in in the library and the Cube building of the Tilburg University.	
30 May 2024	Rotterdam	?	Encampment and protests at the Woudestein campus of the Erasmus University Rotterdam. Lasted until 9 June. Ended by protesters disbanding on their own.	
31 May 2024	Nijmegen	?	Occupation of the office of the president of the executive board of Radboud University in response to the refusal of the executive board discussing the ties with Israeli institutes. Lasted a couple of hours.	
2 June 2024	Utrecht	150	Demonstration by the Janskerkhof buildings of the Utrecht University.	
3 June 2024	Delft	30	Occupation of a building of the Mechanical Engineering faculty of the Delft University of Technology. Ended with police intervention. 15 protesters were arrested.	
3 June 2024	Amsterdam	10	Encampment at the campus of the VU Amsterdam. Lasted until 10 June. Ended with police intervention.	
4 June 2024	The Hague	30	Occupation of a building of the Universiteiten van Nederland. Ended with police intervention. 30 protesters were arrested.	
5 June 2024	Tilburg	?	Protest at the Fontys School of Fine and Performing Arts of the Tilburg University.	
6 June 2024	The Hague	?	Defacing of the Ministry of Education, Culture and Science with red paint.	
6 June 2024	The Hague	50	March through the city center. Ended with police intervention.	
9 June 2024	Rotterdam	500	Demonstration and march through the city center.	
12 June 2024	Eindhoven	?	Demonstration at the campus of the Technical University of Eindhoven.	
12 June 2024	Groningen	50	Demonstration, march through the city center, and brief occupation of the administration building of the University of Groningen. Ended with police intervention. Several protesters were injured including one becoming unconscious.	
18 June 2024	Groningen	100	Demonstration at the campus of the University of Groningen against the university's ties with Israeli institutes and in response to the police violence used in the previous protest.	
21 June 2024	Amsterdam	?	Occupation of the Nieuwe Achtergracht building of the University of Amsterdam. Ended with riot police intervention. 13 protesters were arrested.	
23 June 2024	Utrecht	?	Defacing of the Bestuursgebouw with red paint.	
25 June 2024	Utrecht	?	Demonstration by students and staff of the Utrecht University. Some protesters defaced the entrance of the Drift 25 building with messages such as "blood on your hands" and "UU funds Gaza genocide".	
2 July 2024	Eindhoven	5	Disruption of a meeting at the council chamber.	
6 July 2024	Utrecht	50	Demonstration in front of the Kromhout Barracks, with some protesters setting up tents outside and climbing to the roof of the building.	
14 July 2024	Amsterdam	?	Occupation of a vacant building in Osdorp by Palestine Action Amsterdam.	
16 July 2024	Nijmegen	20	Demonstration by the soldier march to Camp Heumensoord.	
20 July 2024	Leiden	80	Demonstration and march through the city center.	
21 July 2024	The Hague	?	Demonstration with thousands of shoes in the Grote Markt symbolizing Palestinian children killed by Israel.	
21 July 2024	Eindhoven	30	Disruption of the RoboCup 2024 awards ceremony.	
29 July 2024	Amsterdam	?	Defacing of the facade of the Royal Palace of Amsterdam with red paint.	
31 August 2024	Amersfoort	200	Demonstration and march through the city center.	
2 September 2024	Eindhoven	?	Demonstration at the Auditorium of the Eindhoven University of Technology.	
6 September 2024	Amsterdam	400	Demonstration at the Roeterseiland campus and march towards the Maagdenhuis of the University of Amsterdam.	
14 September 2024	Oss	200	Demonstration outside Four Winds, a company which protesters claim trains and send attack dogs to Israel to be used against Palestinians.	
24 September 2024	Utrecht	50	Blocking of the Kromhout Barracks. Ended with protesters disbanding on their own after the cancelation of a meeting of the Ministry of Defence that was scheduled to take place there.	
28 September 2024	Eindhoven	?	Demonstration and march through the city center. One protester was arrested.	
29 September 2024	Amsterdam	500	Demonstration in the city center.	
3 October 2024	Gouda	?	Demonstration outside the train station.	
5 October 2024	Amsterdam	750	Demonstration and march through the city center.	
7 October 2024	Amsterdam	6	Defacing of the entrance to the headquarters of Booking.com.	
7 October 2024	Utrecht	?	Sit-in at the train station and march through the city center.	
7 October 2024	Amsterdam	?	Demonstration in the city center. Ended with riot police intervention. 26 protesters were arrested on suspicion of offenses including insults, vandalism, and assault. Later, at least 320 protesters were also arrested.	
7 October 2024	Haarlem	30	Sit-in at the train station.	
7 October 2024	Breda	40	Sit-in at the train station.	
7 October 2024	's-Hertogenbosch	60	Sit-in at the train station.	
7 October 2024	Amsterdam	300	Sit-in at the train station.	
8 October 2024	The Hague	?	Demonstration outside the Wijnhaven Building in the Hague of the Leiden University.	
8 October 2024	Leiden	?	Demonstration outside the Lipsius Building of the Leiden University.	
10 October 2024	The Hague	?	Demonstration by public servants in front of the Ministry of Foreign Affairs.	
13 October 2024	Amsterdam	1,500	Demonstration and march through the city center.	
15 October 2024	Breda	?	Sit-in at the train station.	
17 October 2024	Gouda	?	Demonstration in the city center.	
17 October 2024	Utrecht	500	Demonstration and night march through the city center.	
27 October 2024	Eindhoven	10	Demonstration outside the Albert Heijn XL. Ended with police intervention.	
29 October 2024	Purmerend	15	Counter-demonstration outside the Purmerend library in protest of a book showcase by author Natascha van Weezel.	
31 October 2024	Haarlem	?	Demonstration on the side of the road.	
9 November 2024	Utrecht	?	Demonstration and march through the city center.	
9 November 2024	Groningen	200	Demonstration in the city center for Palestine and Lebanon.	
10 November 2024	Amsterdam	500	Demonstration in the city center in response to the attacks by Maccabi Tel Aviv F.C. hooligans on 7 November. Ended with riot police intervention. More than 50 protesters were arrested and 340 were transported somewhere else. Some protesters were injured, including a woman sustaining a head injury made by a police baton. The Amsterdam City Council denied any police brutality.	
14 November 2024	Groningen	?	Demonstration during the student protests on the Grote Markt.	
15 November 2024	Utrecht	?	Occupation of the Drift 13 building during the Open Day. Ended with police intervention.	
15 November 2024	Eindhoven	250	March through the city center at night during the GLOW light festival.	
21 November 2024	Rotterdam	?	Disruption of annual arms fair and dousing of fake blood on the facade of the Rotterdam Ahoy. Ended with police intervention. Thirteen protesters were arrested.	
21 November 2024	Arnhem	500	Night march through the city center for Palestine and Lebanon.	
21 November 2024	Utrecht	1,000	Demonstration and march through the city center.	
26 November 2024	Hilversum	20	Blocking of the entrance to an NOS newsroom. Some activists climbed to the roof. Ended by protesters disbanding on their own.	
26 November 2024	Eindhoven	30	Demonstration against a lecture by an invited professor from the Technion University.	
30 November 2024	Amsterdam	1,000	Demonstration and march through the city center.	
10 December 2024	Castricum	?	Demonstration outside the train station.	
16 December 2024	Nijmegen	?	Attempted demonstration at the Radboud University, stopped by police intervention. Six protesters, including two university employees, were arrested on a city bus on suspicion of possible vandalism. The protest was canceled due to high police presence on campus and the activists reporting feeling unsafe because of it.	

=== 2025 ===
Date	Municipality	Estimated attendance	Description	Ref(s)
7 January 2025	Castricum	12	Demonstration outside the train station.	
11 January 2025	Amersfoort	6	Counter-protest in the city center.	
16 January 2025	Utrecht	?	Sit-in at Utrecht Central Station and march through the city center.	
30 January 2025	Tilburg	40	Campus occupation and protests at Tilburg University.	
31 January 2025	Groningen	?	Disruption of University of Groningen's Open Day.	
11 February 2025	Amsterdam	60	Demonstration in support of invited speaker UN Special Rapporteur Francesca Albanese in front of the Dominicuskerk. About 15 pro-Israel counter-protesters were present.	
18 February 2025	Delft	?	Blocking of the entrance to the Aula building of TU Delft. The activists protested the presence of fossil fuel and arms companies, specifically companies supplying weapons to Israel. Ended with police intervention. Eleven protesters were arrested.	
27 February 2025	Tilburg	50	Sit-in by students and teachers of at Tilburg University.	
4 March 2025	Utrecht	50	Blocking of the Bestuursgebouw building of the Utrecht University and demonstration in front of it.	
11 March 2025	Nijmegen	40	Disruption of a lecture by Zionist Rawan Osman at Radboud University.	
18 March 2025	Rotterdam	?	Demonstration outside the train station.	
18 March 2025	Gouda	20	Demonstration outside the train station.	
18 March 2025	Utrecht	50	Demonstration and march through the city center.	
18 March 2025	Nijmegen	50	Demonstration between the Maria Montessori Building and the Lecture Halls Complex of the Radboud University. Ended with police intervention. Two protesters were arrested.	
18 March 2025	Amsterdam	100	Sit-in at Amsterdam Central Station and march through the city center.	
19 March 2025	Amsterdam	50	Blocking of the Blauwbrug bridge.	
20 March 2025	Utrecht	?	Blocking of the Bestuursgebouw building of the Utrecht University.	
24 March 2025	Amsterdam	?	Demonstration and writing of pro-Palestine messages with chalk on the Roeterseilandcampus of the University of Amsterdam.	
5 April 2025	's-Hertogenbosch	?	Demonstration in the city center against Caterpillar's role in the occupation of Palestine.	
8 April 2025	Amsterdam	?	Demonstration against the deportation of pro-Palestinian activists from Germany.	
9 April 2025	Amsterdam	?	Occupation of the BelleVUe building at Vrije Universiteit Amsterdam. Seven protesters were arrested.	
9 April 2025	Rotterdam	20-30	Blocking of train tracks at the Port of Rotterdam by Geef Tegengas activists demanding a full weapons embargo on Israel. Ended with police intervention. Seventeen protesters were arrested.	
10 April 2025	Tilburg	?	Sit-in at the train station.	
10 April 2025	Eindhoven	?	Sit-in at the train station.	
10 April 2025	Rotterdam	?	Sit-in at the train station.	
10 April 2025	Zaanstad	?	Demonstration at the train station.	
10 April 2025	's-Hertogenbosch	50	Sit-in at the train station.	
10 April 2025	Enschede	55	Demonstration at the train station.	
14 April 2025	Rotterdam	?	Defacing of windows of an Allianz office in protest of its ties with Israeli arms producer Elbit Systems. Activists smashed the windows and sprayed red paint.	
14 April 2025	Nijmegen	40	Occupation of the air bridge between De Refter and the University Library of the Radboud University. Lasted until 15 April. Ended by protesters disbanding on their own.	
14 April 2025	Amsterdam	50	Occupation of the Maagdenhuis building of the University of Amsterdam. Ended with police intervention. Ten protesters were arrested.	
20 April 2025	Rotterdam	10,000	Demonstration and march through the city center.	
22 April 2025	Lelystad	?	Counter-demonstration against an event organized by the Christenen voor Israël at an Evangelical church.	
30 April 2025	Nijmegen	1	Protest by a climber at a chimney tower of the former boiler house at Radboudumc. Lasted for several hours. Ended with police intervention.	
4 May 2025	Amsterdam	6	Disruption of the celebration of the Remembrance of the Dead. Ended with police intervention. Six activists were arrested.	
5 May 2025	Wageningen	250	Demonstration against Prime Minister Dick Schoof, Speaker of the House of Representatives Martin Bosma, and other cabinet members during celebrations of the Liberation Day.	
6 May 2025	The Hague	200	Occupation of the Wijnhaven building of the Leiden University in The Hague. Ended with police intervention. 75 protesters were arrested.	
7 May 2025	Nijmegen	?	Occupation of the Berchmanianum building of the Radboud University Nijmegen. Ended with police intervention. Three protesters were arrested, some protesters were injured including one protester bitten by a police dog that had to be hospitalized.	
7 May 2025	Utrecht	?	Encampment in the academic library courtyard of the Utrecht University. Lasted until 19 May. Ended by protesters disbanding on their own.	
11 May 2025	Helmond	?	Demonstration and march through the city center.	
13 May 2025	Nijmegen	50	Encampment near the Huygens building of the Radboud University Nijmegen. Lasted until 1 June. Ended by protesters disbanding on their own.	
13 May 2025	Rotterdam	20	Encampment at the Erasmus Plaza of the Erasmus University Rotterdam. Lasted until 1 June. Ended by protesters disbanding on their own.	
14 May 2025	Katwijk	?	Counter-demonstration against a pro-Israel service outside the Nieuwe Kerk. Clashes ensued between pro-Palestine and pro-Israel demonstrators. Ended with police intervention. At least one protester was injured.	
15 May 2025	Amsterdam	?	Sit-in at the Vrije Universiteit Amsterdam.	
15 May 2025	Nijmegen	?	Disruption protest during the dies natalis at the Radboud University.	
15 May 2025	Tilburg	?	Occupation of the Dante building of the Tilburg University.	
17 May 2025	Amsterdam	?	Defacing of the facade of the Royal Tropical Institute with red paint in protest of a meeting with the Israeli lobby Center for Information and Documentation Israel to be held there the following day.	
18 May 2025	Amsterdam	100	Demonstration outside the Royal Tropical Institute in protest of the 50th anniversary celebration of the Israeli lobby Center for Information and Documentation Israel being held there.	
18 May 2025	Katwijk	5	Demonstration outside the Nieuwe Kerk despite ban by the mayor.	
18 May 2025	Castricum	45	Human chain near the shopping center.	
18 May 2025	The Hague	100,000	Red line demonstration, with protesters wearing red clothing.	
19 May 2025	Utrecht	50	Occupation of the Drift 13 building of the Utrecht University. Ended with police intervention. 49 protesters were arrested. Some protesters were injured.	
20 May 2025	Nijkerk	30	Counter-demonstration against an event organized by the Christians for Israel.	
22 May 2025	Apeldoorn	50	March through the city center.	
23 May 2025	Katwijk	5	Demonstration outside the town hall. A pro-Israel counter-demonstrator threw a bag of dog feces at the protesters.	
23 May 2025	Nijmegen	20	Occupation of the library of the Radboud University. Ended with police intervention.	
25 May 2025	Maastricht	30	Blocking of the entrances to multiple faculties of the Maastricht University.	
26 May 2025	Barneveld	80	Counter-demonstration at the Harselaar Industrial Estate during a Christians for Israel rally. There were confrontations between protesters and counter-protesters, with stones being thrown at one another.	
27 May 2025	Nijmegen	?	Disruption of a lecture by Juan Caldes Rodriguez at the Radboud University.	
29 May 2025	Veenendaal	?	Counter-demonstration at the De Basiliek during a Christians for Israel event where former Israeli army major Amir Tsarfati was speaking.	
31 May 2025	Hilversum	100	Demonstration held at the main office of the NOS.	
2 June 2025	Amsterdam	50	Encampment at Roeterseiland campus of the University of Amsterdam. Lasted until 20 June. Ended by protesters disbanding on their own.	
3 June 2025	Amsterdam	?	Encampment at Vrije Universiteit Amsterdam campus. Lasted until 11 June. Ended by riot police eviction. Two protesters were arrested. One protester was injured and hospitalized.	
3 June 2025	Eindhoven	?	Spray-painting of the administration building of Eindhoven University of Technology.	
3 June 2025	Utrecht	30	Occupation of the Janskerkhof 15a building of the Utrecht University. Lasted until 4 June. Ended with police intervention.	
4 June 2025	Rotterdam	100	Protest in front of the city hall against the role of the port of Rotterdam in shipping F-35 fighter jet parts via Maersk to be used by Israel. Ended with police intervention, 93 protesters were arrested, several were injured.	
5 June 2025	Nijmegen	?	Defacing of windows of the Academy Building of the Radboud University.	
5 June 2025	Delft	100	Occupation of the TU Delft Library of the Delft University of Technology. Protests ended with police intervention.	
7 June 2025	Apeldoorn	150	Demonstration and march through the city center.	
8 June 2025	Rotterdam	500	Demonstration and march through the city center.	
9 June 2025	The Hague	300	Demonstration in front of the Ministry of Foreign Affairs. Ended with police intervention.	
11 June 2025	The Hague	49	Demonstration in front of the Ministry of Foreign Affairs. Dutch media editors signed a joint letter urging Foreign Minister Caspar Veldkamp to take action to protect Palestinian journalists.	
11 June 2025	Hilversum	100	Counter-demonstration against a lecture by Zionist Shadi Khalloul organized by the Christenen voor Israël.	
12 June 2025	Utrecht	50	Occupation of a building of the Utrecht School of the Arts. Ended by protesters disbanding on their own.	
14 June 2025	Oss	500	Demonstration and march through the city center.	
15 June 2025	Hilversum	400	Demonstration by schoolchildren and their parents in the city center.	
15 June 2025	The Hague	150,000	Second red line demonstration, with protesters wearing red clothing.	
17 June 2025	Middelburg	?	Demonstration at the test day of bus company EBS, a subsidiary of the Israeli company Egged. Protesters painted the tires with red paint, pasted pamphlets on the windows, and set off a red smoke bomb.	
18 June 2025	Utrecht	30	Occupation of the Drift 25 building of the Utrecht University. Lasted until 20 June. Ended by protesters disbanding on their own.	
19 June 2025	Wageningen	?	Blocking of the Atlas building of the Wageningen University & Research.	
22 June 2025	The Hague	500	Demonstration outside the venue of the NATO summit. Ended with police intervention.	
23 June 2025	The Hague	?	Attempted blockade of the A44 motorway. Almost 30 activists were arrested.	
24 June 2025	Rotterdam	50	Blocking of the port railway line in protest against the Port Authority and NATO. Ended with police intervention, four protesters were arrested.	
24 June 2025	Rotterdam	50	Demonstration against the role of the port of Rotterdam in shipping F-35 fighter jet parts via Maersk to be used by Israel. Ended with police intervention, at least 5 protesters were arrested.	
24 June 2025	The Hague	500	Multiple protests, including a pro-Palestinian and anti-NATO protest dubbed the 'Bloc (NATO) Party'. A different protest included a large pro-Palestinian banner being raised near the Binnenhof. A die-in was held at the beach of Scheveningen.	
25 June 2025	Maastricht	?	Defacing of the facade of the law faculty of the Maastricht University with red paint.	
25 June 2025	The Hague	500	An A12 blockade, held during the 2025 The Hague NATO summit. Also smaller protests elsewhere, including Scheveningen.	
27 June 2025	Papendrecht	?	Demonstration in front of Fokker headquarters against the company's involvement in producing F-35 jet parts for the Israeli army.	
27 June 2025	Doetinchem	50	Demonstration by the stairs outside the Doetinchem City Hall.	
29 June 2025	Almere	?	Demonstration with thousands of shoes symbolizing 18,000 Palestinian children killed by Israel.	
5 July 2025	Papendrecht	60	March through the city towards Fokker headquarters.	
8 July 2025	Utrecht	250	Demonstration by Christians in front of the Protestant Church of the Netherlands.	
17 July 2025	Utrecht	?	Disruption of a council meeting at the municipality after two motions to sanction Israel were rejected.	
18 July 2025	Amersfoort	?	Silent protest and march through the city center.	
21 July 2025	Rotterdam	?	Defacing of windows of an Allianz office in protest of its ties with Israeli arms producer Elbit Systems. Activists smashed the windows and sprayed red paint.	
23 July 2025	Gouda	?	Defacing of windows of shops and restaurants such as Burger King, McDonald's, Jumbo, and H&M in the city center.	
24 July 2025	(Netherlands) Multiple	5,000	Noise demonstrations and sit-ins in at least 26 train stations across the country. Some included marches through the city centers.	
24 July 2025	Utrecht	?	Reading the names of the victims killed since 7 October 2023. Lasted until 29 July.	
25 July 2025	The Hague	?	Start of the continuous 24-hour livestreamed vigil in front of the Ministry of Foreign Affairs. Still ongoing.	
25 July 2025	Breda	100	Noise demonstration at the train station.	
30 July 2025	Amsterdam	100	Noise demonstration (cacerolazo) at Spui square.	
31 July 2025	Alkmaar	?	Demonstration in front of the city hall.	
31 July 2025	Ede	?	Noise demonstration outside the train station.	
31 July 2025	Hoorn	?	Noise demonstration outside the train station.	
31 July 2025	Dordrecht	35	Noise demonstration outside the train station.	
31 July 2025	Hardenberg	40	Sit-in on the train station square.	
31 July 2025	Lelystad	50	Noise demonstration outside the train station.	
31 July 2025	Zwolle	50	Noise demonstration at the train station and march through the city center.	
31 July 2025	Almere	50	Noise demonstration at the train station.	
31 July 2025	Wageningen	100	Noise demonstration at the train station.	
31 July 2025	Haarlem	150	Noise demonstration at the train station.	
31 July 2025	Utrecht	500	Noise demonstration at the train station.	
31 July 2025	Amersfoort	100	Noise demonstration at the train station.	
2 August 2025	Amsterdam	?	Disruption of the Booking.com boat during the Pride canal parade. Five protesters were arrested.	
2 August 2025	The Hague	15	Disruption of a train line by walking onto the tracks. Ended with police intervention. Thirteen protesters were arrested.	
2 August 2025	Groningen	50	Vigil behind Groningen City Hall.	
3 August 2025	Utrecht	50	Demonstration and march through the city center in protest of the killing of Palestinian journalists.	
6 August 2025	Sint-Oedenrode	100	Noise demonstration in the city center.	
7 August 2025	Almelo	?	Noise demonstration at the train station.	
7 August 2025	The Hague	?	Demonstration outside the House of Representatives building during a debate about Gaza.	
7 August 2025	Leeuwarden	?	Demonstration at the train station.	
7 August 2025	Zeist	30	Demonstration at the Den Dolder train station.	
7 August 2025	Oisterwijk	40	Demonstration and march through the city center.	
7 August 2025	Culemborg	50	Sit-in at the train station followed by march through the city center.	
7 August 2025	Nijmegen	400	Sit-in at the train station followed by march through the city center.	
9 August 2025	Amsterdam	500	Demonstration and march through the city center.	
10 August 2025	Hollands Kroon	25	Blocking of the Microsoft datacenter in Middenmeer.	
11 August 2025	Breda	?	Demonstration in front of the city hall.	
14 August 2025	Arnhem	?	Demonstration at the train station.	
14 August 2025	Ede	?	Demonstration at the train station.	
14 August 2025	Tiel	?	Demonstration at the train station.	
14 August 2025	Nijmegen	500	Noise demonstration at the train station.	
14 August 2025	Utrecht	500	Die-in, demonstration and march through the city center in protest of the killing of Palestinian journalists.	
16 August 2025	Amsterdam	1,500	Demonstration and march through the city center in protest of the killing of Palestinian journalists. Five mock cabins representing the assassination of journalist Anas al-Sharif and colleagues were placed in the main square. One protester was arrested after graffiting "Never again is now" on the National Monument.	
24 August 2025	Utrecht	?	Demonstration with thousands of shoes in the Vredenburgplein symbolizing Palestinian children killed by Israel. Participants including Douwe Bob read out the names of victims.	
28 August 2025	Deventer	100	Demonstration at the train station.	
30 August 2025	Utrecht	?	Demonstration at Ganzenmarkt with a recreation of the car where Hind Rajab was murdered by Israeli forces.	
31 August 2025	Utrecht	?	Demonstration at Vredenburgplein with a recreation of the car where Hind Rajab was murdered by Israeli forces.	
31 August 2025	The Hague	500	Rally organized by the group Free Palestine Bikers.	
1 September 2025	(Netherlands) Multiple	?	Interruption of work and noise demonstration at midday after the monthly sounding of the air raid siren.	
1 September 2025	Enschede	?	Disruption of the opening ceremony of the academic year at the University of Twente.	
1 September 2025	Wageningen	?	Disruption of the opening ceremony of the academic year at the Wageningen University & Research.	
1 September 2025	Eindhoven	?	Disruption of the opening ceremony of the academic year at the Eindhoven University of Technology. Protesters disrupted the speech by Defense Minister Ruben Brekelmans.	
1 September 2025	Amsterdam	5	Disruption of the opening ceremony of the academic year at the University of Amsterdam.	
1 September 2025	Utrecht	50	Die-in near the train station.	
1 September 2025	Utrecht	200	Walk-out by students and staff of the Utrecht University.	
4 September 2025	Oisterwijk	?	Demonstration and march through the city center.	
4 September 2025	Breda	50	Demonstration at the train station.	
9 September 2025	Papendrecht	11	Occupation of the roof of Fokker against the company's involvement in producing F-35 jet parts for the Israeli army. Ended with riot police intervention. All protesters were arrested.	
14 September 2025	Apeldoorn	?	Demonstration with thousands of shoes in the Vredenburgplein symbolizing Palestinian children killed by Israel. Participants read out the names of victims.	
14 September 2025	Groningen	2,000	Demonstration and march through the city center.	
18 September 2025	The Hague	?	Demonstration in front of the Ministry of Foreign Affairs. Protesters projected a countdown in the building facade representing the UN deadline for ending Israel's illegal occupation of Palestine.	
19 September 2025	The Hague	1	Defacing of the facade of the Israeli embassy. Ended with police intervention. The activist was arrested.	
20 September 2025	Rotterdam	50	Demonstration outside Neptunus Familiestadion against the participation of the Israeli team at the European Baseball Championship. Lasted until 22 September. Each day was met with police intervention.	
21 September 2025	Amsterdam	?	Defacing of the facade of an ING Bank office.	
25 September 2025	Rheden	50	Noise demonstration outside the Dieren train station. Protesters also held 2 minutes of silence for the victims in Gaza.	
25 September 2025	Ede	50	Demonstration and march through the city center, followed by the delivery of 1300-signature petition to mayor René Verhulst.	
27 September 2025	Leiden	500	Demonstration and march through the city center.	
28 September 2025	Zaanstad	20	Demonstration outside the Justitieel Complex Zaanstad against the arrest of Palestinian journalist Mustafa Ayyash.	
30 September 2025	Zaanstad	?	Demonstration outside the Justitieel Complex Zaanstad against the arrest of Palestinian journalist Mustafa Ayyash.	
30 September 2025	Utrecht	50	Occupation of the Drift 25 building of the Utrecht University. Lasted until 2 October. Ended by protesters disbanding on their own.	
2 October 2025	Utrecht	?	Defacing of the facade of the Utrecht City Hall with red paint.	
2 October 2025	The Hague	600	Occupation of the entrance to the Ministry of Foreign Affairs, and large demonstration around it, in response to Israel's interception and kidnapping of activists on board of the Global Sumud Flotilla. Protesters then moved to occupying the tram tracks between the Ministry building and the train station, leading to disruptions in the bus and tram service for several hours. Subsequently, protesters moved to the Hague Central Station where other activists were blocking some of the train tracks, leading to shut down of the train traffic for several hours. Ended with riot police intervention. At least 205 protesters were arrested.	
3 October 2025	Deventer	?	Demonstration at the Wilhelmina Bridge. Activists unfurled a large banner reading "wat deed jij toen een volk werd uitgerdeid" ("what did you do when a people was exterminated").	
4 October 2025	's-Hertogenbosch	10	Blocking of a building of ING bank and demonstration outside. Ended with police intervention. Some activists were arrested.	
5 October 2025	Amsterdam	250,000	Third red line demonstration. Largest demonstration in the country in over 20 years. Five activists were arrested.	
6 October 2025	Amsterdam	300	Walkout by students of the University of Amsterdam.	
7 October 2025	Amsterdam	?	Defacing of the facade of the Royal Palace of Amsterdam with red paint in response to the mayor's ban of pro-Palestinian commemorations that day.	
7 October 2025	Nijmegen	?	Occupation of the Goudsmit Pavilion of the Radboud University. Lasted until the early hours of 8 October. Ended with police intervention. 23 activists have been arrested.	
7 October 2025	(Netherlands) Multiple	?	Sit-ins at 20 train stations across the country.	
7 October 2025	Tilburg	25	Vigil on the campus of the Tilburg University.	
7 October 2025	Utrecht	500	Demonstration in the train station and march through the city center.	
7 October 2025	Arnhem	500-2000	Demonstration outside Eusebius Church and march towards the John Frost Bridge.	
7 October 2025	The Hague	500	Demonstration at Hofvijver and march towards Laan van Reagan en Gorbachev.	
8 October 2025	Amsterdam	20	Occupation of the train tracks at the Amsterdam Central Station. Ended with police intervention. 20 activists were arrested.	
9 October 2025	Nijmegen	?	Demonstration outside the police station where some activists arrested after the Radboud University occupation on 7 October were being held.	
9 October 2025	Arnhem	?	Demonstration outside the police station where some activists arrested after the Radboud University occupation on 7 October were being held.	
9 October 2025	Nijmegen	?	Noise demonstration at the train station. Tofik Dibi, leader of political party BIJ1, gave a speech during the protest.	
9 October 2025	Almelo	100	Noise demonstration outside the train station.	
10 October 2025	Rotterdam	50	Blocking of access roads to the Port of Rotterdam. Some protesters have been threatened by truck drivers. Ended by protesters disbanding on their own.	
11 October 2025	Haarlem	?	Demonstration at the Krocht with a recreation of the car where Hind Rajab was murdered by Israeli forces.	
11 October 2025	Maastricht	?	Demonstration with thousands of shoes in the Vrijthof square symbolizing Palestinian children killed by Israel. Participants read out the names of victims.	
11 October 2025	Rotterdam	300-800	Blocking of train tracks at the Port of Rotterdam together with Geef Tegengas activists. The action was complemented by a strike by port workers responsible for securing and unlashing containers. Ended with police intervention. 200 protesters have been arrested.	
12 October 2025	Haarlem	?	Demonstration at the Grote Markt with a recreation of the car where Hind Rajab was murdered by Israeli forces.	
13 October 2025	Leiden	15	Disruption protest during a meeting of the university council.	
15 October 2025	Maastricht	25	Protest at the University of Maastricht.	
16 October 2025	Groningen	25	Demonstration in front of the Academiegebouw of the university.	
18 October 2025	Papendrecht	100	Fourth protest in front of Fokker headquarters in Papendrecht.	
19 October 2025	Amsterdam	?	Gluing of door locks of around 40 Albert Heijn stores in protest of their sale of Israeli products. Some stores were closed for several hours.	
21 October 2025	Rotterdam	?	Demonstration at Erasmus University against an Erasmus School of Law professor that posted anti-Palestinian messages on social media platform X.	
21 October 2025	Amsterdam	25	Demonstration outside Rechtbank Amsterdam showing support for the release of Palestinian journalist Mustafa Ayyash.	
23 October 2025	Leiden	?	Sit-in at the train station.	
28 October 2025	Rotterdam	50	Demonstration at Erasmus University against an Erasmus School of Law professor that posted anti-Palestinian messages on social media platform X. A pro-Israel counter-demonstration organized by Center for Information and Documentation Israel was also present on campus.	
29 October 2025	Utrecht	?	Defacing of the facade of several Albert Heijn stores with messages such as "AH complicit in genocide" and gluing of some door locks in protest of their sale of Israeli products. Some stores were closed for several hours.	
30 October 2025	Nijmegen	?	Noise demonstration at the train station.	
2 November 2025	Utrecht	?	Vigil in the city center in memory of the Palestinian journalists killed by the Israeli army.	
3 November 2025	Rotterdam	?	Defacing of windows of an Allianz office in protest of its ties with Israeli arms producer Elbit Systems. Activists smashed the windows and sprayed red paint.	
6 November 2025	Papendrecht	29	Occupation of the Fokker's main headquarters. Ended with police intervention. 29 protesters were arrested.	
6 November 2025	Amsterdam	?	Sit-in at the train station for Palestine and Sudan.	
6 November 2025	Utrecht	?	Demonstration at the train station and march towards Stadsschouwburg for an event of solidarity for Palestine.	
8 November 2025	Bergen op Zoom	?	Demonstration with thousands of shoes in the Grote Markt symbolizing Palestinian children killed by Israel.	
11 November 2025	Rotterdam	30	Demonstration outside Luxor Theater against a lecture by former US Secretary of State Antony Blinken.	
13 November 2025	Nijmegen	50	Demonstration outside the administration building of the Radboud University in solidarity with lecturer Harry Pettit. The protesters claim he was forced to leave the university due to pressure from the executive board due to his statements online in support of Palestinian rights.	
18 November 2025	Nijmegen	3	Disruption of a speech by the president of the Executive Board of the Radboud University Alexandra van Huffelen. Protesters shouted slogans such as "cut the ties" and "shame" and tossed of seriously injured Palestinians.	
20 November 2025	Rotterdam	?	Demonstration outside of the annual arms fair at the Rotterdam Ahoy. Some protesters climbed to a scaffolding with advertising signs and unfurled large banners with messages such as "stop wapenhandel" ("stop arms trade") and "stop profiting from genocide". Ended with police intervention. Nine protesters were arrested.	
21 November 2025	Utrecht	20	Demonstration outside the Koningsberger building of the Utrecht University during its open day to protest against the ties with Israeli institutions and companies.	
26 November 2025	Leiden	50	Occupation of the Academy Building of the Leiden University, which the activists renamed after Dr. Suleiman Haboush, a Palestinian historian killed in Gaza in October 2023. Ended with police intervention. Some protesters were arrested.	
27 November 2025	Utrecht	60	Sit-in at the train station. Protesters also showed solidarity with Sudan.	
2 December 2025	Utrecht	20	Occupation of the Drift 25 building of the Utrecht University, which the activists renamed after Dr. Hussam Abu Safiya, a Palestinian doctor and director of the Kamal Adwan Hospital in Gaza that was kidnaped by the Israeli army. Lasted until 14 December. Ended by protesters disbanding on their own.	
3 December 2025	Eindhoven	15	Demonstration at Eindhoven University of Technology. Some protesters forced an entrance to the Executive Board's office. Ended with police intervention. One protester was arrested.	
3 December 2025	Delft	115	Occupation of the roof of the Engineering and Naval Architecture (ME) building of TU Delft by about five activists, and supporting demonstration on campus. The protesters renamed the building as Abu Assi Building after two brothers, aged 8 and 11, who were killed by an Israeli drone strike. Protesters claimed the university made "false promises" regarding cutting off partnerships with Israel. Ended with riot police intervention. Six protesters were arrested.	
4 December 2025	(Netherlands) Multiple	?	Sit-in at over 40 train stations across the country.	
13 December 2025	Utrecht	?	Defacing of several buildings of the Utrecht University with red paint and smashing of some windows. The buildings affected include the Academy Building and Trans 10 in the city center, and the Administration Building at Utrecht Science Park.	
14 December 2025	Amsterdam	?	Blocking of the entrance to Concertgebouw and demonstration at Museumplein in protest of the concert by former lieutenant colonel of the Israeli army Shai Abramson. Ended with police intervention. Several protesters were arrested.	
15 December 2025	Amsterdam	?	Defacing of the facade of the Concertgebouw with red paint in protest of the concert by former lieutenant colonel of the Israeli army Shai Abramson.	
17 December 2025	Amsterdam	?	Counter-protest against a pro-Israel demonstration at the Dam square. Smoke bombs were set off and red paint was thrown when a large Israel flag was unfurled. Ended with police intervention. Four protesters were arrested.	
23 December 2025	Papendrecht	?	Defacing of the front of Fokker headquarters with red paint and smashing of some windows.	

=== 2026 ===
Date	Municipality	Estimated attendance	Description	Ref(s)
8 January 2026	Tilburg	?	Demonstration at the Tilburg train station.	
14 January 2026	Utrecht	?	Defacing of the facade of ING bank branch on Lange Viestraat. Activists broke several windows and smeared the front with red paint.	
16 January 2026	Amersfoort	?	Silent protest at the Hof.	
16 January 2026	The Hague	20	Demonstration outside the Ministry of Foreign Affairs in support of Palestine and Iran. Some protesters were later doxxed online by pro-monarchist Iranians.	
26 January 2026	Amsterdam	?	Defacing of the facade of ING bank branch on Vijzelgracht. Activists broke several windows and smeared the front with red paint.	
14 February 2026	Arnhem	200	March through the city center.	
17 February 2026	Utrecht	?	Protest in front of the Administration Building at Utrecht Science Park.	
25 February 2026	Tilburg	?	Disruption of a concert by the Jerusalem Quartet at the Concert Hall by two protesters with signs reading "shame" and "no genocide in classical music". Other protesters carried out a noise demonstration outside.	
3 March 2026	Eindhoven	16	Occupation of the roof of a building of the Eindhoven University of Technology. Ended with police intervention.	
5 March 2026	Eindhoven	?	Defacing of 23 windows and 7 doors at TU Eindhoven by activists from Palestine Action NL demanding the university to end ties with Israeli companies.	
7 March 2026	Nijmegen	?	Blocking of a building of ING bank and demonstration outside.	
8 March 2026	Haarlem	20	Protest at the Grote Markt.	
10 March 2026	Delft	?	Defacing of the entrance of the Aula building of TU Delft. Some windows were broken, entrance doors were smeared with butyric acid, and the message "Fok Fokker" was written on windows.	
11 March 2026	Amsterdam	?	Defacing of the facade of ING bank branch on Kamerlingh Onneslaan. Activists broke a window and smeared walls with red paint.	
11 March 2026	Delft	?	Defacing of windows of the Echo building of TU Delft ahead of a lecture by Zionist Gil Troy scheduled for that night. Twenty-five windows were smashed, other smeared with butyric acid, and others defaced with messages such as "stop your Zionist war propaganda" and "stop Zios".	
20 March 2026	Utrecht	300	Demonstration in front of the Protestant Church in the Netherlands (PKN) building in Utrecht criticizing the "church leadership turning a blind eye to the ongoing genocide and ethnic cleansing by Israel".	
22 March 2026	Amsterdam	50	Demonstration outside the US consulate at Museumplein. Protesters showed solidarity for victims in Palestine, Iran, Lebanon, and others. A counter-protest of about ten people was also present at a distance, waving American, Israeli, Kurdish, and Iranian monarchist flags.	
23 March 2026	Rotterdam	500	March to the Maersk offices at Willemswerf.	
26 March 2026	Utrecht	40	Demonstration outside the Domkerk during celebrations of the 390th Dies Natalis of the Utrecht University in protest of the continued collaboration with Israeli universities.	
27 March 2026	Delft	100	Demonstration at the campus of TU Delft in protest of the university ongoing collaboration with Israeli institutions.	
28 March 2026	The Hague	100	Demonstration in the city center in solidarity with Palestine and Iran.	
31 March 2026	Amsterdam	100	Demonstration against the Israeli parliament passing a law imposing the death penalty for Palestinians. Ended with police intervention.	
2 April 2026	Amsterdam	?	Demonstration at the Dam Square. Amsterdam mayor Femke Halsema and the Israeli lobby group CIDI accused the speech of one protester as being antisemitic.	
2 April 2026	Maastricht	?	Walk-out by students and staff of Maastricht University.	
2 April 2026	Maastricht	50	Occupation of a building of Maastricht University and demonstration outside. Ended with riot police intervention.	
3 April 2026	Delft	1	Demonstration outside the Nieuwe Kerk during the visit of former Prime Ministers Jan-Peter Balkenende, Mark Rutte, Dick Schoof, and current Prime Minister Rob Jetten.	
4 April 2026	Amsterdam	?	Demonstration at the Dam Square. One protester was arrested.	
5 April 2026	Rotterdam	500	Demonstration and march through the city center.	
7 April 2026	The Hague	?	Demonstration outside the House of Representatives.	
8 April 2026	Utrecht	50	Demonstration at the train station in solidarity with Palestine and Lebanon, proceeded by blocking of car traffic at the intersection of Vredenburg and Lange Viestraat, and later the intersection of Nachtegaalstraat and Maliesingel.	
9 April 2026	The Hague	?	Demonstration outside the House of Representatives in solidarity with Palestine, Lebanon, and Iran.	
10 April 2026	Overbetuwe	100	Blocking of train tracks of the Betuweroute, a freight railway between Rotterdam and Germany, by Geef Tegengas activists. This line is frequently used to transport weapons and military equipment. Ended with police intervention. About 50 protesters were arrested.	
12 April 2026	Amsterdam	?	Demonstration with thousands of shoes at the Dam Square symbolizing Palestinian children killed by Israel. Volunteers and Dutch personalities read out-loud the names of deceased children.	
16 April 2026	The Hague	10	Disruption of a debate at the House of Representatives about the Middle East. Ended with police intervention.	
16 April 2026	Utrecht	100	Demonstration at Utrecht Centraal and march towards the Domplein in solidarity with Palestine and Lebanon.	
18 April 2026	Amsterdam	?	Demonstration and march through the city center in solidarity with Palestinian prisoners held by Israel.	
25 April 2026	Utrecht	400	Blockade of the A12 highway by activists from Extinction Rebellion and pro-Palestine groups. Lasted over 4 hours. Ended with police intervention. About 400 protesters were arrested.	
30 April 2026	Utrecht	20	Blocking of the entrance and occupation of the roof of the Administration Building at Utrecht Science Park. The action lasted 9 hours.	
30 April 2026	Utrecht	40	March through the city center and blocking of car traffic at the intersection of Maliesingel and Nachtegaalstraat.	
30 April 2026	Renswoude	?	Demonstration outside the Protestant church De Voorhof where an event organized by Christians for Israel was taking place. Clashes occurred between pro-Palestine and pro-Israel protesters, including a pro-Israel stealing a Palestinian flag from a protester. Ended with police intervention.	
30 April 2026	Tilburg	10	Occupation of the Dante building. Ended by protesters disbanding on their own.	
4 May 2026	Amsterdam	3	Spraying of the National Monument with red paint. Activists also graffitied the word "genocide" on it.	
5 May 2026	Arnhem	?	Demonstration at the Nelson Mandela bridge. Activists unfurled a large banner reading "wat deed jij toen een volk werd uitgerdeid" ("what did you do when a people was exterminated").	
5 May 2026	Utrecht	?	Protest outside the Domkerk where Prime Minister Rob Jetten was attending a commemoration of the Liberation Day.	
5 May 2026	Wageningen	?	Demonstration at the Plantsoen.	
6 May 2026	Amsterdam	200	Walk-out by students and staff of the University of Amsterdam against the increasing militarization of the university.	
7 May 2026	Amsterdam	50	Counter-demonstration in protest of a conference with speakers who deny the famine and genocide in Gaza. During the conference, which did not follow the rules set by the university regarding Israel-Palestine events, there were clashes among some attendants.	
7 May 2026	Nijmegen	75	Protest at Radboud University a year after a demonstration where a protester was bitten by a riot police dog.	
9 May 2026	Leiden	?	Demonstration and march through the city center.	
9 May 2026	Rotterdam	25	Blocking of train tracks at the Port of Rotterdam by Geef Tegengas activists. Ended with police intervention.	
10 May 2026	Rotterdam	20	Blocking of train tracks at the Port of Rotterdam by Geef Tegengas activists. Ended with police intervention.	
11 May 2026	Rotterdam	20	Blocking of train tracks at the Port of Rotterdam by Geef Tegengas activists. Ended with police intervention.	
12 May 2026	Rotterdam	30	Blocking of train tracks near Pernis by Geef Tegengas activists. Ended with police intervention. Six protesters were arrested.	
13 May 2026	Rotterdam	20	Blocking of train tracks near Pernis by Geef Tegengas activists. Ended with police intervention. Two protesters were arrested.	
14 May 2026	Rotterdam	40	Blocking of train tracks near the Vaanplein junction by Geef Tegengas and Kappen met Kolen activists. Ended with police intervention. Seven protesters were arrested.	
15 May 2026	Rotterdam	?	Blocking of train tracks at the Port of Rotterdam by Geef Tegengas activists. Ended with police intervention.	
15 May 2026	Utrecht	?	Demonstration at the Domplein on occasion of the Nakba commemorations.	
15 May 2026	Rotterdam	300	Silent march through the city center for the annual Nakba commemoration.	
16 May 2026	Rotterdam	?	Blocking of train tracks at the Port of Rotterdam by Geef Tegengas activists. Ended with police intervention.	
17 May 2026	Rotterdam	30	Blocking of train tracks near the Vaanplein junction by Kappen met Kolen activists. Ended with police intervention. Fifteen protesters were arrested.	
18 May 2026	Amsterdam	?	Occupation of the BelleVUe building and administrative corridor of the Vrije Universiteit. Ended with police intervention. Several protesters were arrested.	
18 May 2026	Eindhoven	10	Occupation of the roof of a building at Eindhoven University of Technology demanding the university spin-off SmartPhotonics to stop collaborating with an Israeli technology and cyber-security company. Ended with police intervention. One protester was arrested.	
18 May 2026	Rotterdam	25	Blocking of train tracks at the Port of Rotterdam by Geef Tegengas activists. Ended with police intervention. Several protesters were arrested.	
19 May 2026	The Hague	50	Protest outside the House of Representatives in response to the kidnapping of Global Sumud Flotilla activists near Cyprus. Ended with police intervention. Dozens of protesters were arrested. This was followed by another group blocking the train lines. Ended also with police intervention. Several protesters were arrested.	
21 May 2026	Utrecht	5,000	Demonstration in solidarity with Palestinians as part of a larger march through the city center in reaction to the attacks against asylum-seeking center in Loosdrecht.	
22 May 2026	Amsterdam	?	Defacing of the facade of ING bank branch on Bijlmerdreef in Amsterdam-Zuidoost. Activists broke several windows and smeared the front with red paint.	
22 May 2026	Barendrecht	20	Blocking of the railway tracks of the Havenspoorlijn by Geef Tegengas activists. Ended with police intervention.	
23 May 2026	Utrecht	150	Demonstration in the train station demanding "a full economic embargo" and sanctions against Israel. A group of about 30 activists from XR Justice Now also occupied the tracks and blocked the train traffic. Ended with police intervention. Several protesters were arrested.	
28 May 2026	Utrecht	?	Defacing of the facade of ING bank branch on Lange Viestraat. Activists broke several windows and smeared the front with red paint.	
4 June 2026	Nijmegen	?	Blocking of the entrance to the logistics center of Radboud University. Ended by protesters disbanding on their own.	
12 June 2026	Amsterdam	50	Blocking of the entrance to a construction site of a large data center in Sloterdijk. Activists held banners with messages such as "Microsoft powers genocide".	
17 June 2026	Utrecht	5	Defacing of the facade of the Administration Building at Utrecht Science Park. Several windows were smashed and sprayed with red paint.	
19 June 2026	Neder-Betuwe	20	Blocking of the railway tracks of the Betuweroute by Geef Tegengas and Kappen met Kolen activists. Ended with police intervention. All protesters were arrested.	
26 July 2026	Utrecht	50	Protest outside the Neude library against the participation of 93 representatives from Israeli universities at the European University Debate Championship. One of the judges of the competition was Israeli reservist and tank gunner Leon Khlebnikov, against whom the Hind Rajab Foundation filed an urgent criminal complaint with the Dutch National Public Prosecutor's Office for war crimes in Gaza such as the destruction of a school which he shared on social media.	
14 August 2026	Utrecht	5-15	Demonstration outside the Neude library.	
31 August 2026	The Hague	?	Protest during the opening of the academic year at the University of Leiden in the Hague.	
5 September 2026	Almere	?	Demonstration where protestors flew their kites in solidarity with Palestinian children that were forbidden by Israel to do the same.	
5 September 2026	Groningen	?	Demonstration where protestors flew their kites in solidarity with Palestinian children that were forbidden by Israel to do the same.	
8 September 2026	The Hague	?	Disruption of a public meeting at the House of Representatives by protesters shouting "how many more Palestinians have to be killed" and other messages during questioning of PVV leader Geert Wilders. The entrance to the building was also blocked and defaced with graffiti of messages such as "Free Gaza" and "boycott Israel". Ended with police intervention. Two protesters were arrested.	
17 September 2026	Amsterdam	50	Counter-protest against a celebration by the group Christians for Israel at the Dam Square. One group lowered a large Palestinian flag from a balcony in the square. Ended with police intervention. Over 40 pro-Palestine protesters were arrested.	
26 September 2026	Leiden	500	Demonstration and march through the city center.	
27 September 2026	Amsterdam	5	Disruption of a speech of Prime Minister Rob Jetten during the 60th anniversary congress of D66. The protesters wore t-shirts with messages such as "less selfies, more sanctions", and "blood coalition".	
3 October 2026	Overbetuwe	20	Blocking of the railway tracks of the Betuweroute by Geef Tegengas and Kappen met Kolen activists. Ended with police intervention. All protesters were arrested.	
5 October 2026	Delft	50	Encampment in front of Aula at TU Delft. Protesters built a "Palestinian house" symbolizing the 108 Palestinian houses that Israel demolishes per day. Lasted until 19 October. Ended by protesters disbanding on their own.	
7 October 2026	Leiden	?	Demonstration in the city center.	
7 October 2026	Nijmegen	?	Protest on the campus of Radboud University demanding an end to all ties with Israeli authorities.	
7 October 2026	Arnhem	50	Demonstration in the city center.	
7 October 2026	Rotterdam	50	Demonstration at Rotterdam Central Station.	
7 October 2026	Utrecht	100	Sit-in at Utrecht Central Station and march through the city center.	
7 October 2026	Amsterdam	150	Demonstration and march through the city center.	
7 October 2026	Amsterdam	?	Defacing of windows of the city hall with red paint by Palestine Action NL which stated that the police deployed by the mayor "beats up protesters (including children) who demonstrate against genocide".	
11 October 2026	Amsterdam	1,000	Demonstration at the Dam Square. A protester was arrested for holding an edited poster of René Magritte's Le vrai visage de Rex, where Léon Degrelle holds a mirror and sees Hitler as his reflection, with Degrelle being substituted by Minister of Defence Dilan Yeşilgöz and Lidewij de Vos.	
15 October 2026	Alkmaar	40	March from the station to the stadium where Israeli football team Hapoel Be'er Sheva F.C. was playing.	
18 October 2026	Utrecht	500	Demonstration and march through the city center in memory of the over 20,000 Palestinian children killed by Israel since October 2023. Protesters carried a 36 meters long cloth with thousands of children's names.	
22 October 2026	Papendrecht	40	Occupation of the Fokker's main headquarters by activists from Fok Fokker and Geef Tegengas. Ended with police intervention. 40 protesters were arrested.	
8 November 2026	Amsterdam	200,000	Fourth red line demonstration. Protesters marched through the city wearing red clothes and demanding the Dutch government to take more measures against Israel's actions in Gaza, including implementing trade sanctions, recognize the genocide in Gaza, and halting arms sales to Israel. Four protesters were arrested.	
19 November 2026	Tilburg	15	Occupation of an auditorium at Tilburg University during the Dies Natalis celebration. Protesters demanded the cutting of ties with the Hebrew University. Ended with police intervention.	

== See also ==
- Gaza war protests
- 2024 pro-Palestinian protests on university campuses in the Netherlands
- 2025 pro-Palestinian protests on university campuses in the Netherlands
- 2025 pro-Palestinian protests on university campuses
- Boycott, Divestment, and Sanctions
- Lists of pro-Palestinian protests
