= Sadet Karabulut =

Dutch politician

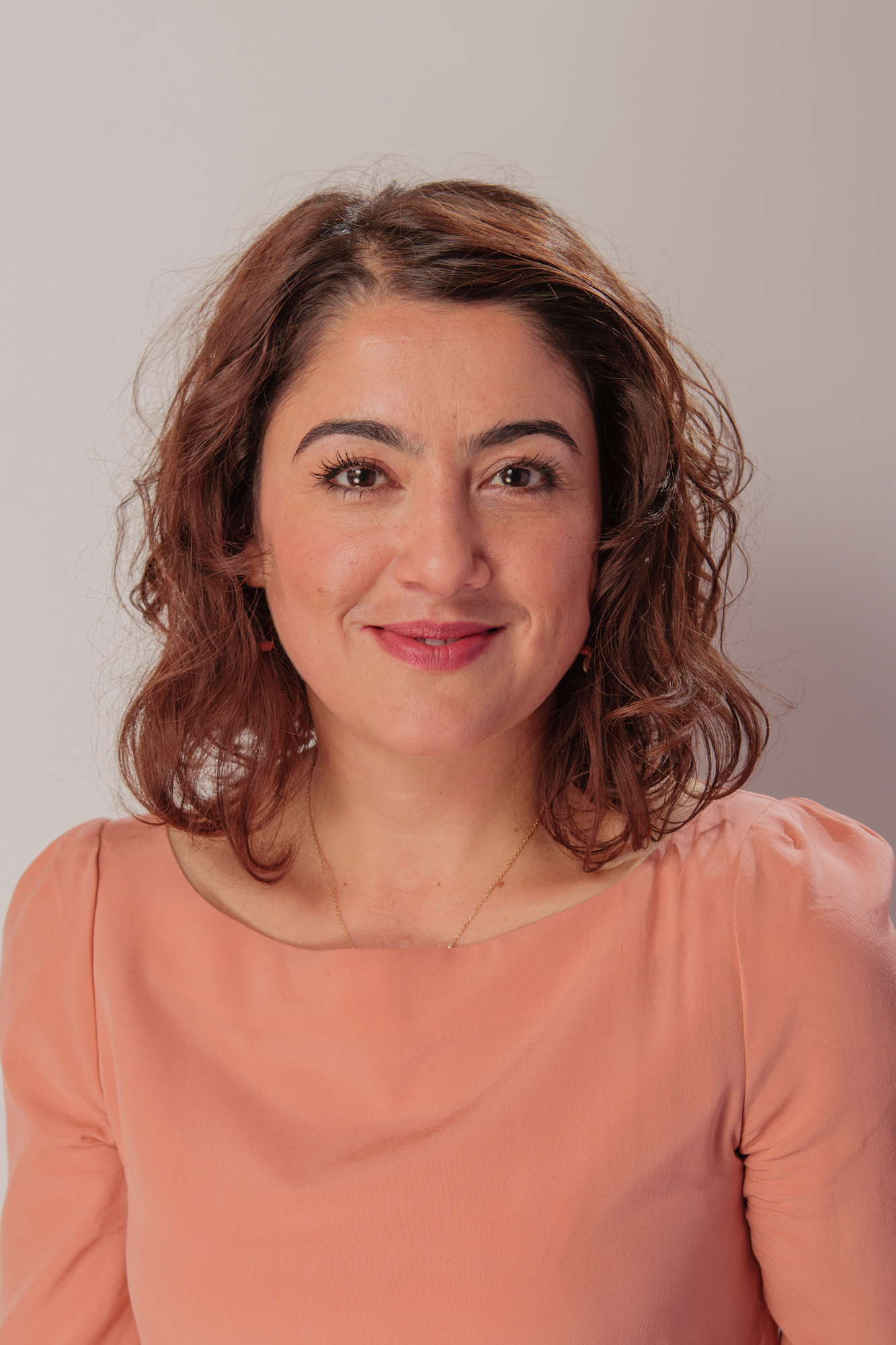
- Sadet Karabulut in 2012

Member of the House of Representatives
- Incumbent
- Assumed office 26 November 2013
- In office 14 April 2011 – 5 August 2013
- In office 30 November 2006 – 11 January 2011

Member of the municipal council of Amsterdam
- In office 16 March 2006 – 29 November 2006

Personal details
- Born: 28 April 1975 (age 51) Dordrecht, Netherlands
- Party: Socialist Party
- Sadet Karabulut's voice Recorded May 2017

Sadet Karabulut (born 28 April 1975) is a Dutch politician and former civil servant and trade unionist of Kurdish descent. As a member of the Socialist Party (Socialistische Partij), she has been an MP since 30 November 2006. She focuses on matters of social affairs (poverty reduction, social assistance, purchasing power, child benefits), female emancipation, and social integration.

== Biography ==
Karabulut was born as the daughter of a Turkish-Kurdish guest worker. Her parents were of Alevi origin, but at home religion did not play an important role, and in her teens Karabulut decided that she did not believe in God.

Karabulut studied public administration at Erasmus University Rotterdam and political science at the University of Bordeaux. She was active in the Dutch National Students' Trade Union (LSVb), and board member at the Orion Foundation (Public Kingma School for special education). Since 2005, she has been a member of the Socialist Party. From March till November 2006, she was a member of the municipal council of Amsterdam.

In response to the 2008–09 Gaza War, SP Members of Parliament Harry van Bommel and Karabulut together with Gretta Duisenberg marched in a 3 January 2009 demonstrationagainst the Israeli occupation of Palestine, calling for an intifada against Israel. Both chanted the slogan "Intifada, intifada, free Palestine". This led to criticism from the VVD, PVV and the Centre Information and Documentation Israel (CIDI, a Zionist organisation). SP parliamentary leader Agnes Kant also reprimanded Van Bommel and Karabulut. On 5 January 2009, Van Bommel stated that their call for an intifada had been misunderstood; he and Karabulut had meant a "non-violent intifada".

In February 2013, Karabulut stated she would refuse to pledge loyalty to the soon-to-be-King, Dutch Crown Prince Willem Alexander, during his inauguration ceremony. She cited that the procedure was overly ceremonial as she had already pledged allegiance when she was admitted to the House of Representatives. She is also a convinced republican.

From August to November 2013, Karabulut temporarily left the House of Representatives on a maternity leave and was replaced by Tjitske Siderius. She returned later that year. During the 2017 Dutch general election Karabulut was on the SP's candidate list's fifth place. When parliamentary leader Emile Roemer stepped down in 2017, she announced her candidacy to lead the party in his stead. However, the majority of the parliamentary group chose Lilian Marijnissen, former leader Jan Marijnissen's daughter.

Karabulut is a leading member of the Dutch branch of the Democratic Workers' Clubs Federation (Demokratik Isci Dernekleri Federasyonu, DIDF).

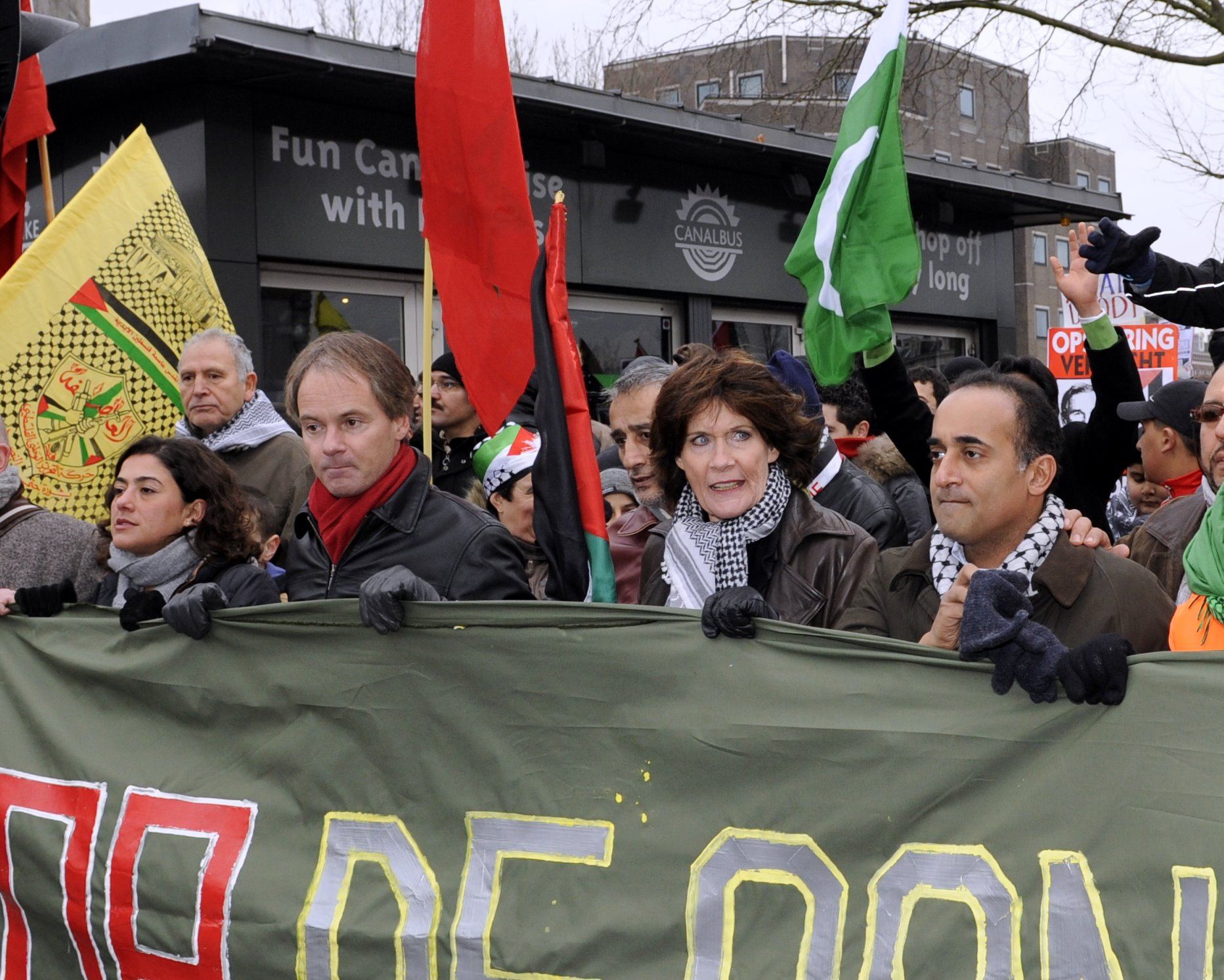
Museumplein protest on 3 January 2009. Left to right: Karabulut, Harry van Bommel, Gretta Duisenberg and Tariq Shadid.
