= Palestinian Youth Movement =

International Palestinian organization

- حركة الشباب الفلسطيني
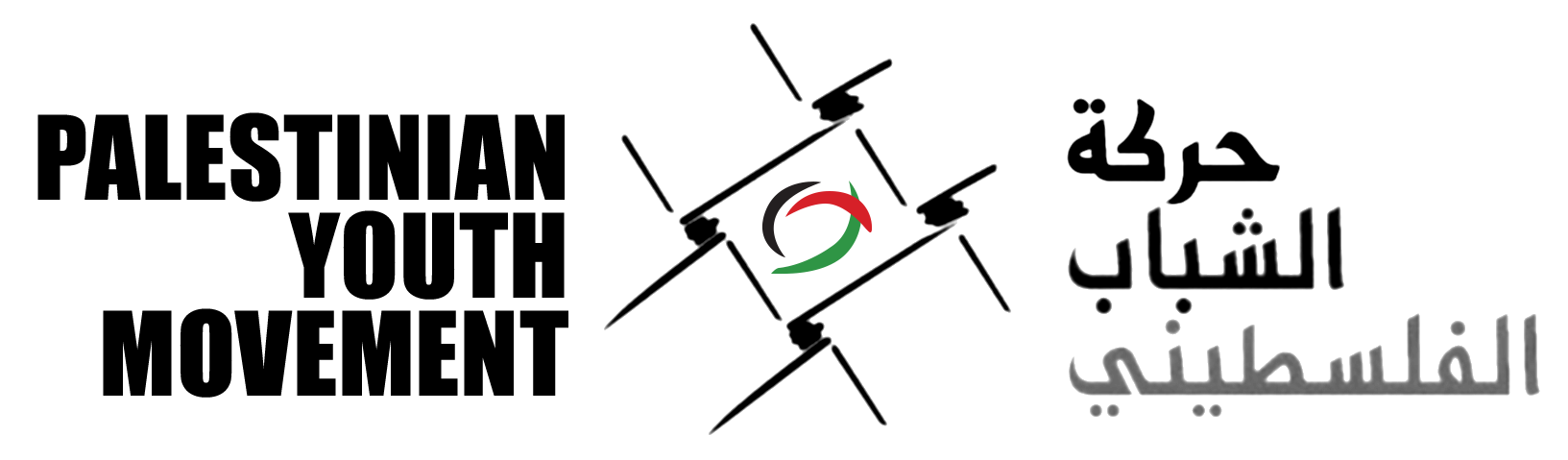

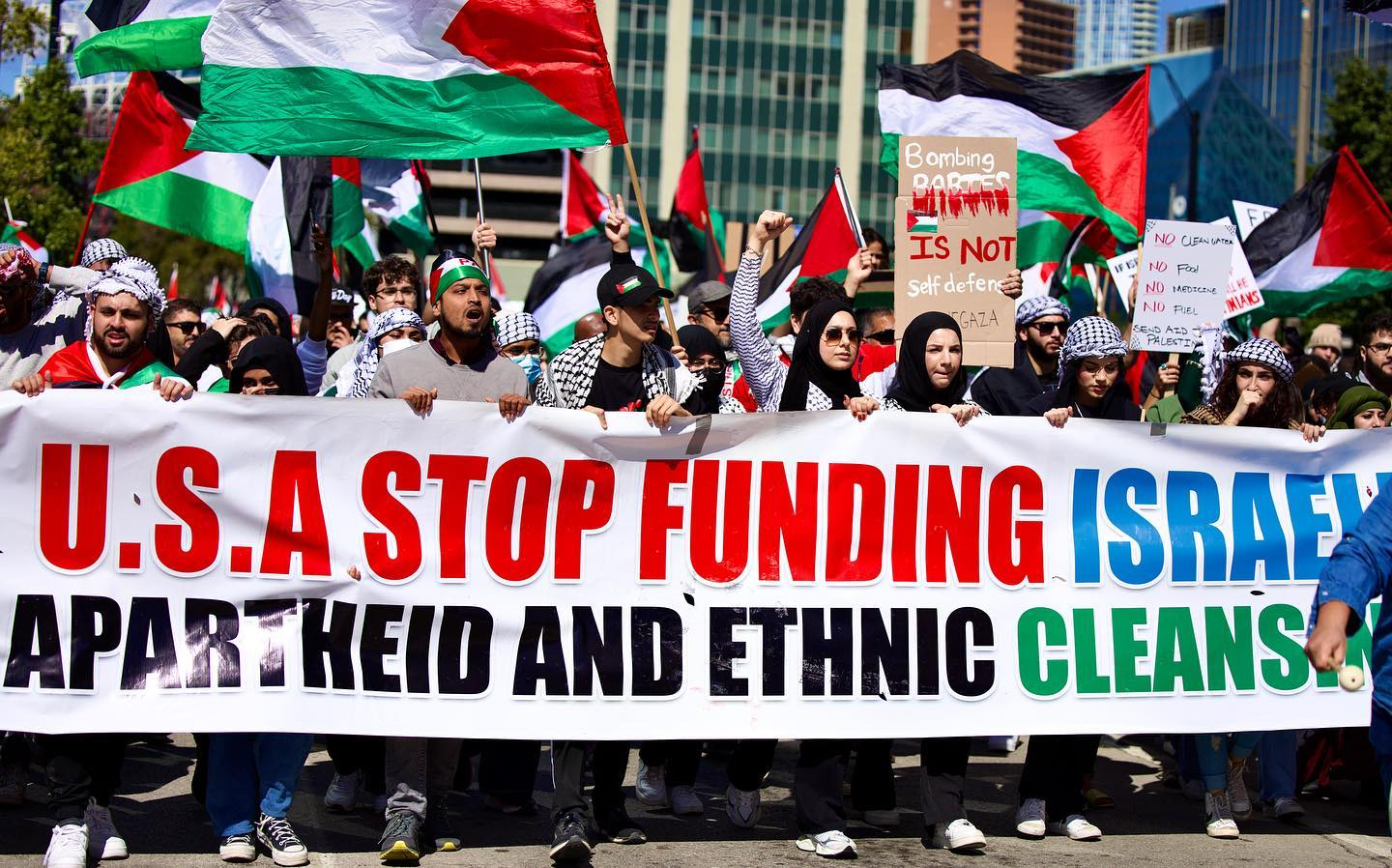
- Protest organized by PYM in Dallas on October 15, 2023
- Formation: Possibly 1982 (44 years ago)
- Headquarters: White Plains, New York, U.S.
- Region served: North America; Europe
- Affiliations: Progressive International
- Website: palestinianyouthmovement.com

The Palestinian Youth Movement (PYM; Arabic: حركة الشباب الفلسطيني, romanized: Ḥarakat al-Shabāb al-Filasṭīnī) is a pro-Palestinian, anti-Zionist, socialist, and anti-imperialist organization with chapters across North America and Europe. The group has participated in political actions and protests alongside organizations such as the Party for Socialism and Liberation (PSL), a communist party in the United States, and the ANSWER Coalition. It is mainly composed of Palestinian and Arab youth.

PYM has participated in the ongoing Gaza war protests in the United States, including the 2024 Columbia University occupations and the July 2024 protest in Washington D.C. alongside various other groups, and has taken an approach compared to that of New York City anti-Zionist group Within Our Lifetime (WOL), in refusing to work within the Democratic Party.

In 2024, PYM along with translator Muhammad Tutunji created the first English translation of Wisam Rafeedie's The Trinity of Fundamentals, a novel about a member of the Palestinian resistance. Rafeedie is a former Palestinian prisoner who was held in Israel.

In June 2025, following an international campaign led by PYM, the multinational shipping company Maersk announced that it would cut ties with companies linked to illegal Israeli settlements in the occupied West Bank.

== See also ==
- Palestinian diaspora
- Mask Off Maersk
