= Gretta Duisenberg =

Dutch pro-Palestinian political activist

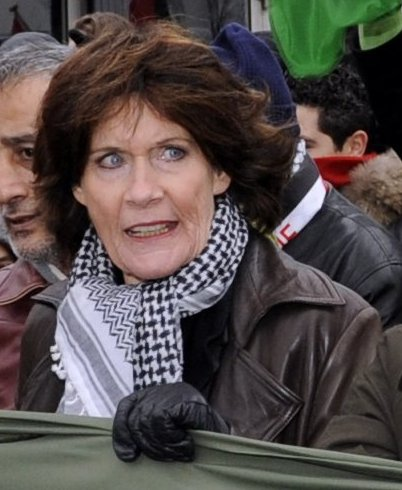
- Duisenberg in January 2009
- Born: Greetje Nieuwenhuizen; 6 November 1942 (age 83); Heerenveen, Netherlands
- Occupations: Political activist; nurse
- Years active: c. 1975–present
- Spouses: Frits Bédier de Prairie (m. 1967; div. 1975) Wim Duisenberg (m. 1987; died 2005)
- Children: 3

Gretta Duisenberg-Nieuwenhuizen (born 6 November 1942) is a Dutch pro-Palestinian political activist. She is the widow of Dutch Labour Party (PvdA) politician Wim Duisenberg, who was also the first president of the European Central Bank.

== Biography ==
Gretta Duisenberg was born as Greetje Nieuwenhuizen into a strict Reformed family in Heerenveen, Friesland, where her father worked as a policeman. The family moved to Haarlem, where she grew up as a member of the Free Reformed Churches. She broke away from her religious background in the 1960s and began using the name Gretta. She started a career as a nurse and was married to internist Frits Bédier de Prairie from 1967 to 1975. They have three children.

After their divorce, she continued to bear the name of her ex-husband and went through life as Gretta Bédier de Prairie. During this period, she became active in left-wing politics and human rights causes. In the late 1970s she became involved with the Transnational Institute, an organization that advocates for the interests of the Global South and is critical of globalization. During these years she was a member of the Pacifist Socialist Party. Later she became a member of the Socialist Party.

In the early 1980s she had a brief relationship with the then Dutch Minister of Defence Hans van Mierlo. Through him she met Wim Duisenberg, who coincidentally was also born in Heerenveen. In 1987 she married Duisenberg, who was then president of De Nederlandsche Bank and from 1998 inaugural president of the European Central Bank (ECB). He died in 2005 at his holiday home in France.

== Pro-Palestinian activism ==
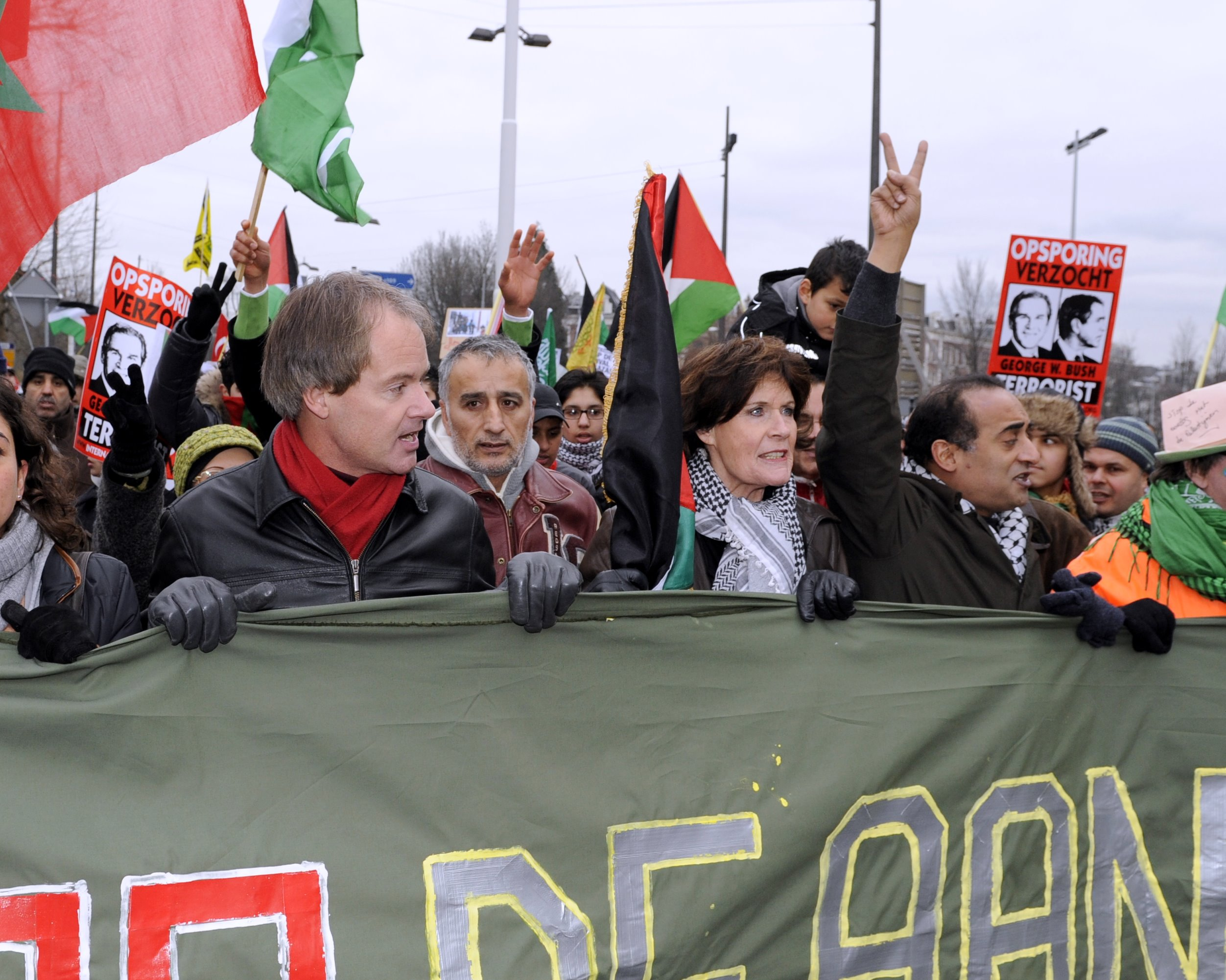
Harry van Bommel, Duisenberg, and Tariq Shadid at the 2009 protest against the Gaza War on the Museumplein in Amsterdam

Gretta Duisenberg came to international attention in 2002 when the media reported that the president of the ECB had a Palestinian flag hanging from his house in Amsterdam.

Gretta Duisenberg came under fire when she announced her intention of collecting six million signatures as part of her campaign to draw attention to the Israeli occupation of the Palestinian Territories. She was asked how many signatures she'd been able to gather for the petition against the occupation and replied that 6,000 supporters had signed so far. And how many signatures would you like to collect, she was asked. Duisenberg hesitated for a moment and then said, "Six million". Critics stated that the figure was clearly an allusion to the number of Jewish victims of World War II. Duisenberg denied any link to the Holocaust, and stated that she just mentioned a multiple of the 6,000 they had already collected.

In a discussion program aired on Dutch TV in November 2005, she stated she understood suicide bombings in the light of the desperate conditions Palestinians are kept in. In the same program, she stated "I hope Israel realizes it can't take over the South of Amsterdam the same way it took over the West Bank!" referring to the vandalism, complaints, and threats of legal action she received for hanging the Palestinian flag on her property. This statement caused controversy and further intensification of allegations of antisemitism by critics in the Netherlands. In July 2006, the Dutch Public Prosecution (Openbaar Ministerie, OM), after an investigation following a complaint by Dutch lawyer Abraham Moszkowicz, concluded there was no reason to prosecute, as the TV format of the specific programme was meant to incite fierce, possibly controversial and exaggerated reactions.

In 2010 the OM saw again no reason to prosecute Duisenberg after allegations of sedition together with members of parliament Harry van Bommel and Sadet Karabulut. This complaint was also filed by Moszkowicz. That same year, Forbes published an article about Duisenberg in which she considers being labeled as anti-semitic to be "practically an honor".

In early 2014, the Dutch pro-Israel group Center for Information and Documentation Israel (CIDI), together with the Dutch anti-discrimination watchdog Complaint Bureau for Discrimination on the Internet (MDI), filed criminal charges against her in the Netherlands for an article which appeared on her pro-Palestinian website, which claimed to expose "the Jewish penetration of the Internet" claiming there was a Jewish conspiracy to control the Internet. The article, which is still available on her website, states that "The Jews — contrary to the ‘liberal’ views they officially say they profess — in their suppressive acts practically demonstrate that they always seek to dominate the information flow, they don't tolerate any dissent". Duisenberg subsequently denied the article was anti-Semitic and stated that she would not remove it from her website, although she added that "material placed on the website does not necessarily reflect our point of view".
