= Mask Off Maersk =

International campaign targeting Maersk's role in shipping military cargo to Israel

- Formation: 2024
- Founders: Palestinian Youth Movement
- Type: International activist campaign
- Methods: Direct action, protests, blockades, research, divestment advocacy
- Website: maskoffmaersk.com

Mask Off Maersk is an international campaign launched in 2024 by the Palestinian Youth Movement and allied organizations to pressure the Danish shipping giant Maersk to end its role in transporting military cargo and goods to Israel, including to Israeli settlements in the Israeli-occupied territories. The campaign frames Maersk as a critical "invisible profiteer" in the global arms supply chain, directly facilitating Israeli military actions in Gaza and the West Bank.

== Background ==
The campaign alleges that Maersk, one of the world's largest shipping and logistics companies, has shipped millions of pounds of military cargo from the U.S. to Israel, including components for armored vehicles, artillery, and F-35 fighter jets used in Israeli military operations. Mask Off Maersk also highlights Maersk's contracts with the U.S. Department of Defense and its logistical support for arms manufacturers, arguing that Maersk is complicit in what campaigners describe as genocide and war crimes against Palestinians. The campaign's primary demands are that Maersk must cut all ties with the Israeli military and Ministry of Defense, cease all transport of weapons, weapons components, and military cargo to Israel, and end all business with Israeli settlements in the occupied West Bank.

== Actions ==
=== Spain ===
In November 2024, Spanish authorities denied entry to the Maersk Denver, a container ship suspected of carrying weapons to Israel. The incident occurred at the Port of Algeciras on 9 November, amid growing scrutiny over international arms shipments linked to the Israeli military. Maersk denied the allegations, asserting that the cargo in question contained no military weapons or ammunition. The company stated that the shipment was legal and consistent with previous cargo that had passed through Spanish ports without incident. Nonetheless, Spain reportedly refused to allow not only the Denver but also another Maersk ship scheduled to arrive later that month to dock, reflecting a broader shift in port policy. The Spanish government has also been vocal in urging other European nations to recognize the State of Palestine and has taken a lead in pushing for a de facto embargo on military supplies destined for Israel. Following the incident, Maersk rerouted the Denver first to Tangier and then to Oman, while requesting clarification from Spanish authorities on the abrupt policy change. This action marked a significant development in the global Mask Off Maersk campaign, which seeks to block military shipments to Israel by targeting logistics firms complicit in the arms trade.

=== Denmark ===
On 24 February 2025, nearly 1,000 pro-Palestinian activists shut down Maerk's headquarters in Copenhagen as part of the international "Mask Off Maersk" campaign. Organized by the CRAC Collective, the protest aimed to halt Maersk's alleged role in transporting arms to Israel, which activists claim contributes to the ongoing violence in Gaza. Swedish climate activist Greta Thunberg joined the demonstration, criticizing corporate profiteering from conflict. Protesters blocked access to the headquarters for over four hours, demanding that Maersk end all military shipping to Israel and sever contracts with the Israeli Ministry of Defense.

=== Morocco ===
In April 2025, over 1,000 demonstrators in Tangier and Casablanca disrupted the docking of Maersk cargo ships allegedly transporting weapons to Israel. The Nexoe Maersk was delayed for 39 hours in Casablanca, and similar resistance was organized against the Maersk Detroit in Tangier, with protesters chanting slogans like "No genocidal weapons in Moroccan waters". Moroccan dockworkers had earlier called for a boycott of Maersk vessels suspected of supplying F-35 components used in Israel's bombardment of Gaza. The activists vowed continued disruption at every port along Maersk's supply routes, declaring that if governments and corporations refuse to act, "we will enact a people's arms embargo".

=== Australia ===
On 12 June 2025, pro-Palestinian protesters in Melbourne demonstrated outside Maersk offices as part of the global "Mask Off Maersk" campaign. Organized by Unionists for Palestine and the Free Palestine Coalition, the protest called on Maersk to cease transporting weapons components to Israel. Activists accused the company of playing a key role in the global arms supply chain, particularly in shipping parts for F-35 fighter jets used by the Israeli military in its operations in Gaza. In response to the demonstration, Maersk closed its office early and sent workers home.

=== United States ===
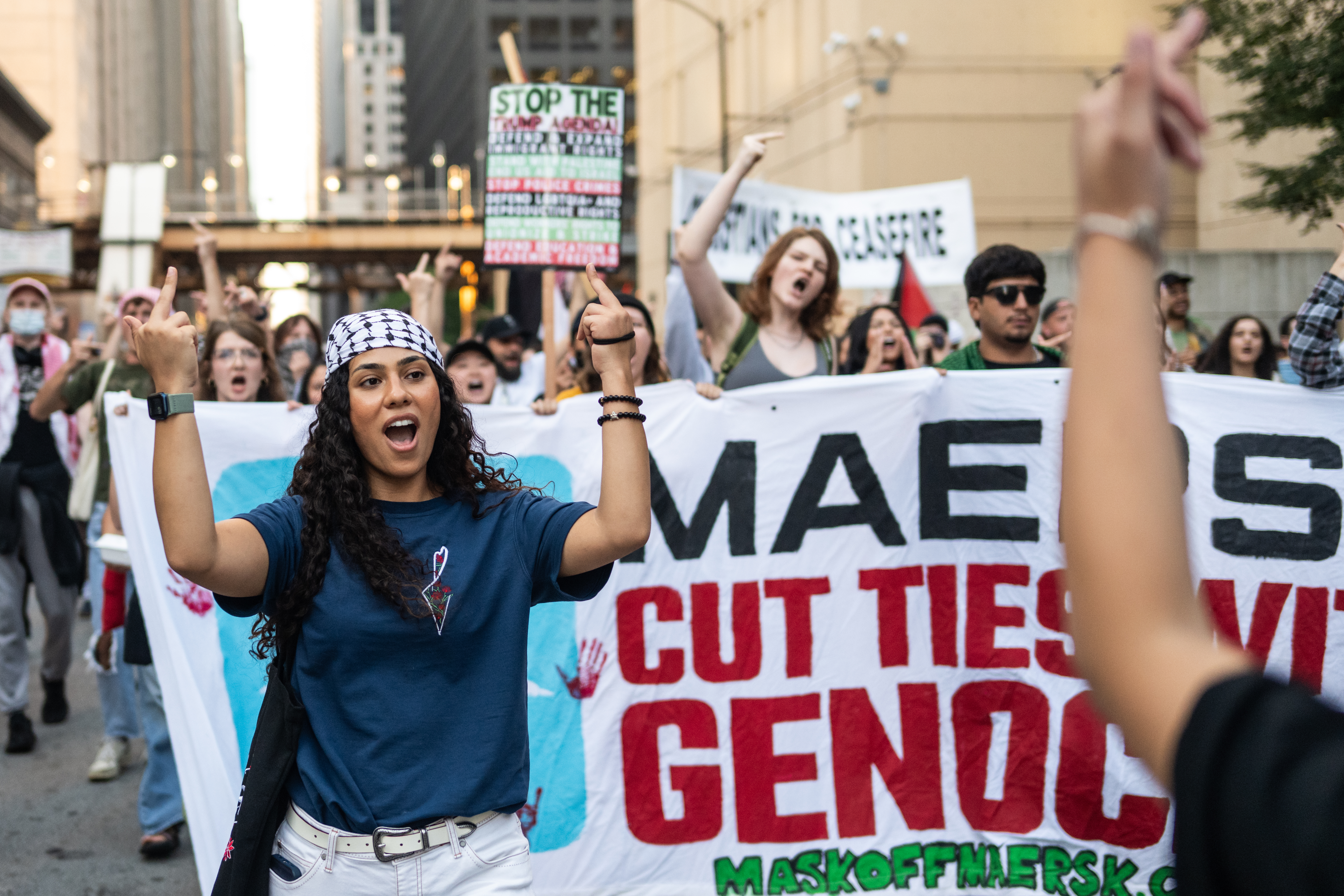
Pro-Palestinian protest in Chicago in September 2025

In mid 2025, demonstrations at the Port of Elizabeth, New Jersey, targeted Maersk's role in weapons shipments to Israel.

=== Canada ===
On 11 July 2025, activists from the Workers' Alliance blocked truck access to a Maersk warehouse in Montreal-North as part of a coordinated protest called "Amazon Crime Day". The action coincided with Amazon's Prime Day sales and lasted roughly an hour, halting all incoming and outgoing truck traffic. Protesters dispersed peacefully after being ordered to leave by Montreal police. The protest targeted Maersk's role in Amazon's supply chain, especially in the wake of mass layoffs in Quebec, including the closure of Amazon's unionized Laval warehouse earlier this year. Activists accused the CAQ government of failing to defend workers and ignoring Amazon's legal attacks on union rights. Protesters also condemned Maersk's involvement in the arms trade, alleging the company profits from shipping U.S. military equipment to Israel. Groups like Divest for Palestine cited Maersk's logistical role in transporting parts for F-35 fighter jets used in attacks on Gaza and elsewhere in the region.

== Reactions ==
In June 2025, following sustained pressure from Mask Off Maersk, Maersk announced it would halt the transport of goods to and from Israeli settlements in the West Bank, becoming the first global shipping company to take this step. Maersk stated it had strengthened its screening procedures, aligning with the United Nations OHCHR database of businesses involved in settlement activities, and confirmed it would no longer service Israeli settlements. However, campaigners emphasized that Maersk continues to ship military cargo to Israel and vowed to maintain pressure until all such shipments end.

== See also ==
- Geef Tegengas
- Boycott, Divestment and Sanctions
- Arms embargo
- List of companies involved in the Gaza war
- No Tech for Apartheid
