= Geef Tegengas =

Dutch climate and justice direct action collective

- Formation: 2020's
- Type: Direct action collective
- Location: Rotterdam, Netherlands
- Methods: Protest, direct action, blockades, demonstrations, civil disobedience
- Website: https://geeftegengas.org/

Geef Tegengas is a Dutch climate and justice direct action collective based in Rotterdam. The group organizes protests and direct actions on issues including climate change, fossil fuel infrastructure, migration justice, racism and solidarity with Palestine. The group describes itself as part of a broader struggle against "the logistics empire" and says its actions target the import of liquefied natural gas, hazardous cargo and other forms of trade that it regards as environmentally destructive or linked to human rights abuses.

The name Geef Tegengas is Dutch for "push back". The collective is associated with the broader Dutch movement for climate justice and anti-racist organizing, and has become known for public demonstrations targeting companies, institutions and policies it views as harmful to people and the environment.

== History ==
Geef Tegengas emerged in the early 2020s in Rotterdam, a city at the centre of the Dutch fossil fuel and shipping economy. The group presented its first public action as the 2024 action camp in Pernis, which it framed as a mass mobilization against liquefied natural gas expansion and the harms of the global fossil economy. Around 300 activists from across Europe took part in the camp, which featured political education, creative workshops and a final blockade of the Botlek Bridge.

The collective's public identity is closely tied to Rotterdam's port infrastructure. Geef Tegengas says it aims to disrupt "the heart of the logistics empire" and to push for a full trade and arms embargo on Israel, an immediate end to trade in goods linked to human rights violations, and the removal of polluting cargo from the port. The group has also linked its work to labor struggles in the port, arguing that workers are often exploited within the same systems it opposes.

The organisation describes its actions as non-symbolic disruption of infrastructure that it regards as central to climate destruction, war and exploitation. The group sees itself as targeting the top of large polluting companies rather than workers, and it presents its blockades as necessary pressure against institutions it believes will not change voluntarily. Activists associated with the collective have also cooperated with groups such as Scientist Rebellion, XR Healthcare Professionals, and Fossielvrij NL during related actions in Rotterdam.

== Activism and actions ==
On 9 April 2025, about 25 activists from Geef Tegengas occupied the tracks near Pernis, demanding a full weapons embargo on Israel. They blocked freight traffic for several hours until they were removed and arrested by the police.

On 24 and 25 April 2025, the group blocked the Rotterdam port railway line for the fourth time, saying it wanted the port to stop importing and exporting polluting substances such as coal.

On 11 October 2025, the activists blocked of train tracks at the Port of Rotterdam. The collective took part in actions aimed at Maersk and at port terminals connected to trade with Israel. Its stated demands include a full trade and arms embargo on Israel, an end to trade in goods and raw materials linked to human rights abuses, and a rapid phase-out of polluting cargo from the port. The action ended with police violence and around 200 protesters were arrested.

On 10 April 2026, around a hundred Geef Tegengas activists blocked the Betuweroute, a freight railway between Rotterdam and Germany. This line is frequently used to transport weapons and military equipment. The occupation ended with police intervention and about 50 protesters were arrested.

On 9 May 2026, around 25 activists blocked the train tracks at the Port of Rotterdam to demand a full weapons embargo on Israel. The direct action lasted for a couple of hours until it was ended by the police. On 10 and 11 May, activists blocked again the train tracks, each time being removed by the police after a few hours. This has disrupted freight train traffic coming from the port of Rotterdam each day. On 12 and 13 May, another group blocked the freight railway traffic near Pernis. On 14 May, activists from the group Kappen met Kolen also joined the blocking of the train tracks near the Vaanplein junction. On 15 May, the seventh day in a row of such direct actions, the group blocked again the tracks near the port of Rotterdam. On 16 May, activists blocked again the tracks coming from the port of Rotterdam. On 18 May the Betuweroute tracks were once again blocked.

On 22 May 2026, activists blocked the railway tracks of the Havenspoorlijn in Barendrecht.

On 12 June 2026, the group blocked the entrance to a construction site of a future data center in the Sloterdijk district of Amsterdam. Activists held banners with messages such as "Microsoft powers genocide".

On 19 June 2026, Geef Tegengas together with Kappen met Kolen blocked the railway tracks of the Betuweroute between Dodewaard and Ochten. The direct action ended with police intervention and all protesters were arrested.

On 3 October 2026, about 20 activists from Geef Tegengas and Kappen met Kolen blocked freight railway traffic in Herveld.

== Reactions ==
According to ProRail, each hour of blocking the Port Railway Line costs about 150,000€. Business association Deltalinqs estimated that the blockades caused millions in damages to the port. The direct actions on the tracks during May 2026 also caused reputational damage to the image of the port of Rotterdam.

On 21 May 2026, a motion by Bij1 party at the Rotterdam municipality to prohibit arms transit to Israel via the Port of Rotterdam was passed and adopted. Bij1 credited protests by activists, including the direct actions of Geef Tegengas, as contributing factors for this motion to be accepted.

== See also ==
- Mark Off Maersk
- Civil disobedience
- List of pro-Palestinian protests in the Netherlands
