= Harry van Bommel =

Dutch politician (born 1962)

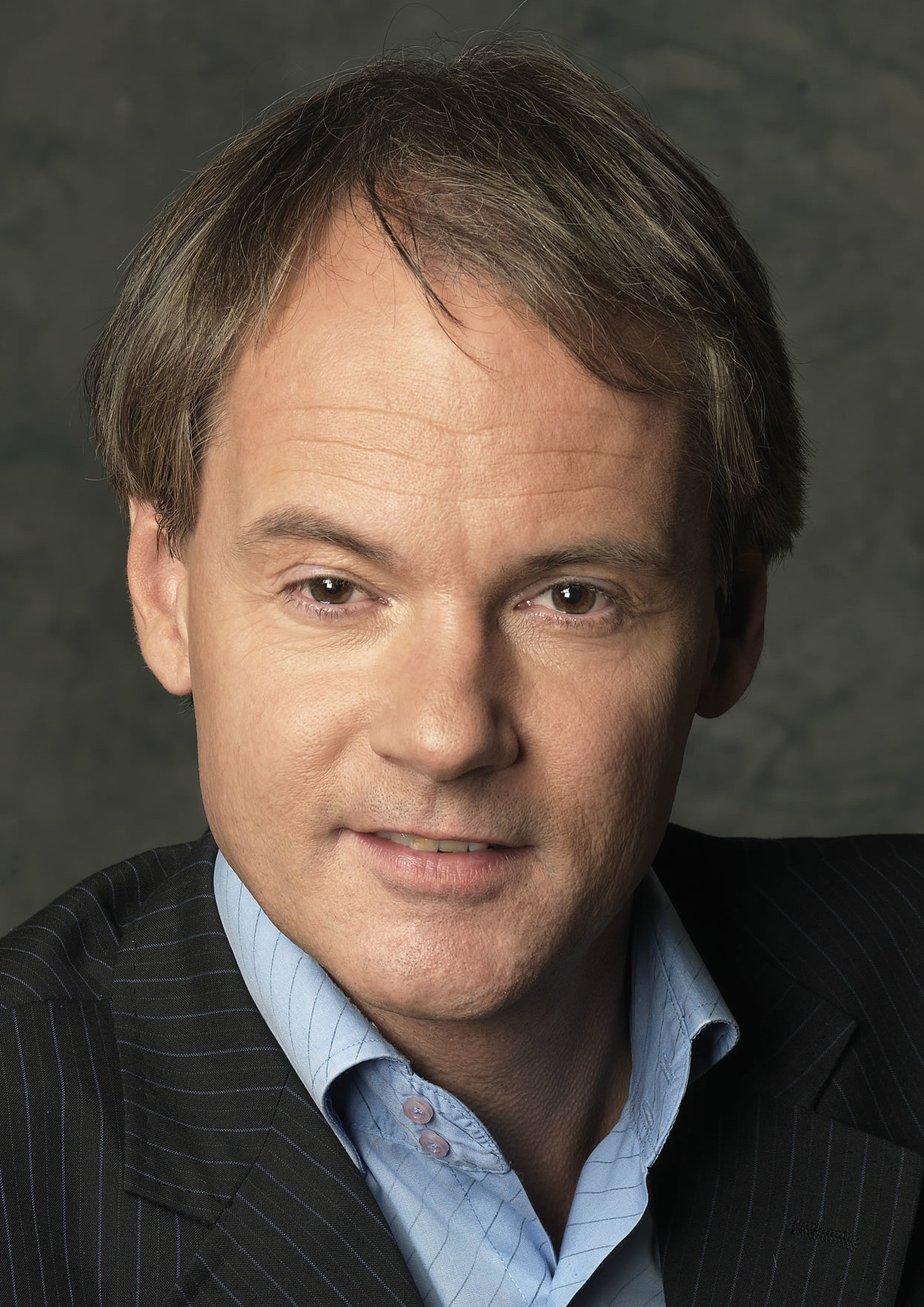

Member of the House of Representatives of the Netherlands
- In office 19 May 1998 – 23 March 2017

Personal details
- Born: Henricus van Bommel; 24 June 1962 (age 64) Helmond, Netherlands
- Party: Socialist Party (until 2017)
- Education: University of Amsterdam (MA – political science)
- Occupation: Politician, educator

Henricus "Harry" van Bommel (born 24 June 1962) is a Dutch politician, anti-globalisation activist and former educator. As a member of the Socialist Party (Socialistische Partij), he was an MP from May 1998 to March 2017. He focused on matters of foreign policy and the European Union.

== Biography ==
Born in Helmond, van Bommel grew up in Heino – a village in the province of Overijssel. Van Bommel was a teacher of Dutch and English before entering politics, having attended the University of Amsterdam to study political science.

He joined the Socialist Party in 1986, eventually joining its executive committee overseeing students, where he remained until 1994. In that year, he was elected to the Amsterdam City Council, having been elected to the Amsterdam East district council in 1990.

In May 1998, van Bommel became a member of the Dutch House of Representatives for the Socialist Party. Van Bommel's work as a Socialist Party member has, since 1994, included focus on educational policy and on international affairs. In the former capacity, he contributed to the "Alles Kids?" report on diminishing opportunities for youth.

In 2009, he attracted criticism for attending a demonstration against the Gaza War, where he chanted a slogan containing the word intifada; van Bommel clarified that he understood it to mean civil disobedience. At the same demonstration, the slogan "Hamas, Hamas, send the Jews to the gas" was chanted, which van Bommel stated he did not hear, or he would have left the demonstration.

In 2016, van Bommel campaigned actively against the 2014 treaty of association between the European Union and Ukraine, during a referendum campaign in the Netherlands. He gathered a team of ostensibly Ukrainian people in the Netherlands, appearing on television and in the press and condemning the treaty. According to an enquiry by the New York Times, his team was in fact composed of Russian nationals or of pro-rebels Eastern-Ukraine citizens.

Van Bommel's term in the House ended on 23 March 2017. He quit the Socialist Party later that year.

In November 2017 Van Bommel became an advisor to the municipal executives of Zwolle. He is alo active as an observer for the OCSE and in political consulting and training.
